= List of football clubs in Chile =

This is a list of football (soccer) clubs in Chile.

== Liga de Primera ==
There are 16 teams playing in the Primera División, as of the 2026 season.

| Club | City | Stadium |
|---|---|---|
| Audax Italiano | Santiago (La Florida) | Bicentenario de La Florida |
| Cobresal | El Salvador | El Cobre |
| Colo-Colo | Santiago (Macul) | Monumental David Arellano |
| Coquimbo Unido | Coquimbo | Francisco Sánchez Rumoroso |
| Deportes Concepción | Concepción | Municipal Alcaldesa Ester Roa Rebolledo |
| Deportes La Serena | La Serena | La Portada |
| Deportes Limache | Limache | Nicolás Chahuán Nazar Municipal |
| Everton | Viña del Mar | Sausalito |
| Huachipato | Talcahuano | CAP |
| Ñublense (Note: Ñuble Unido (1984–1986)) | Chillán | Municipal Nelson Oyarzún Arenas |
| O'Higgins | Rancagua | El Teniente |
| Palestino | Santiago (La Cisterna) | Municipal de La Cisterna |
| Unión La Calera (Note: Deportes La Calera (1954–1955)) | La Calera | Nicolás Chahuán Nazar Municipal |
| Universidad Católica | Santiago (Las Condes) | Claro Arena |
| Universidad de Chile (Note: Universidad (1935–1937)) | Santiago (Ñuñoa) | Nacional Julio Martínez Prádanos |
| Universidad de Concepción | Concepción | Municipal Alcaldesa Ester Roa Rebolledo |

== Liga de Ascenso ==
There are 16 teams playing in the Primera B, as of the 2026 season.

| Club | City | Stadium |
|---|---|---|
| Cobreloa | Calama | Zorros del Desierto |
| Curicó Unido | Curicó | La Granja |
| Deportes Antofagasta (Note: Antofagasta Portuario (1966–1974), Regional Antofagasta (1974–1978)) | Antofagasta | Regional Calvo y Bascuñán |
| Deportes Copiapó | Copiapó | Luis Valenzuela Hermosilla |
| Deportes Iquique (Note: Municipal Iquique (2003–2010)) | Iquique | Tierra de Campeones |
| Deportes Puerto Montt | Puerto Montt | Regional de Chinquihue |
| Deportes Recoleta | Santiago (Recoleta) | Municipal Leonel Sánchez Lineros |
| Deportes Santa Cruz (Note: Unión Comercio (1981–1982), Unión Santa Cruz (1983–1997)) | Santa Cruz | Municipal Joaquín Muñoz García |
| Deportes Temuco (Note: Green Cross-Temuco (1965–1984), Deportivo Temuco (2007)) | Temuco | Municipal Germán Becker |
| Magallanes | Santiago (San Bernardo) | Municipal Luis Navarro Avilés |
| Rangers | Talca | Fiscal de Talca |
| San Luis | Quillota | Municipal Lucio Fariña Fernández |
| San Marcos (Note: Deportes Arica (1979–2005)) | Arica | Carlos Dittborn |
| Santiago Wanderers | Valparaíso | Elías Figueroa Brander |
| Unión Española (Note: Unión Deportiva Española (1933–1934), Central (1939)) | Santiago (Independencia) | Santa Laura-Universidad SEK |
| Unión San Felipe | San Felipe | Municipal Javier Muñoz Delgado |

== Liga Segunda División ==
There are 14 teams playing in the Segunda División Profesional, as of the 2026 season.

| Club | City | Stadium |
|---|---|---|
| Atlético Colina (Note: AC Colina (2015–2018), Deportes Colina (2019–2024)) | Santiago (Colina) | Municipal Manuel Rojas del Río |
| Brujas de Salamanca | Salamanca | Municipal de Salamanca |
| Colchagua (Note: Deportes San Fernando (1957–1959)) | San Fernando | Municipal Jorge Silva Valenzuela |
| Concón National | Concón | Atlético Municipal de Concón |
| Deportes Linares (Note: Lister Rossel (1957–1973), Provincial Linares (1962), Frutilinares (1993), Linares Unido (2006–2010)) | Linares | Fiscal Tucapel Bustamante Lastra |
| Deportes Rengo (Note: Rengo Unido (2002–2010)) | Rengo | Municipal Guillermo Guzmán Díaz |
| General Velásquez (Note: not to be confused with General Velásquez from Puchuncaví, who took part in the 2010 Copa Chile) | San Vicente de Tagua Tagua | Municipal Augusto Rodríguez |
| Lota Schwager | Coronel | Municipal Federico Schwager |
| Provincial Osorno (Note: Deportes Osorno (2017)) | Osorno | Rubén Marcos Peralta |
| Provincial Ovalle | Ovalle | Diaguita |
| Real San Joaquín | Santiago (San Joaquín) | Municipal Guillermo Guzmán Díaz |
| Santiago City | Santiago (Las Condes) | Municipal de Lo Barnechea |
| Santiago Morning | Santiago (La Pintana) | Municipal de La Pintana |
| Trasandino (Note: Transandino (1952–1975), Cobreandino (1986–1992)) | Los Andes | Regional de Los Andes |

== Tercera A de Chile ==
There are 14 teams playing in the Tercera División A, as of the 2026 season.

Clubs in bold were ever in a professional division

| Club | City |
|---|---|
| Aguará | Santiago (La Reina) |
| Atlético Oriente | Santiago (Lo Barnechea) |
| Chimbarongo FC | Chimbarongo |
| Comunal Cabrero | Cabrero |
| Constitución Unido | Constitución |
| Deportes Rancagua | Rancagua |
| Futuro FC | Santiago (Peñalolén) |
| Imperial Unido | Nueva Imperial |
| **Lautaro de Buin** | Buin |
| **Malleco Unido** | Angol |
| Municipal Puente Alto | Santiago (Puente Alto) |
| **Naval** (Note: not to be confused with Naval de Talcahuano, defuncted in 1991) (Note: Los Náuticos (1991), Deportes Talcahuano (1992-2003)) | Talcahuano |
| **Quintero Unido** | Quintero |
| **Rodelindo Román** | Santiago (San Joaquín) |

== Tercera B de Chile ==
There are 28 teams playing in the Tercera División B, as of the 2026 season.

Clubs in bold were ever in a professional division

| Club | City |
|---|---|
| Audax Italiano de Paipote | Copiapó |
| Buenos Aires | Parral |
| CEFF Copiapó | Copiapó |
| Cultural Maipú | Santiago (Maipú) |
| Curacaví FC | Curacaví |
| Deportes Hualpén | Hualpén |
| **Deportes Laja Histórico** (Note: Deportes Laja (1981–2004)) | Laja |
| **Deportes Ovalle** (Note: Ovalle Ferroviarios (1963–1964)) | Ovalle |
| **Deportes Valdivia** | Valdivia |
| **Deportes Vallenar** (Note: Estrella del Huasco (2013)) | Vallenar |
| Deportivo Pumanque | Pumanque |
| EFC Conchalí | Santiago (Conchalí) |
| **Fernández Vial** | Concepción |
| Gasparín | Santiago (El Bosque) |
| **Iberia** (Note: Iberia de Los Ángeles (1969–1974), Iberia-Bío Bío (1974–1994)) | Los Ángeles |
| Inter Concepción | Concepción |
| Jardín del Edén | Santiago (La Florida) |
| Julio Covarrubias | Padre Hurtado |
| **Municipal Mejillones** | Mejillones |
| Municipal Ovalle (Note: a.k.a. CSD Ovalle) | Ovalle |
| Municipal Paillaco | Paillaco |
| Nacimiento | Nacimiento |
| Provincial Talagante | Talagante |
| República Independiente de Hualqui | Hualqui |
| **Tricolor Municipal** (Note: Tricolor Nacional (1943–1981)) | Paine |
| Unión Compañías | La Serena |
| Unión Glorias Navales | Viña del Mar |
| Vicente Pérez Rosales | Puerto Montt |

== Other clubs ==
=== At professional divisions (1933–2025) ===
==== Santiago and National ====
This is a list of clubs that have been in any professional division at Metropolitan or National level:

- Primera División (1933–Present)
- Serie B Profesional (1935–1941)
- División de Ascenso (1943–1945) (Note: considered as professional in this stint)
- División de Ascenso/Segunda División/Primera B (1952–1974/1975–1995/1996–Present)
- Segunda División Profesional (2012–Present)

| Club | City | Last season (Note: in the Chilean football league system) |
|---|---|---|
| Alianza (Note: Deportivo Alemán merged with CD Irarrázaval and they became Club Deportivo Alianza) | Santiago (Ñuñoa) | 1935 |
| Alianza de Curicó | Curicó | 1960 |
| América de Rancagua | Rancagua | 1954 |
| Aviación | Santiago | 1981 |
| Bádminton (Note: Santiago Bádminton (1933)) | Santiago | 1949 |
| Bádminton Curicó | Curicó | 1971 |
| Barnechea (Note: Deportivo Lo Barnechea (1983–1993)) | Santiago (Lo Barnechea) | 2024 |
| Bernardo O'Higgins | Santiago | 1945 |
| Carlos Walker | Santiago | 1936 |
| Comercio Atlético | Santiago | 1945 |
| Deportes Gasco (Note: Walter Müller (1943–1965)) | Santiago (Estación Central) | 1993 |
| **Deportes Melipilla** | Melipilla | 2025 |
| Deportes Pintana (Note: Municipal La Pintana (2009–2013), Deportes La Pintana (2013–2014)) | Santiago (La Pintana) | 2017 |
| Deportes Santiago | Santiago (Recoleta) | 1935 |
| Deportes Victoria | Victoria | 1990 |
| Deportivo Alemán | Santiago | 1934 |
| Deportivo Flecha | Santiago | 1945 |
| Estrella de Bulnes | Santiago | 1935 |
| Estrella Lo Franco | Santiago | 1945 |
| Ferrobádminton | Santiago | 1968 |
| Ferroviarios (Note: Talagante Ferro (1980–1983)) | Santiago (Estación Central) | 2025 |
| Florida Loma Blanca | Santiago | 1940 |
| Fortín Mapocho | Santiago | 1945 |
| Gimnástico Arturo Prat | Santiago | 1945 |
| Green Cross | Santiago | 1964 |
| Iberia (Note: The current club Iberia is based in Los Ángeles) (Note: Iberia-Puente Alto (1964–1968)) | Santiago | 1968 |
| Independiente de Cauquenes | Cauquenes | 2024 |
| Instituto O'Higgins | Rancagua | 1953 |
| Iván Mayo | Villa Alemana | 1996 |
| Juventus | Santiago | 1943 |
| La Cruz | Valparaíso | 1954 |
| Lautaro Juniors | Santiago | 1945 |
| Los Guindos | Santiago | 1940 |
| Lozapenco | Penco | 1993 |
| Luis Cruz Martínez | Curicó | 1966 |
| Maestranza Central | Santiago (San Bernardo) | 1955 |
| Maipo Quilicura | Buin | 2014-15 |
| Malloco Atlético | Peñaflor | 1945 |
| Metropolitano | Santiago | 1945 |
| Minas Melón | Nogales | 1952 |
| Morning Star | Santiago (Independencia) | 1935 |
| Municipal de Santiago | Santiago | 1970 |
| Naval de Talcahuano (Note: not to be confused with the current Naval, founded in 1972 as Los Náuticos) | Talcahuano | 1990 |
| O'Higgins Braden | Rancagua | 1954 |
| Regional Atacama | Copiapó | 1998 |
| **San Antonio Unido** | San Antonio | 2025 |
| San Bernardo Central | Santiago (San Bernardo) | 1966 |
| Santiago National (Note: Santiago National Juventus (1940–1941)) | Santiago | 1955 |
| Sirio | Santiago | 1945 |
| Soinca Bata | Melipilla | 1991 |
| Súper Lo Miranda | Lo Miranda | 1985 |
| Thomas Bata | Peñaflor | 1990 |
| Unión Temuco | Temuco | 2013 |
| Universidad Técnica (Note: a.k.a. UTE) | Santiago | 1969 |
| Valparaíso Ferroviarios | Valparaíso | 1963 |

===== B-teams =====
The following B-teams took part in the Serie B Profesional/División de Ascenso between 1935 and 1943:

- Audax Italiano B (1935–1942)
- Bádminton B (1935–1942)
- Colo-Colo B (1937–1943)
- Green Cross B (1940–1942)
- Magallanes B (1937–1942)
- Santiago Morning B (1937–1942)
- Unión Española B (1937–1942)
- Universidad Católica B (1940–1942)
- Universidad de Chile B (1938–1942)

The following B-teams took part in the Segunda División Profesional from 2012 to 2014:

- Audax Italiano B (2012–2014)
- Colo-Colo B (2012–2014)
- Ñublense B (2013–2014)
- Rangers B (2012)
- Unión Española B (2012–2014)
- Unión San Felipe B (2012)

==== Valparaíso Region (1940–1945) ====
This is a list of clubs that have been in any professional division at the Valparaíso Region: Asociación Porteña de Fútbol Profesional (1940–1945) and/or Asociación de Fútbol de Viña del Mar (1943–1945).

- Arcoíris (Viña del Mar)
- Atlético Italiano (Viña del Mar)
- Carmelo y Praga (Viña del Mar)
- Centro América (Viña del Mar)
- Deportes Viña del Mar (Viña del Mar)
- Deportivo Monterrey (Viña del Mar)
- Everton Royal (Viña del Mar) (Note: B-team of Everton)
- Forestal (Viña del Mar)
- Fosfatos Cemento Melón (La Calera)
- Ecuador Municipal (Concón) (Note: a.k.a. Municipal Concón)
- Gimnástico-Administración del Puerto (Valparaíso)
- Las Zorras (Valparaíso)
- República (Viña del Mar)
- Unión Española de Deportes (Valparaíso)
- Universitario Santa María (Valparaíso)
- Wanderers Royal (Valparaíso) (Note: B-team of Santiago Wanderers)

=== At semi-professional divisions (1981–2024) ===
This is a list of clubs that have just been in any semi-professional division: Tercera División/Tercera División A (1981–2011/2012–Present), Cuarta División/Tercera División B (1983–2003/2009–Present)

- Academia Fútbol Joven (Quilicura, Santiago)
- Academia Machalí (Machalí)
- Academia Quilpué (Quilpué)
- Academia Samuel Reyes (Curicó)
- Academia Santa Inés (La Serena)
- Adriana Cousiño (Calera de Tango)
- Alcázar de Penco (Penco)
- Alianza de Coltauco (Coltauco)
- Alianza Huertos Familiares (Tiltil, Santiago)
- Andarivel (El Monte)
- Antártida Chilena (Nancagua)
- Araucano Unido (Padre Las Casas)
- Arrieta Guindos (La Reina, Santiago)
- Arsenal de Recoleta (Recoleta, Santiago)
- Arturo Prat Hualañé (Hualañé)
- Atlético Curacaví (Curacaví)
- Atlético Molina (Molina)
- Bellavista La Florida (La Florida, Santiago)
- Brisas del Maipo (Estación Central, Santiago)
- Cabildo AGC (Cabildo)
- Cajón del Maipo (San José de Maipo)
- Campos de Batalla (Maipú, Santiago)
- Canillitas Chile (Cerrillos, Santiago)
- Cardenal Caro (Pichilemu)
- Católico 21 de Mayo (San Francisco de Mostazal)
- Caupolicán de Cauquenes (Cauquenes)
- Caupolicán de Rengo (Rengo)
- Chilectra (La Reina, Santiago)
- Clan Juvenil (El Monte)
- Coinca (Rancagua)
- Coliseo (Algarrobo)
- Comercial Temuco (Temuco)
- Comercio de Buin (Buin)
- Comercio de Llay Llay (Llay-Llay)
- Compañía de Teléfonos (Pedro Aguirre Cerda, Santiago)
- Compañía Tecno Industrial (Maipú, Santiago)
- Cóndor San Antonio (San Antonio)
- Cooferro (Mejillones)
- Corporación Lota (Lota) (Note: Corporación Lota and Nuevo Lota Schwager merged after the 2019 season and turned into Lota Schwager)
- Corporación Municipal Ñuñoa (Ñuñoa, Santiago)
- Corporación Peñalolén (Peñalolén, Santiago)
- Cristo Salva (Recoleta, Santiago) (Note: a club made up of Catholic players)
- Cultural Doñihue (Doñihue)
- Cultural Orocoipo (Machalí)
- Defensor Casablanca (Casablanca)
- Deportes Antofagasta-Santiago (Santiago)
- Deportes Cerrillos (Cerrillos, Santiago)
- Deportes Cerro Navia (Cerro Navia, Santiago)
- Deportes Coronel (Coronel)
- Deportes La Ligua (La Ligua)
- Deportes La Unión (La Unión)
- Deportes LAN Chile (Cerrillos, Santiago)
- Deportes Lota (Lota) (Note: not to be confused with Lota Schwager)
- Deportes Maipo (Isla de Maipo)
- Deportes Maipú (Maipú, Santiago)
- Deportes Pehuenche (San Clemente)
- Deportes Peñalolén (Peñalolén, Santiago)
- Deportes Peumo (Peumo)
- Deportes Pirque (Pirque, Santiago)
- Deportes Polpaico (Lampa, Santiago)
- Deportes Quilicura (Quilicura, Santiago)
- Deportes Quillón (Note: a.k.a. Colegio Quillón) (Quillón)
- Deportes Rahue (Osorno)
- Deportes San Pedro de la Paz (San Pedro de la Paz)
- Deportes Teno (Teno)
- Deportes Tocopilla (Tocopilla) (Note: competed in the Tercera A (2006–2008))
- Deportes Tocopilla (Peñalolén, Santiago) (Note: competed in the Tercera B (2013 Clausura))
- Deportes Tocopilla-Litueche (Litueche) (Note: competed in the Tercera B (2013 Apertura))
- Deportes Tomé (Tomé)
- Deportivo Arauco (Arauco)
- Deportivo Arellano (San Miguel, Santiago)
- Deportivo Colina (Colina, Santiago)
- Deportivo El Olam (Quilicura, Santiago)
- Deportivo Estación Central (Estación Central, Santiago)
- Deportivo Flecha (La Ligua)
- Deportivo Hirmas (Renca, Santiago)
- Deportivo La Granja (La Granja, Santiago)
- Deportivo Luis Musrri (Mallarauco)
- Deportivo Meza (Padre Las Casas)
- Deportivo Pilmahue (Villarrica)
- Deportivo Parral (Parral)
- Deportivo Purranque (Purranque)
- Deportivo Riquelme (La Cruz)
- Deportivo Santa Juana (Santa Juana)
- Deportivo Valdivia (Valdivia) (Note: not to be confused with Deportes Valdivia)
- Desportes Brasil (Putaendo)
- El Sol (Quilpué)
- Enfoque Rancagua (Rancagua)
- Escuela de Fútbol Macul (Macul, Santiago)
- Esperanza Joven (San Bernardo, Santiago)
- Estrella de Chacabuco (Casablanca)
- Estrella de Chile (Pudahuel, Santiago)
- Estudiantes de Quilpué (Quilpué)
- FC Monte Patria (Monte Patria) (Note: a.k.a. Municipal Monte Patria)
- Ferro Lampa (Colina, Santiago)
- Ferroviario Comercial (Las Cabras)
- Fundición Chagres (Catemu)
- Gendarmería de Chile (San Bernardo, Santiago)
- Goodyear (Maipú, Santiago) (Note: Grand Prix (1981–1984))
- Gol y Gol (Note: not to be confused with Gol y Gol from Vivanco, Río Bueno, who took part in the 2023 Copa Chile) (Pedro Aguirre Cerda, Santiago)
- Graneros Unido (Graneros) (Note: Chiprodal (1983–2002))
- Granja Juniors (Puente Alto, Santiago)
- Green Cross de Temuco (Temuco) (Note: not to be confused with Green Cross, defuncted in 1965, neither with Green Cross-Temuco, currently Deportes Temuco) (Note: Unión Deportiva Española de Temuco (1999))
- Guillermo Guzmán (Rengo)
- Hosanna (La Pintana, Santiago) (Note: a club made up of Evangelical Christians and Protestants)
- Huracán de Llolleo (Llolleo)
- Huracán de Puente Alto (Puente Alto, Santiago)
- Ignacio Serrano (Melipilla)
- Incas del Sur (Independencia, Santiago) (Note: a club made up of Peruvian immigrants and descendants)
- Inducar (Llay-Llay)
- Instituto Nacional (Santiago)
- Internacional (Renca, Santiago)
- Jireh FC (Santiago) (Note: a club made up of Evangelical Christian players)
- Juvenil Palmilla (Palmilla)
- Juventud 2000 (Curicó)
- Juventud Chépica (Chépica)
- Juventud Ferro (Chimbarongo)
- Juventud O'Higgins (Curacaví)
- Juventud Padre Hurtado (Padre Hurtado)
- Juventud Puente Alto (Puente Alto, Santiago) (Note: Deportes Puente Alto (1983–1984))
- Juventud Renca (Renca, Santiago)
- Juventud Salvador (Lo Espejo, Santiago)
- Juventud Textil Tomé (Tomé)
- La Pintana Unida (La Pintana, Santiago)
- Las Ánimas (Valdivia)
- Lautaro de Molina (Molina)
- Liceo de Curicó (Curicó)
- Liga Rancagua Oriente (Rancagua)
- Litoral Cartagena (Cartagena)
- Llano Unido (Melipilla)
- Los Cachorros (Sagrada Familia)
- Los Cóndores (Colbún)
- Luis Matte Larraín (Puente Alto, Santiago)
- Magallanes Nancagua (Nancagua)
- Magisterio Pudahuel (Pudahuel, Santiago)
- Maipú Unidos (Maipú, Santiago)
- Manuela Figueroa (Quillota)
- Metalúrgica Faro (San Bernardo, Santiago)
- Mulchén Unido (Mulchén)
- Municipal Alto Hospicio (Alto Hospicio)
- Municipal Hijuelas (Hijuelas)
- Municipal Isla de Maipo (Isla de Maipo)
- Municipal Lampa (Lampa, Santiago)
- Municipal Las Condes (Las Condes, Santiago)
- Municipal Limache (Limache)
- Municipal María Pinto (María Pinto)
- Municipal Nogales Melón (Nogales)
- Municipal Pozo Almonte (Pozo Almonte)
- Municipal Quilicura (Quilicura, Santiago)
- Municipal San Pedro de la Paz (San Pedro de la Paz)
- Municipal Santiago (Santiago) (Note: not to be confused with Municipal de Santiago, founded in 1961 and current member of Zambrano Association from Lo Prado)
- Municipal Talagante (Talagante)
- Nueva San Ramón (San Ramón, Santiago)
- Nuevo Lota Schwager (Lota) (Note: Nuevo Lota Schwager and Corporación Lota merged after the 2019 season and turned into Lota Schwager)
- O'Higgins de Codegua (Codegua)
- Orilla de Martínez (Curicó)
- Panamericano (San Ramón, Santiago)
- PGM San Pedro (Melipilla)
- Pizarreño (Maipú, Santiago)
- Provincial Curicó (Curicó) (Note: not to be confused with the current Curicó Unido, since Provincial Curicó defuncted in 2001)
- Provincial Los Andes (Los Andes) (Note: Casa Anny (1989–1990))
- Provincial Marga-Marga (Quilpué)
- Provincial Temuco (Temuco)
- Proyecto XXI (Cerrillos, Santiago)
- Provincial Ranco (La Unión)
- Pudahuel Barrancas (Pudahuel, Santiago)
- Pumas FC (Melipilla)
- Quilicura Unido (Quilicura, Santiago)
- Rancagua Sur (Rancagua)
- Rayo del Pacífico (Algarrobo)
- Real León (Pedro Aguirre Cerda, Santiago)
- Real Maipú (Maipú, Santiago)
- Real Valdivia (Valdivia)
- Regional Valdivia (Valdivia)
- Revisora Ormazábal (Antofagasta)
- San Antonio Atlético (San Antonio)
- San Bernardo Deportes (San Bernardo, Santiago)
- San Bernardo Unido (San Bernardo, Santiago)
- San Clemente (San Clemente)
- San Luis de Pirque (Pirque, Santiago)
- Santa Cruz Peñalolén (Peñalolén, Santiago)
- Santa Elisa (Chimbarongo)
- Santa Fe (Recoleta, Santiago)
- Santa María de Los Ángeles (Los Ángeles)
- Selección de Palestina (Santiago) (Note: a club made up of Palestinian descendants)
- Simón Bolívar (Quinta Normal, Santiago)
- Sportivo Cartagena (Cartagena)
- Sportverein Jugendland (Peñaflor)
- Talagante Unido (Talagante)
- Talca National (Talca)
- Tomás Greig (Rancagua)
- Triángulo Villa Francia (Estación Central, Santiago)
- UNIACC (Santiago)
- Unión Bellavista (Antofagasta) (Note: not to be confused with Unión Bellavista from Coquimbo, who took part in the Copa Chile in 2022 and 2023)
- Unión Casablanca (Casablanca)
- Unión Caylloma (Quinta de Tilcoco)
- Unión Cepol (Tiltil, Santiago)
- Unión Comercial de Hualañé (Hualañé)
- Unión Deportiva Ferroviarios (Victoria)
- Unión Flor Star (Puchuncaví)
- Unión Llay-Llay (Llay-Llay)
- Unión Molina (Molina)
- Unión Municipal La Florida (La Florida, Santiago)
- Unión Quilpué (Quilpué)
- Unión San Vicente (Talcahuano)
- Unión Santa María (Los Ángeles)
- Unión Til Til (Tiltil, Santiago)
- Unión Veterana (Peumo)
- Universidad Arturo Prat (Iquique)
- Universidad de Tarapacá (Arica)
- Universidad Iberoamericana (Santiago)
- Universidad San Sebastián (Concepción)
- Universitario de Temuco (Temuco)
- Valle del Elqui (Vicuña) (Note: Vicuña Elqui (1995–1996))

==== B-Teams ====
The following B-teams took part in the Tercera División A from 1999 to 2007:

- Cobreloa B (2006)
- Colo-Colo B (1999–2007) (Note: Colo-Colo Juniors (1999–2000))
- Deportes Concepción B (2006–2007)
- Deportes La Serena B (2002)
- Huachipato B (1999–2007)
- O'Higgins B (2001)
- Santiago Wanderers B (1999–2001)
- Universidad Católica B (1999–2006)
- Universidad de Chile B (2004–2006)

The following B-teams took part in the Tercera División B from 2002 to 2003:

- Hosanna B (2003)
- San Luis B (2002)

=== At Copa Chile ===
This is a list of teams that have only made appearances in the Copa Chile.

==== Amateur clubs ====
- 11 de Septiembre (Arica) (2024)
- Alas Portuarias (Puerto Aysén) (2024)
- Asotel (Antofagasta) (2009)
- Balmaceda (San Antonio) (2009, 2011)
- Barcelona (Copiapó) (2024)
- Bories (Puerto Natales) (2023)
- Central Norte (Antofagasta) (2024)
- Colo-Colito (Concepción) (2022)
- Cóndor (Pichidegua) (2022)
- Constitución FC (Constitución) (2023)
- Dante (Nueva Imperial) (2011, 2022)
- David Arellano (Coquimbo) (2009)
- Deportes Paniahue (Santa Cruz) (2010, 2011)
- Deportivo Audax (Futrono) (2009)
- Deportivo Lintz (Puerto Montt) (2009)
- Eléctrico Refinería (Calama) (2023)
- Estrella del Mar (Lota) (2011)
- Favorita (Molina) (2009, 2011)
- Ferroviarios (Monte Águila) (2024)
- General Velásquez (Puchuncaví) (2010) (Note: not to be confused with General Velásquez from San Vicente de Tagua Tagua)
- Gol y Gol (Vivanco, Río Bueno) (2023) (Note: not to be confused with Gol y Gol from Pedro Aguirre Cerda, Santiago)
- José Miguel Carrera (Purranque) (2011)
- Juan Lyon (Pichidegua) (2009)
- Juvenil Seminario (Talca) (2024)
- Juventud Hospital (Chañaral) (2011)
- Juventud Unida (Dalcahue) (2023)
- Juventud Varsovia (Lo Espejo, Santiago) (2010)
- Juventus (Caldera) (2009)
- La Higuera (La Ligua) (2022, 2023)
- La Obra (Talca) (2009)
- Liga Universitaria (Coyhaique) (2023)
- Lord Cochrane (Concepción) (2009, 2010)
- Lord Cochrane (Puerto Aysén) (2010)
- Lucero (Chillán) (2024)
- Luchador de Coñaripe (Coñaripe) (2009, 2010)
- Manuel Rodríguez (Puente Alto, Santiago) (2009)
- Marcos Trincado (Rengo) (2024)
- Miramar Sindempart (Coquimbo) (2024)
- Norte Unido (Iquique) (2024)
- Ojanco (Tierra Amarilla) (2023)
- Óscar Bonilla (Linares) (2010)
- Población Los Nogales (Estación Central, Santiago) (2023)
- Prat (Punta Arenas) (2010)
- Presidente Ibáñez (Punta Arenas) (2024)
- Quesos Kümey (Río Negro) (2011)
- San Antonio Unido (Temuco) (2023, 2024) (Note: not to be confused with San Antonio Unido from San Antonio)
- San Juan de Lago Pollux (Coyhaique) (2008–09)
- Teniente Merino (Concepción) (2023)
- Trasandino de Socoroma (Arica) (2009, 2023)
- Unión (Iquique) (2023)
- Unión Bellavista (Coquimbo) (2022, 2023) (Note: not to be confused with Unión Bellavista from Antofagasta, who took part in the 2008 Tercera División)
- Unión Wanderers General Lagos (Valdivia) (2010, 2011, 2024)
- Yungay (Iquique) (2009)

==== City and regional teams ====
- Regional de Zona Central de Chile (1961)
- Selección de Antofagasta (1961)
- Selección de Arica (1959)
- Selección de Calama (1959)
- Selección de Cauquenes (1959)
- Selección de Copiapó (1959, 1961)
- Selección de Iquique (1958, 1961)
- Selección de Juan Fernández (2024)
- Selección de Osorno (1958, 1961)
- Selección de Ovalle (1960)
- Selección de Peñaflor (1958)
- Selección de Pitrufquén (1959)
- Selección de Puerto Aysén (2008–09)
- Selección de Punta Arenas (2008–09)
- Selección de Rapa Nui (2009)
- Selección de San Pedro de Atacama (2010, 2011)
- Selección de Schwager (1961)
- Selección de Temuco (1958, 1961)
- Selección de Tocopilla (1958)
- Selección de Valdivia (1958)
- Selección de Vallenar (2010)

=== In the Chile national team ===
This is a list of another clubs with at least one player who has represented the Chile national team.

- Artillero de Costa (Talcahuano)
- Audax Deportivo (Santiago)
- Badminton (Valparaíso)
- Boca Juniors (Antofagasta)
- Camilo Henríquez (Santiago)
- Centro de Torneros (Talcahuano)
- Chilex (Chuquicamata)
- CD Naval (Valparaíso) (Note: not to be confused with the current Naval or Naval de Talcahuano, defuncted in 1991)
- Cinco de Abril (Santiago)
- Concepción United (Concepción)
- Deportivo Viña del Mar (Viña del Mar)
- Diez de Julio (Concepción)
- Eleuterio Ramírez (Santiago)
- English FC (Santiago)
- Escuela Normal (Santiago)
- Fábrica de Vidrios (Santiago)
- Gold Cross (Santiago)
- Gold Cross (Talcahuano)
- Gold Cross (Valparaíso)
- Jorge V (Santiago)
- Liceo de Concepción (Concepción)
- Linares FC (Linares)
- Loma Blanca (Santiago) (Note: not to be confused with Florida Loma Blanca)
- Maestranza (Santiago) (Note: not to be confused with Maestranza Central)
- Magallanes (Quillota) (Note: not to be confused with Magallanes from Santiago)
- National Star (Santiago)
- Norteamérica (Iquique)
- Primero de Mayo (Santiago)
- Rancagua FC (Rancagua)
- Rangers (Osorno) (Note: not to be confused with Rangers from Talca)
- River Plate (Pedro de Valdivia)
- Talca FC (Talca)
- The Commercial (Talcahuano)
- Thunder (Coquimbo)
- Unión Atlético (Talcahuano)
- Unión Coquimbo (Coquimbo)
- Unión FC (Valparaíso)
- Unión Marítimo (Taltal)
- Valparaíso FC (Valparaíso)

== See also ==
- Liga Chilena de Fútbol: Primera División
- Liga Chilena de Fútbol: Primera B
- Liga Chilena de Fútbol: Segunda División
- Liga Chilena de Fútbol: Tercera División
- Liga Chilena de Fútbol: Tercera B
