= Francisco Hormazábal =

Chilean footballer and manager (1920-1990)

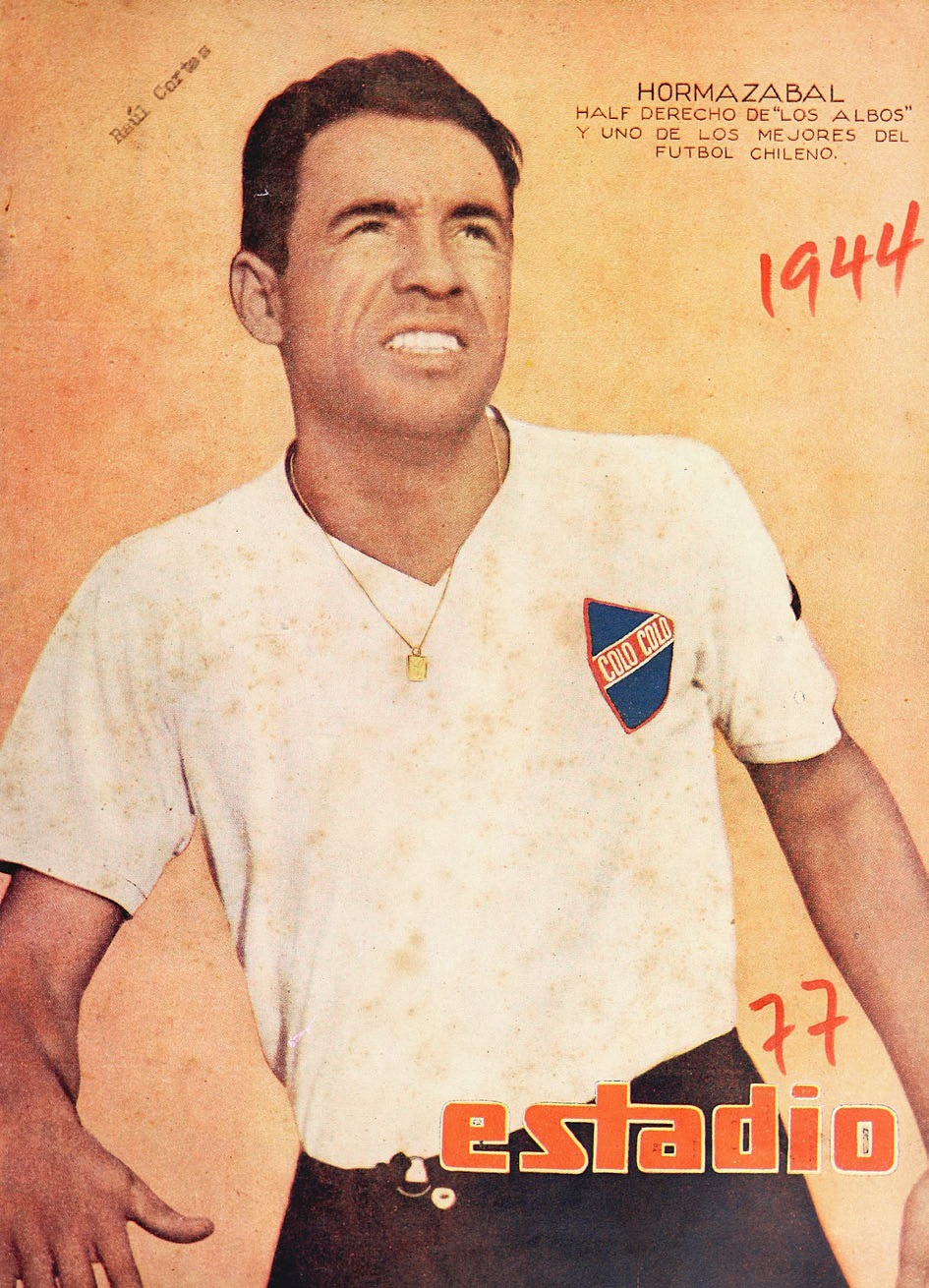

Personal information
- Full name: Francisco Hormazábal Castillo
- Date of birth: 4 July 1920
- Place of birth: Antofagasta, Chile
- Date of death: 13 January 1990 (aged 69)
- Place of death: Santiago, Chile
- Height: 1.74 m (5 ft 8 1/2 in)
- Position: Midfielder

Youth career
- Escuela 57 San Eugenio
- 1936–1940: Colo-Colo

Senior career*
Years	Team	Apps	(Gls)
1941–1949	Colo-Colo	78	(13)

International career
1945	Chile	4	(1)

Managerial career
- 1950: Fiap
- 1953: Palestino
- 1953–1954: O'Higgins Braden
- 1955–1956: O'Higgins
- 1957–1958: Colchagua
- 1959–1960: Unión Española
- 1962: Ferrobádminton
- 1963–1965: Chile
- 1963: Santiago Morning
- 1964: Green Cross
- 1966–1967: Independiente Medellín
- 1968–1969: Antofagasta Portuario
- 1970–1971: Colo-Colo
- 1972: Santiago Wanderers
- 1972–1973: Independiente Medellín
- 1974: Deportivo Pereira
- 1975–1976: Santa Fe
- 1977–1981: Unión Magdalena
- 1982: Deportivo Pereira
- 1983–1984: Huachipato
- 1985: Audax Italiano
- * Club domestic league appearances and goals

Francisco Hormazábal Castillo (born 4 July 1920 — 13 January 1990) was a Chilean footballer and manager.

== Career ==
As a youth player, Hormazábal was with club Escuela 57 from San Eugenio and the Colo-Colo youth system from 1936 to 1940. From 1941 to 1949 he played for the Colo-Colo senior team.

At international level, he represented Chile in the 1945 South American Championship with four appearances and one goal.

In 1975, he won the Primera División de Colombia title with Independiente Santa Fe as a manager, which failed to win that title in 37 years breaking the negative record in 2012.

== Honours ==
=== Player ===
==== Club ====
Colo-Colo

- Primera División de Chile (3): 1941, 1944, 1947

=== Manager ===
==== Club ====
Palestino

- Segunda División de Chile: 1953

O'Higgins

- Segunda División de Chile: 1954

Deportes Temuco

- Segunda División de Chile: 1963

Antofagasta Portuario

- Segunda División de Chile: 1968

Colo-Colo

- Primera División de Chile: 1970

Santa Fé

- Primera División de Colombia: 1975

Huachipato

- Segunda División de Chile: 1984
