= 1939 Campeonato Nacional Primera División =

Campeonato Nacional de Fútbol Profesional
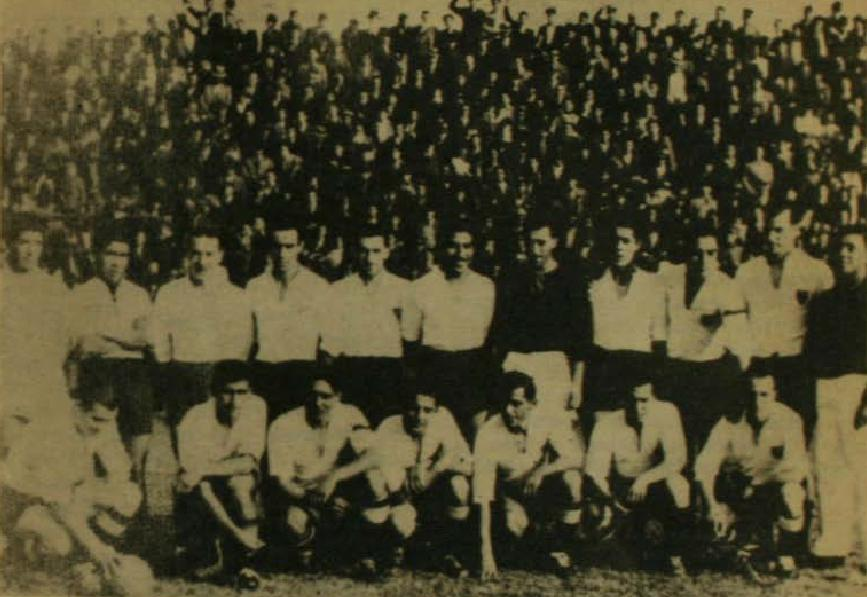
- Colo-Colo, champions
- Dates: 15 April 1939 – 7 December 1939
- Champions: Colo-Colo (2nd title)
- Matches: 109
- Goals: 583 (5.35 per match)
- Top goalscorer: Alfonso Domínguez (32 goals)
- Total attendance: 481,533
- Average attendance: 4,417

The 1939 Campeonato Nacional de Fútbol Profesional was Chilean first tier's 7th season. Colo-Colo was the tournament's champion, winning its second title.

== First stage ==
=== Scores ===
	AUD	BAD	COL	GCR	MAG	MET	SMO	SNA	UCA	UCH
Audax		3–3	1–7	6–1	1–2	5–2	2–3	3–0	3–3	4–3
Bádminton			5–1	6–2	3–8	6–0	3–1	2–0	1–4	3–2
Colo-Colo				4–1	9–1	5–3	3–3	5–1	3–2	1–2
Green Cross					1–3	3–1	5–7	5–1	3–4	0–2
Magallanes						5–2	8–3	3–3	3–4	2–1
Metropolitano							1–7	4–4	1–2	0–5
S. Morning								2–0	8–2	3–5
S. National									4–1	2–2
U. Católica										0–2
U. de Chile										

=== Standings ===
Pos	Team	Pld	W	D	L	GF	GA	GD	Pts	Qualification
1	Colo-Colo	9	6	1	2	38	19	+19	13	
2	Badminton	9	6	1	2	32	21	+11	13	
3	Magallanes	9	6	1	2	35	27	+8	13	
4	Universidad de Chile	9	5	1	3	24	15	+9	11	
5	Santiago Morning	9	5	1	3	37	29	+8	11	
6	Audax Italiano	9	4	2	3	28	24	+4	10	
7	Universidad Católica	9	4	1	4	22	28	−6	9	
8	Santiago National	9	1	3	5	15	27	−12	5	
9	Green Cross	9	2	0	7	21	34	−13	4	
10	Metropolitano	9	0	1	8	14	42	−28	1	Eliminated from Second Stage

== Second stage ==
=== Scores ===
	AUD	BAD	COL	GCR	MAG	SMO	SNA	UCA	UCH
Audax		4–3	2–4	8–2	1–1	2–4	3–1	1–1	3–2
Bádminton			3–4	4–0	0–1	1–4	1–1	1–2	1–2
Colo-Colo				6–2	5–1	2–2	4–1	1–1	1–0
Green Cross					4–4	2–1	5–2	4–5	3–1
Magallanes						5–6	4–2	1–0	1–1
S. Morning							4–0	2–1	2–3
S. National								0–5	3–1
U. Católica									3–1
U. de Chile									

=== Standings ===
Pos	Team	Pld	W	D	L	GF	GA	GD	Pts	Qualification
1	Colo-Colo	8	6	2	0	27	12	+15	14	
2	Santiago Morning	8	5	1	2	25	16	+9	11	
3	Audax Italiano	8	4	2	2	24	18	+6	10	
4	Universidad Católica	8	4	2	2	18	11	+7	10	
5	Magallanes	8	3	3	2	18	19	−1	9	
6	Green Cross	8	3	1	4	22	31	−9	7	
7	Universidad de Chile	8	2	1	5	11	17	−6	5	
8	Bádminton	8	1	1	6	14	18	−4	3	
9	Santiago National	8	1	1	6	10	27	−17	3	Eliminated from Third Stage

== Third stage ==
=== Scores ===
	AUD	BAD	COL	GCR	MAG	SMO	UCA	UCH
Audax		3–4	3–2	3–3	6–2	2–1	1–1	3–4
Bádminton			0–7	2–4	3–3	1–4	2–0	3–3
Colo-Colo				4–3	3–3	3–1	3–1	3–2
Green Cross					5–1	5–7	2–2	3–1
Magallanes						1–3	2–2	2–2
S. Morning							2–4	4–2
U. Católica								2–0
U. de Chile								

=== Standings ===
Pos	Team	Pld	W	D	L	GF	GA	GD	Pts
1	Colo-Colo	7	5	1	1	25	13	+12	11
2	Audax Italiano	7	3	2	2	21	17	+4	8
3	Santiago Morning	7	4	0	3	22	18	+4	8
4	Green Cross	7	3	2	2	25	20	+5	8
5	Universidad Católica	7	2	3	2	12	12	0	7
6	Bádminton	7	2	2	3	15	24	−9	6
7	Universidad de Chile	7	1	2	4	14	20	−6	4
8	Magallanes	7	0	4	3	14	24	−10	4

== Final standings ==
Pos	Team	Pld	W	D	L	GF	GA	GD	Pts	Qualification
1	Colo-Colo	24	17	4	3	90	44	+46	38	Champions
2	Santiago Morning	24	14	2	8	84	63	+21	30	
3	Audax Italiano	24	11	6	7	73	59	+14	28	
4	Universidad Católica	24	10	6	8	52	51	+1	26	
5	Magallanes	24	9	8	7	67	70	−3	26	
6	Bádminton	24	9	4	11	61	63	−2	22	
7	Universidad de Chile	24	8	4	12	49	52	−3	20	
8	Green Cross	24	8	3	13	68	85	−17	19	
9	Santiago National	17	2	4	11	25	54	−29	8	
10	Metropolitano	9	0	1	8	14	42	−28	1	

Campeonato Profesional
1939 champions
Colo-Colo
2nd title

== Topscorer ==
Name	Team	Goals
(Chile) Alfonso Domínguez	Colo-Colo	32
