= 1954 Campeonato Nacional Segunda División =

Segunda División
- Season: 1954
- Champions: O'Higgins Braden
- Promoted: O'Higgins Braden; América de Rancagua
- Relegated: Thomas Bata; La Cruz Football Club
- Top goalscorer: Jorge Peñaloza (O'Higgins Braden; 23 goals)

The 1954 Segunda División de Chile was the third season of the Segunda División de Chile.

O'Higgins Braden was the tournament's winner.

== Table ==
Pos	Team	Pld	W	D	L	GF	GA	GD	Pts	Promotion or relegation
1	O'Higgins Braden (Note: Founded in the championship's beginnings after the merger between Instituto O'Higgins and Braden. Both teams were from Rancagua.)	18	12	6	0	62	24	+38	30	Champion. Promoted.
2	América	18	10	5	3	43	25	+18	25	
3	Thomas Bata	18	10	4	4	56	30	+26	24	Voluntarily relegated (Note: Despite the third place achieved, the team prefer to return to its local football association for 1955.)
4	San Luis de Quillota	18	11	2	5	35	23	+12	24	
5	Trasandino	18	9	2	7	44	37	+7	20	
6	Alianza	18	7	6	5	35	34	+1	20	
7	Unión La Calera	18	4	4	10	33	43	−10	12	
8	Universidad Técnica del Estado	18	4	3	11	30	50	−20	11	
9	Santiago National	18	4	2	12	26	54	−28	10	
10	La Cruz	18	1	2	15	25	69	−44	4	Relegated

Source: rsssf.com

== See also ==
- Chilean football league system
