= Salvador Nocetti =

Argentine footballer and coach

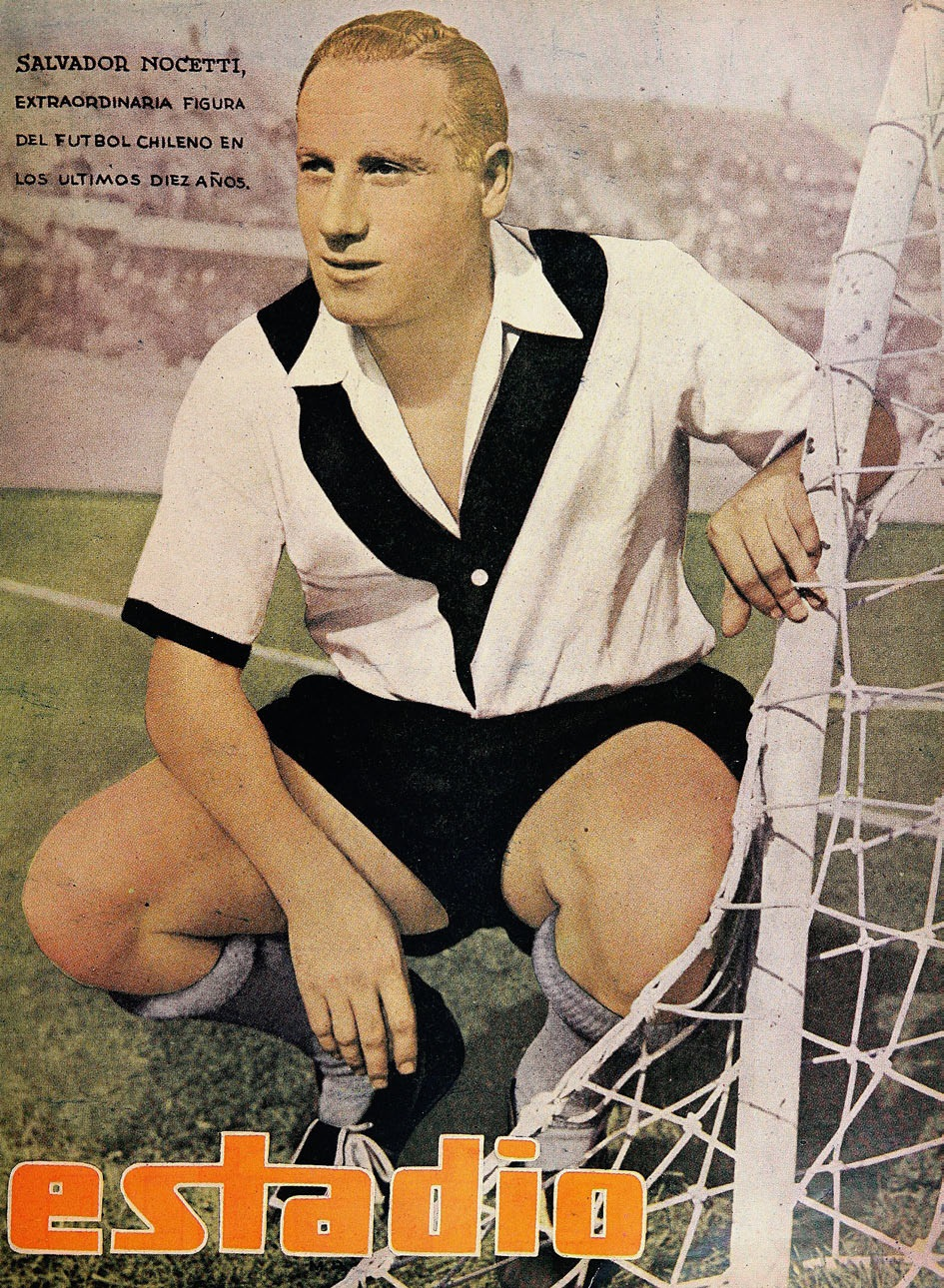
- Nocetti on cover of Estadio in 1945

Personal information
- Full name: Salvador Nocetti Ballardo
- Place of birth: Buenos Aires, Argentina

Senior career*
Years	Team	Apps	(Gls)
1933–1934	Sportivo Barracas		
1935	Deportes Santiago		
1936–1946	Santiago Morning		

International career
1940–1941	Chile		

Managerial career
- 1947–1948: Audax Italiano
- 1950: Universidad de Chile
- 1954: América de Rancagua
- 1967–1969: Santiago Morning
- 1968–1969: Chile
- 1979: Santiago Morning
- * Club domestic league appearances and goals

Salvador Nocetti Ballardo (18 July 1913 - 9 August 1986) was an Argentine naturalized Chilean football manager and player who played as a midfielder.

== Playing career ==
Nocetti came to Chile in 1935 from Sportivo Barracas and joined Deportes Santiago, the club before Santiago Morning. The next year, he continued with Santiago Morning when they were founded after Deportes Santiago and Morning Star merged.

A historical player of Santiago Morning, Nocetti was top-tier champion with them in 1942, first title in the club's history, serving as the team captain. He played for them until 1946.

At international level, he represented the Chile national team in 1940 and 1941, becoming the second Argentine to make it after Colin Campbell in 1910.

== Managerial career ==
Once retired from football, he managed Audax Italiano (1947–1948), when reached a league title, then in 1950, he managed Universidad de Chile (where obtained poor results and failed to complete his period), in 1954 to América de Rancagua (team which then merged with O'Higgins Braden to make way to O'Higgins F.C.), and in late 60s to the Chile national team (1968–1969) and Santiago Morning from 1967 to 1969 and 1979.

== Honours ==
=== Footballer ===
Santiago Morning

- Primera División de Chile: 1942

=== Manager ===
Audax Italiano

- Primera División de Chile: 1948

Chile

- Copa del Pacífico: 1968
