= 1934 Campeonato Nacional Primera División =

Campeonato Nacional de Fútbol Profesional
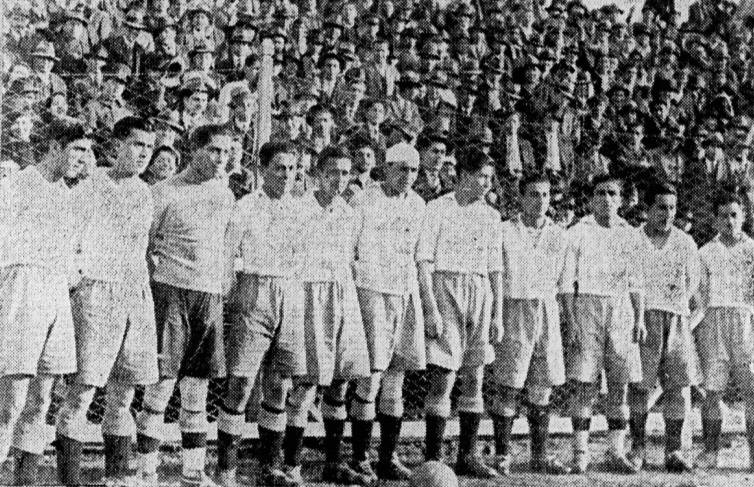
- Magallanes, champions
- Dates: 17 June 1934 – 9 December 1934
- Champions: Magallanes (2nd title)
- Relegated: Morning Star; Deportivo Alemán; Green Cross; Ferroviarios; Carlos Walker; Santiago National
- Matches: 66
- Goals: 402 (6.09 per match)
- Top goalscorer: Carlos Giudice (19 goals)
- Biggest home win: Unión Española 14–1 Morning Star (19 August); Magallanes 14–1 Santiago National (10 November)

The 1934 Campeonato Nacional de Fútbol Profesional was Chilean first tier’s 2nd season. Magallanes were the tournament’s champions, winning their second ever title.

== Scores ==
	AUD	BAD	CWA	COL	DAL	FER	GCR	MAG	MOS	SAN	SNA	UES
Audax		3–3	5–1	4–3	4–1	5–2	8–1	3–3	8–3	4–2	3–1	3–1
Bádminton			4–0	3–3	10–3	6–2	5–2	1–2	2–2	2–1	2–3	4–2
C. Walker				1–6	2–3	2–1	5–4	1–5	6–0	1–3	2–6	0–3
Colo-Colo					1–1	8–0	5–3	2–5	5–0	5–1	8–0	5–1
D. Alemán						1–4	0–1	0–8	4–2	1–5	1–2	0–3
Ferroviarios							1–2	0–4	7–1	1–3	1–1	2–3
Green Cross								0–5	2–2	0–8	3–4	1–10
Magallanes									11–0	4–3	14–1	2–0
Morning S.										3–4	3–5	1–14
Santiago											2–0	2–3
S. National												0–6
U.D. Española												

== Standings ==
Pos	Team	Pld	W	D	L	GF	GA	GR	Pts	Qualification or relegation
1	Magallanes	11	10	1	0	63	11	5.727	21	Champions
2	Audax Italiano	11	9	2	0	50	21	2.381	19 (Note: 1 bonus point awarded) (Note: 2 points deducted)	
3	Colo-Colo	11	7	2	2	51	19	2.684	17	
4	Unión Deportiva Española	11	7	0	4	46	20	2.300	16 (Note: 2 bonus points awarded)	
5	Badminton	11	6	3	2	42	23	1.826	13	
6	Santiago	11	6	0	5	34	24	1.417	12	
7	Santiago National	11	5	1	5	23	45	0.511	11	Relegated to Serie B
8	Carlos Walker	11	3	0	8	21	40	0.525	6	Relegated to Serie B
9	Ferroviarios	11	2	1	8	21	36	0.583	5	Relegated to Serie B
10	Green Cross	11	2	1	8	19	53	0.358	5	Relegated to Serie B
11	Deportivo Alemán	11	2	1	8	15	42	0.357	5	Relegated to Serie B
12	Morning Star	11	0	2	9	17	68	0.250	2	Relegated to Serie B

Source: rsssf.com
Notes:

Campeonato Profesional
1934 champions
Magallanes
2nd title

== Topscorer ==
Name	Team	Goals
(Chile) Carlos Giudice	Audax Italiano	19
