= 1953 Campeonato Nacional Segunda División =

Segunda División
- Season: 1953
- Champions: Thomas Bata

The 1953 Segunda División de Chile was the second season of the Segunda División de Chile.

Thomas Bata was the tournament's winner.

== Table ==
Pos	Team	Pld	W	D	L	GF	GA	GD	Pts
1	Thomas Bata (Note: Despite being champion, the company Bata, which financed most of the club's spending, decided to reject the promotion to Primera División due to the costs involved in promotion to the 1954 Primera División de Chile.) (C)	18	14	1	3	58	18	+40	29
2	América	18	9	4	5	29	19	+10	22
3	Instituto O'Higgins	18	9	4	5	27	24	+3	22
4	Maestranza Central	18	7	4	7	32	21	+11	18
5	Trasandino	18	7	3	8	24	35	−11	17
6	San Luis de Quillota	18	4	4	10	18	32	−14	12
7	Santiago National	18	2	2	14	19	58	−39	6

Source: rsssf.com
(C) Champions

== See also ==
- Chilean football league system
