= Serie B Profesional (Chile) =

- Founded: 1935
- Folded: 1942
- Country: Chile
- Confederation: CONMEBOL
- Level on pyramid: 2 (1935–1942)
- Promotion to: Primera División

The Serie B Profesional (usually called simply Serie B) was the second division of Chilean football (soccer) in 1935 until 1942. The tournament was played on a home-and-away round-robin basis. It was established by the Asociación de Fútbol de Santiago (AFS), affiliated with the Chilean Football Federation, and at that time it corresponded to the lower of the two professional divisions of Chilean football. The most successful team was Universidad de Chile, which won the tournament on two occasions.

Although it was established as a second tier to the First Division, promotion and relegation with the top flight were only sporadically implemented. Together with the División de Ascenso founded in 1943 and the División de Honor Amateur launched in 1949, Serie B laid the groundwork for what is now Primera B.

== Division levels ==
Year	Level	Promotion to
1935–1942	2	Primera División

== Champions ==
Ed.	Season	Champion	Runner-up
1	1935	Santiago National	Carlos Walker
2	1936	Universidad de Chile	Ferroviarios
3	1937	Universidad de Chile	Santiago National
4	1938	Metropolitano	Santiago National
–	1939	No tournament	
5	1940	Deportivo Flecha	Colo-Colo B
6	1941	Magallanes B	Maestranza Central
7	1942	Green Cross B	
Defunct Tournament (See: División de Honor Amateur)
