= 1944 Campeonato Nacional Primera División =

Campeonato Nacional de Fútbol Profesional
- Dates: 3 June 1944 – 3 December 1944
- Champions: Colo-Colo (4th title)
- Matches: 132
- Goals: 572 (4.33 per match)
- Top goalscorer: Alfonso Domínguez; Juan Alcántara (19 goals)
- Biggest home win: Colo-Colo 9–3 Santiago National (2 July)
- Total attendance: 785,093
- Average attendance: 5,947

The 1944 Campeonato Nacional de Fútbol Profesional was Chilean first tier’s 12th season. Colo-Colo was the tournament’s champion, winning its fourth title.

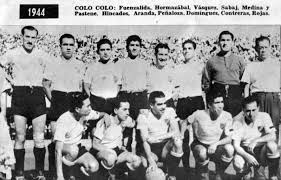
Colo-Colo's champion team in 1944

== Scores ==
	AUD	BAD	COL	EVE	GCR	MAG	SMO	SNA	UES	UCA	UCH	SWA
Audax		0–1	1–0	2–1	1–3	1–1	2–1	4–3	1–3	4–3	3–2	3–0
Bádminton	1–2		0–3	1–1	2–4	1–3	2–2	3–2	1–5	1–3	2–4	0–1
Colo-Colo	3–1	4–1		3–0	4–2	1–5	2–2	9–3	1–2	2–1	4–1	4–2
Everton	4–6	2–2	1–1		4–3	0–4	2–4	1–2	1–4	0–2	4–3	2–1
Green Cross	2–4	1–0	2–4	2–2		4–3	1–1	0–4	1–2	0–2	2–0	2–3
Magallanes	0–1	3–1	1–2	6–2	4–2		1–1	3–1	4–1	2–5	3–2	2–1
S. Morning	4–3	3–2	1–4	7–3	3–0	2–2		2–1	2–2	2–3	2–1	1–1
S. National	2–3	0–2	2–0	4–3	6–1	3–2	0–1		1–4	3–4	4–0	4–2
U. Española	1–4	1–2	1–2	1–0	1–3	1–4	3–4	1–5		1–2	5–0	2–2
U. Católica	2–2	0–2	1–1	2–2	6–1	2–3	4–3	4–4	1–0		2–4	2–1
U. de Chile	1–1	4–0	1–5	6–3	2–1	2–1	2–3	5–6	2–0	2–2		4–2
S. Wanderers	3–3	1–1	1–0	0–2	2–2	1–3	1–1	2–1	1–2	6–2	1–1	

== Standings ==
Pos	Team	Pld	W	D	L	GF	GA	GD	Pts	Qualification
1	Colo-Colo	22	14	3	5	59	32	+27	31	Champions
2	Audax Italiano	22	13	4	5	52	41	+11	30	
3	Magallanes	22	13	3	6	60	37	+23	29	
4	Santiago Morning	22	11	7	4	54	42	+12	29	
5	Universidad Católica	22	11	5	6	55	46	+9	27	
6	Santiago National	22	10	1	11	60	57	+3	21	
7	Unión Española	22	9	2	11	43	44	−1	20	
8	Universidad de Chile	22	8	3	11	49	56	−7	19	
9	Santiago Wanderers	22	5	6	11	35	46	−11	16	
10	Green Cross	22	6	3	13	39	60	−21	15	
11	Bádminton	22	5	4	13	28	49	−21	14	
12	Everton	22	4	5	13	41	65	−24	13	

Campeonato Profesional
1944 champions
Colo-Colo
4th title

== Topscorer ==
Name	Team	Goals
(Chile) Alfonso Domínguez	Colo-Colo	19
(Chile) Juan Alcántara	Audax Italiano	19
