= Obdulio Diano =

Argentine footballer (1919–2007)

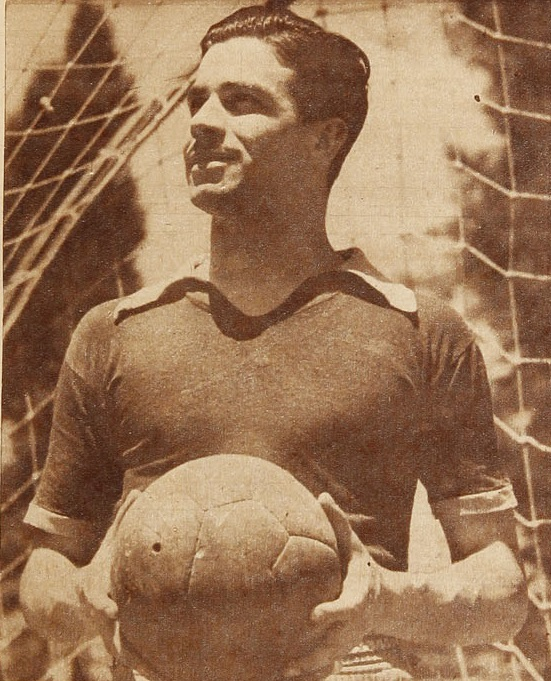

Personal information
- Date of birth: 27 October 1919
- Place of birth: Bernal, Argentina
- Date of death: 19 February 2007 (aged 87)
- Place of death: Mar del Plata, Argentina
- Height: 1.77 m (5 ft 10 in)
- Position: Goalkeeper

Senior career*
Years	Team	Apps	(Gls)
1939	Argentino de Quilmes	2	(0)
1940	Santiago National		
1941–1943	Colo-Colo	42	(0)
1944–1952	Boca Juniors	109	(0)

International career
1947	Argentina MNT	1	(0)
- * Club domestic league appearances and goals

Obdulio Diano (October 27, 1919 in Bernal, Argentina – February 19, 2007 in Mar del Plata, Argentina) is a former Argentine footballer who played for clubs of Argentine and Chile.

== Teams ==
- Argentino de Quilmes 1939
- Santiago National 1940
- Colo-Colo 1941–1943
- Boca Juniors 1944–1952

== Titles ==
Colo-Colo

- Chilean Primera División: 1941

Boca Juniors

- Argentine Primera División: 1944

Argentina

- Copa América: 1947
