= 1954 Campeonato Nacional Primera División =

Campeonato Nacional de Fútbol Profesional
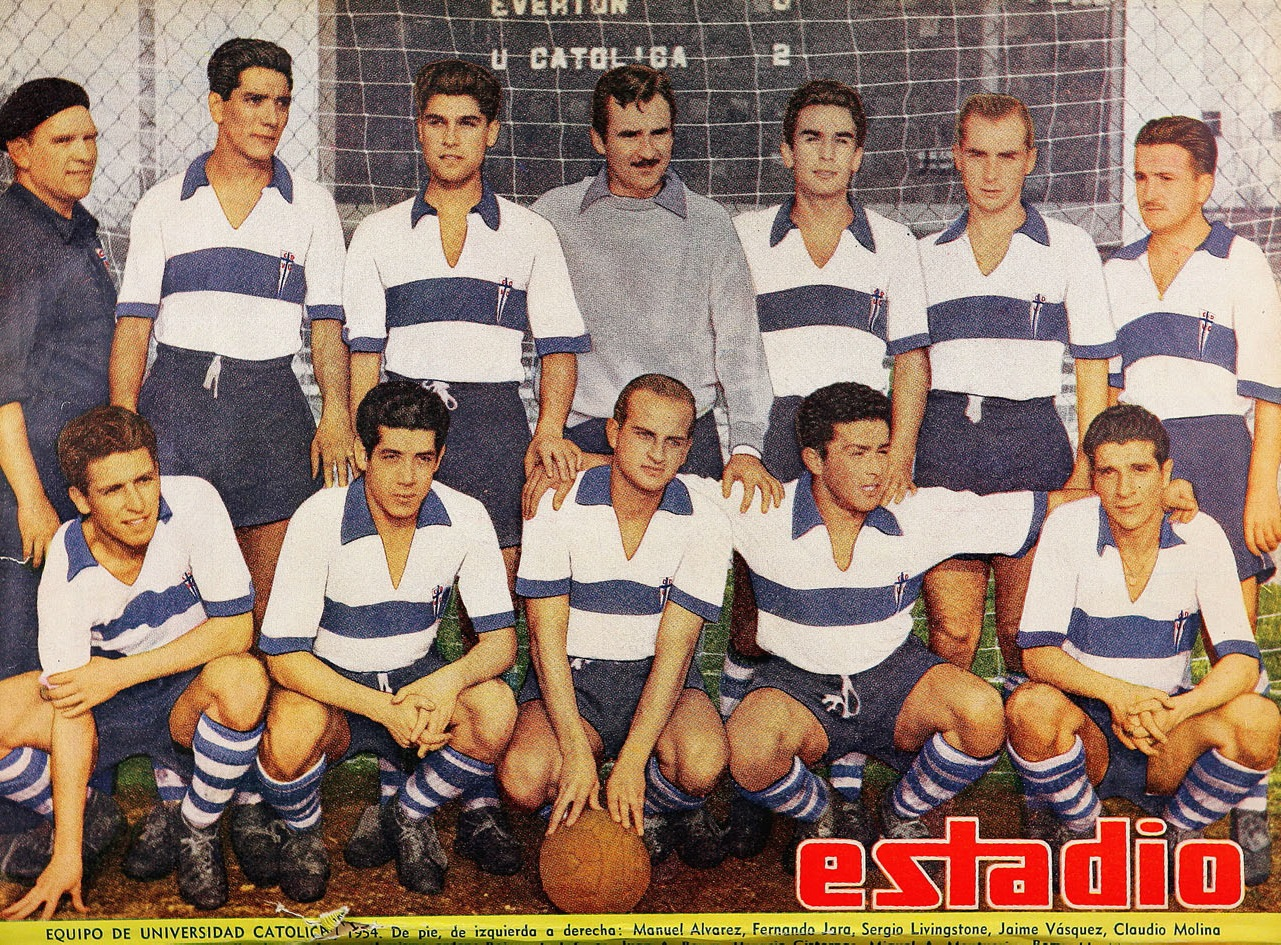
- Dates: 24 April 1954 – 9 January 1955
- Champions: Universidad Católica (2nd title)
- Relegated: Iberia
- Matches: 225
- Goals: 849 (3.77 per match)
- Top goalscorer: Jorge Robledo (25 goals)
- Biggest away win: Universidad Católica 0–7 Santiago Wanderers (14 November)
- Highest attendance: 57,234 Colo-Colo 0–0 Universidad Católica (8 August)
- Total attendance: 2,038,168
- Average attendance: 9,058

The 1954 Campeonato Nacional de Fútbol Profesional was first tier's 22nd season which Universidad Católica reached its second professional title. Highlighting, this was the first Primera División tournament with relegation system.

== Format ==
The regular phase's first eight teams qualify to the Championship playoffs where they played seven games which were added to his first stage (regular phase) points, whilst the rest of the teams (from the 9th position to 14th position) disputed the relegation playoffs (five games with the same criteria) to determine the only one relegated team.

== First stage ==
=== Scores ===
	AUD	COL	EVE	FEB	GCR	IBE	MAG	PAL	RAN	SMO	UES	UCA	UCH	SWA
Audax		2–3	2–2	1–1	1–1	2–2	3–1	4–0	3–2	1–1	1–1	1–2	2–2	2–2
Colo-Colo	1–2		4–2	1–0	3–4	3–0	3–1	2–3	4–0	5–2	3–0	2–1	1–3	3–2
Everton	1–1	1–4		1–2	1–3	3–2	2–2	1–2	2–0	0–0	0–2	3–2	3–0	2–0
Ferrobádminton	3–0	2–0	2–0		2–0	5–3	2–3	4–3	2–2	6–1	5–1	2–3	4–2	2–3
Green Cross	3–3	1–3	1–0	1–1		2–1	1–1	1–1	2–1	1–2	0–3	1–2	2–2	0–3
Iberia	5–3	2–3	3–2	0–4	0–4		0–1	1–3	1–2	2–0	3–2	2–2	2–0	1–0
Magallanes	0–6	0–1	1–1	2–0	1–2	3–2		2–2	1–1	5–1	2–1	2–0	0–0	5–0
Palestino	2–3	2–0	2–0	4–4	5–1	1–1	2–2		3–3	3–3	1–1	1–3	2–1	2–3
Rangers	3–1	2–2	1–2	2–1	0–1	4–3	2–0	2–2		3–1	2–2	0–3	3–1	2–2
S. Morning	2–2	0–1	2–4	1–1	3–2	4–3	3–1	1–2	1–1		3–5	1–2	4–1	0–4
U. Española	0–2	2–2	2–1	4–1	2–1	1–1	1–1	0–4	1–1	0–6		2–0	2–4	2–1
U. Católica	3–0	2–1	4–0	4–3	0–0	5–3	0–1	4–2	1–0	2–1	3–1		5–0	0–7
U. de Chile	1–2	0–3	1–2	3–3	4–3	3–2	0–0	1–0	4–3	1–6	0–2	0–0		0–0
S. Wanderers	1–3	1–0	1–0	2–2	2–4	3–3	4–3	4–1	2–0	1–1	3–1	6–1	0–2	

=== Standings ===
Pos	Team	Pld	W	D	L	GF	GA	GD	Pts	Qualification
1	Universidad Católica	26	16	3	7	54	42	+12	35	Qualify to the Championship playoffs
2	Colo-Colo	26	16	2	8	58	37	+21	34	Qualify to the Championship playoffs
3	Santiago Wanderers	26	12	6	8	57	42	+15	30	Qualify to the Championship playoffs
4	Ferrobádminton	26	11	7	8	64	47	+17	29	Qualify to the Championship playoffs
5	Audax Italiano	26	9	11	6	53	45	+8	29	Qualify to the Championship playoffs
6	Palestino	26	9	9	8	55	52	+3	27	Qualify to the Championship playoffs
7	Magallanes	26	9	9	8	41	40	+1	27	Qualify to the Championship playoffs
8	Green Cross	26	9	7	10	42	47	−5	25	Qualify to the Championship playoffs
9	Unión Española	26	9	7	10	41	51	−10	25	Qualify to the Relegation playoffs
10	Rangers	26	7	9	10	42	48	−6	23	Qualify to the Relegation playoffs
11	Santiago Morning	26	7	7	12	50	59	−9	21	Qualify to the Relegation playoffs
12	Everton	26	8	5	13	36	46	−10	21	Qualify to the Relegation playoffs
13	Universidad de Chile	26	7	7	12	36	56	−20	21	Qualify to the Relegation playoffs
14	Iberia	26	6	5	15	48	65	−17	17	Qualify to the Relegation playoffs

== Championship stage ==
=== Scores ===
	AUD	COL	FEB	GCR	MAG	PAL	UCA	SWA
Audax		2–2	1–1	2–2	1–0	4–2	3–0	2–1
Colo-Colo			3–4	2–1	7–3	2–0	0–0	2–3
Ferrobádminton				0–0	4–2	4–4	2–2	1–1
Green Cross					2–1	4–1	2–2	0–0
Magallanes						2–1	3–3	1–1
Palestino							2–4	2–3
U. Católica								2–1
S. Wanderers								

=== Standings ===
Pos	Team	Pld	W	D	L	GF	GA	GD	Pts
1	Audax Italiano	7	4	3	0	15	8	+7	11
2	Ferrobádminton	7	2	5	0	16	13	+3	9
3	Colo-Colo	7	3	2	2	18	13	+5	8
4	Green Cross	7	2	4	1	11	8	+3	8
5	Universidad Católica	7	2	4	1	13	13	0	8
6	Santiago Wanderers	7	2	3	2	10	10	0	7
7	Magallanes	7	1	2	4	12	19	−7	4
8	Palestino	7	0	1	6	12	23	−11	1

== Relegation stage ==
=== Scores ===
	EVE	IBE	RAN	SMO	UES	UCH
Everton		1–2	1–5	1–2	3–0	3–4
Iberia			0–5	0–5	3–4	1–1
Rangers				1–4	2–2	0–3
S. Morning					3–1	3–2
U. Española						1–2
U. de Chile						

=== Standings ===
Pos	Team	Pld	W	D	L	GF	GA	GD	Pts
1	Santiago Morning	5	5	0	0	17	5	+12	10
2	Universidad de Chile	5	3	1	1	12	8	+4	7
3	Rangers	5	2	1	2	13	10	+3	5
4	Unión Española	5	1	1	3	8	13	−5	3
5	Iberia	5	1	1	3	6	16	−10	3
6	Everton	5	1	0	4	9	13	−4	2

== Aggregate table ==
Pos	Team	Pld	W	D	L	GF	GA	GD	Pts	Qualification or relegation
1	Universidad Católica	33	18	7	8	67	55	+12	43	Champions
2	Colo-Colo	33	19	4	10	76	50	+26	42	
3	Audax Italiano	33	13	14	6	68	53	+15	40	
4	Ferrobádminton	33	13	12	8	80	60	+20	38	
5	Santiago Wanderers	33	14	9	10	67	52	+15	37	
6	Green Cross	33	11	11	11	53	55	−2	33	
7	Magallanes	33	10	11	12	53	59	−6	31	
8	Palestino	33	9	10	14	67	75	−8	28	
9	Santiago Morning	31	12	7	12	67	64	+3	31	
10	Rangers	31	9	10	12	55	58	−3	28	
11	Universidad de Chile	31	10	8	13	49	64	−15	28	
12	Unión Española	31	10	8	13	48	64	−16	28	
13	Everton	31	9	5	17	45	59	−14	23	
14	Iberia	31	7	6	18	54	81	−27	20	Relegated to Segunda División

== Topscorer ==
Name	Team	Goals
(Chile) Jorge Robledo	Colo-Colo	25
