= 1942 Campeonato Nacional Primera División =

Campeonato Nacional de Fútbol Profesional
- Dates: 6 June 1942 – 8 November 1942
- Champions: Santiago Morning (1st title)
- Matches: 90
- Goals: 349 (3.88 per match)
- Top goalscorer: Domingo Romo (16 goals)
- Biggest home win: Unión Española 7–1 Santiago National (5 July)
- Total attendance: 297,874
- Average attendance: 3,309

The 1942 Campeonato Nacional de Fútbol Profesional was Chilean first tier’s 10th season. Santiago Morning was the tournament’s champion, winning its first title.

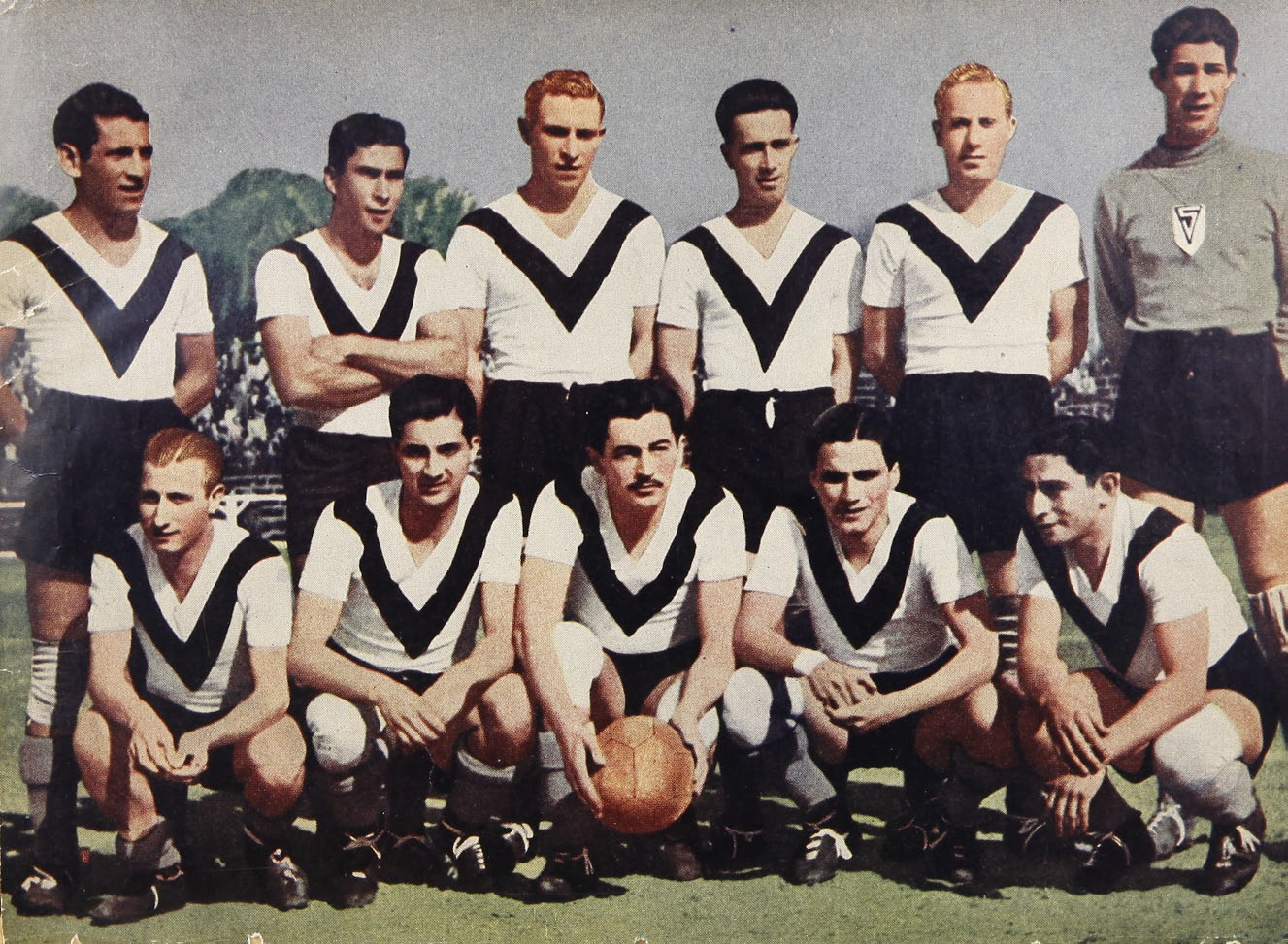
Santiago Morning's 1942 champion team

== Scores ==
	AUD	BAD	COL	GCR	MAG	SMO	SNA	UES	UCA	UCH
Audax		2–2	0–2	4–1	2–3	2–0	3–1	3–0	1–0	1–1
Bádminton	4–2		2–4	2–3	2–2	0–1	4–2	2–2	1–3	2–2
Colo-Colo	1–1	0–1		6–1	0–2	0–2	4–2	4–1	3–1	0–0
Green Cross	3–2	2–2	3–3		0–5	1–2	6–1	0–3	2–1	2–2
Magallanes	2–3	4–1	1–1	0–2		1–5	4–1	2–1	3–2	1–0
S. Morning	5–1	4–0	1–2	2–2	4–2		2–0	3–0	3–0	3–1
S. National	0–0	1–6	0–1	3–6	1–3	3–7		0–1	2–2	1–5
U. Española	3–1	2–1	0–3	1–2	2–3	1–5	7–1		2–4	1–2
U. Católica	1–0	0–0	0–6	0–2	0–2	1–1	2–3	1–6		0–2
U. de Chile	1–2	3–1	2–2	1–1	1–2	1–1	2–1	1–3	1–1	

== Standings ==
Pos	Team	Pld	W	D	L	GF	GA	GD	Pts	Qualification
1	Santiago Morning	18	13	3	2	51	18	+33	29	Champions
2	Magallanes	18	13	2	3	48	28	+20	28	
3	Colo-Colo	18	10	5	3	42	20	+22	25	
4	Green Cross	18	7	5	6	39	46	−7	19	
5	Universidad de Chile	18	5	8	5	28	25	+3	18	
6	Audax Italiano	18	7	4	7	30	30	0	18	
7	Unión Española	18	7	1	10	36	38	−2	15	
8	Badminton	18	4	6	8	33	39	−6	14	
9	Universidad Católica	18	3	4	11	19	40	−21	10	
10	Santiago National	18	1	2	15	23	65	−42	4	

Campeonato Profesional
1942 champions

1st title

== Topscorer ==
Name	Team	Goals
(Chile) Domingo Romo	Santiago Morning	16
