= Fernando Espinosa (Chilean footballer) =

Chilean footballer (1949–2023)

Personal information
- Full name: Fernando Ernesto Espinosa Moreira
- Date of birth: 1 February 1949
- Place of birth: Independencia, Santiago, Chile
- Date of death: 16 May 2023 (aged 74)
- Place of death: Santiago, Chile
- Height: 1.67 m (5 ft 6 in)
- Position: Forward

Youth career
- Población Alessandri
- Santiago Wanderers
- Universidad Técnica

Senior career*
Years	Team	Apps	(Gls)
1968	Universidad Técnica		
1969–1972	Magallanes	82	(56)
1973–1974	Palestino	32	(12)
1974–1975	Magallanes	59	(29)
1976–1977	Santiago Wanderers	44	(11)
1978	Tipografía Nacional		
1979	Deportes Linares		
1980	Naval		

International career
1972–1973	Chile	4	(0)
- * Club domestic league appearances and goals

Fernando Ernesto Espinosa Moreira (1 February 1949 – 16 May 2023), frequently and wrongly named as Fernando Espinoza, was a Chilean footballer who played as a forward for clubs in Chile and Guatemala.

== Club career ==
At the youth level, Espinosa played with Población Alessandri from Estación Central, Santiago Wanderers and Universidad Técnica.

He made his senior debut with Universidad Técnica in the 1968 Segunda División. In that division, he also played for Deportes Linares in 1979.

In the Chilean Primera División, he played for Magallanes, Palestino, Santiago Wanderers and Naval, his last club in 1980. He stood out as a player for Magallanes, becoming the league's top goalscorer in the 1972 season with 25 goals.

Abroad, he played for Guatemalan Liga Nacional side Tipografía Nacional in 1978.

== International career ==
Espinosa made four appearances for the Chile national team during 1972 in A-class matches against Mexico twice, Republic of Ireland and Iran. He also played in the unofficial match against Tahiti on 14 February 1973, scoring five goals in the 10–1 win.

== Personal life ==
He was nicknamed Polilla (Moth), an inherited nickname from his older brother, Hernán.

He died on 22 May 2023.
