= Rolando García (Chilean footballer) =

Chilean footballer (born 1942)

Personal information
- Full name: Rolando Moisés García Jiménez
- Date of birth: 15 December 1942 (age 83)
- Place of birth: Santiago, Chile
- Position: Right-back

Youth career
- Walter Müller

Senior career*
Years	Team	Apps	(Gls)
1964–1967	Ferrobádminton	33+	(1+)
1968–1973	Deportes Concepción	180	(5)
1974–1975	Colo-Colo	51	(0)
1976–1980	Deportes Concepción	124	(5)

International career
1971–1975	Chile	19	(1)

Managerial career
- 1983: Deportes Concepción
- 1985: Deportes Concepción
- 1986: Unión La Calera
- 1987: Chile B
- 1987–1988: Deportes Valdivia
- 1988: Unión San Felipe
- 1989: Deportes Antofagasta
- 1990: Lozapenco
- 1991: Ñublense
- 1992: Deportivo Valdivia
- 1992–1995: Huachipato
- 1995: Deportes Linares
- 1996: Ñublense
- 1996: Deportes Ovalle
- 1997: Cobresal
- 1998: Deportes Arica
- 1999–2001: Deportes Linares
- * Club domestic league appearances and goals

Rolando Moisés García Jiménez (born 15 December 1942) is a Chilean former football defender who played for Chile in the 1974 FIFA World Cup. He also played for Colo-Colo at club level.

== Playing career ==
Trained at club Walter Müller from Santiago, García played for Ferrobádminton, the club after Bádminton, Deportes Concepción and Colo-Colo in the Chilean Primera División. He won the 1965 Segunda División de Chile with Ferrobádminton and the 1974 Copa Chile with Colo-Colo.

At international level, García made 19 appearances for the Chile national team between 1971 and 1975.

== Managerial career ==
In 1987, García led the Chile B national team in the 1987 President's Cup International Football Tournament at the same time he was the manager of Deportes Valdivia.

== Honours ==
=== Player ===
Ferrobádminton

- Segunda División: 1965

Colo-Colo

- Copa Chile: 1974

Chile

- Copa del Pacífico: 1971
- Copa Juan Pinto Durán: 1971
- Copa Acosta Ñu: 1974
