= 1947 Campeonato Nacional Primera División =

Campeonato Nacional de Fútbol Profesional
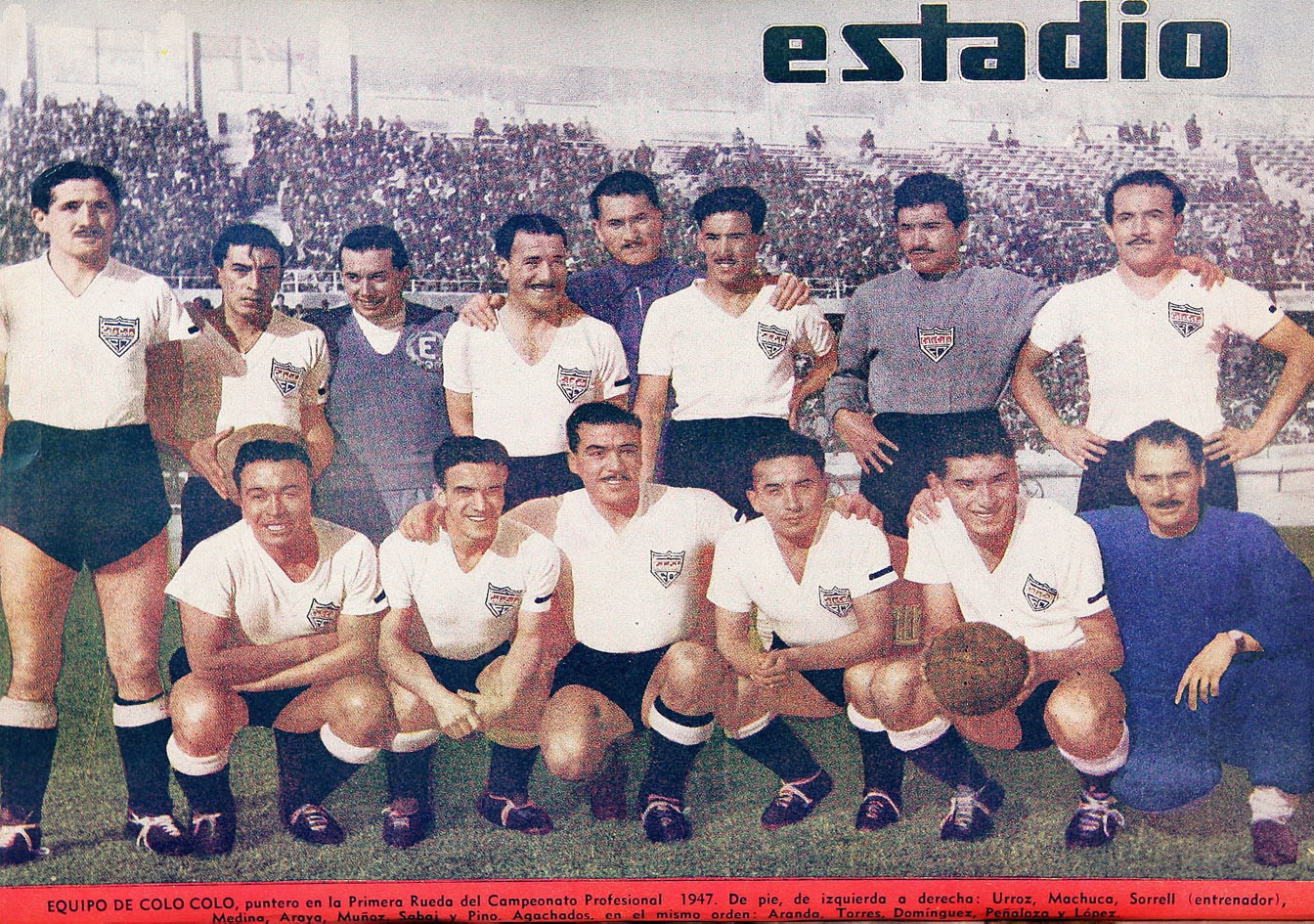
- Colo-Colo, champions
- Dates: 15 May 1947 – 23 November 1947
- Champions: Colo-Colo (5th title)
- Matches: 156
- Goals: 588 (3.77 per match)
- Top goalscorer: Apolonides Vera (17 goals)
- Biggest home win: Universidad Católica 8–2 Everton (29 June); Audax Italiano 8–2 Everton (8 November)
- Total attendance: 1,006,677
- Average attendance: 6,453

The 1947 Campeonato Nacional de Fútbol Profesional was Chilean first tier’s 15th season. Colo-Colo was the tournament’s champion, winning its fifth title.

== Scores ==
	AUD	BAD	COL	EVE	GCR	IBE	MAG	SMO	SNA	UES	UCA	UCH	SWA
Audax		1–3	2–1	8–2	4–3	5–1	3–1	0–1	2–3	1–5	1–2	1–1	0–1
Badminton	1–2		1–1	1–2	1–2	0–1	2–2	2–1	1–5	1–3	3–1	2–3	1–1
Colo-Colo	2–3	4–2		3–1	1–0	1–0	1–1	2–0	3–1	1–1	1–0	2–1	3–1
Everton	0–2	1–5	0–2		1–0	5–1	2–5	1–2	3–3	0–1	2–2	1–0	1–3
Green Cross	2–2	2–2	0–3	3–0		1–2	3–2	3–3	4–3	3–2	0–1	0–3	5–3
Iberia	0–2	1–0	0–1	4–1	1–2		1–1	1–2	0–1	1–5	1–1	1–2	1–3
Magallanes	2–2	2–5	0–1	3–0	3–1	0–4		3–0	3–2	2–3	4–3	3–0	1–1
S. Morning	0–2	2–4	0–2	2–3	1–3	1–2	3–4		3–0	1–1	2–2	0–2	3–4
S. National	4–3	0–3	0–5	5–6	4–2	2–3	2–2	2–4		2–1	0–2	3–1	0–1
U. Española	0–4	1–2	1–1	1–0	4–1	3–1	4–1	2–3	5–1		1–4	2–5	1–3
U. Católica	0–1	0–0	1–2	8–2	0–2	2–0	1–1	2–1	2–2	4–4		3–2	3–2
U. de Chile	2–3	2–2	2–2	3–0	1–2	2–1	2–1	2–1	1–3	0–0	4–0		1–1
S. Wanderers	1–2	2–4	3–3	0–1	2–1	4–1	4–2	0–3	4–1	1–4	1–1	0–2	

== Standings ==
Pos	Team	Pld	W	D	L	GF	GA	GD	Pts	Qualification
1	Colo-Colo	24	16	6	2	48	21	+27	38	Champions
2	Audax Italiano	24	14	3	7	56	38	+18	31	
3	Universidad de Chile	24	11	5	8	44	34	+10	27	
4	Unión Española	24	11	5	8	55	43	+12	27	
5	Universidad Católica	24	9	8	7	47	39	+8	26	
6	Santiago Wanderers	24	10	5	9	46	45	+1	25	
7	Badminton	24	9	6	9	48	42	+6	24	
8	Magallanes	24	8	7	9	49	50	−1	23	
9	Green Cross	24	10	3	11	45	51	−6	23	
10	Santiago National	24	8	3	13	49	64	−15	19	
11	Santiago Morning	24	7	3	14	39	49	−10	17	
12	Iberia	24	7	2	15	29	47	−18	16	
13	Everton	24	7	2	15	35	67	−32	16	

Campeonato Profesional
1947 champions
Colo-Colo
5th title

== Topscorer ==
Name	Team	Goals
(Chile) Apolonides Vera	Santiago National	17
