= 1941 Campeonato Nacional Primera División =

Campeonato Nacional de Fútbol Profesional
- Dates: 30 May 1941 – 8 November 1941
- Champions: Colo-Colo (3rd title)
- Matches: 90
- Goals: 407 (4.52 per match)
- Top goalscorer: José Profetta (19 goals)
- Biggest home win: Audax Italiano 6–1 Universidad Católica (15 June); Universidad de Chile 6–1 Santiago National J. (27 July)
- Total attendance: 320,029
- Average attendance: 3,636

The 1941 Campeonato Nacional de Fútbol Profesional was Chilean first tier’s 9th season. Colo-Colo was the tournament’s champion, winning its 3rd title.

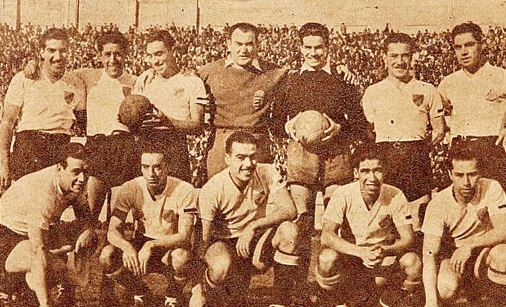
Colo-Colo's 1941 champion team

== Scores ==
	AUD	BAD	COL	GCR	MAG	SMO	SNJ	UES	UCA	UCH
Audax		3–1	0–3	1–0	2–2	2–3	3–1	6–2	6–1	4–1
Bádminton	3–1		0–1	2–5	3–3	2–2	2–1	2–5	4–5	1–5
Colo-Colo	3–3			3–1	5–1	2–2	6–3	2–2	5–1	2–1
Green Cross	3–2	1–3	1–5		2–0	2–3	2–3	1–4	2–3	4–2
Magallanes	0–3	2–1	2–2	5–1		2–2	4–1	1–3	3–2	4–2
S. Morning	1–1	5–4	0–3	2–0	2–2		2–0	4–2	4–2	3–1
S. National J.	1–1	5–4	2–3	5–3	1–1	4–1		1–1	3–4	1–6
U. Española	2–2	4–2	0–3		1–5	5–3	1–1		4–2	4–1
U. Católica	4–8	1–0	2–3	1–2	4–3	3–1	3–1	2–0		2–1
U. de Chile	4–3	4–2	2–4	0–1	0–1	0–2	1–2	3–3	3–2	

== Standings ==
Pos	Team	Pld	W	D	L	GF	GA	GD	Pts	Qualification
1	Colo-Colo	17	13	4	0	59	27	+32	30	Champions
2	Santiago Morning	18	8	6	4	38	34	+4	22	
3	Audax Italiano	18	8	5	5	51	35	+16	21	
4	Magallanes	18	7	6	5	41	37	+4	20	
5	Unión Española	17	7	5	5	43	41	+2	19	
6	Universidad Católica	18	9	0	9	40	49	−9	18	
7	Santiago National Juventus	18	5	4	9	36	48	−12	14	
8	Green Cross	17	6	0	11	31	44	−13	12	
9	Universidad de Chile	18	5	1	12	37	45	−8	11	
10	Badminton	17	3	3	11	33	49	−16	9	

Primera División de Chile
1941 champions
Colo-Colo
3rd title

== Topscorer ==
Name	Team	Goals
(Argentina) José Profetta	Santiago National	19
