= Francisco Urroz (footballer) =

Chilean footballer (1920–1992)

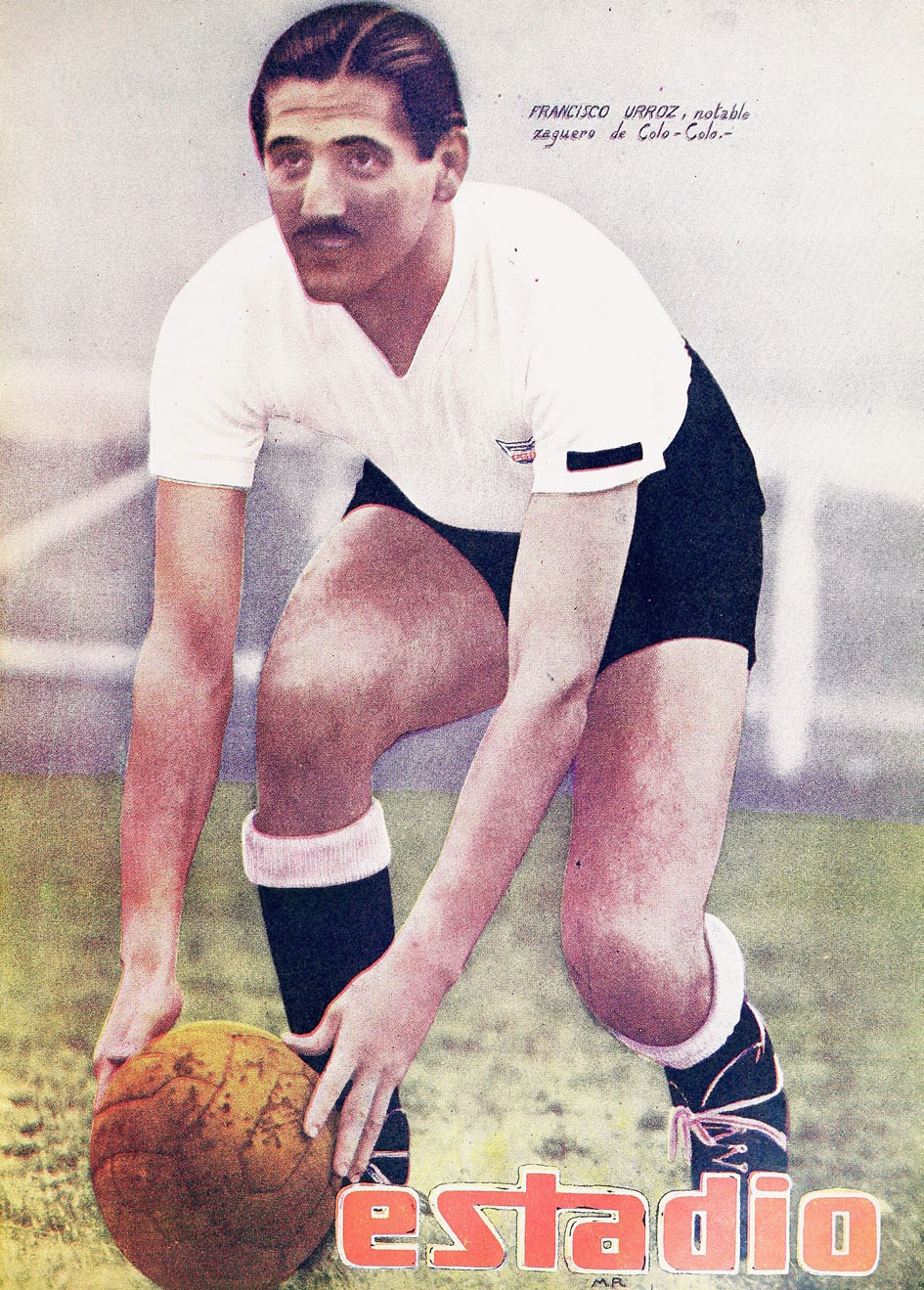
- Urroz with Colo-Colo in 1947

Personal information
- Full name: Francisco Urroz Martínez
- Date of birth: 14 December 1920
- Place of birth: Higuerote, Venezuela
- Date of death: 22 January 1992 (aged 71)
- Place of death: Concón, Chile
- Height: 1.80 m (5 ft 11 in)
- Position: Defender

Youth career
- 1931–1934: Unión Deportiva Española
- 1935–1939: Unión Española

Senior career*
Years	Team	Apps	(Gls)
1940–1944	Unión Española		
1945–1950	Colo-Colo		

International career
1947–1950	Chile	11	(0)
- * Club domestic league appearances and goals

Francisco Urroz Martínez (14 December 1920 – 22 January 1992) was a Chilean footballer who played as a defender.

== Club career ==
Urroz joined Unión Deportiva Española, the club previous to Unión Española, alongside his brothers Guillermo and Gilberto in 1931, thanks to his uncle Simón Martínez, a football leader. A member of the first team since 1940, he became the team captain and won the 1943 Primera División de Chile, the first league title for the club. Later, he switched to Colo-Colo and won the 1947 Primera División de Chile along with Colo-Colo.

== International career ==
Urroz made 11 appearances for the Chile national team, playing also in the 1950 FIFA World Cup.

== Personal life ==
Urroz was born in Higuerote, Venezuela, and died in Concón, Chile, on 22 January 1992, aged 71. His father, Francisco Sr., was a fruits and vegetables seller who died when Francisco Jr. was 13 years old.

He was the father of the tennis player Silvana Urroz and grandfather of both the field hockey player Manuela Urroz - who also played football at youth categories for Unión Española - and the rugby union player and doctor Francisco Urroz.

== Honours ==
Unión Española

- Chilean Primera División: 1943

Colo-Colo

- Chilean Primera División: 1947
