= Instituto O'Higgins (disambiguation) =

Instituto O'Higgins may refer to:

- Instituto O'Higgins (O'Higgins Institute) of Rancagua
- Instituto O'Higgins (O'Higgins Institute) of Maipú
- the Instituto O'Higginiano de Chile (O'Higginian Institute of Chile)
