= Asociación de Fútbol de Santiago =

Chile's association of soccer clubs

The Asociación de Fútbol de Santiago (also known as AFS) was the first organization in Chile to organize football tournament. It was formed in 1903 and organized non-professional football in Santiago. Later on, it was the organization responsible for holding the national professional football league in Chile.

== History ==
=== Establishment ===
In the early twentieth century, in Santiago there did not exist any organization for the various college football clubs that were emerging and therefore no any football tournament was contested, unlike what happened in Valparaíso, where competitions were held by the Football Association of Chile since 1895 and there was a championship each year. In the capital, matches were limited to football friendlies, and there was a lack of organization to unify the rules, and it was also very common for players to continually change their club.

Faced with the growing number of teams (around 50), it was "... essential to the formation of the Association in Santiago." The Asociación de Fútbol de Santiago (AFS) was founded on 15 May 1903, in the building of the Commodities Exchange (Bolsa de Comercio), where there came representatives of 14 football clubs in Santiago. The first Board of Directors of the AFS was formed by July Subercaseaux (Santiago National) as Honorary President, Jose A. Alfonso (Atlético Unión) as chairman; Oscar Diener (Santiago National) as Treasurer; Jorge D. Ewing (Atlético Unión) as Secretary; and Luis de la Carrera (Thunder) as Pro-Secretary.

At its first ordinary meeting, the recent Board of Directors, in the presence of representatives from 16 clubs which agreed to restrict the enrollment of the tournament, divided the clubs into two categories owing to the large number of teams. A First Division, including Thunder, Santiago National, Atlético Unión, Britania, Victoria and the Instituto Pedagógico, and a Second Division, comprising the Victoria Rangers, Brasil F.C., Chilean Star, Chile F.C., Cambridge, Bandera de Chile, Balmaceda F.C., Victorioso, Wilmington and the second team of Thunder, were set up.

The first football championship played in Santiago, called Copa Subercaseaux in honor of the Honorary Chairman of the AFS who donated the trophy, commenced on May 31, 1903, before a presence of "... no fewer than three thousand people." The first champions of this tournament were Atlético Unión, while the tournament champion of Second Division, called the Copa Junior, was the Victoria Rangers. In 1906 the Copa Subercaseaux was renamed Copa Unión.

In 1904, a team called Baquedano is accepted as a member of the tournament, who changed its name to Magallanes Atlético after a few months, moving quickly renamed Magallanes Football Club, and, in 1922, Club Social y Deportivo Magallanes. Later on it was one of the founders of professionalism in Chile, and was the first champion of the Primera División de Chile in 1933.

=== Other football organizations ===
Initially, the AFS had no desire to create an organization that was integrating the multitude of clubs that were forming in the capital, but rather just restricting to a certain type of clubs. Following this, emerged in the early years of the twentieth century, there were several football associations in Santiago, among which were the Asociación Arturo Prat (1905), the Asociación Obrera de Fútbol (1906), the Asociación José Arrieta (1907), the Asociación Nacional de Fútbol (1908), the Liga Santiago (1914) and the Liga Metropolitana (1916), among others.

Asociación Arturo Prat (AAP), for example, was founded on July 4, 1905, by the councilor Arturo Izquierdo Cerda, and was organized by the Municipality of Santiago. It was established with the primary objective "... to spread the game of foot ball and other athletic exercises between the working class and the students." Despite the municipal support, the AAP was unable to match the might of the AFS, founded two years earlier, and could only concentrated its activity on school football and was losing prominence over the years. Some of its best teams joined the AFS, such as Gimnástico and the Arco Iris F.C.. Finally, the AAP was dissolved in 1912.

The main legacy left by the AAP, along with expanding the spread of football to other sectors of society, was the activity of a number of clubs made up of students, for example, Escuela de Artes y Oficios, the Escuela de Minería and the Internado F.C.; and the workers club Gutemberg F.C., Gimnástico F.C. and Arco Iris F.C.

=== After the unification of national football ===
After the unification of the national football federations of which occurred in 1926, the championship is now called the Liga Central de Football (Central Football League). Because of the large number of teams, the championship was divided into different series in 1927 and 1928. The league was reorganized into three divisions, under which involved a total of 38 clubs, due to the great sporting and economic gap that existed between the various clubs in the league.

In 1930, the championship called Santiago de Football Association again, and the First Division consisted of Audax Italiano, Unión Española, Colo-Colo, Carabineros, Magallanes, Santiago Badminton, Green Cross, Santiago Football Club, Santiago National and Gimnástico Arturo Prat.

In late 1932 the conflict between the so-called big clubs and AFS became untenable, thus causing the split of the clubs to form the professional league, named Liga Profesional de Fútbol (LPF). While initially the AFS refused to recognize the new organization, in 1934, by the provision of the Federación de Fútbol de Chile, it became part of AFS.

== List of seasons ==
Ed.	Season		Champion (title count)	Runner-up
Asociación de Football de Santiago
1	1903	Copa Subercaseaux	Atlético Unión (1)	Thunder
2	1904	Copa Subercaseaux	Atlético Unión (2)	Thunder
3	1905	Medallas Unión	Atlético Unión (3)	Thunder
4	1906	Copa Unión	No finished	
5	1907	Copa Unión	Loma Blanca (1)	English
6	1908	Copa Unión	Magallanes (1)	Santiago National
7	1909	Copa Unión	Gimnástico (1)	National Star
8	1910	Copa Unión	Gimnástico (2)	English
9	1911	Copa Unión	Eleuterio Ramírez (1)	Santiago National
10	1912	Copa Unión	Gimnástico (3)	
11	1913	Copa Unión	Magallanes (2)	Wellington
12	1914	Copa Unión	Arco Iris (1)	Instituto Nacional
13	1915	Copa Unión	Instituto Nacional (1)	Gimnástico
14	1916	Copa Unión A	Magallanes (3)	Instituto Nacional
15	1917	Copa Unión A	Cinco de Abril (1)	Arco Iris
16	1918	Copa Unión A	Eleuterio Ramírez (2)	Liverpool
17	1919	Copa Unión	Arco Iris (2); Liverpool (1); Gimnástico (4)	Eleuterio Ramírez
18	1920	Copa Unión	Ibérico Balompié (1); Magallanes (4)	No second-place awarded
19	1921	Copa Unión	Gimnástico (5); Brigada Central (1)	No second-place awarded
20	1922	Copa Unión	Audax Italiano (1); Brigada Central (2)	No second-place awarded
21	1923	Copa Unión	Internado (1)	Brigada Central
22	1924	Copa República	Jorge V (1)	Brigada Central
22	1924	Copa Chile	Unión Deportiva Española (1)	Santiago
23	1925	Copa República	Brigada Central (3)	Gimnástico
23	1925	Copa Chile	Unión Deportiva Española (2)	Internado
24	1926	Copa República	Brigada Central (4)	Gimnástico
24	1926	Copa Chile	Santiago (1)	
Liga Central de Football de Santiago
25	1927	Serie de Honor	Brigada Central (5)	Audax Italiano
26	1928	Serie A	Unión Deportiva Española (3)	Liverpool Wanderers
26	1928	Serie B	Brigada Central (6)	Unión Sportivo Mac Kay
26	1928	Serie C	Santiago (2)	Loma Blanca
26	1928	Serie D	Teniente Godoy (1)	Carioca
26	1928	Serie E	Magallanes (5)	Santiago National
26	1928	Serie F	Colo-Colo (1)	Gimnástico Arturo Prat
27	1929	Primera División	Colo-Colo (2)	Carabineros de Chile
Asociación de Football de Santiago
28	1930	División de Honor	Colo-Colo (3)	Bádminton
29	1931	División de Honor	Audax Italiano (1)	Magallanes
30	1932	División de Honor	Colo-Colo (4); Audax Italiano (2)	No second-place awarded
Defunct Tournament (See: Primera División)
