= Bernardo Araya =

Chilean futsal player (born 1993)

Personal information
- Full name: Bernardo Jesús Araya Ponce
- Date of birth: 5 June 1993 (age 33)
- Place of birth: Puente Alto, Santiago, Chile
- Position: Defender

Team information
- Current team: Peñíscola FS
- Number: 4

Youth career
- Colo-Colo (football)
- Universidad de Chile (football)

Senior career*
Years	Team	Apps	(Gls)
2012	Deportes Tocopilla (football)		
2013	Palestino		
2013–2014	Deportes Concepción		
2018–2021	Newell's Old Boys		
2021	Nantes Métropole		
2022	San Lorenzo		
2023	Yeesco Sercesa		
2024–2024	Umuarama		
2024–2025	Burela FS	30	
2025–	Peñíscola FS		

International career
2013–2015	Chile U23		
2015–	Chile		
- * Club domestic league appearances and goals

Bernardo Jesús Araya Ponce (born 5 June 1993) is a Chilean futsal player who plays as a defender for Spanish club Peñíscola FS. Besides Chile, he has played in Spain, Argentina, France and Brazil.

== Career ==
As a youth footballer, Araya was with both Colo-Colo and Universidad de Chile at under-17 and under-18 level, respectively. Next he spent a season with Deportes Tocopilla.

In 2013 he switched to futsal after a trial to join Chile national futsal team alongside his best friend. Having played for both Palestino and Deportes Concepción in his homeland, in 2018 he moved to Argentine side Newell's Old Boys.

As a member of Newell's Old Boys, he got three consecutive promotions and played at all categories of the Argentine futsal.

In 2021, he moved to French side Nantes Métropole, becoming the first Chilean futsal player to be transferred to Europe.

Due to a serious knee injury, he returned to Argentina in 2022 and joined San Lorenzo, winning the league title and the Copa Argentina.

In 2023, he joined Brazilian club Yeesco Sercesa in the Liga Gaúcha, becoming the first Chilean to play in the Brazilian futsal and winning the Série Ouro of the Federação Gaúcha. The next season, he switched to Umuarama, becoming the first Chilean to play in the LNF, the premier brazilian futsal league.

In August 2024, Araya joined Spanish club Burela FS in the Primera División de Futsal becoming the first Chilean to play in the Spanish futsal. On 2 July 2025, he switched to Peñíscola FS.

== International career ==
Araya has taken part of the Chile national futsal team since under-23 level, becoming the team captain at senior level.

== Personal life ==
Araya is the younger brother of Karen Araya, a Chilean professional footballer.

== Honours ==
Yeesco Sercesa

- Copa dos Campeões: 2023
- Taça Farroupilha: 2023
- Série Ouro - Federação Gaúcha: 2023
