= 1963 Campeonato Nacional Segunda División =

Segunda División
- Season: 1960
- Champions: Green Cross
- Promoted: Green Cross
- Relegated: Valparaíso Ferroviarios

The 1963 Segunda División de Chile was the 12th season of the Segunda División de Chile.

Green Cross was the tournament's winner.

== Table ==
| Pos | Team | Pld | W | D | L | GF | GA | GD | Pts |
|---|---|---|---|---|---|---|---|---|---|
| 1 | Green Cross (C, P) | 26 | 17 | 7 | 2 | 58 | 29 | +29 | 41 |
| 2 | Trasandino | 26 | 15 | 6 | 5 | 63 | 31 | +32 | 36 |
| 3 | Deportes Temuco | 26 | 13 | 9 | 4 | 52 | 25 | +27 | 35 |
| 4 | Ovalle Ferroviarios | 26 | 11 | 8 | 7 | 42 | 34 | +8 | 30 |
| 5 | Lister Rossel | 26 | 10 | 7 | 9 | 38 | 41 | −3 | 27 |
| 6 | Universidad Técnica del Estado | 26 | 10 | 6 | 10 | 49 | 50 | −1 | 26 |
| 7 | San Antonio Unido | 26 | 9 | 8 | 9 | 40 | 43 | −3 | 26 |
| 8 | Iberia | 26 | 9 | 8 | 9 | 37 | 41 | −4 | 26 |
| 9 | Deportes Colchagua | 26 | 9 | 7 | 10 | 31 | 34 | −3 | 25 |
| 10 | Luis Cruz Martínez | 26 | 8 | 8 | 10 | 42 | 44 | −2 | 24 |
| 11 | Ñublense | 26 | 7 | 7 | 12 | 38 | 51 | −13 | 21 |
| 12 | Municipal de Santiago | 26 | 7 | 6 | 13 | 34 | 46 | −12 | 20 |
| 13 | San Bernardo Central | 26 | 3 | 11 | 12 | 29 | 48 | −19 | 17 |
| 14 | Valparaíso Ferroviarios (R) | 26 | 2 | 6 | 18 | 32 | 68 | −36 | 10 |

Source: rsssf.com
(C) Champions; (P) Promoted; (R) Relegated

== See also ==
- Chilean football league system
