= 1966 Campeonato Nacional Segunda División =

Segunda División
- Season: 1966
- Champions: Huachipato
- Promoted: Huachipato
- Relegated: None

The 1966 Segunda División de Chile was the 15th season of the Segunda División de Chile.

Huachipato was the tournament's champion.

== Table ==
Pos	Team	Pld	W	D	L	GF	GA	GD	Pts
1	Huachipato (C, P)	30	23	3	4	65	23	+42	49
2	Coquimbo Unido	30	18	6	6	52	24	+28	42
3	San Antonio Unido	30	15	9	6	51	39	+12	39
4	Trasandino	30	14	4	12	47	42	+5	32
5	Universidad Técnica del Estado	30	12	8	10	51	46	+5	32
6	Ñublense	30	12	8	10	48	44	+4	32
7	Lister Rossel	30	12	6	12	49	43	+6	30
8	Deportes Colchagua	30	11	6	13	46	51	−5	28
9	Lota Schwager	30	7	13	10	37	47	−10	27
10	Municipal de Santiago	30	10	6	14	51	53	−2	26
11	Antofagasta Portuario	30	8	10	12	44	55	−11	26
12	Deportes Ovalle	30	9	8	13	25	38	−13	26
13	Concepción	30	9	7	14	43	49	−6	25
14	Iberia-Puente Alto	30	7	10	13	38	50	−12	24
15	Luis Cruz Martínez (R)	30	6	11	13	38	50	−12	23
16	San Bernardo Central (R)	30	6	7	17	34	65	−31	19

Source: rsssf.com
(C) Champions; (P) Promoted; (R) Relegated

== See also ==
- Chilean football league system
