= 1965 Campeonato Nacional Segunda División =

Segunda División
- Season: 1965
- Champions: Ferrobádminton
- Promoted: Ferrobádminton
- Relegated: None

The 1965 Segunda División de Chile was the 14th season of the Segunda División de Chile.

Ferrobádminton was the tournament's champion.

== Table ==
Pos	Team	Pld	W	D	L	GF	GA	GD	Pts
1	Ferrobádminton (C, P)	36	17	15	4	57	30	+27	49
2	Huachipato	36	17	12	7	52	31	+21	46
3	Deportes Colchagua	36	15	11	10	66	51	+15	41
4	Municipal de Santiago	36	14	10	12	50	45	+5	38
5	Luis Cruz Martínez	36	13	11	12	59	48	+11	37
6	Ñublense	36	12	13	11	50	51	−1	37
7	San Antonio Unido	36	13	11	12	48	51	−3	37
8	Trasandino	36	14	8	14	44	48	−4	36
9	Deportes Ovalle	36	11	13	12	43	41	+2	35
10	Lister Rossel	36	12	11	13	63	61	+2	35
11	San Bernardo Central	36	7	16	13	36	47	−11	30
12	Universidad Técnica	36	7	10	19	42	68	−26	24
13	Iberia-Puente Alto	36	6	11	19	38	76	−38	23

Source: rsssf.com
(C) Champions; (P) Promoted

== See also ==
- Chilean football league system
