= 1958 Campeonato Nacional Segunda División =

Segunda División
- Season: 1958
- Champions: San Luis de Quillota
- Promoted: San Luis de Quillota
- Relegated: None

The 1958 Segunda División de Chile was the 7th season of the Segunda División de Chile.

San Luis de Quillota was the tournament's winner.

== Table ==
Pos	Team	Pld	W	D	L	GF	GA	GD	Pts
1	San Luis de Quillota (C, P)	27	20	4	3	72	22	+50	44
2	Santiago Morning	27	16	6	5	52	28	+24	38
3	San Fernando	27	14	6	7	45	33	+12	34
4	Unión La Calera	27	13	4	10	47	43	+4	30
5	Unión San Felipe	27	12	5	10	42	47	−5	29
6	Trasandino	27	12	4	11	44	40	+4	28
7	San Bernardo Central	27	8	4	15	35	55	−20	20
8	Alianza	27	6	7	14	48	53	−5	19
9	Iberia	27	3	9	15	27	54	−27	15
10	Universidad Técnica del Estado	27	4	5	18	34	71	−37	13

Source: rsssf.com
(C) Champions; (P) Promoted

== See also ==
- Chilean football league system
