= 1969 Campeonato Nacional Segunda División =

Segunda División
- Season: 1969
- Champions: Lota Schwager
- Promoted: Lota Schwager
- Relegated: None
- Top goalscorer: Andrés Gomez (20 goals); Iberia

The 1969 Segunda División de Chile was the 18th season of the Segunda División de Chile.

Lota Schwager was the tournament's champion.

== Table ==
Pos	Team	Pld	W	D	L	GF	GA	GD	Pts
1	Lota Schwager (C, P)	26	17	6	3	47	12	+35	40
2	Ñublense	26	14	8	4	37	20	+17	36
3	San Luis de Quillota	26	16	4	6	50	35	+15	36
4	Iberia	26	11	6	9	51	41	+10	28
5	Ferroviarios	26	9	8	9	48	46	+2	26
6	Unión San Felipe	26	9	8	9	33	40	−7	26
7	Municipal de Santiago	26	9	7	10	38	40	−2	25
8	Coquimbo Unido	26	8	8	10	37	33	+4	24
9	Lister Rossel	26	8	8	10	34	32	+2	24
10	Universidad Técnica	26	9	5	12	44	52	−8	23
11	Naval	26	8	6	12	29	35	−6	22
12	San Antonio Unido	26	6	9	11	24	28	−4	21
13	Deportes Colchagua	26	6	5	15	28	60	−32	17
14	Trasandino (R)	26	5	6	15	25	51	−26	16

Source: rsssf.com
(C) Champions; (P) Promoted; (R) Relegated

== See also ==
- Chilean football league system
