= 1955 Campeonato Nacional Segunda División =

Segunda División
- Season: 1955
- Champions: San Luis de Quillota
- Promoted: San Luis de Quillota
- Relegated: Santiago National

The 1955 Segunda División de Chile was the fourth season of the Segunda División de Chile.

San Luis de Quillota was the tournament's winner.

== Table ==
Pos	Team	Pld	W	D	L	GF	GA	GD	Pts
1	San Luis de Quillota (C, P)	21	13	6	2	39	13	+26	32
2	Unión La Calera	21	12	7	2	48	22	+26	31
3	Trasandino	21	10	3	8	40	35	+5	23
4	Iberia	21	9	4	8	43	32	+11	22
5	Universidad Técnica	21	8	5	8	26	24	+2	21
6	Alianza de Curicó	21	8	5	8	35	37	−2	21
7	Maestranza Central	21	5	4	12	34	41	−7	14
8	Santiago National (R)	21	1	2	18	26	87	−61	4

Source: rsssf.com
(C) Champions; (P) Promoted; (R) Relegated

== See also ==
- Chilean football league system
