= 1968 Campeonato Nacional Segunda División =

Segunda División
- Season: 1968
- Champions: Antofagasta Portuario
- Promoted: Antofagasta Portuario
- Relegated: None
- Top goalscorer: Fernando Pérez (25 goals); Universidad Técnica del Estado

The 1968 Segunda División de Chile was the 17th season of the Segunda División de Chile.

Antofagasta Portuario was the tournament's champion.

== Table ==
Pos	Team	Pld	W	D	L	GF	GA	GD	Pts	Qualification
1	Lister Rossel	26	14	5	7	44	31	+13	33	Championship Playoffs
2	Lota Schwager	26	13	5	8	59	38	+21	31	Championship Playoffs
3	Ñublense	26	12	7	7	42	31	+11	31	Championship Playoffs
4	Antofagasta Portuario	26	14	3	9	47	36	+11	31	Championship Playoffs
5	Universidad Técnica	26	11	7	8	51	34	+17	29	Championship Playoffs
6	Coquimbo Unido	26	11	7	8	39	31	+8	29	Championship Playoffs
7	San Luis de Quillota	26	11	6	9	35	30	+5	28	Championship Playoffs
8	Trasandino	26	9	8	9	39	40	−1	26	Championship Playoffs
9	Ferrobádminton	26	10	6	10	34	35	−1	26	Relegation Playoffs
10	Municipal de Santiago	26	10	5	11	39	39	0	25	Relegation Playoffs
11	Naval	26	9	7	10	37	40	−3	25	Relegation Playoffs
12	Deportes Colchagua	26	8	6	12	35	46	−11	22	Relegation Playoffs
13	San Antonio Unido	26	5	9	12	43	56	−13	19	Relegation Playoffs
14	Iberia-Puente Alto	26	3	3	20	24	81	−57	9	Relegation Playoffs

Source: rsssf.com

== Promotion playoffs ==
Pos	Team	Pld	W	D	L	GF	GA	GD	Pts	Qualification
1	Antofagasta Portuario (C, P)	14	11	2	1	28	12	+16	24	Champions. Promoted.
2	San Luis de Quillota	14	9	2	3	32	17	+15	20	
3	Lota Schwager	14	5	4	5	16	20	−4	14	
4	Lister Rossel	14	4	5	5	15	18	−3	13	
5	Universidad Técnica	14	4	3	7	25	26	−1	11	
6	Coquimbo Unido	14	4	3	7	24	29	−5	11	
7	Ñublense	14	3	4	7	18	23	−5	10	
8	Trasandino	14	3	3	8	10	23	−13	9	

Source: rsssf.com
(C) Champions; (P) Promoted

== Relegation playoffs ==
Pos	Team	Pld	W	D	L	GF	GA	GD	Pts	Qualification
1	Deportes Colchagua	10	5	5	0	22	15	+7	15	
2	Naval	10	6	2	2	23	14	+9	14	
3	Municipal de Santiago	10	5	2	3	23	15	+8	12	
4	San Antonio Unido	10	3	3	4	11	16	−5	9	
5	Ferrobádminton	10	3	0	7	24	28	−4	6	
6	Iberia-Puente Alto	10	1	2	7	13	28	−15	4	Suspended Relegation

Source: rsssf.com

== See also ==
- Chilean football league system
