= Alfonso Domínguez (Chilean footballer) =

Chilean footballer (1916-1973)

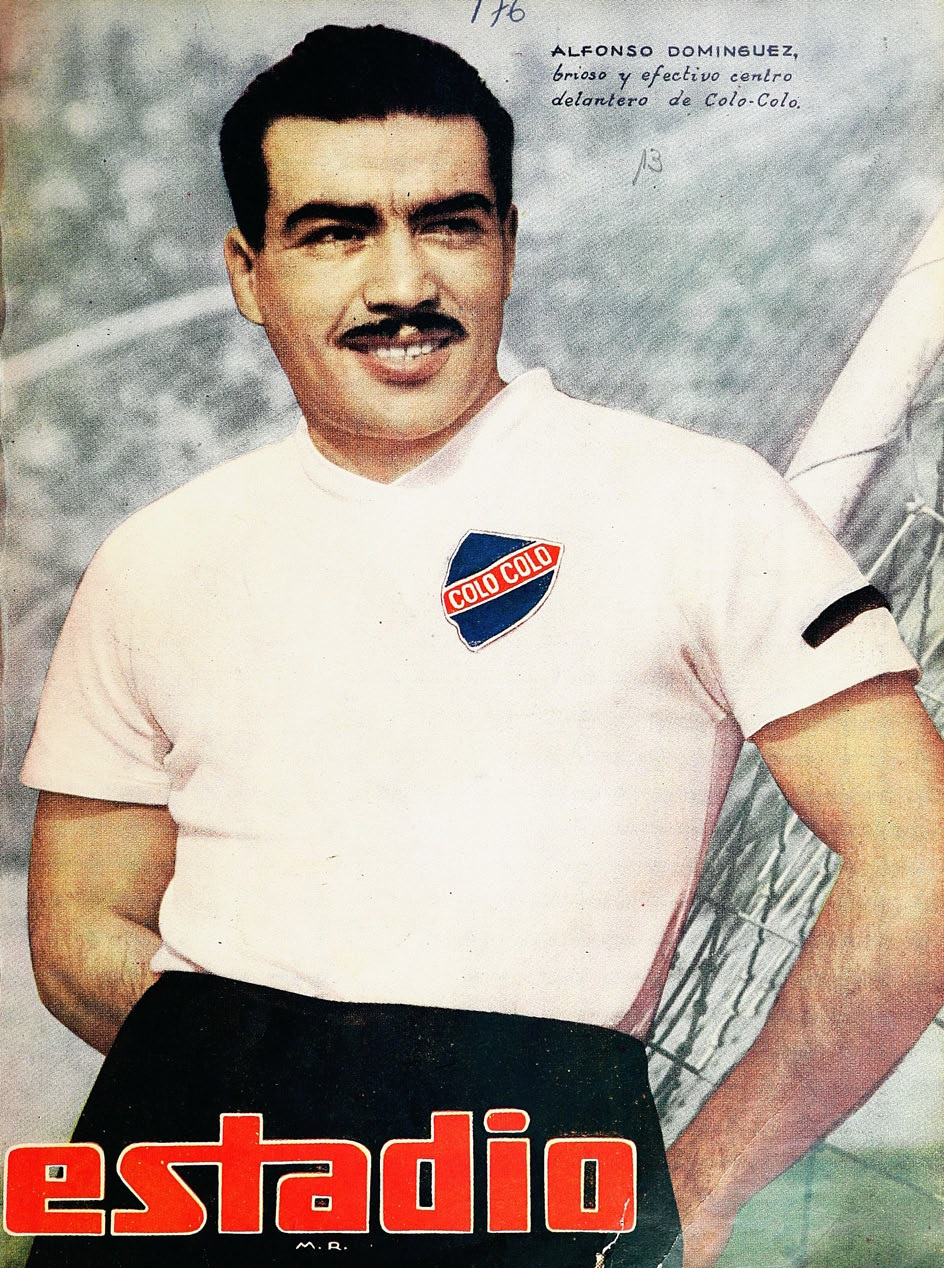
- Domínguez, Alfonso 1946 Estadio 0176

Personal information
- Full name: Luis Alfonso Domínguez Guíñez
- Date of birth: 18 December 1916
- Place of birth: Santiago, Chile
- Date of death: 23 April 1973 (aged 56)
- Position: Forward

Senior career*
Years	Team	Apps	(Gls)
1937	Bádminton		
1937–1938	Unión Española		
1939–1943	Colo-Colo		
1943	Universidad de Chile		
1944–1947	Colo-Colo		

International career
1939	Chile		
- * Club domestic league appearances and goals

Luis Alfonso Domínguez Guíñez (18 December 1916 in Santiago, Chile – 23 April 1973) was a Chilean footballer. He played as a forward. He was also part of Chile's squad for the 1939 South American Championship.

== Titles ==
- (Chile) Colo Colo 1939, 1941, 1944 and 1947 (Primera División), 1940 (Copa Apertura), 1945 (Champions Championship)

== Honours ==
- (Chile) Colo Colo 1939 and 1944 (Top Scorer Chilean Primera División Championship)
