= División de Honor Amateur (Chile) =

- Founded: 1943
- Folded: 1953
- Country: Chile
- Confederation: CONMEBOL
- Level on pyramid: 2 (1943–1953)
- Promotion to: Primera División

The División de Honor Amateur (usually called simply División de Ascenso) was the second division of Chilean football (soccer) in 1943 until 1953. The tournament was played on a home-and-away round-robin basis.

== Division levels ==
Year	Level	Promotion to
1943–1953	2	Primera División

== Champions ==
Ed.	Season	Champion	Runner-up
División de Ascenso (ACF)
1	1943	Maestranza Central	Metropolitano
2	1944	Bernardo O'Higgins	Iberia
3	1945	Iberia	Bernardo O'Higgins
División de Ascenso (AAS)
4	1946	Fortín Mapocho	
5	1947	Ferroviarios	
6	1948	Ferroviarios	
División de Honor Amateur
7	1949	Ferroviarios	Maestranza Central
8	1950	Maestranza Central	Rangers
9	1951	Thomas Bata	Maestranza Central
10	1952	Walter Müller	Minas Melón
11	1953	Minas Melón	Viña del Mar
Defunct Tournament (See: Segunda División)
