= Deportes Tocopilla =

Chilean football club

- Full name: Club de Deportes Tocopilla
- Nicknames: Furia Roja, Camellos
- Founded: March 27, 2006
- Ground: Ascanio Cortés Torres Municipal Stadium; Tocopilla, Chile
- Capacity: 5,000
- Chairman: Luis Donoso
- Manager: Clemente Meneses
- League: Origin Association
Home colours

Club de Deportes Tocopilla is a Chilean Football club based in Tocopilla, Antofagasta Region. Their home ground is Ascanio Cortés Torres Municipal Stadium.

The club were founded on March 27, 2006 and participated for 3 years in Chilean Tercera División, 1 year in Chilean Cuarta División and 3 seasons in Torneo Afunor.

== Seasons played ==
- 3 seasons in Tercera División
- 1 season in Cuarta División
- 3 seasons in Torneo Afunor

== See also ==
- Chilean football league system
