= Instituto O'Higgins de Rancagua =

O'Higgins Institute
- Instituto O'Higgins
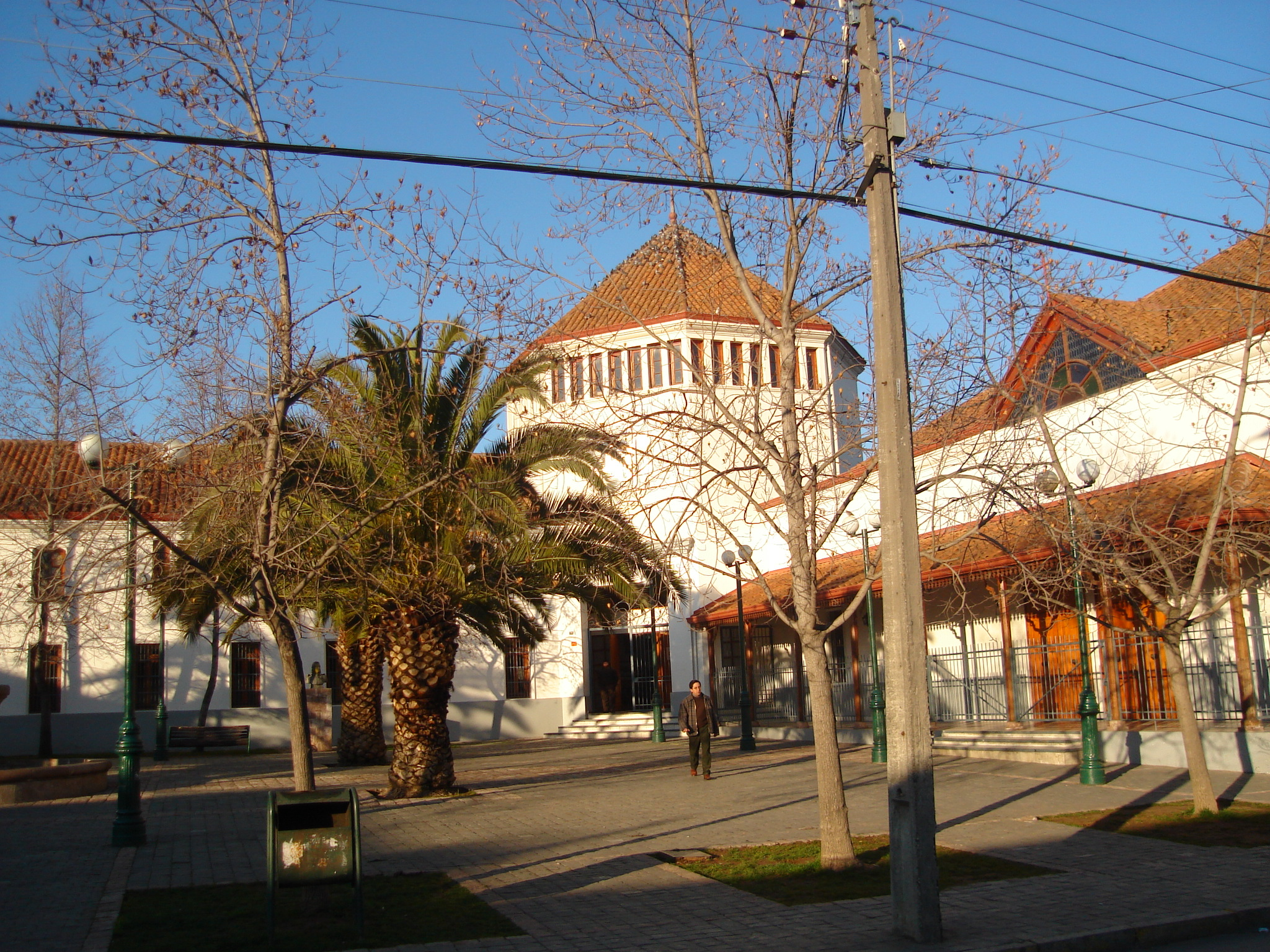
- Instituto O'Higgins main entrance

Location
- Estado No. 719; O'Higgins Region; Rancagua; Chile
- 34.1742°S 70.7420°W

Information
- Motto: Formar buenos cristianos y honrados ciudadanos (To form good christians and honest citizens)
- Religious affiliation: Catholic
- Founded: 9 February 1915; 111 years ago
- Founder: Andrés, Donato, Cristóbal y Salvador María Brothers
- Authority: Marist Brothers
- Rector: Manuel Llanos Galaz
- Age range: 4–18
- Enrollment: Over 2.000
- Language: Spanish
- Colours: Green, white
- Athletics: Football, basketball, volleyball, athletics.
- Mascot: Loro (parrot)
- National ranking: 30º (1996–2006)
- Yearbook: Anuario Alborada
- Graduates (2014): 150
- Affiliation: FIDE
- Website: www.iomaristas.cl

Instituto O'Higgins is a private Catholic school located in the center of Rancagua, Chile. It is administered by the Marist Brothers.

It was founded in 1915 by four Marist Brothers, Andrés, Donato, Cristobal and Salvador María. Originally the institute was exclusively for boys, but since year 2000, girls have been allowed as well.

In 1925 the school created his own football team, the Club de Deportes Instituto O'Higgins, that was merged in 1954 with the Braden Copper Company team, creating the O'Higgins Braden club. One year later, in 1955, O'Higgins Braden merged with América de Rancagua football club, forming the current Club Deportivo O'Higgins.

This school has a sports park called Estadio Marista (Marist Stadium), located in the town of Machalí, near Rancagua.

== Rectors ==
The rectors of the school had been:

- Brother María Lucio (1915)
- Brother Donato (1915–1925)
- Brother Lucinio María (1925–1930)
- Brother Artuzo Izco (1931–1933)
- Brother Elías José (1933–1938)
- Brother Ignacio Gabriel (1939–1944)
- Brother Lucinio María (1945–1946)
- Brother Pablo Timoteo (1947–1950)
- Brother "Belarmino" José Elizagaray Echarte (1950–1956)
- Brother Herminio Goñi (1956–1959)
- Brother Carlos Hidalgo (1959–1962)
- Brother Gaudencio Pando (1962–1964)
- Brother Eduardo Fernández Santos (1964–1969)
- Brother Santiago Rosa Urquiza (1969–1974)
- Brother Juan Sabas Cebrián González (1975–1978)
- Brother Feliciano Ortega Ortega (1979–1983)
- Brother Juan Sabas Cebrián González (1984–1986)
- Brother Jesús Triguero Juanes (1987–1992)
- Brother Jesús Pérez Valdajos (1993–1996)
- Brother Aldo Passalacqua Restini (1997–2002)
- Brother Jesús Triguero Juanes (2003–2008)
- Brother Aldo Passalacqua Restini (2009–2011)
- Pedro Díaz Cuevas (2012–2018), first secular rector.
- Claudio Castillo Faúndez (2019-2021)
- Manuel Antonio Llanos Galaz (2022-)

== See also ==
- List of Marist Brothers schools
