= Club Deportivo Ferroviarios =

Chilean football club

Ferroviarios
- Full name: Club Deportivo Ferroviarios de Chile
- Nicknames: Ferro (Rail); Locomotora (Locomotive)
- Founded: July 14, 1916
- Ground: Estadio Los Nogales, Estacion Central, Santiago
- Capacity: 2800
- Chairman: Luis Tapia
- Manager: Rodrigo Bendeck
- League: Tercera B
- 2024: 10th (Center zone)
Home colours	Away colours

Club Deportivo Ferroviarios de Chile is a Chilean Football club based in Estacion Central, Santiago. They currently play at the fifth level of Chilean football, the Tercera B.

== History ==
The club was founded on July 14, 1916, by railroad workers in the Barrio San Eugenio; and on February 23, 1950, when they merged with Santiago Badminton, until 1969 they were known as Ferrobadminton. Badminton then decided to undo the merger and moved to Curicó.

In 1980, the club moved to Talagante and adopted the name of Talagante-Ferro. In 1982 was renamed as Ferroviarios.

== Honours ==
- División de Honor Amateur: 3
  - 1947, 1948, 1949
- Cuarta División: 1
  - 2003

- 1 season in Primera División
- 14 seasons in Primera B
- 12 seasons in Tercera División
- 17 seasons in Cuarta División

== Records ==
- Record Primera División victory — 7–1 v. Morning Star (1934)
- Record Primera División defeat — 0–6 v. Colo-Colo (1934)
- Primera División Best Position — 9th (1934)
