= O'Higgins Braden =

Chilean football club

- Full name: Club O'Higgins Braden
- Nickname: Braden
- Founded: 1954
- Dissolved: 1955 (became O'Higgins)
- Ground: Estadio Braden Cooper Co., Rancagua, Chile
- Capacity: 14,450
- Owner: Braden Copper Company
- Final season; 1954: 1st (Promoted to Primera División)
Home colours

O'Higgins Braden was a Chilean football club based in the city of Rancagua. The club was founded on 1954 and merged between Instituto O'Higgins and Braden F.C..

Later, after won the Segunda División, the club merged in 1955 with América de Rancagua forming the current club O'Higgins.

== History ==
In 1954, Instituto O'Higgins, competing in the Segunda División, decided to merge with the football team of the Braden Copper Company and together they founded the O'Higgins Braden.

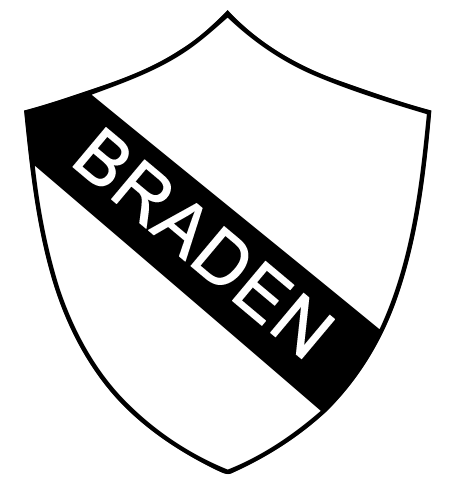
Braden F.C. logo, later the club will be combined with Instituto O'Higgins forming O'Higgins Braden.

Thus, despite its short existence, the club participated in the Second Division championship in 1954 and played every inch of the top of the standings with América, also from Rancagua and archrival Instituto O'Higgins. Finally, with the help of his coach es:Francisco Hormazábal, O'Higgins Braden titled tournament undefeated after winning 12 games and drawing 6, while América de Rancagua, led by Salvador Nocetti, was runner-up of the tournament.

Both teams won the right to play in the division of honor. However, the Asociación Central de Fútbol and its policy of "a city club" forced to merge both clubs to represent the city of Rancagua. This generated an intense debate in the summer of 1955, as yellow and white-green rejected such an imposition, and even argued that América had no problems to continue in the second division .

However, given the possibility of disaffiliation of both clubs and the loss of quota for the city, the April 7th of 1955, O'Higgins Braden is forced to join América de Rancagua, giving rise to O'Higgins. Its first president after navigate a coin in the air, was Francisco Rajcevich (O'Higgins Braden) and his vice president, Manuel Riquelme (América), as equal to members of America and O'Higgins Braden in the directory after successive ties, Carlos Dittborn, leader of the Asociación Central de Fútbol decided that the coin was the only way to solve the issue of the president.

== 1954 Champions squad ==

1954 O'Higgins Braden Champions squad.
- (Chile) Luis Valenzuela (GK)
- (Chile) Raúl Salazar (DF)
- (Chile) Naín Demetrio Rostión (DF)
- (Chile) Milton Puga (MF)
- (Chile) Juan Bautista Soto (DF)
- (Chile) Mario De Luca (MF)
- (Chile) Jorge Peñaloza (FW)
- (Chile) Juvenal Soto (FW)
- (Chile) Mario González (DF)
- (Chile) Sergio Fuenzalida (FW)
- (Chile) René Valdenegro (FW)
- (Chile) Ernesto Soto (GK)
- (Chile) Francisco Hormazábal (manager)
- (Chile) Eduardo Muñoz Muñoz (fitness coach)

== National honors ==
- Segunda División: 1

1954

== Stadium ==
The Stadium of O'Higgins Braden was the World Cup Stadium Estadio El Teniente. The stadium is a multi-purpose stadium in Rancagua, Chile. It is currently used mostly for football matches. The stadium holds 14,450 people and was built in 1945. The stadium hosted several matches of the FIFA World Cup in 1962.
