= Deportivo Thomas Bata =

Chilean sports club

The Club Deportivo Thomas Bata is a Chilean amateur sports club based in Peñaflor. It was founded in 1940 by employees of the local Bata Shoes factory, and its name is a tribute to Tomáš Baťa, the company's founder.

The club had many sport branches, being the most famous the basketball branch. Today only the amateur football and the Roller hockey branches are still active.

== Association football ==
Thomas Bata
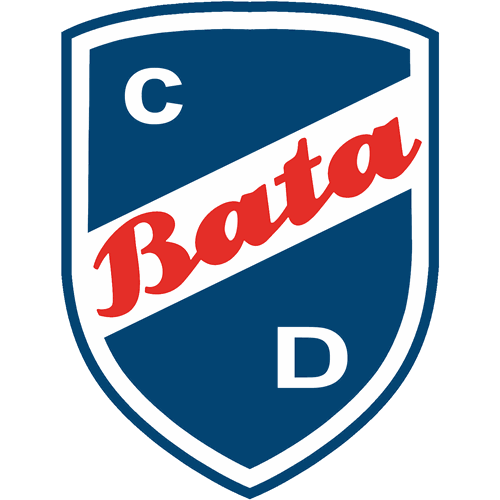
- Full name: Club Deportivo Thomas Bata
- Nickname: Bata
- Founded: September 18, 1940
- League: Tercera Division
- 1989: 4th
Home colours

In 1953, the team won the Segunda Division league, but the club could not be promoted to top level because the company decided to withdraw its financial support.

Currently, Thomas Bata only plays in its local amateur league.

=== National honours ===
- Segunda División: 1

1953

- Cuarta División: 1

1988

==== Minor titles ====
- Regional Zona Central: 12

1956, 1957, 1958, 1959, 1962, 1963, 1965, 1966, 1967, 1970, 1977, 1978

== Basketball ==
Thomas Bata's basketball was a successful team; being the only Chilean team to have won the South American Club tournament, (back in 1967).

In 1979 the team joins the Chilean professional league being its first champion (1979), participating until 1986, when they retired.

=== National honours ===
- División Mayor del Básquetbol de Chile: 1

1979

- Torneos de Clubes Campeones de Chile: 2

1967, 1974

=== International honours ===
- Campeonato Sudamericano de Clubes: 1

1967
