= América de Rancagua =

Chilean football club

América
- Full name: Club de Deportes América de Rancagua
- Nicknames: El Cóndor (The Condor); Aurinegro (Black and Yellow)
- Founded: January 1, 1916
- Dissolved: 1955 (became O'Higgins)
- Ground: Cancha Alameda, Rancagua, Chile
- Capacity: 1,000
- Final season (1954): 2nd (Promoted to Primera División)
Home colours

América de Rancagua was a Chilean football club based in the city of Rancagua. The club was founded on 1916 and dissolved on 1955, when it merged with O'Higgins Braden forming the current club O'Higgins.

== History ==
América de Rancagua, led by Salvador Nocetti, was runner-up of the 1954 tournament, and O'Higgins Braden won the tournament undefeated.

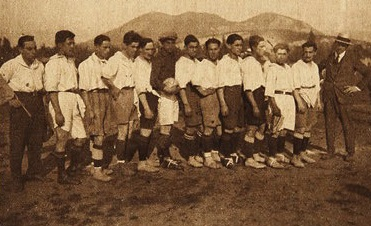
América's team in 1923.

Both teams won the right to play in the division of honor. However, the Asociación Central de Fútbol and its policy of "a city club" forced to merge both clubs to represent the city of Rancagua. This generated an intense debate in the summer of 1955, as yellow and white-green rejected such an imposition, and even argued that América had no problems to continue in the second division.

However, given the possibility of disaffiliation of both clubs and the loss of quota for the city, the April 7th of 1955, O'Higgins Braden is forced to join América de Rancagua, giving rise to O'Higgins. Its first president after navigate a coin in the air, was Francisco Rajcevich (O'Higgins Braden) and his vice president, Manuel Riquelme (América), as equal to members of America and O'Higgins Braden in the directory after successive ties, Carlos Dittborn, leader of the Asociación Central de Fútbol decided that the coin was the only way to solve the issue of the president.

== Honours ==
=== Domestic Competitions ===
- Primera B de Chile
  - Runners-up (2): 1953, 1954
- Liga O'Higgins
  - Winners (1): 1923
