= Club Deportivo Universidad Técnica del Estado =

Defunct Chilean association football club

Club Deportivo Universidad Técnica del Estado was a Chilean association football club linked to the Technical University of the State of Chile (current University of Santiago, Chile).

It was founded on 1948 and disappeared in 1969.

== Club facts ==
- Record Segunda División victory — 6–0 v. Santiago National (1955), 6–0 v. Trasandino (1969)
- Record Segunda División defeat — 0–7 v. San Luis de Quillota (1958)
- Segunda División Best Position — 4th (1962)
- Segunda División Worst Position — 12th (1965)
