= Club de Deportes Green Cross =

Chilean football club

Green Cross
- Full name: Club de Deportes Green Cross
- Nickname: Los pijes
- Founded: 27 June 1916
- Dissolved: 20 March 1965 (48 years)
- Ground: Estadio Nacional, Santiago
- Capacity: 70,000
- League: Primera División
Home colours	Away colours

Green Cross was a Chilean sports club that was based in the city of Santiago until 1965, when it moved to Temuco.

== History ==
The club was founded on 27 June 1916, and its first chairman was Francisco Tapia. It was one of the eight teams that founded the professional Chilean football league in 1933.

The club had other sports branches besides football; these were basketball, cycling, and water polo.

The club won its first and only Chilean league title in 1945.

In April 1961 a number of players were killed in a plane crash in the Chilean Andes. The remains of the plane were found ten days after the accident. The wreckage was rediscovered in February 2015 by a climbing party.

In 1965 the club moved to Temuco where it merged with the local football team Deportes Temuco. Known for the first two decades as Green Cross Temuco, in 1985 the club reverted to the name Deportes Temuco.

== Honours ==
=== National ===
- Chilean Primera División
  - Winners (1): 1945
- Primera B de Chile
  - Winners (2): 1960, 1963

=== Regional ===
- Honour Division of Liga Metropolitana de Deportes
  - Winners (2): 1917, 1918

=== Friendly ===
- Nino Brusadelli Cup (1): 1928

== Records and data ==
- Seasons in Primera División: 25 (1933–1934; 1939–1958; 1961–1962; 1964).
- Seasons in Segunda División: 3 (1959–1960; 1963).
- Bigger victory achieved:
  - In Primera División: 6–1 against Santiago National on 23 August 1942 and 6 October 1946; against O'Higgins on 11 June 1955.
- Bigger defeat received:.
  - In Primera División: 1–10 against Unión Española on 8 July 1934.
- Best position in Primera División: 1º (1945)
- Worst position in Primera División: 18º (1962)
- Best scorer: Juan Morcillo (75 goals)

== Notes ==
23 OP´JKMHPJUG
