= Bádminton F.C. =

Chilean football club

Badminton
- Full name: Badminton Football Club
- Nickname: Rodillo Aurinegro
- Founded: 1912
- Dissolved: 1973
- Ground: Estadio La Granja
- Capacity: 4,000
- League: Segunda División
- 1971: 14th
Home colours	Away colours

Badminton Football Club is a former Chilean football club based in the city of Santiago, until 1969, when they moved to Curicó. The club was founded 12 July 1912 and it was one of the eight teams that founded the first division professional of the Chilean football league, in 1933.

Since 1950, the club adopted the name of Ferrobadminton, when it merged with another Santiago team, Ferroviarios, until 1969, when both teams took separate paths again.

In 1969 they moved to Curicó, and since then, they were known as Badminton de Curicó, until 1973 when the club folded.

== Uniform ==
The club wore yellow and black jerseys. Initially, the stripes were horizontal, but they were later changed to vertical.

== Honors ==
- Segunda Division: 1965
