= Santiago National F.C. =

Santiago National
- Full name: Santiago National Football Club
- Nickname: Listados
- Founded: April 10, 1900
- Chairman: (Chile) J. Alberto Sánchez, (first)
- League: Segunda División
- 1954: 9th
Home colours	Away colours

Santiago National, is an extinct Chilean football club based in the city of Santiago. The club was founded in 1900, and it was one of the 8 teams that founded the professional first division of the Chilean football league, in 1933.

Since 1940 until the beginning of 1942 it was known as Santiago National Juventus.

== National honors ==
- Copa Apertura: 1

1942

- Serie B: 1

1935
