= Liga de Primera =

Professional association football league in Chile

- Organising body: Asociación Nacional de Fútbol Profesional (ANFP)
- Founded: 31 May 1933; 93 years ago
- Country: Chile
- Confederation: CONMEBOL
- Number of clubs: 16
- Level on pyramid: 1
- Relegation to: Primera B
- Domestic cup(s): Copa Chile; Copa de la Liga
- International cup(s): Copa Libertadores; Copa Sudamericana
- Current champions: Colo-Colo (35th title) (2026)
- Most championships: Colo-Colo (35 titles)
- Most appearances: Adolfo Nef (624)
- Top scorer: Esteban Paredes (221)
- Broadcasters: Chile; TNT Sports; International; Broadcasters
- Website: Liga de Primera Itaú
- Current: 2026 Liga de Primera

The Liga de Primera or Campeonato Nacional de la Primera División del Fútbol Profesional Chileno (English: "National Championship of the First Division of Chilean Professional Football") is a professional association football league in Chile and the highest level of the Chilean football league system. Founded in 1933, it is organized by the Asociación Nacional de Fútbol Profesional (ANFP). The league is officially known as the Liga de Primera Mercado Libre due to sponsorship by the e-commerce company Mercado Libre.

Throughout its history, the national championship has had different formats, structures and number of participants. The 2025 season is being contested through a single tournament throughout the calendar year. A total of 16 teams participate in the competition and it works with a system of promotion and relegation with the lower category, the Primera B (category with which it shares the Copa Chile).

A total of 53 clubs have played at least one season in the first division, and 16 have won the title at least once. Its first champion was Deportes Magallanes. Colo-Colo has been the only team to participate in every first division season, as holds the most titles won with 34, followed by Universidad de Chile with 18, Universidad Católica with 16 and Cobreloa with 8, the most titles held by any team outside the capital.

== History ==
=== Amateurism ===
The Asociación de Fútbol de Santiago (also known as AFS) was the first organization in Chile to formally organize a football tournament. It was formed in 1903 and organized non-professional football in Santiago. Thereafter, it was the organization responsible for running the national professional football league in Chile.

=== Professionalism ===
In 1933, eight big clubs at that time, namely, Unión Española, Badminton, Colo-Colo, Audax Italiano, Green Cross, Morning Star, Magallanes and Santiago National F.C., founded the Liga Profesional de Football de Santiago (LPF) on 31 May 1933. The newly formed body was recognised by the Football Federation of Chile on 2 June 1933.

The first edition of professional competition was contested by the eight founding teams and was won by Magallanes after defeating Colo-Colo in a decisive match. In the following year, according to the disposition of Federación de Fútbol de Chile, Liga Profesional returned to integrate with the AFS. As part of the negotiations for reunification, four teams from AFS, namely, Ferroviarios, Carlos Walker, Deportivo Alemán, and Santiago F.C., would join the 1934 professional competition. Moreover, it was also decided that the last six teams in the 1934 competition would be eliminated to form the new second division in 1935. The title of the expanded 1934 edition was again clinched by Magallanes, which won 10 out of the 11 matches that year.

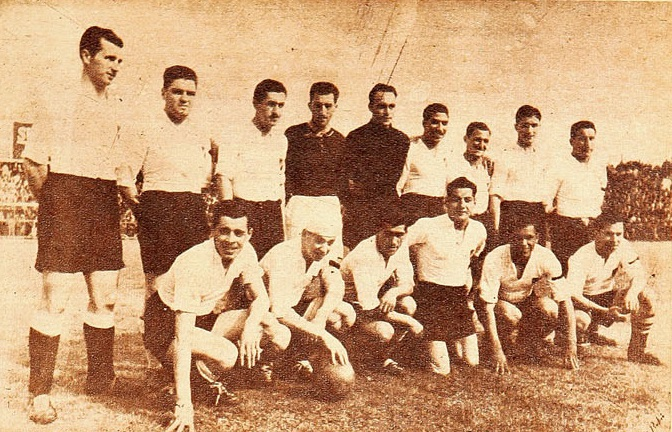
Colo-Colo 1937 squad

In 1937, the Santiago Professional Football Association was founded - it would be renamed the Central Football Association (ACF), becoming the first association to operate independently of the amateur sector. The 1937 championship was the debut season for Santiago Wanderers, the first team to compete from outside the capital, however, it had to play all its matches in Santiago and as a guest, which meant that no points were credited to it in the standings. The tournament was finally won by Colo-Colo, who under its number one star went undefeated.

In the 1940 championship, the traditional two-wheel system was restored and Universidad de Chile had a great squad under the leadership of Luis Tirado and with players such as Víctor Alonso, the tournament's top scorer with 20 goals, Abanés Passalacqua and goalkeeper Eduardo Simián, and was crowned professional champions for the first time after only three years in the top division.

In 1947, Colo Colo got their fifth star under the guidance of their coach Enrique Sorrel and who was awarded the title of host of the South American Championship of Champions (a tournament in which the champion clubs of the official leagues of the South American continent participated). In the 1948 tournament, historic Italian players such as goalkeeper Daniel Chirinos, defender Carlos Varela and strikers Juan Zárate and Domingo Romo once again led Audax Italiano to its third professional title.

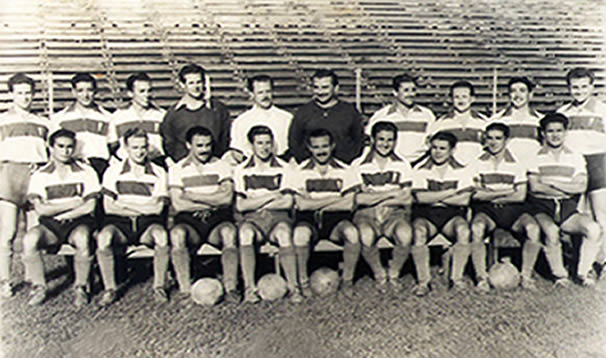
Universidad Católica 1949.

In 1949, Universidad Católica won its first league title, featuring figures such as Chilean national team member Sergio Livingstone, Andrés Prieto, Raimundo Infante, Fernando Riera and Argentine soccer star José Manuel Moreno. In the decisive match, Católica defeated Audax Italiano 2-1 with a strong performance from Infante. Months earlier, the team had won the Torneo de Consuelo, defeating Bádminton F.C. 3-2.

In the 1950 championship, Everton de Viña del Mar was crowned champion for the first time in its history and in the process broke the capital's hegemony, becoming the first provincial champion after defeating Unión Española in the final match with a solitary goal from its leading striker, René Meléndez. In addition, one of the founding clubs of the First Division, Badminton, merged with Ferroviarios to form Ferrobádminton.

In 1960, Colo-Colo won its eighth title, beating Santiago Wanderers by 6 points and its arch rival, Universidad de Chile, by 9 points. That tournament also marked the beginning of the crisis for Magallanes, when it was relegated for the first time in its history. The Carabelero team were relegated due to the average standings of the preceding three years.

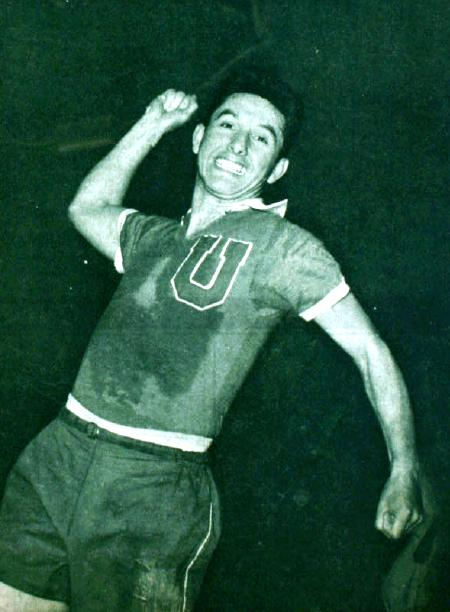
Leonel Sánchez, idol of Club Universidad de Chile

In the 1961 tournament, Universidad de Chile and Universidad Católica tied in points and forced two final matches in which, after a draw in the first leg, the Cruzados team won the return leg by 3-2, with a penalty kick by Alberto Fouillioux at 85 minutes, a score that led it to obtain its third national title. That year, Audax Italiano made a big splash in the transfer market, by bringing in Brazilian national team player and World Cup player Zizinho, who scored only 3 goals in 16 games, and also his compatriot Ceninho, who scored only 8 goals (5 more than Zizinho).

In 1962, Universidad de Chile, who provided the most players to the Chilean national team in the World Cup held in Chile, won the final match of that year's championship against Universidad Católica, semifinalist of the 1962 Copa Libertadores, tieing Católica with three titles up to that point. Thus, Chilean football was marked in that decade by the Clásico Universitario.

The arrival of the 1970s saw Colo-Colo, in the national championship, obtain its tenth star after seven years, by beating Unión Española in a close final, counting on great figures such as Francisco Valdés, Carlos Caszely, Leonel Sánchez (who arrived as a reinforcement for Colo-Colo that year), Humberto Cruz, Juan Carlos Gangas, Víctor Zelada, the Uruguayan José María Piriz and the Brazilian Elson Beyruth.

In 1971, the tournament returned to the round-robin system, with the Unión San Felipe team, coached by Luis Santibáñez, winning the championship. After beating Universidad de Chile in the final stretch, it lifted its first and only title, holding to this day the record of being the only team to win consecutive Second Division and First Division tournaments, respectively.

The 1972 national tournament, with a total attendance of over 3,000,000, holds the record of the season with the largest cumulative attendance in the history of Chilean football. In this tournament, Colo-Colo won its eleventh title relegating Unión Española to second place by three points in the table, using almost the same squad that was champion in 1970, but with the technical figure of Luis Álamos, who currently holds the record of the technical director with the most First Division titles. That year was also marked by Everton's relegation, finishing last in that tournament and the return of Palestino, who won the Second Division title and returned to the top flight after a two year absence.

=== Present ===
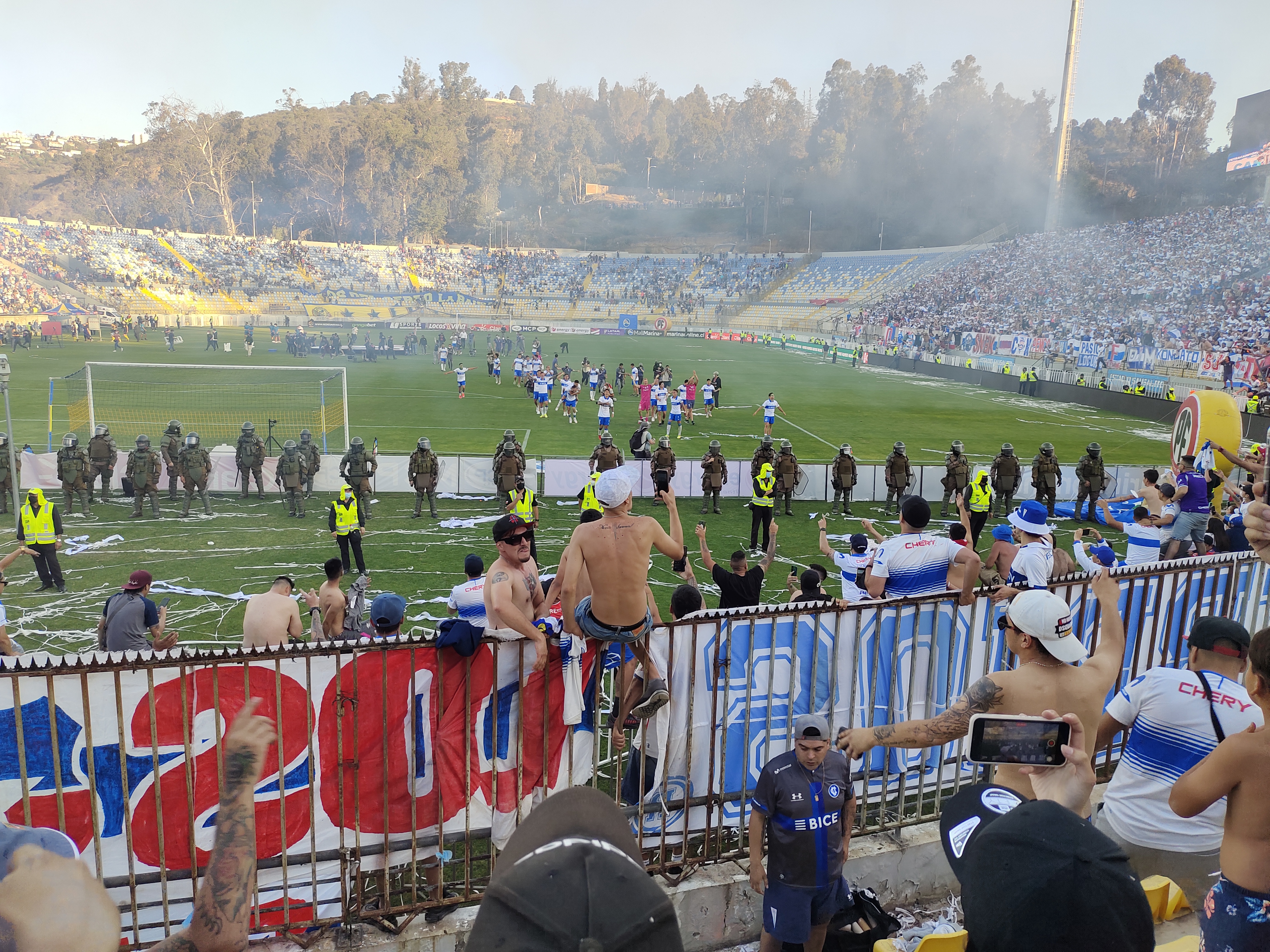
Universidad Católica fans celebrating their third title in 2021

On 10 February 2021, with the 2020 season postponed due to the COVID-19 pandemic, Universidad Católica won the first three-time championship in its history, obtaining the fifteenth title, and the fifth of the last seven championships in Chile. Near the bottom of the table, Colo-Colo required a playoff to stay in the top flight for the first time in its history, which it managed to overcome beating Universidad de Concepción 1-0, with a goal from Argentine Pablo Solari, in a match that was played on 17 February 2021 at the Estadio Fiscal de Talca.

The 2024 tournament is considered by fans and analysts as the best ever seasons of the long tournament format after a fierce fight between Colo Colo and Universidad de Chile (the first between the two since 1998) putting them almost 20 points ahead of the third place, which was the surprising Deportes Iquique.

== Division levels ==
Year	Level	Relegation to
1933–1934	1	(None)
1935–1942	1	Serie B Profesional
1943–1951	1	División de Honor Amateur
1952–1995	1	Segunda División
1996–present	1	Primera B

== Format ==
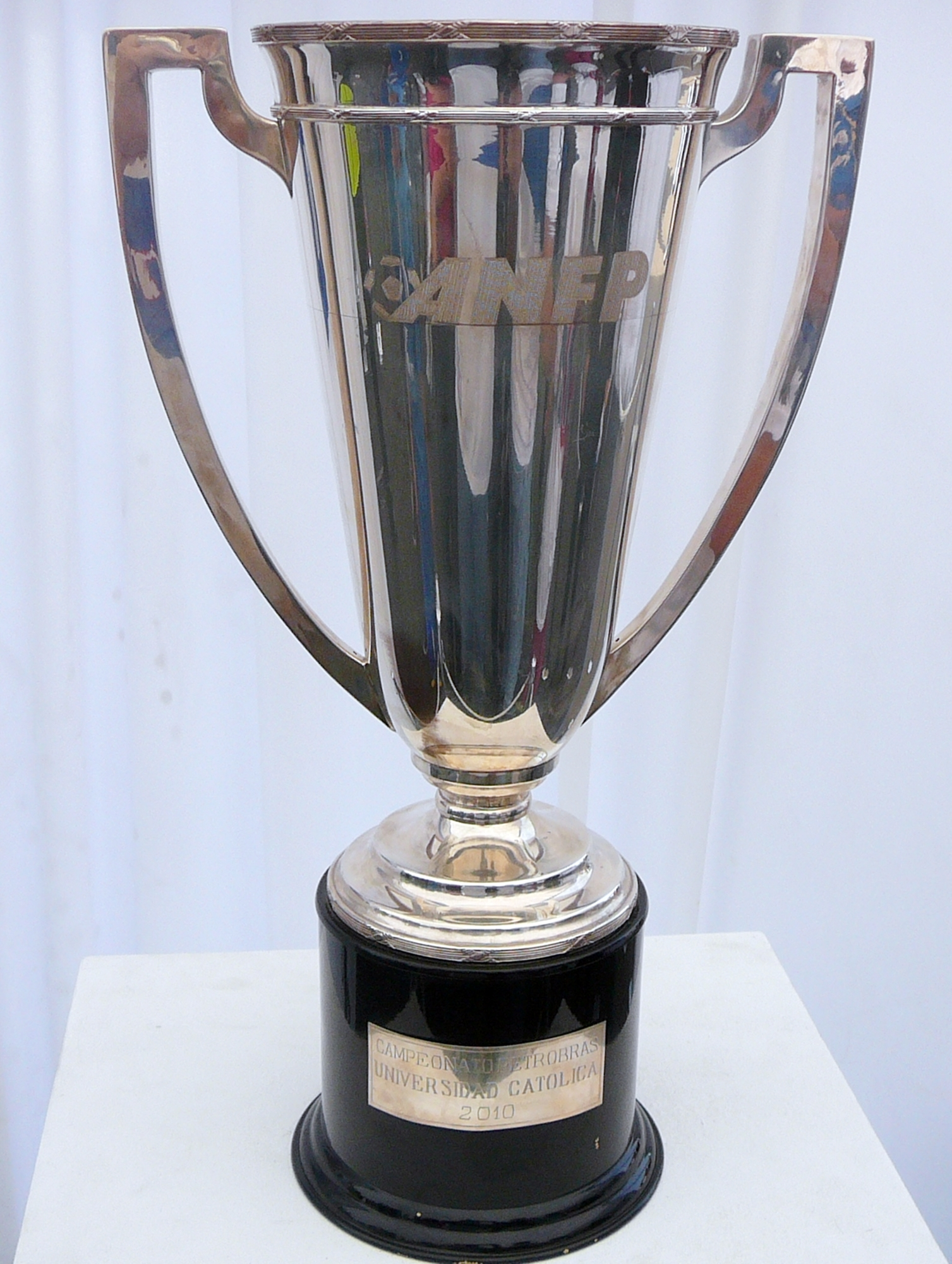
Huemul de Plata trophy.

The current format has been in place since 2018 with 16 teams competing in the league, playing against each other twice, once at home and once away. The team that places first at the end of the season are crowned champions, while the bottom two teams are relegated.

=== Relegation and promotion ===
Currently, the two teams that place bottom in the season, are relegated to Primera B de Chile, and replaced by the champions and the playoff winners of the second division.

=== Qualification for international competitions ===
Chile is given 8 total berths to CONMEBOL competitions, 4 for Copa Libertadores and 4 for Copa Sudamericana. The league champions qualify for the following year's Copa Libertadores, as well as the runners-up and the third-placed team. The fourth berth is given to the champions of the Copa Chile. The teams placing fourth, fifth, sixth and seventh qualify for the following year's Copa Sudamericana.

== Sponsorships ==
Year	Sponsor
1933–1992	(None)
1993–2009	(Chile) Banco Estado
2010–2013	(Brazil) Petrobras
2014–2018	(Canada) Scotiabank
2019–2022	(Chile) AFP PlanVital
2023	(Sweden) Betsson
2024–2025	(Brazil) Itaú
2026–present	(Argentina) Mercado Libre

== Rivalries ==
- Colo-Colo – Universidad de Chile (National derby)
- Universidad de Chile – Universidad Católica (Universitario derby)
- Colo-Colo – Universidad Católica (Albo-Cruzado derby)
- Colo-Colo – Cobreloa (Loíno-Albo derby)
- Santiago Wanderers – Everton (Porteño derby)
- Unión Española – Audax Italiano – Palestino (Colonias derby)
- Deportes Iquique – San Marcos de Arica (Northern derby)
- Cobreloa – Cobresal (Cobre derby)
- Rangers – Curicó Unido (Maule derby)

== Current teams ==
Locations of the 2026 Liga de Primera teams.
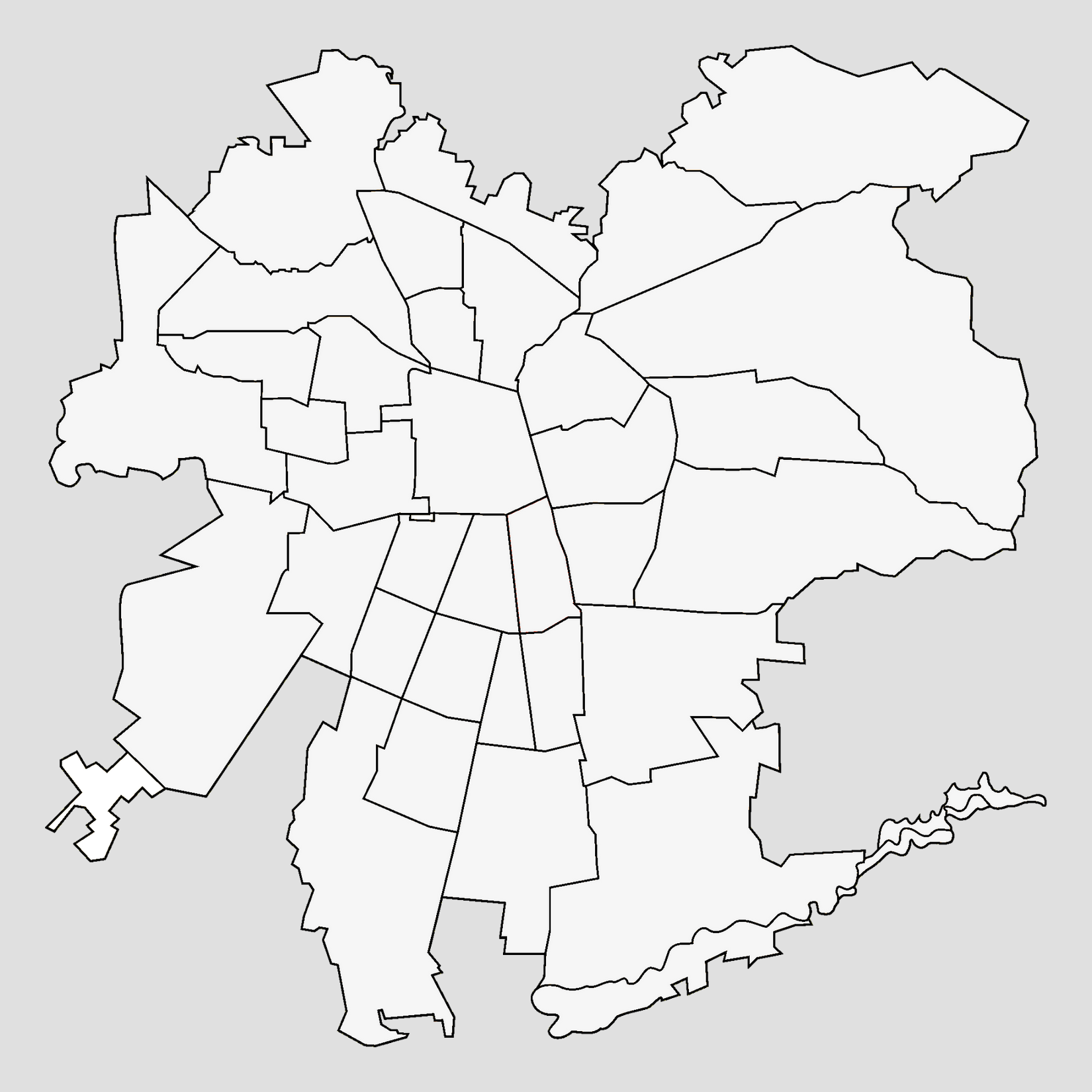
Locations of the 2026 Liga de Primera teams – Santiago.

A total of 54 teams (considering mergers and name changes) have participated throughout the 94 seasons of the Primera División, of which 16 have won the championship.

Colo-Colo is the only team to have played all 94 seasons of Chilean football in the Primera División. In second place is Unión Española, which did not play in 1939 due to the Spanish Civil War, and played in Primera B between 1998 and 1999.

Sixteen teams will take part in the league for the 2026 season.

=== Stadia and locations ===
Team	City	Stadium	Capacity
Audax Italiano	Santiago (La Florida)	Bicentenario de La Florida	11,637
Cobresal	El Salvador	El Cobre	11,240
Colo-Colo	Santiago (Macul)	Monumental David Arellano	43,667
Coquimbo Unido	Coquimbo	Francisco Sánchez Rumoroso	15,809
Deportes Concepción	Concepción	Ester Roa Rebolledo	30,448
Deportes La Serena	La Serena	La Portada	17,134
Deportes Limache	Limache	Nicolás Chahuán Nazar (Note: Deportes Limache play their home matches at Nicolás Chahuán Nazar Municipal Stadium in La Calera since their regular stadium Estadio Gustavo Ocaranza in Limache does not meet ANFP requirements.)	8,353
Everton	Viña del Mar	Sausalito	21,754
Huachipato	Talcahuano	Huachipato-CAP Acero	10,032
Ñublense	Chillán	Nelson Oyarzún Arenas	11,319
O'Higgins	Rancagua	El Teniente	12,476
Palestino	Santiago (La Cisterna)	Municipal de La Cisterna	8,000
Unión La Calera	La Calera	Nicolás Chahuán Nazar	8,353
Universidad Católica	Santiago (Las Condes)	Claro Arena	20,249
Universidad de Chile	Santiago (Ñuñoa)	Nacional Julio Martínez Prádanos	46,190
Universidad de Concepción	Concepción	Ester Roa Rebolledo	30,448

== Season in Primera División ==
=== Most seasons ===
Below is the list of clubs that have appeared in Primera División since its inception in 1933 until the 2025 season. The teams in bold currently compete in Primera División. The year in parentheses represents a club's most recent year of participation at this level.

- **94** seasons: **Colo-Colo** (2025)
- **91** seasons: **Unión Española** (2025)
- **88** seasons: **Universidad de Chile** (2025)
- **85** seasons: **Universidad Católica** (2025)
- **80** seasons: **Audax Italiano** (2025)
- **71** seasons: **Palestino** (2025)
- **69** seasons: **Everton** (2025)
- **62** seasons: **O'Higgins** (2025), Santiago Wanderers (2021)
- **52** seasons: **Huachipato** (2025)
- **50** seasons: Magallanes (2023)
- **46** seasons: Santiago Morning (2011), Rangers (2014)
- **44** seasons: **Deportes La Serena** (2025)
- **39** seasons: Cobreloa (2024)
- **34** seasons: **Cobresal** (2024), Deportes Concepción (2008)
- **33** seasons: Deportes Antofagasta (2022)
- **32** seasons: Deportes Temuco (2018)
- **30** seasons: **Coquimbo Unido** (2025)
- **28** seasons: **Unión La Calera** (2025)
- **27** seasons: **Deportes Iquique** (2025)
- **25** seasons: Green Cross (1964)
- **24** seasons: Unión San Felipe (2012)
- **21** seasons: San Luis (2018)
- **18** seasons: Universidad de Concepción (2020)
- **17** seasons: **Ñublense** (2025), Bádminton (1949), Ferrobádminton (1966)
- **16** seasons: Naval (1990)
- **13** seasons: Lota Schwager (2013)
- **10** seasons: Deportes Puerto Montt (2007), Santiago National (1948)
- **9** seasons: Iberia (1954), Fernández Vial (1992), Provincial Osorno (2008)
- **8** seasons: Curicó Unido (2023)
- **7** seasons: Deportes Aviación (1980), San Marcos de Arica (2016)
- **6** seasons: Regional Atacama (1996)
- **5** seasons: Deportes Melipilla (2021)
- **2** seasons: Deportes Valdivia (1989), Deportes Copiapó (2024), Deportes Ovalle (1977), Morning Star (1934), Santiago (1935), Santiago National Juventus (1941), Trasandino (1984)
- **1** season: Carlos Walker (1934), Ferroviarios (1934), Deportivo Alemán (1934), Metropolitano (1939), Barnechea (2015), **Deportes Limache** (2025)

== List of champions ==
- (In bracket, title count):

Ed.	Season		Champion (title count)	Runner-up	Winning manager	Leading goalscorer(s)
División de Honor
1	1933		Magallanes (1)	Colo-Colo	(Chile) Arturo Torres	(Chile) Luis Carvallo (Colo-Colo; 9 goals)
2	1934		Magallanes (2)	Audax Italiano	(Chile) Arturo Torres	(Chile) Carlos Giudice (Audax Italiano; 19 goals)
Serie A Profesional
3	1935		Magallanes (3)	Audax Italiano	(Chile) Arturo Torres	(Chile) Aurelio Domínguez (Colo-Colo; 12 goals) (Chile) Guillermo Ogaz (Magallanes; 12 goals)
4	1936		Audax Italiano (1)	Magallanes	(Chile) Carlos Giudice	(Costa Rica) Hernán Bolaños (Audax Italiano; 14 goals)
5	1937		Colo-Colo (1)	Magallanes	(Chile) Arturo Torres	(Costa Rica) Hernán Bolaños (Audax Italiano; 16 goals)
6	1938		Magallanes (4)	Audax Italiano	(Chile) Leoncio Veloso	(Chile) Gustavo Pizarro (Bádminton; 17 goals)
7	1939		Colo-Colo (2)	Santiago Morning	(Hungary) Ferenc Plattkó	(Chile) Alfonso Domínguez (Colo-Colo; 32 goals)
8	1940		Universidad de Chile (1)	Audax Italiano	(Chile) Luis Tirado	Víctor Alonso (Universidad de Chile; 20 goals); Pedro Valenzuela (Magallanes; 20 goals)
9	1941		Colo-Colo (3)	Santiago Morning	(Hungary) Ferenc Plattkó	(Argentina) José Profetta (Santiago National; 19 goals)
Primera División
10	1942		Santiago Morning (1)	Magallanes	(Argentina) José Luis Boffi	(Chile) Domingo Romo (Santiago Morning; 16 goals)
11	1943		Unión Española (1)	Colo-Colo	(Chile) Atanasio Pardo	(Chile) Luis Machuca (Unión Española; 17 goals) (Chile) Víctor Mancilla Universidad Católica (17 goals)
12	1944		Colo-Colo (4)	Audax Italiano	(Chile) Luis Tirado	(Chile) Juan Alcántara (Audax Italiano; 19 goals) (Chile) Alfonso Domínguez (Colo-Colo; 19 goals)
13	1945		Green Cross (1)	Unión Española	(Chile) Eugenio Soto	(Uruguay) Ubaldo Cruche (Universidad de Chile; 17 goals) (Argentina) Hugo Giorgi (Audax Italiano; 17 goals) (Argentina) Juan Zárate (Green Cross; 17 goals)
14	1946		Audax Italiano (2)	Magallanes	(Chile) Raúl Marchant	(Uruguay) Ubaldo Cruche (Universidad de Chile; 25 goals)
15	1947		Colo-Colo (5)	Audax Italiano	(Chile) Enrique Sorrel	(Chile) Apolonides Vera (Santiago National; 17 goals)
16	1948		Audax Italiano (3)	Unión Española	(Argentina) Salvador Nocetti	(Argentina) Juan Zárate (Audax Italiano; 22 goals)
17	1949		Universidad Católica (1)	Santiago Wanderers	(Chile) Alberto Buccicardi	(Chile) Mario Lorca (Unión Española; 20 goals)
18	1950		Everton (1)	Unión Española	(Argentina) Martín García Díaz	(Argentina) Félix Díaz (Green Cross; 21 goals)
19	1951		Unión Española (2)	Audax Italiano	(Spain) Isidro Lángara	(Chile) Rubén Aguilera (Santiago Morning; 21 goals) (Chile) Carlos Tello (Audax Italiano; 21 goals)
20	1952		Everton (2)	Colo-Colo	(Argentina) Martín García Díaz	(Chile) René Meléndez (Everton; 30 goals)
21	1953		Colo-Colo (6)	Palestino	(Hungary) Ferenc Plattkó	(Chile) Jorge Robledo (Colo-Colo; 26 goals)
22	1954		Universidad Católica (2)	Colo-Colo	(England) William Burnikell	(Chile) Jorge Robledo (Colo-Colo; 25 goals)
23	1955		Palestino (1)	Colo-Colo	(Socialist Federal Republic of Yugoslavia) Miodrag Stefanović	(Argentina) Nicolás Moreno (Green Cross; 27 goals)
24	1956		Colo-Colo (7)	Santiago Wanderers	(Uruguay) Enrique Fernández	(Chile) Guillermo Villarroel (O'Higgins; 19 goals)
25	1957		Audax Italiano (4)	Universidad de Chile	(Hungary) László Pákozdi	(Argentina) Gustavo Albella (Green Cross; 27 goals)
26	1958		Santiago Wanderers (1)	Colo-Colo	(Argentina) José Pérez Figueiras	(Argentina) Gustavo Albella (Green Cross; 23 goals) (Chile) Carlos Verdejo (Deportes La Serena; 23 goals)
27	1959		Universidad de Chile (2)	Colo-Colo	(Chile) Luis Álamos	(Chile) José Benito Ríos (O'Higgins; 22 goals)
28	1960		Colo-Colo (8)	Santiago Wanderers	(Chile) Hernán Carrasco	(Argentina) Juan Falcón (Palestino; 21 goals)
29	1961		Universidad Católica (3)	Universidad de Chile	(Argentina) Miguel Mocciola	Carlos Campos (Universidad de Chile; 24 goals); Honorino Landa (Unión Española; 24 goals)
30	1962		Universidad de Chile (3)	Universidad Católica	(Chile) Luis Álamos	Carlos Campos (Universidad de Chile; 34 goals)
31	1963		Colo-Colo (9)	Universidad de Chile	(Chile) Hugo Tassara	(Chile) Luis Hernán Álvarez (Colo-Colo; 37 goals)
32	1964		Universidad de Chile (4)	Universidad Católica	(Chile) Luis Álamos	(Chile) Daniel Escudero (Everton; 25 goals)
33	1965		Universidad de Chile (5)	Universidad Católica	(Chile) Luis Álamos	(Argentina) Héctor Scandolli (Rangers; 25 goals)
34	1966		Universidad Católica (4)	Colo-Colo	(Chile) Luis Vidal	Carlos Campos (Universidad de Chile; 21 goals) (Argentina) Felipe Bracamonte (Unión San Felipe; 21 goals)
35	1967		Universidad de Chile (6)	Universidad Católica	(Argentina) Alejandro Scopelli	(Paraguay) Eladio Zárate (Unión Española; 28 goals)
36	1968		Santiago Wanderers (2)	Universidad Católica	(Argentina) José Pérez Figueiras	(Chile) Carlos Reinoso (Audax Italiano; 21 goals)
37	1969		Universidad de Chile (7)	Rangers	(Chile) Ulises Ramos	(Paraguay) Eladio Zárate (Unión Española; 22 goals)
38	1970		Colo-Colo (10)	Unión Española	(Chile) Francisco Hormazábal	(Chile) Osvaldo Castro (Deportes Concepción; 36 goals)
39	1971		Unión San Felipe (1)	Universidad de Chile	(Chile) Luis Santibáñez	(Paraguay) Eladio Zárate (Universidad de Chile; 25 goals)
40	1972		Colo-Colo (11)	Unión Española	(Chile) Luis Álamos	(Chile) Fernando Espinosa (Magallanes; 25 goals)
41	1973		Unión Española (3)	Colo-Colo	(Chile) Luis Santibáñez	(Chile) Guillermo Yávar (Unión Española; 21 goals)
42	1974		Huachipato (1)	Palestino	(Chile) Pedro Morales	(Chile) Julio Crisosto (Colo-Colo; 28 goals)
43	1975		Unión Española (4)	Deportes Concepción	(Chile) Luis Santibáñez	(Chile) Victor Pizarro (Santiago Morning; 27 goals)
44	1976		Everton (3)	Unión Española	(Chile) Pedro Morales	(Argentina) (Chile) Óscar Fabbiani (Palestino; 23 goals)
45	1977		Unión Española (5)	Everton	(Chile) Luis Santibáñez	(Argentina) (Chile) Óscar Fabbiani (Palestino; 34 goals)
46	1978		Palestino (2)	Cobreloa	(Chile) Caupolicán Peña	(Argentina) (Chile) Óscar Fabbiani (Palestino; 35 goals)
47	1979		Colo-Colo (12)	Cobreloa	(Chile) Pedro Morales	(Chile) Carlos Caszely (Colo-Colo; 20 goals)
48	1980		Cobreloa (1)	Universidad de Chile	(Argentina) Vicente Cantatore	(Chile) Carlos Caszely (Colo-Colo; 26 goals)
49	1981		Colo-Colo (13)	Cobreloa	(Chile) Pedro García	(Chile) Victor Cabrera (San Luis; 20 goals) (Chile) Carlos Caszely (Colo-Colo; 20 goals) (Chile) Luis Marcoleta (Magallanes; 20 goals)
50	1982		Cobreloa (2)	Colo-Colo	(Argentina) Vicente Cantatore	(Uruguay) Jorge Luis Siviero (Cobreloa; 18 goals)
51	1983		Colo-Colo (14)	Cobreloa	(Chile) Pedro García	(Uruguay) Washington Olivera (Cobreloa; 29 goals)
52	1984		Universidad Católica (5)	Cobresal	(Chile) Ignacio Prieto	(Chile) Victor Cabrera (Regional Atacama; 18 goals)
53	1985		Cobreloa (3)	Everton	(Chile) Jorge Toro	(Chile) Ivo Basay (Magallanes; 19 goals)
54	1986		Colo-Colo (15)	Palestino	(Chile) Arturo Salah	(Chile) Sergio Salgado (Cobresal; 18 goals)
55	1987		Universidad Católica (6)	Colo-Colo	(Chile) Ignacio Prieto	(Chile) Osvaldo Hurtado (Universidad Católica; 21 goals)
56	1988		Cobreloa (4)	Cobresal	(Chile) Miguel Hermosilla	(Argentina) Gustavo De Luca (Deportes La Serena; 18 goals) (Peru) Juan José Oré (Deportes Iquique; 18 goals)
57	1989		Colo-Colo (16)	Universidad Católica	(Chile) Arturo Salah	(Chile) Rubén Martínez (Cobresal; 25 goals)
58	1990		Colo-Colo (17)	Universidad Católica	(Socialist Federal Republic of Yugoslavia) Mirko Jozić	(Chile) Rubén Martínez (Colo-Colo; 22 goals)
59	1991		Colo-Colo (18)	Coquimbo Unido	(Croatia) Mirko Jozić	(Chile) Rubén Martínez (Colo-Colo; 23 goals)
60	1992		Cobreloa (5)	Colo-Colo	(Chile) José Sulantay	(Chile) Aníbal González (Colo-Colo; 24 goals)
61	1993		Colo-Colo (19)	Cobreloa	(Croatia) Mirko Jozić	(Chile) Marco Antonio Figueroa (Cobreloa; 18 goals)
62	1994		Universidad de Chile (8)	Universidad Católica	(Chile) Jorge Socias	(Argentina) Alberto Acosta (Universidad Católica; 33 goals)
63	1995		Universidad de Chile (9)	Universidad Católica	(Chile) Jorge Socias	(Argentina) Gabriel Caballero (Deportes Antofagasta; 18 goals) (Chile) Aníbal González (Palestino; 18 goals)
64	1996		Colo-Colo (20)	Universidad Católica	(Paraguay) Gustavo Benítez	(Chile) Mario Véner (Santiago Wanderers; 30 goals)
65	1997	Apertura	Universidad Católica (7)	Colo-Colo	(Chile) Fernando Carvallo	(Argentina) David Bisconti (Universidad Católica; 15 goals)
66	1997	Clausura	Colo-Colo (21)	Universidad Católica	(Paraguay) Gustavo Benítez	(Paraguay) Richart Báez (Universidad de Chile; 10 goals); Rubén Vallejos (Deportes Puerto Montt; 10 goals)
67	1998		Colo-Colo (22)	Universidad de Chile	(Paraguay) Gustavo Benítez	Pedro González (Universidad de Chile; 23 goals)
68	1999		Universidad de Chile (10)	Universidad Católica	(Chile) César Vaccia	(Chile) Mario Núñez (O'Higgins; 34 goals)
69	2000		Universidad de Chile (11)	Cobreloa	(Chile) César Vaccia	Pedro González (Universidad de Chile; 26 goals)
70	2001		Santiago Wanderers (3)	Universidad Católica	(Chile) Jorge Garcés	(Chile) Héctor Tapia (Colo-Colo; 24 goals)
71	2002	Apertura	Universidad Católica (8)	Rangers	(Chile) Juvenal Olmos	(Chile) Sebastián González (Colo-Colo; 18 goals)
72	2002	Clausura	Colo-Colo (23)	Universidad Católica	(Chile) Jaime Pizarro	(Chile) Manuel Neira (Colo-Colo; 14 goals)
73	2003	Apertura	Cobreloa (6)	Colo-Colo	(Uruguay) (Chile) Nelson Acosta	(Paraguay) Salvador Cabañas (Audax Italiano; 18 goals)
74	2003	Clausura	Cobreloa (7)	Colo-Colo	(Uruguay) Luis Garisto	(Uruguay) Gustavo Biscayzacú (Unión Española; 21 goals)
75	2004	Apertura	Universidad de Chile (12)	Cobreloa	(Chile) Héctor Pinto	(Chile) Patricio Galaz (Cobreloa; 23 goals)
76	2004	Clausura	Cobreloa (8)	Unión Española	(Uruguay) (Chile) Nelson Acosta	(Chile) Patricio Galaz (Cobreloa; 19 goals)
77	2005	Apertura	Unión Española (6)	Coquimbo Unido	(Chile) Fernando Díaz	(Chile) Joel Estay (Everton; 13 goals) (Chile) Álvaro Sarabia (Deportes Puerto Montt; 13 goals) (Chile) Héctor Mancilla (Huachipato; 13 goals)
78	2005	Clausura	Universidad Católica (9)	Universidad de Chile	(Chile) Jorge Pellicer	(Chile) Cristián Montecinos (Deportes Concepción; 13 goals) (Chile) Gonzalo Fierro (Colo-Colo; 13 goals) (Chile) César Díaz (Cobresal; 13 goals)
79	2006	Apertura	Colo-Colo (24)	Universidad de Chile	(Argentina) Claudio Borghi	(Chile) Humberto Suazo (Colo-Colo; 19 goals)
80	2006	Clausura	Colo-Colo (25)	Audax Italiano	(Argentina) Claudio Borghi	(Chile) Leonardo Monje (Universidad de Concepción; 17 goals)
81	2007	Apertura	Colo-Colo (26)	Universidad Católica	(Argentina) Claudio Borghi	(Chile) Humberto Suazo (Colo-Colo; 18 goals)
82	2007	Clausura	Colo-Colo (27)	Universidad de Concepción	(Argentina) Claudio Borghi	(Chile) Carlos Villanueva (Audax Italiano; 20 goals)
83	2008	Apertura	Everton (4)	Colo-Colo	(Uruguay) (Chile) Nelson Acosta	(Argentina) Lucas Barrios (Colo-Colo; 19 goals)
84	2008	Clausura	Colo-Colo (28)	Palestino	(Argentina) (Chile) Marcelo Barticciotto	(Argentina) Lucas Barrios (Colo-Colo; 18 goals)
85	2009	Apertura	Universidad de Chile (13)	Unión Española	(Uruguay) Sergio Markarián	(Chile) Esteban Paredes (Santiago Morning; 17 goals)
86	2009	Clausura	Colo-Colo (29)	Universidad Católica	(Argentina) Hugo Tocalli	(Argentina) Diego Rivarola (Santiago Morning; 13 goals)
87	2010		Universidad Católica (10)	Colo-Colo	(Argentina) (Spain) Juan Antonio Pizzi	(Chile) Milovan Mirosevic (Universidad Católica; 19 goals)
88	2011	Apertura	Universidad de Chile (14)	Universidad Católica	(Argentina) Jorge Sampaoli	(Argentina) Matías Urbano (Unión San Felipe; 12 goals)
89	2011	Clausura	Universidad de Chile (15)	Cobreloa	(Argentina) Jorge Sampaoli	(Chile) Esteban Paredes (Colo-Colo; 14 goals)
90	2012	Apertura	Universidad de Chile (16)	O'Higgins	(Argentina) Jorge Sampaoli	(Argentina) Enzo Gutiérrez (O'Higgins; 11 goals)
91	2012	Clausura	Huachipato (2)	Unión Española	(Chile) Jorge Pellicer	(Argentina) Sebastián Sáez (Audax Italiano; 13 goals)
92	2013		Unión Española (7)	Universidad Católica	(Chile) José Luis Sierra	(Argentina) Javier Elizondo (Deportes Antofagasta; 14 goals) (Argentina) Sebastián Sáez (Audax Italiano; 14 goals)
93	2013–14	Apertura	O'Higgins (1)	Universidad Católica	(Argentina) Eduardo Berizzo	(Argentina) Luciano Vázquez (Ñublense; 11 goals)
94	2013–14	Clausura	Colo-Colo (30)	Universidad Católica	(Chile) Héctor Tapia	(Chile) Esteban Paredes (Colo-Colo; 16 goals)
95	2014–15	Apertura	Universidad de Chile (17)	Santiago Wanderers	(Uruguay) Martín Lasarte	(Chile) Esteban Paredes (Colo-Colo; 12 goals)
96	2014–15	Clausura	Cobresal (1)	Colo-Colo	(Argentina) Dalcio Giovagnoli	(Chile) Jean Paul Pineda (Unión La Calera; 11 goals) (Chile) Esteban Paredes (Colo-Colo; 11 goals)
97	2015–16	Apertura	Colo-Colo (31)	Universidad Católica	(Chile) José Luis Sierra	(Argentina) Marcos Riquelme (Palestino; 11 goals)
98	2015–16	Clausura	Universidad Católica (11)	Colo-Colo	(Chile) Mario Salas	(Chile) Nicolás Castillo (Universidad Católica; 11 goals)
99	2016–17	Apertura	Universidad Católica (12)	Deportes Iquique	(Chile) Mario Salas	(Chile) Nicolás Castillo (Universidad Católica; 13 goals)
100	2016–17	Clausura	Universidad de Chile (18)	Colo-Colo	(Argentina) Guillermo Hoyos	Felipe Mora (Universidad de Chile; 13 goals)
101	2017		Colo-Colo (32)	Unión Española	(Argentina) Pablo Guede	(Chile) Bryan Carrasco (Audax Italiano; 10 goals)
102	2018		Universidad Católica (13)	Universidad de Concepción	(Spain) Beñat San José	(Chile) Esteban Paredes (Colo-Colo; 19 goals)
103	2019		Universidad Católica (14)	Colo-Colo	(Argentina) (Bolivia) Gustavo Quinteros	(Argentina) Lucas Passerini (Palestino; 14 goals)
104	2020		Universidad Católica (15)	Unión La Calera	(Argentina) Ariel Holan	(Argentina) Fernando Zampedri (Universidad Católica; 20 goals)
105	2021		Universidad Católica (16)	Colo-Colo	(Argentina) Cristian Paulucci	(Argentina) Gonzalo Sosa (Deportes Melipilla; 23 goals) (Argentina) Fernando Zampedri (Universidad Católica; 23 goals)
106	2022		Colo-Colo (33)	Ñublense	(Argentina) (Bolivia) Gustavo Quinteros	(Argentina) Fernando Zampedri (Universidad Católica; 18 goals)
107	2023		Huachipato (3)	Cobresal	(Argentina) Gustavo Álvarez	(Argentina) Fernando Zampedri (Universidad Católica; 17 goals)
108	2024		Colo-Colo (34)	Universidad de Chile	(Argentina) Jorge Almirón	(Argentina) Fernando Zampedri (Universidad Católica; 19 goals)
Liga de Primera
109	2025		Coquimbo Unido (1)	Universidad Católica	(Chile) Esteban González	(Chile) Fernando Zampedri (Universidad Católica; 16 goals)
110	2026		Colo-Colo (35)		(Argentina) Fernando Ortiz	

Source (not for goalscorers): rsssf.com

== Titles by club ==
- Teams in **bold** compete in the Primera División as of the 2026 season.
- Italics indicates clubs that no longer exist or disaffiliated from the ANFP.

Rank	Club	Winners	Runners-up	Winning years	Runners-up years
1	**Colo-Colo**	35	22	1937, 1939, 1941, 1944, 1947, 1953, 1956, 1960, 1963, 1970, 1972, 1979, 1981, 1983, 1986, 1989, 1990, 1991, 1993, 1996, 1997 Clausura, 1998, 2002 Clausura, 2006 Apertura, 2006 Clausura, 2007 Apertura, 2007 Clausura, 2008 Clausura, 2009 Clausura, 2014 Clausura, 2015 Apertura, 2017 Transición, 2022, 2024, 2026	1933, 1943, 1952, 1954, 1955, 1958, 1959, 1966, 1973, 1982, 1987, 1992, 1997 Apertura, 2003 Apertura, 2003 Clausura, 2008 Apertura, 2010, 2015 Clausura, 2016 Clausura, 2017 Clausura, 2019, 2021
2	**Universidad de Chile**	18	9	1940, 1959, 1962, 1964, 1965, 1967, 1969, 1994, 1995, 1999, 2000, 2004 Apertura, 2009 Apertura, 2011 Apertura, 2011 Clausura, 2012 Apertura, 2014 Apertura, 2017 Clausura	1957, 1961, 1963, 1971, 1980, 1998, 2005 Clausura, 2006 Apertura, 2024
3	**Universidad Católica**	16	22	1949, 1954, 1961, 1966, 1984, 1987, 1997 Apertura, 2002 Apertura, 2005 Clausura, 2010, 2016 Clausura, 2016 Apertura, 2018, 2019, 2020, 2021	1962, 1964, 1965, 1967, 1968, 1989, 1990, 1994, 1995, 1996, 1997 Clausura, 1999, 2001, 2002 Clausura, 2007 Apertura, 2009 Clausura, 2011 Apertura, 2013 Transición, 2013 Apertura, 2014 Clausura, 2015 Apertura, 2025
4	Cobreloa	8	8	1980, 1982, 1985, 1988, 1992, 2003 Apertura, 2003 Clausura, 2004 Clausura	1978, 1979, 1981, 1983, 1993, 2000, 2004 Apertura, 2011 Clausura
5	Unión Española	7	10	1943, 1951, 1973, 1975, 1977, 2005 Apertura, 2013 Transición	1945, 1948, 1950, 1970, 1972, 1976, 2004 Clausura, 2009 Apertura, 2012 Clausura, 2017 Transición
6	**Audax Italiano**	4	8	1936, 1946, 1948, 1957	1934, 1935, 1938, 1940, 1944, 1947, 1951, 2006 Clausura
6	Magallanes	4	4	1933, 1934, 1935, 1938	1936, 1937, 1942, 1946
6	**Everton**	4	2	1950, 1952, 1976, 2008 Apertura	1977, 1985
9	Santiago Wanderers	3	4	1958, 1968, 2001	1949, 1956, 1960, 2014 Apertura
9	**Huachipato**	3	—	1974, 2012 Clausura, 2023	—
11	**Palestino**	2	4	1955, 1978	1953, 1974, 1986, 2008 Clausura
12	**Cobresal**	1	3	2015 Clausura	1984, 1988, 2023
12	**Coquimbo Unido**	1	2	2025	1991, 2005 Apertura
12	Santiago Morning	1	2	1942	1939, 1941
12	**O'Higgins**	1	1	2013 Apertura	2012 Apertura
12	Green Cross	1	—	1945	—
12	Unión San Felipe	1	—	1971	—

Titles won by club (%)
1. Colo Colo - 35 (31.5%)
2. Universidad de Chile - 18 (16.7%)
3. Universidad Católica – 16 (14.8%)
4. Cobreloa - 8 (7.40%)
5. Unión Española – 7 (6.50%)
6. Magallanes – 4 (3.70%)
7. Audax Italiano – 4 (3.70%)
8. Everton - 4 (3.70%)
9. Other teams - 13 (12.0%)

== Titles by region ==
Region	Nº of titles	Clubs
Metropolitana	88	Colo-Colo (35), Universidad de Chile (18), Universidad Católica (16), Unión Española (7), Magallanes (4), Audax Italiano (4), Palestino (2), Santiago Morning (1), Green Cross (1)
Antofagasta	8	Cobreloa (8)
Valparaíso	8	Everton (4), Santiago Wanderers (3), Unión San Felipe (1)
Biobío	3	Huachipato (3)
Atacama	1	Cobresal (1)
O'Higgins	1	O'Higgins (1)
Coquimbo	1	Coquimbo Unido (1)

== All-time goalscorers ==
Rank	Country	Player	Goals	Years
1	(Chile)	Esteban Paredes	221	2000-2022
2	(Chile)	Francisco Valdés	215	1961-1983
3	(Chile)	Pedro González	214	1985-2006
4	(Chile)	Honorino Landa	193	1959-1974
5	(Argentina)	Óscar Fabbiani	188	1974-1987
6	(Chile)	Marcelo Corrales	188	1990-2007
7	(Chile)	Carlos Campos	184	1956-1969
8	(Chile)	Jaime Riveros	175	1990-2011
9	(Chile)	Atilio Cremaschi	174	1941-1960
10	(Chile)	Carlos Caszely	171	1967-1986
11	(Chile)	José Fernández	171	1948-1961
12	(Chile)	Luis Hernán Álvarez	168	1958-1969
13	(Chile)	Juan Soto	166	1957-1969
14	(Chile)	Leonel Sánchez	161	1953-1970
15	(Chile)	Anibal González	156	1983-2001
16	(Chile)	Julio Crisosto	154	1969-1983

== See also ==
- Primera B de Chile
