= Hugo Bravo (footballer, born 1944) =

Chilean footballer (1944–2020)

Personal information
- Full name: Víctor Hugo Bravo Sobarzo
- Date of birth: 6 May 1944
- Place of birth: Santiago, Chile
- Date of death: 2 February 2020 (aged 75)
- Place of death: Chile
- Height: 1.67 m (5 ft 6 in)
- Position: Midfielder

Youth career
- Esfuerzo de Chile
- Liceo Valentín Letelier
- 1956–1964: Universidad de Chile

Senior career*
Years	Team	Apps	(Gls)
1964–1965	Universidad de Chile	0	(0)
1964	→ Ñublense (loan)		
1965	→ Huachipato (loan)		
1966–1969	Unión La Calera	111	(13)
1970–1971	Antofagasta Portuario	59	(3)
1972–1974	Jorge Wilstermann		
1974	Bolívar		
1974	Aurora		
- * Club domestic league appearances and goals

Víctor Hugo Bravo Sobarzo (6 May 1944 – 2 February 2020), known as Hugo Bravo, was a Chilean footballer who played as a midfielder.

== Career ==
Born in Santiago, Chile, Bravo was with club Esfuerzo de Chile from Recoleta and the team of Liceo Valentín Letelier before joining the Universidad de Chile youth system in 1956, coinciding with players such as Juan Rodríguez Vega, Roberto Hodge, Juan Abel Ganga and Pedro Araya. In 1964 and 1965, he played on loan for Ñublense and Huachipato in the Chilean Segunda División, respectively.

Subsequently, he spent four seasons with Unión La Calera in the Chilean top level, coinciding with historical players of the club such as the Uruguayan Pedro Graffigna, the Peruvian Gerardo Delgado, the Argentine Felipe Bracamonte and the Chileans Manuel Saavedra and Osvaldo Castro.

The next two seasons, he played for Antofagasta Portuario, alongside players such as Mario Moreno and Francisco Chamaco Valdés.

In 1972, Bravo moved to Bolivia and joined Jorge Wilstermann alongside his fellow Fernando Cavalleri, becoming the first foreign players in the club history. He played for them between 1972 and 1974, winning two national championships in 1972 and 1973. Firstly a left-footed playmaker, in Bolivia he turned into a defensive midfielder. He was part of a well remembered squad that defeated San Lorenzo and River Plate, both considered in the Argentine Big Five, in the 1973 Copa Libertadores.

His last clubs were Bolívar in 1974, where he coincided with Juan Abel Ganga again, since they had coincided in Universidad de Chile, Antofagasta Portuario and Jorge Wilstermann, and Aurora.

== Personal life ==
Bravo lived in Bolivia for fourteen years, where he owned a seafood restaurant in Cochabamba. He returned to his homeland in 1985.

He had four children called Rodrigo, Gianina, Carolina and Claudia.

In Chile, he was nicknamed Chico (Short) due to his height. In Bolivia, he was nicknamed El Mariachi due to his resemblance with Mexican musicians.

He died on 2 February 2020.
