= List of Colo-Colo players =

Many of South America's top footballers and prolific goal scorers have played for the Chilean club Colo-Colo (Club Social y Deportivo Colo-Colo) over the years.

== Players ==
- (Australia) John Crawley

== Player records ==
=== Primera División Topscorers ===
- (Chile) Luis Carvallo: 9 (1933)
- (Chile) Aurelio Domínguez: 12 (1935)
- (Chile) Alfonso Domínguez: 32 (1939), 19 (1944)
- (Chile) George Robledo: 26 (1953), 25 (1954)
- (Chile) Luis Hernán Álvarez: 37 (1963)
- (Chile) Julio Crisosto: 28 (1974)
- (Chile) Carlos Caszely: 20 (1979), 26 (1980), 20 (1981)
- (Chile) Rubén Martínez: 22 (1990), 23 (1991)
- (Chile) Aníbal González: 24 (1992)
- (Chile) Héctor Tapia: 24 (2001)
- (Chile) Sebastián González: 18 (2002 Apertura)
- (Chile) Manuel Neira: 14 (2002 Clausura)
- (Chile) Gonzalo Fierro: 13 (2005 Clausura)
- (Chile) Humberto Suazo: 19 (2006 Apertura)
- (Chile) Humberto Suazo: 18 (2007 Apertura)
- (Argentina) (Paraguay) Lucas Barrios: 19 (2008 Apertura)
- (Argentina) (Paraguay) Lucas Barrios: 18 (2008 Clausura)

=== International Topscores ===
- (Chile) Carlos Caszely: 9 (1973 Copa Libertadores)
- (Chile) Humberto Suazo: 10 (2006 Copa Sudamericana)
- (Chile) Matías Fernández: 9 (2006 Copa Sudamericana)

=== The World's Top Goal Scorer ===
- (Chile) Humberto Suazo: 35 (2006)
- (Argentina) (Paraguay) Lucas Barrios: 37 (2008)

=== South American Player of the Year ===
- (Chile) Gabriel Mendoza (1991)
- (Bolivia) Marco Antonio Etcheverry (1993)
- (Chile) Matías Fernández (2006)
- (Chile) Humberto Suazo (2006)

==== South American Footballer of the Year ====
- (Chile) Matías Fernández (2006)
