= 1933 Campeonato Nacional Primera División =

Campeonato Nacional de Fútbol Profesional
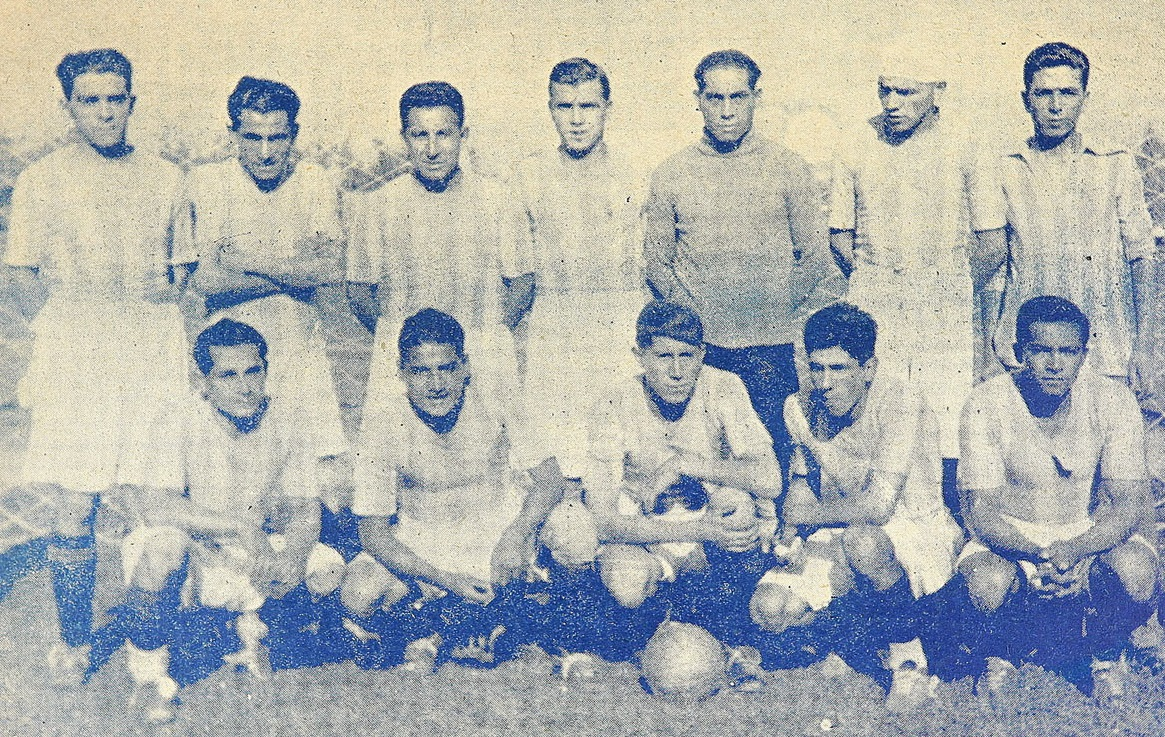
- Magallanes, Chilean top-tier's first ever champion
- Dates: 22 July 1933 – 5 November 1933
- Champions: Magallanes (1st title)
- Matches: 29
- Goals: 131 (4.52 per match)
- Top goalscorer: Luis Carvallo (9 goals)
- Biggest home win: Colo-Colo 7–2 Audax Italiano (3 September); Badminton 7–2 Audax Italiano (24 September)

The 1933 Campeonato Nacional de Fútbol Profesional was the inaugural season the top tier of Chilean football. The season began on 22 July and ended on 5 November 1933.

The winner of this first-ever season, was Magallanes.

== Scores ==
	AUD	BAD	COL	GCR	MAG	MOS	SNA	UES
Audax		2–7	2–7	2–1	0–4	3–1	4–1	1–2
Bádminton			2–4	5–2	0–1	1–0	6–1	2–2
Colo-Colo				2–1	1–3	3–1	4–0	2–0
Green Cross					3–5	2–4	2–2	2–1
Magallanes						5–1	3–0	2–3
Morning S.							4–3	1–1
S. National								3–1
U. Española								

== Standings ==
Pos	Team	Pld	W	D	L	GF	GA	GR	Pts	Qualification
1	Magallanes	7	6	0	1	23	8	2.875	12	Qualified to the Championship play-off
2	Colo-Colo	7	6	0	1	23	9	2.556	12	Qualified to the Championship play-off
3	Badminton	7	4	1	2	23	12	1.917	9	
4	Unión Española	7	2	2	3	10	13	0.769	6	
5	Audax Italiano	7	3	0	4	14	23	0.609	6	
6	Morning Star	7	2	1	4	12	18	0.667	5	
7	Green Cross	7	1	1	5	13	21	0.619	3	
8	Santiago National	7	1	1	5	10	24	0.417	3	

== Championship play-off ==
Due to the draw in the table's first place, it was decided that Magallanes and Colo-Colo play a tie-breaker match.

Both teams, before the game, developed its concentrations in towns near to Santiago. Magallanes players did it in Peñaflor, whilst the team of Colo-Colo did it in Apoquindo.

5 November 1933
17:00 UTC−04:00

Colo-Colo	1 – 2	Magallanes
Bravo 6'	Report	Carmona 10'; Lorca 71' (o.g.)

Campos de Sports, Ñuñoa, Santiago
Attendance: 4,000
Referee: C. Fanta

Campeonato Profesional
1933 champions
Magallanes
1st title

== Topscorer ==
Name	Team	Goals
(Chile) Luis Carvallo	Colo-Colo	9
