= 1946 Campeonato Nacional Primera División =

Campeonato Nacional de Fútbol Profesional
- Dates: 13 April 1946 – 22 December 1946
- Champions: Audax Italiano (2nd title)
- Matches: 192
- Goals: 780 (4.06 per match)
- Top goalscorer: Ubaldo Cruche (25 goals)
- Biggest home win: Everton 7–0 Badminton (15 September)
- Total attendance: 1,167,362
- Average attendance: 6,080

The 1946 Campeonato Nacional de Fútbol Profesional was Chilean first tier’s 14th season. Audax Italiano was the tournament’s champion, winning its second title.

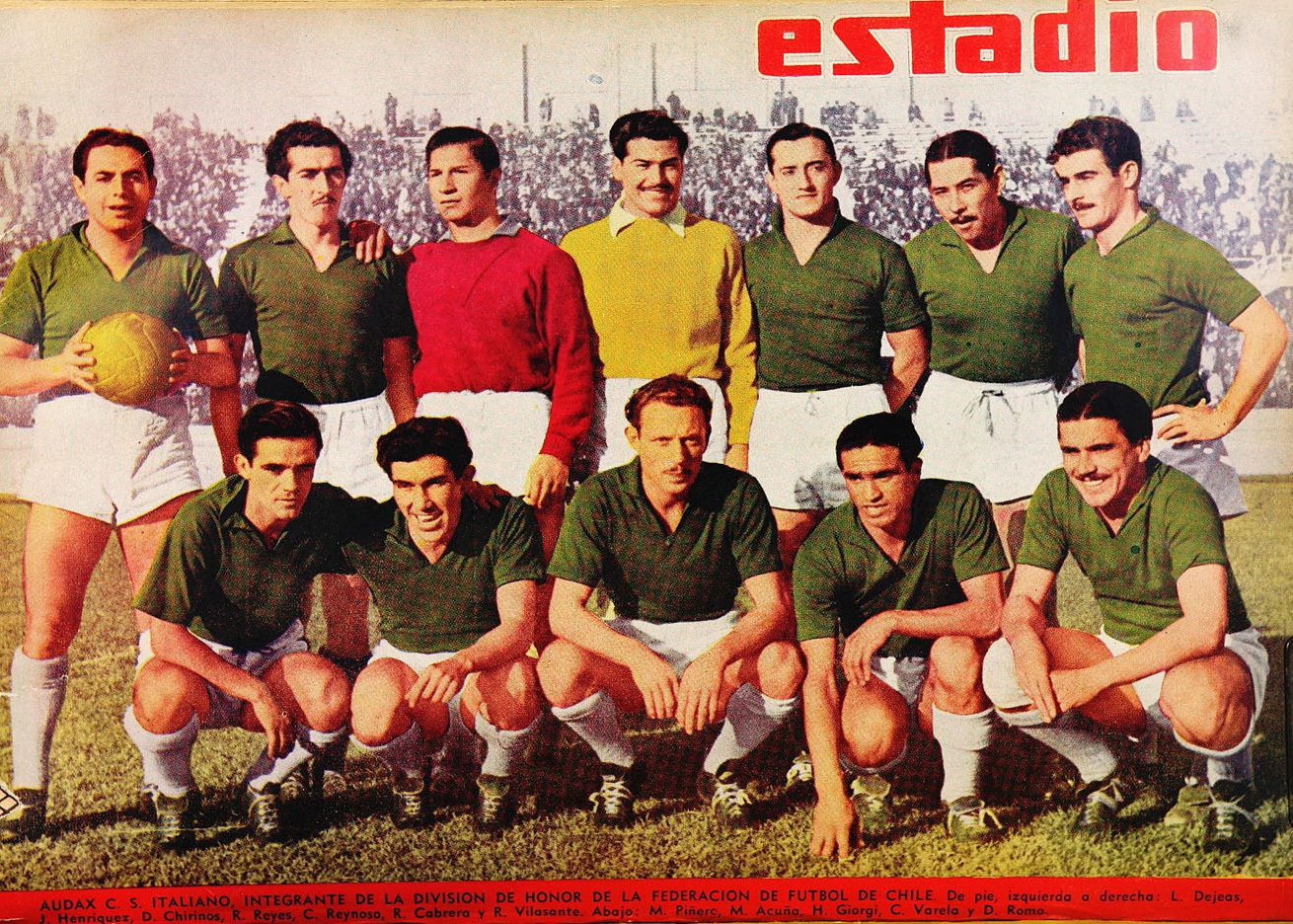
Audax Italiano's champion team in 1946

== First stage ==
=== Scores ===
	AUD	BAD	COL	EVE	GCR	IBE	MAG	SMO	SNA	UES	UCA	UCH	SWA
Audax		3–1	2–0	4–1	3–1	4–2	2–4	3–2	2–4	3–2	2–1	3–2	1–1
Badminton	1–6		0–0	4–2	5–2	8–5	3–3	0–2	4–2	3–3	1–1	1–1	0–1
Colo-Colo	3–3	2–1		0–2	1–1	4–0	3–3	1–5	2–2	4–1	3–1	2–2	3–1
Everton	1–0	7–0	1–2		1–5	2–0	1–1	2–2	3–3	0–0	1–4	1–3	2–1
Green Cross	3–1	1–5	2–2	2–4		6–2	3–2	3–3	6–1	2–0	0–3	3–7	2–2
Iberia	2–2	1–4	1–3	3–1	2–3		0–2	4–2	2–2	0–2	6–1	1–1	1–2
Magallanes	3–1	1–1	4–4	2–0	6–2	0–0		1–0	6–4	3–1	3–2	3–4	0–1
S. Morning	2–3	3–3	1–0	3–2	1–2	0–1	1–1		3–2	1–4	0–2	2–2	4–4
S. National	2–5	2–2	1–5	1–2	1–4	0–0	1–5	4–3		3–2	0–1	1–5	3–2
U. Española	1–3	3–1	1–1	1–1	1–1	2–1	2–3	2–3	2–2		3–0	2–1	0–2
U. Católica	4–1	1–1	2–2	2–1	1–2	1–0	2–2	3–4	0–1	1–1		1–0	1–0
U. de Chile	1–1	6–1	0–2	1–3	2–1	1–0	2–1	1–0	5–3	2–4	2–2		3–1
S. Wanderers	2–1	5–2	1–1	2–0	3–4	1–4	1–1	2–1	6–2	2–5	3–0	1–1	

=== Standings ===
Pos	Team	Pld	W	D	L	GF	GA	GD	Pts	Qualification
1	Magallanes	24	11	9	4	60	41	+19	31	Championship Zone
2	Audax Italiano	24	13	4	7	59	46	+13	30	Championship Zone
3	Universidad de Chile	24	11	7	6	55	40	+15	29	Championship Zone
4	Colo-Colo	24	9	11	4	50	38	+12	29	Championship Zone
5	Green Cross	24	11	5	8	61	59	+2	27	Championship Zone
6	Santiago Wanderers	24	10	6	8	47	42	+5	26	Championship Zone
7	Universidad Católica	24	9	6	9	37	39	−2	24	
8	Unión Española	24	8	7	9	45	43	+2	23	
9	Santiago Morning	24	8	6	10	50	52	−2	22	
10	Everton	24	8	5	11	41	46	−5	21	
11	Badminton	24	6	9	9	52	63	−11	21	
12	Iberia	24	5	5	14	38	54	−16	15	
13	Santiago National	24	4	6	14	47	79	−32	14	

== Championship stage ==
=== Scores ===
	AUD	COL	GCR	MAG	UCH	SWA
Audax		2–1	3–2	1–0	0–0	1–1
Colo-Colo			0–2	0–2	2–2	0–1
Green Cross				3–4	2–2	3–1
Magallanes					2–2	1–2
U. de Chile						1–1
S. Wanderers						

=== Standings ===
Pos	Team	Pld	W	D	L	GF	GA	GD	Pts
1	Audax Italiano	5	3	2	0	7	4	+3	8
2	Santiago Wanderers	5	2	2	1	6	6	0	6
3	Green Cross	5	2	1	2	12	10	+2	5
4	Magallanes	5	2	1	2	9	8	+1	5
5	Universidad de Chile	5	0	5	0	7	7	0	5
6	Colo-Colo	5	0	1	4	3	9	−6	1

== Non-Championship stage ==
=== Scores ===
	BAD	EVE	IBE	SMO	SNA	UES	UCA
Badminton		2–2	3–3	3–1	3–1	2–2	2–1
Everton			3–2	2–2	3–1	2–4	3–1
Iberia				0–0	4–1	1–2	3–1
S. Morning					3–4	2–5	2–3
S. National						1–4	4–2
U. Española							3–1
U. Católica							

=== Standings ===
Pos	Team	Pld	W	D	L	GF	GA	GD	Pts
1	Unión Española	6	5	1	0	20	9	+11	11
2	Badminton	6	3	3	0	15	10	+5	9
3	Everton	6	3	2	1	15	12	+3	8
4	Iberia	6	2	2	2	13	10	+3	6
5	Santiago National	6	2	0	4	12	19	−7	4
6	Santiago Morning	6	0	2	4	10	17	−7	2
7	Universidad Católica	6	1	0	5	9	17	−8	2

== Aggregate standings ==
Pos	Team	Pld	W	D	L	GF	GA	GD	Pts	Qualification
1	Audax Italiano	29	16	6	7	66	50	+16	38	Champions
2	Magallanes	29	13	10	6	69	49	+20	36	
3	Universidad de Chile	29	11	12	6	62	47	+15	34	
4	Santiago Wanderers	29	12	8	9	53	48	+5	32	
5	Green Cross	29	13	6	10	73	69	+4	32	
6	Colo-Colo	29	9	12	8	53	47	+6	30	
7	Unión Española	30	13	8	9	65	52	+13	34	
8	Badminton	30	9	12	9	67	73	−6	30	
9	Everton	30	11	7	12	56	58	−2	29	
10	Universidad Católica	30	10	6	14	46	56	−10	26	
11	Santiago Morning	30	8	8	14	60	69	−9	24	
12	Iberia	30	7	7	16	51	64	−13	21	
13	Santiago National	30	6	6	18	59	98	−39	18	

Campeonato Profesional
1946 champions

Audax Italiano
2nd title

== Topscorer ==
Name	Team	Goals
(Uruguay) Ubaldo Cruche	Universidad de Chile	25
