= Luis Vidal (footballer, born 1916) =

Chilean footballer (1916-1999)

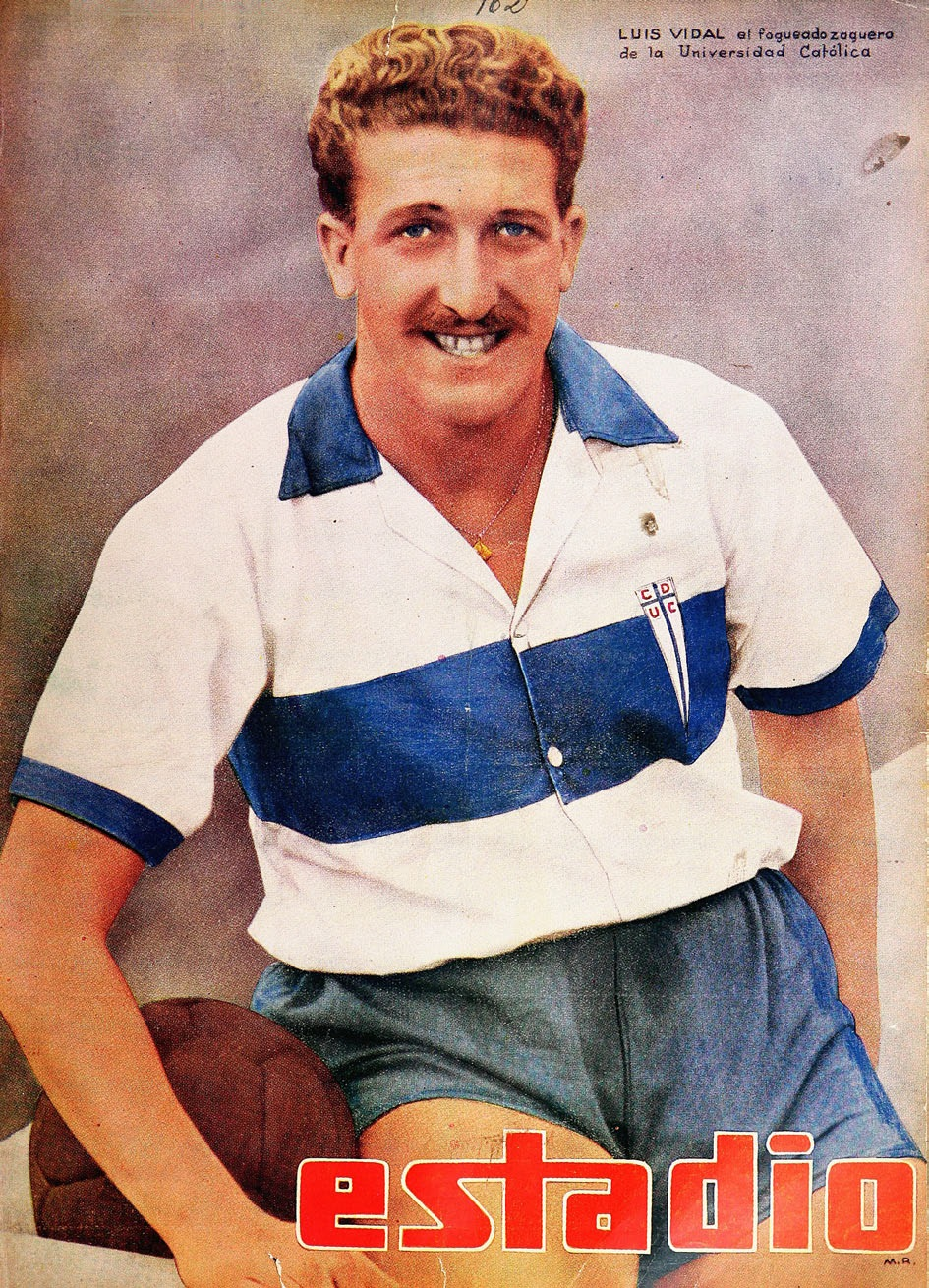
- Vidal in 1946

Personal information
- Full name: Luis Enrique Vidal Gimó
- Date of birth: 30 March 1916
- Date of death: 27 February 1999 (aged 82)
- Position: Defender

Youth career
- 1926: Colegio San Agustín
- 1927–1933: UD Española

Senior career*
Years	Team	Apps	(Gls)
1933–1934	UD Española		
1935–1938	Unión Española		
1939–1949	Universidad Católica		

International career
1941	Chile	3	(0)

Managerial career
- 1952: Iberia
- 1954: Deportes La Calera
- 1966–1967: Universidad Católica
- 1972: O'Higgins
- 1974: Emelec
- * Club domestic league appearances and goals

Luis Enrique Vidal Gimó (30 March 1916 – 27 February 1999) was a Chilean footballer who played as a centre back.

== Career ==
At the age of 10, Vidal played for Colegio San Agustín. A year later, he joined Unión Deportiva Española youth system. He was promoted to the first team in 1933 and made his professional debut in 1936. In 1939, he switched to Universidad Católica, winning the 1949 Primera División, despite the fact that he was injured. In both Unión Española and Universidad Católica, he coincided with Fernando Riera, whom he nicknamed Tata (In Chile, an informal form for Grandfather).

At international level, he played in three matches for the Chile national team in 1941, being part of Chile's squad for the 1941 South American Championship.

As manager of Universidad Católica, he won the 1966 Primera División. He also was the coach of Deportes La Calera, O'Higgins, and Emelec

== Personal life ==
He was nicknamed Huacho, an informal way how Chileans refer to orphans.

== Honours ==
=== Player ===
Universidad Católica

- Chilean Primera División: 1949

=== Manager ===
Universidad Católica

- Chilean Primera División: 1966
