= Eugenio Soto (footballer) =

Chilean footballer (1909-1998)

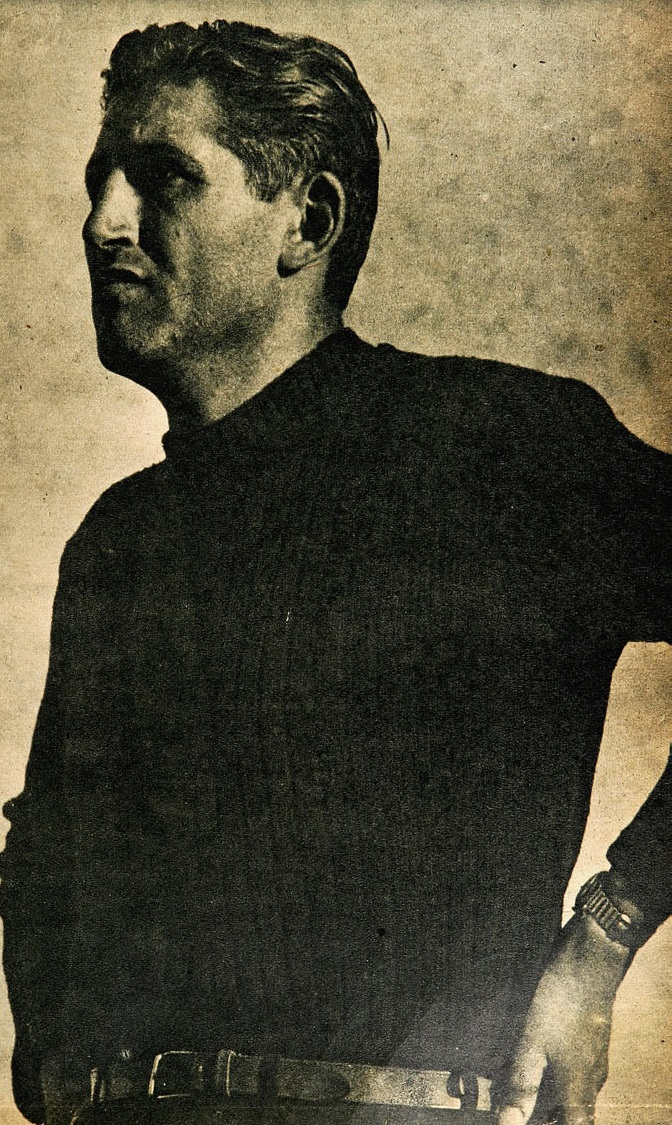

Personal information
- Full name: Eugenio Soto Cañete
- Date of birth: 28 December 1909
- Date of death: 3 January 1998 (aged 88)
- Position: Goalkeeper

Senior career*
| Years | Team | Apps | (Gls) |
- Deportes Magallanes
- Colo-Colo

International career
| 1937 | Chile | 1 | (0) |

Managerial career
- Green Cross
- * Club domestic league appearances and goals

Eugenio Soto Cañete (28 December 1909 – 3 January 1998) was a Chilean footballer. He played in one match for the Chile national football team in 1937. He was also part of Chile's squad for the 1937 South American Championship.

After his playing career, Soto managed Chilean club Green Cross, guiding them to their first and only Primera División title in 1945.
