= 1948 Campeonato Nacional Primera División =

Campeonato Nacional de Fútbol Profesional
- Dates: 17 April 1948 – 27 November 1948
- Champions: Audax Italiano (3rd title)
- Relegated: Santiago National
- Matches: 156
- Goals: 638 (4.09 per match)
- Top goalscorer: Juan Zárate (22 goals)
- Biggest home win: Universidad Católica 8–1 Santiago National (30 May)
- Total attendance: 947,969
- Average attendance: 6,076

The 1948 Campeonato Nacional de Fútbol Profesional was Chilean first tier’s 16th season. Audax Italiano were the champions, winning their third league title.

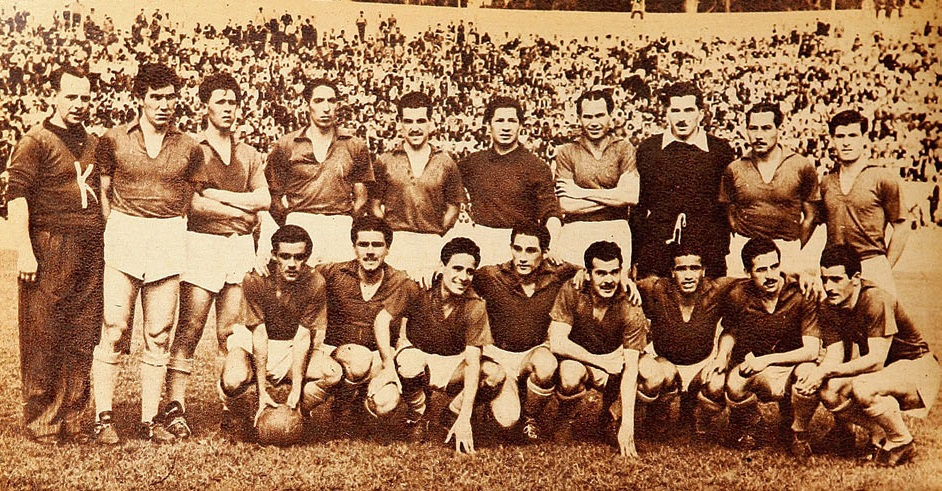
Audax Italiano’s champion team in 1948

== Scores ==
	AUD	BAD	COL	EVE	GCR	IBE	MAG	SMO	SNA	UES	UCA	UCH	SWA
Audax		4–0	1–0	4–2	5–2	2–1	2–2	2–2	1–2	0–0	5–4	3–4	2–0
Badminton	1–2		2–4	0–1	1–1	1–3	2–5	0–6	4–8	0–7	3–1	2–4	4–0
Colo-Colo	2–2	3–1		2–1	1–0	0–2	2–2	2–1	3–0	1–3	2–2	4–2	0–2
Everton	0–1	3–1	1–1		3–2	0–0	3–2	3–2	3–1	1–4	3–0	2–4	4–1
Green Cross	2–7	0–3	3–2	2–5		1–3	2–3	2–2	1–2	2–1	3–1	1–2	1–1
Iberia	2–4	1–2	1–1	1–0	1–1		2–1	4–1	3–2	3–3	2–1	2–1	2–4
Magallanes	4–1	5–3	2–2	1–3	1–2	3–3		0–1	4–0	2–5	3–0	3–3	2–2
S. Morning	0–1	2–1	1–2	3–3	0–1	2–1	2–1		3–2	2–2	1–2	1–1	4–1
S. National	3–7	2–1	2–4	0–1	3–4	0–4	3–4	0–0		1–4	2–5	2–4	0–2
U. Española	1–1	4–5	1–0	4–0	5–1	2–3	4–2	2–3	4–1		1–3	0–3	0–1
U. Católica	3–2	2–4	1–0	0–1	4–1	2–0	2–2	0–2	8–1	1–1		2–1	1–2
U. de Chile	1–3	1–2	0–1	2–1	3–2	2–1	1–3	6–2	1–0	0–2	3–3		2–3
S. Wanderers	2–4	0–2	1–3	3–1	3–4	4–1	0–2	1–3	4–2	1–2	2–4	2–2	

== Standings ==
Pos	Team	Pld	W	D	L	GF	GA	GD	Pts	Qualification
1	Audax Italiano	24	15	5	4	66	40	+26	35	Champions
2	Unión Española	24	12	5	7	62	37	+25	29	
3	Colo-Colo	24	11	6	7	42	34	+8	28	
4	Santiago Morning	24	11	5	8	46	40	+6	27	
5	Iberia	24	11	5	8	46	40	+6	27	
6	Everton	24	12	3	9	45	41	+4	27	
7	Universidad de Chile	24	11	4	9	53	47	+6	26	
8	Magallanes	24	9	7	8	59	50	+9	25	
9	Universidad Católica	24	10	4	10	52	47	+5	24	
10	Santiago Wanderers	24	9	3	12	42	52	−10	21	
11	Green Cross	24	7	4	13	41	62	−21	18	
12	Badminton	24	8	1	15	45	69	−24	17	
13	Santiago National	24	4	0	20	39	79	−40	8	

Campeonato Profesional
1948 champions

3rd title

== Topscorer ==
Name	Team	Goals
(Argentina) Juan Zárate	Audax Italiano	22

== Relegation ==
Pos	Team	1946	1947	1948	Total
1	Audax Italiano	38	31	35	104
2	Colo-Colo	30	38	28	96
3	Unión Española	34	27	29	90
4	Universidad de Chile	34	27	26	87
5	Magallanes	36	23	25	84
6	Santiago Wanderers	32	25	21	78
7	Universidad Católica	26	26	24	76
8	Green Cross	32	23	18	73
9	Everton	29	16	27	72
10	Badminton	30	24	17	71
11	Santiago Morning	24	17	27	68
12	Iberia	21	16	27	64
13	Santiago National	18	19	8	45

Relegated to 1949 División de Honor Amateur
