= 1945 Campeonato Nacional Primera División =

Campeonato Nacional de Fútbol Profesional
- Dates: 19 May – 2 December 1945
- Champions: Green Cross (1st title)
- Matches: 132
- Goals: 534 (4.05 per match)
- Top goalscorer: Ubaldo Cruche; Juan Zárate; Hugo Giorgi (17 goals)
- Biggest home win: Audax Italiano 9–2 Universidad Católica (14 October)
- Total attendance: 742,254
- Average attendance: 5,623

The 1945 Campeonato Nacional de Fútbol Profesional was Chilean first tier’s 13th season. Green Cross was the tournament’s champion, winning its first title.

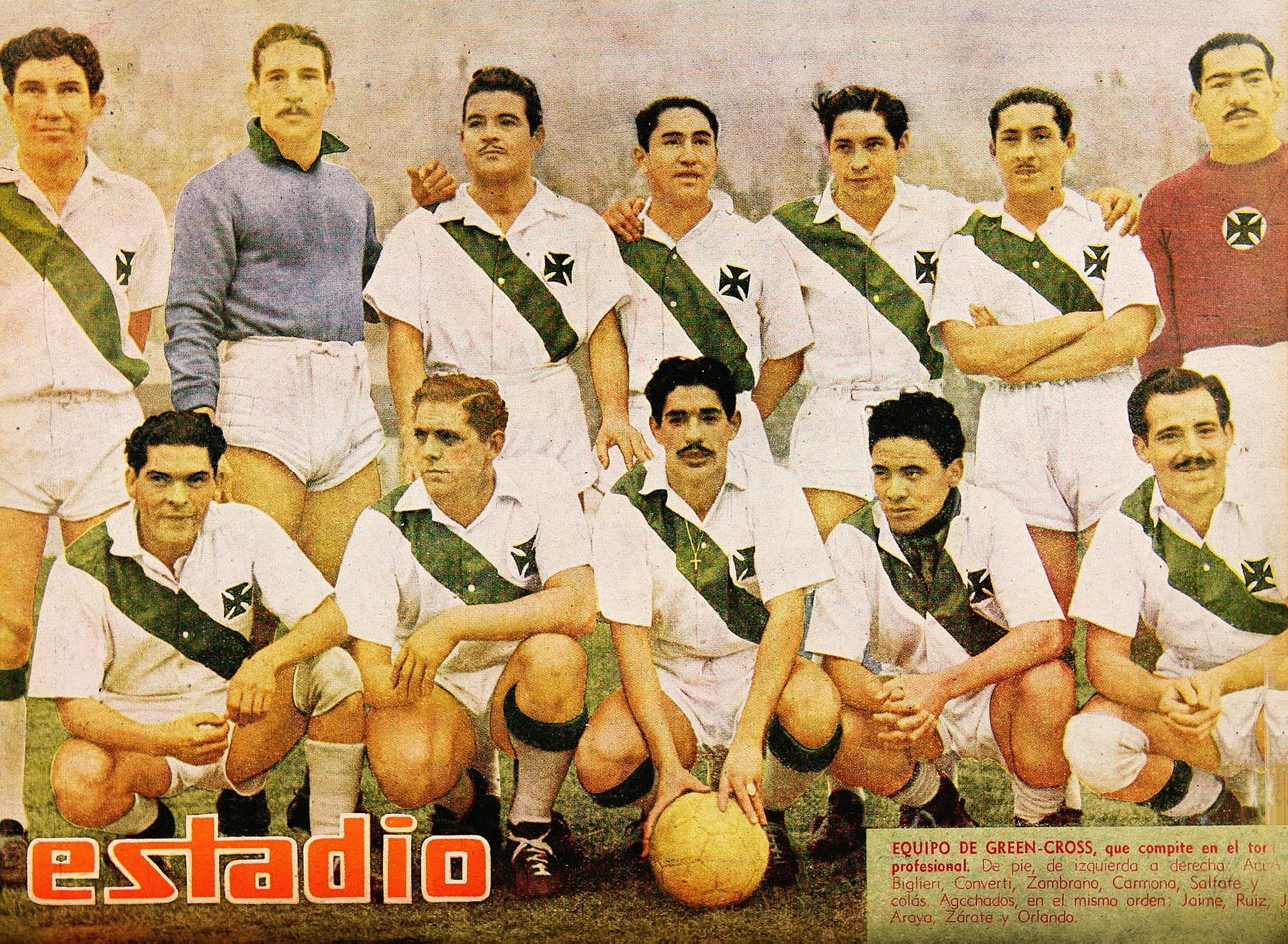
Green Cross champion team in 1945

== Scores ==
	AUD	COL	BAD	EVE	GCR	MAG	SMO	SNA	UES	UCA	UCH	SWA
Audax		2–1	2–0	3–3	0–5	4–1	5–2	1–3	3–5	9–2	3–3	2–1
Bádminton	1–4		3–4	0–3	1–1	0–4	2–4	0–2	3–3	0–0	3–2	0–1
Colo-Colo	4–0	2–1		5–1	3–5	2–1	2–3	0–2	2–0	1–2	1–2	0–0
Everton	3–2	1–3	1–0		1–4	2–0	7–3	1–1	1–0	1–1	1–3	2–2
Green Cross	3–0	4–1	1–2	1–0		1–0	5–2	2–2	2–3	3–2	5–2	0–0
Magallanes	1–5	3–2	1–0	1–1	2–1		2–1	2–1	0–1	3–1	0–2	1–5
S. Morning	3–1	2–2	3–1	3–1	3–4	0–1		5–4	1–0	1–3	2–0	4–1
S. National	1–2	2–2	1–3	3–2	4–2	2–4	2–2		2–2	1–5	0–4	3–2
U. Española	2–0	5–1	3–2	0–1	1–1	1–3	3–2	3–0		1–2	3–2	1–1
U. Católica	0–1	1–2	4–3	1–1	4–4	4–3	1–1	2–2	2–3		1–4	6–3
U. de Chile	2–2	3–1	1–1	4–3	1–2	4–0	4–2	1–2	2–2	2–0		4–1
S. Wanderers	1–1	2–0	1–1	1–4	2–2	2–2	4–1	6–2	4–1	1–1	3–2	

== Standings ==
Pos	Team	Pld	W	D	L	GF	GA	GD	Pts	Qualification
1	Green Cross	22	12	6	4	58	36	+22	30	Champions
2	Unión Española	22	11	5	6	46	36	+10	27	
3	Universidad de Chile	22	11	4	7	54	38	+16	26	
4	Audax Italiano	22	10	4	8	52	47	+5	24	
5	Santiago Wanderers	22	7	9	6	44	40	+4	23	
6	Magallanes	22	10	2	10	35	42	−7	22	
7	Santiago Morning	22	9	3	10	50	55	−5	21	
8	Universidad Católica	22	7	7	8	45	50	−5	21	
9	Everton	22	7	6	9	40	44	−4	20	
10	Santiago National	22	7	6	9	42	53	−11	20	
11	Colo-Colo	22	8	3	11	39	38	+1	19	
12	Bádminton	22	3	5	14	29	55	−26	11	

Campeonato Profesional
1945 champions
Green Cross
1st title

== Topscorer ==
Name	Team	Goals
(Uruguay) Ubaldo Cruche	Universidad de Chile	17
(Argentina) Juan Zárate	Green Cross	17
(Argentina) Hugo Giorgi	Audax Italiano	17
