= 1935 Campeonato Nacional Primera División =

Campeonato Nacional de Fútbol Profesional
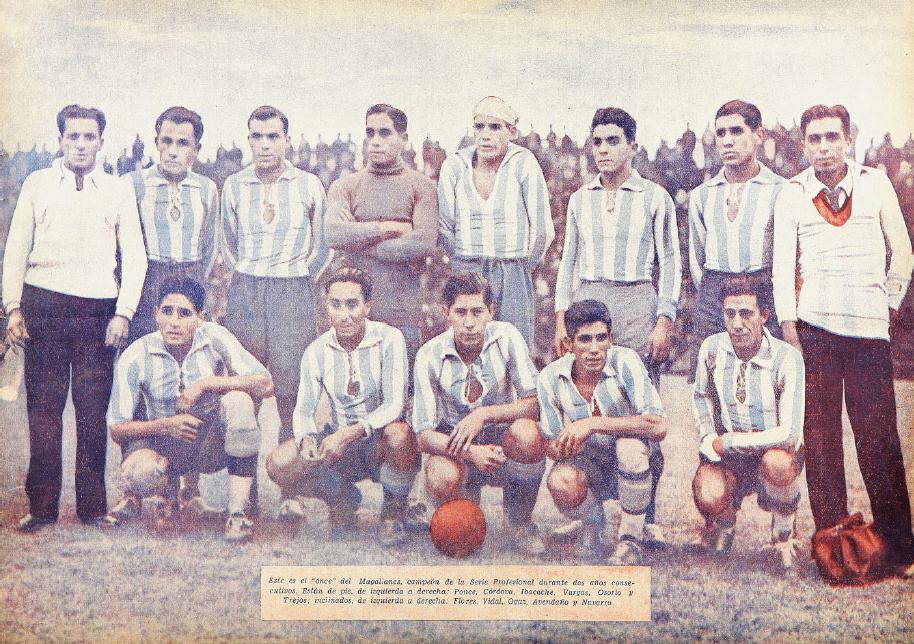
- Magallanes, champions
- Dates: 12 May 1935 – 10 November 1935
- Champions: Magallanes (3rd title)
- Matches: 30
- Goals: 165 (5.5 per match)
- Top goalscorer: Guillermo Ogaz; Aurelio Domínguez (12 goals)
- Biggest home win: Audax Italiano 6–0 Unión Española (20 October)
- Total attendance: 95,231
- Average attendance: 3,283

The 1935 Campeonato Nacional de Fútbol Profesional was Chilean first tier's 3rd season. Magallanes were the champions, achieving thereby three consecutive titles and being the first ever Chilean team in do it.

== Scores ==
	AUD	BAD	COL	MAG	SAN	UES
Audax		1–3	3–3	3–5	7–2	2–1
Bádminton	4–5		2–5	3–7	2–2	3–2
Colo-Colo	4–5	0–2		2–1	4–3	2–3
Magallanes	1–3	3–2	1–3		5–2	3–1
Santiago	5–5	1–3	3–3	0–4		2–2
U. Española	0–6	2–4	0–2	0–5	3–0	

== Standings ==
Pos	Team	Pld	W	D	L	GF	GA	GR	Pts	Qualification
1	Magallanes	10	7	0	3	35	19	1.842	14	Champions
2	Audax Italiano	10	6	2	2	40	28	1.429	13 (Note: 1 point deducted)	
3	Badminton	10	5	1	4	28	28	1.000	12 (Note: 1 bonus point awarded)	
4	Colo-Colo	10	5	2	3	28	23	1.217	11	
5	Unión Española	10	2	1	7	14	29	0.483	6	
6	Santiago	10	0	4	6	20	38	0.526	4	

Source: rsssf.com
Notes:

Campeonato Profesional
1935 champions
Magallanes
3rd title

== Topscorer ==
Name	Team	Goals
(Chile) Guillermo Ogaz	Magallanes	12
(Chile) Aurelio Domínguez	Colo-Colo	12
