= 1964 Campeonato Nacional Primera División =

Campeonato Nacional de Fútbol Profesional
- Dates: 18 April 1964 – 20 December 1964
- Champions: Universidad de Chile (5th title)
- Relegated: Ferrobádminton
- 1965 Copa Campeones: Universidad de Chile
- Matches: 306
- Goals: 967 (3.16 per match)
- Top goalscorer: Daniel Escudero (25)
- Biggest home win: Colo-Colo 7–1 Unión San Felipe (14 November)
- Highest attendance: 73,801 Universidad Católica 0–1 Universidad de Chile (2 August)
- Total attendance: 2,931,965
- Average attendance: 9,581

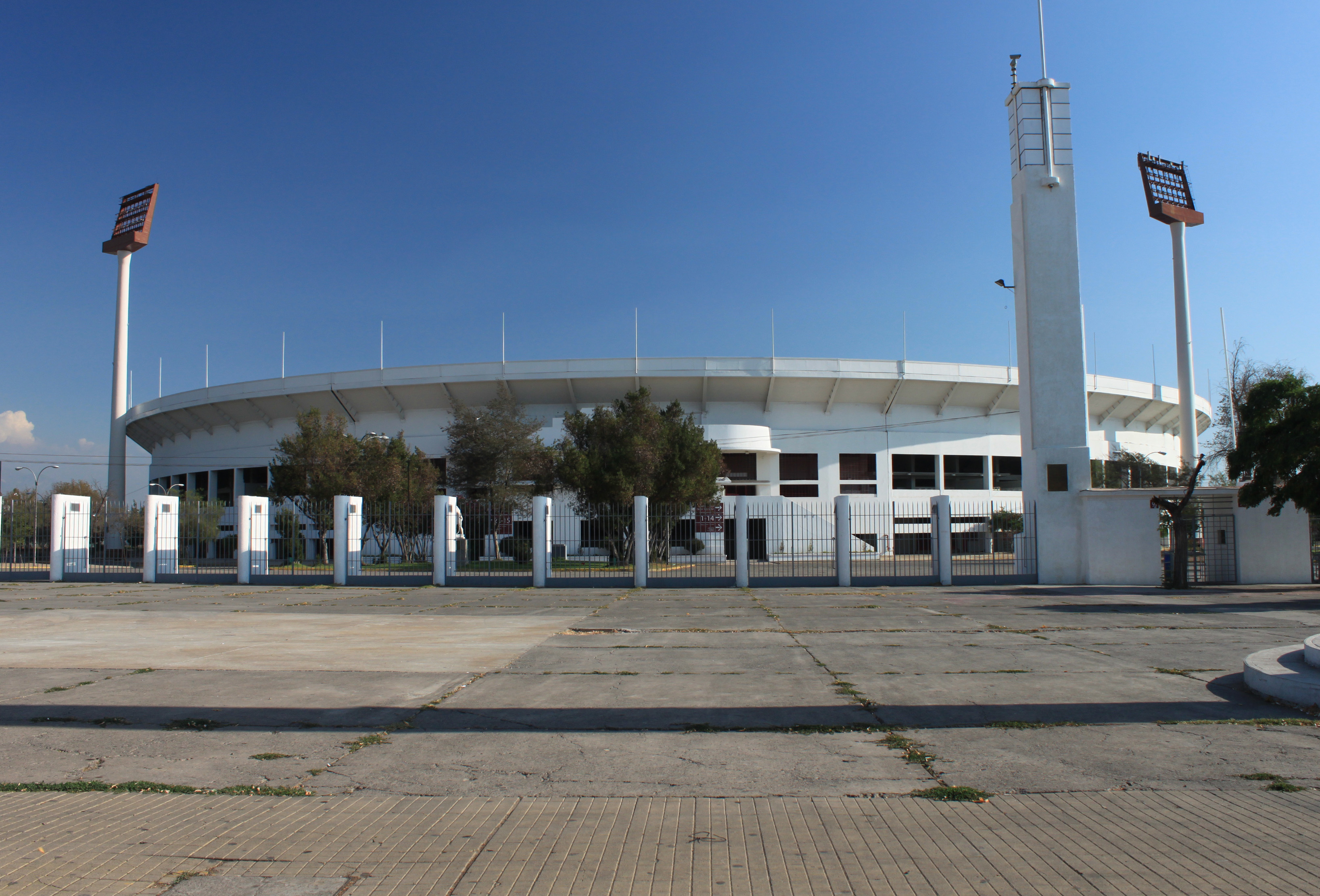
National Stadium.

The 1964 Campeonato Nacional de Fútbol Profesional, was the 32nd season of top-flight football in Chile. Universidad de Chile won their fourth title, also qualifying for the 1965 Copa de Campeones.

== League table ==
Pos	Team	Pld	W	D	L	GF	GA	GD	Pts	Qualification or relegation
1	Universidad de Chile	34	21	10	3	72	28	+44	52	Champions, qualified to the 1965 Copa de Campeones
2	Universidad Católica	34	18	7	9	78	50	+28	43	
3	Santiago Wanderers	34	17	9	8	55	37	+18	43	
4	Colo-Colo	34	18	4	12	75	52	+23	40	
5	Rangers	34	15	10	9	59	58	+1	40	
6	Unión Española	34	14	11	9	65	61	+4	39	
7	Deportes La Serena	34	14	9	11	56	55	+1	37	
8	Everton	34	14	7	13	67	56	+11	35	
9	Unión La Calera	34	13	9	12	49	52	−3	35	
10	Magallanes	34	12	10	12	55	51	+4	34	
11	Audax Italiano	34	10	12	12	50	51	−1	32	
12	Santiago Morning	34	11	7	16	53	64	−11	29	
13	Green Cross	34	11	6	17	36	52	−16	28	
14	Coquimbo Unido	34	7	12	15	36	50	−14	26	
15	Unión San Felipe	34	8	10	16	51	70	−19	26	
16	Palestino	34	10	5	19	44	68	−24	25	
17	San Luis	34	7	11	16	22	43	−21	25	
18	Ferrobádminton	34	9	5	20	44	69	−25	23	Relegated to the Segunda División

Primera División de Chile
1964 champion

4th title

== Results ==
Home \ Away	AUD	COL	COQ	EVE	FEB	GCR	DLS	MAG	PAL	RAN	USF	SLU	SMO	ULC	UES	UCA	UCH	SWA
Audax		3–3	2–0	1–2	4–0	3–0	1–1	1–2	2–1	0–1	1–1	0–2	0–0	2–0	1–2	1–1	0–0	2–0
Colo-Colo	0–3		1–1	3–0	2–0	2–0	1–2	2–0	5–0	7–3	7–1	1–2	2–1	1–2	3–0	2–3	1–2	1–0
Coquimbo	1–0	0–1		1–1	2–1	0–0	3–2	4–2	1–2	0–1	0–2	2–1	2–2	2–2	2–2	2–4	1–0	0–1
Everton	5–2	1–2	1–1		4–2	0–1	1–3	0–0	3–0	6–2	2–1	3–0	4–2	4–1	3–2	4–2	0–0	0–2
Ferrobádminton	3–5	2–4	1–0	2–0		1–2	2–1	1–0	0–0	2–2	1–3	1–2	1–1	4–1	0–3	0–2	0–3	1–3
Green Cross	2–2	4–2	2–1	1–0	3–4		2–1	1–0	1–1	1–3	3–2	0–1	0–2	0–3	1–1	4–1	0–4	0–1
La Serena	0–0	0–0	3–1	2–2	3–3	2–1		1–0	1–0	3–1	1–1	2–1	3–2	2–3	2–4	3–2	3–1	2–1
Magallanes	2–2	1–1	0–1	2–2	0–1	3–2	3–2		2–2	1–2	3–0	4–3	4–2	5–1	1–3	3–1	1–4	2–1
Palestino	1–2	3–2	1–0	3–2	1–2	2–1	1–2	1–4		1–1	5–2	2–1	2–1	1–4	0–1	1–2	0–2	2–5
Rangers	2–0	2–5	4–1	4–3	0–1	2–0	1–0	2–2	3–2		1–0	2–0	3–3	1–3	2–2	4–2	0–1	0–0
San Felipe	3–3	1–3	2–2	3–1	4–1	1–0	0–1	0–2	4–1	3–3		0–1	2–2	0–0	1–3	0–2	0–4	5–2
San Luis	0–2	1–2	0–0	0–3	2–0	0–0	1–1	0–0	0–3	0–0	0–0		0–0	1–3	0–0	2–3	0–0	0–3
S. Morning	1–0	4–3	3–1	1–3	2–1	2–1	3–0	3–4	2–0	1–1	0–2	2–0		1–0	0–3	1–3	1–2	1–4
La Calera	0–0	2–1	1–0	3–1	1–0	0–1	1–1	1–0	3–1	1–3	1–1	0–0	1–2		0–0	2–0	1–4	1–2
U. Española	5–3	4–0	2–1	1–3	2–2	2–0	3–3	1–1	3–1	0–3	3–2	0–1	3–1	2–2		1–5	2–3	1–1
U. Católica	1–1	1–2	2–2	2–1	2–1	0–0	3–1	2–0	1–1	5–0	7–2	0–0	4–1	4–2	6–2		0–0	1–2
U. de Chile	5–1	2–0	0–0	3–1	4–3	1–2	5–2	0–0	3–1	2–0	1–1	2–0	3–2	2–2	5–0	1–0		2–2
S. Wanderers	4–0	0–3	1–1	1–1	1–0	2–0	1–0	1–1	0–1	0–0	3–0	2–0	2–1	3–1	2–2	1–4	1–1	

Legend: Blue = home team win; Yellow = draw; Red = away team win.

== Topscorer ==
Name	Team	Goals
(Chile) Daniel Escudero	Everton	25
