= 1965 Campeonato Nacional Primera División =

Campeonato Nacional de Fútbol Profesional
- Dates: 3 April 1965 – 27 February 1966
- Champions: Universidad de Chile (5th title)
- Relegated: Coquimbo Unido
- 1966 Copa Libertadores: Universidad de Chile; Universidad Católica
- Matches: 306
- Goals: 1,027 (3.36 per match)
- Top goalscorer: Héctor Scandolli (25)
- Biggest home win: Unión Española 8–1 Magallanes (22 January 1966)
- Highest attendance: 74,522 Universidad Católica 0–0 Universidad de Chile (18 September 1965)
- Total attendance: 3,046,357
- Average attendance: 9,955

The 1965 Campeonato Nacional de Fútbol Profesional, was the 33rd season of top-flight football in Chile. Universidad de Chile won their fifth title, also qualifying for the 1966 Copa Libertadores.

== League table ==
Pos	Team	Pld	W	D	L	GF	GA	GD	Pts	Qualification or relegation
1	Universidad de Chile	34	25	7	2	86	36	+50	57	Champions, qualified to the 1966 Copa Libertadores
2	Universidad Católica	34	21	9	4	71	39	+32	51	Qualified to the 1966 Copa Libertadores
3	Rangers	34	18	8	8	76	63	+13	44	
4	Palestino	34	16	11	7	70	42	+28	43	
5	Everton	34	17	7	10	76	52	+24	41	
6	Green Cross Temuco	34	14	7	13	51	46	+5	35	
7	Colo-Colo	34	11	12	11	65	55	+10	34	
8	Audax Italiano	34	12	10	12	43	39	+4	34	
9	Deportes La Serena	34	12	10	12	57	59	−2	34	
10	Santiago Wanderers	34	13	7	14	55	54	+1	33	
11	O'Higgins	34	11	11	12	49	53	−4	33	
12	Unión Española	34	12	7	15	74	66	+8	31	
13	Magallanes	34	11	9	14	41	57	−16	31	
14	Unión San Felipe	34	13	3	18	59	86	−27	29	
15	Santiago Morning	34	4	18	12	43	59	−16	26	
16	San Luis	34	5	13	16	46	67	−21	23	
17	Unión La Calera	34	8	7	19	41	73	−32	23	
18	Coquimbo Unido	34	1	8	25	24	81	−57	10	Relegated to the Segunda División

Primera División de Chile
1965 champions
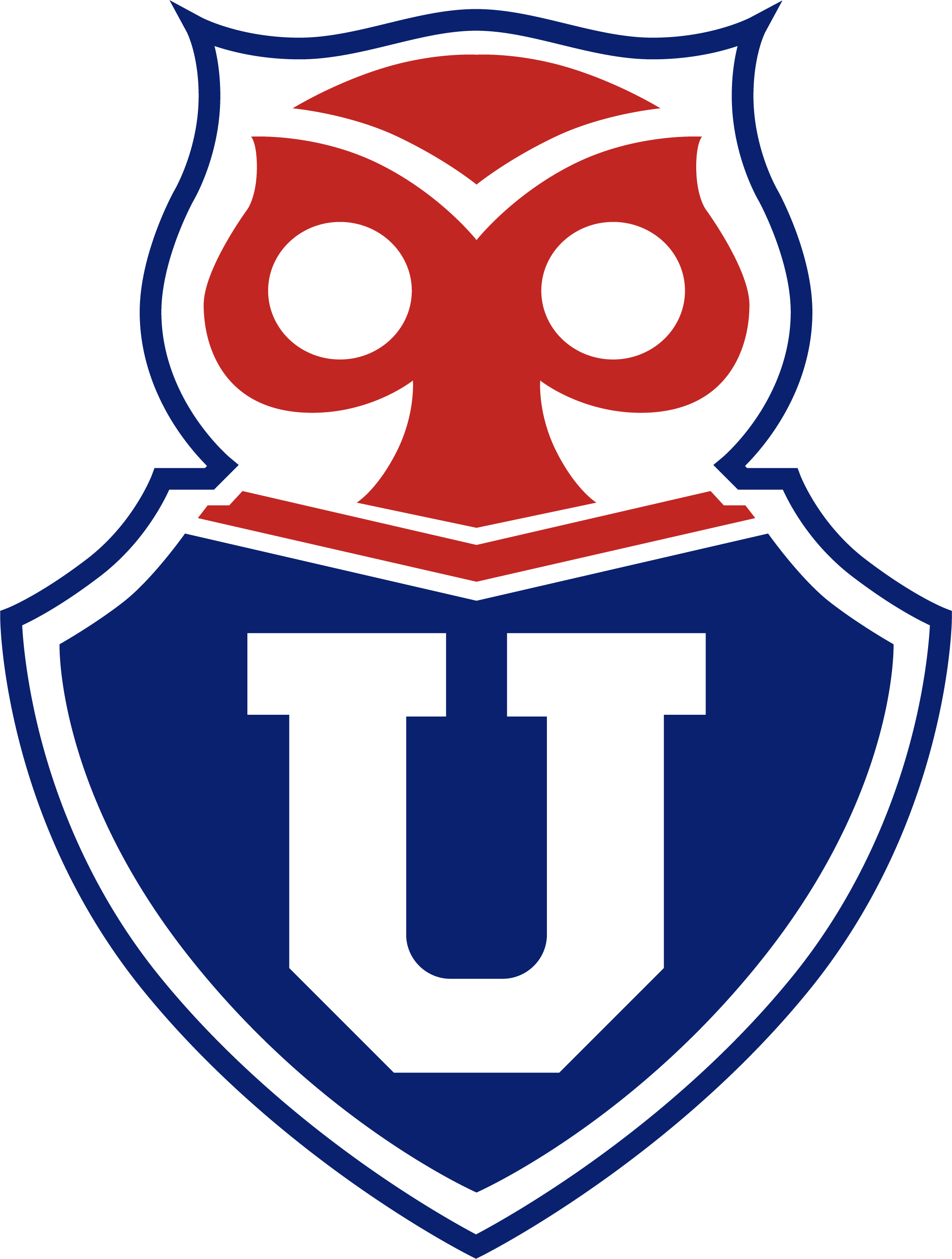
Universidad de Chile
5th title

== Results ==
Home \ Away	AUD	COL	COQ	EVE	GCT	DLS	MAG	OHI	PAL	RAN	USF	SLU	SMO	ULC	UES	UCA	UCH	SWA
Audax		3–1	1–1	2–1	1–0	2–2	1–2	1–1	1–1	1–1	0–1	1–1	1–0	0–0	2–1	1–1	0–3	2–0
Colo-Colo	3–1		3–0	1–1	0–3	6–1	1–1	2–0	1–1	5–0	1–2	3–3	1–1	3–1	1–1	1–1	1–3	1–3
Coquimbo	1–3	1–1		1–5	2–1	0–1	1–1	0–1	1–1	1–3	3–5	0–0	0–0	1–2	1–2	0–1	0–4	0–1
Everton	2–1	5–4	3–0		3–2	1–0	1–2	3–0	1–0	2–2	4–1	2–0	1–1	1–1	6–2	0–0	2–5	2–0
Green Cross T.	3–1	1–2	3–1	0–4		3–1	2–0	2–2	1–2	1–1	3–0	2–0	2–0	5–1	0–3	1–1	1–3	2–1
La Serena	2–0	1–1	3–0	2–1	5–0		2–0	2–1	1–2	3–4	3–2	2–1	1–1	1–1	2–1	0–3	1–1	2–2
Magallanes	1–0	0–0	3–0	4–3	0–3	0–3		1–1	1–1	4–3	0–1	0–0	2–1	3–0	2–2	0–1	1–2	2–1
O'Higgins	0–3	2–1	1–1	0–3	1–0	0–0	1–2		1–1	1–3	4–1	1–0	0–0	2–1	0–1	4–2	1–2	5–1
Palestino	1–1	4–1	2–1	3–3	1–2	4–3	2–2	0–1		4–0	5–0	7–1	4–1	3–2	2–0	1–3	2–0	3–1
Rangers	2–0	2–1	5–2	4–3	1–1	4–2	2–0	3–1	1–1		3–2	2–2	3–2	2–0	3–0	2–1	2–3	2–1
San Felipe	1–3	1–4	2–0	2–1	3–0	1–1	2–1	3–3	2–1	4–3		4–2	2–2	4–1	4–1	0–3	2–3	3–5
San Luis	0–0	1–1	4–2	0–1	0–1	2–1	1–1	2–2	1–2	5–2	3–0		1–1	0–2	3–3	0–3	2–0	3–3
S. Morning	0–2	0–1	0–0	2–2	0–0	3–3	0–1	0–4	2–2	2–3	2–0	2–2		1–0	3–1	2–1	3–3	0–3
La Calera	2–1	1–1	3–1	1–2	3–2	2–3	3–1	0–0	0–2	3–3	2–1	3–1	3–3		0–5	1–2	0–3	1–3
U. Española	0–3	2–4	4–0	4–2	0–0	1–1	8–1	2–3	2–2	0–2	6–0	4–0	5–3	3–1		2–4	1–3	1–1
U. Católica	3–1	2–5	4–1	2–1	1–1	4–2	2–1	5–2	2–1	2–1	3–1	4–3	2–2	3–0	2–1		0–0	2–0
U. de Chile	1–0	4–3	5–0	3–1	2–1	1–0	5–1	3–1	2–1	1–1	6–0	2–1	2–2	3–0	5–3	0–0		2–2
S. Wanderers	0–3	2–0	3–1	0–3	0–2	4–0	1–0	2–2	0–1	2–1	4–2	3–1	1–1	4–0	0–2	1–1	0–1	

Legend: Blue = home team win; Yellow = draw; Red = away team win.

== Topscorer ==
Name	Team	Goals
(Argentina) Héctor Scandolli	Rangers	25
