= Luis Álamos =

Chilean football manager

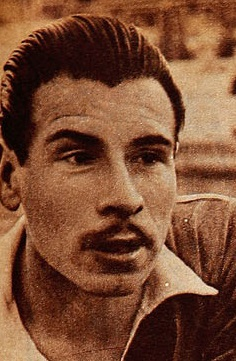

Personal information
- Full name: Luis Álamos Luque
- Date of birth: 25 December 1923
- Place of birth: Chañaral, Chile
- Date of death: 26 June 1983 (aged 59)
- Place of death: Santiago, Chile
- Position: Midfielder

Senior career*
Years	Team	Apps	(Gls)
- Universidad de Chile

Managerial career
- 1954: Universidad de Chile
- 1956–1958: Universidad de Chile (youth)
- 1958–1966: Universidad de Chile
- 1966: Chile
- 1967–1969: Audax Italiano
- 1970: Lota Schwager
- 1971: Santiago Wanderers
- 1972–1975: Colo Colo
- 1973–1974: Chile
- 1976–1977: Santiago Morning
- 1978: Coquimbo Unido
- 1978: Unión Española
- 1979: Santiago Wanderers
- * Club domestic league appearances and goals

Luis "El Zorro" Álamos Luque (25 December 1923 – 26 June 1983) was a football manager from Chile.

== Career ==
He had a career as a forward with Universidad de Chile with Luis Tirado as coach, but Alejandro Scopelli turned him into a midfielder.

Álamos guided the national team at the 1966 and 1974 FIFA World Cups but was unable to advance from the group stage on both the occasions. Álamos was also the manager of the Chilean team Colo-Colo for four seasons (1972–1975) and for Universidad de Chile.
