= 1966 Campeonato Nacional Primera División =

Campeonato Nacional de Fútbol Profesional
- Dates: 7 May 1966 – 15 January 1967
- Champions: Universidad Católica (4th title)
- Relegated: Ferrobádminton
- 1967 Copa Libertadores: Universidad Católica; Colo-Colo
- Matches: 306
- Goals: 933 (3.05 per match)
- Top goalscorer: Carlos Campos (21); Felipe Bracamonte (21)
- Biggest home win: Universidad de Chile 8–1 Unión San Felipe (11 September)
- Highest attendance: 77,890 Universidad Católica 3–5 Universidad de Chile (11 January 1967)
- Total attendance: 2,751,770
- Average attendance: 8,992

The 1966 Campeonato Nacional de Fútbol Profesional, was the 34th season of top-flight football in Chile. Universidad Católica won their fourth title following a 4–2 win against Unión San Felipe on the 32nd matchday, also qualifying for the 1967 Copa Libertadores.

== League table ==
Pos	Team	Pld	W	D	L	GF	GA	GD	Pts	Qualification or relegation
1	Universidad Católica	34	20	8	6	70	34	+36	48	Champions, qualified to the 1967 Copa Libertadores
2	Colo-Colo	34	17	10	7	63	42	+21	44	Qualified to the 1967 Copa Libertadores
3	Santiago Wanderers	34	16	11	7	46	33	+13	43	
4	Universidad de Chile	34	18	6	10	79	49	+30	42	
5	Palestino	34	14	10	10	52	40	+12	38	
6	Magallanes	34	14	10	10	46	48	−2	38	
7	Deportes La Serena	34	12	12	10	46	42	+4	36	
8	Green Cross Temuco	34	12	11	11	64	52	+12	35	
9	O'Higgins	34	12	11	11	43	48	−5	35	
10	Unión La Calera	34	12	7	15	45	60	−15	31	
11	Rangers	34	10	10	14	65	65	0	30	
12	Audax Italiano	34	9	12	13	52	56	−4	30	
13	Everton	34	12	6	16	47	57	−10	30	
14	Unión San Felipe	34	11	7	16	57	65	−8	29	
15	Unión Española	34	9	10	15	37	46	−9	28	
16	San Luis	34	8	12	14	35	49	−14	28	
17	Santiago Morning	34	8	8	18	41	69	−28	24	
18	Ferrobádminton	34	8	7	19	45	78	−33	23	Relegated to Segunda División

Primera División de Chile
1966 champions
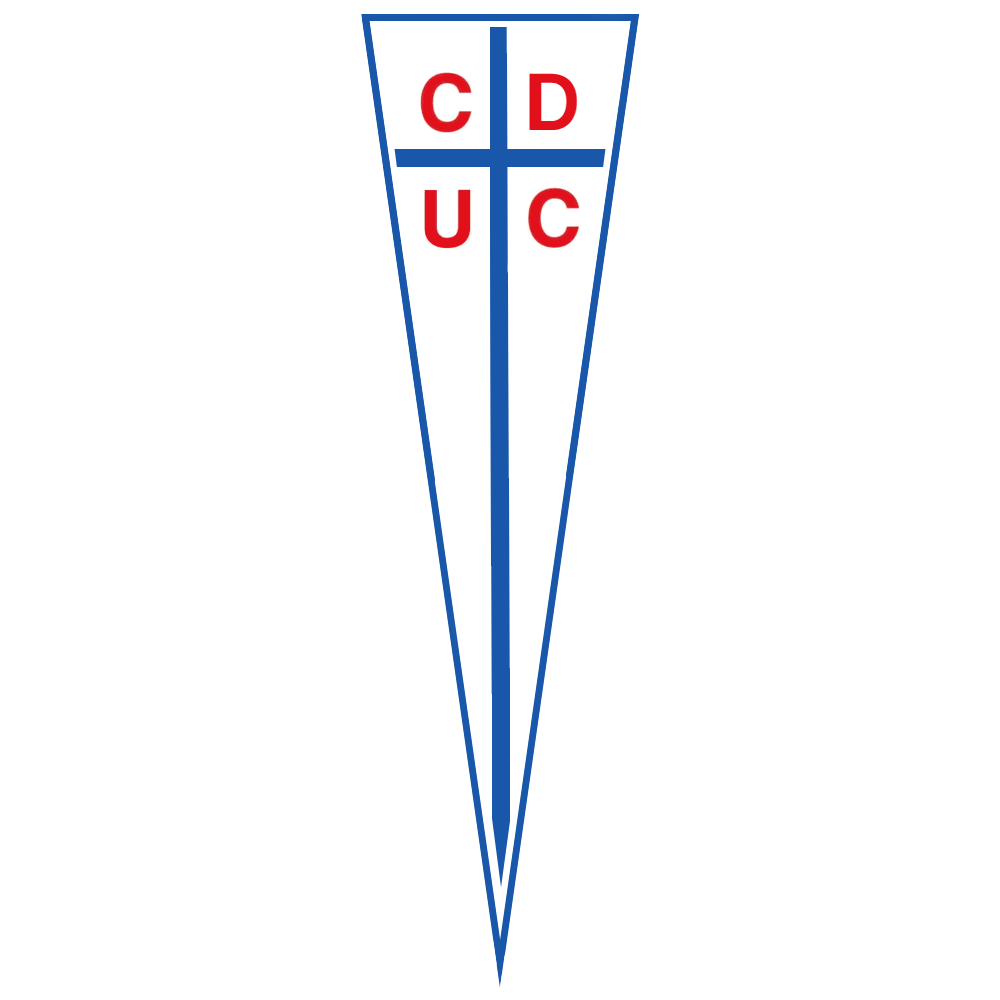
Universidad Católica
4th title

== Results ==
Home \ Away	AUD	COL	EVE	FEB	GCT	DLS	MAG	OHI	PAL	RAN	USF	SLU	SMO	ULC	UES	UCA	UCH	SWA
Audax		2–4	2–1	0–0	2–3	2–0	3–0	2–0	0–0	4–1	1–4	2–1	1–1	1–1	0–0	2–2	3–2	0–4
Colo-Colo	2–1		1–1	5–2	2–1	3–1	0–0	1–2	1–3	4–2	0–0	3–1	2–0	4–2	0–0	1–3	3–1	2–1
Everton	2–2	1–0		2–1	0–2	1–1	4–2	2–0	0–2	1–0	1–3	1–2	2–3	0–1	1–1	0–4	1–0	1–2
Ferrobádminton	2–1	1–6	2–1		3–2	1–1	4–1	2–2	2–2	1–7	1–2	1–0	1–3	1–1	3–0	0–1	0–3	3–4
Green Cross T.	1–1	1–1	2–0	5–0		2–4	2–0	4–1	2–2	3–3	3–2	1–1	2–3	0–1	0–0	3–2	2–2	0–0
La Serena	1–1	1–0	0–1	5–2	1–0		0–0	1–0	1–1	1–1	2–0	4–1	0–0	5–1	2–1	0–0	2–4	0–2
Magallanes	2–2	3–3	4–3	1–0	2–4	2–1		2–0	1–0	2–2	1–1	1–0	1–0	2–1	2–1	2–1	1–0	3–1
O'Higgins	2–3	0–0	2–1	2–1	1–0	4–1	1–0		0–1	2–2	4–1	0–0	1–0	3–2	0–1	1–3	2–1	0–0
Palestino	3–2	1–2	2–3	3–0	1–1	1–1	1–2	1–1		2–1	1–1	1–0	4–0	3–2	1–0	1–0	3–0	0–1
Rangers	3–3	1–3	1–1	5–2	1–2	0–1	0–1	2–2	3–1		3–1	0–0	3–2	7–1	3–2	2–0	1–1	1–1
San Felipe	3–1	2–3	1–2	0–1	6–3	4–3	1–1	1–1	2–1	1–0		3–1	7–0	2–3	0–2	2–4	1–2	0–0
San Luis	1–0	1–1	0–1	3–2	3–2	1–1	0–0	1–1	2–1	1–0	3–1		1–1	0–1	2–2	1–2	1–1	1–3
S. Morning	3–1	1–1	1–3	2–0	2–2	0–0	0–3	1–1	1–0	1–2	1–1	2–5		1–2	5–1	0–7	1–2	0–2
La Calera	1–5	1–3	2–3	1–1	1–1	1–0	3–2	2–0	1–2	4–3	0–1	1–0	1–2		0–0	0–0	2–3	2–0
U. Española	2–0	1–2	3–1	3–2	0–3	0–1	0–0	2–3	3–1	0–1	3–2	0–0	3–1	0–1		1–3	2–0	1–3
U. Católica	1–1	2–0	3–2	2–1	2–1	3–1	3–0	0–2	1–1	4–1	4–0	2–0	3–2	2–0	0–0		3–5	2–0
U. de Chile	2–1	2–0	4–2	2–0	1–0	1–1	4–2	6–1	1–3	6–2	8–1	6–0	2–0	1–1	3–2	1–1		1–2
S. Wanderers	1–0	0–0	1–1	0–1	1–4	1–2	1–0	1–1	2–2	4–1	1–0	1–1	2–1	2–1	0–0	0–0	2–1	

Legend: Blue = home team win; Yellow = draw; Red = away team win.

== Topscorer ==
Name	Team	Goals
(Argentina) Felipe Bracamonte	Unión San Felipe	21
(Chile) Carlos Campos	Universidad de Chile	21
