= César Vaccia =

Chilean football manager (born 1952)

Personal information
- Full name: César Pablo Vaccia Izami
- Date of birth: 10 December 1952 (age 73)
- Place of birth: San Antonio, Chile
- Height: 1.70 m (5 ft 7 in)

Senior career*
Years	Team	Apps	(Gls)
- San Antonio Unido
- Audax Italiano

Managerial career
- 1983: San Antonio Unido
- 1984: San Antonio Atlético
- 1986–1999: Universidad de Chile (youth)
- 1999–2001: Universidad de Chile
- 2002: Chile
- 2002–2003: Chile U17
- 2007: Chile U15
- 2008–2009: Chile U17
- 2009–2010: Chile U23
- 2010–2011: Chile U20
- * Club domestic league appearances and goals

César Pablo Vaccia Izami (born 10 December 1952) is a Chilean football manager and former player.

== Career ==
As a footballer, he played for San Antonio Unido and Audax Italiano.

He is well known in his country for reach two consecutive league titles and a cup title with Universidad de Chile between 1999 and 2001 as well as his spells as Chilean football team coach in its U-17, U-20 and U-23 categories.

== Honours ==
=== Manager ===
Universidad de Chile

- Primera División de Chile: 1999, 2000
- Copa Chile: 2000
