= Luis Tirado =

Chilean football manager (1906–1964)

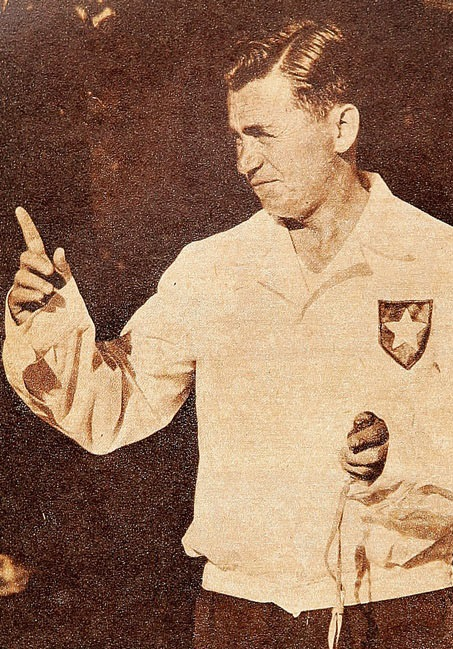
- Luis Tirado, Estadio

Personal information
- Full name: Luis Norberto Tirado Gordillo
- Date of birth: 4 April 1906
- Place of birth: Copiapó, Chile
- Date of death: 24 November 1964 (aged 58)
- Place of death: San Bernardo, Chile
- Height: 1.70 m (5 ft 7 in)
- Position: Centre-half

Senior career*
Years	Team	Apps	(Gls)
1920	Tocopilla (city team)		
1927	Colo-Colo		
- Santiago National
1931	Magallanes		
1935–1936	Universidad de Chile		
1938	Universidad de Chile	1	(0)

Managerial career
- 1931: Magallanes
- 1932–1935: Unión Española
- 1938–1941: Universidad de Chile
- 1944–1946: Colo-Colo
- 1946–1949: Universidad de Chile
- 1946–1949: Chile
- 1951: Colo-Colo
- 1952–1953: Chile
- 1953: Palestino
- 1954–1956: Chile
- 1955: Universidad de Chile
- 1956–1958: Sporting Cristal
- 1958: San Luis
- 1959: Audax Italiano
- 1960–1963: Deportes Temuco
- 1964: Unión San Felipe
- * Club domestic league appearances and goals

Luis Norberto Tirado Gordillo (born 4 April 1906 — 24 November 1964) was a Chilean footballer and manager.

== Career ==
Born in Copiapó, Chile, he represented the Tocopilla team at the age of 14. Later, he played for Colo-Colo, Santiago National, Magallanes and Universidad de Chile.

He coached three Chile national teams and Universidad de Chile as well as Colo-Colo two times. Outside of Chile, he coached Sporting Cristal from 1956 to 1958.

== Personal life ==
In 1926, he graduated as a primary school teacher. In addition, he spent time making conferences and sport talks.

At the same time he was a player of Universidad de Chile, he graduated as a PE teacher at the namesake university.

== Honours ==
=== Manager ===
Universidad de Chile

- Primera División de Chile (1): 1940

Colo-Colo

- Primera División de Chile (1): 1945

Sporting Cristal

- Primera División de Peru (1): 1956

San Luis de Quillota

- Segunda División de Chile (1): 1958
