= Pedro Morales Torres =

Chilean football manager (1932–2000)

Pedro Morales
Personal information
- Full name: Pedro Morales Torres
- Date of birth: 8 August 1932
- Place of birth: La Serena, Chile
- Date of death: 13 September 2000 (aged 68)
- Place of death: Santiago, Chile
- Height: 1.73 m (5 ft 8 in)

Senior career*
Years	Team	Apps	(Gls)
- Deportes La Serena

Managerial career
- 1960–1967: Colo-Colo (youth)
- 1966: Colo-Colo (interim)
- 1967: Colo-Colo
- 1968: Deportes La Serena
- 1968–1969: San Antonio Unido
- 1970: Huachipato (youth)
- 1971: Ñublense
- 1972–1975: Huachipato
- 1973–1974: Chile (assistant)
- 1974–1975: Chile
- 1976–1978: Everton
- 1979–1980: Colo-Colo
- 1981: Universidad Católica
- 1982: Audax Italiano
- 1983: Santiago Wanderers
- 1984: Chile Olympic
- 1985: Chile
- 1985: Chile XI
- 1985: Chile A-2
- 1990-1991: Universidad de Chile
- * Club domestic league appearances and goals

Pedro Morales Torres (8 August 1932 – 13 September 2000) was a Chilean football manager.

A journeyman in Chilean management, he managed a multitude of Chilean clubs, including Huachipato, Everton, Colo-Colo, among others. He also coached several national Chile teams, including the Chile Olympic team at the 1984 Summer Olympics and the Chile national team at the 1986 FIFA World Cup Qualifications. He also managed the Chile B-team at the Indonesian Independence Cup and the Los Angeles Nations Cup.

== Honours ==
Huachipato

- Chilean Primera División: 1974

Everton

- Chilean Primera División: 1976

Colo-Colo

- Chilean Primera División: 1979
