= Daniel Escudero =

Chilean footballer (1941–2021)

Personal information
- Full name: Daniel Escudero Pizarro
- Date of birth: 18 December 1941
- Place of birth: Viña del Mar, Chile
- Date of death: 20 July 2021 (aged 79)
- Height: 1.75 m (5 ft 9 in)
- Position: Forward

Senior career*
| Years | Team | Apps | (Gls) |
| 1959–1972 | Everton | 266 | (123) |
| 1967 | → Unión La Calera (loan) | 12 | (1) |
| 1973 | San Luis | | |

International career
| 1959 | Chile U20 | | |
| 1965 | Chile | | |
- * Club domestic league appearances and goals

Daniel Escudero Pizarro (29 December 1941 – 20 July 2021) was a Chilean footballer who played as a forward.

== Career ==
He is the top goalscorer in the history of Everton de Viña del Mar.

Escudero also had brief stints with Unión La Calera in 1967 and San Luis de Quillota in 1973.

Escudero was part of the Chile national youth team in 1959. Regularly called up to the Chile senior team, he made an appearance in the 1–3 win against Alianza Lima on 6 October 1965.

== Honours ==
- Primera División de Chile Top-Scorer: 1964
