= Juan Zárate =

Argentine footballer

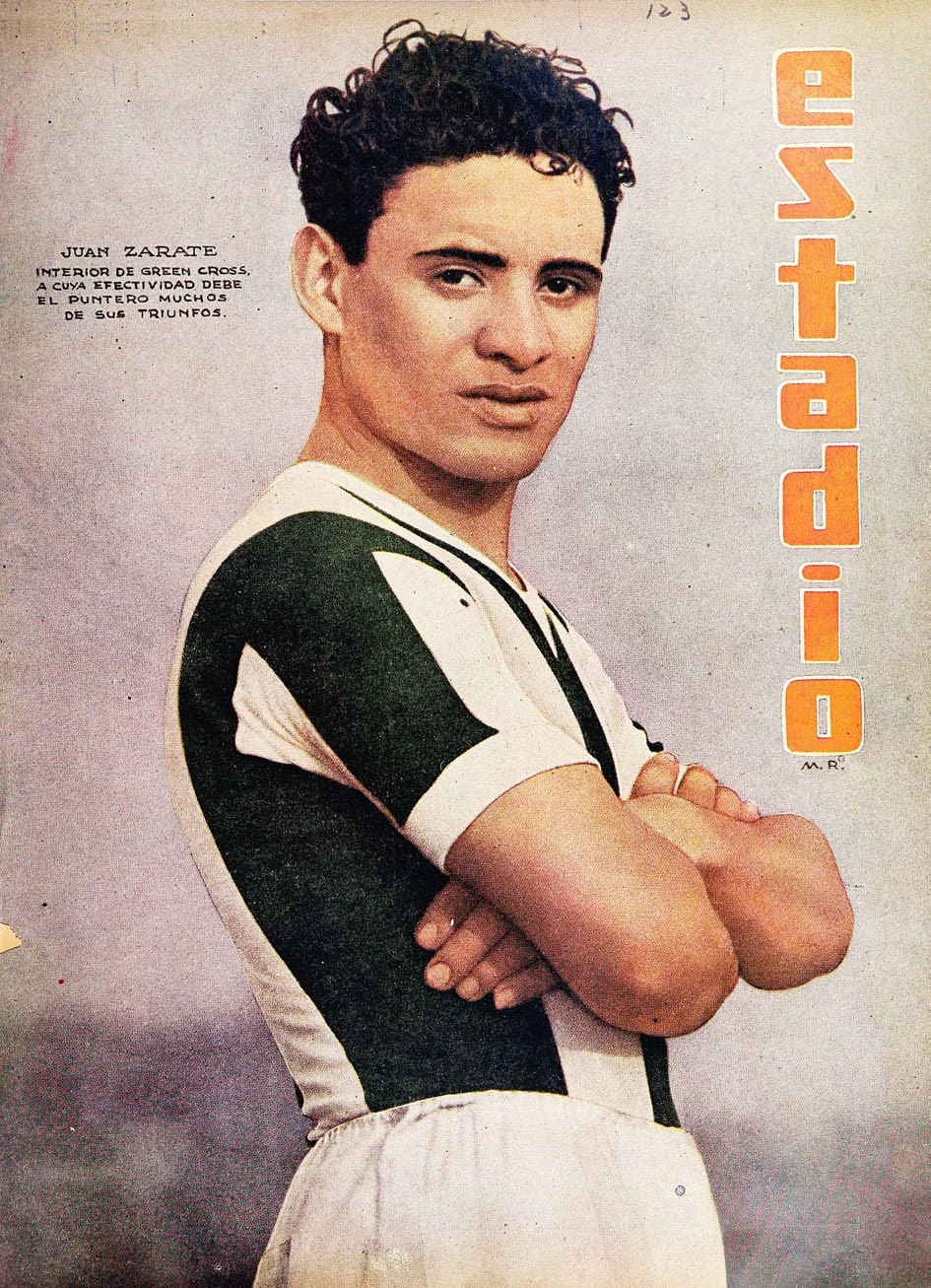
- Zárate with Green Cross in 1945.

Personal information
- Full name: Juan Zárate Iglesias
- Place of birth: Argentina
- Position: Forward

Youth career
- General Paz
- Chacarita Juniors
- Ferro Carril Oeste

Senior career*
Years	Team	Apps	(Gls)
1943	River Plate		
1944	Nacional Vélez Sarsfield Pacífico		
1945–1946	Green Cross	101	(66)
1947–1950	Audax Italiano	55	(38)
1951	Santiago Wanderers		
1952–1954	Unión Española		
1955–1957	Ferrobádminton		

Managerial career
- 1979–1992: Cobresal (youth)
- 1979: Cobresal
- 1981: Cobresal
- 1990–1991: Cobresal (assistant)
- 1991–1992: Cobresal
- * Club domestic league appearances and goals

Juan Zárate Iglesias was an Argentine footballer.

== Career ==
As a youth player, Zárate was with General Paz from Villa Devoto, Chacarita Juniors and Ferro Carril Oeste. In his homeland, he played for the reserve team of River Plate and Nacional Vélez Sarsfield Pacífico before moving to Chile.

In Chile, he played for Green Cross, becoming a historical player, Audax Italiano, Santiago Wanderers, Unión Española and Ferrobádminton.

In Chilean football, he scored 104 goals in 156 games.

As a football coach, he worked in the Cobresal youth ranks since the foundation of the club in 1979, leading the senior team in the same year and stints in both the second and the first division of the Chilean football. As coach of the youth ranks, he took part in the training and promotion to the first team of the successful Chile international Iván Zamorano.

== Honours ==
=== Club ===
Audax Italiano

- Campeonato Nacional (Chile): 1948

=== Individual ===
- Campeonato Nacional (Chile) Top-Scorer (2): 1945, 1948
