= Héctor Scandolli =

Argentine footballer

Héctor Scandolli (born in Buenos Aires, Argentina) is an Argentine former footballer who played as a forward for Clubs of Argentina and Chile.

== Teams ==
- River Plate 1957–1958
- Estudiantes de La Plata 1959–1964
- Rangers 1965–1970
