= Aurelio Domínguez =

Chilean footballer

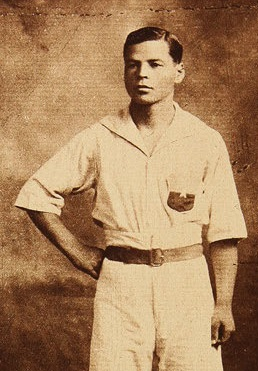

Personal information
- Full name: Aurelio Domínguez Correa
- Position: Forward

Senior career*
Years	Team	Apps	(Gls)
- Colo-Colo

International career
1919–1924	Chile	14	(1)
- * Club domestic league appearances and goals as of 7 December 2015

Aurelio Domínguez Correa was a Chilean footballer.

== Football career ==
He began play at Artillero de Costa from Talcahuano and for the Chile national football team which he participated at the 1920, 1922 and 1924 South American Championships. His first international goal was in a 2–1 loss with Uruguay in 1920.

In 1930s he played for Colo-Colo and in 1935 he was top-scorer of the Campeonato Nacional alongside Magallanes’s player Guillermo Ogaz.

== Honours ==
=== Individual ===
- Campeonato Nacional (Chile) Top-Scorer: 1935
