= Luis Carvallo =

Chilean footballer

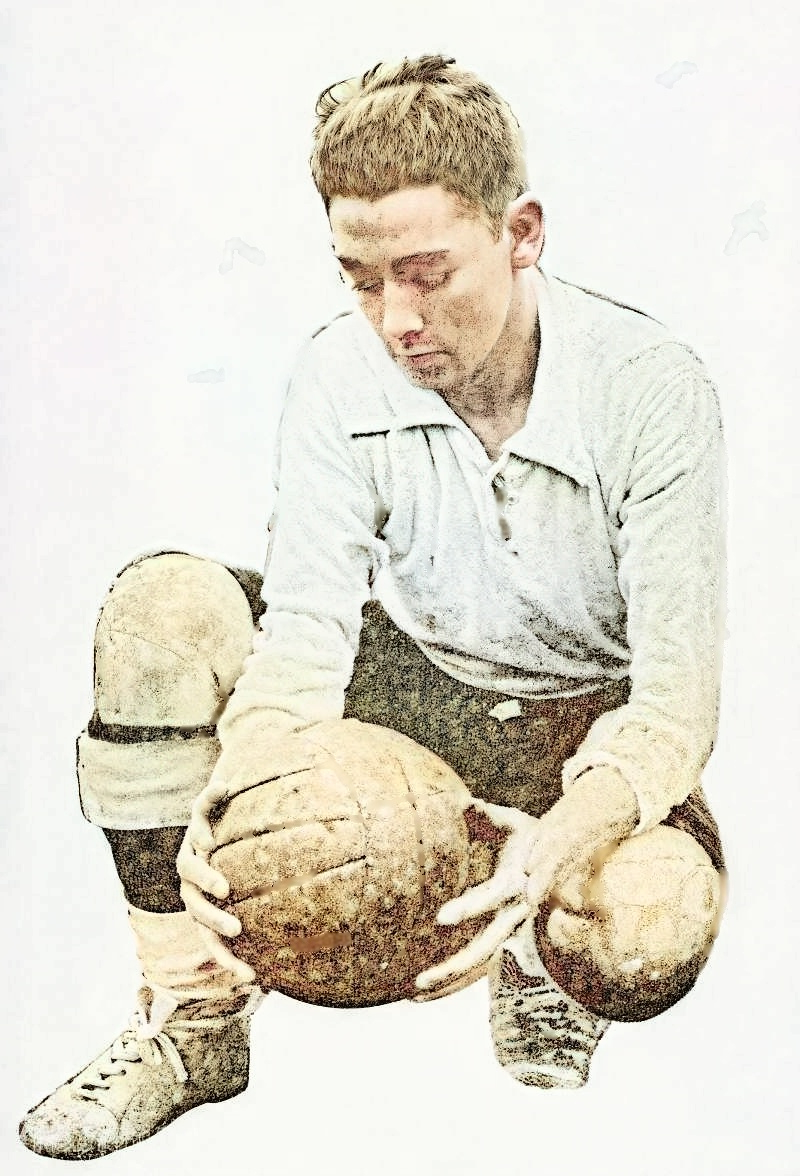

Personal information
- Full name: Luis Carvallo
- Position: Forward

Senior career*
Years	Team	Apps	(Gls)
- Colo-Colo
- * Club domestic league appearances and goals as of 7 December 2015

Luis Carvallo was a Chilean footballer.

He was the first top scorer in Chilean first tier tournaments.

== Honours ==
=== Club ===
- Campeonato Nacional (Chile) Top-Scorer: 1933
