= Hugo Giorgi =

Argentine footballer

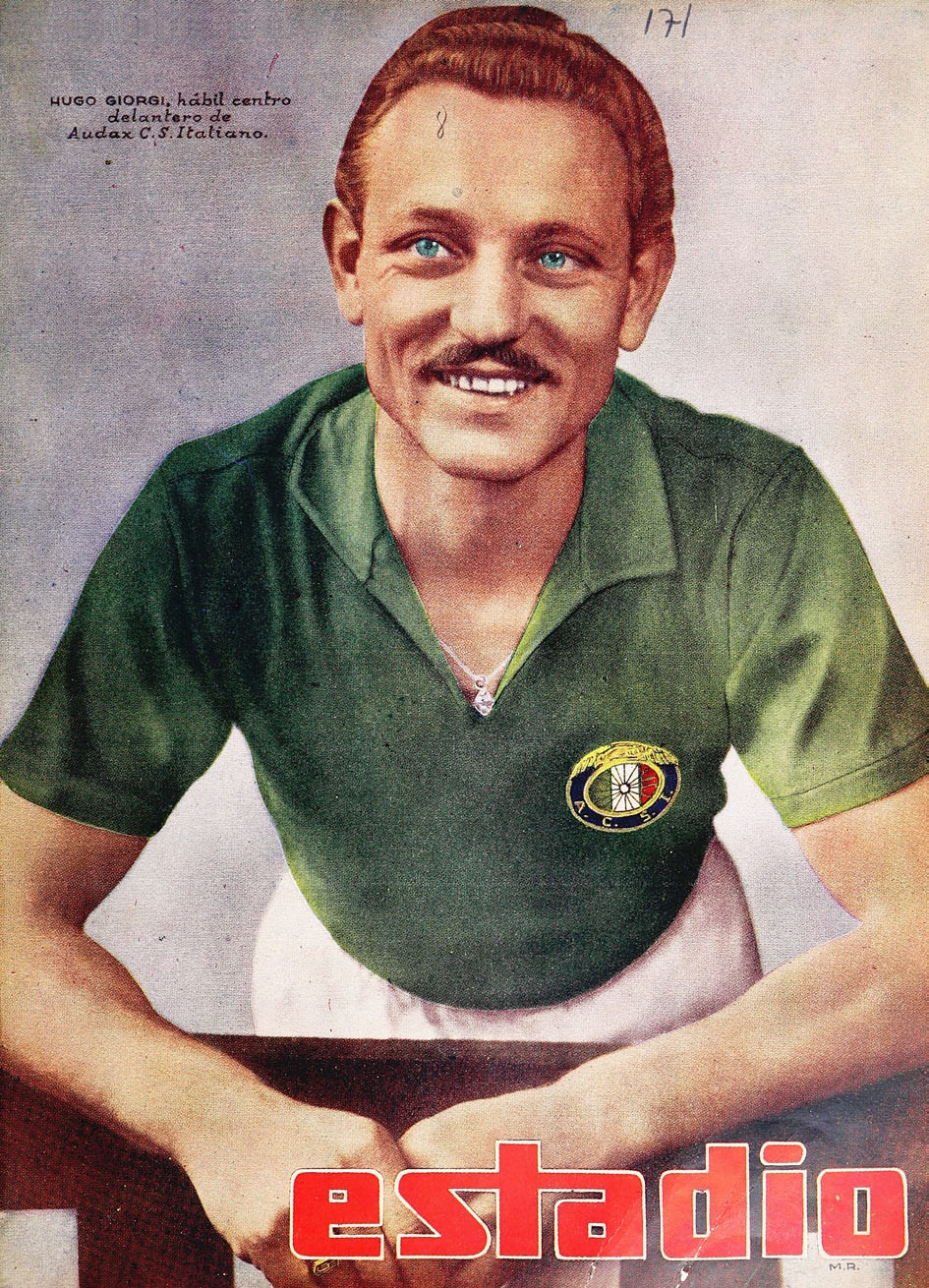

Hugo Giorgi (born 23 January 1920) is an Argentine former footballer who played as a forward for clubs in Chile and Italy. He was born in Coronel Bogado.

== Clubs ==
- Audax Italiano 1940–1947
- Bologna 1947–1949

== Honours ==
Audax Italiano

- Chilean championship: 1946

Individual

- Chilean championship top scorer: 1945
