= Felipe Bracamonte =

Argentine footballer

Personal information
- Full name: Felipe Dionisio Bracamonte
- Place of birth: Buenos Aires, Argentina
- Date of death: 4 January 2005
- Position: Forward

Senior career*
Years	Team	Apps	(Gls)
1957–1960	Estudiantes de La Plata	43	(18)
1960	All Boys	5	(2)
1961–1965	Quilmes	25	(14)
1966–1970	Unión San Felipe	33	(21)
Total		106	(55)
- * Club domestic league appearances and goals

Felipe Dionisio Bracamonte (born in Buenos Aires, Argentina, died 4 January 2005) was an Argentine footballer who played as a forward for clubs of Argentina and Chile.

== Honours ==
- Unión San Felipe 1966 (top scorer Chilean Championship)
