= Ubaldo Cruche =

Uruguayan footballer (1920–1988)

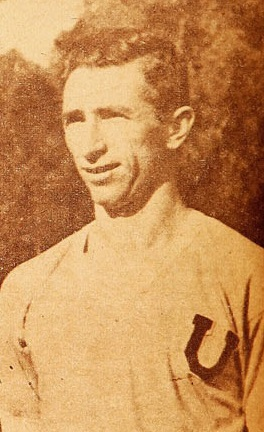
- Cruche with Universidad de Chile in 1945

Personal information
- Date of birth: May 25, 1920
- Place of birth: Montevideo, Uruguay
- Date of death: 1988 (aged 67–68)
- Position: Forward

Senior career*
Years	Team	Apps	(Gls)
1938–1944	Peñarol		
1945–1948	Universidad de Chile	48	(43)

International career
1941	Uruguay	2	(1)
- * Club domestic league appearances and goals

Ubaldo Cruche (May 25, 1920 – 1988) was a Uruguayan footballer who played as a forward for clubs in both Uruguay and Chile as well as for the Uruguay national team in the Copa América 1941. He was born in Montevideo in May 1920 and died in 1988.

== Career ==
- Peñarol 1938–1944
- Universidad de Chile 1945–1948

During his stint with Universidad de Chile, Cruche scored 44 goals in 48 appearances.

== Honours ==
Peñarol

- Uruguayan Championship: 1938

Individual

- Chilean Championship top scorer: 1945, 1946
