= 1976 Campeonato Nacional Primera División =

Campeonato Nacional 1976
- Dates: 4 April 1976 – 27 November 1976
- Champions: Everton (3rd title)
- Relegated: Deportes La Serena; Naval; Rangers (Promotion Lig.)
- 1977 Copa Libertadores: Everton; Universidad de Chile
- Matches: 308
- Goals: 968 (3.14 per match)
- Top goalscorer: Oscar Fabbiani (23 goals)
- Biggest home win: Regional Antofagasta 7–1 Rangers (4 April); Deportes Concepción 7–1 Santiago Morning (8 August)
- Highest attendance: 69,526 Colo-Colo 2–1 Universidad de Chile (4 July)
- Total attendance: 2,120,784
- Average attendance: 6,931

The 1976 Campeonato Nacional de Fútbol Profesional was Chilean top tier's 44th season. Everton was the tournament's champion, winning its third title.

== Standings ==
Pos	Team	Pld	W	D	L	GF	GA	GD	Pts	Qualification or relegation
1	Unión Española	34	21	11	2	69	28	+41	53	Qualified to Championship play-off
2	Everton	34	22	9	3	77	44	+33	53	Qualified to Championship play-off
3	Universidad de Chile	34	17	11	6	70	41	+29	45	Qualified to Liguilla Pre-Libertadores
4	Colo-Colo	34	16	12	6	57	36	+21	44	Qualified to Liguilla Pre-Libertadores
5	Palestino	34	16	10	8	67	53	+14	42	Qualified to Liguilla Pre-Libertadores
6	Green Cross Temuco	34	16	9	9	57	38	+19	41	
7	Universidad Católica	34	14	10	10	48	39	+9	38	
8	Santiago Wanderers	34	11	11	12	53	61	−8	33	
9	Deportes Concepción	34	12	7	15	61	59	+2	31	
10	Deportes Ovalle	34	9	12	13	46	48	−2	30	
11	Regional Antofagasta	34	12	6	16	51	70	−19	30	
12	Aviación	34	9	10	15	49	70	−21	28	
13	Lota Schwager	34	7	13	14	48	62	−14	27	
14	Santiago Morning	34	10	7	17	41	57	−16	27	
15	Huachipato	34	10	6	18	49	64	−15	26	Qualified to promotion/relegation Liguilla
16	Rangers	34	7	11	16	41	62	−21	25	Qualified to promotion/relegation Liguilla
17	Naval	34	7	8	19	39	56	−17	22	Relegated to Segunda División
18	Deportes La Serena	34	6	5	23	41	76	−35	17	Relegated to Segunda División

== Scores ==
Home \ Away	ANT	AVI	COL	DCO	EVE	GCT	HUA	LSE	LOT	NAV	DOV	PAL	RAN	SMO	UCA	UCH	UES	SWA
Antofagasta		1–2	1–3	2–2	2–3	1–1	1–0	1–0	2–3	2–1	3–2	1–2	7–1	2–1	1–1	1–0	1–0	2–1
Aviación	3–3		1–1	1–2	1–2	1–1	0–3	3–1	2–0	2–2	0–1	3–1	2–1	0–3	0–0	3–7	1–1	1–3
Colo-Colo	1–0	3–1		2–1	2–0	1–1	4–1	5–1	2–2	2–2	1–1	1–1	4–1	4–2	0–1	2–1	0–0	2–2
Concepción	5–0	4–3	0–1		3–2	1–3	0–3	2–2	1–1	3–2	3–2	0–1	0–1	7–1	2–1	1–3	0–1	3–1
Everton	4–3	2–2	2–3	3–3		2–2	3–0	3–1	2–1	3–1	1–0	3–2	2–1	5–1	3–1	2–1	3–0	3–1
Green Cross T.	4–0	2–0	2–1	2–1	1–1		4–1	1–0	6–2	1–0	4–1	1–1	1–0	1–0	0–1	2–2	1–4	5–2
Huachipato	4–2	2–3	2–2	1–3	1–3	1–2		1–0	2–2	1–0	2–1	3–1	0–2	0–1	3–2	2–3	1–2	1–5
La Serena	0–2	2–4	1–2	2–2	1–4	0–1	1–2		5–3	5–0	2–1	1–1	2–1	2–1	0–0	0–4	1–3	1–2
Lota S.	1–1	1–2	2–2	3–1	1–1	0–0	0–0	2–0		2–1	1–2	0–0	4–1	2–3	2–2	0–0	0–1	2–2
Naval	5–1	2–2	1–0	1–2	0–1	1–0	2–1	4–0	2–2		1–1	2–0	1–1	0–1	0–1	0–1	0–4	1–2
Ovalle	2–0	0–0	3–1	2–1	2–3	0–0	3–1	1–1	0–1	5–2		1–3	0–0	2–1	2–2	0–0	0–2	4–0
Palestino	7–2	3–0	1–1	2–1	2–3	1–0	2–0	4–3	2–2	3–1	5–2		2–1	0–0	4–2	2–0	0–6	1–2
Rangers	2–2	1–2	0–0	1–1	0–2	1–3	3–2	3–4	2–1	0–0	0–0	2–2		2–1	1–0	0–0	2–3	2–0
S. Morning	1–2	1–0	1–2	1–0	1–2	2–0	1–1	3–1	2–3	1–1	1–1	0–3	1–0		1–2	1–2	0–2	2–2
U. Católica	1–0	2–1	1–0	0–1	1–1	3–2	1–1	4–1	3–1	0–1	3–2	1–1	3–1	3–0		3–4	0–1	2–0
U. de Chile	2–1	6–0	0–1	4–2	1–1	2–1	3–1	1–0	6–1	2–1	1–1	2–2	6–3	0–2	0–0		0–0	2–2
U. Española	5–0	3–2	1–0	3–3	1–1	2–1	1–1	2–0	2–1	2–1	1–0	4–1	2–2	1–1	0–0	2–2		5–0
S. Wanderers	0–1	1–1	1–1	1–0	1–1	2–1	0–3	3–0	2–1	2–0	0–0	2–4	2–2	2–2	2–1	1–2	2–2	

Legend: Blue = home team win; Yellow = draw; Red = away team win.

== Championship play-off ==
25 November 1976

Unión Española	0 – 0	Everton

Estadio Nacional, Santiago
Attendance: 68,515
Referee: R. Hormazábal
27 November 1976

Unión Española	1 – 3	Everton
Miranda 86' (pen.)		45' Ahumada; 58' Salinas; 90' Ceballos

Estadio Nacional, Santiago
Attendance: 44,229
Referee: G. Castro

Campeonato Nacional
1976 champions

3rd title

== Liguilla Pre-Copa Libertadores ==
1 December 1976	Universidad de Chile	4 – 2	Palestino	Estadio Nacional, Santiago
	Barrera 14'; Socías 63'; Pinto 65'; Ghiso 88'		8' Fabbiani; 28' Zamora	Attendance: 39,957; Referee: L. Cantillana

1 December 1976	Colo-Colo	0 – 2	Unión Española	Estadio Nacional, Santiago
			36' Herrera; 41' (pen.) Miranda	Attendance: 39,957; Referee: N. Mondría

4 December 1976	Palestino	3 – 2	Unión Española	Estadio Nacional, Santiago
	Own-goal 8'; Zamora 68'; Cavalleri 88'		10' Miranda; 50' Pizarro	Attendance: 30,822; Referee: J. Carvajal

4 December 1976	Colo-Colo	2 – 2	Universidad de Chile	Estadio Nacional, Santiago
	Orellana 60' (pen.); Crisosto 70'		9' Bigorra; 89' Pinto	Attendance: 30,822; Referee: G. Castro

7 December 1976	Colo-Colo	1 – 3	Palestino	Estadio Nacional, Santiago
	Caballero 52'		35', 73' Silva; 45' (pen.) Fabbiani	Attendance: 32,818; Referee: P. Andrade

7 December 1976	Universidad de Chile	2 – 2	Unión Española	Estadio Nacional, Santiago
	Ghiso 80'; Soto 86'		63' Quiroz; 70' Pizarro	Attendance: 32,818; Referee: J. Silvagno

Pos	Team	Pld	W	D	L	GF	GA	GD	Pts	Qualification
1	Universidad de Chile	3	1	2	0	8	6	+2	4	Qualified to Liguilla play-off match
2	Palestino	3	2	0	1	8	7	+1	4	Qualified to Liguilla play-off match
3	Unión Española	3	1	1	1	6	5	+1	3	
4	Colo-Colo	3	0	1	2	3	7	−4	1	

=== Play-off match ===
10 December 1976	Universidad de Chile	2 – 2	Palestino	Estadio Nacional, Santiago
	Ghiso 6'; Socías 48'		18' Zamora; 43' Messen	Attendance: 32,713; Referee: S. Vásquez

Universidad de Chile qualified to 1977 Copa Libertadores due to its better Liguilla's goal difference

== Promotion/relegation Liguilla ==
Pos	Team	Pld	W	D	L	GF	GA	GD	Pts	Qualification
1	Huachipato	3	2	0	1	9	4	+5	4	
2	Audax Italiano	3	2	0	1	7	4	+3	4	Promoted to Primera División
3	Trasandino	3	2	0	1	7	7	0	4	
4	Rangers	3	0	0	3	2	10	−8	0	Relegated to Segunda División

== Topscorer ==
Name	Team	Goals
(Argentina) Óscar Fabbiani	Palestino	23
