= 1975 Copa Chile =

Tournament details
- Country: Chile

The 1975 Copa Chile was the seventh edition of the Chilean Cup tournament. The competition started on March 27, 1975, and concluded on November 19, 1975. Palestino won the competition for the first time, beating Lota Schwager 4–0 on the final.

== Calendar ==
Round	Date
Preliminary round	27–30 March 1975
First round	30 March 1975; 6 April 1975
Round of 16	1–13 May 1975
Quarterfinals	21 May 1975; 10 September 1975
Semi-finals	22–29 October 1975
Final	19 November 1975

== Preliminary round ==
Team 1	Agg.	Team 2	1st leg	2nd leg
Curicó Unido	5–1	Deportes Linares	3–0	2–1
Deportes Ovalle	5–2	Deportes La Serena	2–0	3–2
Unión San Felipe	0–3	Trasandino	0–1	0–2

== First round ==
Team 1	Agg.	Team 2	1st leg	2nd leg
Universidad de Chile	7–2	Ferroviarios	6–2	1–0
Palestino	5–3	Audax Italiano	2–0	3–3
San Luis	3–5	Santiago Wanderers	2–2	1–3
Colo-Colo	5–4	Universidad Católica	3–2	2–2
San Antonio Unido	2–6	Aviación	2–3	0–3
Everton	2–2 (3-4p)	Unión La Calera	2–0	0–2
O'Higgins	4–6	Santiago Morning	2–1	2–5
Deportes Concepción	5–2	Ñublense	2–1	3–1
Lota Schwager	2–2 (a)	Independiente de Cauquenes	1–0	1–2
Iberia	0–2	Naval	0–0	0–2
Malleco Unido	0–4	Green Cross Temuco	0–2	0–2
Curicó Unido	0–4	Rangers	0–1	0–3
Deportes Ovalle	4–4 (a)	Deportes Antofagasta	1–2	3–2
Magallanes	5–4	Trasandino	2–2	3–2

== Round of 16 ==
Team 1	Agg.	Team 2	1st leg	2nd leg
Deportes Ovalle	0–3	Universidad de Chile	0–1	0–2
Santiago Wanderers	1–2	Aviación	0–1	1–1
Colo-Colo	0–3	Palestino	0–1	0–2
Unión La Calera	2–9	Unión Española	1–6	1–3
Magallanes	4–5	Santiago Morning	3–1	1–4
Rangers	2–6	Huachipato	2–2	0–4
Naval	4–2	Green Cross Temuco	1–2	3–0
Deportes Concepción	0–2	Lota Schwager	0–1	0–1

== Quarterfinals ==
Team 1	Agg.	Team 2	1st leg	2nd leg
Universidad de Chile	1–3	Unión Española	1–3	
Palestino	4–2	Santiago Morning	2–2	2–0
Huachipato	2–2 (5-4p)	Naval	1–1	1–1
Lota Schwager	5–1	Aviación	1–0	4–1

== Semifinals ==
22 October 1975

Huachipato	1 – 1	Palestino
Sintas 33'		51' Messen

Estadio Las Higueras, Talcahuano
Attendance: 2,171
Referee: M. Lira

22 October 1975

Lota Schwager	2 – 0	Unión Española
H. González 12'; Ponce 42'

Estadio Federico Schwager, Coronel
Attendance: 4,890
Referee: R. Hormazabal

29 October 1975

Palestino	1 – 0	Huachipato
Pinto 5'

Estadio Nacional, Santiago
Attendance: 5,535
Referee: G. Castro

29 October 1975

Unión Española	0 – 1	Lota Schwager
		46' Ahumada

Estadio Nacional, Santiago
Attendance: 5,535
Referee: P. Andrade

== Final ==
19 November 1975

Palestino	4 – 0	Lota Schwager
Messen 27'; Fabbiani 42'; Hidalgo 78'; Pinto 87'

Estadio Nacional, Santiago
Attendance: 5,229
Referee: R. Hormazabal

== Top goalscorer ==
- Alberto Hidalgo (Palestino) 6 goals

== See also ==
- 1975 Campeonato Nacional
- Primera B
