= 1974 Copa Chile =

Tournament details
- Country: Chile

The 1974 Copa Chile was the sixth edition of the Chilean Cup tournament. The competition started on April 6, 1974, and concluded on August 25, 1974. Colo-Colo won the competition for the second time, beating Santiago Wanderers 3–0 on the final. The points system in the group round awarded 2 points for a win. In the event of a tie, 1 point was awarded to the winner and no points for the loser of a penalty shoot-out.

== Calendar ==
Round	Date
Group Round	6 April 1974; 31 July 1974
Quarterfinals	4–11 August 1974
Semi-finals	15–21 August 1974
Final	25 August 1974

== Group Round ==
=== Northern Group ===
	ANT	COQ	LSE	OVA	SLU	LCA	SFE	TRA	EVE	SWA
D. Antofagasta		1–1 (4-3 p)	2–3	1–0	2–1	3–0	1–0	0–0 (8-7 p)	0–1	1–1 (4-3 p)
Coquimbo U.	1–3		0–2	1–1 (3-4 p)	1–1 (5-3 p)	1–0	1–0	4–4 (3-2 p)	1–1 (3-5 p)	1–3
D. La Serena	1–2	2–2 (5-3 p)		1–2	3–0	2–1	1–1 (4-3 p)	2–1	1–0	1–2
D. Ovalle	3–2	3–0	0–1		2–0	1–2	0–1	0–0 (3-4 p)	4–1	1–0
San Luis	2–0	1–1 (3-4 p)	2–5	2–1		6–1	1–2	0–1	0–2	3–0
U. La Calera	2–2 (3-5 p)	2–1	1–1 (4-3 p)	0–3	1–2		4–3	0–2	1–0	1–0
U. San Felipe	1–1 (5-3 p)	7–0	3–4	2–2 (4-3 p)	1–0	3–0		5–0	2–1	1–2
Trasandino	3–0	2–1	0–2	3–1	2–2 (4-3 p)	3–1	2–1		0–1	1–1 (5-4 p)
Everton	3–3 (4-3 p)	4–0	2–0	0–1	2–0	4–2	1–3	0–1		2–0
S. Wanderers	3–1	3–1	2–0	2–1	4–1	2–0	1–0	2–1	1–1 (4-3 p)	

Rank	Team	Points
1	Santiago Wanderers	23
2	Deportes La Serena	22
3	Trasandino	19
4	Unión San Felipe	18
5	Everton	18
6	Deportes Ovalle	17
7	Deportes Antofagasta	16
8	Unión La Calera	11
9	San Luis	10
10	Coquimbo Unido	7

=== Central Group ===
	UCA	COL	UCH	UES	SMO	AUD	PAL	MAG	FER	AVI	SAU	OHI
U. Católica		4–1	1–2	0–1	1–1 (5-3 p)	1–0	0–1	3–3 (3-4 p)	0–1	1–2	4–1	2–3
Colo-Colo	3–1		2–1	2–1	2–2 (4-5 p)	5–2	0–1	0–1	3–1	1–0	5–0	1–2
U. de Chile	4–1	2–1		4–2	5–1	0–0 (4-3 p)	2–1	3–1	2–2 (4-3 p)	0–3	1–0	3–1
U. Española	0–3	2–2 (3-4 p)	1–0		1–0	2–1	1–2	0–0 (4-3 p)	1–0	2–0	2–1	0–0 (3-4 p)
S. Morning	3–0	0–2	2–2 (2-3 p)	2–2 (4-3 p)		2–0	0–1	1–0	1–0	2–2 (3-4 p)	3–1	3–3 (4-3 p)
Audax I.	0–2	0–3	1–2	1–1 (3-4 p)	0–2		1–2	1–3	0–0 (4-3 p)	2–1	1–2	1–2
Palestino	1–0	2–0	2–2 (4-5 p)	2–1	3–0	4–0		2–2 (4-5 p)	3–0	3–1	3–1	1–0
Magallanes	2–2 (4-5 p)	1–3	1–2	1–1 (4-3 p)	0–3	3–3 (4-5 p)	0–1		1–0	2–1	6–2	1–2
Ferroviarios	1–4	0–2	3–4	1–3	0–2	1–1 (5-3 p)	1–2	1–1 (3-4 p)		1–1 (3-4 p)	2–1	1–4
Aviación	2–0	0–1	1–0	1–0	2–1	0–0 (4-3 p)	1–1 (3-4 p)	1–3	1–1 (4-2 p)		5–1	0–0 (4-3 p)
San Antonio U.	1–1 (3-4 p)	0–1	2–1	2–1	0–2	0–2	0–1	1–2	3–0	1–1 (5-4 p)		1–2
O'Higgins	3–2	1–1 (3-4 p)	1–0	1–1 (5-3 p)	3–0	2–3	1–7	1–2	4–0	1–0	2–2 (5-3 p)	

Rank	Team	Points
1	Palestino	38
2	Colo-Colo	28 (+17)
3	Universidad de Chile	28 (+12)
4	O'Higgins	25
5	Santiago Morning	21
6	Magallanes	20
7	Aviación	20
8	Unión Española	18
9	Universidad Católica	14
10	San Antonio Unido	8
11	Audax Italiano	8
12	Ferroviarios	5

=== Southern Group ===
	CUR	RAN	LRO	IND	ÑUB	NAV	HUA	CON	LOT	IBE	MAL	GCT
Curicó U.		0–3	9–0	2–0	0–2	3–2	1–0	1–1 (6-7 p)	1–2	2–1	3–0	2–0
Rangers	4–2		4–1	2–1	3–1	0–0 (3-4 p)	1–1 (4-3 p)	1–3	1–2	3–0		2–2 (5-4 p)
Lister Rossel	0–1	1–2		1–2	0–2	2–2 (5-4 p)	0–2	0–4	1–1 (5-4 p)	3–1	3–0	0–3
Independiente C.	1–1 (4-2 p)	0–1	2–1		1–1 (4-5 p)	0–1	0–1	1–1 (2-4 p)	3–4	5–2	3–5	0–2
Ñublense	5–1	2–1	1–1 (5-3 p)	1–1 (4-3 p)		0–2	1–2	2–1	1–2	3–1	1–1 (2-4 p)	1–3
Naval	3–1	2–2 (1-4 p)	6–3	4–0	2–1		0–0 (3-4 p)	0–1	1–0	2–0	7–0	2–0
Huachipato	2–1	3–1	8–0	3–2	2–0	0–1		1–0	0–0 (3-2 p)	7–0	3–1	2–1
D. Concepción	1–2	1–0	1–0	2–1	1–0	2–0	2–2 (4-3 p)		2–0	3–0	6–0	2–3
Lota S.	4–1	2–0	3–2	1–0	4–0	0–1	0–1	2–1		1–0	2–0	1–0
Iberia	1–1 (2-3 p)	1–0	1–1 (3-4 p)	3–1	2–2 (4-3 p)	0–1	0–1	1–1 (4-3 p)	0–2		0–1	1–1 (2-4 p)
Malleco U.	0–1	1–2	1–0	1–1 (4-3 p)	2–4	0–1	1–3	0–4	0–1	0–0 (4-3 p)		0–1
Green Cross T.	3–0	4–0	5–0	5–1	3–1	1–1 (4-3 p)	1–2	1–0	2–1	4–2	4–1	

Rank	Team	Points
1	Huachipato	34
2	Green Cross Temuco	30 (+27)
3	Lota Schwager	30 (+17)
4	Naval	29
5	Deportes Concepción	27
6	Curicó Unido	21
7	Rangers	21
8	Ñublense	18
9	Malleco Unido	9
10	Independiente Cauquenes	7
11	Lister Rossel	7
12	Iberia Los Ángeles	5

== Quarterfinals ==
Team 1	Agg.	Team 2	1st leg	2nd leg
Colo-Colo	4–3	Green Cross Temuco	2–1	2–2
Deportes La Serena	2–4	Palestino	1–1	1–3
Lota Schwager	2–2	Huachipato	1–1	1–1
Santiago Wanderers	5–1	Universidad de Chile	3–1	2–0

== Semifinals ==
15 August 1974

Santiago Wanderers	0 – 0	Palestino

Estadio Municipal, Valparaíso
Attendance: 13,809
Referee: L. Cantillana

15 August 1974

Colo-Colo	1 – 2	Huachipato
Solís 41'		Sintas 54', 58'

Estadio Nacional, Santiago
Attendance: 10,788
Referee: M. Lira

18 August 1974

Palestino	1 – 1 (a)	Santiago Wanderers
Henry 90'		87' Mena

Estadio Nacional, Santiago
Attendance: 6,915
Referee: E. Rojas

18 August 1974

Huachipato	1 – 2	Colo-Colo
Silva 68'		69' Gamboa; 89' Crisosto

Estadio Las Higueras, Talcahuano
Attendance: 12,254
Referee: R. Hormazabal

21 August 1974

Colo-Colo	2 – 1	Huachipato
Araneda 31'; Gamboa 77'		43' Neira

Estadio El Teniente, Rancagua
Attendance: 13,212
Referee: J. Silvagno

== Final ==
25 August 1974

Colo-Colo	3 – 0	Santiago Wanderers
Araneda 21', 66'; Gamboa 82'

Estadio Nacional, Santiago
Attendance: 50,468
Referee: R. Hormazabal

== Top goalscorer ==
- Oscar Fabbiani (Unión San Felipe) 21 goals

== See also ==
- 1974 Campeonato Nacional
- 1974 Segunda División
- Primera B
