= 1974 Campeonato Nacional Primera División =

Campeonato Nacional de Fútbol
- Dates: 1 September 1974 – 2 February 1975
- Champions: Huachipato (1st title)
- Relegated: Unión San Felipe; Unión La Calera
- 1975 Copa Libertadores: Huachipato; Unión Española
- Matches: 306
- Goals: 962 (3.14 per match)
- Top goalscorer: Julio Crisosto (28 goals)
- Biggest away win: Unión La Calera 1–8 Palestino (2 February 1975)
- Highest attendance: 53,880 Colo-Colo 2–2 Huachipato (11 January 1975)
- Total attendance: 1,366,411
- Average attendance: 4,480

The 1974 Campeonato Nacional de Fútbol Profesional was the Chilean football top tier's 42nd season. Huachipato was the tournament's champion, winning their first top-level title, and became the first team from Southern Chile to be national champions.

== Standing ==
Pos	Team	Pld	W	D	L	GF	GA	GD	Pts	Qualification or relegation
1	Huachipato	34	24	6	4	63	30	+33	54	Champions & Qualified to the 1975 Copa Libertadores
2	Palestino	34	21	10	3	74	41	+33	52	Qualified to the Pre-Copa Libertadores Liguilla
3	Colo-Colo	34	21	9	4	78	43	+35	51	Qualified to the Pre-Copa Libertadores Liguilla
4	Unión Española	34	18	10	6	68	42	+26	46	Qualified to the Pre-Copa Libertadores Liguilla
5	Magallanes	34	16	7	11	61	47	+14	39	
6	Deportes Concepción	34	13	10	11	47	45	+2	36	
7	Green Cross Temuco	34	9	16	9	36	40	−4	34	
8	Naval	34	11	11	12	43	43	0	33	
9	O'Higgins	34	11	10	13	44	45	−1	32	
10	Aviación	34	10	12	12	51	59	−8	32	
11	Lota Schwager	34	8	14	12	49	48	+1	30	
12	Regional Antofagasta	34	11	8	15	45	64	−19	30	
13	Universidad de Chile	34	11	6	17	63	63	0	28	
14	Deportes La Serena	34	8	12	14	55	56	−1	28	
15	Santiago Wanderers	34	9	10	15	55	61	−6	28	Qualified to the Pre-Copa Libertadores Liguilla
16	Rangers	34	9	7	18	45	72	−27	25	
17	Unión La Calera	34	5	9	20	43	87	−44	19	Relegated to 1975 Segunda División de Chile
18	Unión San Felipe	34	4	7	23	42	76	−34	15	Relegated to 1975 Segunda División de Chile

Campeonato Profesional
1974 champions

Huachipato
1st title

== Scores ==
Home \ Away	ANT	AVI	COL	DCO	GCT	HUA	LSE	LOT	MAG	NAV	OHI	PAL	RAN	SFE	LCA	UCH	UES	SWA
Antofagasta		1–1	0–1	4–0	1–1	3–2	1–1	2–0	2–1	1–0	1–1	2–2	4–2	2–1	2–2	3–2	1–1	2–1
Aviación	3–2		0–4	1–0	4–1	0–2	4–2	1–1	2–4	2–2	1–0	0–1	5–2	0–0	2–2	2–1	1–3	2–2
Colo-Colo	2–1	3–1		1–1	4–0	2–2	2–1	5–2	1–0	3–1	2–0	1–1	4–3	2–1	5–2	2–1	1–1	6–2
Concepción	2–1	1–1	1–1		2–2	1–2	1–1	1–1	2–1	0–1	1–0	0–2	2–0	2–1	6–0	1–0	2–2	2–1
Green Cross T.	2–0	1–2	1–1	0–0		1–1	1–1	0–0	1–1	1–0	1–1	1–2	1–1	1–0	1–1	0–0	0–1	1–0
Huachipato	1–0	1–0	1–0	3–0	2–1		3–0	0–0	3–1	3–2	1–0	0–0	3–0	3–1	4–1	1–0	2–1	3–0
La Serena	8–2	0–1	1–4	4–2	1–4	0–1		2–0	1–2	1–1	4–4	2–3	3–0	5–1	1–0	1–0	1–1	4–1
Lota S.	0–1	3–1	0–1	4–0	1–1	3–0	0–0		2–0	2–2	2–0	0–3	3–0	2–2	5–1	1–2	0–0	2–2
Magallanes	4–1	2–2	1–1	2–0	0–1	1–2	1–0	2–2		1–0	0–0	3–0	1–2	2–4	3–1	0–1	0–3	3–1
Naval	4–0	0–0	3–1	0–2	2–0	1–2	2–0	2–2	1–5		0–2	0–0	4–3	2–1	3–1	3–2	1–0	1–0
O'Higgins	3–2	1–0	4–2	0–0	2–2	2–2	1–1	1–0	2–0	0–0		0–3	5–0	0–0	2–1	0–3	1–2	2–3
Palestino	1–1	2–1	3–5	1–1	3–1	2–1	0–0	1–0	3–3	0–0	5–1		3–0	3–2	2–1	3–2	1–2	2–1
Rangers	3–1	2–2	1–1	1–3	2–1	2–2	2–0	1–1	0–2	1–0	2–0	1–2		3–1	1–0	0–0	0–2	3–3
San Felipe	0–1	5–2	2–4	0–3	0–1	0–2	4–1	2–1	2–3	0–0	0–3	2–5	2–3		1–1	0–2	2–1	2–2
La Calera	1–0	2–2	2–2	2–4	0–0	1–2	3–3	3–2	2–4	1–0	0–1	1–8	3–2	3–0		0–4	1–3	1–4
U. de Chile	2–0	3–4	1–3	1–4	2–3	1–4	3–3	2–2	2–3	3–2	2–3	2–2	3–2	3–2	7–2		1–1	4–2
U. Española	3–0	2–0	0–2	2–0	1–1	3–1	3–2	3–4	1–1	3–3	2–1	2–3	3–0	5–2	2–1	3–1		2–1
S. Wanderers	6–0	1–1	2–1	2–1	1–2	0–1	0–0	4–1	1–2	0–0	2–1	2–4	2–0	1–1	0–0	1–0	4–4	

Legend: Blue = home team win; Yellow = draw; Red = away team win.

== Top goalscorers ==
Rank	Name	Club	Goals
1	(Chile) Julio Crisosto	Colo-Colo	28
2	(Argentina) Juan Carlos Sarnari	Universidad de Chile	24
3	(Uruguay) Carlos Sintas	Huachipato	23
4	(Chile) Alberto Hidalgo	Palestino	20
5	(Chile) Sergio Ahumada	Unión Española	17

== Liguilla Pre-Copa Libertadores ==
5 February 1975	Palestino	1 – 1	Santiago Wanderers	Estadio Nacional, Santiago
	Ramírez 61' (pen.)		37' Dubanced	Attendance: 43,335; Referee: S. Vásquez

5 February 1975	Colo-Colo	0 – 2	Unión Española	Estadio Nacional, Santiago
			76' Miranda; 86' Palacios	Attendance: 43,335; Referee: C. Robles

8 February 1975	Unión Española	1 – 1	Palestino	Estadio Nacional, Santiago
	Own-goal 33'		90' Vásquez	Attendance: 25,296; Referee: J. Silvagno

8 February 1975	Colo-Colo	5 – 0	Santiago Wanderers	Estadio Nacional, Santiago
	Araneda 30'; Gamboa 23', 44', 73'; Crisosto 80'			Attendance: 25,296; Referee: R. Hormazábal

11 February 1975	Colo-Colo	4 – 2	Palestino	Estadio Nacional, Santiago
	Crisosto 24', 75'; Véliz 51'; Valdés 57'		9' Fabbiani; 78' Vásquez	Attendance: 35,609; Referee: J. Silvagno

11 February 1975	Unión Española	2 – 2	Santiago Wanderers	Estadio Nacional, Santiago
	Spedaletti 52'; Miranda 59'		63' Mena; 72' Dubanced	Attendance: 35,609; Referee: M. Lira

=== Final play-off ===
13 February 1975	Colo-Colo	1 – 2	Unión Española	Estadio Nacional, Santiago
	Own-goal 53'		59' Araneda; 75' Spedaletti	Attendance: 48,886; Referee: M. Lira

Unión Española also qualified for the 1975 Copa Libertadores

== See also ==
- 1974 Copa Chile
