= 1975 Campeonato Nacional Primera División =

Campeonato Nacional 1975
- Dates: 12 April 1975 – 11 January 1976
- Champions: Unión Española (4th title)
- Relegated: O'Higgins; Magallanes
- 1976 Copa Libertadores: Unión Española; Palestino
- Matches: 307
- Goals: 932 (3.04 per match)
- Top goalscorer: Víctor Pizarro (27 goals)
- Biggest home win: Unión Española 7–1 Santiago Morning (10 January 1976)
- Highest attendance: 37,434 Colo-Colo 2–2 Unión Española (4 January 1976)
- Total attendance: 1,295,932
- Average attendance: 4,249

The 1975 Campeonato Nacional de Futbol Profesional was Chilean top tier's 43rd season. Unión Española was the tournament's champion, winning its fourth title.

== Standings ==
Pos	Team	Pld	W	D	L	GF	GA	GD	Pts	Qualification or relegation
1	Unión Española	34	20	10	4	76	36	+40	50	Champions and qualified to 1976 Copa Libertadores
2	Deportes Concepción	34	20	8	6	56	30	+26	48	Qualified to Liguilla Pre-Copa Libertadores
3	Huachipato	34	18	6	10	57	40	+17	42	Qualified to Liguilla Pre-Copa Libertadores
4	Green Cross Temuco	34	15	12	7	51	38	+13	42	Qualified to Liguilla Pre-Copa Libertadores
5	Palestino	34	13	13	8	66	49	+17	39	Qualified to Liguilla Pre-Copa Libertadores
6	Colo-Colo	34	16	7	11	56	44	+12	39	
7	Lota Schwager	34	14	9	11	44	46	−2	37	
8	Santiago Morning	34	13	7	14	59	68	−9	33	
9	Regional Antofagasta	34	9	13	12	64	62	+2	31	
10	Santiago Wanderers	34	9	12	13	33	43	−10	30	
11	Deportes La Serena	34	11	8	15	50	61	−11	30	
12	Everton	34	8	13	13	57	59	−2	29	
13	Universidad de Chile	34	10	9	15	50	56	−6	29	
14	Naval	34	9	11	14	32	47	−15	29	
15	Rangers	34	9	9	16	50	66	−16	27	
16	Magallanes	34	9	8	17	45	65	−20	26	Qualified to Relegation Play-off
17	Aviación	34	8	10	16	40	63	−23	26	Qualified to Relegation Play-off
18	O'Higgins	34	8	9	17	46	59	−13	25	Relegated to Segunda División

Campeonato Nacional
1975 champions
Unión Española
4th title

== Scores ==
Home \ Away	ANT	AVI	COL	DCO	EVE	GCT	HUA	LSE	LOT	MAG	NAV	OHI	PAL	RAN	SMO	UCH	UES	SWA
Antofagasta		5–0	5–4	2–2	5–3	4–4	1–3	3–0	1–1	1–3	1–1	2–0	2–0	1–1	2–4	2–0	0–1	1–1
Aviación	3–2		1–0	0–1	4–2	1–2	1–2	2–2	2–2	0–1	3–1	2–2	1–1	2–2	1–4	2–1	1–1	3–1
Colo-Colo	0–0	1–0		3–5	1–1	3–2	0–0	2–0	3–1	3–1	2–1	0–0	6–4	4–2	0–1	0–1	1–0	3–0
Concepción	1–0	3–2	0–1		2–2	1–1	1–1	1–0	2–1	5–0	5–0	2–0	0–0	2–1	3–1	3–0	2–2	3–1
Everton	2–2	1–1	0–3	3–1		0–1	4–0	1–1	0–1	4–2	3–2	4–0	4–5	1–1	4–3	1–0	1–3	1–1
Green Cross T.	2–2	0–0	2–2	0–1	0–0		2–0	2–0	2–0	4–3	0–0	2–0	0–0	2–1	2–0	2–0	0–0	1–1
Huachipato	3–1	6–0	2–1	0–1	3–2	2–4		4–0	2–1	3–0	1–0	2–1	0–2	5–1	1–1	0–2	2–2	1–0
La Serena	4–4	1–1	2–1	1–0	1–0	2–2	0–1		2–1	2–1	2–1	3–2	0–3	3–2	6–2	2–2	2–3	0–1
Lota S.	0–0	2–1	2–1	1–2	1–1	2–1	3–2	2–0		2–1	0–0	2–0	0–0	1–1	1–0	2–1	2–3	2–1
Magallanes	1–0	1–1	3–2	1–2	1–1	0–2	1–2	2–1	0–2		2–2	1–2	1–5	1–1	3–1	2–1	1–1	3–0
Naval	1–0	1–0	0–1	1–0	0–0	1–2	0–0	1–4	2–1	0–0		2–2	2–0	1–0	1–2	1–0	0–1	2–1
O'Higgins	1–3	0–2	0–2	1–2	2–1	1–1	1–2	2–1	4–0	2–3	3–1		1–1	2–0	3–3	0–1	0–0	2–2
Palestino	3–3	4–1	1–2	1–2	1–1	3–1	2–0	0–0	1–1	1–1	3–0	2–1		2–3	2–2	3–3	1–2	2–1
Rangers	5–3	1–0	2–0	1–0	1–1	2–3	0–2	2–2	1–2	3–1	0–1	2–1	1–3		1–0	1–3	2–4	1–1
S. Morning	3–2	3–0	3–1	2–0	1–4	1–0	2–1	2–1	2–1	2–1	1–1	1–3	3–4	2–3		2–2	0–2	1–1
U. de Chile	3–3	1–2	0–1	0–1	3–2	2–0	0–3	2–3	2–2	2–1	2–2	2–2	2–2	2–2	3–2		3–2	3–0
U. Española	2–0	5–0	0–0	0–0	4–2	3–1	1–1	4–1	4–0	3–0	3–1	5–2	1–4	5–3	7–1	2–1		0–0
S. Wanderers	0–1	1–0	2–2	0–0	2–0	0–0	2–0	1–2	1–2	2–1	1–1	1–3	2–0	2–1	1–1	1–0	1–0	

Legend: Blue = home team win; Yellow = draw; Red = away team win.

== Relegation play-off ==
Magallanes	0–1	Aviación

Magallanes relegated to 1976 Segunda División

== Topscorer ==
Name	Team	Goals
(Chile) Víctor Pizarro	Santiago Morning	27

== Liguilla Pre-Copa Libertadores ==
17 January 1976	Deportes Concepción	1 – 1	Palestino	Estadio Municipal, Concepción
	L. Díaz 8'		65' Messen	Attendance: 9,888; Referee: R. Hormazábal

18 January 1976	Green Cross Temuco	0 – 0	Huachipato	Estadio Municipal, Temuco
				Attendance: 5,939; Referee: S. Vásquez

21 January 1976	Huachipato	2 – 0	Deportes Concepción	Estadio Nacional, Santiago
	Sintas 33'; Neira 41'			Attendance: 13,988; Referee: M. Lira

21 January 1976	Palestino	2 – 2	Green Cross Temuco	Estadio Nacional, Santiago
	Hidalgo 16'; Fabbiani 75' (pen.)		62' Graf; 80' (pen.) Núñez	Attendance: 13,988; Referee: A. Martínez

24 January 1976	Deportes Concepción	3 – 1	Green Cross Temuco	Estadio Nacional, Santiago
	Cavalleri 39' (pen.); Distéfano 80'; Briones 89'		19' Graf	Attendance: 17,298; Referee: L. Cantillana

24 January 1976	Palestino	3 – 1	Huachipato	Estadio Nacional, Santiago
	Messen 24'; Own-goal 64'; Hidalgo 89'		54' Sintas	Attendance: 17,298; Referee: R. Hormazábal

Pos	Team	Pld	W	D	L	GF	GA	GD	Pts	Qualification
1	Palestino	3	1	2	0	6	4	+2	4	Qualified to 1976 Copa Libertadores
2	Deportes Concepción	3	1	1	1	4	4	0	3	
3	Huachipato	3	1	1	1	3	3	0	3	
4	Green Cross Temuco	3	0	2	1	3	5	−2	2	

Source: rsssf.com

== See also ==
- 1975 Copa Chile
