= Atanasio Pardo =

Chilean footballer (1900–1994)

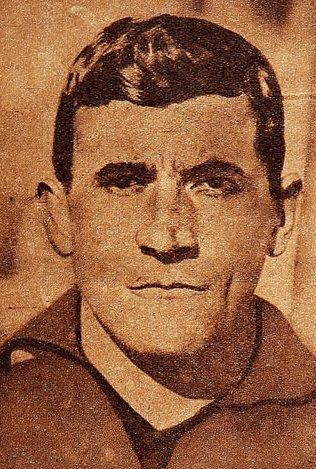

Personal information
- Full name: Atanasio Pardo Vega
- Date of birth: 6 April 1900
- Place of birth: Santiago, Chile
- Date of death: 30 July 1994 (aged 94)
- Place of death: Santiago, Chile
- Position: Left winger

Youth career
- Asociación Escolar

Senior career*
Years	Team	Apps	(Gls)
- Magallanes Atlético
1919–1922	Ibérico Balompié		
1922–1924	Unión Deportiva Española		
1925	Victoria FC		
192?	Saint-Denis		
192?	África Sport Club		
1925–1926	Real Málaga	5	(2)
1926–1927	Unión Deportiva Española		
1927–1929	Málaga FC	8	(1)
1929–1931	Antequera CF		
1931	FC Malagueño		
1931–1932	Antequera CF		
1933	Málaga Sport Club		
1941	Lautaro de Buin		
1942	Tricolor Nacional		

Managerial career
- 1929–1932: Antequera
- 193?–1938: Unión Española (assistant)
- 1938: Unión Española
- 1939: Central
- 1941: Lautaro de Buin
- 1942: Tricolor Nacional
- 1943: Unión Española
- * Club domestic league appearances and goals

Atanasio Pardo Vega (6 April 1900 – 30 July 1994) was a Chilean football manager and player who played as a left winger, considered the first Chilean footballer who emigrated to Europe holding a contract and played in Spain.

== Playing career ==
As a youth players, Pardo and David Arellano, one of the founders of Colo-Colo, were members of Asociación Escolar, a team made up by select students. They also coincided after in Magallanes Atlético.

Pardo played for both Magallanes Atlético and Ibérico Balompié, later Unión Deportiva Española, before emigrating to Spain by suggestion of his fellow footballer Juan Legarreta. He joined Real Málaga in the Campeonato Regional Sur in 1925, playing for several seasons for the club, in an age where it was changing his name to Málaga FC, FC Malagueño and Málaga Sport Club. In Málaga, he also played for Victoria Football Club and Antequera CF.

Pardo also had stints with Saint-Denis in France and África Sport Club, a team that he called "The Spanish from Africa".

For a brief stint in 1926–27, he returned to Chile and played for Unión Deportiva Española. In the 1930s, he returned to Chile again as a retired player.

According to his sons, he returned permanently to Chile in 1941 after the Spanish Civil War, and played for Lautaro de Buin, Tricolor Nacional from Paine, being considered a legend of the club, among others.

== Coaching career ==
Back in Chile, Pardo joined Unión Deportiva Española as assistant of Andrés García. In 1938–39 he served as coach of Unión Española until the team retired from the Campeonato Nacional due to the Spanish Civil War, using the name Central in the match against Colo-Colo on 16 April 1939. In 1943, he assumed as head coach again and won the Primera División de Chile, the first league title for the team. As a curiosity, Pardo was the oldest coach and led the youngest squad at the tournament.

He also coached another clubs such as Antequera CF in Spain and both Lautaro de Buin and Tricolor de Paine in Chile, winning local championships, at the same time he performed as a player.

== Personal life ==
His parents, Atanasio Sr. and Amalia, were Spanish who came first to Valparaíso, Chile, and next they made his home in Paine.

His twin brother, José, also was a footballer who played as a right winger, with whom Atanasio coincided in Unión Deportiva Española.

In Spain, he was nicknamed El Hombre-Relámpago (The Lightning Man) due to his speed as well as The Chilean (El Chileno).

Pardo married twice. From his first marriage, he had three children: Paty, Carlitos and Alicia. From his second marriage, he had nine children. His daughter Amalia played football for Unión Española and his son Arturo is the father-in-law of the Chile international goalkeeper Claudio Bravo.

He graduated as a obstetrician at the University of Málaga and helped labours in Viluco, Buin, where he made his home. He also served as President of the neighborhood association.

== Honours ==
=== As player ===
Ibérico Balompíe

- Copa Unión-Asociación de Football de Santiago: 1920, 1924

=== As manager ===
Unión Española

- Chilean Primera División (1): 1943

== Legacy ==
Due to his contributions in Viluco, he is considered the driving force of Posta Viluco, the local medical center, where his daughter, María Luz, went go on helping of the community.

A street from Buin was given his name.
