= Guillermo Páez =

Chilean footballer (born 1945)

Personal information
- Full name: Guillermo Alejandro Páez Cepeda
- Date of birth: 18 April 1945 (age 81)
- Place of birth: Santiago, Chile
- Position: Defensive midfielder

Youth career
- Juventud Universitaria

Senior career*
Years	Team	Apps	(Gls)
1960–1964	Universidad Católica		
1965	Coquimbo Unido	9	(1)
1966	San Antonio Unido		
1967–1971	Lota Schwager		
1972–1975	Colo-Colo	98	(3)
1976	Aviación	18	(0)
1977–1979	Santiago Morning	81	(1)
1980	Santiago Wanderers	22	(0)
1981	Santiago Morning		
1981	Talagante Ferro		
1982	Santiago Morning	0	(0)

International career
1972–1974	Chile	14	(0)

Managerial career
- 1984: Santiago Morning
- 1985: Deportes Laja
- 1986–1987: Curicó Unido
- 1988: Lota Schwager
- 1989–1990: Magallanes
- 1991: Soinca Bata
- 1992: Deportes Melipilla
- 1992–1994: Deportes Temuco
- 1995: Rangers
- 1996: Deportes Melipilla
- 1996–1997: Unión Española
- 1997: Santiago Morning
- 1998: Deportes Melipilla
- 1999: Santiago Wanderers
- 2000–2001: O'Higgins
- 2001–2002: Deportes Melipilla
- 2004: Deportes Melipilla
- 2005: Deportes Melipilla
- 2006: Magallanes
- 2006: Fernández Vial
- 2006–2007: Santiago Morning
- 2011: Deportes Melipilla
- * Club domestic league appearances and goals

Guillermo Alejandro Páez Cepeda (born 18 April 1945) is a former Chilean footballer who played for 6 clubs of Chile and in the Chile national football team in the FIFA World Cup Germany 1974.

== Personal life ==
He is the older brother of the former footballer and manager Juan Páez.

He is the father-in-law of the also former Chile international footballer Mauricio Pozo.

He is also known by his nickname Loco Páez (Crazy).

== Honours ==
=== Player ===
Universidad Católica

- Primera División de Chile (1): 1966

Lota Schwager

- Segunda División de Chile (1): 1969

Colo-Colo

- Primera División de Chile (1): 1972
- Copa Chile (1): 1974

Chile

- Copa Carlos Dittborn (1): 1973
