= 1951 Campeonato Nacional Primera División =

Campeonato Nacional de Fútbol Profesional
- Dates: 28 April 1951 – 13 December 1951
- Champions: Unión Española (2nd title)
- Matches: 163
- Goals: 634 (3.89 per match)
- Top goalscorer: Carlos Tello; Rubén Aguilera (21 goals)
- Biggest away win: Magallanes 0–6 Santiago Morning (21 July); Green Cross 0–6 Magallanes (15 September)
- Highest attendance: 59,843 Universidad de Chile 2–2 Universidad Católica (31 October)
- Total attendance: 1,760,903
- Average attendance: 10,803

The 1951 Campeonato Nacional de Fútbol Profesional was Chilean first tier’s 19th season. Unión Española was the tournament’s champion, winning its second title.

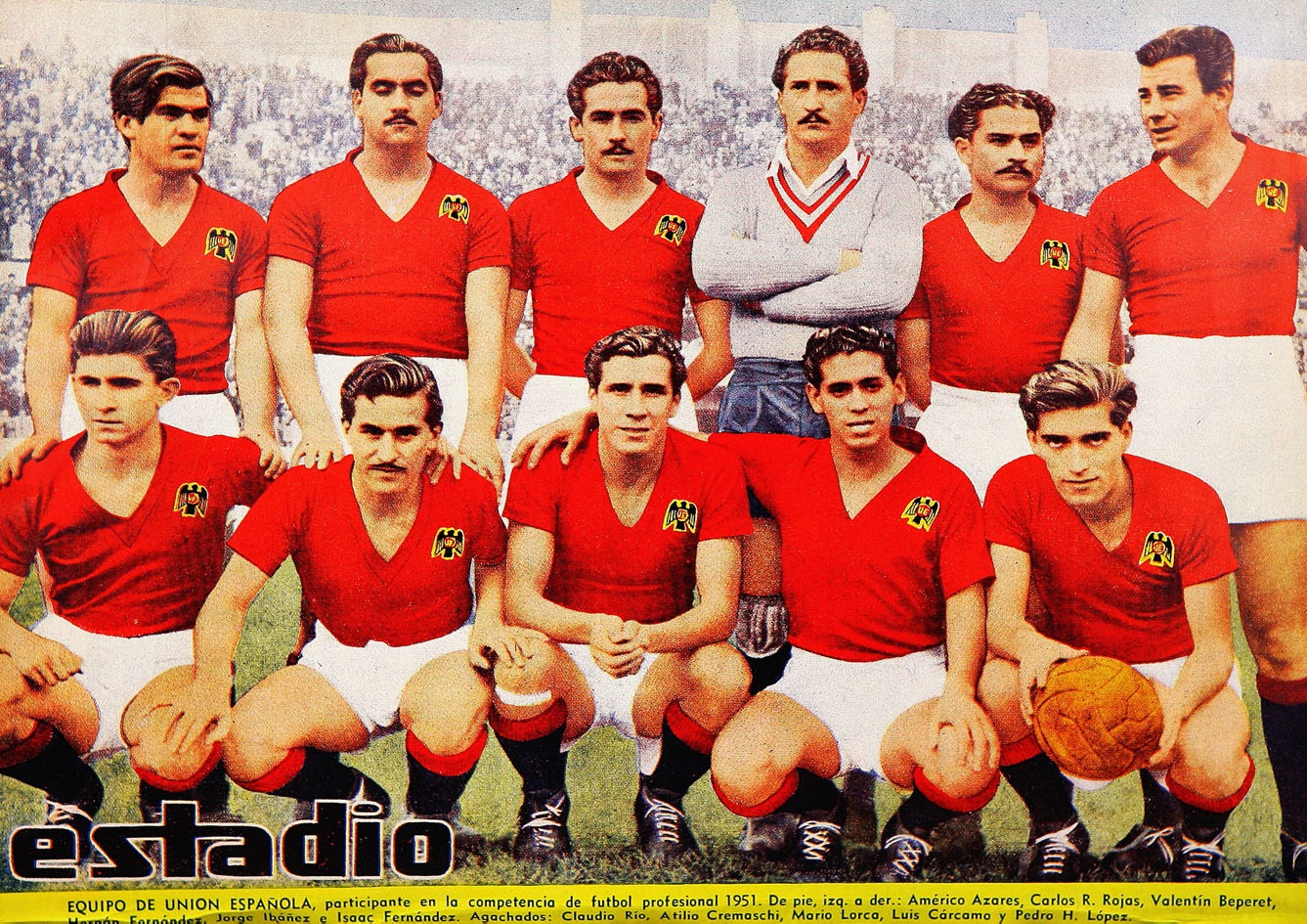
Unión Española’s champion team in 1951

== First stage ==
=== Scores ===
	AUD	COL	EVE	FEB	GCR	IBE	MAG	SMO	UES	UCA	UCH	SWA
Audax		3–2	0–3	3–3	4–1	2–1	2–1	4–1	1–1	2–1	1–2	2–1
Colo-Colo	3–1		1–2	5–3	2–0	4–2	2–1	1–3	3–3	2–1	2–2	2–0
Everton	1–1	2–2		6–1	2–0	3–1	4–0	1–3	4–3	2–4	3–1	4–2
Ferrobádminton	0–4	1–3	2–4		1–3	3–2	3–0	0–4	1–3	4–4	0–3	1–1
Green Cross	1–2	1–1	0–4	2–6		0–3	0–6	4–4	6–4	1–0	1–2	0–1
Iberia	0–1	2–1	2–1	4–0	5–3		5–0	4–2	1–3	2–4	2–3	1–0
Magallanes	1–4	1–1	2–3	3–1	1–3	4–1		0–6	4–2	2–1	1–1	2–2
S. Morning	0–2	0–1	4–1	2–0	3–0	0–0	3–2		4–2	1–1	0–1	5–0
U. Española	0–3	1–0	2–2	1–0	3–2	3–2	4–2	1–3		2–1	4–0	5–2
U. Católica	3–0	2–3	0–0	5–2	2–0	3–0	1–1	1–0	2–2		3–1	3–4
U. de Chile	1–1	1–2	2–2	3–0	2–0	2–2	1–1	1–1	1–4	2–2		1–0
S. Wanderers	2–1	2–2	3–0	0–1	2–2	1–2	7–2	3–1	0–0	1–2	0–0	

=== Standings ===
Pos	Team	Pld	W	D	L	GF	GA	GD	Pts	Qualification
1	Audax Italiano	22	13	4	5	44	29	+15	30	Qualifies to Championship stage
2	Everton	22	12	5	5	54	36	+18	29	Qualifies to Championship stage
3	Colo-Colo	22	11	6	5	45	35	+10	28	Qualifies to Championship stage
4	Unión Española	22	11	5	6	53	44	+9	27	Qualifies to Championship stage
5	Santiago Morning	22	11	4	7	50	30	+20	26	Qualifies to Championship stage
6	Universidad de Chile	22	8	9	5	33	32	+1	25	Qualifies to Championship stage
7	Universidad Católica	22	9	6	7	46	34	+12	24	
8	Iberia	22	9	2	11	44	43	+1	20	
9	Santiago Wanderers	22	6	6	10	35	39	−4	18	
10	Magallanes	22	5	5	12	37	57	−20	15	
11	Ferrobádminton	22	4	3	15	33	65	−32	11	
12	Green Cross	22	4	3	15	30	60	−30	11	

== Championship stage ==
=== Scores ===
	AUD	COL	EVE	SMO	UES	UCH
Audax		0–3	4–2	4–2	2–6	1–0
Colo-Colo			1–0	1–2	2–4	0–1
Everton				1–4	2–4	4–1
S. Morning					3–4	0–2
U. Española						1–1
U. de Chile						

=== Standings ===
Pos	Team	Pld	W	D	L	GF	GA	GD	Pts
1	Unión Española	5	4	1	0	19	10	+9	9
2	Audax Italiano	5	3	0	2	11	13	−2	6
3	Universidad de Chile	5	2	1	2	5	6	−1	5
4	Colo-Colo	5	2	0	3	7	7	0	4
5	Santiago Morning	5	2	0	3	11	12	−1	4
6	Everton	5	1	0	4	9	14	−5	2

=== Aggregate top standings ===
Pos	Team	Pld	W	D	L	GF	GA	GD	Pts	Qualification
1	Unión Española	27	15	6	6	72	54	+18	36	Qualified to Championship play-off
2	Audax Italiano	27	16	4	7	55	42	+13	36	Qualified to Championship play-off
3	Colo-Colo	27	13	6	8	52	42	+10	32	
4	Everton	27	13	5	9	63	50	+13	31	
5	Santiago Morning	27	13	4	10	61	42	+19	30	
6	Universidad de Chile	27	10	10	7	38	38	0	30	

=== Championship play-off ===
13 December 1951

Unión Española	1–0	Audax Italiano
Lorca 74' (pen.)

Estadio Nacional, Santiago
Attendance: 41,877
Referee: W. Crawford

Chilean Campeonato
de Fútbol Profesional
1951 champions
Unión Española
2nd title

== Relegation stage ==
=== Scores ===
	FEB	GCR	IBE	MAG	UCA	SWA
Ferrobádminton		2–1	2–3	2–4	4–3	1–2
Green Cross			3–2	3–2	4–1	2–0
Iberia				1–2	4–5	2–2
Magallanes					3–2	0–0
U. Católica						2–3
S. Wanderers						

=== Standings ===
Pos	Team	Pld	W	D	L	GF	GA	GD	Pts
1	Green Cross	5	4	0	1	13	7	+6	8
2	Magallanes	5	3	1	1	11	8	+3	7
3	Santiago Wanderers	5	2	2	1	7	7	0	6
4	Ferrobádminton	5	2	0	3	11	13	−2	4
5	Iberia	5	1	1	3	12	14	−2	3
6	Universidad Católica	5	1	0	4	13	18	−5	2

=== Aggregate bottom standings ===
Pos	Team	Pld	W	D	L	GF	GA	GD	Pts	Relegation
7	Universidad Católica	27	10	6	11	59	52	+7	26	
8	Santiago Wanderers	27	8	8	11	42	46	−4	24	
9	Iberia	27	10	3	14	56	57	−1	23	
10	Magallanes	27	8	6	13	48	65	−17	22	
11	Green Cross	27	8	3	16	43	67	−24	19	
12	Ferrobádminton	27	6	3	18	44	78	−34	15	Relegated (Later revoked)

== Topscorer ==
Name	Team	Goals
(Chile) Carlos Tello	Audax Italiano	21
(Chile) Rubén Aguilera	Santiago Morning	21
