= Mauricio Pozo (footballer) =

Chilean footballer (born 1970)

Personal information
- Full name: Mauricio Andrés Pozo Quinteros
- Date of birth: 16 August 1970 (age 56)
- Place of birth: San Vicente de Tagua Tagua, Chile
- Height: 1.70 m (5 ft 7 in)
- Position: Defender

Senior career*
Years	Team	Apps	(Gls)
1990–1991	Magallanes		(4)
1992–2000	Deportes Concepción	119	(14)
1995	→ Rangers (loan)	26	(3)
1997	→ Unión Española (loan)	15	(3)
1997	→ Everton (loan)	5	(0)
2001–2002	Cobreloa	53	(1)
2003	Rangers	7	(1)
2006	Santiago Morning	10	(0)

International career
2001	Chile	4	(0)

Managerial career
- 2009: San Antonio Unido
- 2009: Santiago Morning (caretaker)
- 2014: Santiago Morning (assistant)
- 2015: Santiago Morning
- * Club domestic league appearances and goals

Mauricio Andrés Pozo Quinteros (born 16 August 1970) is a Chilean football manager and former player.

== Playing career ==
A defender, Pozo was capped four times for the Chile national team. He represented Chile in the 2001 Copa América held in Colombia.

== MAnagerial career ==
In November 2024, Pozo assumed as the sport manager of Cobreloa.

He also has served as coach for seven-a-side football club Big Ballers in the Chilean championship Legends Cup.

== Personal life ==
His younger brother, Pablo, and his father, Juan, are former professional referees as well as his youngest brother, Nicolás. Pablo officiated in the 2010 FIFA World Cup.

He is also the son-in-law of the former Chile international footballer and manager Guillermo Páez.

== Honours ==
Deportes Concepción

- Segunda División de Chile: 1994
