= Honorino Landa =

Chilean footballer (1942–1987)

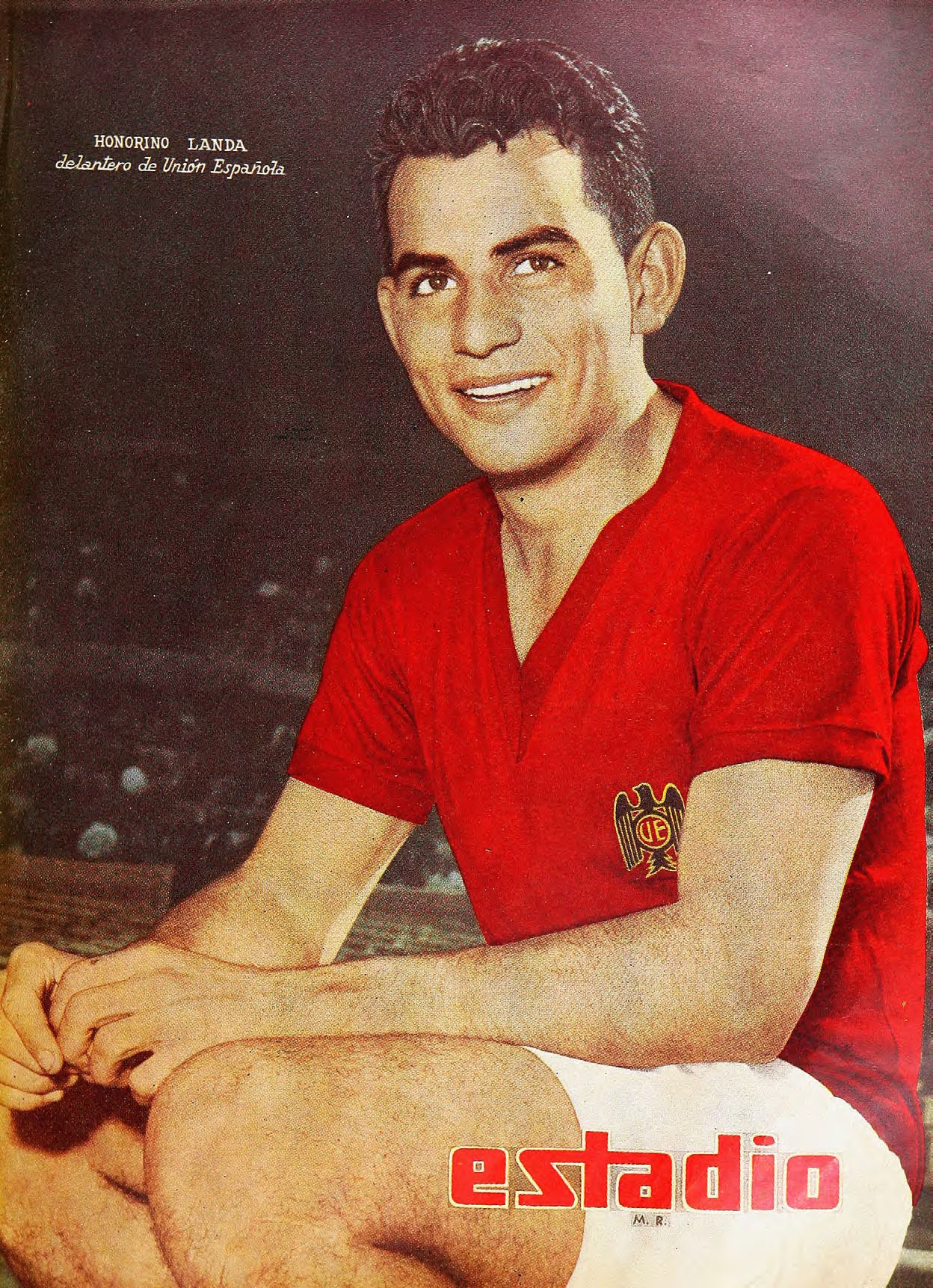
- Landa in 1960

Personal information
- Full name: Honorino Landa Vera
- Date of birth: June 1, 1942
- Place of birth: Puerto Natales, Chile
- Date of death: May 30, 1987 (aged 44)
- Position: Forward

Youth career
- Unión Española

Senior career*
Years	Team	Apps	(Gls)
1959–1965	Unión Española		(119)
1966–1967	Green Cross-Temuco	40	(34)
1968	Magallanes	12	(2)
1969	Unión Española	11	(3)
1970	Deportes La Serena	30	(9)
1971–1972	Huachipato	51	(16)
1973	Unión Española	23	(8)
1974	Aviación	6	(2)
Total			(193)

International career
1961–1966	Chile	16	(8)

Managerial career
- 1982–1983: Unión Española
Medal record
Men's football
Representing Chile
FIFA World Cup
Third place	1962 Chile
- * Club domestic league appearances and goals

Honorino Landa Vera (1 June 1942 – 30 May 1987) was a Chilean footballer who played as a forward.

== Club career ==
Once Landa received his high-school diploma in 1959, he went to play for the Unión Española team. In 1961, he scored 24 goals in the national championship; thanks to this, he was called up for the national team of his country. He stopped playing soccer in 1975.

== International career ==
Landa was the youngest player of the Chile national team that won a third place medal at the 1962 FIFA World Cup on home soil; during the tournament, he was one of the disgraced players directly involved in the Battle of Santiago incident during the Group 2 match between Chile and Italy. After only 12 minutes, Italy's Giorgio Ferrini committed a hard foul on Landa and was sent off, but refused to leave the pitch and had to be dragged off by policemen; Landa retaliated with a punch a few minutes later, but was not sent off. Chile won the match 2–0. Landa also represented Chile at the 1966 FIFA World Cup.

== Coaching career ==
From 1982 to 1983, he served as coach of Unión Española.

== Personal life ==
Landa was born in Puerto Natales to a Chilean mother and a Spanish father. His father, Javier Landa, was a trader who came to Chile at the end of the 1920s, starting a hardware store called Sociedad Landa y De Carlos (Landa and De Carlos Company).

He had two brothers, Javier Jr. and Félix. Félix was also a historical player for Unión Española.

== Death ==
Landa Vera died of cancer in a hospital in Santiago two days before his 45th birthday.
