= Campeonato de Campeones de Chile =

Football competition in Chile

- Founded: 1943
- Folded: 1945
- Region: Chile
- Most championships: Santiago Morning (2 titles)

The Campeonato de Campeones de Chile was an annual cup competition which was played annually between the First Division champion clubs.

It was organized by the Asociación Nacional de Fútbol Profesional (ACF), belonging to the Football Federation of Chile, and was played from 1943 to 1945.

== List of Champions ==
| Ed. | Year | Champion | Runner-up | Third Place | Fourth Place |
|---|---|---|---|---|---|
| 1 | 1943 | Santiago Morning | Audax Italiano | Colo-Colo | Magallanes |
| 2 | 1944 | Santiago Morning | Unión Española | Magallanes | Colo-Colo |
| 3 | 1945 | Colo-Colo | Unión Española | Santiago Morning | Audax Italiano |

== Titles by club ==
| Club | Titles | Runners-up | Seasons won | Seasons runner-up |
|---|---|---|---|---|
| Santiago Morning | 2 | — | 1943, 1944 | — |
| Colo-Colo | 1 | — | 1945 | — |
| Unión Española | — | 2 | — | 1944, 1945 |
| Audax Italiano | — | 1 | — | 1943 |

== 1943 Campeonato de Campeones ==
=== Standings ===
| Pos | Team | Pld | W | D | L | GF | GA | GD | Pts | Qualification or relegation | AUD | SMO | COL | UC | MAG |
|---|---|---|---|---|---|---|---|---|---|---|---|---|---|---|---|
| 1 | Audax Italiano | 4 | 2 | 2 | 0 | 9 | 6 | +3 | 6 | Final | — | 4–2 | 2–1 | — | — |
| 2 | Santiago Morning | 4 | 3 | 0 | 1 | 13 | 9 | +4 | 6 | Final | — | — | 4–3 | — | 3–1 |
| 3 | Colo-Colo | 4 | 2 | 0 | 2 | 8 | 7 | +1 | 4 | | — | — | — | 2–1 | 2–0 |
| 4 | Universidad de Chile | 4 | 0 | 2 | 2 | 7 | 11 | −4 | 2 | Fourth Place Playoff | 3–3 | 1–4 | — | — | — |
| 5 | Magallanes | 4 | 0 | 2 | 2 | 3 | 7 | −4 | 2 | Fourth Place Playoff | 0–0 | — | — | 2–2 | — |

Updated to match(es) played on unknown. Source:
Rules for classification: 1) points; 2) goal difference; 3) number of goals scored.

=== Fourth Place playoff ===
| Team 1 | Score | Team 2 |
|---|---|---|
| Magallanes | 3–2 | Universidad de Chile |

=== Final ===
| Team 1 | Score | Team 2 |
|---|---|---|
| Santiago Morning | 3–1 | Audax Italiano |

== 1944 Campeonato de Campeones ==
=== Standings ===
| Pos | Team | Pld | W | D | L | GF | GA | GD | Pts | Qualification or relegation | SMO | UES | MAG | COL | AUD | UC |
|---|---|---|---|---|---|---|---|---|---|---|---|---|---|---|---|---|
| 1 | Santiago Morning | 5 | 4 | 0 | 1 | 14 | 8 | +6 | 8 | Champion | — | — | — | 5–2 | 2–1 | 4–2 |
| 2 | Unión Española | 5 | 3 | 0 | 2 | 10 | 10 | 0 | 6 | | 2–1 | — | 2–0 | 2–1 | — | — |
| 3 | Magallanes | 5 | 2 | 1 | 2 | 9 | 9 | 0 | 5 | | 1–2 | — | — | 3–2 | — | — |
| 4 | Colo-Colo | 5 | 2 | 0 | 3 | 13 | 13 | 0 | 4 | | — | — | — | — | 3–2 | 5–1 |
| 5 | Audax Italiano | 5 | 2 | 0 | 3 | 12 | 13 | −1 | 4 | | — | 4–3 | 1–3 | — | — | — |
| 6 | Universidad de Chile | 5 | 1 | 1 | 3 | 11 | 16 | −5 | 3 | | — | 4–1 | 2–2 | — | 2–4 | — |

Updated to match(es) played on unknown. Source:
Rules for classification: 1) points; 2) goal difference; 3) number of goals scored.

== 1945 Campeonato de Campeones ==
=== Standings ===
| Pos | Team | Pld | W | D | L | GF | GA | GD | Pts | Qualification or relegation | COL | UES | SMO | AUD | UC | MAG |
|---|---|---|---|---|---|---|---|---|---|---|---|---|---|---|---|---|
| 1 | Colo-Colo | 5 | 4 | 1 | 0 | 15 | 8 | +7 | 9 | Champion | — | — | — | 6–4 | 1–1 | — |
| 2 | Unión Española | 5 | 3 | 0 | 2 | 13 | 7 | +6 | 6 | | 0–1 | — | — | — | — | 3–1 |
| 3 | Santiago Morning | 5 | 3 | 0 | 2 | 19 | 15 | +4 | 6 | | 3–5 | 1–3 | — | 6–3 | — | — |
| 4 | Audax Italiano | 5 | 3 | 0 | 2 | 15 | 16 | −1 | 6 | | — | 3–2 | — | — | 2–0 | 3–2 |
| 5 | Universidad de Chile | 5 | 1 | 1 | 3 | 7 | 16 | −9 | 3 | | — | 1–5 | 2–6 | — | — | 3–2 |
| 6 | Magallanes | 5 | 0 | 0 | 5 | 7 | 14 | −7 | 0 | | 0–2 | — | 2–3 | — | — | — |

Updated to match(es) played on unknown. Source:
Rules for classification: 1) points; 2) goal difference; 3) number of goals scored.

== Sources ==
- Chile - List of Cup Winners and Runners Up
