= Estadio Huachipato-CAP Acero =

Association football stadium in Talcahuano, Chile

Coordinates: 36°45′20″S 73°06′26″W

- CAP
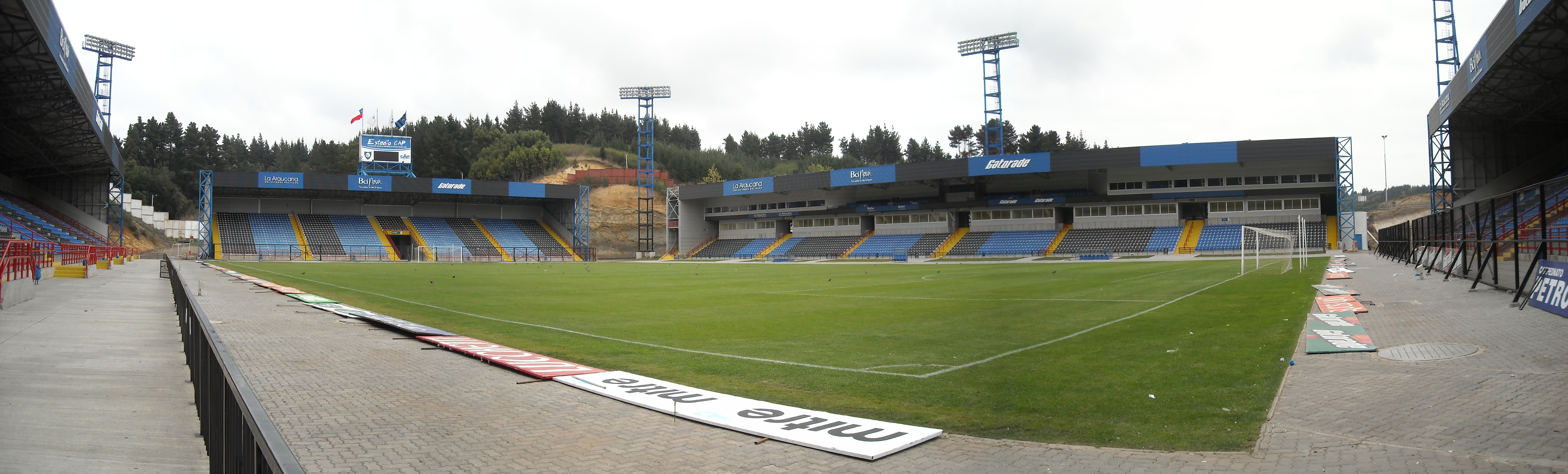
- Interactive map of Estadio Huachipato-CAP Acero
- Full name: Estadio Huachipato-CAP Acero
- Former names: Estadio CAP
- Location: Talcahuano, Chile
- Owner: CAP S.A. Huachipato
- Capacity: 10,032
- Surface: Grass
- Field size: 110 x 70 m

Construction
- Opened: September 27, 2009 (unofficially), November 4, 2009 (official)
- Cost: US$11 million
- Project manager: Víctor Bustos

Tenant
- Huachipato (2009–present)

Estadio Huachipato-CAP Acero (Compañía de Acero del Pacífico), known until 2015 as Estadio CAP, is a football stadium located in Talcahuano, Chile. Inaugurated in 2009, it is the home field of Huachipato, replacing Estadio Las Higueras, which was demolished in 2008. The stadium capacity is 10,500 people (all-seated).

Due to the effects of the 2010 Chile earthquake that severely damaged Estadio El Morro, Naval played their home matches in Huachipato-CAP Acero until 2012. The stadium is also rented by other teams as a neutral ground for football matches when their own grounds are unavailable.
