= Ulises Ojeda =

Argentine footballer

Personal information
- Full name: Ulises Rodrigo Ojeda
- Date of birth: 2 November 1995 (age 31)
- Place of birth: Buenos Aires, Argentina
- Height: 1.70 m (5 ft 7 in)
- Position: Attacking midfielder

Team information
- Current team: Deportes Concepción

Youth career
- Huracán

Senior career*
Years	Team	Apps	(Gls)
2018–2021	Cañuelas	26	(1)
2022	Estudiantes SL	24	(3)
2022	EFI Juniors	7	(1)
2023	Cipolletti	7	(0)
2023–2024	Huracán San Rafael	8	(3)
2024	Cañuelas	19	(6)
2024–	Deportes Concepción	43	(4)
2026	→ Unión Española (loan)	11	(3)
- * Club domestic league appearances and goals as of 17 September 2026

Ulises Rodrigo Ojeda (born 2 November 1995) is an Argentine professional footballer who plays as an attacking midfielder for Chilean club Deportes Concepción.

== Club career ==
Born in Buenos Aires, Argentina, Ojeda was with Huracán as a youth player until he suffered a tibia and fibula fracture at the age of 18. Next, he suffered an ACL injury. Once he got over the injury, he joined Cañuelas, winning the 2020 Primera C Metropolitana.

Following Cañuelas, Ojeda played in his homeland for Estudiantes de San Luis, EFI Juniors, Cipolletti, Huracán de San Rafael and Cañuelas again.

In June 2024, Ojeda moved to Chile and signed with Deportes Concepción, winning the 2024 Segunda División Profesional. In January 2026, he was loaned out to Unión Española. In September of the same year, he had to end his loan due to residency issues.
