= 1943 Campeonato Nacional Primera División =

Campeonato Nacional de Fútbol Profesional
- Dates: 21 May 1943 – 20 November 1943
- Champions: Unión Española (1st title)
- Matches: 90
- Goals: 387 (4.3 per match)
- Top goalscorer: Luis Machuca; Víctor Mancilla (17 goals)
- Biggest away win: Santiago National 2–8 Colo-Colo (20 June)
- Total attendance: 422,033
- Average attendance: 4,689

The 1943 Campeonato Nacional de Fútbol Profesional was Chilean first tier’s 11th season. Unión Española was the tournament’s champion, winning its first title.

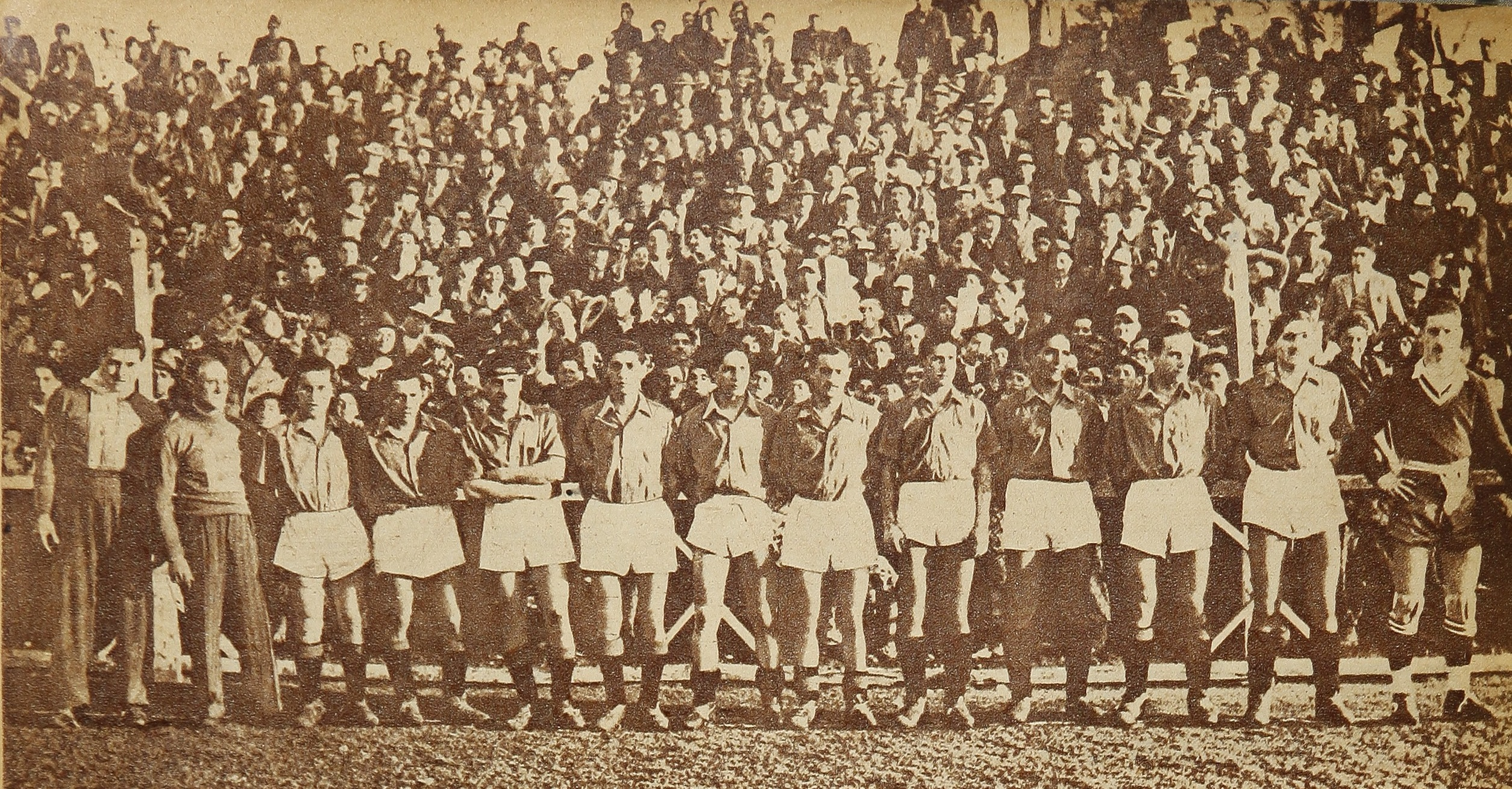
Unión Española's 1943 champion team

== Scores ==
	AUD	BAD	COL	GCR	MAG	SMO	SNA	UES	UCA	UCH
Audax		1–3	0–2	3–4	1–1	2–1	4–1	2–0	1–1	0–3
Bádminton	4–3		0–0	2–5	2–2	4–3	3–0	2–2	0–2	1–1
Colo-Colo	2–0	0–3		3–0	1–2	7–1	4–3	1–2	7–1	2–0
Green Cross	5–4	3–2	3–4		3–2	2–3	2–1	2–2	3–2	2–3
Magallanes	2–0	3–1	1–4	5–3		4–2	3–0	1–1	0–1	4–2
S. Morning	1–3	2–1	2–0	4–3	2–7		2–2	2–4	4–5	4–0
S. National	1–1	4–2	2–8	2–3	2–4	3–6		2–3	2–1	1–4
U. Española	2–2	3–1	2–2	3–1	2–1	2–2	1–0		3–2	1–1
U. Católica	2–2	3–0	3–3	5–3	2–2	1–3	2–1	1–5		1–1
U. de Chile	0–0	2–5	1–1	1–4	0–3	1–1	2–1	1–1	1–2	

== Standings ==
Pos	Team	Pld	W	D	L	GF	GA	GD	Pts	Qualification
1	Unión Española	18	9	8	1	39	26	+13	26	Champions
2	Colo-Colo	18	10	4	4	51	26	+25	24	
3	Magallanes	18	10	4	4	47	29	+18	24	
4	Green Cross	18	9	1	8	51	51	0	19	
5	Universidad Católica	18	7	5	6	37	41	−4	19	
6	Santiago Morning	18	7	3	8	45	51	−6	17	
7	Badminton	18	6	4	8	36	39	−3	16	
8	Universidad de Chile	18	4	7	7	24	34	−10	15	
9	Audax Italiano	18	4	6	8	29	35	−6	14	
10	Santiago National	18	2	2	14	28	55	−27	6	

Campeonato Profesional
1943 champions

Unión Española
1st title

== Topscorer ==
Name	Team	Goals
(Chile) Luis Machuca	Unión Española	17
(Chile) Víctor Mancilla	Universidad Católica	17
