= Mitchell Wassenne =

Chilean footballer (born 2001)

Personal information
- Full name: Mitchell Andrés Wassenne Turres
- Date of birth: 19 April 2001 (age 25)
- Place of birth: Quilpué, Chile
- Height: 1.72 m (5 ft 8 in)
- Position: Forward

Team information
- Current team: Unión Española
- Number: 20

Youth career
- 2010–2013: Santiago Wanderers
- 2013–2016: San Luis
- 2016–2020: Everton

Senior career*
Years	Team	Apps	(Gls)
2021–2024	Everton	27	(0)
2022	→ Deportes Santa Cruz (loan)	11	(0)
2023	→ San Antonio Unido (loan)	18	(1)
2025	Concón National	21	(6)
2026–	Unión Española	0	(0)
- * Club domestic league appearances and goals as of 3 January 2026

Mitchell Andrés Wassenne Turres (19 April 2001) is a Chilean footballer who plays as a forward for Unión Española.

== Club career ==
Born in Quilpué, Chile, Wassenne was with Santiago Wanderers and San Luis de Quillota before joining Everton de Viña del Mar in June 2016. He made his senior debut in the 2021 Chilean Primera División and signed his first professional contract on 5 February 2022.

Wassenne was loaned out to Deportes Santa Cruz in July 2022 and San Antonio Unido in 2023. He ended his contract with Everton at the end of the 2024 season.

On 3 March 2025, Wassenne signed with Concón National. At the end of the season, he was related to Unión Española.

In January 2026, Wassenne joined Unión Española.
