= Víctor Pizarro =

Chilean footballer (born 1950)

Personal information
- Full name: Víctor Pizarro
- Date of birth: 16 April 1950 (age 76)
- Place of birth: Chile
- Position: Forward

Senior career*
Years	Team	Apps	(Gls)
1975	O'Higgins	1	(0)
1975	Santiago Morning	34	(27)
1976–1977	Unión Española	45	(15)
1978–1979	O'Higgins	50	(13)
1980	Green Cross Temuco	18	(7)

International career
1975–1976	Chile	3	(0)
- * Club domestic league appearances and goals as of 5 December 2015

Víctor Pizarro was a Chilean footballer.

== Honours ==
=== Club ===
Unión Española

- Primera División de Chile (1): 1977

=== Individual ===
- Primera División de Chile Top-Scorer (1): 1975
