= Luis Larraza =

Spanish footballer

Personal information
- Full name: Luis Larraza Sesma
- Date of birth: 1915
- Place of birth: Gipuzkoa, Spain
- Date of death: 8 October 2004
- Place of death: Chile
- Position: Forward

Senior career*
Years	Team	Apps	(Gls)
- Vasconia
1935	Donostia	13	(3)
1939–1941	Santiago Morning		
1942	Universidad Católica	13	(4)
1943–1945	Santiago National		
- * Club domestic league appearances and goals

Luis Larraza Sesma (1915 – 8 October 2004), known as Larraza, was a Spanish professional footballer who played as a forward for clubs in Spain and Chile.

== Career ==
Born in Gipuzkoa, Spain, Larraza played for Vasconia before joining Donostia in 1935. He made his debut for Donostia in a 2–0 away loss against Real Madrid on 24 February 1935 in the Spanish Primera División.

In 1939, Larraza moved to Chile, where he played in the Chilean Primera División for Santiago Morning, Universidad Católica and Santiago National.

== Personal life and death ==
Larraza came to Chile in 1939 aboard the SS Winnipeg as a refugee from the Francoist repression. He married Purificación Alberdi Barnechea, also known as Garbiñe Alberdi, who was also of Basque origin. They settled in Chile. Larraza died on 8 October 2004, aged 89.
