= 1974 Campeonato Nacional Segunda División =

Segunda División
- Season: 1974
- Champions: Santiago Morning
- Promoted: Santiago Morning; Everton
- Relegated: Coquimbo Unido

The 1974 Segunda División de Chile was the 23rd season of the Segunda División de Chile.

Santiago Morning was the tournament's champion.

== First phase ==
=== Group North ===
Pos	Team	Pld	W	D	L	GF	GA	GD	Pts	Qualification
1	Everton	14	7	4	3	26	16	+10	18	Qualified to Championship Playoffs for the promotion to 1975 Primera División de Chile
2	Audax Italiano	14	8	2	4	24	17	+7	18	Qualified to Championship Playoffs for the promotion to 1975 Primera División de Chile
3	Trasandino	14	7	2	5	26	20	+6	16	Qualified to Championship Playoffs for the promotion to 1975 Primera División de Chile
4	Deportes Ovalle	14	6	4	4	18	15	+3	16	
5	San Luis de Quillota	14	5	4	5	23	23	0	14	
6	Universidad Católica	14	5	3	6	16	19	−3	13	
7	San Antonio Unido	14	3	3	8	15	26	−11	9	
8	Coquimbo Unido	14	1	6	7	14	26	−12	8	Relegation Playoffs

Source: rsssf.com

=== Group South ===
Pos	Team	Pld	W	D	L	GF	GA	GD	Pts	Qualification
1	Santiago Morning	14	8	3	3	27	15	+12	19	Qualified to Championship Playoffs for the promotion to 1975 Primera División de Chile
2	Ferroviarios	14	8	3	3	24	14	+10	19	Qualified to Championship Playoffs for the promotion to 1975 Primera División de Chile
3	Ñublense	14	5	6	3	14	13	+1	16	Qualified to Championship Playoffs for the promotion to 1975 Primera División de Chile
4	Independiente	14	5	5	4	15	17	−2	15	
5	Iberia Biobío	14	4	5	5	15	17	−2	13	
6	Curicó Unido	14	4	4	6	14	17	−3	12	
7	Linares Unido	14	2	7	5	24	28	−4	11	
8	Malleco Unido	14	1	5	8	15	27	−12	7	Relegation Playoffs

Source: rsssf.com

== Second phase ==
=== Championship playoffs ===
Pos	Team	Pld	W	D	L	GF	GA	GD	Pts	Promotion
1	Santiago Morning (C)	10	5	4	1	21	9	+12	14	Champions. Promoted to 1975 Primera División de Chile
2	Everton (P)	10	5	4	1	19	12	+7	14	Promoted to 1975 Primera División de Chile
3	Ferroviarios	10	5	2	3	18	14	+4	12	
4	Ñublense	10	1	5	4	10	17	−7	7	
5	Audax Italiano	10	2	3	5	12	21	−9	7	
6	Trasandino	10	2	2	6	14	21	−7	6	

Source: rsssf.com
(C) Champions; (P) Promoted

== See also ==
- Chilean football league system
