= Manuel Rodríguez (footballer) =

Chilean footballer (1939-2018)

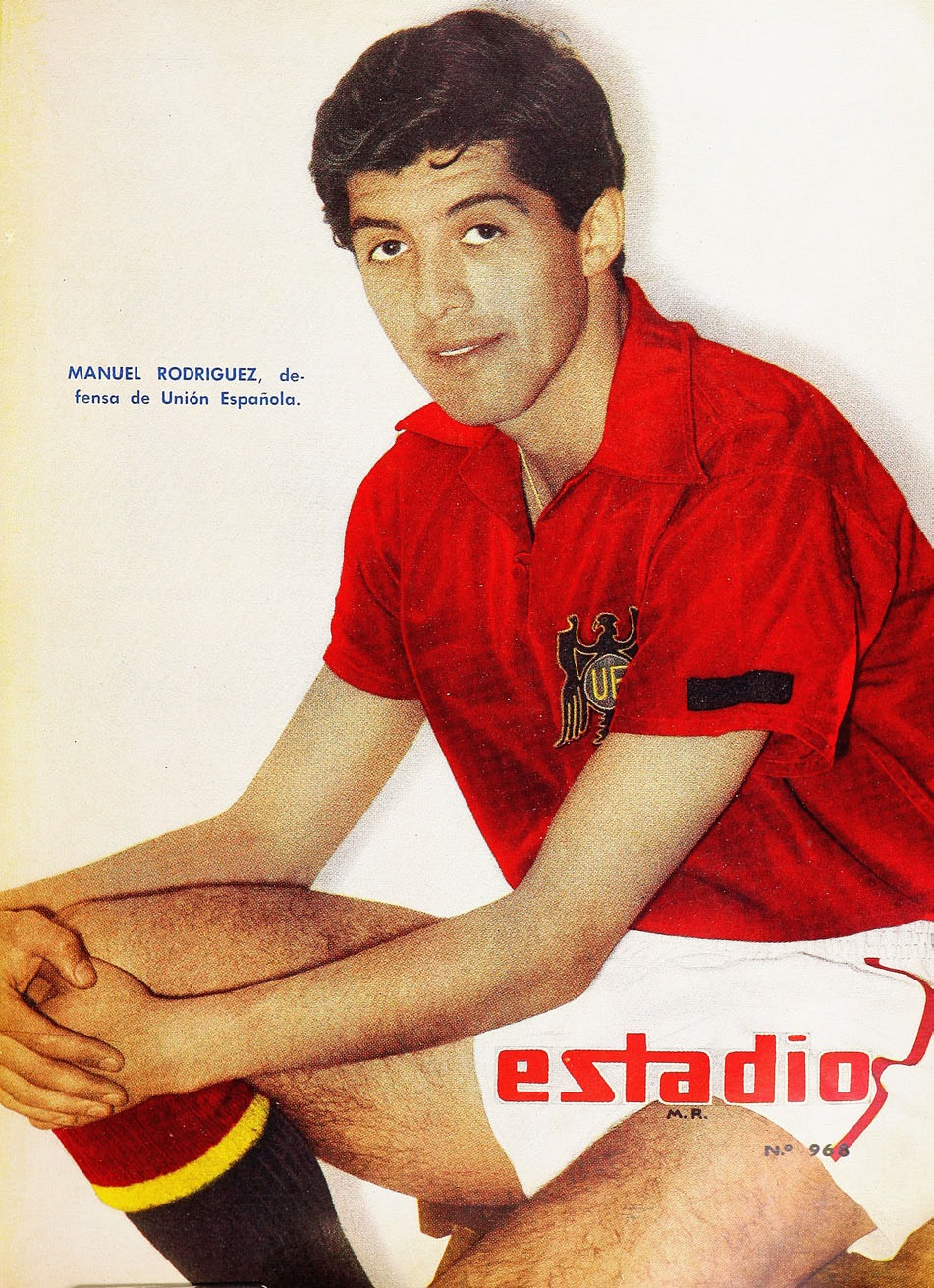

Personal information
- Full name: Manuel Rodríguez Araneda
- Date of birth: January 18, 1939
- Place of birth: Santiago, Chile
- Date of death: September 26, 2018 (aged 79)
- Position: Defender

Senior career*
Years	Team	Apps	(Gls)
1955–1972	Unión Española		

International career
1961–1963	Chile	8	(0)

Managerial career
- 1980: Deportes Arica
- 1981: Regional Atacama
- 1982: Deportes Antofagasta
- 1983–1988: Cobresal
- 1989–1991: Unión Española
- 1993–1994: Cobresal
- 1995–1996: Coquimbo Unido
- 1997–1998: Deportes Iquique
- 1998: Everton
- 1999: Coquimbo Unido
- 2000–2001: Magallanes
- 2006: Unión Española
Medal record
Men's football
Representing Chile
FIFA World Cup
Third place	1962 Chile
- * Club domestic league appearances and goals

Manuel Rodríguez Araneda (18 January 1939 – 26 September 2018) was a Chilean football defender who played for Chile in the 1962 FIFA World Cup. As a footballer, he played for Unión Española.

== Personal life ==
Rodríguez was nicknamed El Guerrillero (Guerrilla) after the Chilean guerrilla leader Manuel Rodríguez Erdoíza.
