= Sebastián Pereira =

Chilean footballer (born 1999)

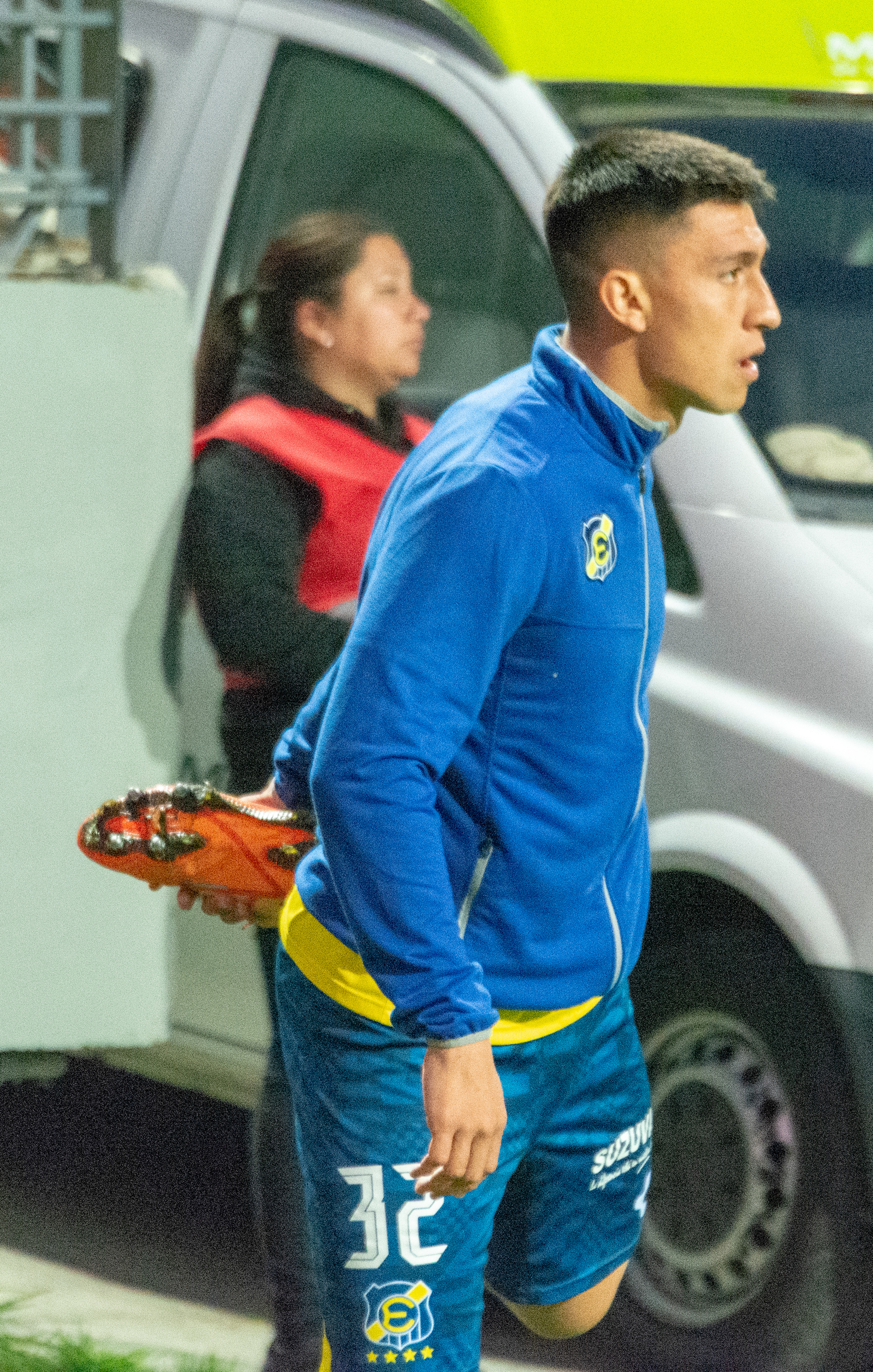
- Pereira with Everton in 2023

Personal information
- Full name: Sebastián Ernesto Pereira Arredondo
- Date of birth: 14 January 1999 (age 27)
- Place of birth: Valparaíso, Chile
- Height: 1.86 m (6 ft 1 in)
- Position: Centre-back

Team information
- Current team: Unión Española
- Number: 21

Youth career
- 2009–2011: Santiago Wanderers
- 2012–2018: Everton

Senior career*
Years	Team	Apps	(Gls)
2018–2024	Everton	74	(5)
2022	→ Unión La Calera (loan)	8	(0)
2023	→ Audax Italiano (loan)	10	(0)
2025–	Unión Española	18	(1)
- * Club domestic league appearances and goals as of 11 March 2026

Sebastián Ernesto Pereira Arredondo (born 14 January 1999) is a Chilean professional footballer who plays as a centre-back for Unión Española.

== Club career ==
As a youth player, Pereira was with Santiago Wanderers before joining the Everton de Viña del Mar youth system.

In June 2022, Pereira was loaned out to Unión La Calera from Everton de Viña del Mar until the end of the season. In 2023, he was loaned out to Audax Italiano.

Pereira signed with Unión Española for the 2025 season.

== International career ==
In September 2020, Pereira was called up to a training microcycle of the Chile national team under Reinaldo Rueda.

== Career statistics ==
As of 13 September 2020

Appearances and goals by club, season and competition
Club	Season	League			Cup		Continental		Other		Total	
Club	Season	Division	Apps	Goals	Apps	Goals	Apps	Goals	Apps	Goals	Apps	Goals
Everton	2018	Chilean Primera División	0	0	2 (Note: Appearances in the Copa Chile)	0	0	0	0	0	2	0
Everton	2019	Chilean Primera División	3	0	1	0	0	0	0	0	4	0
Everton	2020	Chilean Primera División	10	0	0	0	0	0	0	0	10	0
Career total			13	0	3	0	0	0	0	0	16	0
