= Tricolor Municipal de Paine =

Tricolor Municipal
- Full name: Club Deportivo Tricolor Municipal de Paine
- Founded: March 16, 1910
- Ground: Municipal de Paine; Paine, Chile
- Capacity: 2 500 spectators
- Chairman: Felipe Silva
- Manager: Cesar Fuentes
- League: Tercera División B
- 2021: Play-Off Semifinal
Home colours	Away colours

Club Deportivo Tricolor Municipal de Paine, commonly referred to as Tricolor Municipal, is a professional football club based in Paine, Chile.

== Kits ==
- Home Kit: Red and white stripes shirt, blue shorts and blue socks.
- Away Kit: Blue shirt, white shorts and white socks.

== Honours ==
=== National ===
Tercera División (1)

1943

Cuarta División (1)

1990

=== Regional ===
Regional Central (1)

1958

== Bibliography ==
- Gatica Wierman, Héctor (2019). Almanaque del Fútbol Chileno. Clubes. Hueders. ISBN 9789563651140.

== External ==
- (in Spanish) Tricolor Municipal on Instagram
