= Leonardo Zamora =

Footballer (born 1975)

Personal information
- Full name: Leonardo Harum Zamora Amaro
- Date of birth: 14 December 1975 (age 50)
- Place of birth: San Felipe, Chile
- Height: 1.81 m (5 ft 11 in)
- Position: Goalkeeper

Senior career*
Years	Team	Apps	(Gls)
1994–1996	Universidad de Chile		
1997–1998	Deportes Temuco		
1999–2003	Everton		
2004–2005	Utah Blitzz		
2006	Real Salt Lake		
2007–2009	Ñublense		
2010	Rangers		
2010–2011	Smouha		
2011	Curicó Unido		

International career
2003–2006	Palestine	6	(0)

Managerial career
- 2011–2012: Barnechea (assistant)
- 2013: Chile U20 (assistant)
- 2014: Huachipato (assistant)
- 2015–2017: Universidad Católica (assistant)
- 2018: Rangers
- 2020: Barnechea
- * Club domestic league appearances and goals

Leonardo Harum Zamora Amaro (born 14 December 1975) is a former professional footballer who played as a goalkeeper. Born in Chile, he made six appearances for the Palestine national team.

== International career ==
Zamora made his debut with the Palestine national team on 24 September 2003 against Qatar, in a 2004 AFC Asian Cup Qualifying match. Also he was substitute in a World Cup 2006 Qualifying match against Uzbekistan on 8 September 2004.

== Coaching career ==
=== Assistant coach to Mario Salas ===
After retiring, Zamora began working with Mario Salas. He was his assistant at A.C. Barnechea between 2011 and 2012, then for Chile U20 in the 2013 FIFA U-20 World Cup and Huachipato in 2014.

He was also Salas' assistant between 2015 and 2017, who he won the 2016 Torneo Clausura and 2016 Torneo Apertura with. They left the club at the end of 2017 when Salas accepted and offer from Sporting Cristal in Peru, which he accepted. However, Zamora decided to stay in Chile and separate with Salas, with whom he had been working under for several years.

=== Rangers de Talca ===
Zamora was hired in his first job as a head coach by his former club, Rangers de Talca, on 23 December 2017. Zamora decided to resign on 30 July 2018 due to bad results and a horrible relationship with the club's fans.

=== Barnechea ===
On 21 December 2019, it was confirmed that Zamora had been appointed head coach of A.C. Barnechea. He was released at the beginning of 2020.

== Honours ==
=== Player ===
Universidad de Chile

- Primera División de Chile: 1995
