= Héctor Pinto =

Chilean footballer and manager (born 1951)

Personal information
- Full name: Héctor Hernán Pinto Lara
- Date of birth: 12 June 1951 (age 75)
- Place of birth: Buin, Chile
- Height: 1.78 m (5 ft 10 in)
- Position: Midfielder

Senior career*
Years	Team	Apps	(Gls)
1970–1976	Universidad de Chile	134	(33)
1977–1978	Colo-Colo	52	(14)
1979–1984	Unión Española	108	(20)

Managerial career
- 1986–1988: Unión Española
- 1989–1993: Universidad Católica (youth)
- 1994–1996: Universidad Católica (assistant)
- 1996: Universidad Católica (interim)
- 1998: Palestino (assistant)
- 1998–1999: Chile U17
- 2000: Chile U23
- 2000: Chile Olympic (assistant)
- 2001–2002: Chile U20
- 2004–2005: Universidad de Chile
- 2007: Unión Española
- 2007–2008: Universidad de Chile (youth)
- 2009–2012: Cruz Azul (youth)
- 2014: Deportes Iquique
- 2017–2018: Hebei China Fortune (assistant)
- * Club domestic league appearances and goals

Héctor Hernán Pinto Lara (born 12 June 1951) is a Chilean former footballer and manager.

== Coaching career ==
Following his retirement as a player, Pinto started his career with Unión Española in 1986.

Pinto stood out as manager of Universidad de Chile in 2004.

In addition to senior teams, Pinto is better known by coaching youth teams of clubs such as Universidad Católica, Universidad de Chile and Cruz Azul. He also led the Chile national teams at under-17, under-23 and under-20 levels.

In January 2017 he flew to China at the request of Chilean coach Manuel Pellegrini to be the manager of the reserve team of Hebei Fortune and will work closely with Pellegrini to promote players to the first division side, which Pellegrini currently manages.

== Honours ==
=== Manager ===
Universidad de Chile

- Torneo Apertura: 2004
