= Julio Crisosto =

Chilean footballer (born 1950)

Personal information
- Full name: Julio Alberto Crisosto Zárate
- Date of birth: 21 March 1950 (age 76)
- Place of birth: Iquique, Chile
- Position: Forward

Youth career
- Libertad Iquique
- Boca Juniors Iquique
- Universidad Católica

Senior career*
Years	Team	Apps	(Gls)
1969–1973	Universidad Católica	104	(38)
1974–1979	Colo Colo	171	(96)
1980–1981	Los Náuticos	46	(12)
1981	Panathinaikos		
1982–1983	Deportes Arica	17	(8)
1983	Santiago Wanderers	0	(0)
1983	Deportes Linares	12	(0)

International career
1971-1977	Chile	27	(11)
- * Club domestic league appearances and goals

Julio Alberto Crisosto Zárate (born 21 March 1950) is a Chilean former professional footballer who played as a Forward five clubs in Chile and the Chile national team in the 1975 Copa América.

== Career ==
- Universidad Católica 1970-1973
- Colo Colo 1974-1979
- Los Náuticos 1980-81
- Panathinaikos 1981
- Deportes Arica 1982–83
- Santiago Wanderers 1983
- Deportes Linares 1983

== Honours ==
Colo Colo

- Chilean Primera División: 1979
- Copa Chile: 1974

Chile

- Copa Juan Pinto Durán: 1971
- Copa Carlos Dittborn: 1973
- Copa Leoncio Provoste: 1973
- Copa Acosta Ñu: 1974

Individual

- Chilean Championship top scorer: 1974
