= Estadio Las Higueras =

Former football stadium in Talcahuano, Chile

- Interactive map of Estadio Las Higueras
- Coordinates: 36°45′20″S 73°06′26″W
- Owner: Compañía Siderúrgica Huachipato
- Capacity: 10,000
- Surface: grass
- Field size: 110 x 70 m

Construction
- Built: 1960
- Opened: November 25, 1961
- Closed: 2008
- Demolished: 2008

Tenant
- Huachipato (1960-2008)

Estadio Las Higueras was a football stadium in Talcahuano, Chile. It was the home ground of Huachipato from 1960 until 2008, when it closed after its last match was played on July 19 and demolished later in the same year. The Estadio Huachipato-CAP Acero was built in its place, and it was inaugurated in 2009. The stadium held 10,000 people.
