= Carlos Sintas =

Uruguayan footballer (born 1952)

Carlos Alberto Sintas (born 31 December 1952 in Montevideo, Uruguay) is a Uruguayan former professional footballer who played as a forward in Uruguay, Chile and Austria. He was part of the Huachipato team which won the 1974 Campeonato Nacional Primera División.

== Career ==
- Tacuarembó 1966–1973
- Huachipato 1973–1976
- Ñublense 1976–1978
- Austria Wien 1978–1979

== Honours ==
Huachipato

- Chilean Primera División: 1974
