= Santiago Morning =

Association football club in Chile

- Full name: Club de Deportes Santiago Morning
- Nicknames: Chaguito Morning; Los Bohemios (The Bohemians); Los Microbuseros (The [Urban] Bus Drivers); La V Negra (The Black V)
- Founded: October 16, 1903; 122 years ago (as Santiago Football Club)
- Ground: Estadio Municipal de La Pintana, La Pintana, Santiago
- Capacity: 5,000
- Chairman: Miguel Nasur
- Manager: Cristian Febre
- League: Segunda División Profesional
- 2025: Primera B, 16th of 16 (relegated)
- Website: www.santiagomorning.cl
Home colours	Away colours

Club de Deportes Santiago Morning (popularly known as Chaguito Morning or Morning) is a Chilean professional football club based in Recoleta, Santiago currently playing in Primera B.

== History ==
=== Foundation and amateur era ===
In 1903, Santiago formed its own football association. This association had antecedents in the neighbors of Cousino Park (current O'Higgins Park) and some Santiago College students, led by a professor, Mister Vincent, who put on a demonstration at Mars Field, which allowed the club to begin to attract more participants.

On 16 October 1903, the club was formed thanks to the management of the students the club was founded as Santiago Football Club. The team played its first match against the teacher's team, three days later on 19 October. In 1928, the club won the amateur league (Liga Central de Football).

Four years later, in 1907, Morning Star was founded, based in the Independencia neighborhood. Its uniform was a blue kit and white shorts.

In 1933, the team was one of eight that founded the Chilean Primera División and the first team in play a professional match, in 3–1 loss against Audax Italiano at Estadio Santa Laura. In its first professional season (1933), the team finished in sixth place. In 1935, the club was relegated to the Serie B, after finishing in 12th place.

=== The rise and fall ===
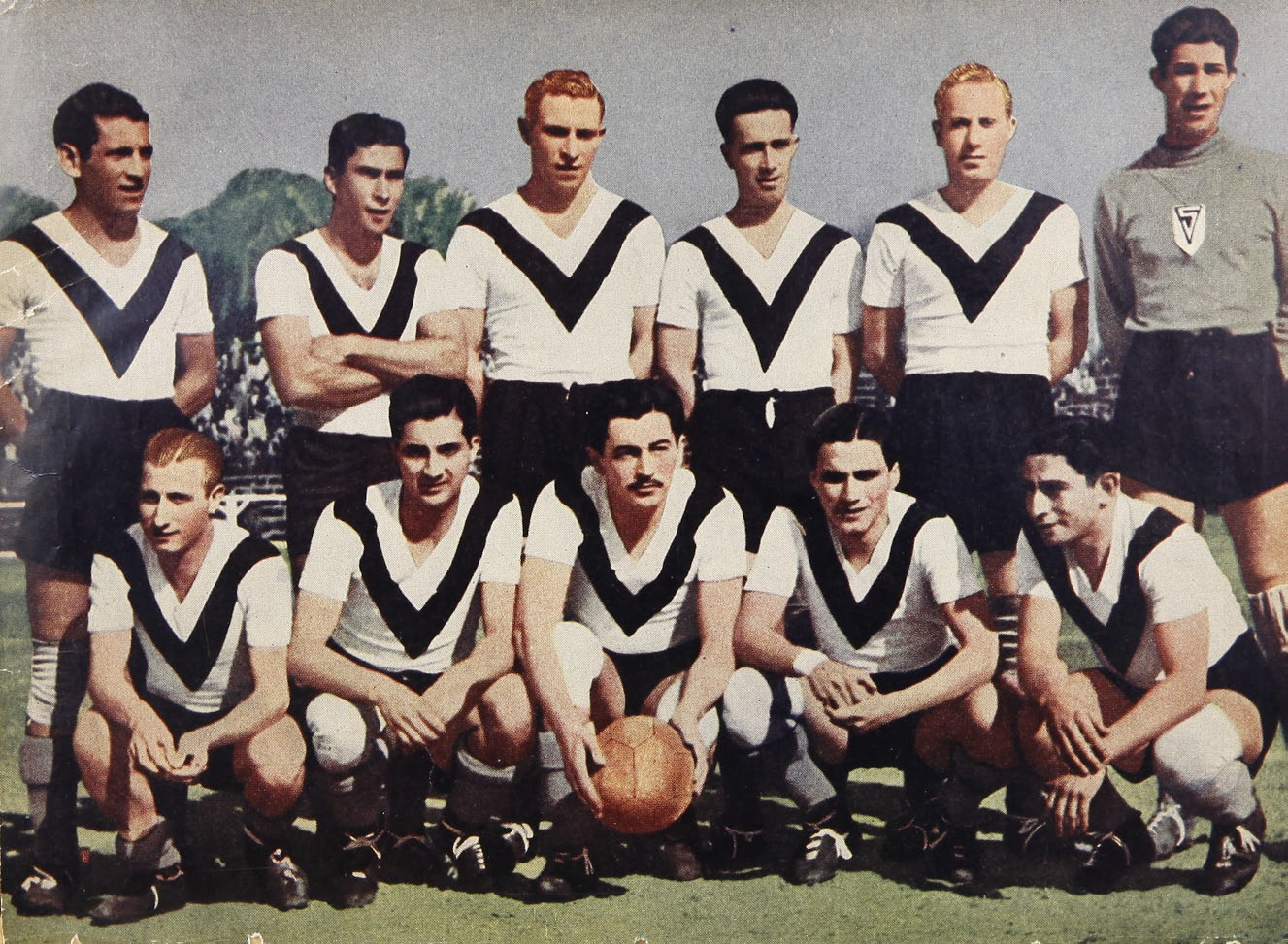
Santiago Morning's lineup prior to a match against Audax Italiano in 1942.

In March 1936, after the merger of Santiago FC and Morning Star founded Santiago Morning. The first professional game of the team was in the same year, in a 2–1 win against his rival Magallanes. In the same, the club played his first season and finished 4th of six teams, making a similar tournament in the next season.

Of six teams participants, Santiago Morning finished once in the 4th place, same place that the team achieved in 1936 and 1937. The success and the illusion were announced in the 1939 season, when that Morning achieved the second place in the positions table with notable victories to Green Cross for 7–5, to his rival Magallanes for 6–5, to Metropolitano 7–1 and a most remembered victory to Universidad Católica for 8–2, where the famous goalkeeper Sergio Livingstone played. In 1941, the club makes a similar season, but with lower goal difference.

The club win its first title in 1942, finishing in the first place of the table with 29 points over his rival Magallanes with 28 points. In the same tournament, Santiago Morning had highlighted players in his squad as Raúl Toro, best player of Morning's history and Domingo Romo goalscorer of the team and the tournament with 16 goals. In this tournament, also highlighted the victories 5–1 to Audax Italiano, to Santiago Badminton for 4–0, 5–1 to Magallanes and Unión Española, 7–3 to Santiago National and 3 goals scored to the universities.

In the tournament of 1943, Morning can't repeat the title of the last season, achieving the sixth place in the table with 17 points. In the next season, the club finish in the third place with Magallanes (both teams with 29 points) was only two points of the champion Colo-Colo, who had 31 points. After many irregular seasons, in early 1950s, the club qualified to the championship play-off.

In 1956 season the club struggled, finishing in bottom of the table (12th place) with 14 points under Ferrobadminton, being relegated to the Second Division for the first time ever. Morning remained in the second tier only three years, until 1959. The second spell in the top flight lasted 11 seasons, before another relegation in 1970. In the 1970s, the club only played three seasons in Primera, suffering one relegation and before of the club's promotion in 1974, Morning remaining this four years. In 1981, the club gained promotion to Primera for the next season, but the club wasn't able to maintain top flight status and bounced back to the second level. In 1983, Morning struggled again and were relegated to Tercera División, and made history as the first Primera División Champion to play in the third tier of Chilean Football, by the time a semi-professional league.

The club remained as amateur, facing financial difficulties, until 1996. In 1994, the team had a golden chance for return to the professional football, but the team loss with Curicó Unido at the final, after a dramatic definition. Two years later, the club was crowned champions of Tercera División, being promoting to Primera B, thus regaining professional status.

After two seasons in Primera B, with the former footballer Jorge Aravena as coach, the club achieved promotes to the first level after 14 years of absence in this category, after of won to Provincial Osorno in the promotion play-offs.

=== 2000s ===
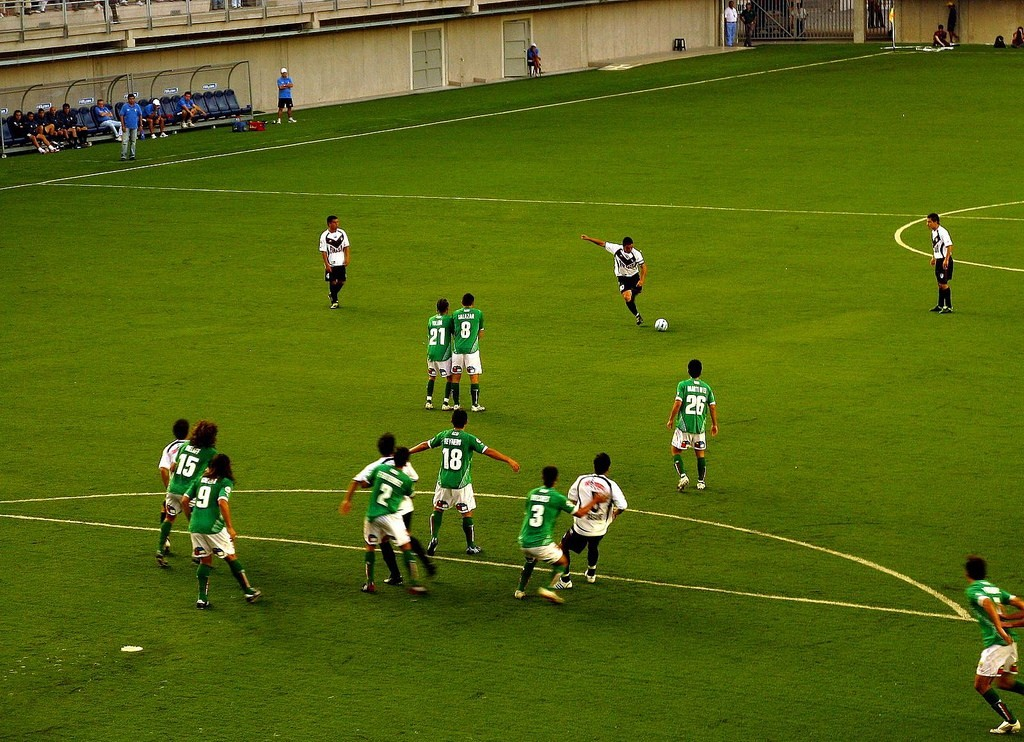
Santiago Morning against Audax Italiano in 2009.

In his re-inaugural season in 2000, the club made good performance, qualifying to the Copa Libertadores playoffs and being runner-up of the Copa Chile after of loss with Universidad de Chile in the final, also highlighted the participation of Fernando Martel, the goalscorer of the cup. In this season, the club had players as the self Martel, Francisco Arrué, Carlos Tejas and Manuel Ibarra.

In the next season, Morning nearly relegates to Primera B, but in 2002, the team were not saved from relegation, returning to the second level. In 2005, under the coach Ivo Basay and with players as Esteban Paredes and Rodrigo Goldberg, 'The Bohemians' achieved the promotion to the Chilean Primera División. In the next season, the team once relegated to the second tier. Once winning the Second Division, he returned to the First Division, where they remain until today.

In the season 2008, the bohemian team realized an unexpected season, despite defeat 8–2 to Universidad Católica in the first week of the Torneo de Apertura, the club had a very good style of play, including, this that led them to nearly qualify for the playoffs. The club made a similar season in the Torneo de Clausura, nearly qualifying for the play-offs, finishing in the third place with 26 points of his group under O'Higgins with 27 points in the second place.

In the next season, Morning qualified for first time in its history to play-offs, but the team immediately was eliminated by Católica by a global result of 8–1. For the Torneo de Clausura, the team made big signs as Reinaldo Navia, Rodolfo Ferrando and Sergio Comba. In this tournament, Morning also qualified to the play-offs, winning the first match to Audax Italiano for an aggregate result of 5–4, thanks to a 90th-minute goal of the goalkeeper Víctor Loyola, but shortly after once the team was eliminated by Católica, now in the semi-finals for an aggregate result of 8–3.

In the 2010 season, the club completed an irregular season finishing in the 16th place, being only two points of the direct relegation, in where was the team Everton. In the Promotion play-offs, the club nearly relegated to the Second Division, after of win to Antofagasta with a last minute goal of Pablo Calandria at extra-time.

== Rivalries ==
Santiago Morning's traditional rival is Magallanes, disputing the 'Metropolitan Derby'. The major shareholder of the club is former footballer Miguel Nasur, since Demetrio Marinakis left the club in 2005.

Santiago Morning is part of CONMEBOL's '"Club de los 100"' (Centerary's Club) alongside other Chilean clubs like Audax Italiano, Everton, Unión Española, Fernández Vial, Magallanes and Santiago Wanderers.

== Honours ==
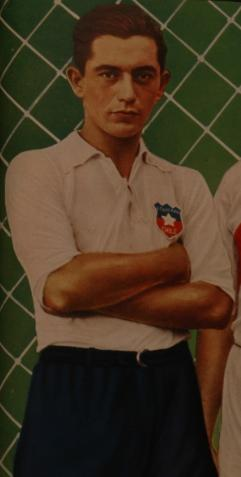
Raúl Toro, most successful player of Santiago Morning during the 1940s.

=== National ===
- Primera División de Chile
  - Winners (1): 1942
- Campeonato de Apertura
  - Winners (3): 1944, 1949, 1950
- Campeonato de Campeones
  - Winners (2): 1943, 1944
- Primera B
  - Winners (3): 1959, 1974, 2005
- Tercera División de Chile
  - Winners (2): 1984, 1996

== Players ==
=== Current squad ===
Current squad of Santiago Morning as of 26 April 2026 (edit)
Sources: ANFP Official Web Site

No.		Position	Player
1	ARG	GK	Juan Cruz Bolado
2	CHI	DF	Nicolás Palomo
3	COL	DF	David Montoya
4	CHI	MF	Martín Almuna
5	CHI	DF	Martín Delgado
6	CHI	DF	Cristóbal Kuljis
7	CHI	FW	Martin Arancibia
8	CHI	MF	Sebastián Salazar
10	CHI	MF	Luis Valenzuela
11	COL	FW	Gustavo Escobar
12	CHI	GK	Benjamín Rebolledo
13	CHI	GK	Milovan Arredondo
14	CHI	MF	Diego Faúndez
16	CHI	DF	Marcelo Jorquera
17	CHI	DF	Cristian Magaña

No.		Position	Player
19	CHI	MF	Joaquín Monje
20	CHI	MF	Simón Arias
21	CHI	MF	Fernando Manríquez (c)
22	CHI	MF	Emerson Rubio
23	CHI	FW	Kevin Rojas
24	CHI	DF	Luciano Meza
25	CHI	DF	Álvaro Rojas
26	CHI	FW	Carlos Muñoz
27	CHI	MF	Matías Coronado
28	CHI	DF	Vicente Cabrera
29	CHI	MF	Cristián Quezada
30	CHI	FW	Joaquín Barrientos
32	CHI	DF	Edgardo Carreño
33	CHI	MF	Patrick Lobos
34	CHI	MF	Benjamín Jaque

Manager: Esteban Paredes

=== 2021 Winter Transfers ===
==== In ====
Note: Flags indicate national team as defined under FIFA eligibility rules; some limited exceptions apply. Players may hold more than one non-FIFA nationality.

No. / Pos. / Nation / Player; 26 / GK / ARG / Sebastián López (from Lautaro de Buin)	No. / Pos. / Nation / Player; 31 / MF / CHI / Pablo Vergara (from Cobreloa)

==== Out ====
Note: Flags indicate national team as defined under FIFA eligibility rules; some limited exceptions apply. Players may hold more than one non-FIFA nationality.

No. / Pos. / Nation / Player	No. / Pos. / Nation / Player

== Notable players ==
- (Argentina) Salvador Nocetti
- (Chile) Humberto Cruz
- (Chile) Adán Godoy
- (Chile) Fernando Manríquez
- (Chile) Fernando Martel
- (Chile) Esteban Paredes
- (Chile) Domingo Romo
- (Spain) Luis Larraza

== Individual honours ==
=== Primera División goalscorers ===
- Domingo Romo: 16, 1942
- Rubén Aguilera: 21, 1951
- (Chile) Victor Pizarro: 27, 1975
- (Chile) Esteban Paredes: 17, Apertura 2009
- (Argentina) Diego Rivarola: 13, Clausura 2009

=== Copa Chile goalscorers ===
- (Chile) Fernando Martel: 8, 2000

== Coaches ==
- (Chile) Marco Antonio Vera (1941)
- (Argentina) José Luis Boffi (1942–1943)
- (Argentina) (Chile) Salvador Nocetti (1946)
- (Hungary) Francisco Platko (1947–1948)
- (Argentina) José Luis Boffi (1950–1951)
- (Chile) Luis Tirado (1954)
- (Argentina) José Luis Boffi (1955)
- (Chile) Alberto Buccicardi (1959)
- (Chile) Julio Varela (1959)
- (Chile) Isaac Fernández (1961–1962)
- (Chile) Fernando Wurth (1963)
- (Chile) Francisco Hormazábal (1963)
- (Argentina) Donato Hernández (1964)
- (Chile) Francisco Hormazábal (1965)
- (Argentina) José Luis Boffi (1966)
- (Argentina) (Chile) Salvador Nocetti (1967–1968)
- (Chile) Isaac Carrasco (1968–1969)
- (Chile) Rosamel Miranda (1970)
- (Argentina) Luis Ángel López (1972–1973)
- (Chile) Enrique Hormazábal (1974–1975)
- (Uruguay) Pedro Cubilla (1976)
- (Chile) Aurelio Valenzuela (1976)
- (Chile) José González (1976)
- (Chile) Luis Álamos (1976–1977)
- (Chile) José Santos Arias (1978–1979)
- (Chile) Enrique Hormazábal (1979)
- (Argentina) (Chile) Salvador Nocetti (1979)
- (Chile) Isaac Carrasco (1980)
- (Chile) Humberto Cruz (1981–1982)
- (Chile) Enrique Hormazábal (1983)
- (Chile) Carlos Contreras (1984)
- (Chile) Guillermo Páez (1984)
- (Chile) Juan Carlos Esquivel (1985)
- (Chile) Daniel Díaz (1990)
- (Chile) Héctor Jara (1994)
- (Chile) Ismael Ahumada (1994)
- (Chile) Carlos Ramos (1995–1997)
- (Chile) Sergio Lillo (1997)
- (Chile) Hernán Castro (1997)
- (Chile) Sasha Mitjaew (1997)
- (Chile) Jorge Aravena (1998–1999)
- (Paraguay) Sergio Nichiporuk (2000)
- (Uruguay) Ricardo Ortiz (2001)
- (Chile) Jorge Aravena (2001–2002)
- (Chile) Hernán Godoy (2002–2003)
- (Chile) Justo Farrán (2004)
- (Chile) Ivo Basay (2005–2006)
- (Chile) Orlando Aravena (2006)
- (Chile) Guillermo Páez (2006)
- (Chile) Orlando Mondaca (2007)
- (Argentina) José Basualdo (2008–2009)
- (Chile) Mauricio Pozo (2009)
- (Argentina) (Spain) Juan Antonio Pizzi (2009–2010)
- (Chile) Justo Farrán (2010)
- (Chile) Fernando Díaz (2010–2011)
- (Chile) Hernán Godoy (2011)
- (Argentina) Ricardo Lunari (2012)
- (Chile) Hugo Monardes (2012)
- (Chile) Hernán Ibarra (2012)
- (Chile) Hugo Monardes (2012)
- (Argentina) Mauricio Giganti (2013)
- (Chile) Hernán Ibarra (2013)
- (Chile) Hernán Godoy (2013–2014)
- (Chile) Patricio Almendra (2014–2015)
- (Chile) Mauricio Pozo (2015)
- (Chile) Justo Farrán (2015)
- (Chile) Miguel Ángel Arrué (2015–2016)
- (Chile) Justo Farrán (2016)
- (Chile) Hernán Godoy (2016–2017)
- (Chile) Jaime García (2018)
- (Chile) René Curaz (2018–2019)
- (Chile) Agustín Almarza (2019)
- (Chile) Luis Landeros (2019–2020)
- (Chile) Agustín Almarza (2020)
- (Chile) Fabián Marzuca (2020–2022)
- (Chile) Cristián Muñoz (2022–2023)
- (Chile) Claudio Rojas (2023)
- (Chile) Luis Marcoleta (2023–2025)
- (Chile) Cristian Febre (2025)
- (Chile) Esteban Paredes (2026–Present)
