= Unión Española =

Chilean football club

- Full name: Unión Española S.A.D.P.
- Nicknames: La Furia (The Fury); El Rojo (The Red); Hispanos (Hispanics)
- Founded: 18 May 1897; 129 years ago as Centro Español de Instrucción y Recreación
- Ground: Estadio Santa Laura
- Capacity: 19,000
- Owner: Jorge Segovia
- Chairman: Arturo Juarros
- Manager: Miguel Ponce
- League: Primera B
- 2025: Liga de Primera, 16th of 16 (relegated)
- Website: www.unionespanola.cl
| Home colours | Away colours |

Unión Española is a professional sports club based in Independencia, Santiago, Chile. Best known for its football team, the club competes in the Primera B de Chile. It also operates a women's team and an extensive youth academy whose teams compete in national competitions. Unión Española is one of the oldest football clubs in Chile.

The club was founded on 18 May 1897 as the Centro Español de Instrucción y Recreación by Spanish immigrants and their descendants, with the aim of providing a meeting place for members of the community who were excluded from the social clubs of the time. Following a merger with Unión Deportiva Española, the club was re-established on 12 April 1934 under its present name, Unión Española.

Unión Española is the fifth-most successful club in the history of the Chilean Primera División, having won seven league titles. The club has also won two Copa Chile titles, one Supercopa de Chile and one Primera B de Chile championship. With 90 seasons in the top flight, it ranks second for all-time appearances in Chile's highest division, behind only Colo-Colo. Internationally, Unión Española has competed in 13 editions of the Copa Libertadores and is one of only four Chilean clubs to have reached the final, finishing as runners-up in 1975 after losing to Independiente.

The club owns Estadio Santa Laura, traditionally known as the "cathedral of Chilean football". Located in northern Santiago, the stadium has a capacity of approximately 20,000 following its renovation. Unión Española is one of five Chilean clubs to own its home ground.

Unión Española's traditional rival is Audax Italiano, with whom it contests the Clásico de Colonias, a rivalry historically associated with Chile's Spanish and Italian immigrant communities. Matches against Palestino have also been described as a Clásico de Colonias by the Chilean sports media.

The club also has a longstanding rivalry with Universidad Católica, dating back to the former Clásico de Independencia, and the fixture continues to be regarded as a clásico by many supporters and sections of the media.

The club's traditional colours are red and yellow, reflecting the colours of the flag of Spain.

== History ==
=== Origins and consolidation ===
Unión Española traces its origins to the Spanish community in Santiago. In 1885, a group of 23 Spanish residents led by Ignacio Balcells proposed establishing a recreational centre for Spanish immigrants, intended as a meeting place where members of the community could socialise and preserve their customs through sport and other activities. The initiative culminated in the establishment of the Centro Español de Instrucción y Recreación on 18 May 1897, with Balcells serving as its first president.

As interest in organised sport grew within the institution, its activities expanded beyond recreation. The Club Ciclista Ibérico was founded in 1909, followed by the football section, Club Ibérico Balompié, in 1918. The latter joined the Asociación de Football de Santiago and won both the Copa Chile and Copa Unión in 1920. In 1922, the cycling and football organisations merged to form Unión Deportiva Española, bringing the community's principal sporting activities under a single institution.

During the amateur era, Unión Deportiva Española emerged as one of the leading sides in Santiago football. It won consecutive Copa Chile titles in 1924 and 1925, with Spanish defender Juan Legarreta serving as captain during this period. In December 1925, Unión faced Colo-Colo for the Santiago championship, losing 2–0 before approximately 10,000 spectators. Following the reorganisation of Chilean football, the club joined the Liga Central de Football de Santiago, winning its Serie A championship in 1928 and finishing runners-up in 1930.

=== Rise: 1930–1951 ===
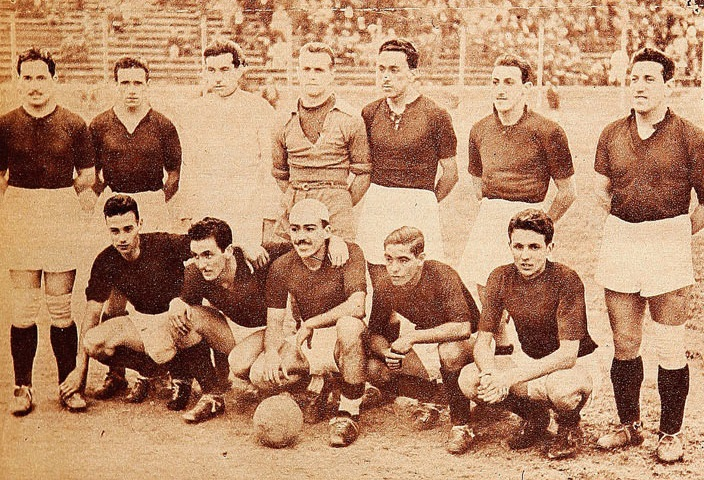
Unión Española in 1937.

In 1933, Unión Deportiva Española joined Colo-Colo, Audax Italiano, Magallanes and other leading Santiago clubs in establishing the country's first professional football league, the precursor of the modern Chilean Primera División. The club reached the final of the inaugural Campeonato de Apertura and finished fourth in the first professional league season. On 12 April 1934, the institution formally adopted the name Unión Española.

The club initially struggled to establish itself in the professional game. Its performances improved towards the end of the decade, but the Spanish Civil War had a significant impact on an institution closely associated with Chile's Spanish community. In 1939, the team briefly competed under the name Central before withdrawing from competition. It returned the following season with a squad that had been largely dismantled during the hiatus, prompting a substantial rebuilding process.

Spanish manager Manuel Casals was appointed in 1940 and developed a new team largely around players from the club's youth system. Although results were initially poor, the policy gradually restored Unión's competitiveness. Under Atanasio Pardo, the club won its first Primera División championship in 1943, finishing two points ahead of Colo-Colo, and subsequently finished runners-up in 1945 and 1948. Unión also won the 1947 Campeonato de Apertura.

After narrowly missing out on the 1950 championship in a play-off against Everton de Viña del Mar, Unión won its second league title in 1951 under Spanish manager Isidro Lángara. Having finished level on points with traditional rival Audax Italiano, the two clubs met in a championship play-off at the Estadio Nacional, where Unión secured a 1–0 victory before 42,000 spectators. The title consolidated the club's position among the leading teams of Chile's early professional era.

=== Golden age ===
The club's most successful period began in the late 1960s and reached its height during the 1970s. The emergence of players such as Honorino Landa and a more ambitious sporting policy helped restore Unión to the forefront of Chilean football. After finishing league runners-up in 1970 and 1972, the appointment of Luis Santibáñez marked the beginning of a dominant cycle.

Unión won the Chilean championship in 1973, 1975 and 1977. Its greatest international achievement came in the 1975 Copa Libertadores, when the club reached the final against Independiente. Unión won the opening match 1–0 in Santiago but lost the return leg in Argentina and the deciding match in Asunción, finishing runners-up. This period established the club as one of the leading sides in Chilean football.

The following decade was considerably less successful, with the club twice coming close to relegation. A revival began in the early 1990s under Nelson Acosta, who led Unión to consecutive Copa Chile titles in 1992 and 1993. The club subsequently reached the quarter-finals of the 1994 Copa Libertadores, eliminating Cruzeiro before narrowly losing to defending champions São Paulo FC. That same year, Unión also recorded a notable friendly victory over Real Madrid at Estadio Santa Laura.

=== Modern era ===
Unión Española suffered the first relegation in its history in 1997, during its centenary year. After two seasons in the second tier, the club returned to the Primera División by winning the 1999 Primera B under Juvenal Olmos. Its return to the top flight was followed by a new period of sporting stability, culminating in the 2005 Apertura championship, its sixth league title and first in 28 years.

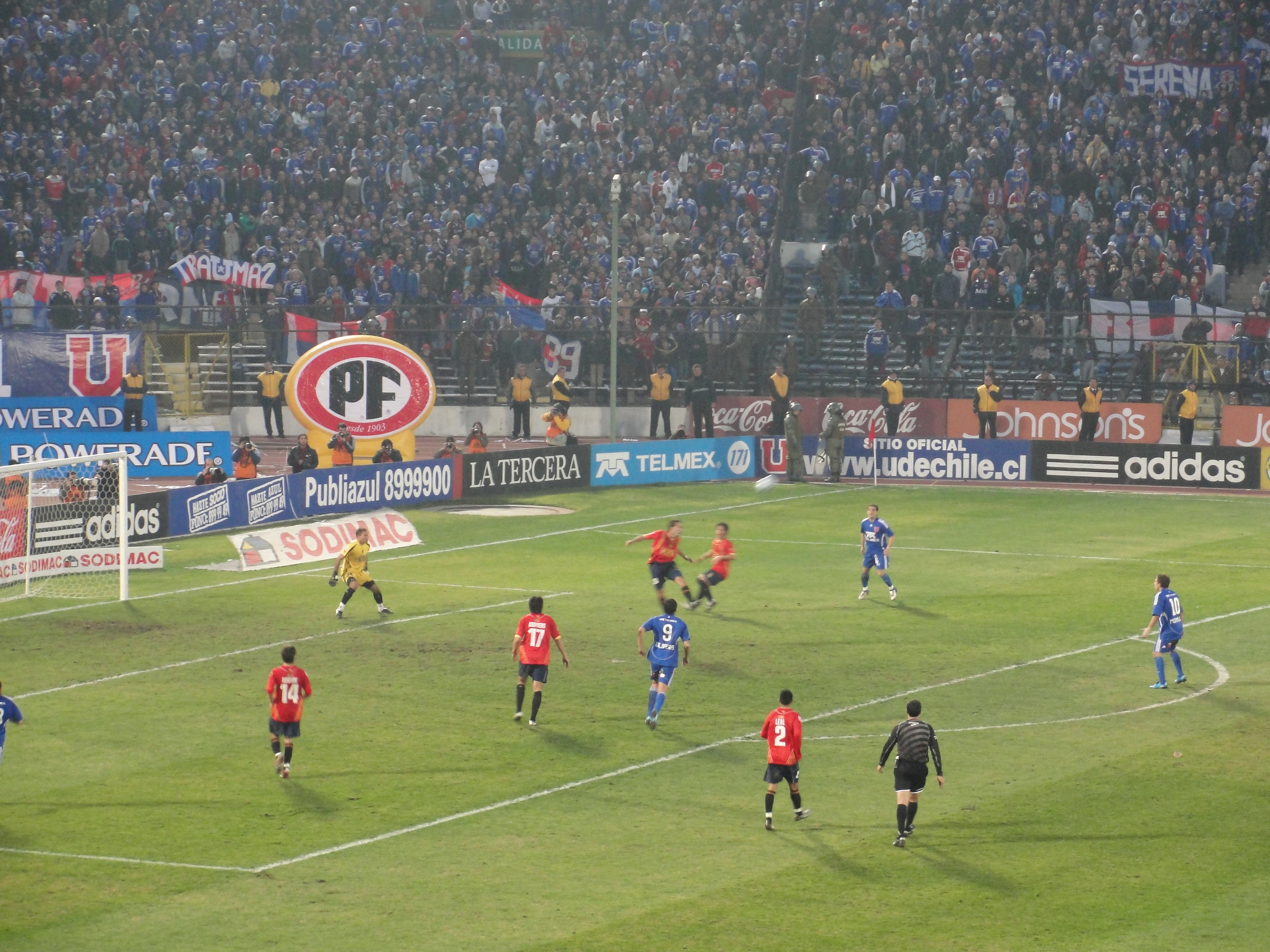
An Unión Española defender during the first leg of the 2009 Apertura final against Universidad de Chile.

The late 2000s also brought significant institutional change. Financial difficulties led to bankruptcy proceedings, after which the club came under the administration of SEK International University and Jorge Segovia. In 2008, Unión narrowly avoided relegation after recovering from a three-goal deficit against Deportes Puerto Montt in a promotion play-off at Santa Laura, a match later remembered as the "Miracle of Santa Laura".

From 2009, Unión once again became a regular contender in domestic and international competitions. The club reached the 2009 Apertura final, returned to the Copa Libertadores, and under former player José Luis Sierra advanced to the round of 16 of the 2012 Copa Libertadores, its first appearance at that stage in 18 years. Later that year, Unión lost the Clausura final to Huachipato on penalties.

The club responded by winning its seventh league championship in the 2013 Torneo Transición, edging Universidad Católica on goal difference, before adding the inaugural Supercopa de Chile. In the following years, Unión remained a regular presence in domestic competition and made further appearances in the Copa Libertadores and Copa Sudamericana. The club's fortunes later declined, culminating in its second relegation in 2025; in 2026, Unión Española returned to Primera B for the first time since 1999.

== Stadium ==
Home games have been played at the Estadio Santa Laura since their 1922 opening.

After Segovia's arrival in May 2008, the stadium was remodeled at a cost of 4 billion pesos. In 2009, the stadium was renamed as Estadio Santa Laura–Universidad SEK.

== Rivals ==
The club's traditional rivals are Palestino, a team founded by members of the Palestinian diaspora living in Chile and Audax Italiano, which originated from their local Italian counterpart.

With Palestino and Audax, the team plays the so-called Clásico de Colonias ("Diaspora Derby").

== Club facts ==
- 85 Seasons in Primera División: (1933–1938, 1940–1997, 2000–2025)
- 2 Seasons in Primera B: (1998–1999, 2026–)
- 13 Participations in Copa Libertadores (1971, 1973, 1974, 1975, 1976, 1978, 1994, 2006, 2011, 2012, 2014, 2017, 2021)
- 5 Participations in Copa Sudamericana (2009, 2018, 2019, 2022, 2025)
- 1 Participation in Copa Ganadores de Copa (1970)
- Record Primera División victory — 14–1 v. Morning Star (1934)
- Record Primera División defeat — 0–6 v. Santiago Morning (1954)
- Record Copa Chile victory — 7–0 v. Municipal La Pintana (2011)
- Most goals scored (Primera División matches) — 132, Honorino Landa (1960–1965, 1969, 1973)
- Highest home attendance — 76,118 v. Colo-Colo (7 January 1990) (at Estadio Nacional)
- Primera División Best Position — Champions (1943, 1951, 1973, 1975, 1977, 2005-A, 2013-T)
- Copa Chile Best Season — Champions (1992, 1993)

== Players ==
=== Current squad ===
Current squad of Unión Española as of 5 August 2026 (edit)
Sources: ANFP Official Web Site

| No. | | Position | Player |
|---|---|---|---|
| 2 | CHI | DF | Kevin Contreras |
| 3 | CHI | DF | Rodrigo Alarcón |
| 4 | CHI | DF | Milovan Celis |
| 5 | URU | MF | William Machado |
| 6 | CHI | MF | Bruno Jáuregui |
| 7 | CHI | FW | Rodrigo Vásquez |
| 8 | CHI | FW | Patricio Rubio |
| 9 | CHI | FW | Andrés Vilches |
| 10 | CHI | MF | Pablo Aránguiz (c) |
| 11 | ARG | FW | Franco Ratotti (loan from Unión Santa Fe) |
| 12 | CHI | GK | Enzo Uribe |
| 13 | CHI | GK | Julio Fierro (loan from Colo-Colo) |
| 14 | CHI | MF | Ignacio Núñez |
| 15 | CHI | MF | Benjamín Droguett |
| 16 | CHI | DF | Martín Ormeño |
| 17 | PLE | MF | Felipe Massri |
| 18 | URU | DF | José Aja |

| No. | | Position | Player |
|---|---|---|---|
| 19 | CHI | MF | Ángelo Araos |
| 20 | CHI | FW | Mitchell Wassenne |
| 21 | CHI | DF | Sebastián Pereira |
| 22 | CHI | MF | Agustín Núñez |
| 23 | ARG | MF | Ulises Ojeda (loan from Deportes Concepción) |
| 24 | CHI | DF | Gabriel Norambuena |
| 25 | CHI | FW | Tomás Ovando |
| 26 | CHI | DF | Bastián Roco |
| 27 | COL | FW | Diego Vallecilla |
| 28 | CHI | MF | Nicolás Valencia |
| 29 | CHI | FW | Bayron Veas |
| 30 | CHI | MF | Renato Cordero (loan from Universidad de Chile) |
| 31 | CHI | GK | Martín Parra |
| 32 | CHI | DF | Lucas Molina (loan from Universidad de Concepción) |
| 33 | CHI | MF | Cristóbal Jaramillo |
| 34 | CHI | GK | Fernando Soto |
| 37 | CHI | FW | Matías Ortiz |

Manager: Ronald Fuentes

- The teams of the Chilean Primera Division are limited to seven players without Chilean nationality and also are limited to five foreign players in the field. The squads with more of seven players in the squad or five foreign players are sanctioned by the ANFP. The squad of the club now have all places of foreign players, two Argentine players, one Palestinian, and one Uruguayan player.

=== 2025 Summer Transfers ===
==== In ====
Note: Flags indicate national team as defined under FIFA eligibility rules; some limited exceptions apply. Players may hold more than one non-FIFA nationality.

| No. | Pos. | Nation | Player |
|---|---|---|---|
| -- | DF | CHI | Sebastián Pereira (from Everton) |
| -- | DF | CHI | Brayan Véjar (from Palestino) |

| No. | Pos. | Nation | Player |
|---|---|---|---|
| -- | DF | CHI | Felipe Espinoza (from Deportes Magallanes) |
| -- | MF | URU | Agustín Nadruz (from Deportes Iquique) |

==== Out ====
Note: Flags indicate national team as defined under FIFA eligibility rules; some limited exceptions apply. Players may hold more than one non-FIFA nationality.

| No. | Pos. | Nation | Player |
|---|---|---|---|
| 1 | GK | CHI | Alonso Montecinos (Relesead) |
| 5 | MF | ARG | Diego González (Relesead) |
| 6 | DF | CHI | Luis Pavez (to O'Higgins) |
| 9 | FW | CHI | Leandro Benegas (Relesead) |
| 10 | MF | ARG | Emiliano Vecchio (Relesead) |
| 13 | GK | CHI | Martín Ballesteros (back to Colo-Colo) |

| No. | Pos. | Nation | Player |
|---|---|---|---|
| 22 | FW | CHI | Bastián Yáñez (Relesead) |
| 29 | DF | CHI | Stefano Magnasco (Relesead) |
| 30 | DF | CHI | José Tiznado (back to Cobresal) |
| 33 | MF | CHI | Sebastián Leyton (Relesead) |
| 34 | FW | PAR | Fernando Ovelar (back to Pachuca) |
| 37 | DF | CHI | Jeyson Rojas (back to Colo-Colo) |

== Managers ==
=== Current staff ===
| Position | Name |
|---|---|
| Coach | (Chile) Jorge Pellicer |
| Assistant coach | (Chile) Francisco Quiroz |
| Fitness coach | (Chile) Felipe Prieto |
| Goalkeepers' coach | (Chile) Matías Fernández |
| Physician | (Chile) Cristián Carmona |
| Physiotherapists | (Chile) Felipe Suárez (Chile) Pablo Celis |

=== Historical Managers ===
- (Spain) Alfredo Plá (1918–1919)
- (Chile) (Spain) Juan Legarreta (1920–1929)
- (Chile) Gerardo Mediavilla (1930)
- (Chile) Raimundo Caballero (1931–1932)
- (Chile) Gerardo Mediavilla & Juan Bautista Lapiedra (1933)
- (Chile) Enrique Teuche (1934–1935)
- (Chile) Luis Tirado (1936–1938)
- (Chile) Atanasio Pardo (1938–1939)
- (Spain) Manuel Casals (1940–1943)
- (Chile) Atanasio Pardo (1943–1944)
- (Chile) Carlos Schneeberger (1945)
- (Spain) Isidro Lángara (1950–1951)
- (Chile) Hernán Fernández (1954)
- (Argentina) Martín García (1955–1958)
- (Chile) Francisco Hormazábal (1959–1960)
- (Argentina) Francisco Villegas (1961)
- (Chile) Voltaire Carvajal (1961)
- (Chile) Luis Tirado (1962)
- (Chile) Domingo González (1962–1963)
- (Argentina) Isaac Fernández (1964)
- (Chile) Dante Pesce (1965)
- (Chile) Domingo González (1965–1966)
- (Chile) (Spain) Francisco Molina (1966–1967)
- (Chile) Andrés Prieto (1968)
- (Chile) Sergio Navarro (1969)
- (Spain) Pedro Areso (1969)
- (Argentina) Miguel Mocciola & (Spain) Pedro Areso (1969–1970)
- (Argentina) Federico Vairo (1970)
- (Spain) Pedro Areso (1970)
- (Argentina) (Chile) Néstor Isella (1971–1972)
- (Chile) Luis Santibáñez (1973–1974)
- (Chile) Jaime Ramírez (1974)
- (Chile) Manuel Rodríguez (1974)
- (Chile) Luis Santibáñez (1974–1977)
- (Chile) Pedro García (1978)
- (Chile) Luis Álamos (1978)
- (Chile) Germán Cornejo (1978–1979)
- (Argentina) José María Silvero (1979)
- (Chile) Orlando Aravena (1980)
- (Italy) (Argentina) Nicolás Novello (1981)
- (Chile) Honorino Landa (1982–1983)
- (Chile) Humberto Cruz (1983)
- (Chile) Caupolicán Peña (1983)
- (Chile) Orlando Aravena (1984–1985)
- (Chile) Mario Moreno (1986)
- (Chile) Héctor Pinto (1986–1988)
- (Chile) Juan Machuca (1988)
- (Chile) Luis Santibáñez (1988)
- (Chile) Manuel Rodríguez (1989–1991)
- (Chile) Juan Rodríguez Vega (1991)
- (Chile) Pedro García (1991)
- (Uruguay) (Chile) Nelson Acosta (1992)
- (Chile) Ricardo Contreras (1992)
- (Chile) Guillermo Yávar (1992)
- (Chile) Miguel Ángel Neira (1992)
- (Uruguay) (Chile) Nelson Acosta (1992–1996)
- (Uruguay) (Colombia) Julio Comesaña (1996)
- (Argentina) (Chile) Jorge Spedaletti (1996)
- (Chile) Guillermo Páez (1996–1997)
- (Chile) Luis Ahumada (1997)
- (Paraguay) Rogelio Delgado (1997)
- (Chile) Guillermo Yávar (1998)
- (Chile) Juvenal Olmos (1999–2000)
- (Chile) Leonardo Véliz (2001–2002)
- (Chile) Roberto Hernández (2002–2003)
- (Chile) Fernando Carvallo (2003–2004)
- (Chile) Fernando Díaz (2005)
- (Chile) Fernando Carvallo (2006)
- (Chile) Manuel Rodríguez (2006)
- (Chile) Héctor Pinto (2007)
- (Argentina) Marcelo Espina (2007–2008)
- (Chile) Jorge Garcés (2008)
- (Chile) Luis Hernán Carvallo (2008–2009)
- (Chile) José Luis Sierra (2009)
- (Uruguay) Rubén Israel (2009–2010)
- (Chile) José Luis Sierra (2010–2015)
- (Chile) Fernando Vergara (2015–2016)
- (Chile) Vladimir Bigorra (2016)
- (Argentina) Martín Palermo (2016–2018)
- (Chile) Sebastián Zúñiga (2018)
- (Chile) Fernando Díaz (2018–2019)
- (Chile) Ronald Fuentes (2019–2020)
- (Chile) César Bravo (2021)
- (Chile) Jorge Pellicer (2021)
- (Chile) César Bravo (2021–2022)
- (Chile) (Argentina) Gustavo Canales (2022)
- (Chile) Ronald Fuentes (2023)
- (Chile) Miguel Ponce (2024)
- (Chile) José Luis Sierra (2024–2025)
- (Chile) Gonzalo Villagra (2025)
- (Chile) Miguel Ramírez (2025)
- (Chile) Gonzalo Villagra (2025–2026)
- (Chile) Ronald Fuentes (2026–Present)

== Honours ==
Unión Española has won Primera División seven times, behind Colo-Colo (31), Universidad de Chile (18), Universidad Católica (14) and Cobreloa (8), as well as winning two Copa Chile titles.

On the South American stage Unión has participated nine times in Copa Libertadores, one time in Copa Sudamericana and one time in the Copa Ganadores de Copa. Unión also was runner-up in the Copa Libertadores of 1975.

=== National ===
- Primera División de Chile
  - Winners (7): 1943, 1951, 1973, 1975, 1977, 2005–A, 2013–T
- Copa Chile
  - Winners (2): 1992, 1993
- Copa Invierno
  - Winners (1): 1989
- Campeonato de Apertura
  - Winners (1): 1947
- Supercopa de Chile
  - Winners (1): 2013
- Primera B de Chile
  - Winners (1): 1999

=== International ===
- Copa Libertadores
  - Runners-up (1): 1975

=== Regional ===
- Copa Chile de la Asociación de Football de Santiago
  - Winners (3): 1920, 1924, 1925
- Copa Unión de la Asociación de Football de Santiago
  - Winners (1): 1920
- Campeonato de Apertura de la Asociación de Football de Santiago
  - Winners (1): 1925
- Primera División de la Liga Central de Football de Santiago
  - Winners (1): Serie A 1928
- Torneo Metropolitano de Chile
  - Winners (1): 1970
- Copa Arauco de la Segunda División de la Asociación de Football de Santiago
  - Winners (3): 1919, 1922, 1923

== Legacy ==
Unión Española is the second oldest club of the Primera División Chilena behind Santiago Wanderers that was founded in 1892.

== Women's football ==
It has a branch of women's football, and competes in national tournaments with its lower categories.
