= C.D. Aviación =

Association football club in Chile

Deportes Aviación
- Full name: Club de Deportes Aviación
- Founded: December 12, 1957
- Dissolved: 1981
- Ground: Estadio Reinaldo Martín Muller
- League: Segunda División
- 1981: 3rd
Home colours	Away colours

Club de Deportes Aviación was a Chilean association football club based in the commune of El Bosque, Santiago. The club was founded in 1957 by the Chilean Air Force and played in professional leagues between 1972 and 1981, when it was dissolved.

In 1973, it won the second-tier competition of Chilean football.

== National honours ==
- Regional Zona Central: 1

1971

- Segunda Division: 1

1973

== Records ==
- Record Primera División victory — 6–2 v. Coquimbo Unido (1979)
- Record Primera División defeat — 0–6 v. Huachipato (1975), Universidad de Chile (1976)
- Most goals scored (Primera División matches) — 61, Ricardo Fabbiani
- Primera División Best Position — 8th (1977), (1978)
