= 1975 Copa Libertadores group stage =

Football tournament group stage

The 1975 Copa Libertadores group stage or 1975 Copa Libertadores first stage was played from 16 February to 11 April 1975. A total of 20 teams competed in the group stage to decide 5 places in the semi-finals of the 1975 Copa Libertadores, where they joined Independiente, who qualified directly to the semi-finals as defending champions.

== Groups composition ==
The 20 participating teams were divided into 5 groups of 4, which consisted of two teams from one national association and two teams from another.

- Group 1: Argentina and Paraguay
- Group 2: Chile and Bolivia
- Group 3: Brazil and Colombia
- Group 4: Ecuador and Venezuela
- Group 5: Peru and Bolivia

== Format ==
In the group stage, each group was played on a home-and-away round-robin basis. The teams were ranked according to the following criteria: 1. Points (2 points for a win, 1 point for a draw, and 0 points for a loss); 2. Goal difference

If two teams from the same national association tie on points, the above criteria would not apply and their final positions would be determined in an extra match to be played at a venue within their own country that was decided by drawing of lots. Winners of this match qualified for the seminfinals; in the event of a draw, the team with the best goal difference in the group would have qualified.

The winners of each group advanced to the semi-finals.

== Groups ==
=== Group 1 ===
Pos	Team	Pld	W	D	L	GF	GA	GD	Pts	Qualification	ROS	NOB	OLI	CER
1	(Argentina) Rosario Central	6	2	4	0	8	5	+3	8	Qualified to the Semi-finals	—	1–1	1–1	2–1
2	(Argentina) Newell's Old Boys	6	3	2	1	9	8	+1	8		1–1	—	3–2	3–2
3	(Paraguay) Olimpia	6	2	3	1	7	5	+2	7		0–0	2–0	—	2–1
4	(Paraguay) Cerro Porteño	6	0	1	5	5	11	−6	1		1–3	0–1	0–0	—

Source: Copa Libertadores 1975
Legend: Blue = home team win; Yellow = draw; Red = away team win.
February 28, 1975

Rosario Central (Argentina)	1–1	(Argentina) Newell's Old Boys
Arias 26' (pen.)	Report	Ribeca 43'

Gigante de Arroyito, Rosario
Attendance: 50,000
Referee: Arturo Ithurralde (Argentina)

February 28, 1975

Cerro Porteño (Paraguay)	0–0	(Paraguay) Olimpia
	Report

Defensores del Chaco, Asunción
Attendance: 50,000
Referee: Juan Silvagno (Chile)

March 7, 1975

Olimpia (Paraguay)	2–0	(Argentina) Newell's Old Boys
Aquino 53'; Kiese 79'	Report

Defensores del Chaco, Asunción
Attendance: 45,000
Referee: René Torres (Ecuador)

March 7, 1975

Rosario Central (Argentina)	2–1	(Paraguay) Cerro Porteño
Cabral 70'; Pascuttini 74' (pen.)	Report	Berón 76'

Gigante de Arroyito, Rosario
Attendance: 30,000
Referee: José Martínez Bazán (Uruguay)

March 14, 1975

Cerro Porteño (Paraguay)	0–1	(Argentina) Newell's Old Boys
	Report	Giachello 53'

Defensores del Chaco, Asunción
Attendance: 25,000
Referee: Roque Cerudio (Uruguay)

March 14, 1975

Rosario Central (Argentina)	1–1	(Paraguay) Olimpia
Zavagno 60'	Report	Kiese 81'

Gigante de Arroyito, Rosario
Attendance: 35,000
Referee: Juan Carlos Robles (Chile)

March 21, 1975

Newell's Old Boys (Argentina)	1–1	(Argentina) Rosario Central
Giachello 11'	Report	Cabral 84'

El Coloso del Parque, Rosario
Attendance: 55,000
Referee: Luis Pestarino (Argentina)

March 21, 1975

Olimpia (Paraguay)	2–1	(Paraguay) Cerro Porteño
Paniagua 8'; Torres 25'	Report	Osorio 18'

Defensores del Chaco, Asunción
Attendance: 45,000
Referee: Agomar Martíns (Brazil)

April 4, 1975

Newell's Old Boys (Argentina)	3–2	(Paraguay) Olimpia
Valdano 38', 50'; Giachello 53'	Report	Insfrán 44'; Paniagua 75'

El Coloso del Parque, Rosario
Attendance: 40,000
Referee: Edison Pérez Núñez (Peru)

April 4, 1975

Cerro Porteño (Paraguay)	1–3	(Argentina) Rosario Central
Talavera 1'	Report	Kempes 2'; Solari 43'; Cabral 44'

Defensores del Chaco, Asunción
Attendance: 35,000
Referee: Alberto Martínez (Chile)

April 9, 1975

Newell's Old Boys (Argentina)	3–2	(Paraguay) Cerro Porteño
Giachello 19'; Gallego 57'; Valdano 65'	Report	Jiménez 26'; Berón 63'

El Coloso del Parque, Rosario
Attendance: 35,000
Referee: Favilli Neto (Brazil)

April 9, 1975

Olimpia (Paraguay)	0–0	(Argentina) Rosario Central
	Report

Defensores del Chaco, Asunción
Attendance: 50,000
Referee: Romualdo Arppi Filho (Brazil)

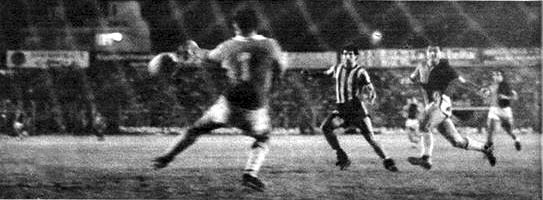
The goal of Mario Kempes for the Rosario Central win, securing the first place in the group

April 11, 1975
First place playoff

Rosario Central (Argentina)	1–0	(Argentina) Newell's Old Boys
Kempes 22'	Report

Gigante de Arroyito, Rosario
Attendance: 30,000
Referee: José Martínez Bazán (Uruguay)

=== Group 2 ===
Pos	Team	Pld	W	D	L	GF	GA	GD	Pts	Qualification	UES	HUA	STR	WIL
1	(Chile) Unión Española	6	3	3	0	17	5	+12	9	Qualified to the Semi-finals	—	7–2	4–0	4–1
2	(Chile) Huachipato	6	2	2	2	10	10	0	6		0–0	—	4–2	4–0
3	(Bolivia) The Strongest	6	2	2	2	8	11	−3	6		1–1	1–0	—	3–1
4	(Bolivia) Jorge Wilstermann	6	0	3	3	4	13	−9	3		1–1	0–0	1–1	—

Source: Copa Libertadores 1975
Legend: Blue = home team win; Yellow = draw; Red = away team win.
February 23, 1975

The Strongest (Bolivia)	3–1	(Bolivia) Jorge Wilstermann
Bastida 3', 30'; Farías 20'	Report	Ribeca 43'

Hernando Siles, La Paz
Attendance: 35,000
Referee: Juan Ortubé (Bolivia)

February 26, 1975

Huachipato (Chile)	0–0	(Chile) Unión Española
	Report

Municipal de Concepción, Concepción
Attendance: 20,000
Referee: Lorenzo Cantillana (Chile)

March 5, 1975

Jorge Wilstermann (Bolivia)	0–0	(Chile) Huachipato
	Report

Félix Capriles, Cochabamba
Attendance: 17,000
Referee: Héctor Ortíz (Paraguay)

March 9, 1975

The Strongest (Bolivia)	1–0	(Chile) Huachipato
Farías 43'	Report

Hernando Siles, La Paz
Attendance: 25,000
Referee: Juan Fortunato (Uruguay)

March 12, 1975

Jorge Wilstermann (Bolivia)	1–1	(Chile) Unión Española
Heraldo 27'	Report	Palacios 87'

Félix Capriles, Cochabamba
Attendance: 7,200
Referee: José Varrone (Venezuela)

March 16, 1975

The Strongest (Bolivia)	1–1	(Chile) Unión Española
Bastida 69'	Report	Spedaletti 32'

Hernando Siles, La Paz
Attendance: 25,000
Referee: Carlos Rivero (Perú)

March 26, 1975

Jorge Wilstermann (Bolivia)	1–1	(Bolivia) The Strongest
Villalón 89'	Report	Herrera 90'

Félix Capriles, Cochabamba
Attendance: 28,000
Referee: Luis Barrancos (Bolivia)

March 26, 1975

Unión Española (Chile)	7–2	(Chile) Huachipato
Palacios 1'; Véliz 29'; Las Heras 40'; Trujillo 41'; Machuca 60'; Gaete 73' (pen.); Ahumada 86'	Report	Sintas 70'; Díaz 87'

Estadio Nacional, Santiago
Attendance: 17,149
Referee: Sergio Vázquez (Chile)

April 1, 1975

Unión Española (Chile)	4–1	(Bolivia) Jorge Wilstermann
Trujillo 1', 36' (pen.); Véliz 15'; Palacios 50'	Report	Heraldo 57'

Estadio Nacional, Santiago
Attendance: 39,475
Referee: Oscar Veiro (Argentina)

April 4, 1975

Huachipato (Chile)	4–0	(Bolivia) Jorge Wilstermann
Salinas 31'; Neira 60'; Sintas 83'; Pinochet 87'	Report

Municipal de Concepción, Concepción
Attendance: 7,034
Referee: José Martínez Bazán (Uruguay)

April 8, 1975

Unión Española (Chile)	4–0	(Bolivia) The Strongest
Las Heras 8', 70'; Palacios 66'; Machuca 77'	Report

Estadio Nacional, Santiago
Attendance: 60,836
Referee: Roque Cerullo (Uruguay)

April 11, 1975

Huachipato (Chile)	4–2	(Bolivia) The Strongest
Iturra 2'; Neira 9', 24'; Sintas 16'	Report	Pariente 79'; Revollo 86'

Municipal de Concepción, Concepción
Attendance: 28,000
Referee: Luis Pestarino (Argentina)

=== Group 3 ===
Pos	Team	Pld	W	D	L	GF	GA	GD	Pts		(Brazil) CRU	(Colombia) CAL	(Colombia) ATL	(Brazil) VAS
1	(Brazil) Cruzeiro	6	3	1	2	10	9	+1	7	Qualified to the semi-finals	—			
2	(Colombia) Deportivo Cali	6	2	2	2	5	5	0	6			—		
3	(Colombia) Atlético Nacional	6	2	2	2	7	8	−1	6				—	
4	(Brazil) Vasco da Gama	6	1	3	2	7	7	0	5					—

Source: Copa Libertadores 1975
Legend: Blue = home team win; Yellow = draw; Red = away team win.

=== Group 4 ===
Pos	Team	Pld	W	D	L	GF	GA	GD	Pts		(Ecuador) LDQ	(Venezuela) POR	(Venezuela) DGA	(Ecuador) NAC
1	(Ecuador) LDU Quito	6	3	3	0	12	7	+5	9	Qualified to the semi-finals	—			
2	(Venezuela) Portuguesa	6	1	4	1	5	8	−3	6			—		
3	(Venezuela) Deportivo Galicia	6	1	3	2	7	6	+1	5				—	
4	(Ecuador) El Nacional	6	1	2	3	8	11	−3	4					—

Source: Copa Libertadores 1975
Legend: Blue = home team win; Yellow = draw; Red = away team win.

=== Group 5 ===
Pos	Team	Pld	W	D	L	GF	GA	GD	Pts	Qualification or relegation	(Peru) UNI	(Uruguay) PEÑ	(Uruguay) WAN	(Peru) HUA
1	(Peru) Universitario	6	4	2	0	12	6	+6	10	Qualified to the Semi-finals	—	3–2	3–1	2–2
2	(Uruguay) Peñarol	6	4	0	2	13	7	+6	8		0–1	—	1–0	5–2
3	(Uruguay) Montevideo Wanderers	6	1	1	4	8	10	−2	3		0–2	1–2	—	4–0
4	(Peru) Unión Huaral	6	0	3	3	7	17	−10	3		1–1	0–3	2–2	—

Legend: Blue = home team win; Yellow = draw; Red = away team win.
