= 1975 Copa Libertadores finals =

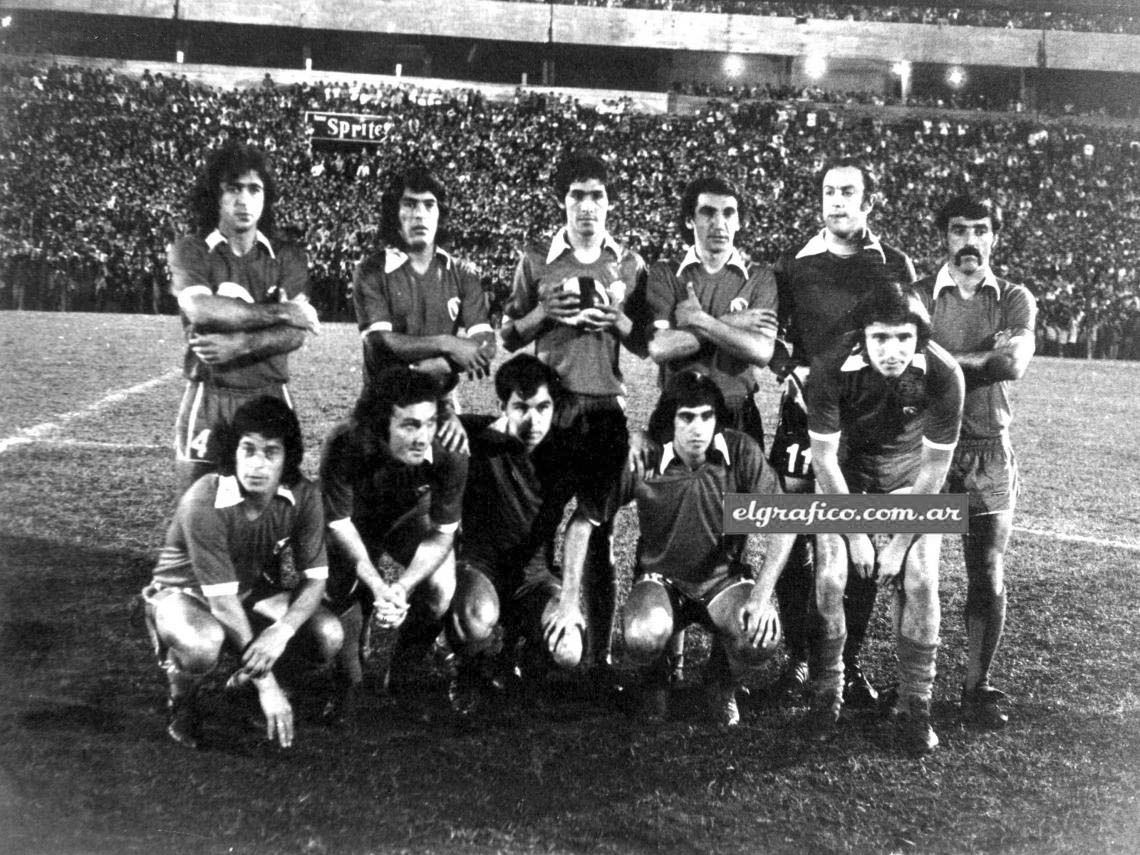
- The Independiente team that won this final.
- Event: 1975 Copa Libertadores de América
Unión Española	Independiente
(Chile)	(Argentina)
- 2–2 on points Independiente won after a play-off

First leg
Unión Española	Independiente
1	0
- Date: 18 June 1975
- Venue: Estadio Nacional, Santiago
- Referee: José Martínez Bazán (Uruguay)

Second leg
Independiente	Unión Española
3	1
- Date: 25 June 1975
- Venue: Estadio de Independiente, Avellaneda
- Referee: Rubén Barreto (Uruguay)

Play-off
Independiente	Unión Española
2	0
- Date: 29 June 1975
- Venue: Estadio Defensores del Chaco, Asunción
- Referee: Edison Pérez (Peru)
- Attendance: 55,000

The 1975 Copa Libertadores finals was the final two-legged tie to determine the 1975 Copa Libertadores champion. It was contested by Argentine club Independiente and Chilean club Unión Española. The first leg of the tie was played on 18 June in Santiago, with the second leg played on 25 June in Avellaneda. Under the rules of the time, if a team won the first match and the other won the second, or if the matches were two ties, a tie-breaking match would take place.

Independiente won the series after winning a tie-breaking playoff 2–0 at Asunción's Estadio Defensores del Chaco, achieving its fourth consecutive Copa Libertadores title.

This is so far the only time a team won the Copa Libertadores four times in a row. No team has even won third in a row since then.

== Qualified teams ==
Team	Previous finals app.
(Chile) Unión Española	None
(Argentina) Independiente	**1964**, **1965**, **1972**, **1973**, **1974**

Bold indicates winning years

== Venues ==
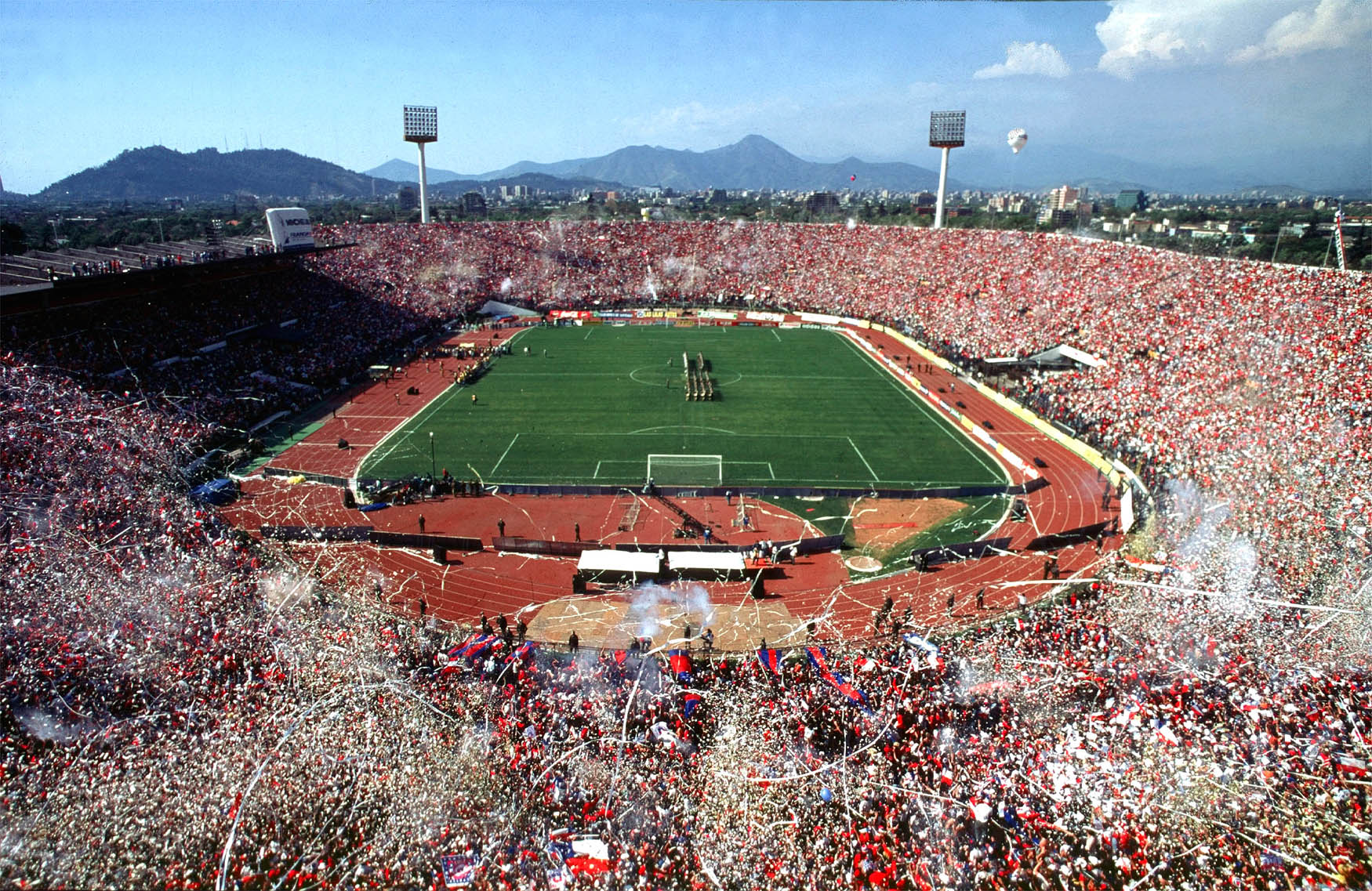
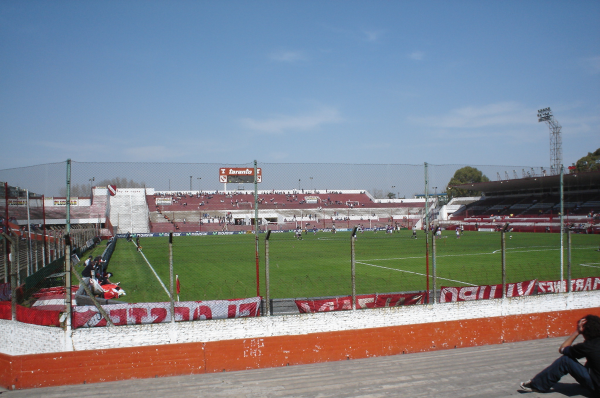
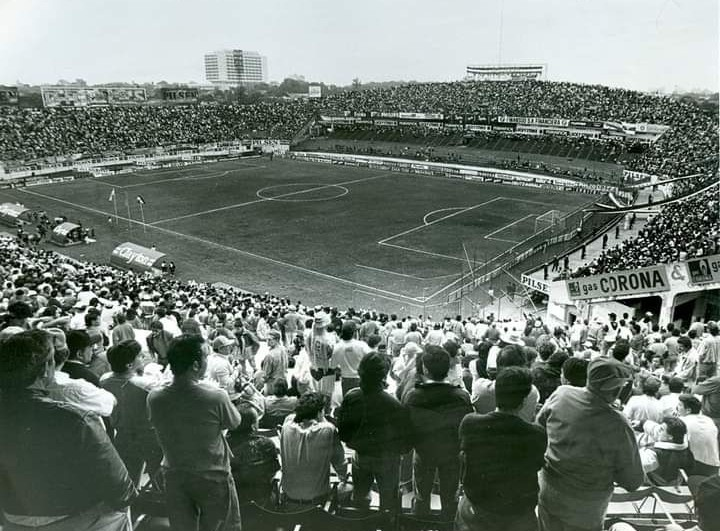
Estadio Nacional (Santiago), Estadio de Independiente (Avellaneda) and Estadio Defensores del Chaco (Asunción), venues for the finals

== Match details ==
=== First leg ===
1975 Copa Libertadores finals
18 June 1975
First leg

Unión Española (Chile)	1–0	(Argentina) Independiente
Ahumada 87'	Report

Estadio Nacional (Santiago)
Attendance: 43,200
Referee: José Martínez Bazán (Uruguay)

**Unión Española**	**Independiente**

GK	1	(Chile) Leopoldo Vallejos
DF	2	(Chile) Juan Machuca (c)
DF	5	(Chile) Hugo Berly
DF	4	(Chile) Mario Soto
DF	3	(Chile) Antonio Arias
MF	8	(Chile) Rubén Palacios
MF	9	(Chile) Francisco Las Heras	(substituted off) 78'
MF	13	(Chile) Reinaldo Hoffmann	(substituted off) 82'
MF	14	(Chile) Alejandro Trujillo
FW	12	(Chile) Sergio Ahumada
FW	10	(Argentina) Jorge Spedaletti
Substitutes:
MF		(Chile) Eddio Inostroza	(substituted on) 78'
FW		(Chile) Luis Miranda	(substituted on) 82'
Manager:
(Chile) Luis Santibáñez

GK		(Argentina) José Alberto Pérez
DF		(Argentina) Eduardo Commisso
DF		(Argentina) Francisco Sá (c)
DF		(Argentina) Alejandro Semenewicz
DF	**13**	(Uruguay) Ricardo Pavoni
MF	**10**	(Argentina) Ricardo Bochini
MF		(Argentina) Rubén Galván
MF		(Peru) Percy Rojas
FW		(Argentina) Agustín Balbuena
FW		(Argentina) Ricardo Ruiz Moreno
FW		(Argentina) Daniel Bertoni	(substituted off) 78'
Substitutes:
FW		(Argentina) Luis Giribet	(substituted on) 78'
Manager:
(Argentina) Pedro Dellacha

=== Second leg ===
25 June 1975
Second leg

Independiente (Argentina)	3–1	(Chile) Unión Española
Percy Rojas 1'; Pavoni 57'; Daniel Bertoni 82'	Report	Las Heras 15'

Independiente Stadium, Avellaneda
Attendance: 60,000
Referee: Rubén Barreto (Uruguay)

**Independiente**	**Unión Española**

GK		(Argentina) José Alberto Pérez
DF		(Argentina) Eduardo Commisso
DF		(Argentina) Francisco Sá (c)
DF		(Argentina) Alejandro Semenewicz
DF	**13**	(Uruguay) Ricardo Pavoni
MF	**10**	(Argentina) Ricardo Bochini
MF		(Argentina) Rubén Galván
FW		(Argentina) Agustín Balbuena
FW		(Argentina) Ricardo Ruiz Moreno
FW		(Peru) Percy Rojas
FW		(Argentina) Daniel Bertoni
Manager:
(Argentina) Pedro Dellacha

GK	(Chile) Leopoldo Vallejos
DF	(Chile) Juan Machuca (c)
DF	(Chile) Hugo Berly
DF	(Chile) Mario Soto
DF	(Chile) Antonio Arias
MF	(Chile) Rubén Palacios
MF	(Chile) Francisco Las Heras	(substituted off) 63'
MF	(Chile) Eddio Inostroza
MF	(Chile) Leonardo Véliz	(substituted off) 65'
FW	(Chile) Sergio Ahumada
FW	(Argentina) Jorge Spedaletti
Substitutes:
DF	(Chile) Mario Maldonado	(substituted on) 63'
MF	(Chile) Alejandro Trujillo	(substituted on) 65'
Manager:
(Chile) Luis Santibáñez

=== Playoff ===
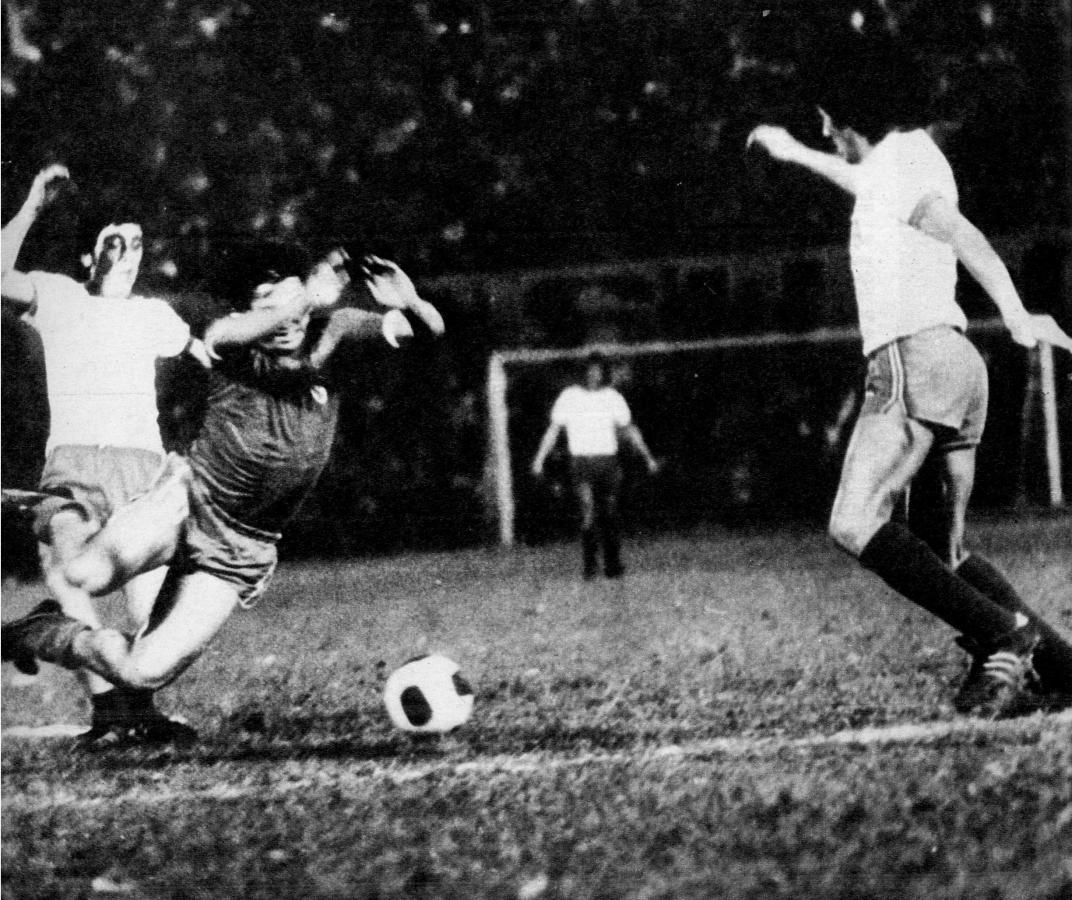
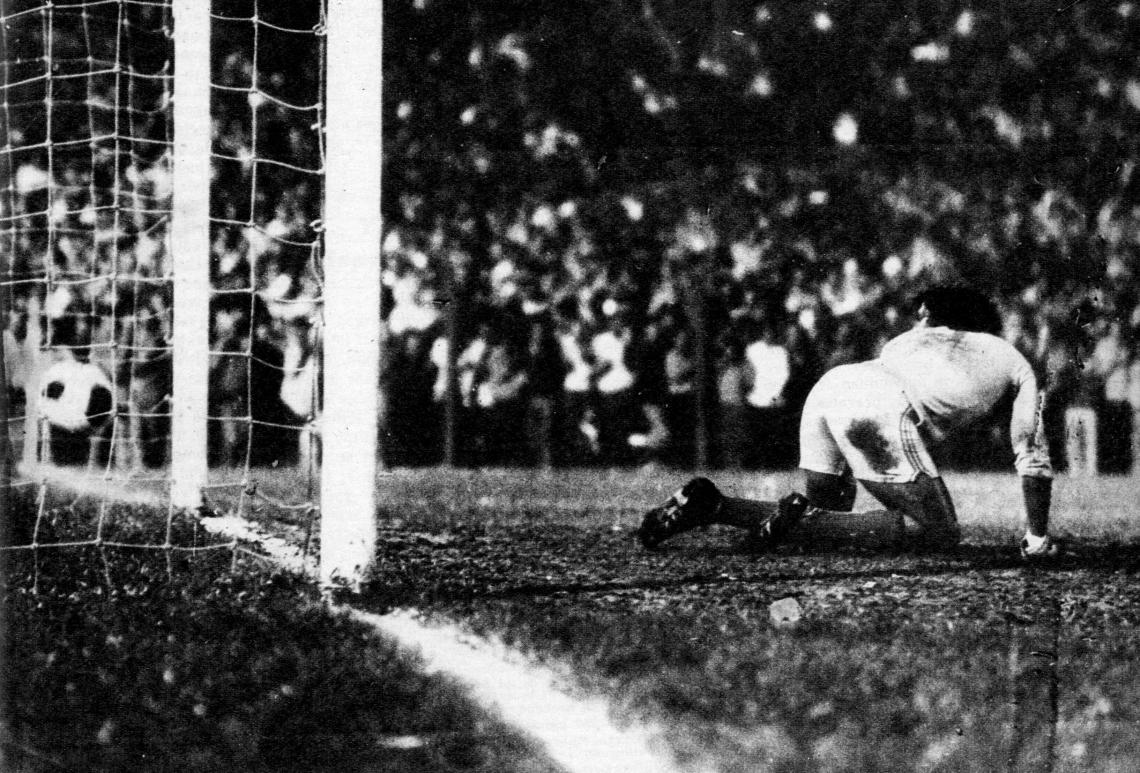
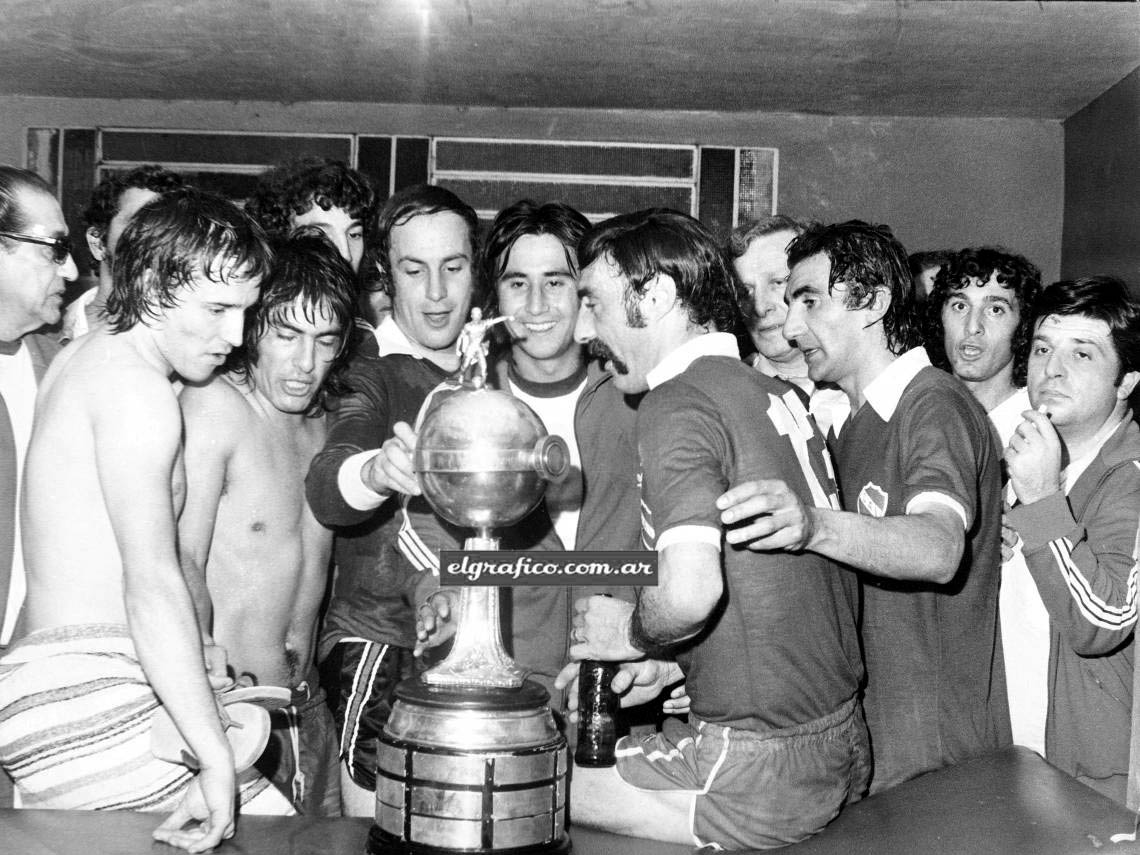
Some moments of the match and the celebrations with the cup
29 June 1975
Playoff

Independiente (Argentina)	2–0	(Chile) Unión Española
Ruiz Moreno 29'; Bertoni 62'	Report

Estadio Defensores del Chaco, Asunción
Attendance: 55,000
Referee: Edison Pérez (Peru)

**Independiente**	**Unión Española**

GK		(Argentina) José Alberto Pérez
DF		(Argentina) Eduardo Commisso
DF		(Argentina) Francisco Sá (c)
DF		(Argentina) Miguel Ángel López
DF	**13**	(Uruguay) Ricardo Pavoni
MF		(Argentina) Alejandro Semenewicz
MF		(Argentina) Rubén Galván
MF	**10**	(Argentina) Ricardo Bochini
FW		(Argentina) Agustín Balbuena
FW		(Argentina) Ricardo Ruiz Moreno
FW		(Argentina) Daniel Bertoni	(substituted off) 78'
Substitutes:
FW		(Argentina) Hugo Saggiorato	(substituted on) 78'
Manager:
(Argentina) Pedro Dellacha

GK	(Chile) Leopoldo Vallejos
DF	(Chile) Juan Machuca (c)
DF	(Chile) Mario Maldonado
DF	(Chile) Manuel Gaete
DF	(Chile) Antonio Arias
MF	(Chile) Alejandro Trujillo
MF	(Chile) Rubén Palacios
MF	(Chile) Eddio Inostroza	(substituted off) 46'
MF	(Chile) Leonardo Véliz
FW	(Chile) Sergio Ahumada
FW	(Argentina) Jorge Spedaletti
Substitutes:
MF	(Chile) Francisco Las Heras	(substituted on) 46'
Manager:
(Chile) Luis Santibáñez
