= Jorge Arias =

Jorge Arias may refer to:

- Sin Cara (Jose Jorge Arriaga Rodriguez, born 1977), Mexican-American professional wrestler
- Jorge Arias (swimmer) (born 1972), Peruvian swimmer
- Jorge Arias (Colombian footballer) (born 1992), Colombian footballer
- Jorge Arias (Chilean footballer) (born 1952)
