= Francisco Las Heras =

Chilean footballer (born 1949)

Personal information
- Full name: Francisco José Las Heras Risso
- Date of birth: 21 August 1949 (age 77)
- Place of birth: Santiago, Chile
- Position: Midfielder

Youth career
- Universidad de Chile

Senior career*
Years	Team	Apps	(Gls)
1967–1972	Universidad de Chile	84	(11)
1972–1975	Unión Española	56	(13)
1975–1977	Tecos	28	(3)
1977–1979	Unión Española	68	(4)
1980	Coquimbo Unido	26	(0)
1981	Deportes Aviación		

International career
1975	Chile	4	(0)
- * Club domestic league appearances and goals

Francisco José Las Heras Risso (born 21 August 1949) is a Chilean former footballer who played as a midfielder. He played for Universidad de Chile, Unión Española, Coquimbo Unido and Deportes Aviación, winning titles with the first two, and also played for Mexican club Tecos. Internationally, he represented Chile at the 1975 Copa América.

== Life and career ==
Las Heras, the son of Francisco Las Heras Marrodán who played football for Chile in the 1940s, attended the Instituto Alonso de Ercilla in Santiago and studied at the University of Chile. He began his football career in the youth system of the Primera División club associated with that university, Universidad de Chile, and made his first-team debut at the age of 17, contributing to their 1967 title. He appeared infrequently for the next couple of seasons as the team won another Primera title, in 1969, as well as two Torneo Metropolitanos, but became a regular from 1970 onwards.

In 1973, Las Heras signed for Unión Española, with whom he won two Primera titles in three seasons as well as reaching the final of the 1975 Copa Libertadores. Facing the Argentine superstars of Independiente, Unión Española won the first leg 1–0 with a late goal, but lost the second leg 3–1 – the goal scored by Las Heras with a penalty – in a controversial match in which the Chilean players blamed weak refereeing for the defeat. In the days before the away goals rule, a play-off in a neutral country decided the result: Independiente beat Unión Española 2–0 to win their fourth consecutive Copa Libertadores.

Las Heras was included in Chile's squad for the 1975 Copa América. He made his debut on 17 July, in the starting eleven for Chile's first group match, a 1–1 draw with Peru in Santiago, and started all three remaining group matches. Chile finished second in their group, but only the group winners progressed to the next stage of the competition. Those were his only appearances at senior international level.

After his international commitments ended, Las Heras joined Tecos, newly promoted to the Mexican Primera División. He played in 26 matches, half in the starting eleven, half as substitute, as they qualified for the playoffs. He made the last of his 30 league appearances on matchday 10 of the following season, before returning to Union Española. He won his third Primera División title with the club in 1977. After two more years, he moved on to another Primera club, Coquimbo Unido, and then spent the 1981 season with Deportes Aviación of the Segunda División.

After retiring from football, Las Heras worked in the pharmaceutical industry.

== Honours ==
Universidad de Chile

- Torneo Metropolitano: 1968, 1969
- Chilean Primera División: 1967, 1969
- Copa Francisco Candelori: 1969

Unión Española

- Chilean Primera División: 1973, 1975, 1977
- Copa Libertadores runners-up: 1975
