= Recopa Sudamericana (disambiguation) =

Recopa Sudamericana may refer to:

- Recopa Sudamericana, a football competition organized by CONMEBOL that pits the winners of the Copa Libertadores against the winners of the Copa Sudamericana.
- Recopa Sudamericana de Clubes, a football competition organized by CONMEBOL that was contested by the winners of all South American domestic cup competitions.
- Recopa Sudamericana de Campeones Intercontinentales, a football competition organized by CONMEBOL that was contested by the South American winners of the Intercontinental Cup.

== See also ==
- Super Cup
