= 1977 Campeonato Nacional Primera División =

Campeonato Nacional 1977
- Dates: 16 April 1977 – 18 December 1977
- Champions: Unión Española (5th title)
- Relegated: Regional Antofagasta; Deportes Ovalle; Santiago Wanderers (Promotion Lig.)
- 1978 Copa Libertadores: Unión Española; Palestino
- Matches: 307
- Goals: 860 (2.8 per match)
- Top goalscorer: Oscar Fabbiani (34 goals)
- Biggest home win: Unión Española 7–0 Green Cross Temuco (31 July); Unión Española 7–0 O'Higgins (15 October)
- Highest attendance: 54,336 Universidad de Chile 4–5 Colo-Colo (17 July)
- Total attendance: 1,970,085
- Average attendance: 6,417

The 1977 Campeonato Nacional de Fútbol Profesional was first tier's 45th season. Unión Española was the tournament's champion, winning its fifth title.

== Standings ==
Pos	Team	Pld	W	D	L	GF	GA	GD	Pts	Qualification or relegation
1	Unión Española	34	21	9	4	72	28	+44	51	Champions & qualified to 1978 Copa Libertadores
2	Everton	34	20	9	5	64	38	+26	49	Qualified to Liguilla Pre-Libertadores
3	Palestino	34	18	11	5	70	33	+37	47	Qualified to Liguilla Pre-Libertadores
4	Colo-Colo	34	15	12	7	56	43	+13	42	Qualified to Liguilla Pre-Libertadores
5	Universidad de Chile	34	13	13	8	50	35	+15	39	Qualified to Liguilla Pre-Libertadores
6	Lota Schwager	34	11	14	9	46	45	+1	36	
7	Deportes Concepción	34	14	7	13	48	52	−4	35	
8	Aviación	34	12	10	12	46	51	−5	34	
9	Audax Italiano	34	12	9	13	48	53	−5	33	
10	O'Higgins	34	10	11	13	40	44	−4	31	
11	Huachipato	34	9	12	13	39	46	−7	30	
12	Green Cross Temuco	34	10	10	14	46	62	−16	30	
13	Ñublense	34	8	12	14	38	45	−7	28	
14	Universidad Católica	34	8	12	14	36	48	−12	28	
15	Santiago Wanderers	34	9	10	15	50	66	−16	28	Qualified to promotion play-off
16	Deportes Ovalle	34	6	15	13	42	52	−10	27	Qualified to promotion/relegation Liguilla
17	Santiago Morning	34	9	9	16	37	50	−13	27	Qualified to promotion/relegation Liguilla
18	Regional Antofagasta	34	5	7	22	29	66	−37	17	Relegated to Segunda División

Campeonato Nacional
1977 champions
Unión Española
5th title

== Scores ==
Home \ Away	ANT	AUD	AVI	COL	DCO	EVE	GCT	HUA	LOT	ÑUB	OHI	DOV	PAL	SMO	UCA	UCH	UES	SWA
Antofagasta		2–3	1–0	0–1	1–1	1–2	1–1	2–3	1–1	0–0	0–2	0–2	1–1	1–5	1–0	0–0	1–3	0–1
Audax	2–1		3–2	0–2	0–0	1–2	1–1	2–0	1–2	3–1	1–0	1–1	1–3	1–1	2–1	2–0	2–3	2–3
Aviación	1–0	2–0		2–1	1–2	0–2	6–4	3–1	0–2	3–1	2–1	1–3	1–3	1–0	0–0	0–3	1–1	1–1
Colo-Colo	2–3	0–1	2–1		2–0	3–1	3–1	0–3	2–0	1–1	1–1	4–2	1–0	1–1	3–3	1–0	1–3	2–0
Concepción	4–2	1–0	2–1	0–1		1–4	2–2	1–1	1–0	1–0	1–0	4–1	1–5	1–1	2–0	2–1	0–3	4–2
Everton	3–0	4–2	2–0	3–1	2–1		1–1	2–0	1–1	1–0	1–2	1–0	0–0	4–0	3–1	1–1	1–1	3–1
Green Cross T.	2–1	4–3	1–1	2–2	1–3	3–2		1–0	3–2	2–1	1–0	1–1	0–1	1–1	2–1	0–0	0–1	3–3
Huachipato	0–0	2–2	1–1	0–0	1–3	1–2	3–0		1–1	2–2	2–1	2–1	1–1	1–0	2–2	0–1	1–4	1–0
Lota S.	3–1	0–0	0–1	2–2	4–1	2–2	3–1	1–0		0–0	0–2	2–2	0–1	1–0	3–0	0–3	0–2	2–2
Ñublense	5–0	2–0	0–1	0–1	3–1	1–1	1–3	2–1	1–1		1–3	0–0	2–1	2–1	0–0	2–2	1–2	3–1
O'Higgins	2–0	0–1	0–1	1–1	3–1	1–1	1–1	2–0	0–0	5–2		2–0	1–1	1–1	1–1	1–1	1–0	2–2
Ovalle	3–1	4–2	2–2	0–0	0–2	2–0	1–1	1–2	1–1	0–0	2–1		1–2	1–1	1–0	2–3	1–2	2–1
Palestino	3–0	3–3	0–0	1–1	2–0	6–1	1–1	1–0	5–1	3–1	4–2	2–1		3–1	1–1	0–0	1–3	4–1
S. Morning	2–1	0–0	4–4	1–4	0–0	0–2	2–1	2–2	1–2	0–0	2–0	2–0	0–5		3–1	1–1	0–0	1–1
U. Católica	3–1	1–2	1–3	2–2	1–0	1–1	2–1	2–0	0–2	0–1	0–0	2–1	2–1	1–1		1–1	1–1	2–1
U. de Chile	0–1	1–1	1–1	4–5	4–2	0–2	1–0	1–1	0–1	1–0	4–1	3–0	3–2	3–2	2–0		0–0	1–2
U. Española	2–4	2–0	5–1	1–0	1–0	1–1	7–0	2–2	1–1	1–0	7–0	2–0	0–2	2–0	2–3	0–0		3–1
S. Wanderers	3–0	2–3	1–1	3–3	1–3	3–4	3–1	0–2	4–4	1–1	1–0	2–1	1–1	1–0	1–0	0–4	0–2	

Legend: Blue = home team win; Yellow = draw; Red = away team win.

== Relegation playoff ==
27 November 1977	Santiago Morning	2 – 1	Deportes Ovalle	Estadio Municipal, Valparaíso
	Toro 16'; Pecoraro 90'		Ortíz 30'	Attendance: 4,812; Referee: Mario Castro

Deportes Ovalle relegated to Segunda División

== Topscorer ==
Name	Team	Goals
(Argentina) Oscar Fabbiani	Palestino	34

== Liguilla Pre-Copa Libertadores ==
20 December 1977	Universidad de Chile	0 – 1	Palestino	Estadio Nacional, Santiago
			66' Pinto	Attendance: 33,879; Referee: A. Martínez

20 December 1977	Colo-Colo	1 – 0	Everton	Estadio Nacional, Santiago
	Orellana 64'			Attendance: 33,879; Referee: R. Hormazábal

22 December 1977	Palestino	2 – 2	Everton	Estadio Nacional, Santiago
	Fabbiani 83'; Dubó 90'		43' Ceballos; 75' Spedaletti	Attendance: 29,370; Referee: S. Vásquez

22 December 1977	Colo-Colo	2 – 2	Universidad de Chile	Estadio Nacional, Santiago
	Orellana 5', 78'		7' Socías; 85' Pellegrini	Attendance: 29,370; Referee: J. Silvagno

27 December 1977	Universidad de Chile	2 – 4	Everton	Estadio Nacional, Santiago
	Barrera 39'; Neumann 65'		5', 33' Martínez; 17', 27' Salinas	Attendance: 56,723; Referee: J. Carvajal

27 December 1977	Colo-Colo	1 – 2	Palestino	Estadio Nacional, Santiago
	Brunel 67'		8' Rojas; 71' Fabbiani	Attendance: 56,723; Referee: M. Lira

Pos	Team	Pld	W	D	L	GF	GA	GD	Pts	PD
1	Palestino	3	2	1	0	5	3	+2	5	Qualified to 1978 Copa Libertadores
2	Everton	3	1	1	1	6	5	+1	3	
3	Colo-Colo	3	1	1	1	4	4	0	3	
4	Universidad de Chile	3	0	1	2	4	7	−3	1	

Source: rsssf.com

== Promotion/relegation Liguilla ==
Pos	Team	Pld	W	D	L	GF	GA	GD	Pts	Qualification
1	Santiago Morning	3	2	1	0	7	3	+4	5	
2	Cobreloa	3	1	2	0	5	2	+3	4	Promoted to Primera División
3	Santiago Wanderers	3	0	2	1	3	6	−3	2	Relegated to Segunda División
4	Malleco Unido	3	0	1	2	2	6	−4	1	

Source: rsssf.com

== See also ==
- 1977 Copa Chile
