= Torneo de Copa Alfredo Lois =

- Organising body: AUF
- Founded: 1969
- Abolished: 1969; 56 years ago
- Region: Uruguay
- International cup(s): Copa Ganadores de Copa
- Last champions: Rampla Juniors
- Most successful team(s): Rampla Juniors (1 title)

The Torneo de Copa Alfredo Lois was a Uruguayan football tournament organized by the Uruguayan Football Association in 1969.

It was created with the aim of awarding a qualifier to the first (and only valid) edition of the 1970 Copa Ganadores de Copa.

== List of champions ==
Ed.	Year	Champion	Runner-up	Third place
1	1969	Rampla Juniors	Danubio	Nacional

== Titles by club ==
Club	Titles	Years won
Rampla Juniors	1	1969

== 1969 Torneo de Copa Alfredo Lois ==
=== Qualified teams ===
The following teams qualified for the competition.

Serie A	Serie B
Alto Perú; Cerro; Defensor Sporting; Montevideo Wanderers; Nacional; Progreso; River Plate; Sud América	Bella Vista; Central Español; Danubio; Huracán Buceo; Liverpool; Peñarol; Racing; Rampla Juniors

=== Semifinals ===
17 June 1969	Rampla Juniors	5–3	Nacional	Estadio Centenario

June 1969	Danubio	2–2	Sud América	Estadio Centenario

=== Third place ===
22 June 1969	Nacional	2–1	Sud América	Estadio Parque Central

=== Final ===
22 June 1969	Rampla Juniors	3–1	Danubio	Estadio Centenario
