= Luis Santibáñez =

Chilean football manager

Personal information
- Full name: Luis Alberto Santibáñez Díaz
- Date of birth: 7 February 1936
- Place of birth: Antofagasta, Chile
- Date of death: 5 September 2008 (aged 72)
- Place of death: Santiago, Chile
- Height: 1.75 m (5 ft 9 in)

Managerial career
- Years: Team
- 1966: Antofagasta Portuario
- 1968: Trasandino
- 1969: Coquimbo Unido
- 1970–1972: Unión San Felipe
- 1973–1974: Unión Española
- 1974: Deportes Ovalle
- 1974–1977: Unión Española
- 1977–1982: Chile
- 1978–1980: O'Higgins
- 1981–1982: Universidad Católica
- 1983: Universidad de Chile
- 1984: O'Higgins
- 1985: Huachipato
- 1985–1986: Barcelona SC
- 1987–1988: Filanbanco
- 1988: Unión Española
- 1989: Deportes La Serena
- 1990: Santiago Wanderers
- 1991–1992: Deportes Temuco
- 1992: Everton
- 1993: Coquimbo Unido
- 1995: LDU Portoviejo
- 2000: Al-Arabi SC
- 2001: Deportes Arica
- 2005: Fernández Vial

Luis Alberto Santibáñez Díaz (7 February 1936 – 5 September 2008) was a Chilean football manager.

As a team coach he won the Chilean title four times, once with Unión San Felipe (1971) and three times with Unión Española (1973, 1975, and 1977).

He served as manager of the Chile national football team between 1977 and 1982, which included qualification for the 1982 FIFA World Cup in Spain. There Chile was eliminated in the first round, in a group with Algeria, Austria and West Germany, losing all three matches.

== Honours ==
=== Club ===
Unión San Felipe

- Segunda División de Chile: 1971
- Primera División de Chile: 1972

Unión Española

- Primera División de Chile (3): 1973, 1975, 1977

Barcelona Sporting Club

- Serie A de Ecuador: 1985
