= List of CONMEBOL club competition winners =

The South American Football Confederation (CONMEBOL) is the administrative and controlling body for South American association football. It currently organizes three club competitions: the Copa Libertadores, the Copa Sudamericana and the Recopa Sudamericana. CONMEBOL was also responsible for the running of several other discontinued competitions, the most notable of which were the Supercopa Libertadores (from 1989 to 1997), the Copa CONMEBOL (from 1992 to 1999), the Copa Mercosur and the Copa Merconorte (from 1998 to 2001). It also held minor continental Copas, some of them with only one edition: the Copa de Oro, Copa Master de Supercopa and Copa Master de CONMEBOL in the 1990s, and the Copa Ganadores de Copa in 1970.

At intercontinental level, together with the Union of European Football Associations (UEFA), CONMEBOL organized the Intercontinental Cup, which was held from 1960 to 2004, and two editions of the Intercontinental Champions' Supercup, in the 1960s. With the Confederation of North, Central America and Caribbean Association Football (CONCACAF), the South American confederation jointly held the Copa Interamericana intermittently from 1969 to 1998. It also organized the Suruga Bank Championship (held in conjunction with the Japan Football Association from 2008 to 2023). Included in this list is the FIFA Club World Cup, a FIFA club competition that merged with the Intercontinental Cup in 2005.

== Winners ==
=== By club ===
Boca Juniors and Independiente, from Argentina, have won the most CONMEBOL club competitions, with 18. Brazil's São Paulo and Argentina's River Plate follow in the list, having won 12 competitions. Boca Juniors holds the record for the most Recopa Sudamericana titles, winning it four times, and two Copa Sudamericana titles, a joint-record with Independiente, Brazil's Athletico Paranaense and Independiente del Valle from Ecuador. It is also one of the best performing teams in the Intercontinental Cup, with three titles, a joint-record with Uruguayan clubs Peñarol and Nacional. Independiente is the most successful club in the Copa Libertadores, being champions seven times (four in row, record), and in the Copa Interamericana, with three titles. Two titles is the record in the Supercopa Libertadores, jointly held by Independiente and Cruzeiro from Brazil. Brazilian club Atlético Mineiro and Colombia's Atlético Nacional are the best performing clubs in the Copa CONMEBOL and the Copa Merconorte, respectively, also with two titles. No club has ever won all the competitions, but Independiente, Boca Juniors, São Paulo and River Plate have won seven different CONMEBOL tournaments. River Plate is the first and only team to simultaneously hold CONMEBOL's four current international competitions, after winning the 2014 Copa Sudamericana, 2015 Recopa Sudamericana, the 2015 Copa Libertadores, and the 2015 Suruga Bank Championship.

The following table lists the total number of CONMEBOL club competitions won by clubs, and is updated as of 13 December 2025, in chronological order.

Key

CL	Copa Libertadores
IC	Copa Intercontinental/FIFA Club World Cup
CHA	FIFA Challenger Cup
DA	FIFA Derby of the Americas
CS	Copa Sudamericana
SL	Supercopa Libertadores
CC	Copa CONMEBOL
RS	Recopa Sudamericana
SCI	Intercontinental Champions' Supercup
SB	Suruga Bank Championship
MN	Copa Merconorte
MS	Copa Mercosur
CO	Copa de Oro
CMS	Copa Master de Supercopa
CMC	Copa Master de CONMEBOL
CGC	Copa Ganadores de Copa
IA	Copa Interamericana

List of CONMEBOL club competition winners
Rank.	Club	Country	CL	IC	CHA	DA	CS	SL	CC	RS	SCI	SB	MN	MS	CO	CMS	CMC	CGC	IA	Total
1	Boca Juniors	Argentina	6	3	0	0	3	1	0	4	0	0	0	0	1	1	0	0	0	19
2	Independiente	Argentina	7	2	0	0	2	2	0	1	0	1	0	0	0	0	0	0	3	18
3	River Plate	Argentina	4	1	0	0	1	1	0	3	0	1	0	0	0	0	0	0	1	12
4	São Paulo	Brazil	3	3	0	0	1	1	1	2	0	0	0	0	0	0	1	0	0	12
5	Flamengo	Brazil	4	1	1	1	0	0	0	1	0	0	0	1	1	0	0	0	0	10
6	Peñarol	Uruguay	5	3	0	0	0	0	0	0	1	0	0	0	0	0	0	0	0	9
7	Nacional	Uruguay	3	3	0	0	0	0	0	1	0	0	0	0	0	0	0	0	2	9
8	Santos	Brazil	3	2	0	0	0	0	1	1	1	0	0	0	0	0	0	0	0	8
9	Olimpia	Paraguay	3	1	0	0	0	1	0	2	0	0	0	0	0	0	0	0	1	8
10	Internacional	Brazil	2	1	0	0	1	0	0	2	0	1	0	0	0	0	0	0	0	7
11	Cruzeiro	Brazil	2	0	0	0	0	2	0	1	0	0	0	0	1	1	0	0	0	7
12	Atlético Nacional	Colombia	2	0	0	0	0	0	0	1	0	0	2	0	0	0	0	0	2	7
13	Estudiantes	Argentina	4	1	0	0	0	0	0	0	0	0	0	0	0	0	0	0	1	6
14	Grêmio	Brazil	3	1	0	0	0	0	0	2	0	0	0	0	0	0	0	0	0	6
15	Palmeiras	Brazil	3	0	0	0	0	0	0	1	0	0	0	1	0	0	0	0	0	5
16	Racing	Argentina	1	1	0	0	1	1	0	1	0	0	0	0	0	0	0	0	0	5
17	Vélez Sársfield	Argentina	1	1	0	0	0	1	0	1	0	0	0	0	0	0	0	0	1	5
18	LDU Quito	Ecuador	1	0	0	0	2	0	0	2	0	0	0	0	0	0	0	0	0	5
19	Corinthians	Brazil	1	2	0	0	0	0	0	1	0	0	0	0	0	0	0	0	0	4
20	Atlético Mineiro	Brazil	1	0	0	0	0	0	2	1	0	0	0	0	0	0	0	0	0	4
22	Colo-Colo	Chile	1	0	0	0	0	0	0	1	0	0	0	0	0	0	0	0	1	3
23	San Lorenzo	Argentina	1	0	0	0	1	0	0	0	0	0	0	1	0	0	0	0	0	3
24	Independiente del Valle	Ecuador	0	0	0	0	2	0	0	1	0	0	0	0	0	0	0	0	0	3
21	Lanús	Argentina	0	0	0	0	2	0	1	1	0	0	0	0	0	0	0	0	0	4
25	Athletico Paranaense	Brazil	0	0	0	0	2	0	0	0	0	1	0	0	0	0	0	0	0	3
26	Pachuca	Mexico	0	0	1	1	1	0	0	0	0	0	0	0	0	0	0	0	0	3
27	Argentinos Juniors	Argentina	1	0	0	0	0	0	0	0	0	0	0	0	0	0	0	0	1	2
28	Botafogo	Brazil	1	0	0	0	0	0	1	0	0	0	0	0	0	0	0	0	0	2
29	Fluminense	Brazil	1	0	0	0	0	0	0	1	0	0	0	0	0	0	0	0	0	2
30	Vasco da Gama	Brazil	1	0	0	0	0	0	0	0	0	0	0	1	0	0	0	0	0	2
31	Cienciano	Peru	0	0	0	0	1	0	0	1	0	0	0	0	0	0	0	0	0	2
32	Defensa y Justicia	Argentina	0	0	0	0	1	0	0	1	0	0	0	0	0	0	0	0	0	2
33	Arsenal	Argentina	0	0	0	0	1	0	0	0	0	1	0	0	0	0	0	0	0	2
34	Santa Fe	Colombia	0	0	0	0	1	0	0	0	0	1	0	0	0	0	0	0	0	2
35	Mariscal Santa Cruz	Bolivia	0	0	0	0	0	0	0	0	0	0	0	0	0	0	0	1	0	1
36	Universidad Católica	Chile	0	0	0	0	0	0	0	0	0	0	0	0	0	0	0	0	1	1
37	Rosario Central	Argentina	0	0	0	0	0	0	1	0	0	0	0	0	0	0	0	0	0	1
38	Talleres	Argentina	0	0	0	0	0	0	1	0	0	0	0	0	0	0	0	0	0	1
39	América de Cali	Colombia	0	0	0	0	0	0	0	0	0	0	1	0	0	0	0	0	0	1
40	Millonarios	Colombia	0	0	0	0	0	0	0	0	0	0	1	0	0	0	0	0	0	1
41	Once Caldas	Colombia	1	0	0	0	0	0	0	0	0	0	0	0	0	0	0	0	0	1
42	Universidad de Chile	Chile	0	0	0	0	1	0	0	0	0	0	0	0	0	0	0	0	0	1
43	Chapecoense	Brazil	0	0	0	0	1	0	0	0	0	0	0	0	0	0	0	0	0	1

=== By country ===
Argentine clubs are the most successful in CONMEBOL competitions, having won 78 titles. Argentine clubs have won the Copa Libertadores a record 25 times, and have also won the most Copa Sudamericana, Intercontinental Cup, and Supercopa Libertadores titles. Brazilian clubs, with 72 titles in total (68 with the FIFA Club World Cup titles added), have more wins in the Copa CONMEBOL, the Recopa Sudamericana, and the Copa Mercosur. Uruguayan clubs are third in total number of CONMEBOL trophies won, with 18. Venezuela is the only CONMEBOL member federation whose clubs have never won any competition at an international level, while a Mexican club (from CONCACAF) has won a South American club competition once.

The following table lists the total number of titles won by clubs from each country, and is updated as of 10 December 2025.

Key

CL	Copa Libertadores
IC	Copa Intercontinental/FIFA Club World Cup
CHA	FIFA Challenger Cup
DA	FIFA Derby of the Americas
CS	Copa Sudamericana
SL	Supercopa Libertadores
CC	Copa CONMEBOL
RS	Recopa Sudamericana
SCI	Intercontinental Champions' Supercup
SB	Suruga Bank Championship
MN	Copa Merconorte
MS	Copa Mercosur
CO	Copa de Oro
CMS	Copa Master de Supercopa
CMC	Copa Master de CONMEBOL
CGC	Copa Ganadores de Copa
IA	Copa Interamericana

List of CONMEBOL club competition winners by country
Nationality	CL	IC	CHA	DA	CS	SL	CC	RS	SCI	SB	MN	MS	CO	CMS	CMC	CGC	IA	Total
Argentina	25	9	0	0	12	6	3	12	0	3	0	1	1	1	0	0	7	80
Brazil	25	10	1	1	5	3	5	13	1	2	0	3	2	1	1	0	0	73
Uruguay	8	6	0	0	0	0	0	1	1	0	0	0	0	0	0	0	2	18
Colombia	3	0	0	0	1	0	0	0	1	1	4	0	0	0	0	0	2	12
Paraguay	3	1	0	0	0	1	0	2	0	0	0	0	0	0	0	0	1	8
Ecuador	1	0	0	0	4	0	0	3	0	0	0	0	0	0	0	0	0	8
Chile	1	0	0	0	1	0	0	1	0	0	0	0	0	0	0	0	2	5
Mexico	0	0	1	1	1	0	0	0	0	0	0	0	0	0	0	0	0	3
Peru	0	0	0	0	1	0	0	1	0	0	0	0	0	0	0	0	0	2
Bolivia	0	0	0	0	0	0	0	0	0	0	0	0	0	0	0	1	0	1

== See also ==
- List of UEFA club competition winners
- List of football clubs by competitive honours won
