= Jorge Arias (Chilean footballer) =

Chilean footballer

Personal information
- Full name: Jorge Leonardo Arias Mujica
- Date of birth: 24 July 1952 (age 74)
- Place of birth: San Miguel, Santiago, Chile
- Height: 1.69 m (5 ft 7 in)
- Position: Midfielder

Youth career
- Lautaro San Gregorio
- 1967–1970: Magallanes

Senior career*
Years	Team	Apps	(Gls)
1971–1975	Magallanes	91	(15)
1971	→ Independiente Cauquenes (loan)		
1972	→ Audax Italiano (loan)		
1975–1977	Levante	7	(2)
1978	Unión Española	11	(1)
1979	Deportes Ovalle		
1980–1981	Ñublense	11	(0)
1983–1984	Green Cross-Temuco	62	(8)
1985	Magallanes	20	(1)
1986–1988	Good Year		
1989	Deportes Maipo		
1992	Municipal Talagante		
1993	Magallanes		
1993	Deportes Antofagasta	9	(0)
1994	Santiago Wanderers		
1995–1996	Magallanes		

International career
1971	Chile U20		
- * Club domestic league appearances and goals

Jorge Leonardo Arias Mujica (born 24 July 1952) is a Chilean former professional footballer who played as a midfielder for clubs in Chile and Spain.

== Club career ==
As a child, Arias was with club Lautaro from San Gregorio neighborhood. He came to Magallanes at the age of fourteen and made his debut in 1972. He also played for Independiente de Cauquenes and Audax Italiano in the second level.

After playing for Magallanes, he joined Spanish side Levante UD thanks to his compatriot Carlos Caszely and spent three seasons with them, making seven appearances and scoring two goals in the 1976–77 season.

Back in Chile, he played for Unión Española, Deportes Ovalle, Ñublense, Green Cross-Temuco and Magallanes again.

He ended his career playing for Good Year from Maipú and Deportes Maipo in the Chilean Tercera División.

But, he returned to play in 1992 for Municipal Talagante, Magallanes, Deportes Antofagasta and Santiago Wanderers. In 1995, he led Magallanes at the age of forty three as the team captain in the league title of the Chilean Tercera División, alongside players such as Darío Scatolaro, Carlos Vega and Cristian Olivares.

== International career ==
Arias represented Chile at under-20 level in the 1971 South American Championship with Fernando Riera as coach.

== Personal life ==
He has seven siblings and five of them were footballers who played for Magallanes: Juan, Antonio, a Chile international, Óscar, Enrique and Miguel Ángel.
