= Jorginho Carvoeiro =

Brazilian footballer (1953–1977)

Personal information
- Full name: Jorge Vieira
- Date of birth: 11 October 1953
- Place of birth: Castelo, Brazil
- Date of death: 13 July 1977 (aged 23)
- Place of death: Rio de Janeiro, Brazil
- Height: 1.71 m (5 ft 7 in)
- Position: Right winger

Youth career
- 1968–1971: Bangu

Senior career*
Years	Team	Apps	(Gls)
1971–1972	Bangu	23	(1)
1972–1975	Vasco da Gama	113	(16)

International career
1971	Brazil U20		
- * Club domestic league appearances and goals

Jorge Vieira (11 October 1953 – 13 July 1977), better known as Jorginho Carvoeiro, was a Brazilian footballer who played as a right winger.

== Career ==
Revealed in the Bangu youth sectors, Jorginho Carvoeiro was the highlight of the Brazil Under-20 team that won the Cannes Tournament in 1971. The following year, he was signed by Vasco da Gama, where he scored one of the goals in winning the 1974 Campeonato Brasileiro Série A. In April 1975 he retired from football after feeling ill and being diagnosed with leukemia.

== Death ==
Jorginho Carvoeiro died on 13 July 1977, after failing to respond to any of the treatments available at the time for his leukemia. He died at his home, in Ipanema, Rio de Janeiro.

== Honours ==
Vasco da Gama

- Campeonato Brasileiro: 1974

Brazil U20

- Tournoi de Cannes: 1971
