= Jaime Rojas =

Chilean footballer (born 1973)

Personal information
- Full name: Jaime Rodrigo Rojas Gallardo
- Date of birth: 4 April 1973 (age 53)
- Place of birth: Santiago, Chile
- Position: Midfielder

Youth career
- 1983–1993: Universidad Católica

Senior career*
Years	Team	Apps	(Gls)
1993–1996	Universidad Católica		
1993	→ Provincial Osorno (loan)	5	(0)
1996–1997	Provincial Osorno		
1997	PSM Makassar		
1998–1999	Persema Malang		
1999–2000	PSM Makassar		
2000–2001	PSMS Medan		
2001	Persema Malang		(1)
2001	Malang United		(7)
2001–2002	Arema Malang		
2002–2003	PSMS Medan		
2004	Persegi Bali		
- * Club domestic league appearances and goals

Jaime Rodrigo Rojas Gallardo (born 4 April 1973), also known as Jimmy Rojas, is a Chilean former professional footballer who played as a midfielder for clubs in Chile and Indonesia.

== Career ==
A product of Universidad Católica youth system, Rojas made his professional debut with that club. He also played in Chile for Provincial Osorno.

In 1997, he went to Indonesia and joined PSM Makassar. He after played for PSMS Medan, Persema Malang (later Malang United), where he coincided with his compatriot Carlos Vega, Arema Malang and Persegi Bali.

== After football ==
Rojas has spent time as a football agent of foreign players in the Indonesian football through his company Jima Sport. In addition, he started a football academy named Jima Sport Soccer Academy.

He has a motorcycle rental business called "Mr. Rental Bike" and a holiday home rental business.

He studies in Jakarta to become a football manager.

== Personal life ==
Rojas made his home in Bali.
