= Francisco Pinochet =

Chilean footballer (1947–1990)

- Pinochet in 1974

Personal information
- Full name: Francisco Segundo Pinochet Cifuentes
- Date of birth: 15 December 1947
- Place of birth: Concepción, Biobío, Chile
- Date of death: 15 May 1990 (aged 42)
- Position: Defender

Youth career
- 1951–???: Lord Cochrane
- ???–1965: Huachipato

Senior career*
Years	Team	Apps	(Gls)
1965–1972	Deportes Concepción		
1973–1976	Huachipato		

International career
1971–1975	Chile	10	(0)
- * Club domestic league appearances and goals

Francisco Segundo Pinochet Cifuentes (15 December 1947 – 25 June 2003) was a Chilean footballer. Nicknamed "Pinocho", he played for Deportes Concepción and Huachipato throughout the 1960s and the 1970s as a defender. He also represented his home country of Chile internationally in ten matches with his most notable participation being the Brazil Independence Cup.

== Club career ==
Born in Concepción, he would begin his football career at the age of four with Lord Cochrane. He would later be part of the youth sector of Huachipato to participate in the national youth tournament of 1965. In the same year, he would make his senior debut for Deportes Concepción in a regional derby match against Lota Schwager. He would play in the club until the 1972 Primera División de Chile where he would then play for Huachipato in the subsequent season. There, he would be part of the winning squad of the 1974 Primera División de Chile as well as participate in the 1975 Copa Libertadores where the club would be eliminated in the group stage where runners-up Unión Española would also play in.

== International career ==
Pinochet would represent Chile ten times throughout 1971 to 1975. He would make his official debut under the dual management of Luis Vera and Raúl Pino in a friendly against Paraguay on 14 July 1971. Other notable participations included the 1972 and 1974 editions of the Copa Carlos Dittborn as well as the 1972 Brazil Independence Cup. His final international match would be against Uruguay during the first match of the 1975 Copa Juan Pinto Durán on 4 June 1975.
