= Antonio Arias (footballer) =

Chilean footballer (born 1944)

Personal information
- Full name: José Antonio Arias Mujica
- Date of birth: October 9, 1944 (age 82)
- Place of birth: Santiago, Chile
- Height: 1.72 m (5 ft 7 1/2 in)
- Position: Left-back

Youth career
- Magallanes

Senior career*
Years	Team	Apps	(Gls)
1965–1968	Magallanes	108	(0)
1969–1979	Unión Española	300	(5)
1980	Palestino	11	(0)
Total		419	(5)

International career
1968–1977	Chile	32	(0)
- * Club domestic league appearances and goals

José Antonio Arias Mujica (born October 9, 1944), known as Antonio Arias, is a Chilean former football defender.

== Career ==
A product of Magallanes, Arias made his debut in 1965 and played for them until 1968.

In 1969, he switched to Unión Española, becoming a historical player of them, winning three league titles in 1973, 1975 and 1977. Along with them, he reached the final match in the 1975 Copa Libertadores.

He ended his career with Palestino in 1980.

At international level, he played for the Chile national team between 1968 and 1973, gaining 30 caps. He was part of the Chilean squad for the 1974 World Cup.

== Personal life ==
He has seven siblings and five of them were footballers who played for Magallanes: Juan, Óscar, Enrique, Jorge and Miguel Ángel.

He is nicknamed Chino (Chinese).
