= 1974 Campeonato Brasileiro Série A =

Campeonato Brasileiro Série A
- Season: 1974
- Champions: Vasco da Gama (1st title)
- Copa Libertadores de América: Vasco da Gama; Cruzeiro
- Matches: 447
- Goals: 945 (2.11 per match)
- Top goalscorer: Roberto Dinamite (Vasco da Gama) - 16 goals
- Biggest home win: Flamengo 6-0 Paysandu (July 17, 1974)
- Biggest away win: Desportiva Ferroviária 0-5 Grêmio (May 25, 1974); CSA 0-5 Atlético Mineiro (March 20, 1974)
- Average attendance: 11,599

The 1974 Campeonato Brasileiro Série A, officially the Quarto Campeonato Nacional de Clubes, was the 19th edition of the Campeonato Brasileiro Série A.

== Overview ==
It was contested by 40 teams, and Vasco da Gama won the championship.

== First phase ==
=== Group A ===
Pos	Team	Pld	W	D	L	GF	GA	GD	Pts	Qualification
1	Grêmio	19	14	2	3	30	8	+22	30	Qualified to Second phase
2	Flamengo	19	12	5	2	29	8	+21	29	Qualified to Second phase
3	América-RJ	19	12	2	5	30	15	+15	26	Qualified to Second phase
4	Vitória	19	8	9	2	26	15	+11	25	Qualified to Second phase
5	Internacional	19	9	6	4	30	19	+11	24	Qualified to Second phase
6	Atlético Paranaense	19	9	4	6	24	17	+7	22	Qualified to Second phase
7	Vasco da Gama	19	7	8	4	19	13	+6	22	Qualified to Second phase
8	Bahia	19	7	8	4	15	14	+1	22	Qualified to Second phase
9	Coritiba	19	8	5	6	24	21	+3	21	Qualified to Second phase
10	Paysandu	19	6	8	5	16	16	0	20	Qualified to Second phase
11	Tiradentes	19	7	5	7	19	20	−1	19	
12	Remo	19	5	6	8	22	27	−5	16	
13	Olaria	19	5	6	8	17	22	−5	16	
14	América de Natal	19	5	5	9	12	23	−11	15	
15	Botafogo	19	4	7	8	26	29	−3	15	
16	Fluminense	19	3	9	7	16	22	−6	15	Qualified to Second phase according to average revenue criteria
17	Desportiva	19	4	6	9	11	27	−16	14	
18	Sampaio Corrêa	19	4	4	11	14	26	−12	12	
19	Itabaiana	19	5	0	14	11	30	−19	10	
20	Avaí	19	2	3	14	11	30	−19	7	

=== Group B ===
Pos	Team	Pld	W	D	L	GF	GA	GD	Pts	Qualification
1	Atlético Mineiro	19	11	4	4	33	20	+13	26	Qualified to Second phase
2	Cruzeiro	19	8	8	3	18	9	+9	24	Qualified to Second phase
3	Guarani	19	8	8	3	21	15	+6	24	Qualified to Second phase
4	São Paulo	19	7	10	2	22	12	+10	24	Qualified to Second phase
5	Santos	19	8	7	4	29	17	+12	23	Qualified to Second phase
6	Náutico	19	8	6	5	22	12	+10	22	Qualified to Second phase
7	Operário de Campo Grande	19	8	6	5	15	14	+1	22	Qualified to Second phase
8	Corinthians	19	7	8	4	26	16	+10	22	Qualified to Second phase
9	Portuguesa	19	5	11	3	19	16	+3	21	Qualified to Second phase
10	Fortaleza	19	8	4	7	21	19	+2	20	Qualified to Second phase
11	Goiás	19	7	6	6	21	18	+3	20	Qualified to Second phase as best non-top 10 teams in both groups
12	Palmeiras	19	6	8	5	22	20	+2	20	Qualified to Second phase as best non-top 10 teams in both groups
13	Rio Negro	19	6	7	6	17	23	−6	19	
14	Sport	19	4	10	5	20	22	−2	18	
15	América Mineiro	19	5	6	8	19	25	−6	16	
16	Ceará	19	4	8	7	19	23	−4	16	
17	Nacional	19	5	4	10	14	27	−13	14	Qualified to Second phase due to average revenue criteria
18	Santa Cruz	19	2	9	8	17	27	−10	13	
19	CEUB	19	3	6	10	12	23	−11	12	
20	CSA	19	1	2	16	6	35	−29	4	

== Second phase ==
=== Group 1 ===
Pos	Team	Pld	W	D	L	GF	GA	GD	Pts
1	(Minas Gerais) Cruzeiro	5	5	0	0	11	3	+8	10
2	(São Paulo (state)) Palmeiras	5	4	0	1	10	5	+5	8
3	(Guanabara (state)) Flamengo	5	2	1	2	12	7	+5	5
4	(São Paulo (state)) Guarani	5	2	0	3	5	7	−2	4
5	Bahia	5	0	2	3	3	8	−5	2
6	(Pará) Paysandu	5	0	1	4	3	14	−11	1

=== Group 2 ===
Pos	Team	Pld	W	D	L	GF	GA	GD	Pts
1	(Guanabara (state)) Vasco da Gama	5	3	2	0	7	0	+7	8
2	(Bahia) Vitória	5	2	2	1	5	3	+2	6
3	(Minas Gerais) Atlético Mineiro	5	2	1	2	8	6	+2	5
4	(São Paulo (state)) Corinthians	5	1	2	2	3	5	−2	4
5	(Amazonas (Brazilian state)) Nacional-AM	5	1	2	2	3	6	−3	4
6	(Mato Grosso) Operário de Campo Grande	5	1	1	3	2	8	−6	3

=== Group 3 ===
Pos	Team	Pld	W	D	L	GF	GA	GD	Pts
1	(São Paulo (state)) Santos	5	4	1	0	8	2	+6	9
2	(Rio Grande do Sul) Grêmio	5	4	0	1	7	3	+4	8
3	(Ceará) Fortaleza	5	1	3	1	5	4	+1	5
4	(Pernambuco) Náutico	5	1	2	2	7	8	−1	4
5	(Paraná (state)) Coritiba	5	1	1	3	5	7	−2	3
6	(Guanabara (state)) América-RJ	5	0	1	4	2	10	−8	1

=== Group 4 ===
Pos	Team	Pld	W	D	L	GF	GA	GD	Pts
1	(Rio Grande do Sul) Internacional	5	3	2	0	6	2	+4	8
2	(Paraná (state)) Atlético Paranaense	5	2	3	0	5	3	+2	7
3	(São Paulo (state)) São Paulo	5	1	3	1	3	3	0	5
4	(São Paulo (state)) Portuguesa	5	1	2	2	4	6	−2	4
5	(Guanabara (state)) Fluminense	5	1	1	3	4	6	−2	3
6	Goiás	5	0	3	2	4	6	−2	3

== Third phase ==
Pos	Team	Pld	W	D	L	GF	GA	GD	Pts
1	(Minas Gerais) Cruzeiro	3	1	2	0	5	3	+2	4
2	(Guanabara (state)) Vasco da Gama	3	1	2	0	5	4	+1	4
3	(São Paulo (state)) Santos	3	1	0	2	4	6	−2	2
4	(Rio Grande do Sul) Internacional	3	0	2	1	4	5	−1	2

== Finals ==
1 August 1974

Vasco da Gama (Guanabara (state))	2 – 1	(Minas Gerais) Cruzeiro
Ademir 14'; Jorginho Carvoeiro 78'		Nelinho 19'

Maracanã, Rio de Janeiro (GB)
Attendance: 112,933
Referee: (São Paulo (state)) Armando Marques

== Final standings ==
Pos	Team	Pld	W	D	L	GF	GA	GD	Pts
1	Vasco da Gama	28	12	12	4	33	18	+15	36
2	Cruzeiro	28	14	10	4	35	17	+18	38
3	Santos	27	13	8	6	41	25	+16	34
4	Internacional	27	12	10	5	40	26	+14	34
5	Grêmio	24	18	2	4	37	11	+26	38
6	Flamengo	24	14	6	4	41	15	+26	34
7	Atlético Mineiro	24	13	5	6	41	26	+15	31
8	Vitória	24	10	11	3	31	18	+13	31
9	Atlético Paranaense	24	11	7	6	29	20	+9	29
10	São Paulo	24	8	13	3	25	15	+10	29
11	Palmeiras	24	10	8	6	32	25	+7	28
12	Guarani	24	10	8	6	26	22	+4	28
13	América-RJ	24	12	3	9	32	25	+7	27
14	Náutico	24	9	8	7	29	20	+9	26
15	Corinthians	24	8	10	6	29	21	+8	26
16	Fortaleza	24	9	7	8	26	23	+3	25
17	Operário (CG)	24	9	7	8	17	22	−5	25
18	Portuguesa	24	6	13	5	23	22	+1	25
19	Coritiba	24	9	6	9	29	28	+1	24
20	Bahia	24	7	10	7	18	22	−4	24
21	Goiás	24	7	9	8	25	24	+1	23
22	Paysandu	24	6	9	9	19	30	−11	21
23	Nacional-AM	24	6	6	12	17	33	−16	18
24	Fluminense	24	4	10	10	20	28	−8	18
25	Tiradentes	19	7	5	7	19	20	−1	19
26	Rio Negro	19	6	7	6	17	23	−6	19
27	Sport	19	4	10	5	20	22	−2	18
28	Remo	19	5	6	8	22	27	−5	16
29	Olaria	19	5	6	8	17	22	−5	16
30	América Mineiro	19	5	6	8	19	25	−6	16
31	Ceará	19	4	8	7	19	23	−4	16
32	América de Natal	19	5	5	9	12	23	−11	15
33	Botafogo	19	4	7	8	26	29	−3	15
34	Desportiva Capixaba	19	4	6	9	11	27	−16	14
35	Santa Cruz	19	2	9	8	17	27	−10	13
36	Sampaio Corrêa	19	4	4	11	14	26	−12	12
37	CEUB	19	3	6	10	12	23	−11	12
38	Itabaiana	19	5	0	14	11	30	−19	10
39	Avaí	19	2	3	14	11	30	−19	7
40	CSA	19	1	2	16	6	35	−29	4

Source: rsssf.com
