= 1970 Copa Ganadores de Copa =

Tournament details
- Dates: March 8 – April 26, 1970
- Teams: 8

Final positions
- Champions: (Bolivia) Mariscal Santa Cruz (1st title)
- Runners-up: (Ecuador) El Nacional

Tournament statistics
- Matches played: 15
- Goals scored: 38 (2.53 per match)
- Top scorer: Eliseo Báez (5 goals)

The 1970 Copa Ganadores de Copa was the first and only edition of CONMEBOL's club tournament. Teams that failed to qualify for the Copa Libertadores played in this tournament. Eight teams from eight South American football confederations played in this tournament. Colombia and Brazil sent no representatives. Mariscal Santa Cruz defeated El Nacional in the finals.

== Qualified teams ==
Country	Team	Qualification method
Argentina (1 berth)	Atlanta	1969 Copa Argentina runner-up
Bolivia (1 berth)	Mariscal Santa Cruz	1969 Primera División third place
Chile (1 berth)	Unión Española	1969 Pre-Recopa Sudamericana winner
Ecuador (1 berth)	El Nacional	1970 Copa Ecuador champion
Paraguay (1 berth)	Libertad	1969 Primera División third place
Peru (1 berth)	Deportivo Municipal	1969 Primera División third place
Uruguay (1 berth)	Rampla Juniors	1969 Copa Alfredo Lois champion
Venezuela (1 berth)	Unión Deportiva Canarias	1969 Copa Venezuela runner-up

== Group stage ==
=== Group 1 ===
Pos	Team	Pld	W	D	L	GF	GA	GD	Pts	Qualification
1	(Ecuador) El Nacional	2	1	1	0	4	1	+3	3	Advance to Finals
2	(Venezuela) Unión Deportiva Canarias	2	0	2	0	0	0	0	2	
3	(Paraguay) Libertad	2	0	1	1	1	4	−3	1	

==== Results ====
8 March 1970	El Nacional (Ecuador)	0–0	(Venezuela) Unión Deportiva Canarias	Estadio Olímpico Atahualpa, Quito

11 March 1970	Unión Deportiva Canarias (Venezuela)	0–0	(Paraguay) Libertad	Estadio Olímpico Atahualpa, Quito

15 March 1970	El Nacional (Ecuador)	4–1	(Paraguay) Libertad	Estadio Olímpico Atahualpa, Quito

=== Group 2 ===
Pos	Team	Pld	W	D	L	GF	GA	GD	Pts	Qualification
1	(Bolivia) Mariscal Santa Cruz	4	3	1	0	8	3	+5	7	Advance to Finals
2	(Argentina) Atlanta	4	2	1	1	9	7	+2	5	
3	(Chile) Unión Española	4	1	2	1	6	6	0	4	
4	(Peru) Deportivo Municipal	4	0	3	1	6	7	−1	3	
5	(Uruguay) Rampla Juniors	4	0	1	3	2	8	−6	1	

==== Results ====
===== Round 1 =====
22 March 1970	Mariscal Santa Cruz (Bolivia)	1–0	(Argentina) Atlanta	Estadio Hernando Siles, La Paz

22 March 1970	Unión Española (Chile)	1–1	(Peru) Deportivo Municipal	Estadio Hernando Siles, La Paz

===== Round 2 =====
26 March 1970	Unión Española (Chile)	1–0	(Uruguay) Rampla Juniors	Estadio Hernando Siles, La Paz

26 March 1970	Atlanta (Argentina)	4–3	(Peru) Deportivo Municipal	Estadio Hernando Siles, La Paz

===== Round 3 =====
28 March 1970	Atlanta (Argentina)	3–3	(Chile) Unión Española	Estadio Hernando Siles, La Paz

29 March 1970	Mariscal Santa Cruz (Bolivia)	4–1	(Uruguay) Rampla Juniors	Estadio Hernando Siles, La Paz

===== Round 4 =====
2 April 1970	Mariscal Santa Cruz (Bolivia)	2–1	(Chile) Unión Española	Estadio Hernando Siles, La Paz

2 April 1970	Deportivo Municipal (Peru)	1–1	(Uruguay) Rampla Juniors	Estadio Félix Capriles, Cochabamba

===== Round 5 =====
4 April 1970	Rampla Juniors (Uruguay)	0–2	(Argentina) Atlanta	Estadio Félix Capriles, Cochabamba

5 April 1970	Mariscal Santa Cruz (Bolivia)	1–1	(Peru) Deportivo Municipal	Estadio Hernando Siles, La Paz

== Finals ==
=== First leg ===
19 April 1970	El Nacional (Ecuador)	0–0	(Bolivia) Mariscal Santa Cruz	Estadio Olímpico Atahualpa, Quito

=== Second leg ===
26 April 1970	Mariscal Santa Cruz (Bolivia)	2–0	(Ecuador) El Nacional	Estadio Hernando Siles, La Paz

== Top scorer ==
Player	Club	Goals
(Paraguay) Eliseo Báez	(Bolivia) Mariscal Santa Cruz	5
