= 1973 Campeonato Nacional Primera División =

Campeonato Nacional 1973
- Dates: 15 April 1973 – 23 February 1974
- Champions: Unión Española (3rd title)
- Relegated: Universidad Católica
- 1974 Copa Libertadores: Unión Española; Colo-Colo
- Matches: 306
- Goals: 857 (2.8 per match)
- Top goalscorer: Guillermo Yávar (21 goals)
- Biggest home win: Unión Española 6–0 Antofagasta Portuario (17 February 1974)
- Highest attendance: 63,185 Colo-Colo 3–2 Palestino (24 June)
- Total attendance: 2,031,819
- Average attendance: 6,750

The 1973 Campeonato Nacional was Chilean first tier's 41st season. Unión Española was the tournament's champion.

== Standings ==
Pos	Team	Pld	W	D	L	GF	GA	GD	Pts	Qualification or relegation
1	Unión Española	34	22	11	1	72	35	+37	55	Champions & Qualified to the 1974 Copa Libertadores
2	Colo-Colo	34	18	11	5	63	43	+20	47	Qualified to the 1974 Copa Libertadores
3	Huachipato	34	17	9	8	52	28	+24	43	
4	O'Higgins	34	14	15	5	50	33	+17	43	
5	Deportes Concepción	34	14	9	11	49	35	+14	37	
6	Magallanes	34	12	13	9	51	44	+7	37	
7	Green Cross Temuco	34	15	7	12	47	45	+2	37	
8	Deportes La Serena	34	13	10	11	43	33	+10	36	
9	Antofagasta Portuario	34	12	10	12	47	46	+1	34	
10	Unión La Calera	34	14	6	14	38	46	−8	34	
11	Rangers	34	11	7	16	51	57	−6	29	
12	Santiago Wanderers	34	10	9	15	50	61	−11	29	
13	Universidad de Chile	34	10	8	16	54	64	−10	28	
14	Lota Schwager	34	8	11	15	34	41	−7	27	
15	Palestino	34	8	10	16	37	58	−21	26	
16	Naval	34	7	11	16	30	53	−23	25	
17	Unión San Felipe	34	10	4	20	45	72	−27	24	
18	Universidad Católica	34	5	11	18	43	62	−19	21	Relegated to 1974 Segunda División

Campeonato Nacional
1973 champions
Unión Española
3rd title

== Scores ==
Home \ Away	ANT	COL	DCO	GCT	HUA	LSE	LOT	MAG	NAV	OHI	PAL	RAN	SFE	LCA	UCA	UCH	UES	SWA
Antofagasta		0–1	1–1	1–0	0–1	2–1	0–0	2–0	2–0	2–2	1–1	0–0	3–1	1–0	2–1	3–1	1–1	0–2
Colo-Colo	4–3		2–1	2–1	1–3	2–1	5–3	2–2	2–1	2–0	3–2	3–1	6–2	4–0	3–2	0–2	0–0	3–3
Concepción	1–1	0–0		5–1	0–1	2–1	2–1	0–2	2–0	0–0	1–1	0–1	3–0	2–2	3–1	2–1	1–2	2–2
Green Cross T.	1–0	1–1	2–1		3–2	1–0	2–2	2–1	2–0	0–1	3–0	2–0	1–0	0–1	0–0	0–0	2–2	2–1
Huachipato	0–1	0–0	0–0	3–0		1–2	0–0	4–0	2–2	1–1	2–0	1–1	1–1	2–0	2–1	3–0	2–1	1–2
La Serena	1–0	1–1	1–1	1–2	2–3		3–1	0–0	2–0	1–1	3–1	2–1	3–0	0–1	1–1	3–0	0–1	1–0
Lota S.	0–0	1–1	1–0	3–2	1–2	2–0		0–0	3–1	0–0	0–1	0–1	3–0	0–0	2–0	4–1	0–3	1–0
Magallanes	2–1	2–3	0–2	2–1	1–1	0–0	3–1		3–0	0–1	3–1	3–2	0–1	3–0	3–0	5–4	0–0	3–1
Naval	1–2	0–0	0–1	2–0	0–2	2–1	1–0	2–2		2–1	0–0	0–0	1–0	0–1	1–1	2–1	1–2	3–3
O'Higgins	1–1	0–2	0–1	2–0	1–0	2–2	2–0	3–3	1–1		2–0	3–2	3–0	4–2	1–0	4–1	0–0	2–1
Palestino	1–4	1–1	1–3	1–1	0–3	1–2	1–0	0–0	1–1	1–2		1–1	3–2	2–1	4–3	2–1	2–2	1–2
Rangers	4–2	2–4	0–2	1–3	1–1	0–0	3–2	2–0	4–1	2–1	1–0		3–4	4–0	1–2	3–0	0–2	2–3
San Felipe	0–3	1–2	1–0	1–2	0–3	0–2	0–0	1–2	4–0	2–5	3–2	5–2		2–1	0–0	1–0	1–4	6–2
La Calera	2–1	3–1	0–2	2–1	1–0	1–2	1–0	2–1	0–0	0–0	2–1	1–1	1–0		2–0	2–3	0–0	1–0
Universidad Católica	3–3	0–1	2–5	2–2	0–1	1–1	2–0	1–1	0–2	2–2	0–1 (Note: Game was awarded to Palestino as a 0-1 win by Walkover.)	3–1	1–2	2–1		3–3	1–2	2–4
U. de Chile	3–1	0–0	2–0	0–2	1–2	0–2	1–1	1–1	5–2	1–1	4–2	4–1	2–1	3–2	2–2		3–3	2–3
U. Española	6–0	2–0	2–1	4–3	2–1	1–0	2–1	2–2	1–0	1–1	1–1	2–1	8–3	2–0	4–3	1–0		4–3
S. Wanderers	3–2	2–1	3–2	1–2	2–1	1–1	1–1	1–1	1–1	0–0	0–1	0–2	0–0	2–5	0–1	0–2	1–2	

Legend: Blue = home team win; Yellow = draw; Red = away team win.

== Top goalscorers ==
Rank	Name	Club	Goals
1	(Chile) Guillermo Yávar	Unión Española	21
2	(Chile) Manuel García	Rangers	18
3	(Chile) Juan Carlos Orellana	Green Cross Temuco	18
4	(Chile) Jorge Socías	Universidad de Chile	18
5	(Chile) Alejandro Trujillo	Unión Española	16
