= Juan Alfredo Farías =

Bolivian footballer (born 1945)

Personal information
- Date of birth: 8 May 1945 (age 81)
- Position: Defender

International career
Years	Team	Apps	(Gls)
1975	Bolivia	2	(0)

Juan Alfredo Farías (born 8 May 1945) is a Bolivian footballer. He played in two matches for the Bolivia national football team in 1975. He was also part of Bolivia's squad for the 1975 Copa América tournament.
