= Juan Machuca =

Chilean footballer (born 1951)

Personal information
- Full name: Juan de Dios Machuca Valdés
- Date of birth: 7 March 1951 (age 75)
- Place of birth: Santiago, Chile
- Position: Defender

Youth career
- Unión Española

Senior career*
Years	Team	Apps	(Gls)
1969–1987	Unión Española	375	(5)
Total		375	(5)

International career
1972–1977	Chile	22	(0)

Managerial career
- 1997–1998: Deportes Polpaico
- 2009–2011: Lautaro de Buin
- * Club domestic league appearances and goals

Juan de Dios Machuca Valdés (born 7 March 1951) is a Chilean football defender who played for Chile in the 1974 FIFA World Cup.

== Career ==
Machuca played all his career for Unión Española, winning the Chilean Primera División titles in 1973, 1975 and 1977. With them, he reached the final match in the 1975 Copa Libertadores.

At international level, he made 35 appearances in total for the Chile national team, earning 22 caps in official matches from 1972 to 1977. He was a member of the Chile squad in the 1974 FIFA World Cup.

As a coach, he led Deportes Polpaico in the 1997 Cuarta División, winning the league title. He also coached women's football teams, Lautaro de Buin, among others.

== In politics ==
In 2016, Machuca was a candidate to councillor for Independencia commune as a member of Independent Democratic Union.
