= Carlos Vega (footballer) =

Chilean footballer

Personal information
- Full name: Carlos Rafael Vega Mena
- Date of birth: 12 April 1973 (age 53)
- Place of birth: Chile
- Height: 1.77 m (5 ft 10 in)
- Position: Forward

Senior career*
Years	Team	Apps	(Gls)
1992-1995	Magallanes		
1994	→ Municipal Talagante (loan)		
1996	FC Gossau	8	(4)
1996	Real Zacatecas	20	(12)
1997	Colo-Colo	0	(0)
1997	→ Deportes Puerto Montt (loan)	3	(1)
1997	→ Ñublense (loan)	12	(2)
1998	Deportes Tolima		
1999	O'Higgins	2	(1)
2001	Persema Malang		
2001	Malang United		
2004	Sorrento		

Managerial career
- Sorrento
- Chile Nuevo
- Ellenbrook United
- Perth Saints
- 2019–2020: Northern Redbacks (youth)
- 2020–2021: Northern Redbacks
- 2021–: Perth RedStar
- * Club domestic league appearances and goals

Carlos Rafael Vega Mena is a Chilean football manager and former footballer who played as a forward for clubs in Chile and abroad.

== Club career ==
Vega played football for thirteen years for clubs in his homeland, Switzerland, Mexico, Colombia, Indonesia and Australia.

After his stints in Switzerland, Magallanes, with whom he won the league title of the Chilean Tercera División in 1995 scoring two goals in the final match, and the Mexican side Real Zacatecas, he joined Colo-Colo in 1997. After having no chances to play in the league, he was loaned to Deportes Puerto Montt.

The next season, he played for Colombian side Deportes Tolima and returned to Chile in 1999 to play for O'Higgins, coinciding again with Sergio Villegas, with whom had played in Colo-Colo and Deportes Puerto Montt.

In 2001, he moved abroad again and played for Indonesian side Persema Malang, later Malang United, where he coincided with his compatriot Jimmy Rojas.

His last club was Sorrento FC in the National Premier Leagues Western Australia in 2004.

== Coaching career ==
In 2003, he attended INAF (National Football Institute) in his homeland and graduated as a football manager, starting to coach in 2004 when he came to Australia.

Coaching both male and female Juniors and Seniors, he has worked for Sorrento FC, Chile Nuevo, Ellenbrook United and Perth Saints before coaching Northern Redbacks at both youth and senior level from 2019 to 2021.

In 2021, he joined Perth RedStar.

== Personal life ==
In Australia, he also worked as an individual trader until 2019.

His daughter, Natalia, has played football for both Perth Saints Boys U13 and Northern Redbacks U16.

== Honours ==
Magallanes

- Tercera División de Chile (1): 1995
