= Apolinar Paniagua =

Paraguayan footballer (born 1946)

Personal information
- Date of birth: 23 July 1946 (age 80)
- Place of birth: Yaguarón, Paraguay
- Position: Forward

Senior career*
Years	Team	Apps	(Gls)
1966–1967	Antofagasta Portuario		
1968–1969	Olimpia		
1970	Guaraní	12	(3)
1971	Deportivo Pereira	45	(30)
1972–1973	Millonarios	71	(41)
1974–1975	Olimpia		
1976–1977	Libertad		
1977–1978	Tampico Madero		
1979–1980	Manta Sport		

International career
1975–1977	Paraguay	18	(1)
- * Club domestic league appearances and goals

Apolinar Paniagua (born 23 July 1946) is a Paraguayan former footballer who played as a forward.

== Career ==
Born in Yaguarón, Paraguay, Paniagua played in Chile, Colombia, Mexico and Ecuador in addition to his homeland.

In Chile, he played for Antofagasta Portuario.

In Colombia, he played for Deportivo Pereira and Millonarios.

In Mexico, he played for Tampico Madero.

In Ecuador, he played for Manta Sport, the previous club to Manta FC, his last club.

At international level, Paniagua played in 18 matches for the Paraguay national football team from 1975 to 1977. He was also part of Paraguay's squad for the 1975 Copa América tournament.
