= Alejandro Trujillo =

Chilean footballer (1952–2020)

Personal information
- Full name: Alejandro Magno Trujillo Obreke
- Date of birth: 26 March 1952
- Place of birth: Estación Central, Santiago, Chile
- Date of death: 6 January 2020 (aged 67)
- Place of death: Santiago, Chile
- Height: 1.67 m (5 ft 6 in)
- Positions: Forward; midfielder

Youth career
- Universidad Católica
- Unión Española

Senior career*
Years	Team	Apps	(Gls)
1970–1972	Unión Española	42	(7)
1973–1974	O'Higgins	61	(30)
1975–1976	Unión Española	36	(13)
1977–1978	Audax Italiano	32	(3)
1979–1983	San Antonio Unido		

International career^{‡}
1972–1974	Chile	3	(0)
- * Club domestic league appearances and goals as of 29 July 2021 ‡ National team caps and goals as of 29 July 2021

Alejandro Magno Trujillo Obreke (26 March 1952 – 6 January 2020) was a Chilean professional footballer who played mainly as a forward for Unión Española, O'Higgins and Audax Italiano during the 1970s. He also earned three caps for the Chile national team. In 1999, he was voted to the O'Higgins Team of the Century by fans of the club.

Nicknamed El Turco ("The Turk") for his appearance, he died on 6 January 2020 at the age of 67.

== Early years ==
Trujillo grew up playing street football in the barrios of Estación Central. He eventually joined the youth ranks of Universidad Católica, spending a short time with them before joining the Unión Española academy when he moved to Conchalí with his family.

== Club career ==
Trujillo made his professional debut with Unión Española in 1970, at the age of 17. After disagreements with head coach Néstor Isella over his maturity that resulted in his benching, he made the move to O'Higgins in 1973, where he made an immediate impact. In his first season with the team, he scored 16 goals, finishing as the league's fifth-leading goalscorer as O'Higgins finished in fourth place. He scored 14 league goals the following year (and 24 across all competitions), cementing himself as one of the country's most talented young forwards.

He then returned to Unión Española in 1975, winning the league title that year. They also finished as runner-ups in the 1975 Copa Libertadores. He scored seven goals in the tournament, including the game-tying goal against Universitario in the second round that sent his team to the finals, where they lost to Argentine champs Independiente.

== International career ==
He made his international debut during a 2–0 friendly loss to Mexico in Santiago on 16 August 1972. He made two further appearances for Chile during the 1974 Copa Carlos Dittbor, the name given to the home-and-away series between Chile and Argentina that was played in the 1960s and 1970s.

== Honours ==
=== Club ===
Unión Española

- Chilean Primera División: 1975

=== Individual ===
- O'Higgins Team of the Century: 1999
