= Aurelio Pascuttini =

Argentine footballer and manager

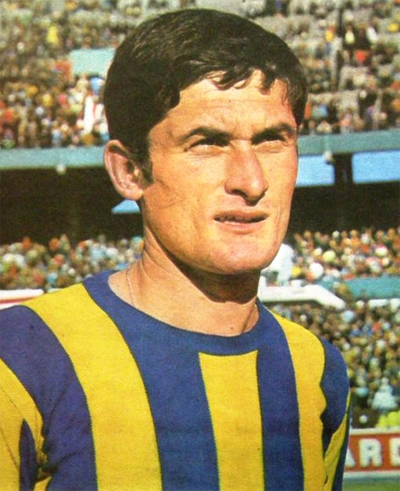

Personal information
- Full name: Aurelio José Pascuttini
- Date of birth: 19 March 1944 (age 82)
- Place of birth: Rosario, Argentina
- Position: Defender

Senior career*
Years	Team	Apps	(Gls)
1966–1976	CA Rosario Central	341	(29)
1977–1982	América de Cali	206	(31)
Total		547	(60)

International career
1968–1969	Argentina	3	(0)

Managerial career
- 1984: CA Rosario Central
- 1995: Deportivo Toluca
- * Club domestic league appearances and goals

Aurelio José Pascuttini (born March 19, 1944, in Rosario) is an Argentinian former football defender. He played for two clubs in career: his hometown's CA Rosario Central (1956–76) and América de Cali of Colombia (1977–82). He helped both clubs win championships.
