= Miguel Ángel Pecoraro =

Argentine footballer

Personal information
- Full name: Miguel Ángel Pecoraro
- Date of birth: 29 August 1948 (age 78)
- Place of birth: Rosario, Argentina
- Height: 1.77 m (5 ft 10 in)
- Position: Defender

Senior career*
Years	Team	Apps	(Gls)
1966	Central Córdoba		
1967–1968	Belgrano		
1969–1974	Atlanta	132	(17)
1975–1976	Palestino	60	(1)
1977	Santiago Morning	38	(1)
1978–1980	Audax Italiano	36	(4)
1981	Rangers		
1982	Ñublense	–	(–)

Managerial career
- 2000: San Antonio Unido
- * Club domestic league appearances and goals

Miguel Ángel Pecoraro (born in Buenos Aires, Argentina) is a former Argentine footballer who played for clubs in Argentina and Chile.

During his years in Argentina, he scored fourteen goals from penalty kicks which is the second best result for an Atlanta professional footballer.

== Teams ==
- (Argentina) Central Córdoba de Rosario 1966
- (Argentina) Belgrano 1967–1968
- (Argentina) Atlanta 1969–1974
- (Chile) Palestino 1975–1976
- (Chile) Santiago Morning 1977
- (Chile) Audax Italiano 1978–1980
- (Chile) Rangers 1981
- (Chile) Ñublense 1982

== Personal life ==
Pecoraro naturalized Chilean by residence in 1980.
