= Eddio Inostroza =

Chilean footballer and manager (born 1946)

Personal information
- Full name: Eddio Victorino Inostroza Ibacache
- Date of birth: 3 September 1946 (age 80)
- Place of birth: Chiguayante, Chile
- Height: 1.78 m (5 ft 10 in)
- Position: Midfielder

Senior career*
| Years | Team | Apps | (Gls) |
| 1969–1974 | Huachipato | 107 | (8) |
| 1974–1975 | Unión Española | 68 | (4) |
| 1977–1983 | Colo-Colo | 98 | (5) |
| 1984 | Deportes Temuco | 32 | (3) |

International career^{‡}
| 1974–1980 | Chile | 13 | (0) |

Managerial career
- 1992: La Serena
- 1994: Colo-Colo
- 1998: ESPOLI
- 1998-1999: San Luis de Quillota
- * Club domestic league appearances and goals ‡ National team caps and goals as of 28 August 2015

Eddio Victorino Inostroza Ibacache (born 3 September 1946) is a Chilean former footballer and manager.

He worked as Colo-Colo assistant coach between 1986 and 1991 being present in the charge during 1991 Copa Libertadores title obtention with Mirko Jozić in the bench. Un 1994, he served as caretaker coach after Vicente Cantatore demission, having a prior experience at Deportes La Serena two years ago.

== Honours ==
=== Club ===
Huachipato

- Primera División de Chile: 1974

Unión Española

- Primera División de Chile: 1975

Colo-Colo

- Primera División de Chile (3): 1979, 1981, 1982
- Copa Chile (2): 1981, 1982
