= Roberto Cabral =

Argentine footballer (born 1952)

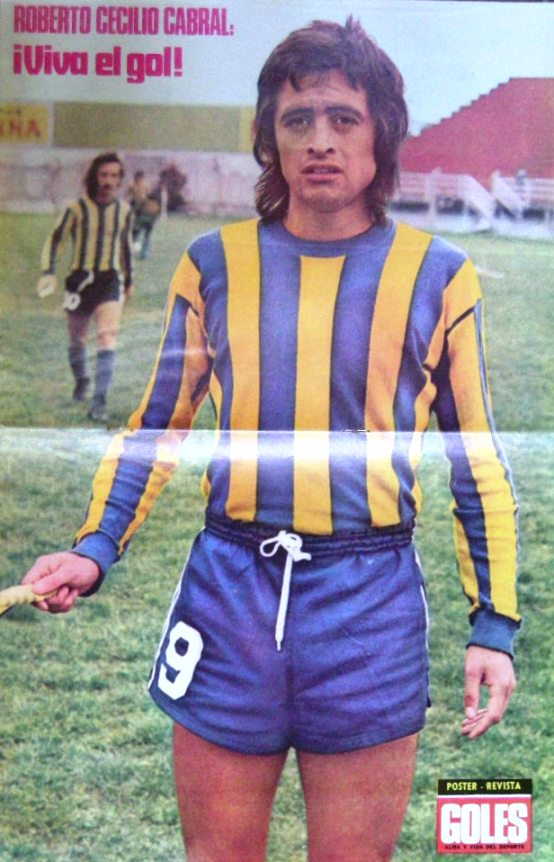

Personal information
- Full name: Roberto Raúl Cecilio Cabral
- Date of birth: June 18, 1952 (age 74)
- Place of birth: Córdoba, Argentina
- Position: Striker

Senior career*
Years	Team	Apps	(Gls)
1970–1971	Platense	118	(39)
1972–1975	Huracán	25	(6)
1973–1975	Rosario Central	99	(41)
1975–1978	Beerschot	80	(22)
1978–1981	Lille	98	(28)
1981–1982	Independiente	4	(0)
1982–1983	Platense		
1984–1988	Clermont Foot	3	(1)
- * Club domestic league appearances and goals

Roberto Cabral (born 18 June 1952 in Córdoba, Argentina) is an Argentine former football striker.
