= Juan Carlos Orellana =

Chilean footballer (1955–2022)

Personal information
- Full name: Juan Carlos Orellana Jara
- Date of birth: 21 June 1955
- Place of birth: Barrancas, Santiago, Chile
- Date of death: 10 November 2022 (aged 67)
- Place of death: Santiago, Chile
- Position: Winger

Senior career*
Years	Team	Apps	(Gls)
1973–1974	Green Cross-Temuco		
1974–1980	Colo-Colo		
1981–1983	O'Higgins		
1984	Unión Española		
1985	Deportes Antofagasta		
1986	Deportes Temuco		
1987	Unión San Felipe		
1987	Chile Lindo		

International career
1977–1983	Chile	11	(4)
- * Club domestic league appearances and goals

Juan Carlos Orellana Jara (21 June 1955 – 10 November 2022) was a Chilean footballer who played as a left winger.

== Career ==
Orellana made his professional debut with Green Cross-Temuco in 1973, aged 17, scoring a goal. The next year, he switched to Colo-Colo. He played over 200 games for Colo-Colo.

In 1987, he played abroad in Canada's National Soccer League with Chile Lindo.

== Personal life and death ==
Orellana was nicknamed El Zurdo de Barrancas (The Lefty from Barrancas), due to the fact that he played with his left foot and came from Barrancas, currently Pudahuel.

Orellana suffered amyotrophic lateral sclerosis and died on 10 November 2022, at the age of 67.

== Honours ==
Colo-Colo

- Chilean Primera División 1979
