= Jorge Spedaletti =

Argentine-born Chilean footballer (1947–2022)

Personal information
- Full name: Américo Jorge Ramón Spedaletti González
- Date of birth: 24 September 1947
- Place of birth: Rosario, Argentina
- Date of death: 10 June 2022 (aged 74)
- Place of death: Santiago, Chile
- Height: 1.85 m (6 ft 1 in)
- Position: Forward

Youth career
- Rosario Morning Star
- Newell's Old Boys
- Gimnasia LP

Senior career*
Years	Team	Apps	(Gls)
1965–1968	Gimnasia LP		
1968	Godoy Cruz		
1969–1973	Universidad de Chile		
1974–1975	Unión Española		
1976–1977	Everton		
1978	Universidad de Chile		
1979	Everton		
1980	Deportes Concepción		
1981	Everton		
1982	Deportes Antofagasta		

International career
1975–1977	Chile	5	(0)

Managerial career
- 1990: Deportes Concepción (assistant)
- 1991: Cobreloa (assistant)
- 1992: Palestino (assistant)
- 1993–1998: Unión Española (youth)
- 1996: Unión Española (caretaker)
- 2001: Cristo Salva
- * Club domestic league appearances and goals

Américo Jorge Ramón Spedaletti González (24 September 1947 – 10 June 2022) was a professional football player and manager who played as a forward. Born in Argentina, he played for various clubs in both Argentina and Chile and represented the Chile national team.

== International career ==
Born in Argentina, he became a naturalized Chilean in 1974 and represented Chile national team from 1975 to 1977, making five appearances.

== Personal life ==
After his retirement as a professional footballer, he returned to Argentina and worked as a taxi driver until the end of the 1980s.

On 6 October 2002, he suffered a serious TBI after falling from the third floor of the building where he lived due to forgetting his keys. Unión Española and Universidad de Chile collected money for his recovery by playing a match. He left the hospital on November of the same year.

He died due to multiple health issues on 10 June 2022.

== Honours ==
Gimnasia LP

- Torneo Promocional: 1967

Godoy Cruz

- Liga Mendocina de Fútbol: 1968

Universidad de Chile

- Chilean Primera División: 1969
- Torneo Metropolitano de Chile: 1969
- Copa Francisco Candelori: 1969

Unión Española

- Chilean Primera División: 1975

Everton

- Chilean Primera División: 1976
