= 1969 Campeonato Nacional Primera División =

Campeonato Profesional de Fútbol
- Dates: 8 March 1969 – 10 January 1970
- Champions: Universidad de Chile (7th title)
- Relegated: Santiago Morning
- 1970 Copa Libertadores: Universidad de Chile; Rangers
- 1970 Copa Ganadores de Copa: Unión Española (Play-off winners)
- Matches: 325
- Goals: 990 (3.05 per match)
- Top goalscorer: Eladio Zárate (22 goals)
- Biggest home win: Green Cross Temuco 8–0 Santiago Morning (12 October 1969)
- Highest attendance: 72,803 Colo-Colo 2–2 Universidad de Chile (27 December 1969)
- Total attendance: 3,694,866
- Average attendance: 11,368

The 1969 Campeonato Nacional de Futbol Profesional was Chilean first tier’s 37th season. Universidad de Chile were the champions, winning its seventh title.

== First stage ==
=== Torneo Metropolitano ===
| Pos | Team | Pld | W | D | L | GF | GA | GD | Pts | Qualification |
|---|---|---|---|---|---|---|---|---|---|---|
| 1 | Universidad de Chile | 14 | 9 | 5 | 0 | 34 | 16 | +18 | 23 | Qualified to Torneo Nacional with bonus points (Note: Top 5 teams earned bonus points for the Torneo Nacional: Universidad de Chile 5pts, Unión Española 4pts, Palestino 3pts, Colo-Colo 2pts, Audax Italiano 1pt.) |
| 2 | Unión Española | 14 | 6 | 3 | 5 | 28 | 26 | +2 | 15 | Qualified to Torneo Nacional with bonus points |
| 3 | Palestino | 14 | 5 | 4 | 5 | 20 | 16 | +4 | 14 | Qualified to Torneo Nacional with bonus points |
| 4 | Colo-Colo | 14 | 6 | 2 | 6 | 36 | 35 | +1 | 14 | Qualified to Torneo Nacional with bonus points |
| 5 | Audax Italiano | 14 | 5 | 3 | 6 | 32 | 36 | −4 | 13 | Qualified to Torneo Nacional with bonus points |
| 6 | Universidad Católica | 14 | 6 | 1 | 7 | 32 | 36 | −4 | 13 | |
| 7 | Santiago Morning | 14 | 4 | 3 | 7 | 28 | 31 | −3 | 11 | |
| 8 | Magallanes | 14 | 3 | 3 | 8 | 16 | 30 | −14 | 9 | |

Notes:

| Home \ Away | AUDI | COLO | MAGA | PALE | SMOR | UESP | UCAT | UCHI |
|---|---|---|---|---|---|---|---|---|
| Audax | | 5–2 | 5–1 | 1–1 | 4–3 | 1–3 | 2–1 | 1–6 |
| Colo-Colo | 2–2 | | 4–0 | 3–2 | 4–3 | 2–4 | 4–3 | 2–3 |
| Magallanes | 1–1 | 3–2 | | 1–0 | 0–2 | 3–3 | 0–1 | 0–1 |
| Palestino | 2–0 | 0–1 | 1–3 | | 2–0 | 0–0 | 3–1 | 1–1 |
| S. Morning | 7–4 | 0–2 | 1–1 | 1–3 | | 2–1 | 3–4 | 2–2 |
| U. Española | 0–3 | 4–3 | 1–0 | 2–1 | 1–2 | | 7–3 | 0–2 |
| U. Católica | 3–2 | 4–3 | 5–2 | 0–2 | 2–1 | 2–2 | | 0–1 |
| U. de Chile | 4–1 | 2–2 | 3–1 | 2–2 | 1–1 | 2–0 | 4–3 | |

Legend: Blue = home team win; Yellow = draw; Red = away team win.

=== Torneo Provincial ===
| Pos | Team | Pld | W | D | L | GF | GA | GD | Pts | Qualification |
|---|---|---|---|---|---|---|---|---|---|---|
| 1 | Rangers | 18 | 7 | 8 | 3 | 25 | 22 | +3 | 22 | Qualified to Torneo Nacional with bonus points (Note: Top 5 teams earned bonus points for the Torneo Nacional: Rangers 5pts, Green Cross Temuco 4pts, Everton 3pts, Huachipato 2pts, Unión La Calera 1pt.) |
| 2 | Green Cross Temuco | 18 | 8 | 5 | 5 | 32 | 24 | +8 | 21 | Qualified to Torneo Nacional with bonus points |
| 3 | Everton | 18 | 7 | 6 | 5 | 34 | 25 | +9 | 20 | Qualified to Torneo Nacional with bonus points |
| 4 | Huachipato | 18 | 6 | 8 | 4 | 25 | 19 | +6 | 20 | Qualified to Torneo Nacional with bonus points |
| 5 | Unión La Calera | 18 | 7 | 6 | 5 | 21 | 20 | +1 | 20 | Qualified to Torneo Nacional with bonus points |
| 6 | Deportes La Serena | 18 | 6 | 7 | 5 | 22 | 23 | −1 | 19 | |
| 7 | O'Higgins | 18 | 3 | 10 | 5 | 23 | 25 | −2 | 16 | |
| 8 | Santiago Wanderers | 18 | 4 | 8 | 6 | 24 | 27 | −3 | 16 | |
| 9 | Deportes Concepción | 18 | 5 | 5 | 8 | 16 | 23 | −7 | 15 | |
| 10 | Antofagasta Portuario | 18 | 3 | 5 | 10 | 20 | 34 | −14 | 11 | |

Notes:

| Home \ Away | ANTP | DCON | EVER | GCRT | HUAC | DLSE | OHIG | RANG | ULCA | SWAN |
|---|---|---|---|---|---|---|---|---|---|---|
| Antofagasta P. | | 0–1 | 1–5 | 1–3 | 1–1 | 2–0 | 0–0 | 1–2 | 1–3 | 2–2 |
| D. Concepción | 2–3 | | 1–0 | 1–3 | 1–3 | 0–0 | 1–1 | 0–1 | 0–2 | 2–2 |
| Everton | 2–1 | 4–1 | | 2–3 | 1–1 | 1–1 | 3–3 | 3–1 | 2–0 | 4–3 |
| Green Cross T. | 1–1 | 0–2 | 0–2 | | 1–3 | 0–1 | 1–1 | 2–2 | 1–1 | 3–2 |
| Huachipato | 1–2 | 0–1 | 2–2 | 1–1 | | 2–1 | 1–1 | 1–1 | 0–1 | 2–2 |
| D. La Serena | 0–0 | 0–0 | 1–1 | 1–4 | 1–0 | | 3–2 | 2–3 | 3–2 | 0–0 |
| O'Higgins | 2–1 | 2–1 | 1–1 | 1–2 | 1–3 | 1–2 | | 0–1 | 1–1 | 1–1 |
| Rangers | 4–1 | 0–0 | 1–0 | 0–2 | 0–0 | 3–5 | 3–3 | | 1–1 | 1–1 |
| U. La Calera | 2–0 | 1–0 | 3–1 | 0–4 | 0–2 | 1–1 | 0–0 | 0–1 | | 2–2 |
| S. Wanderers | 3–2 | 1–2 | 1–0 | 2–1 | 1–2 | 1–0 | 0–2 | 0–0 | 0–1 | |

Legend: Blue = home team win; Yellow = draw; Red = away team win.

== Torneo Nacional ==
=== Zona A ===
| Pos | Team | Pld | W | D | L | GF | GA | GD | BP | Pts | Qualification |
|---|---|---|---|---|---|---|---|---|---|---|---|
| 1 | Colo-Colo | 18 | 11 | 4 | 3 | 36 | 19 | +17 | 2 | 28 | Qualified to Liguilla Final |
| 2 | Unión Española | 18 | 8 | 4 | 6 | 29 | 26 | +3 | 4 | 24 | Qualified to Liguilla Final |
| 3 | Rangers | 18 | 7 | 5 | 6 | 26 | 28 | −2 | 5 | 24 | Qualified to Liguilla Final |
| 4 | Audax Italiano | 18 | 6 | 7 | 5 | 27 | 23 | +4 | 1 | 20 | |
| 5 | Everton | 18 | 5 | 6 | 7 | 30 | 29 | +1 | 3 | 19 | |
| 6 | Deportes La Serena | 18 | 6 | 5 | 7 | 24 | 25 | −1 | 0 | 17 | |
| 7 | O'Higgins | 18 | 7 | 3 | 8 | 21 | 29 | −8 | 0 | 17 | |
| 8 | Antofagasta Portuario | 18 | 5 | 6 | 7 | 19 | 27 | −8 | 0 | 16 | |
| 9 | Magallanes | 18 | 5 | 5 | 8 | 27 | 34 | −7 | 0 | 15 | Plays Relegation play-off |

| Home \ Away | AUDI | COLO | EVER | DLSE | ANTP | OHIG | MAGA | RANG | UESP |
|---|---|---|---|---|---|---|---|---|---|
| Audax | | 0–0 | 2–4 | 3–2 | 4–0 | 1–2 | 3–1 | 1–1 | 3–1 |
| Colo-Colo | 3–1 | | 3–1 | 4–0 | 4–1 | 2–0 | 2–1 | 3–3 | 4–2 |
| Everton | 1–1 | 0–0 | | 1–1 | 4–2 | 5–1 | 5–1 | 1–2 | 1–1 |
| D. La Serena | 2–0 | 0–0 | 0–3 | | 0–0 | 0–0 | 1–1 | 4–0 | 4–2 |
| Antofagasta P. | 0–0 | 0–1 | 1–1 | 3–1 | | 1–1 | 0–0 | 2–1 | 0–1 |
| O'Higgins | 0–2 | 2–1 | 1–0 | 2–1 | 3–1 | | 3–1 | 1–1 | 0–2 |
| Magallanes | 1–1 | 3–1 | 2–2 | 2–3 | 1–1 | 3–1 | | 3–2 | 0–3 |
| Rangers | 1–2 | 1–4 | 1–0 | 1–0 | 4–1 | 2–0 | 1–3 | | 1–0 |
| U. Española | 2–2 | 2–0 | 3–1 | 1–0 | 1–3 | 4–2 | 2–1 | 0–0 | |

Legend: Blue = home team win; Yellow = draw; Red = away team win.

==== Interzone ====
| HUAC | 0–0 | AUDI |
| ULCA | 1–3 | MAGA |
| GCRT | 2–0 | UESP |
| ANTP | 1–0 | PALE |
| RANG | 1–1 | UCAT |
| DLSE | 2–1 | SMOR |
| EVER | 0–4 | SWAN |
| DCON | 1–2 | COLO |
| OHIG | 1–2 | UCHI |

=== Zona B ===
| Pos | Team | Pld | W | D | L | GF | GA | GD | BP | Pts | Qualification |
|---|---|---|---|---|---|---|---|---|---|---|---|
| 1 | Santiago Wanderers | 18 | 11 | 6 | 1 | 37 | 18 | +19 | 0 | 28 | Qualified to Liguilla Final |
| 2 | Universidad de Chile | 18 | 9 | 2 | 7 | 29 | 23 | +6 | 5 | 25 | Qualified to Liguilla Final |
| 3 | Green Cross Temuco | 18 | 5 | 7 | 6 | 25 | 21 | +4 | 4 | 21 | Qualified to Liguilla Final |
| 4 | Huachipato | 18 | 4 | 11 | 3 | 19 | 19 | 0 | 2 | 21 | |
| 5 | Universidad Católica | 18 | 7 | 5 | 6 | 32 | 30 | +2 | 0 | 19 | |
| 6 | Palestino | 18 | 4 | 7 | 7 | 23 | 25 | −2 | 3 | 18 | |
| 7 | Deportes Concepción | 18 | 5 | 5 | 8 | 20 | 21 | −1 | 0 | 15 | |
| 8 | Unión La Calera | 18 | 4 | 6 | 8 | 21 | 32 | −11 | 1 | 15 | |
| 9 | Santiago Morning | 18 | 5 | 2 | 11 | 20 | 36 | −16 | 0 | 12 | Plays Relegation play-off |

| Home \ Away | DCON | GCRT | HUAC | ULCA | SMOR | UCAT | PALE | UCHI | SWAN |
|---|---|---|---|---|---|---|---|---|---|
| D. Concepción | | 1–0 | 0–0 | 1–1 | 1–0 | 2–1 | 3–1 | 1–2 | 1–1 |
| Green Cross T. | 0–0 | | 1–1 | 1–0 | 8–0 | 1–2 | 1–0 | 1–3 | 2–2 |
| Huachipato | 1–1 | 1–2 | | 1–1 | 1–1 | 0–1 | 1–1 | 2–1 | 1–1 |
| U. La Calera | 3–2 | 0–0 | 1–1 | | 1–3 | 2–0 | 2–2 | 0–2 | 0–1 |
| S. Morning | 2–1 | 1–0 | 1–3 | 0–0 | | 1–2 | 3–1 | 0–1 | 2–3 |
| U. Católica | 2–1 | 4–1 | 0–0 | 6–1 | 2–1 | | 2–2 | 2–4 | 3–3 |
| Palestino | 2–1 | 2–2 | 4–1 | 3–2 | 0–1 | 1–1 | | 3–1 | 1–1 |
| U. de Chile | 2–1 | 0–0 | 1–2 | 2–3 | 2–0 | 4–1 | 0–0 | | 1–2 |
| S. Wanderers | 1–0 | 2–2 | 0–1 | 3–1 | 5–1 | 2–1 | 1–0 | 2–1 | |

Legend: Blue = home team win; Yellow = draw; Red = away team win.

==== Interzone ====
| OHIG | 1–0 | PALE |
| EVER | 0–3 | SWAN |
| GCRT | 1–2 | COLO |
| DLSE | 3–1 | UCAT |
| ANTP | 2–0 | UCHI |
| ULCA | 2–1 | AUDI |
| RANG | 3–2 | SMOR |
| HUAC | 2–2 | UESP |
| DCON | 2–0 | MAGA |

== Final Stage ==
=== Liguilla Final ===
| Pos | Team | Pld | W | D | L | GF | GA | GD | Pts | Qualification |
|---|---|---|---|---|---|---|---|---|---|---|
| 1 | Universidad de Chile | 5 | 4 | 1 | 0 | 10 | 4 | +6 | 9 | Champions, qualified to 1970 Copa Libertadores |
| 2 | Rangers | 5 | 3 | 1 | 1 | 10 | 8 | +2 | 7 | Qualified to 1970 Copa Libertadores |
| 3 | Green Cross Temuco | 5 | 2 | 1 | 2 | 6 | 4 | +2 | 5 | Qualified to Copa Ganadores de Copa play-off |
| 4 | Unión Española | 5 | 2 | 1 | 2 | 10 | 11 | −1 | 5 | Qualified to Copa Ganadores de Copa play-off |
| 5 | Colo-Colo | 5 | 1 | 2 | 2 | 8 | 10 | −2 | 4 | |
| 6 | Santiago Wanderers | 5 | 0 | 0 | 5 | 5 | 12 | −7 | 0 | |

| Home \ Away | COLO | GCRT | RANG | UESP | UCHI | SWAN |
|---|---|---|---|---|---|---|
| Colo-Colo | | 0–0 | 1–2 | | 2–2 | 2–1 |
| Green Cross T. | | | | | | |
| Rangers | | 3–1 | | | | |
| U. Española | 5–3 | 0–2 | 2–2 | | | 3–2 |
| U. de Chile | | 1–0 | 3–1 | 2–0 | | 2–1 |
| S. Wanderers | | 0–3 | 1–2 | | | |

Legend: Blue = home team win; Yellow = draw; Red = away team win.

Campeonato Profesional
1969 champion

Universidad de Chile
7th title

=== Relegation play-off ===
| Magallanes | 4–1 | S. Morning | 1–2 |

| Pos | Team | Pld | W | D | L | GF | GA | GD | Pts | Relegation |
|---|---|---|---|---|---|---|---|---|---|---|
| 1 | Magallanes | 2 | 2 | 0 | 0 | 6 | 2 | +4 | 4 | |
| 2 | Santiago Morning | 2 | 0 | 0 | 2 | 2 | 6 | −4 | 0 | Relegated to 1970 Segunda División de Chile |

== Topscorer ==
| Name | Team | Goals |
|---|---|---|
| (Paraguay) Eladio Zárate | Unión Española | 22 |
| (Uruguay) Alberto Ferrero | Santiago Wanderers | 20 |
| (Argentina) Osvaldo González | Green Cross Temuco | 18 |

== Copa Ganadores de Copa 1970 play-off ==
| 13 February 1970 | Green Cross Temuco | 1 – 2 | Unión Española | Municipal de Temuco, Temuco |
| | Body 56' | | 32' Véliz; 78' Zárate | Attendance: 7,000; Referee: J. Cruzat |

| 18 February 1970 | Unión Española | 3 – 2 | Green Cross Temuco | Estadio San Eugenio, Santiago |
| | Farías 6'; Zárate 47'; Véliz 85' | | 53' (pen.) Orellana; 90' O. González | Attendance: 3,312; Referee: D. Massaro |

Unión Española qualified for the 1970 Copa Ganadores de Copa

== Copa Francisco Candelori ==
Played between the winners of the Torneo Metropolitano 1969 (Universidad de Chile) and Torneo Provincial 1969 (Rangers).

| 29 June 1969 | Universidad de Chile | 1 – 0 | Rangers | Estadio Santa Laura, Santiago |
| | Sánchez 50' (pen.) | | | Attendance: 6,641; Referee: L. Cantillana |

| 6 July 1969 | Rangers | 1 – 1 | Universidad de Chile | Estadio Fiscal, Talca |
| | Barreto 24' | | 34' Arratia | Attendance: 12,257; Referee: J. Cruzat |

Universidad de Chile won the Copa Francisco Candelori
