= Copa Ganadores de Copa =

South American football tournament (1970–71)

- Organizer(s): CONMEBOL
- Founded: 1970
- Abolished: 1971; 54 years ago
- Region: South America
- Teams: 8
- Related competitions: Copa Libertadores
- Last champion: Mariscal Santa Cruz (1970)

The Copa Ganadores de Copa, also known as Recopa Sudamericana de Clubes, was a South American football tournament organized by CONMEBOL. Its first edition was held in 1970 and was won by Bolivian club Mariscal Santa Cruz. The second edition was organized in 1971, however, Group One matches have never been played and the tournament reduced to a friendly competition at the end and the winner of Group Two was crowned the champion. The competition was not held after this year.

The tournament was contested by football clubs which were the most recent winners of South American domestic cup competitions or the highest team club that did not qualify for the Copa Libertadores. The actual qualifying criteria varied across countries.

It should not be confused with Recopa Sudamericana, the competition played between the champion of Copa Libertadores and Copa Sudamericana.

== Format ==
The competition was a round robin tournament with two groups, each group was played in a different city. The group winners qualify for the two-legged final.

Different countries used different methods of qualification.

- Argentina: Winner of Copa Argentina (in 1970, as the winner Boca Juniors earned eligibility of Copa Libertadores, the runner-up Atlanta entered this tournament)
- Bolivia: Winner of Play-off between the two teams tied on points in 3rd place of the Copa Simón Bolívar 1969
- Chile: Winner of Play-off between the two teams tied on points in 3rd place of the 1969 Chilean League.
- Ecuador: Winner of Copa Ecuador
- Paraguay: The highest-placed team in the league not to qualify for the Copa Libertadores
- Peru: The highest-placed team in the league not to qualify for the Copa Libertadores
- Uruguay: Winner of the Torneo de Copa
- Venezuela: Winner of the Copa de Venezuela (in 1970, as the winner Deportivo Galicia earned eligibility of Copa Libertadores, the runner-up Unión Deportiva Canarias entered this tournament)

== 1970 ==
Keys

- aet: after extra time
- p: defined on penalty shoot-out
- Match decided by a penalty shootout after extra time
- Match playoff after the series ended tied on aggregate
- Defined on penalty shoot-out in the second leg

Year	Winners	1st. leg	2nd. leg	Playoff/ Agg.	Runners-up	Venue (1st leg)	City (1st leg)	Venue (2nd leg)	City (2nd leg)
1970	(Bolivia) Mariscal Santa Cruz	0–0	2–0	–	(Ecuador) El Nacional	Olímpico Atahualpa	Quito	Estadio La Paz	La Paz

== 1971 ==
=== Teams ===
Group One:
(Uruguay) Huracán Buceo
(Chile) Deportes Concepción
one undefined team from Argentina
one undefined team from Bolivia

Group Two:
(Ecuador) América de Quito
(Paraguay) Olimpia
(Peru) Juan Aurich
(Venezuela) Valencia

=== Group 2 ===
Pos	Team	Pld	W	D	L	GF	GA	GD	Pts	Qualification
1	(Ecuador) América de Quito	3	2	1	0	5	0	+5	5	Champion
2	(Paraguay) Olimpia	3	1	2	0	2	1	+1	4	
3	(Venezuela) Valencia	3	0	2	1	2	3	−1	2	
4	(Peru) Juan Aurich	3	0	1	2	3	8	−5	1	

=== Results ===
Brazil and Colombia decided not to enter the competition again. The same format was adopted as the previous session.

Nonetheless, on February 25, 1971, CONMEBOL decided to reduce it into a friendly tournament and there would not be a trophy, because Deportes Concepción withdrew from the tournament and confirmation of participation had not been received from Huracán Buceo. Matches in Group One were never played and América, the winner of Group Two, was regarded as the champion of the friendly tournament. But although CONMEBOL does not list the 1971 edition as an official tournament, the IFFHS (International Federation of Football History and Statistics) count it as an official competition to his numbers and records.

Group Two matches were played in parallel with Group Five matches of the 1971 Copa Libertadores.

==== Round 1 ====
28 February 1971	Olimpia (Paraguay)	2–1	(Peru) Juan Aurich	Quito

28 February 1971	América de Quito (Ecuador)	1–0	(Venezuela) Valencia	Quito

==== Round 2 ====
3 March 1971	América de Quito (Ecuador)	4–0	(Peru) Juan Aurich	Quito

3 March 1971	Olimpia (Paraguay)	0–0	(Venezuela) Valencia	Quito

==== Round 3 ====
7 March 1971	América de Quito (Ecuador)	0–0	(Paraguay) Olimpia	Quito

7 March 1971	Valencia (Venezuela)	2–2	(Peru) Juan Aurich	Quito
