= Leonardo Véliz =

Chilean footballer (born 1945)

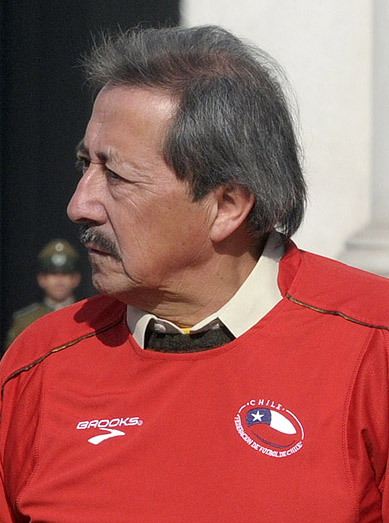
- Véliz in 2011

Personal information
- Full name: Leonardo Iván Véliz Díaz
- Date of birth: September 3, 1945 (age 81)
- Place of birth: Valparaíso, Chile
- Position: Left winger

Youth career
- Juventud Unida

Senior career*
Years	Team	Apps	(Gls)
1964–1967	Everton		
1968–1971	Unión Española	110	(28)
1972–1974	Colo-Colo	84	(14)
1975–1978	Unión Española	118	(28)
1979–1982	Colo-Colo	78	(5)
1983	O'Higgins	14	(1)

International career
1966–1981	Chile	39	(2)

Managerial career
- 1991–1993: Chile U17
- 1992–1995: Chile U20
- 1998–2000: Sporting CP (youth)
- * Club domestic league appearances and goals

Leonardo Iván Véliz Díaz (born September 3, 1945) is a Chilean former footballer who played as a left winger for Everton, O'Higgins, Unión Española and Colo-Colo of Chile and in the Chile national team in the 1974 FIFA World Cup in Germany.

== Managerial career ==
He worked as manager of both Chile U17 and Chile U20, leading the first in the 1993 FIFA World Championship and the second in the 1995 FIFA World Youth Championship.

From 1998 to 2000 he worked for the Sporting CP youth system, where he coincided with players such as Cristiano Ronaldo, Ricardo Quaresma and Fábio Paím.

== Personal life ==
He is well known by his nickname Pollo (Chicken).

His son, Daniel Sebastián Véliz, represented Chile at under-20 level in the 1992 South American Championship.

In 2004, he was elected a councillor of Santiago, supported by Party for Democracy. In 2009, he was a candidate for deputy, supported by for Nueva Mayoría para Chile. In 2010, he switched to the other political hand after supporting Sebastián Piñera in his candidacy for President of Chile.

== Honours ==
Unión Española

- Chilean Primera División: 1975, 1977

Colo-Colo

- Chilean Primera División: 1972, 1979, 1981

Chile

- Copa O'Higgins: 1966
- Copa Carlos Dittborn: 1973
