= 1975 Copa Libertadores =

16th season of Copa Libertadores

1975 Copa Libertadores de América
Tournament details
- Dates: February 16 – June 29
- Teams: 21 (from 10 associations)

Final positions
- Champions: (Argentina) Independiente (6th title)
- Runners-up: (Chile) Unión Española

Tournament statistics
- Matches played: 76
- Goals scored: 209 (2.75 per match)

The Copa Libertadores 1975 was an association football competition contested between the top clubs of the CONMEBOL federation. Defending champions Independiente won the competition, defeating Unión Española 2–0 in a play-off after the original two legs finished 2–2 on points. This was Independiente's fourth Copa Libertadores title in a row and a record-extending 6th title.

== Qualified teams ==
Country	Team	Qualification method
CONMEBOL (1 berth)	Independiente	1974 Copa Libertadores champion
Argentina (2 berths)	Rosario Central	1974 Torneo Reducido winner
Argentina (2 berths)	Newell's Old Boys	1974 Torneo Reducido runner-up
Bolivia (2 berths)	The Strongest	1974 Primera División champion
Bolivia (2 berths)	Jorge Wilstermann	1974 Primera División runner-up
Brazil (2 berths)	Vasco da Gama	1974 Campeonato Brasileiro Série A champion
Brazil (2 berths)	Cruzeiro	1974 Campeonato Brasileiro Série A runner-up
Chile (2 berths)	Huachipato	1974 Primera División champion
Chile (2 berths)	Unión Española	1974 Liguilla_Pre-Libertadores winner
Colombia (2 berths)	Deportivo Cali	1974 Campeonato Profesional champion
Colombia (2 berths)	Atlético Nacional	1974 Campeonato Profesional runner-up
Ecuador (2 berths)	LDU Quito	1974 Campeonato Ecuatoriano champion
Ecuador (2 berths)	El Nacional	1974 Campeonato Ecuatoriano runner-up
Paraguay (2 berths)	Cerro Porteño	1974 Primera División champion
Paraguay (2 berths)	Olimpia	1974 Primera División runner-up
Peru (2 berths)	Universitario	1974 Primera División champion
Peru (2 berths)	Unión Huaral	1974 Primera División runner-up
Uruguay (2 berths)	Peñarol	1974 Liguilla Pre-Libertadores winner
Uruguay (2 berths)	Montevideo Wanderers	1974 Liguilla Pre-Libertadores runner-up
Venezuela (2 berths)	Deportivo Galicia	1974 Primera División champion
Venezuela (2 berths)	Portuguesa	1974 Primera División runner-up

== Draw ==
The champions and runners-up of each football association were drawn into the same group along with another football association's participating teams. Three clubs from Argentina competed as Independiente was champion of the 1974 Copa Libertadores. They entered the tournament in the Semifinals.

Group 1	Group 2	Group 3	Group 4	Group 5
Argentina; Paraguay	Bolivia; Chile	Brazil; Colombia	Ecuador; Venezuela	Peru; Uruguay

== Group stage ==
=== Group 1 ===
Pos	Team	Pld	W	D	L	GF	GA	GD	Pts	Qualification or relegation	(Argentina) ROS	(Argentina) NOB	(Paraguay) OLI	(Paraguay) CER
1	(Argentina) Rosario Central	6	2	4	0	8	5	+3	8	Qualified to the Semi-finals	—	1–1	1–1	2–1
2	(Argentina) Newell's Old Boys	6	3	2	1	9	8	+1	8		1–1	—	3–2	3–2
3	(Paraguay) Olimpia	6	2	3	1	7	5	+2	7		0–0	2–0	—	2–1
4	(Paraguay) Cerro Porteño	6	0	1	5	5	11	−6	1		1–3	0–1	0–0	—

=== Group 2 ===
Pos	Team	Pld	W	D	L	GF	GA	GD	Pts		(Chile) UES	(Chile) HUA	(Bolivia) STR	(Bolivia) WIL
1	(Chile) Unión Española	6	3	3	0	17	5	+12	9	Qualified to the Semi-finals	—	7–2	4–0	4–1
2	(Chile) Huachipato	6	2	2	2	10	10	0	6		0–0	—	4–2	4–0
3	(Bolivia) The Strongest	6	2	2	2	8	11	−3	6		1–1	1–0	—	3–1
4	(Bolivia) Jorge Wilstermann	6	0	3	3	4	13	−9	3		1–1	0–0	1–1	—

Source: Copa Libertadores 1975

=== Group 3 ===
Pos	Team	Pld	W	D	L	GF	GA	GD	Pts	Qualification or relegation	(Brazil) CRU	(Colombia) CAL	(Colombia) ATL	(Brazil) VAS
1	(Brazil) Cruzeiro	6	3	1	2	10	9	+1	7	Qualified to the Semi-finals	—	2–1	2–3	3–2
2	(Colombia) Deportivo Cali	6	2	2	2	5	5	0	6		1–0	—	0–0	2–1
3	(Colombia) Atlético Nacional	6	2	2	2	7	8	−1	6		1–2	2–1	—	1–1
4	(Brazil) Vasco da Gama	6	1	3	2	7	7	0	5		1–1	0–0	2–0	—

=== Group 4 ===
Pos	Team	Pld	W	D	L	GF	GA	GD	Pts	Qualification or relegation	(Ecuador) LDQ	(Venezuela) POR	(Venezuela) DGA	(Ecuador) NAC
1	(Ecuador) LDU Quito	6	3	3	0	12	7	+5	9	Qualified to the Semi-finals	—	1–1	4–2	3–1
2	(Venezuela) Portuguesa	6	1	4	1	5	8	−3	6		1–1	—	1–1	1–0
3	(Venezuela) Deportivo Galicia	6	1	3	2	7	6	+1	5		0–1	0–0	—	4–0
4	(Ecuador) El Nacional	6	1	2	3	8	11	−3	4		2–2	5–1	0–0	—

=== Group 5 ===
Pos	Team	Pld	W	D	L	GF	GA	GD	Pts	Qualification or relegation	(Peru) UNI	(Uruguay) PEÑ	(Uruguay) WAN	(Peru) HUA
1	(Peru) Universitario	6	4	2	0	12	6	+6	10	Qualified to the Semi-finals	—	3–2	3–1	2–2
2	(Uruguay) Peñarol	6	4	0	2	13	7	+6	8		0–1	—	1–0	5–2
3	(Uruguay) Montevideo Wanderers	6	1	1	4	8	10	−2	3		0–2	1–2	—	4–0
4	(Peru) Unión Huaral	6	0	3	3	7	17	−10	3		1–1	0–3	2–2	—

== Semi-finals ==
=== Group 1 ===
Pos	Team	Pld	W	D	L	GF	GA	GD	Pts	Qualification or relegation	(Chile) UE	(Peru) UNI	(Ecuador) LDQ
1	(Chile) Unión Española	4	2	1	1	7	6	+1	5	Qualified to the Final	—	2–1	2–0
2	(Peru) Universitario	4	1	2	1	4	4	0	4		1–1	—	2–1
3	(Ecuador) LDU Quito	4	1	1	2	5	6	−1	3		4–2	0–0	—

=== Group 2 ===
Pos	Team	Pld	W	D	L	GF	GA	GD	Pts	Qualification or relegation	(Argentina) IND	(Argentina) CEN	(Brazil) CRU
1	(Argentina) Independiente	4	2	0	2	5	4	+1	4	Qualified to the Final	—	2–0	3–0
2	(Argentina) Rosario Central	4	2	0	2	5	5	0	4		2–0	—	3–1
3	(Brazil) Cruzeiro	4	2	0	2	5	6	−1	4		2–0	2–0	—

== Finals ==
June 18, 1975	Unión Española (Chile)	1–0	(Argentina) Independiente	Estadio Nacional, Santiago
	Ahumada 87'			Attendance: 65,000; Referee: Martínez Bazán (Uruguay)

June 25, 1975	Independiente (Argentina)	3−1	(Chile) Unión Española	Estadio La Doble Visera, Avellaneda
	Rojas 1'; Pavoni 57'; Bertoni 82'		Las Heras 15'	Attendance: 60,000; Referee: Barreto (Uruguay)

=== Extra match ===
June 29, 1975	Independiente (Argentina)	2−0	(Chile) Unión Española	Estadio Defensores del Chaco, Asunción
	Ruiz Moreno 13'; Bertoni 87'			Attendance: 55,000; Referee: Pérez (Peru)

== Champion ==
1975 Copa Libertadores Champions
(Argentina)
Independiente
Sixth title
