= History of Club Deportivo Universidad Católica =

History of Chilean association football club Club Deportivo Universidad Católica

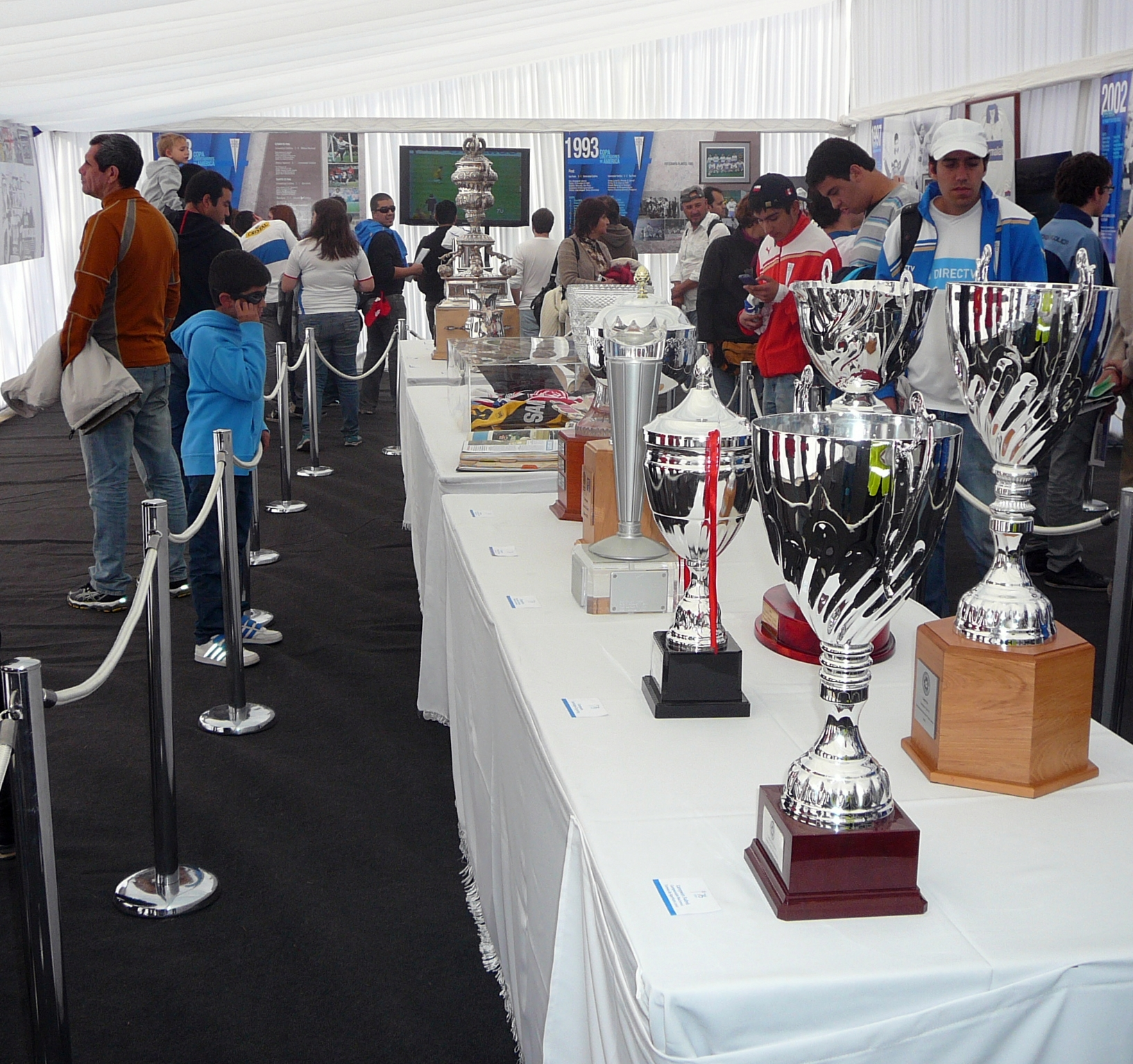
Part of the Universidad Católica Museum on its seventy-sixth anniversary.

The history of Universidad Católica officially begins on April 21, 1937. It has been one of the four Chilean teams to have contested a Copa Libertadores de América final and was the last to do so (1993). Universidad Católica was designated as a Classic Club by FIFA in 2012.

The club has won 16 national Primera División championships, 4 Copa Chile, 4 Supercopa de Chile, 1 Copa de la República, 2 Segunda División titles, and 11 Liguillas (8 Pre-Libertadores and 3 Pre-Sudamericana). Internationally, it won the 1993 Copa Interamericana. Additionally, it has been one of the four Chilean teams to have contested a Copa Libertadores de América final and was the last to do so, in 1993. Regarding unofficial international tournaments, it won the International Easter Tournament in 1950, organized by the Catalan Federation.

== Background ==
=== Universidad Católica Football Club ===
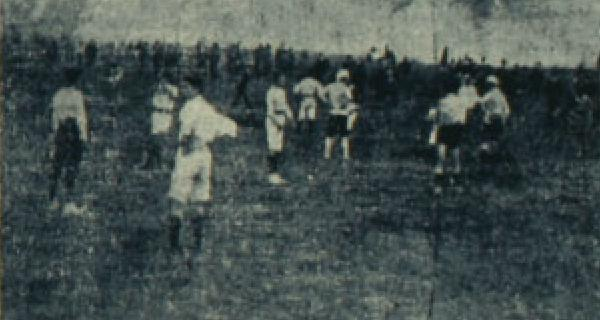
Universidad Católica F.C. 4:1 Universidad de Chile, November 14, 1909.

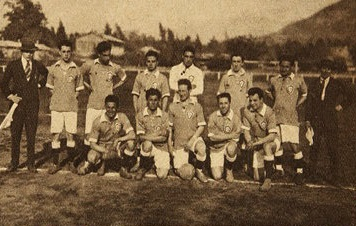
Universidad Católica F.C. in 1923

The earliest records of the football branch of the club are found in the participation of Universidad Católica Football Club in the first division of the Asociación Nacional de Football in 1908, a parallel entity to the Asociación de Fútbol de Santiago which included clubs such as Santiago Football Club.

"The Club Deportivo Universidad Católica already existed, it only needed to be founded."

The following year, Universidad Católica F.C. played the first edition of the Clásico Universitario against a team from the University of Chile at the Cancha del Carmen, resulting in a 3:3 draw on November 1, 1909. On that occasion, UC F.C., whose kit was reportedly green, lined up with García in goal; Eyquem and Harriet in defense; R. Rodríguez, Rochefort and D. Rodríguez in midfield; and Livingstone, Víctor Vergara, Vigneaux, Castro and Bordeu in attack. The team made a comeback from a 3-0 deficit, tying the game with two goals from Vergara and one from Castro.

They faced each other again on November 14 of the same year. In that match, called the Return Match, the performances of Torres, Universidad Católica's goalkeeper, and the combined efforts of his teammates Vergara, Rochefort, Livingstone and Castro stood out. Both teams battled for victory and the attending public enjoyed a great spectacle. Católica F.C. won 4:1 over Universidad de Chile. In subsequent years, the Universidad Católica football club continued competing as an amateur team in various associations in the capital city.

=== The UC Sports Federation ===
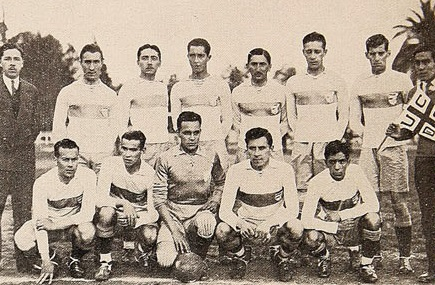
Universidad Católica in 1930, seven years before its official foundation.

In 1927, it became part of the Catholic University Sports Federation, which grouped together the various sports disciplines practiced at the university, founded on August 30 of that same year. In 1930, the Sports Federation joined the Club Universitario de Deportes, with which it continued to compete jointly until its separation in 1936, motivated mainly by the lack of identification and interest of students from the Pontifical Catholic University of Chile in participating in the club's activities, as well as by the predominance of the University of Chile in both the sporting and leadership areas of the club.

That same year, the football branch, led by former player Enrique Teuche, began to play a series of friendly matches against semi-professional and professional teams from the Asociación de Fútbol de Santiago, among them Green Cross, whom they defeated 6:4, and Colo-Colo, against whom they lost 3:1.

=== Foundation and early years ===
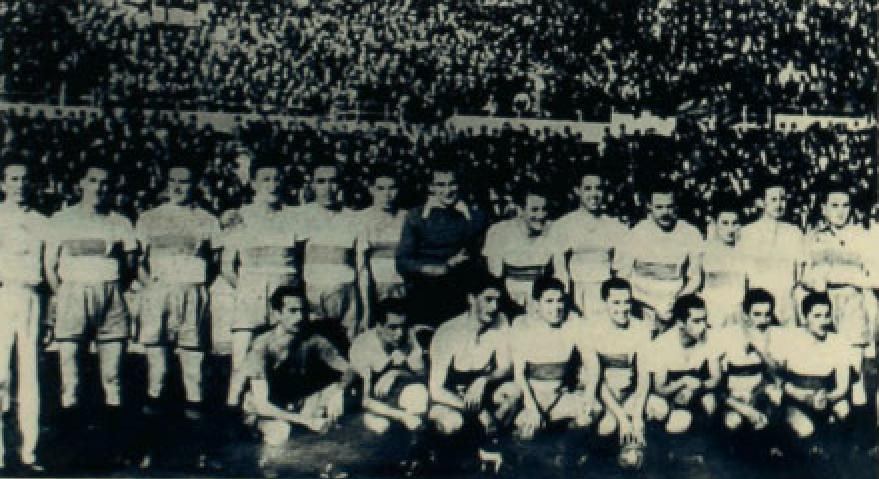
Universidad Católica in 1939.

After its split from the Club Universitario de Deportes, the club began its process of affiliation with the Asociación Fútbol Profesional, which was approved on April 19, 1937. For this reason, a group of students from the Universidad Católica met at a boarding house in Santiago to discuss the organization of a sports club with legal status. Although the book Historia del Fútbol Chileno, Diario La Nación, dates the first foundation to August 23, 1927, the club was officially constituted on April 21, 1937. The following individuals were elected to their respective positions: Augusto Gómez, President; Enrique Casorzo and Oscar Álvarez, Vice Presidents; Enrique Pascual, Secretary; Carlos Bown, Vice-Secretary; Néstor Braithwaite, Treasurer; and Roberto Balbontín, Assistant Treasurer.

That same year, it began participating in Serie B, a tournament that served as the second tier of the AFP. That season, it grouped together four amateur clubs and the reserve teams of the most prominent first-division institutions. In its first season in Serie B, Universidad Católica finished in third place behind Universidad de Chile and Santiago National. Against Universidad de Chile, it played the first Clásico Universitario in history on June 13, 1937, losing 1-2.

The following year, both clubs requested entry to the first division of the Asociación Central de Fútbol, constituted that same year. However, the ACF estimated that it could only accept one university team. Given this situation, it was decided that both clubs would face first division professional clubs within the framework of the Campeonato de Apertura. Universidad Católica was defeated by Colo-Colo, the previous season's champion, 6:2, while Universidad de Chile lost 2:1 to Audax Italiano. The better performance of the latter led the ACF directors to decide in favor of its application to the detriment of Universidad Católica, which had to postpone its entry into the top category of Chilean football until 1939. In its first season in the first division, Universidad Católica finished in fourth place.

== 1940s: The first national championship ==
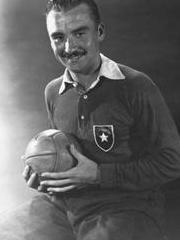
Sergio Livingstone, goalkeeper and champion in 1949, 1954, and 1956.

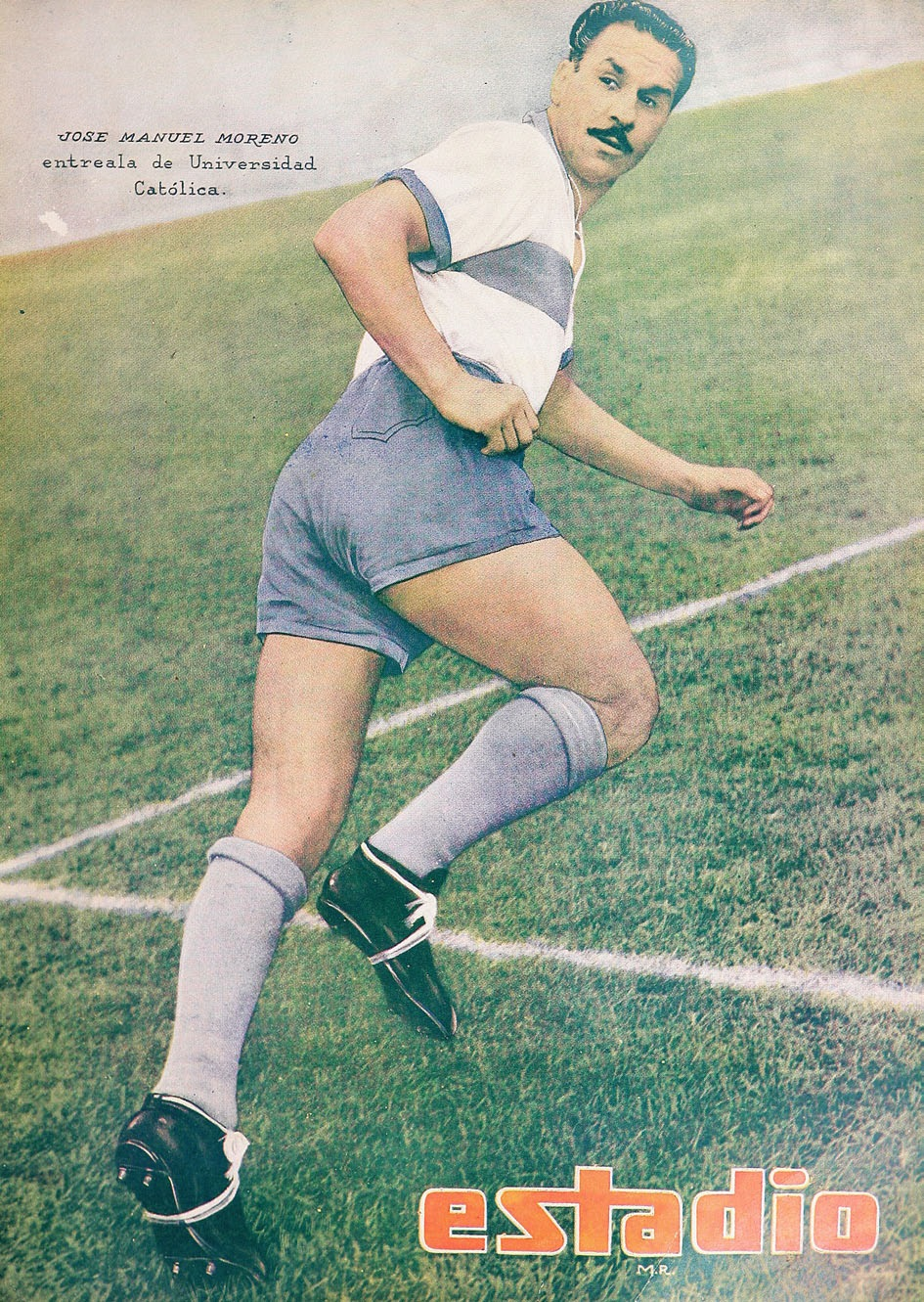
José Manuel Moreno playing for Universidad Católica.

The 1940s began with Universidad Católica placed ninth out of ten teams. In subsequent years, things did not improve, finishing sixth in 1941 and ninth again in 1942. In 1943 and 1944 the club managed to reverse the trend by finishing in fifth place; the latter year saw the return of Sergio Livingstone after his stint with Racing Club. However, in the following seasons the club did not perform well, finishing at the bottom of the national league, with the exception of the 1947 season when it placed fifth. During this period the club inaugurated the Estadio Independencia on October 12, 1945.

Alongside the efforts made in sporting activities, there was a spirit of adventure in the club in the mid-1940s which later led to the first tours abroad. On December 14, 1946, Mauricio Wainer, Pedro Sáez, Aurelio Pozo and Juan Riera embarked on a journey in a Ford 1939. The goal was to travel by road from Santiago to New York, and they achieved it on April 14, 1947. Along the way, they met widely recognized entertainment stars such as María Félix, Lucille Ball and Walt Disney.

=== First national title ===
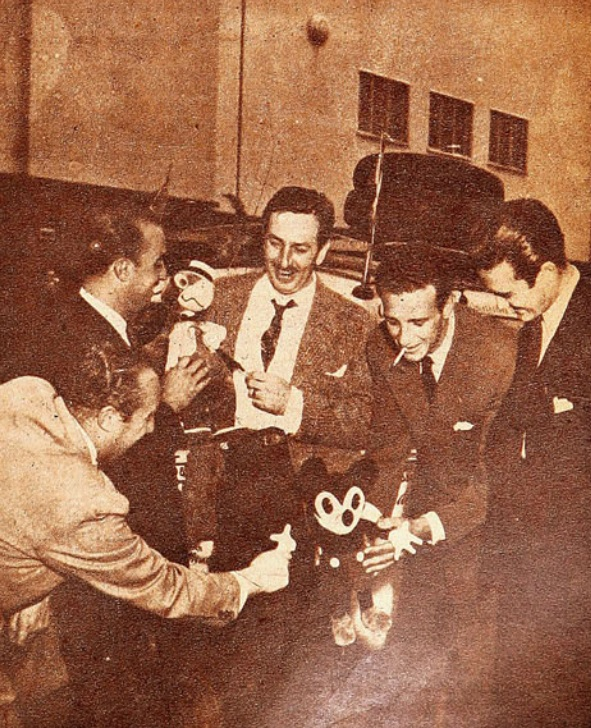
Meeting between representatives of Universidad Católica and Walt Disney.

1949 Primera División de Chile

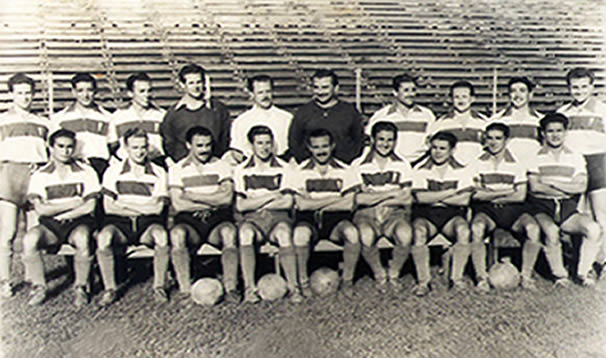
The team that won the 1949 tournament.

On April 30, 1949, Universidad Católica won the consolation tournament of the Apertura Championship after defeating Bádminton 3–2 in the final.

That same season, under the technical direction of Alberto Buccicardi and with the Argentine José Manuel Moreno, who arrived from River Plate for $ 1,450,000, as the main figure, the club won its first Primera División de Chile championship, after defeating Audax Italiano 2:1 in the penultimate round on November 27 of that year.

In the days leading up to the match against Audax Italiano, there was much talk about a serious injury to Moreno, who nevertheless was able to perform excellently. For Católica, Fernando Riera and Raimundo Infante scored; in the final minutes there was a consolation goal from Rinaldi. The match was played at the Estadio Nacional and was attended by 23,381 spectators. The group was able to come together thanks to its foundation in the club's youth system. Besides Moreno, the champion squad included Raimundo Infante, Andrés Prieto, Manuel Álvarez, Hernán Carvallo, Luis Lindorfo Mayanés, Fernando Riera, and Sergio Livingstone.

== 1950s: Institutional crisis and relegation ==
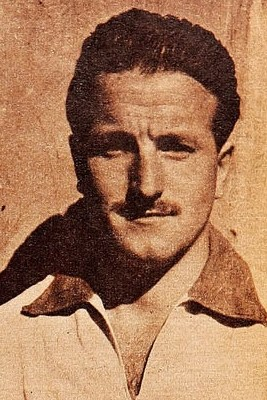
Hernán Carvallo, champion with Universidad Católica in 1949, 1954 and 1956 (B).

The 1950 World Cup had a considerable impact on the global football environment, and Universidad Católica contributed a total of eight players to the Chilean National Team: Manuel Álvarez, Hernán Carvallo, Raimundo Infante, Luis Lindorfo Mayanés, Sergio Livingstone, Andrés Prieto, Fernando Riera and Fernando Roldán, as well as coach Alberto Buccicardi. In 1950, Católica embarked on its first tour of Europe, where it won the International Easter Tournament in Catalonia, and also, on May 1, defeated Bayern Munich 4:3 in a friendly match in Munich. After returning to the country, it defeated the Chile national football team 3:2 on May 31. At the local level, Universidad Católica finished eleventh in 1950, the year it undertook its first European tour, seventh in 1951, and eighth in 1952, a season in which it undertook another extensive tour.

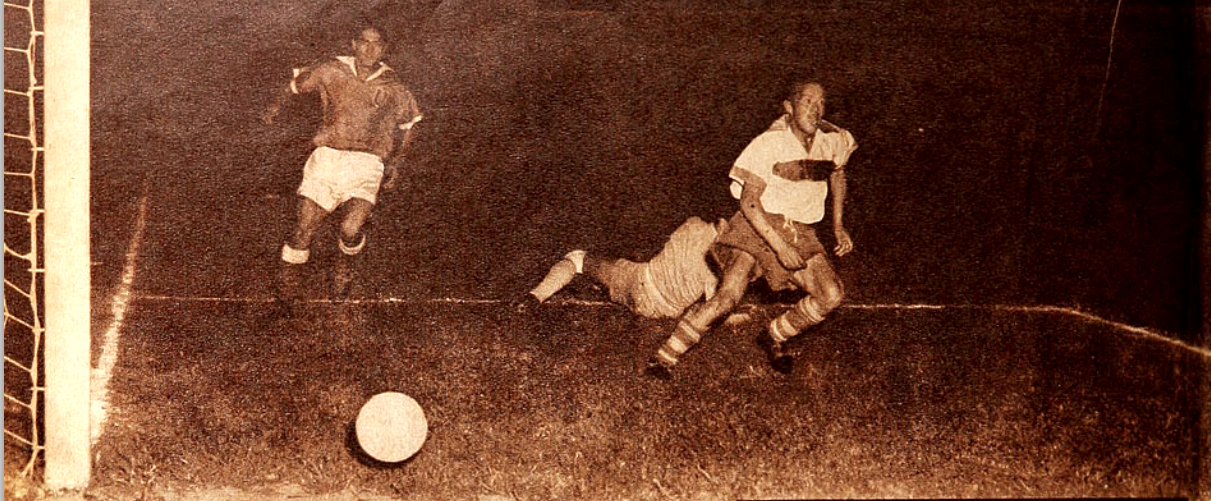
Third goal by Miguel Ángel Montuori in Universidad Católica's 5:0 thrashing of Universidad de Chile in 1954.

Locally, it repeated the eighth-place finish of the previous season in 1953. The club performed modestly in local competitions until 1954, a season in which it assembled a competitive team with Sergio Livingstone, Raimundo Infante, Romualdo Moro and Miguel Ángel Montuori as the team's key figures. In early 1954, Universidad Católica defeated the El Salvador national team 3:1 on February 7 and Venezuela 2:1, as visitors, on the 23rd of the same month. On November 24, 1954, it beat Universidad de Chile 5:0 in the highest-scoring Clásico Universitario. Horacio Cisternas, Romualdo Moro and Miguel Ángel Montuori each scored a goal, with Montuori netting three times.

On the final matchday of the 1954 Primera División de Chile, the team was crowned champion with a one-point advantage over Colo-Colo. On January 9, 1955, before 57,234 spectators at the Estadio Nacional, the decisive match was played precisely against the runner-up, Colo-Colo. The group's determination to triumph against any obstacle was revealed by the pre-match history. Sergio Livingstone and Fernando Roldán, another mainstay of the team, were unable to play in that duel corresponding to the final round of the title playoff. Although he was replacing a key player in the team, Sergio Litvak performed admirably in goal and the championship went to the Franja when the referee's final whistle blew for the 0:0 draw.

A year later the club suffered its first relegation to the Segunda División, with Enrique Casorzo assuming the club presidency for the second time. On Saturday, November 10, 1956, again with Sergio Livingstone in goal and Raimundo Infante as the team's top scorer, Universidad Católica won the Segunda División title by defeating Deportes La Serena 3:2. Thus, it was promoted to the Serie de Honor. In 1957, a three-way tie on points with O'Higgins and Ferrobádminton in the Relegation Playoff, and a goal difference of (-1), again destabilized the institution, but it avoided relegation thanks to an improper registration by San Luis. The sixth place in 1958 and the eighth in 1959 reflected campaigns without sporting success or major upsets.

=== 1954 National Championship winner ===
1954 Primera División de Chile

Locally, the club performed modestly until 1954, a season in which Católica won its 2nd professional title, with Sergio Livingstone, Raimundo Infante, Romualdo Moro and Miguel Ángel Montuori as key figures. On the final matchday of the tournament, played on January 9, 1955, before 57,234 spectators at the Estadio Nacional, it faced Colo-Colo and won the title by being one point ahead, precisely its rival that afternoon. Sergio Livingstone and Fernando Roldán, another mainstay of the team, were unable to play in the decisive duel. Although he was replacing a key player, Sergio Litvak performed admirably in goal and the championship went to the Franja when the referee's final whistle blew for the 0:0 draw.

"I wanted to speak, but all I could do was shout. If I could have, I would have run into the street. But I could barely make it halfway around the Olympic-length track. What an emotional experience! It was the strongest emotion of my life." Juan Antonio Baum

=== Relegation and 1956 Segunda División title ===
1956 Segunda División de Chile

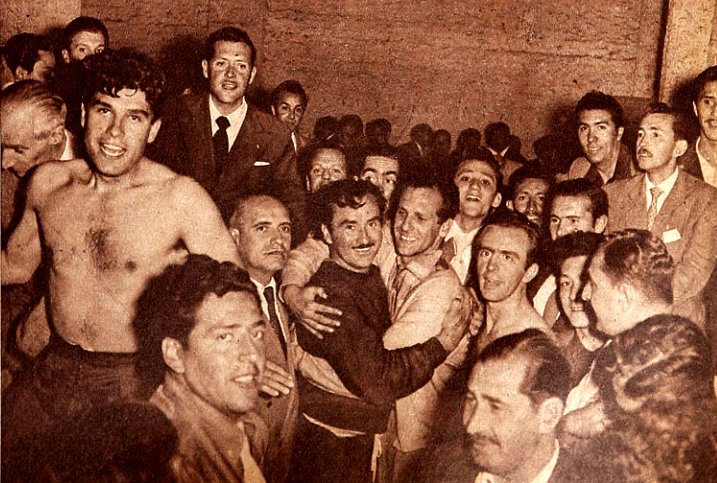
Universidad Católica players celebrating the 1956 Promotion title.

The following year, the club was relegated to the Segunda División, an event that was unprecedented for the institution until then. A change in administration was needed, and for this reason Enrique Casorzo assumed the club presidency for the second time. In 1956, Universidad Católica, again with the reliability of Sergio Livingstone in goal and Raimundo Infante as top scorer, won the Segunda División title against Deportes La Serena, defeating them 3:2, thus returning to the Serie de Honor.

== 1960s ==
The 60s would be remembered by the Cruzado fans as a brilliant era for the club, due to the good play and quality shown by its teams. As a good omen of the campaigns to come, László Kubala visited Chile and reinforced the Cruzado team in the 1:0 victory over River Plate on December 19, 1960. That same year, it also received a special distinction when Universidad Católica appeared in a comic adaptation facing Barrabases, the protagonist team of the eponymous magazine created by Guido Vallejos. The result was 3:3 in a thrilling match. On March 4, 1967, the first Copa Libertadores match between Católica and one of its rivals, Colo Colo, took place. The result favored the Cruzados 5:2. The following year it defeated Universidad de Chile in the 1968 Pre-Libertadores Qualifier. During this decade, Universidad Católica played three Copa Libertadores semi-finals: 1962, 1966, 1969.

=== 1961 National Championship winner ===
1961 Primera División de Chile

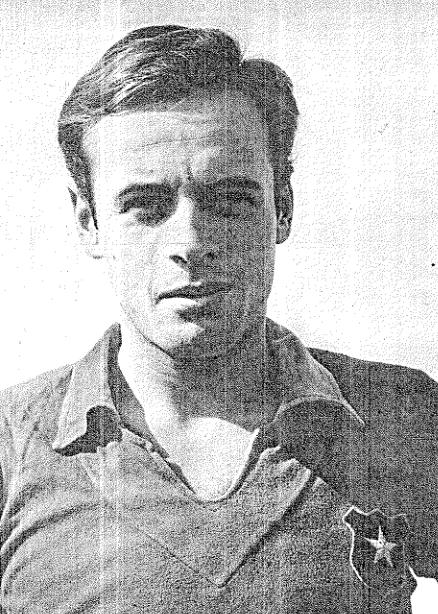
Alberto Fouillioux champion in 1961 and 1966.

Universidad Católica was crowned champion again in 1961, in an exciting final against Universidad de Chile, with a team led by debutant coach Miguel Mocciola. Both teams reached the final matchday tied on 38 points and although the goal difference favored Universidad Católica (+34 against +27 of its rival), it was necessary to decide the title in two matches, with La Franja proving superior by drawing 1:1 in the first leg and winning 3:2 in the return leg. In 1962, Católica qualified for the Copa Libertadores de América for the first time, thus initiating a successful history for the club internationally.

Subsequently, Universidad Católica performed very well nationally, competing neck and neck with the Ballet Azul of Universidad de Chile.

=== 1966 National Championship winner ===
1966 Primera División de Chile

In 1966, with players such as Alberto Fouillioux, Leopoldo Vallejos, Ignacio Prieto, Julio Gallardo, Washington Villarroel, Armando Tobar, Juan Barrales and Néstor Isella, the club clinched its fourth professional title, pulling away from Colo-Colo and Santiago Wanderers, teams against which it remained undefeated during the competition: It defeated Colo-Colo 2-0 and 3-1, and beat Wanderers 2-0, drawing 0-0 against them in the second round. On January 4, 1967, in the match corresponding to the third-to-last round of the 1966 Primera División de Chile, the Cruzado team defeated Unión San Felipe 4:2 away and took a victory lap at the Estadio Municipal. Despite having Washington Villarroel and Eleodoro Barrientos sent off, Católica achieved its objective.

== 1970s: Second institutional decline ==
The good years of Universidad Católica at the national level were beginning to end. The club began to accumulate debt, which led to an economic crisis within the institution. The precarious financial situation began to affect its football branch, which at the start of the 70s began to distance itself from the leading positions in the local tournament. The team's sole triumphs came in non-competitive matches, highlighted by a 3-1 victory against Colo-Colo in the final of the 1972 Santiago Four-Team Tournament.

=== Relegation and 1975 Segunda División title ===
1975 Segunda División de Chile

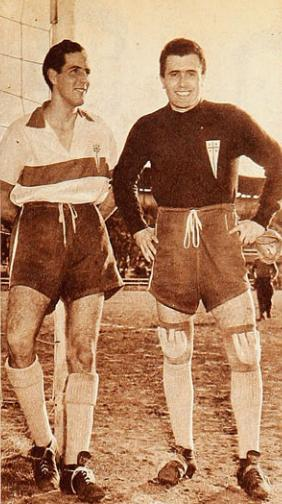
Jorge Luco, standing to the left of goalkeeper Krebs, was a two-time champion as a player in 1954 and 1961. As a coach, he led the team that won promotion in 1975.

In 1973, Católica was relegated to the Segunda División. The Estadio Independencia, owned by the club, had to be demolished. The leadership was divided on how to act during this complicated time. It was the most difficult period in the institution's history.

In 1975, under the guidance of coach Jorge Luco, who had won championships as a player in the 1954, 1956 B and 1961 seasons, Universidad Católica was crowned champion of the Segunda División thanks to figures like Alberto Fouillioux, Oscar Wirth, Gustavo Moscoso and Eduardo Bonvallet. During that campaign, the club attracted over forty thousand spectators, with many more attending the matches. With a record of 30 matches played, 18 wins, 9 draws and three losses, 64 goals scored and 22 conceded, the club finished its promotion campaign in first place with a 4-point lead over Deportes Ovalle. Universidad Católica and Ovalle drew 1:1 in the first round and in the return match the score was 1:0 in favor of the Cruzado team.

Its return to the Serie de Honor would ultimately be permanent. In the following years, Católica had performances very far from those of the previous decade, such as in the 1977 season, where it finished in 14th place in the standings. However, the directors were preparing to restore the club's institutional and sporting strength. In 1978, Germán Mayo became president and quickly started working on a long-held dream since the closure of Independencia: building the club's own stadium. Thus, the foundations were laid for what is today the San Carlos de Apoquindo.

== 1980s: Sporting rebirth ==
At the youth level, the eighties began for Universidad Católica with the triumph in the Croix International Under-19 Tournament, an achievement that would lead to more titles at the professional level. In the national tournament, the club was crowned champion in 1984 and 1987, in addition to winning the 1983 Copa de la República, 1983 Copa Polla Gol and the Liguilla Pre-Libertadores of 1989.

In 1982, Alfonso Swett took on the role of club president. The efforts to restore Universidad Católica's place of honor in Chilean football bore fruit. The club overcame the financial crisis, and the team won two trophies in 1983. Another historic event of this decade was September 4, 1988—remembered by the fans as the day the Estadio San Carlos de Apoquindo was inaugurated.

=== 1983 Copa Polla Gol and Copa República winner ===
1983 Copa Polla Gol

1983 Copa República

In 1983, for the edition of the 1983 Copa Polla Gol, Universidad Católica was part of the North Group during the first phase of the competition, finishing first in the group with 10 wins, 5 draws and 3 losses in 18 matches. In the second phase, it finished first with 5 wins out of 6 matches played, defeating Palestino, Colo-Colo and Magallanes in its group. After winning the second phase, Católica qualified for the final playoff, where it faced O'Higgins, Palestino and Cobreloa. UC was crowned champion after defeating Palestino 2-1 in the final playoff. With the title obtained, Católica qualified for the 1984 Copa Libertadores.

The final of the Copa República, or Copa de la República, as it was officially called, was played between Universidad Católica and Deportes Naval on Wednesday, March 7, 1984. The decisive goal by Juan Ramón Isasi came from a play involving Jorge Aravena and Pablo Yoma that culminated with a diving header from the Paraguayan forward. Other notable performances in the team were those of captain Miguel Ángel Neira, Patricio Mardones and Osvaldo Hurtado. After winning this trophy, an article in the newspaper La Tercera nicknamed Universidad Católica the King of Cups, because it had recently won the Copa Chile and was also preparing for its participation in the Copa Libertadores, where it would reach the semi-final. Several footballers who would later stand out in the senior team emerged from that squad, including Juvenal Olmos, Pablo Yoma, Fernando Díaz and Atilio Marchioni. The work of Alberto Fouillioux and Ignacio Prieto in the youth categories, followed by Fernando Carvallo, was crucial to the sporting recovery of that period.

=== 1984 National Championship winner ===
1984 Primera División de Chile

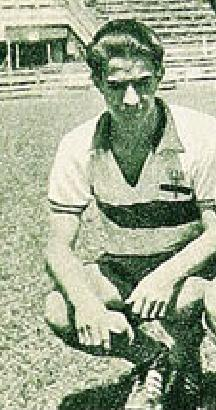
Ignacio Prieto, pictured here as the 1961 Youth Champion, was the team's coach for the 1984 and 1987 titles.

In the 1984 Copa Libertadores, the club reached the fourth semi-final in its history. Its participation began in Group 2 alongside Blooming, Bolívar and O'Higgins. After winning the group with 4 victories, one draw and one defeat, earning one point more than Blooming, it did not achieve any wins in the next phase against Nacional and Independiente, and was eliminated with one point from three matches. The return match against Nacional in Santiago was not played. The following year, Católica won the 1985 Liguilla Pre-Libertadores after a 2:1 victory over Rangers. The club's performance in 1986 was subpar, as reflected in its sixth-place finish in the official championship.

After a good campaign, the team, then coached by Ignacio Prieto, won the Official Tournament title after an 18-year drought. In the formation, whose core was constituted by the champions of the 1980 Croix International Tournament under the charge of Prieto himself and Alberto Fouillioux, players like Marco Antonio Cornez, René Valenzuela, Miguel Ángel Neira, Rubén Espinoza, Juvenal Olmos, Mario Lepe, Patricio Mardones and Osvaldo Hurtado shone, but the figure of Jorge "Mortero" Aravena particularly stood out. Highlights of the campaign included the 6:0 thrashing of Green Cross on July 20 and the 6:1 win over Audax Italiano on December 2, in addition to the 3:2 victory in the Clásico Universitario on October 20, 1984.

=== Sixth national title and national tour ===
1987 Primera División de Chile

In mid-1987, the club embarked on a tour of Central America during the break for the 1987 FIFA World Youth Championship. On this tour, it defeated Liga Alajuelense, Municipal and Real España, and also drew with Marathón.

Results obtained

Opponent	Result
Liga Alajuelense	3:2
Municipal	3:1
Real España	1:0
Marathón	0:0

Returning from the tour and resuming its campaign in the 1987 Primera División de Chile, Universidad Católica became champion in campaigns under the technical direction of Ignacio Prieto. The team never relinquished the lead, thanks to the determination of players like Osvaldo Hurtado, Mario Lepe, Patricio Mardones, Rubén Espinoza, Marco Antonio Cornez, Pablo Yoma, Miguel Ángel Neira, and Juvenal Olmos, who were also present for the 1984 title, as well as Raimundo Tupper. The '87 title holds a special place in the collective memory of fans due to the campaign of the team and the caliber of its players. For its overwhelming style and execution of football, the team would be nicknamed La Máquina or Aplanadora Cruzada in various publications. The 1987 Clásicos Universitarios constitute undeniable testimony to the team's strength. They played five matches (four official and one friendly), with three Cruzado wins and two draws.

September 4, 1988 is remembered among the fans as the day of the inauguration of the Estadio San Carlos de Apoquindo (1:0 defeat to River Plate). Another notable event of that season was the consolidation of talents such as Luka Tudor, Fabián Estay and Raimundo Tupper. However, fourth place in the national championship paled in comparison to the previous year's brilliant season. That same year it defeated Universidad de Chile 3:2 in the Clásico Universitario of the parallel league. In 1989, Católica fought for the title until the final rounds and then won the Liguilla Pre-Libertadores by beating Cobreloa 4:1.

== 1990s: International finals ==
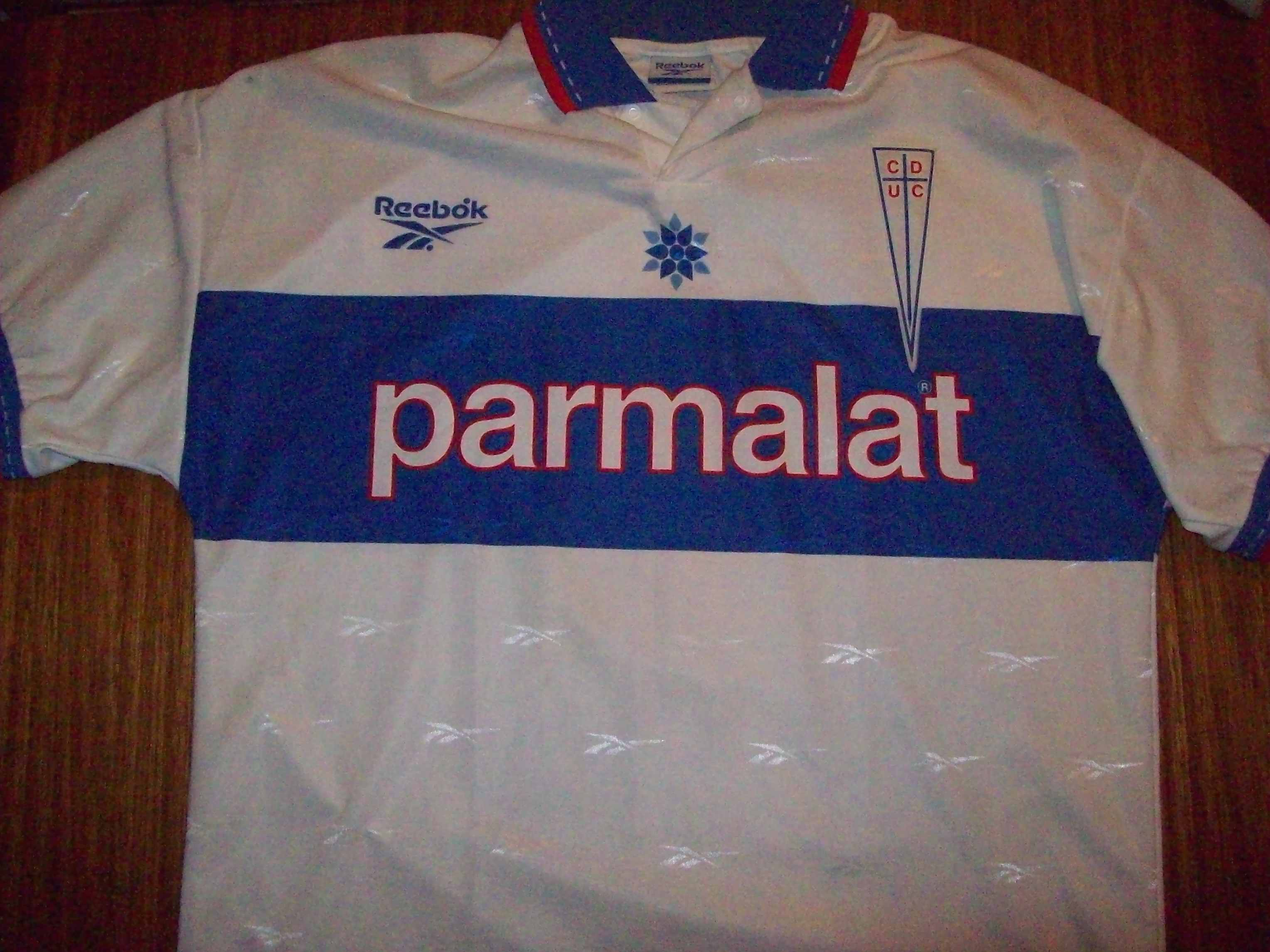
Universidad Católica kit from the late 90s.

During the 1990s, Universidad Católica was crowned champion of the Copa Chile twice, in 1991 and 1995, won the 1997 Torneo Apertura after a decade, in addition to the Liguilla Pre-Libertadores in 1991, 1992, 1994, 1995, 1996 and 1998. Internationally, it was the runner-up in the 1993 Copa Libertadores and the champion of the 1993 Copa Interamericana. Its power during those years was evident in its ranking: 18th and 21st in the world in 1993 and 1995, respectively, according to the IFFHS. On a new tour to Spain, it won the 1993 Teide Trophy.

In administrative terms, there were relevant changes; the presidency of Alfonso Swett, which had begun in 1982, ended at the close of 1993, followed by a restructuring commanded by the incoming board which involved the departure of coach Ignacio Prieto, despite his recent international campaign and various titles at the club. 1994 began with Jorge Claro at the helm of the institution and Manuel Pellegrini in charge of the squad, amidst great excitement surrounding the signing of exceptional players like Alberto Acosta and Néstor Gorosito. Claro was succeeded by Manuel Vélez (in his second term), and in 1999 Jorge O'Ryan assumed the club presidency, remaining in that position until 2009.

=== 1991 Copa Chile winner ===
1991 Copa Chile

In the first phase of the 1991 Copa Chile, Universidad Católica, under the technical direction of Vicente Cantatore, was placed in Group C alongside Unión Española, Soinca Bata, Universidad de Chile, Cobreandino, and Unión San Felipe. After two rounds, the cruzados became the group leaders with eight wins in ten matches, one draw, and one defeat. Notable in this first part of the campaign were the victories in both Clásicos Universitarios by scores of 3–2 and 3–0. In the round of 16, Católica eliminated Soinca Bata after a 2–2 draw away and a 4–0 victory at the Estadio San Carlos de Apoquindo. José Percudani and Jorge Contreras each scored a goal in both matches. In the quarter-finals, the opponent was Unión Española. The matches ended in 1–1 and 0–0 draws, results that favored Católica due to the away goals rule. In the semi-finals, Católica again drew both matches, this time against Palestino, with the same scoreline: 1–1. The tie was settled with a penalty shootout, which Católica won 4–3, following a missed shot by Lester Lacroix and a save by Patricio Toledo against Víctor Hugo Castañeda.

In the final, Universidad Católica would face Cobreloa in a single match. Cobreloa was a team with players like Mario Osbén, Juan Covarrubias, and Marco Antonio Figueroa. Meanwhile, the Franja squad reached this stage with a very young roster, reinforced by other more experienced players such as the aforementioned Patricio Toledo and José Del Solar—both selected for the South American Dream Team that year—Mario Lepe, Nelson Parraguez, as well as Leonel Contreras, José Percudani, Jorge Contreras, Andrés Romero, Rodrigo Barrera, and Raimundo Tupper. They were joined by the promising talents Miguel Ponce, Adolfo Ovalle, Ricardo Monje, and Ian Mac-Niven. Gerardo Reinoso had been fundamental in the campaign but was absent for the final match. The decisive match on 13 November 1991, played at the Estadio Nacional, was won by the cruzados with a goal from Argentine José Percudani in the 28th minute. Universidad Católica celebrated its first cup title of the 1990s.

=== First International Final: 1993 Copa Libertadores ===
Universidad Católica qualified for the 1993 Copa Libertadores after winning the Pre-Liguilla and 1992 Liguilla Pre-Libertadores under the technical direction of Ignacio Prieto, in his second spell in charge of the team. In the continental tournament, Católica was placed in a group with Cobreloa, the other Chilean representative, and two Bolivian clubs: San José and Bolívar. After a 1–1 draw in Calama and a 3–1 defeat to Bolívar away, Católica improved its performance and emerged as the top team in the group. They defeated San José 5–2 in Oruro, drew 1–1 again with Cobreloa, and achieved definitive triumphs over San José and Bolívar in Santiago, by scores of 4–1 and 3–0 respectively. In the tournament's second stage, the cruzados faced Atlético Nacional of Colombia; after defeating them 2–0 in Santiago, they lost 2–1 in Medellín but advanced to the next round. In the quarter-finals, their opponent was Barcelona of Guayaquil, whom they defeated 3–1 at the San Carlos de Apoquindo, with a goal from Sergio Vázquez from a free-kick in the final minutes. In the return leg, played in stifling heat at the Estadio Monumental Isidro Romero, Universidad Católica defeated Barcelona 1–0 with a goal from Andrés Romero.

Their opponent in the semi-finals of the 1993 Copa Libertadores was América de Cali, a team whose ranks included Harold Lozano, Freddy Rincón, and Antony de Ávila. The first leg was played at the Estadio Nacional due to a spectator capacity requirement imposed by CONMEBOL. Católica won 1–0 with a goal from Ricardo Lunari. The return leg was played at the Estadio Pascual Guerrero. Within the first fifteen minutes, América de Cali had a 2–0 lead over the Chilean team. Showing immense courage, Universidad Católica, after a goal from Juan Carlos Almada, equalized the aggregate score just minutes from the end with a goal from Ricardo Lunari. Deep into stoppage time, Uruguayan referee Ernesto Filippi awarded a penalty to América de Cali. However, Oscar Wirth, Universidad Católica's goalkeeper, saved the spot-kick, preserving the 2–2 score and securing the cruzados' place in the first international final in their history. Católica was the first Chilean team to reach a Copa Libertadores final as an away team in a two-leg format (Unión Española had done so in the group semi-finals format).

The final opponent in the competition was São Paulo of Brazil, the defending champion which had entered the tournament in the round of 16. Universidad Católica's extremely offensive scheme proved advantageous for the Brazilian team in the first leg played at the Estadio Morumbi. The final score of 5–1 in favor of the hosts ultimately decided the tie. In the return leg, held at the Estadio Nacional, Universidad Católica defeated São Paulo 2–0 with goals from Juan Carlos Almada, the top scorer of the 1993 Copa Libertadores, and Ricardo Lunari. The superiority displayed in the match was not enough to overcome the deficit, but over 50,000 spectators gave the cruzados a standing ovation for their effort.

=== First international title: Católica wins the Inter-American Cup ===
1994 Interamerican Cup

The year 1994 kicked off with a announcement from the CDUC Board of Directors, sending ripples through the national market. With the clear objective of transforming the first team into a protagonist in the league and the Copa Libertadores, they signed two new team players from a football powerhouse. These figures were Néstor Raúl Gorosito and Alberto Acosta. With the contribution of these players, Católica became a candidate for the title in 1994 and 1995.

During the season, Universidad Católica qualified for the final of the Interamerican Cup, an official competition organized by CONMEBOL and CONCACAF. Brazilian club São Paulo, which had already refused to contest the trophy as the reigning champion of the 1992 Copa Libertadores against Mexican club América, champion of the 1992 CONCACAF Champions' Cup, declined to compete in the final again as the winners of the 1993 Copa Libertadores, against Deportivo Saprissa of Costa Rica. Due to the greater number of matches and revenue from their ongoing competition, the Brazilian club preferred to play the Copa CONMEBOL, whose first round, on 1 and 11 November, coincided with the Interamerican Cup return leg. Consequently, endorsed by CONMEBOL, CONCACAF, and Saprissa itself—which would otherwise forfeit the Interamerican Cup without playing the final—Universidad Católica legitimately qualified for the 1993 Interamerican Cup as the runner-up of the 1993 Copa Libertadores, a campaign achieved under the management of coach Ignacio Prieto.

Thanks to the great campaign of the team coached by Ignacio Prieto in the 1993 Copa Libertadores, on 1 November of the following year the cruzados, then managed by Manuel Pellegrini, celebrated their win in the 1993 Interamerican Cup, to this day the club's only international title. In the first leg of the Interamerican Cup, played at the Estadio Ricardo Saprissa in San Juan, Deportivo Saprissa of Costa Rica won 3–1, with Argentine defender Sergio Vázquez scoring the consolation goal for the Franja. On 1 November 1994, in the return leg held at the Estadio San Carlos de Apoquindo in Santiago, Chile, the cruzados, then managed by Manuel Pellegrini, won by the same scoreline in regulation time with goals from Andrés Romero, Alberto Acosta, and Juvenal Olmos in the final minute of stoppage time. It was necessary to decide the trophy in extra time. During this period, goals from Miguel Ardiman and Rodrigo Barrera gave the home team the lead. Thus, Universidad Católica achieved the first international title in its history, highlighted by the South American Football Confederation in its summaries of the club's history.

"It is a great achievement for the club and brings prestige to the country." Ricardo Abumohor, President of the National Association of Professional Football.

During that same season, they won the 1994 Liguilla Pre-Libertadores after a 3–3 draw with O'Higgins. The following year, they were crowned champion of the 1995 Copa Chile and defeated Colo-Colo 2–1 in the final of the 1995 Liguilla Pre-Libertadores. Their performance in those years is evidenced by their world ranking of 18th in 1993 and 21st in 1995, according to the IFFHS ranking.

=== 1995 Copa Chile Champion ===
1995 Copa Chile

In 1995, they were again crowned champion of the 1995 Copa Chile and defeated Colo-Colo for the second consecutive year in the final of the Liguilla Pre-Libertadores. Their performance in those years is evidenced by their world ranking of 18th in 1993 and 21st in 1995, according to the IFFHS ranking.

After defeating Universidad de Chile 2–1 and 5–2 in the semi-finals, Universidad Católica won the 1996 Liguilla Pre-Libertadores against Cobreloa in a penalty shoot-out, as both the first and second legs ended with a score of 3–2 for each team.

=== 1997 Apertura Tournament Champion ===
1997 Apertura Tournament

In 1997, the cruzados finally secured their 7th star. The team coached by Fernando Carvallo was crowned champion of the 1997 Apertura Tournament in a close race against Colo-Colo. In the first leg, Católica lost 1–0, then won 3–0 in the second leg on 10 July 1997 at the Estadio Nacional, with goals from Alberto Acosta, David Bisconti, and Ricardo Lunari. Among the players, figures such as Alberto Acosta, Ricardo Lunari, Mario Lepe, Nelson Parraguez, Catê, David Bisconti, Alejandro Osorio, Nelson Tapia, among others, stood out.

Universidad Católica remained undefeated at San Carlos de Apoquindo in first-division national tournaments for over 5 years, from a 0–1 defeat to Cobresal on 20 September 1992, until 18 October 1997. On that day, the cruzados suffered a decisive 0–4 loss to Audax Italiano.

On 23 December 1998, Universidad Católica defeated Universidad de Chile in a penalty shoot-out in the final of the 1998 Liguilla Pre-Libertadores.

== 2000s: The O'Ryan Era and the Arrival of Cruzados SADP ==
During the 2000s, Universidad Católica was crowned national champion twice, in the 2002 Apertura and 2005 Clausura tournaments, in addition to winning the 2003 Liguilla Pre-Sudamericana. In administrative terms, on 29 September 2009, Jorge O'Ryan announced Cruzados SADP, a concessionary company that would assume the commercial and financial rights of Universidad Católica's professional and youth football for forty years, through a renewable agreement.

=== 2002 Apertura Tournament Champion ===
2002 Apertura Tournament

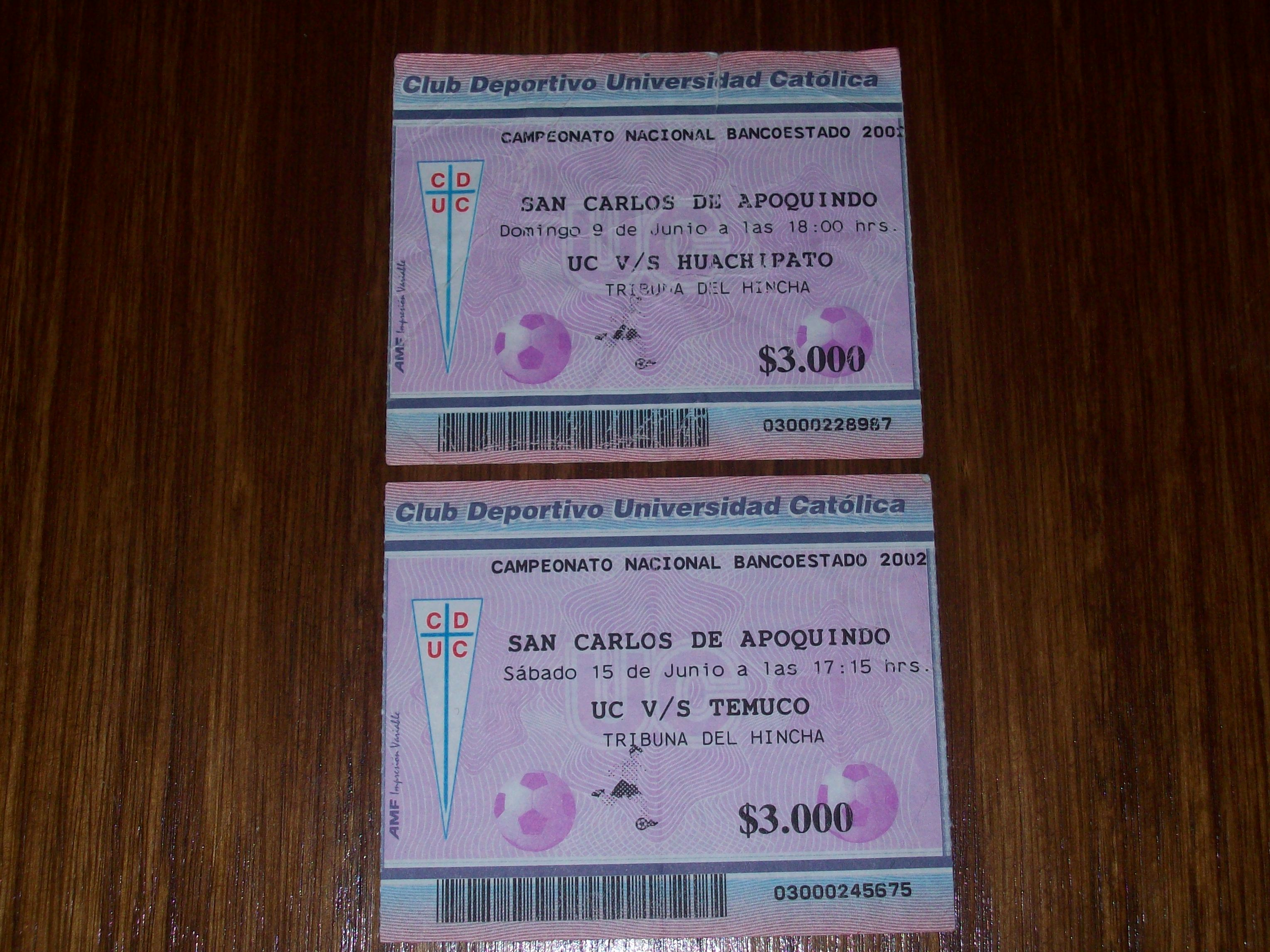
Tickets for the home matches against Huachipato and Temuco in the 2002 Apertura Tournament.

In 2001, Juvenal Olmos arrived as coach of the Católica first team. He instilled an offensive football vision in the team, thanks to which they conquered the title of the 2002 Apertura Tournament. Highlights of the campaign included the 3–1 victory over Colo-Colo on the 2nd matchday of the regular phase, a match played on 24 February 2002; a 7–0 win against Cobresal on the 10th matchday corresponding to 21 April; and a 5–0 victory over Coquimbo Unido on the 12th matchday played on 4 May. In the playoffs, they defeated Huachipato with a 4–1 aggregate score and a golden goal by Iván Gabrich, then Temuco with a 3–2 aggregate, and in the semi-finals, they ended the aspirations of Universidad de Chile with a 5–4 aggregate score (3–3 in the first leg and 2–1 in the second leg).

Finally, after a 1–1 draw in the first leg of the final, they were crowned champion after defeating Rangers de Talca 4–0 in the second leg at the San Carlos de Apoquindo. Players who stood out in this team included Milovan Mirosevic, Miguel Ramírez, Cristián Álvarez, Pablo Lenci, Patricio Ormazábal, Jorge Campos, among others. In 2002, Universidad Católica eliminated its arch-rival Universidad de Chile in both semi-finals (Apertura and Clausura). With qualification for the Copa Libertadores secured as the first champion of the season, they subsequently finished as runners-up in the 2002 Clausura Tournament, losing the final to Colo-Colo. Juvenal Olmos left the cruzados to manage the Chilean National Team.

During the 2000s, Universidad Católica achieved its first victory in Brazil in the Copa Libertadores, a 3–1 win over Flamengo on 14 February 2002. The following year, they won the 2003 Liguilla Pre-Sudamericana alongside Provincial Osorno.

=== 2005 Clausura Tournament Champion ===
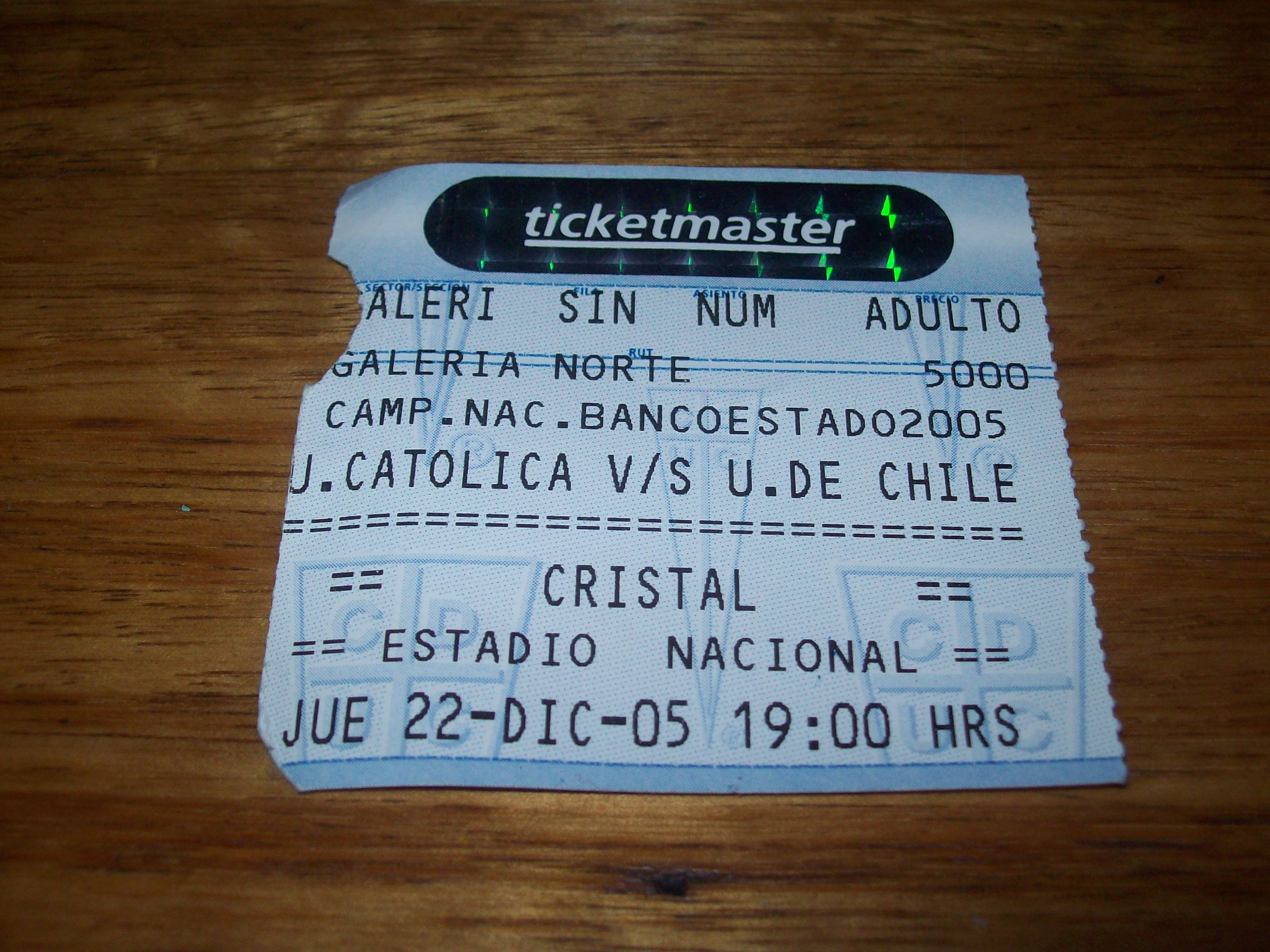
Ticket for the second leg final between Universidad Católica and Universidad de Chile for the 2005 Clausura Tournament.

2005 Clausura Tournament

After a serious footballing crisis in 2004, which triggered the departure of coach Oscar Garré, Jorge Pellicer took charge of the team. Universidad Católica was by far the best team of the 2005 season, but the playoff championship system prevented UC from winning the 2005 Apertura Tournament title, which went to Unión Española. Additionally, Católica reached the semi-finals of the 2005 Copa Sudamericana, losing to Boca Juniors after a 2–2 draw in the first leg at La Bombonera and a 0–1 home defeat in the second leg at San Carlos de Apoquindo. As in the 2002 season, Universidad Católica displayed the Chilean coat of arms on its jersey in 2006 as the defending champion.

Universidad Católica had an outstanding campaign in the 2005 Clausura Tournament, starting with the Qualifying Round, which they won undefeated, with 15 wins and four draws. Their first opponent in the playoffs was Cobreloa, whom they defeated with a 3–2 aggregate score. In the semi-final, Deportes La Serena put up strong resistance in both legs, but the tie favored the cruzados with a 4–3 aggregate. The first leg of the final, played between Universidad Católica and Universidad de Chile on 18 December 2005, was won by Católica with a goal from Eduardo Rubio. On 22 December 2005, after a 2–1 defeat in regulation time and a 2–2 aggregate, Universidad Católica won the championship title in a penalty shoot-out against its arch-rival. The team's standout players were goalkeeper José María Buljubasich, who kept a clean sheet for 1,352 minutes during the tournament, Darío Conca, who was chosen as the best number 10 of the championship, and the starting forwards, Eduardo Rubio and Jorge Quinteros. The team's top scorer was Luis Ignacio Quinteros, with 10 goals.

Following the departure of Jorge Pellicer from the cruzados bench at the end of 2006, he was succeeded by Peruvian coach José Guillermo Del Solar, under whom the club finished as runners-up in the 2007 Apertura Tournament and qualified for the 2008 Copa Libertadores. In mid-2007, Del Solar resigned to manage the Peruvian National Team, shortly after leading the cruzados to win the friendly Copa Exmex trophy in Lima, and Fernando Carvallo took over as replacement, in his third spell in charge of the first team. Finally, after being eliminated in the first round of the 2008 Copa Libertadores with figures like Darío Bottinelli and Gary Medel, an irregular campaign in the 2008 Clausura, and reaching the round of 16 of the 2008 Copa Sudamericana with Milovan Mirosevic returning to the team, Carvallo resigned and was temporarily replaced by Mario Lepe. The team was eliminated in the quarter-finals of the playoffs, so Lepe left the first team and returned to the club's youth section. On 11 December 2008, the board confirmed the arrival of Marco Antonio Figueroa as the new team coach for the 2009 season.

=== Cruzados SADP ===
On 29 September 2009, Jorge O'Ryan announced a significant transformation in the football branch of the club with the creation of Cruzados SADP, a concessionary company that would assume the commercial and financial rights of Universidad Católica's professional and youth football for forty years, through a renewable agreement. On December 4 of that year, Cruzados SADP traded thirty million shares of the initial offering, plus an additional ten million shares (equaling 80% ownership), on the Santiago Stock Exchange. This marked the beginning of a new era for the club.

== 2010s: The first national double ==
During the 2010s, Universidad Católica was crowned champion five times in the Chilean Primera División: the 2010 season, 2016 (Clausura), 2016 (Apertura), 2018, and 2019; won one Copa Chile in 2011; and two Supercopa de Chile, in the 2016 and 2019 editions. With its 2019 title and impressive performance throughout the decade (629 points in 339 matches), Universidad Católica solidified its status as the best Chilean team of the decade. With the victory in the 2019 Supercopa de Chile, the Franja team secured its fifth title in the last three years.

In 2011, the club became the team that has played the most matches in the history of Chilean football in a calendar year across national and international competitions, with 72 official matches: Apertura Tournament (23 matches), Clausura Tournament (21 matches), 2011 Copa Chile (12 matches), 2011 Copa Libertadores (10 matches), 2011 Copa Sudamericana (6 matches). During 2012, it played all possible tournaments for a Primera División team, finishing 5th overall in the domestic league and reaching the semi-finals of the Copa Sudamericana.

=== Bicentennial Champion ===
2010 Primera División

Although initially planned as a short tournament, the earthquake that struck Chile on 27 February 2010 caused a change in the competition format of the Primera División. Finally, a two-round, all-play-all tournament was held, a system that had not been used since the 2001 season. On 7 July 2010, the board of Cruzados SADP sidelined coach Marco Antonio Figueroa. Three days later, on 10 July 2010, former Argentine footballer, naturalized Spanish, Juan Antonio Pizzi was confirmed as the new coach. Due to its popular support in a vote for an initiative by the Municipality of Santiago, the Universidad Católica jersey was preserved in the Bicentennial Time Capsule on 28 September 2010.

In the context of the national tournament, Universidad Católica demonstrated great courage and soccer talent, becoming a well-deserved champion. With few rounds remaining until the end of the tournament, Colo-Colo, their direct rival in the title race, held a comfortable 7-point lead, but Católica managed to overcome the difference, highlighted by victories over Universidad de Chile 4–2 and Cobreloa in Calama 3–2 with a last-gasp goal from Juan Eluchans. The championship celebration took place at the Estadio San Carlos de Apoquindo on 5 December of that year, after Universidad Católica defeated Everton 5–0, thus securing its tenth star in official tournaments. It was the first Chilean team to win the Huemul de Plata and was also designated as the Bicentennial Champion. Milovan Mirosevic spent the most minutes on the pitch during the season (2,627 in 31 matches), followed by Rodrigo Valenzuela (2,367 in 27 matches) and Jorge Ormeño (2,124 in 26 matches). Mirosevic's importance in the Bicentennial title is further demonstrated by his winning of the ANFP Golden Boot as the tournament's top scorer, with 19 goals. Other notable figures were Roberto Gutiérrez, Francisco Silva, and Darío Bottinelli. A poll conducted by Radio Cooperativa showed that 72% of respondents believed Universidad Católica was a deserving champion.

=== 2011 Copa Chile Champion ===
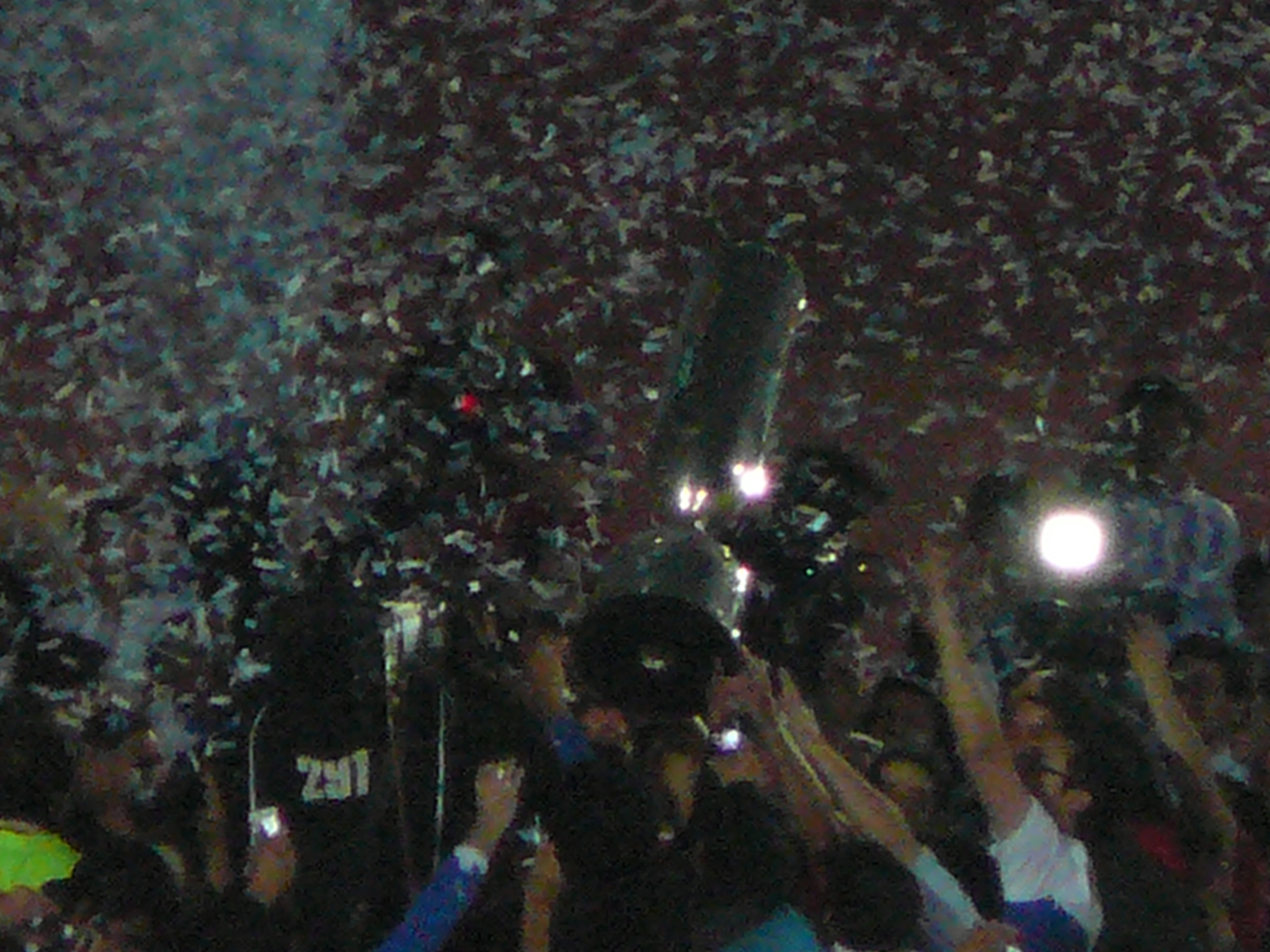
Universidad Católica won the 2011 Copa Chile.

2011 Copa Chile

Universidad Católica entered the 2011 Copa Chile tournament in the third phase due to its status as a Primera División team. In that round, they faced Colo-Colo (3–0 and 0–0), Naval (2–0 and 2–0), and Ñublense (0–0 and 1–0). In the quarter-finals, Universidad Católica eliminated Audax Italiano after winning 2–0, losing 1–3, and winning the penalty shoot-out 4–2. In the semi-finals, the cruzados overcame Universidad de Concepción 1–0 and 5–4, advancing to the finals. In the finals of the 2011 Copa Chile, their opponent was Magallanes. After losing the first leg 1–0 and winning the second leg by the same scoreline, the aggregate was tied 1–1 and required a penalty shoot-out; Universidad Católica won 4–2 that time, securing its fourth title in the competition and a spot in the 2012 Copa Sudamericana.

In the national league, they contested the 2011 Apertura Tournament, finishing first in the regular season. In the playoffs, they finished second after contesting the final with Universidad de Chile. The first leg was a 2–0 victory for the cruzados as visitors, and in the second leg, Universidad Católica lost 4–1 and finished with two players sent off (Tomás Costa and Alfonso Parot). As UC does not play home derbies at San Carlos, both matches were played at the Estadio Nacional, where La U acts as the home team. Following the final defeat, Juan Antonio Pizzi left Universidad Católica, being replaced by Mario Lepe, and the team reached the semi-finals of the playoffs for the 2011 Clausura Tournament.

On the international stage, the club qualified for the Copa Sudamericana by winning the regular phase of the 2011 Torneo Apertura. They subsequently lost the final to Universidad de Chile with an aggregate score of 4–3. Despite this, the SIFUP awarded them the Best Team prize at the SIFUP Football Gala.

On 3 March 2011, Universidad Católica defeated Vélez Sarsfield 4–3 in Argentina in the 2011 Copa Libertadores, marking the first time the cruzados had achieved a victory in that country. This made them the first Chilean club to secure victories in both Argentina and Brazil in the premier continental club competition. On 26 April of the same year, they won 2–1 against Grêmio away from home, securing another victory in Brazil. After overcoming Grêmio 3–1 on aggregate in the round of 16, they were eliminated in the quarter-finals by Peñarol with an aggregate score of 3–2.

=== Runner-up in the 2013 Transición Tournament and 2012-13 Copa Chile ===
After winning the 2011 Copa Chile, Mario Lepe remained as manager for the 2012 season. The team competed in the 2012 Torneo Apertura, finishing fourth in the overall standings and qualifying for the tournament playoffs. Following inconsistent performances, Lepe left the club and was replaced by Andrés Romero. In the quarter-finals, they faced Unión Española, who had finished fifth in the regular season, losing 3–0 away at the Estadio Santa Laura and drawing 1–1 at home in the second leg at the San Carlos.

In the second half of the year, the cruzados signed Uruguayan manager Martin Lasarte. In the 2012 Torneo Clausura, they finished ninth, missing out on the playoffs and qualification for international tournaments. In the 2012-13 Copa Chile, Universidad Católica faced Universidad de Chile in the final at the Estadio Germán Becker in Temuco. Católica lost 2–1, with a last-minute goal from Duma.

Under Lasarte, the team competed in the 2013 Torneo de Transición. The tournament did away with the playoffs and determined the winner based on the total points accumulated. Universidad Católica finished level on points (38) with Unión Española; however, Unión Española won the title due to a superior goal difference (20 to 17).

=== Three consecutive national runner-up finishes ===
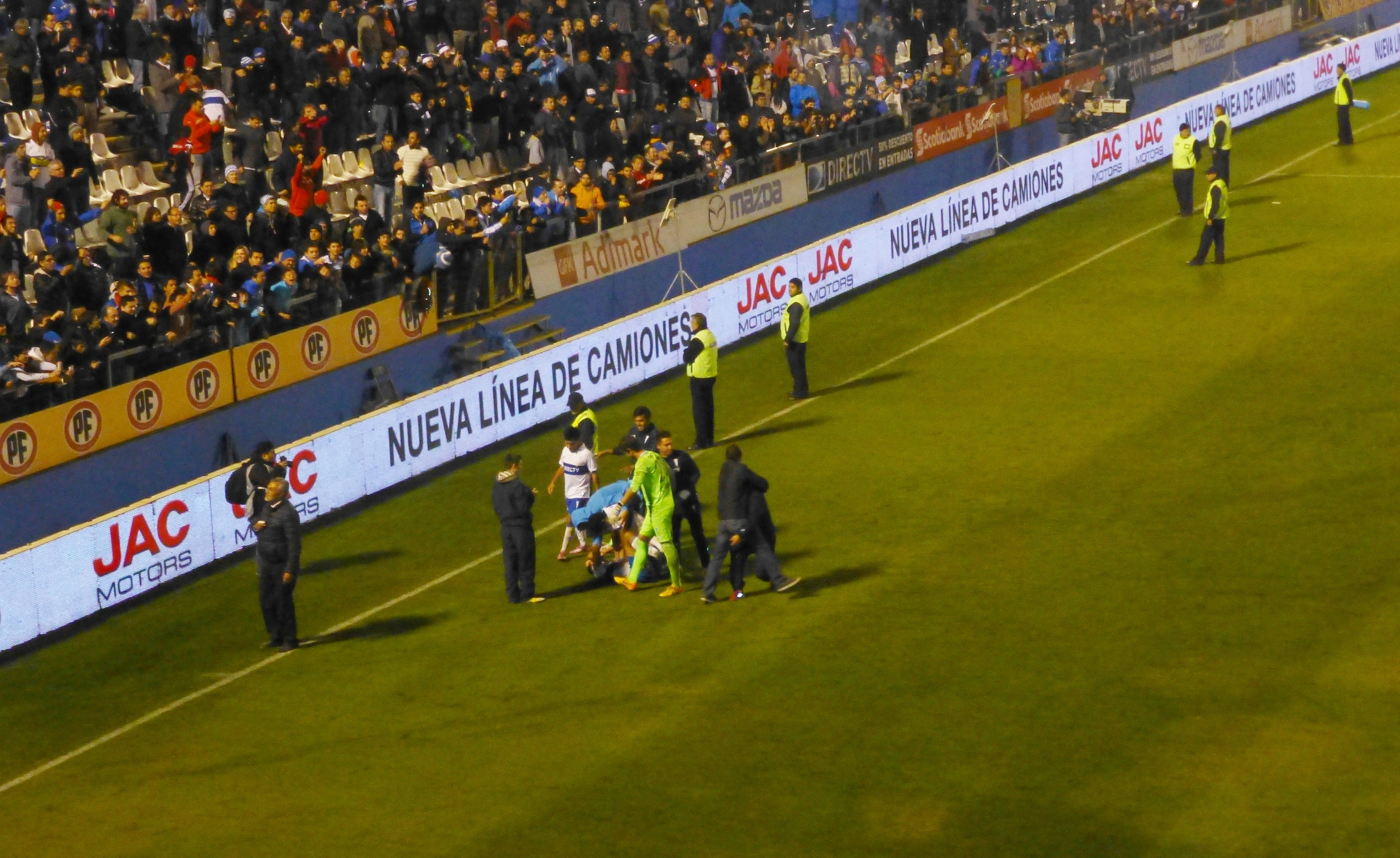
Celebrations of Universidad Católica after winning the final of the 2015 Liguilla Pre-Sudamericana or Postemporada.

After finishing second in the 2013 Transición on goal difference, and with Lasarte continuing as manager for the 2013-14 season, the club competed in the 2013 Torneo Apertura. They again finished first in the standings, level on points with O'Higgins. Despite having a better goal difference, the ANFP had changed the tie-breaking criteria at the start of the tournament, requiring a final between the two tied teams at the Estadio Nacional. In front of approximately 40,000 spectators, O'Higgins defeated Universidad Católica 1–0.

For the 2014 Torneo Clausura, UC appointed Rodrigo Astudillo as the new head coach. The team finished second in the national tournament for the third consecutive time. On 29 July 2014, Universidad Católica defeated Valencia 1–0 and won the DirecTV Trophy, awarded to the winners of their match in the Copa EuroAmericana.

For the 2014-15 season, Cruzados SADP hired Julio César Falcioni as manager. In the 2014 Torneo Apertura, Falcioni had a poor run and was dismissed after matchday 15 when UC was in 13th position; the final two games were managed on an interim basis by Patricio Ormazábal. In the Apertura, Universidad Católica finished 14th, 27 points behind the tournament champion. Following Falcioni's dismissal, Mario Salas took over. In his first tournament, the 2015 Torneo Clausura, he improved the team's performance compared to the previous campaign, finishing in fourth place with 29 points, five behind the champion. On 20 May 2015, Universidad Católica won the Liguilla Pre-Sudamericana or Postemporada of the Clausura after losing the first leg 1–3, winning the second leg by the same scoreline, and defeating San Marcos de Arica 6–5 in a penalty shootout.

=== 2016 Clausura Champion ===
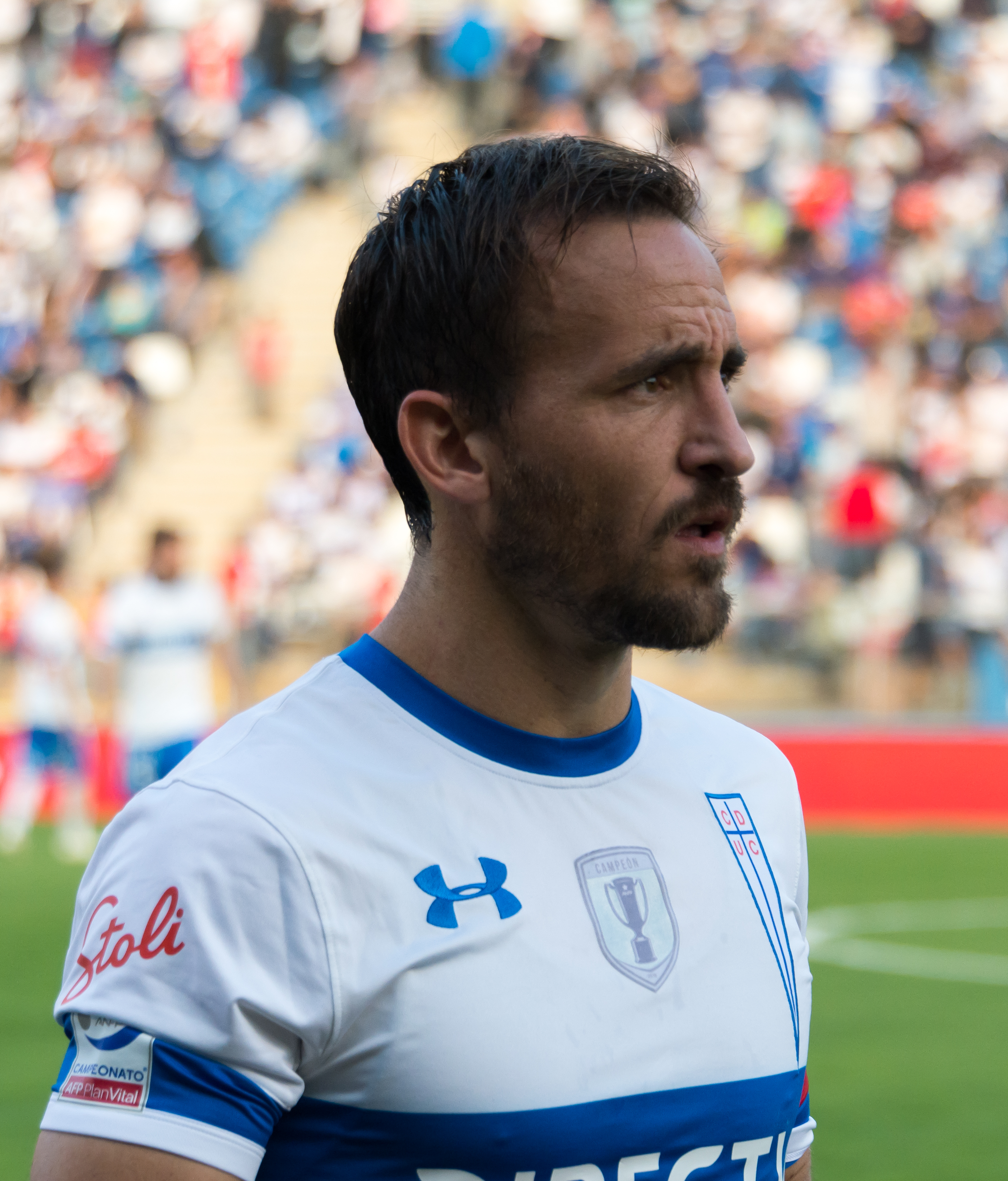
In 2016, José Pedro Fuenzalida returned to Universidad Católica after 9 years, scoring the goal that secured the 2016 Torneo Clausura title.

2016 Torneo Clausura (Chile)

The 2015 Torneo Apertura was the first competition of the 2015-16 season for Universidad Católica. Notable results included a 2–1 victory over Colo-Colo at the San Carlos de Apoquindo, with goals from David Llanos and a last-minute winner from Roberto Gutiérrez. Against Universidad de Chile, they secured a 2–2 draw at the Estadio Nacional, with both goals coming in the final minutes: Mark González from a penalty in the 82nd minute and Michael Ríos in the 89th minute. After fifteen matches with 10 wins, 2 losses, and 3 draws, UC finished second, one point behind champions Colo Colo.

On 20 December 2015, they won the Liguilla Pre-Sudamericana Apertura, defeating Palestino 4–1 at the Estadio San Carlos de Apoquindo, after having lost the first leg 2–1 at the Estadio Santa Laura.

On 17 January 2016, Universidad Católica began the 2016 Torneo Clausura with a 2–2 draw against Deportes Iquique. In the penultimate round, with three teams—Universidad Católica, O'Higgins, and Colo Colo—contending for the title, UC, who controlled their own destiny, lost 1–0 to San Luis at the Estadio Lucio Fariña. On 30 April 2016, the final matchday, Universidad Católica needed to win their match and hope that O'Higgins, who also controlled their own fate, did not win. All three title contenders played simultaneously. O'Higgins lost 1–2 to Universidad de Concepción at the El Teniente in Rancagua, Colo Colo defeated Santiago Wanderers 2–1 at the Estadio Monumental, while UC, after initially falling behind to a goal from Diego Vallejos for Audax Italiano, equalized through David Llanos in the 70th minute. With O'Higgins already losing 0–2 at halftime, UC only needed a win to become champion. In the final stages, José Pedro Fuenzalida scored the winning goal in the 86th minute. After three consecutive runner-up finishes, Universidad Católica became champions for the first time since the 2010 title, securing their eleventh star with 29 points, one more than both Colo-Colo and O'Higgins. The winning team's key players included Cristopher Toselli, Guillermo Maripán, Jaime Carreño, David Llanos, José Pedro Fuenzalida, Jeisson Vargas, and Nicolás Castillo. Over fifteen matches, the team recorded nine wins, two draws, and four losses.

=== First national double and 2016 Supercopa champion ===
2016 Supercopa de Chile

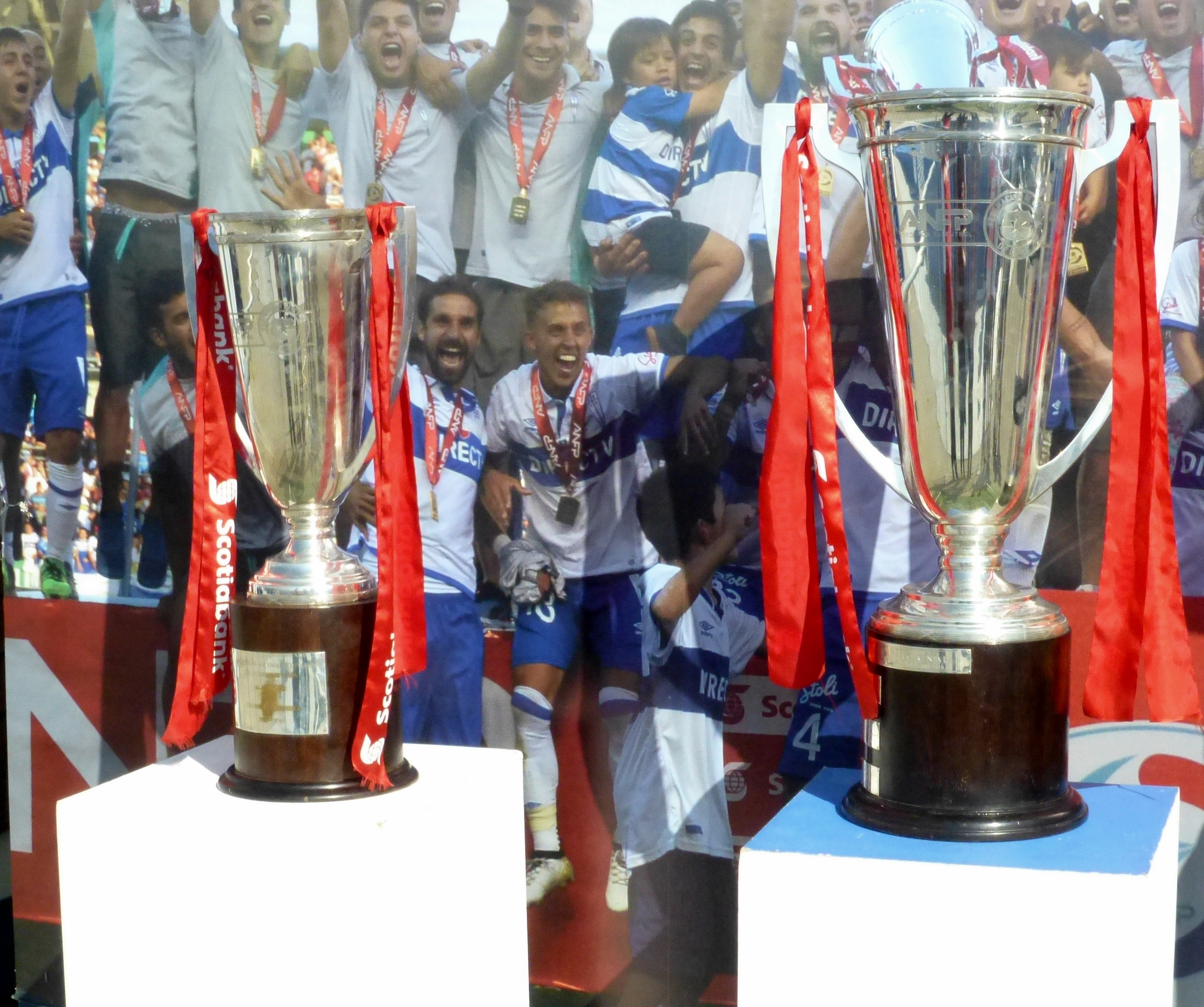
2016 Double.

2016 Torneo Apertura (Chile)

On 15 September 2016, as the best-performing champion of the 2015-2016 season, Universidad Católica faced Universidad de Chile, the reigning Copa Chile champion, for the Supercopa de Chile. The match was played at the Estadio Ester Roa Rebolledo in Concepción. With goals from Nicolás Castillo and José Pedro Fuenzalida, the cruzados defeated their rivals 2–1 to become the super champions of Chilean football. This victory increased their lead to 13–6 in decisive matches against Universidad de Chile.

Following their Torneo Clausura title, Universidad Católica began their title defense in the 2016 Torneo Apertura on 30 July 2016, drawing 1–1 with Cobresal, with Kalinski scoring for the cruzados. In the Clásicos, Católica defeated Universidad de Chile 3–0 away at the Estadio Nacional, with all goals coming in the first half: an own goal by Jara, followed by a goal from Buonanotte and a penalty from Castillo. They drew 2–2 with Colo-Colo in the eleventh round at San Carlos de Apoquindo.

On December 4, 2016, in the second to last round, Universidad Católica faced Deportes Iquique, who were trailing by three points. The match, played at the Cavancha, ended in a 6–2 victory for the Franja, featuring four goals from Nicolás Castillo and a brace from Diego Buonanotte. In the final round of the Apertura, they defeated Deportes Temuco 2–0 at the Estadio Germán Becker, with both goals scored by Nicolás Castillo. On 8 December 2016, Universidad Católica secured their twelfth star and the first double in their history in Primera División tournaments. Over fifteen matches, they recorded nine wins, four draws, and two losses. Key players in the double-winning team included Cristopher Toselli, Guillermo Maripán, Alfonso Parot, César Fuentes, Enzo Kalinski, Diego Buonanotte, Ricardo Noir; José Pedro Fuenzalida and the aforementioned Nicolás Castillo, who was the tournament's top scorer for the second consecutive semester.

=== An inconsistent season and runner-up in the 2017 Supercopa ===
After finishing fourth in the 2017 Torneo Clausura, Mario Salas continued as manager for the 2017 Torneo de Transición. On 23 July 2017, the final of the 2017 Supercopa was played at the Estadio Nacional Julio Martínez Prádanos in Santiago. Universidad Católica, as champions of the 2016 Torneo Apertura and the best-placed team in the season's aggregate table, faced Colo-Colo, the reigning champions of the 2016 Copa Chile. The match ended 4–1 in favor of the albos. Although the cruzados started well with a goal from youngster Benjamín Kuscevic, Colo-Colo came back with goals from Esteban Paredes (2), Andrés Vilches, and Jaime Valdés (the latter from a penalty).

In the Torneo de Transición, Universidad Católica's performance was far below their previous season's standards, suffering home defeats to both Colo Colo and Universidad de Chile at San Carlos de Apoquindo, both by 1–0 scorelines. The team finished in 11th place, recording only 4 wins, 4 draws, and 7 losses in 15 matches for a total of 15 points, far behind leaders Colo-Colo who had 33. Following this poor domestic campaign, an early elimination in the round of 16 of the Copa Chile, and failure to qualify for international competitions for the next season, Mario Salas announced on Thursday, 30 November 2017, that the concessionaire company Cruzados SADP had decided to terminate his contract.

=== 2018 National Championship ===
2018 Chilean Primera División

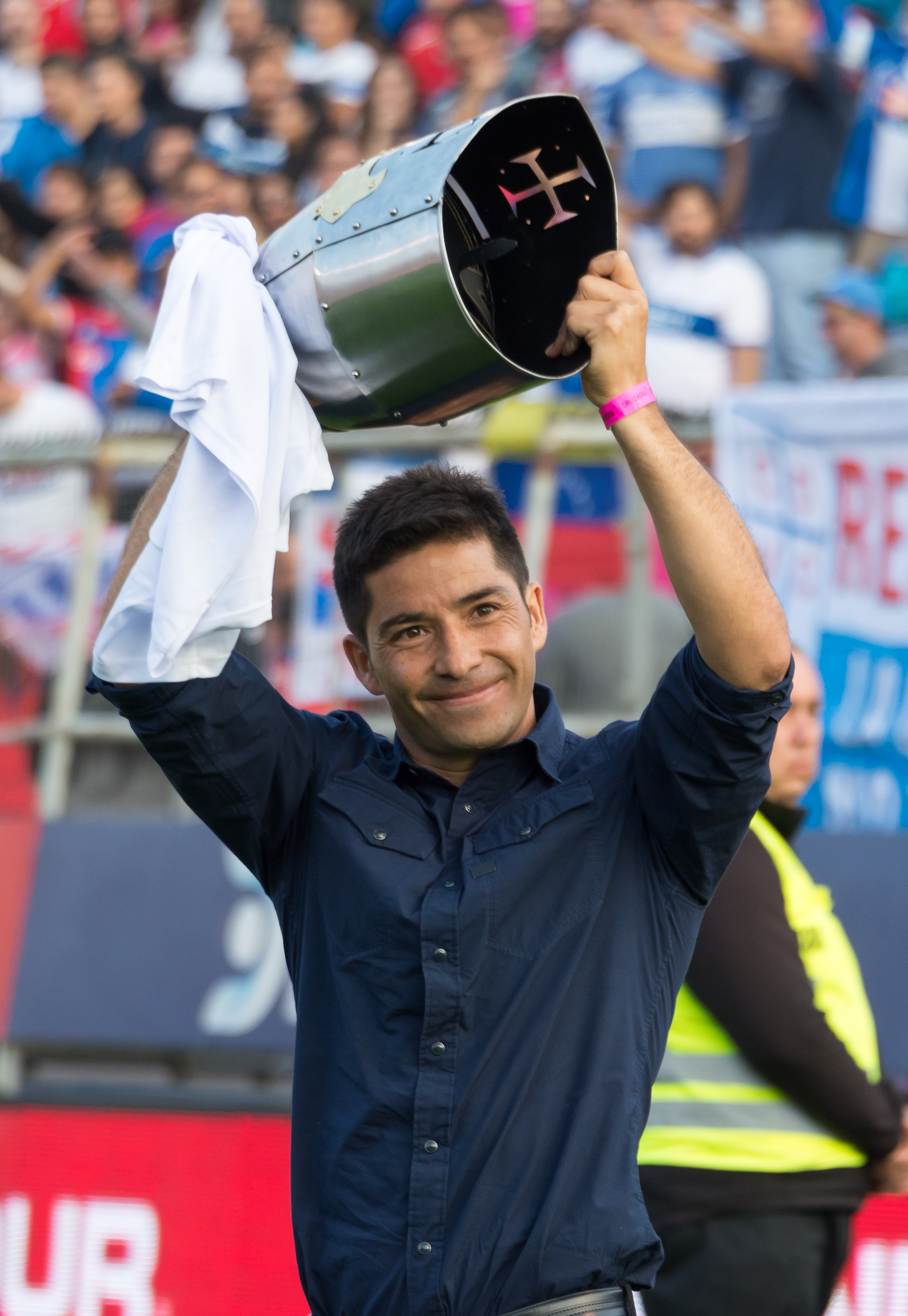
In 2018, after winning the national tournament, captain Cristián Álvarez officially retired from professional football.

On 21 December 2017, Beñat San José was announced as the new manager of Universidad Católica by the concessionaire Cruzados SADP. On 30 September 2018, Universidad Católica defeated Colo-Colo 1–0 with a 55th-minute penalty from Luciano Aued. On 20 October 2018, in the 26th round of the championship, the cruzados faced their closest challengers, Universidad de Concepción, defeating them 1–0 at the Estadio San Carlos de Apoquindo in front of 12,249 spectators. During the match, José Pedro Fuenzalida suffered a head cut in the 35th minute but continued playing until the end despite bleeding. The winning goal was scored by Andrés Vilches in the 63rd minute. The home team was able to maintain the lead thanks to a key save by goalkeeper Matías Dituro on a shot by Luis Pedro Figueroa.

On 2 December 2018, Universidad Católica entered the final round with a 3-point lead over Universidad de Concepción. Their opponent was Deportes Temuco, a team fighting relegation, at the Estadio Germán Becker. The match was fiercely contested, and a heavy foul by Mathias Riquero resulted in an injury to young star Ignacio Saavedra. Riquero was sent off, leaving Temuco with ten men after just 6 minutes. The hosts took the lead against the run of play when Matías Donoso scored from a penalty in the 14th minute. Universidad Católica fought back for the equalizer. In the 53rd minute, Jaime Carreño made it 1–1 with a powerful right-footed shot. In the 68th minute, Andrés Vilches scored the 2–1 winner for the cruzados, sparking celebrations for the champion team.

The champion's campaign consisted of 17 wins, 10 draws, and 3 losses, with 39 goals scored and 25 conceded. The cruzados' celebration was massive, not only at the Germán Becker but also at the traditional gathering point of Plaza Italia and other locations across Chile. Key figures in the championship team included Matias Dituro, Germán Lanaro, Benjamin Kuscevic, Luciano Aued, Ignacio Saavedra, José Pedro Fuenzalida, and Diego Buonanotte. The championship also served as a triumphant farewell for Cristian Álvarez. With their thirteenth star obtained in 2018, Católica had won 3 of the last 5 national tournaments up to that date. On 10 December 2018, Cruzados SADP announced that Beñat San José had left his position as manager to evaluate new challenges.

=== Second national double and 2019 Supercopa champion ===
2019 Supercopa de Chile

2019 Chilean Primera División

Following the departure of Beñat San José, Gustavo Quinteros was announced as the new manager of Universidad Católica for the 2019 season on 21 December 2018. Quinteros had a winning debut in the 2019 Torneo de Verano. In the final of that competition, Universidad Católica defeated Everton 4–1. On 23 March 2019, Universidad Católica were crowned champions of the 2019 Supercopa, the club's second title in that competition. As champions of the 2018 season, they faced Palestino, the reigning Copa Chile champions. The match was played at the Estadio Sausalito in Viña del Mar. The cruzados defeated Palestino 5–0, which was the largest margin of victory in the final's history at that time. The goals for Universidad Católica were scored by Benjamín Kuscevic, César Pinares, Sebastián Sáez, Diego Valencia, and Diego Buonanotte.

On 14 April 2019, in the 8th round of the 2019 Primera División, the largest victory in the Clásico Universitario held at the San Carlos de Apoquindo took place. Universidad Católica defeated Universidad de Chile 4–0. The goals were scored by José Pedro Fuenzalida, Edson Puch, Duvier Riascos, and Luciano Aued.

On 29 November 2019, the Franja secured a new double. They won their fourteenth Primera División title, the fifth won in the decade and the eighth official trophy since 2010, including 1 Copa Chile and 2 Supercopas. The 2019 protests in Chile, known as the Revolución de los 30 pesos or Chile despertó, led the ANFP Presidents' Council to end the official tournament with six rounds remaining. Despite their 13-point lead over Colo-Colo in the standings, the club's official position was for the championship to continue so as not to gain an unfair sporting advantage. Universidad Católica's campaign was considered highly successful, with 16 wins, 5 draws, and 3 losses. Key figures in the double-winning team included José Pedro Fuenzalida, Edson Puch, Matías Dituro, César Pinares, Benjamín Kuscevic, Germán Lanaro, César Fuentes, and Luciano Aued.

== 2020s: A historic four-peat ==
During the 2020s, Universidad Católica became national champions for the first time for four consecutive seasons, winning the 2018, 2019, 2020, and 2021 titles. The Franja won two national titles (2020 and 2021) and two Supercopas (2020 and 2021). On the international stage, they drew level with Universidad de Chile in terms of victories in Argentina in CONMEBOL tournaments, with three each. Furthermore, in November 2021, they reached 28 official titles, surpassing one of their rivals, Universidad de Chile, who had 27 as of 2021.

=== First three-peat and Supercopa double ===
2020 Chilean Primera División

2020 Supercopa de Chile

On 12 December 2019, Ariel Holan was announced as the new manager of Universidad Católica for the 2020 season. On 16 February 2020, UC faced Colo-Colo in the 4th round of the national tournament. The Metropolitan Intendency did not allow away fans to prevent disturbances due to the social context the country was experiencing from the protests. The match was temporarily suspended in the 73rd minute by referee Piero Maza after hard objects and fireworks were thrown onto the pitch. It was decided to end the match with the score 0–2 in favor of UC, with goals from Aued and Pinares.

On 4 October 2020, in the 13th round of the national tournament, Universidad Católica faced Universidad de Chile at San Carlos, winning 3–0 with goals from Aued, Pinares, and Zampedri. After a strong first half of the championship with 12 wins, 3 draws, and two losses, Católica built a points advantage over their closest challengers Unión La Calera and Unión Española. Internationally, they competed in the 2020 Copa Libertadores, in which they were in the same group as Grêmio, Internacional, and América de Cali. They finished third, qualifying for the 2020 Copa Sudamericana thanks to a last-minute goal from Grêmio in another match. In the Sudamericana, they were eliminated in the quarter-finals by an aggregate score of 3–4, conceding a last-minute goal to Vélez Sarsfield.

Following their elimination from the Copa Sudamericana, Católica had a streak of draws in the national tournament, which none of their pursuers could capitalize on. On 10 February 2021, in the penultimate round, Católica faced their closest challengers, La Calera, who trailed by five points. The match ended 0–0, and Católica won the first three-peat in their history, securing their fifteenth Primera División title, and the fifth in the last seven official tournaments in Chile. They achieved this with 17 wins, 11 draws, and 5 losses. The most outstanding players of the campaign were Matías Dituro, Valber Huerta, Germán Lanaro, Ignacio Saavedra, Luciano Aued, José Pedro Fuenzalida, Gastón Lezcano, Fernando Zampedri, and Edson Puch.

After winning the Primera División title for the third consecutive time, the team's manager left the institution after completing one season with the club for the third time in a row. Holan was replaced by Uruguayan manager Gustavo Poyet. Due to delays caused by the COVID-19 pandemic, the 2020 Supercopa was played in March 2021. UC, as the reigning 2019 Primera División champion, faced the 2019 Copa Chile champion, Colo-Colo. The match was played at the Estadio Nacional in Santiago and, in Poyet's first match in charge, the cruzados were crowned champions of the 2020 Supercopa with a 4–2 victory over Colo-Colo. During the match, the albos took a 2–0 lead with goals from Iván Morales and Leonardo Gil, but the score was overturned by the cruzados with goals from Zampedri, Tapia (twice), and Marcelino Núñez.

=== Four-peat and Supercopa three-peat ===
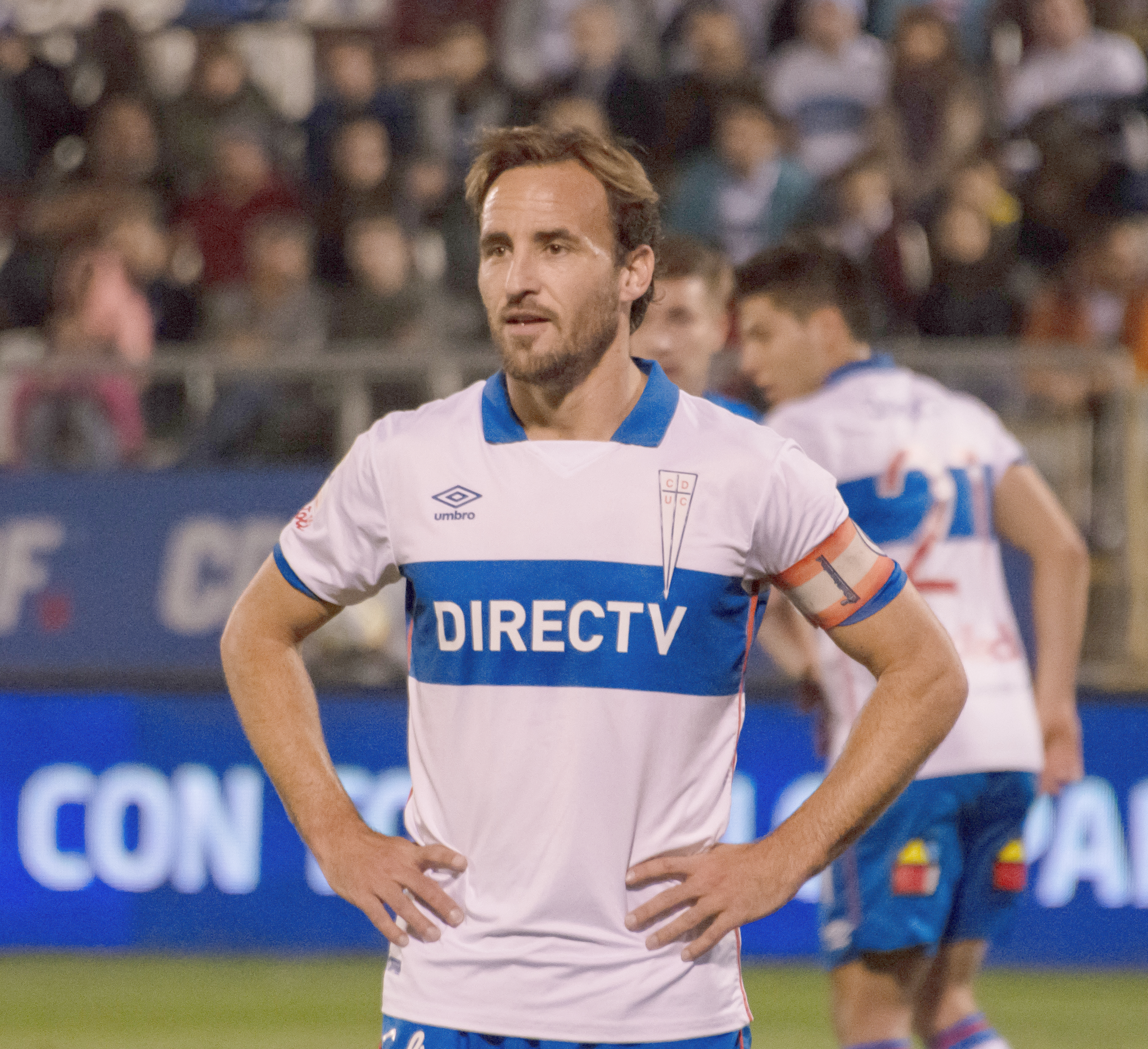
In 2021, José Pedro Fuenzalida became the player with the most titles in Universidad Católica's history.

2021 Chilean Primera División

2021 Supercopa de Chile

After playing their first match of the 2021 season (the Supercopa final), Poyet began his national league campaign with a victory over Ñublense. In the Primera División and the Copa Libertadores, Universidad Católica suffered three consecutive defeats, leading to Poyet being questioned by the fans. On the international stage, Católica defeated Argentinos Juniors 1–0 away, achieving their second victory in Copa Libertadores history on Argentine soil, after beating Vélez Sarfield 4–3 in 2011, and ended their worst winless streak abroad in the Libertadores, which had lasted 10 years and 16 days since their 26 April 2011 win against Grêmio in the round of 16 of the 2011 Copa Libertadores. In the final group stage match, UC defeated Atlético Nacional 2–0. With this victory, the cruzados qualified for the round of 16 of the Copa Libertadores, ending a 10-year drought since last reaching that stage in the 2011 edition. In the round of 16 against Palmeiras, UC were eliminated with an aggregate score of 0–2.

In domestic cups, UC competed in the 2021 Copa Chile, facing Deportes Iquique. The tie ended 4–4 on aggregate, with UC advancing 9–8 in a penalty shootout. After advancing to the round of 16, UC faced Everton, drawing 0–0 in the first leg at the Sausalito and losing the second leg 0–2, thus being eliminated from the 2021 Copa Chile after four matches without a win in the tournament. In the national tournament, compounded by the poor performance in the Copa Chile, UC lost 2–1 to Universidad de Chile, ending a three-year unbeaten run against the blue team. After a 0–3 loss to Palestino, Gustavo Poyet left the club on 30 August 2021. His record stood at 18 matches: 9 wins, 2 draws, and 7 losses, leaving the club 8 points behind league leaders Colo-Colo with 14 rounds remaining. He was replaced by his assistant Cristian Paulucci.

In the final of the 2021 Supercopa de Chile under Paulucci, Universidad Católica faced Ñublense. The match ended 1–1 after regulation time, with goals from Federico Mateos for the Chillanejos and Fernando Zampedri (via penalty) for the Franja. The title was decided by a penalty shootout, which Universidad Católica won 7–6 against Ñublense. Diego Buonanotte missed his penalty, while Marcelino Núñez, Alfonso Parot, Ignacio Saavedra, Fernando Zampedri, Tomás Asta-Buruaga, Valber Huerta, and Diego Valencia (who scored the title-winning penalty) converted for the Franja. For Ñublense, Mateos and Navarrete missed, while Rivera, Abrigo, Guerra, Vargas, Pérez, and Cerezo scored. With this title, Universidad Católica became three-time Supercopa champions. Furthermore, they surpassed one of their rivals, Universidad de Chile, in total official titles. The 2021 Supercopa was the Franja's fourth in this competition, making them the most successful club in the history of the trophy.

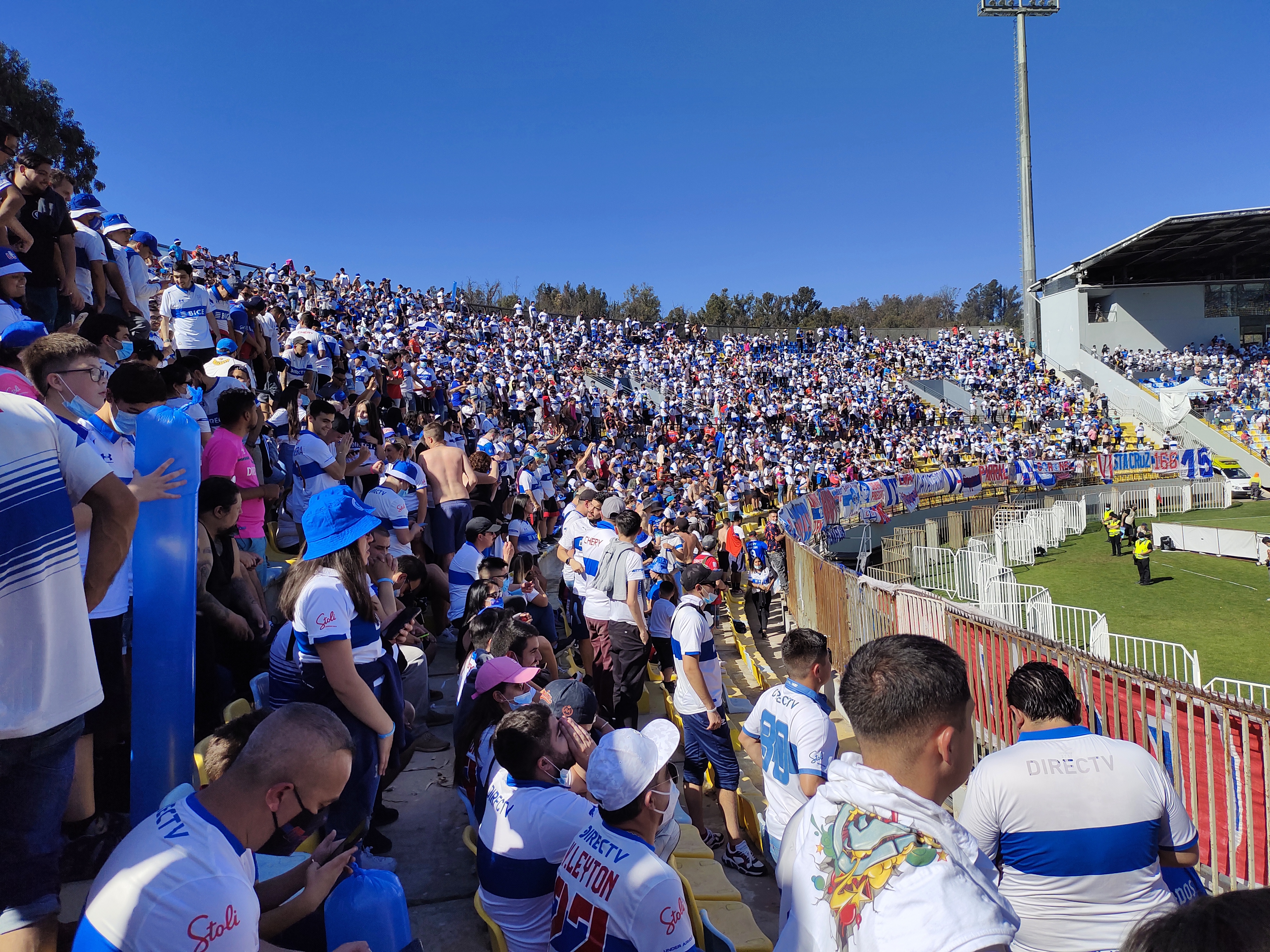
Part of the Universidad Católica supporters at the Estadio Sausalito on 4 December 2021, the day of the four-peat.

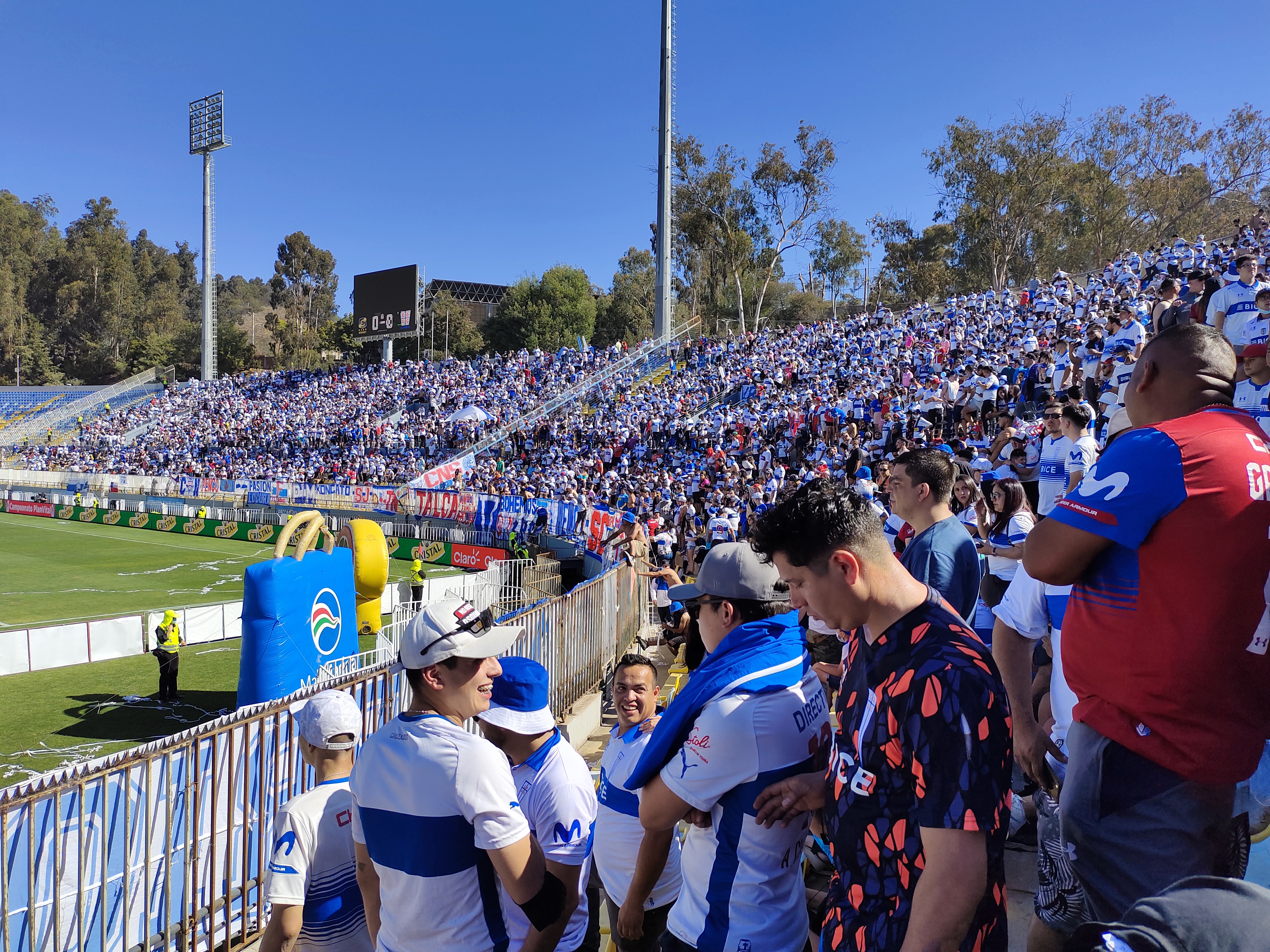
Part of the Universidad Católica supporters at the Estadio Sausalito on 4 December 2021, the day of the four-peat.

Following Poyet's dismissal, under Paulucci in the Primera División, UC recorded 7 consecutive wins, their best streak of the season. In these matches, they overcame the other two closest challengers to the leader, Audax Italiano, and Unión La Calera away, a ground where the club had not won in 36 years. Their winning streak ended with a 2–1 loss to leaders Colo Colo, conceding a last-minute goal from Parraguez. With this defeat, the albos took a 5-point lead over the cruzados with 6 rounds remaining. In the following 5 rounds, Colo only managed 7 out of 15 points, while UC won all 5 of their matches, including a victory over Universidad de Chile and, with one round remaining, became the sole leaders of the championship, 3 points ahead of the albos. In the final match, the club faced Everton at the Estadio Sausalito in Viña del Mar. The match ended 3–0 in favor of Católica with an own goal by Barroso and goals from Parot and Gutiérrez for the Franja. With this new title, UC secured their 16th star in the Primera División, crowning themselves as four-time consecutive champions, the second club to achieve this after Colo Colo in the 2006 and 2007 seasons, and the first to win four consecutive long tournaments.

=== 2022 Supercopa runner-up ===
On 23 January 2022, Universidad Católica played in the final of the 2022 Supercopa de Chile against Colo-Colo at the Ester Roa Rebolledo in Concepción. The first half ended goalless; however, in the second half, Colo Colo continued their dominance, opening the scoring through Gil in the 62nd minute, and Villanueva sealed the 2–0 victory for the Albos in the 91st minute.

In international tournaments, UC was drawn in Group H of the 2022 Copa Libertadores alongside Flamengo (Brazil), Sporting Cristal (Peru), and Talleres (C) (Argentina). They had a poor performance in the group. On the final matchday, the club could only aspire to qualify for the round of 16 of the Copa Sudamericana if they won their match. Despite this, the Franja lost at home to Talleres, but Sporting Cristal's loss to Flamengo meant UC qualified for the Sudamericana as the best third-placed team from the Copa Libertadores groups. In the Copa Sudamericana, the club faced São Paulo of Brazil. In the first leg, a match marred by three red cards for the opposition, Universidad Católica lost 4–2 at home to São Paulo. In the second leg, Universidad Católica was defeated again, 4–1, and were eliminated from the round of 16 with an aggregate score of 8–3.

Domestically, fortune was no different in the Primera División, with a terrible run of form under Cristian Paulucci, culminating in his tenure ending with 6 losses and 1 victory in his last 7 league matches. This led to the termination of Cristian Paulucci's contract by mutual agreement. The following day, his replacement was confirmed to be his technical assistant Rodrigo Valenzuela on an interim basis. After drawing 1–1 in the Clásico against Colo-Colo, the institution announced Ariel Holan as their new manager until December 2023. Under Holan, the Franja, which had remained in the bottom half of the table throughout the first semester, finished the 2022 season in seventh place, obtaining a berth for the 2023 Copa Sudamericana. In the Copa Chile, Universidad Católica faced Unión San Felipe in two-legged ties, winning with an aggregate score of 6–1. In the round of 16, they faced Audax Italiano, winning the tie 5–0 on aggregate. In the quarter-finals, UC faced their classic rivals in a tie marred by the suspension of the match due to the throwing of fireworks at Universidad de Chile's goalkeeper Martín Parra. Ultimately, UC were eliminated with an aggregate score of 2–3.

=== Inconsistent campaigns ===
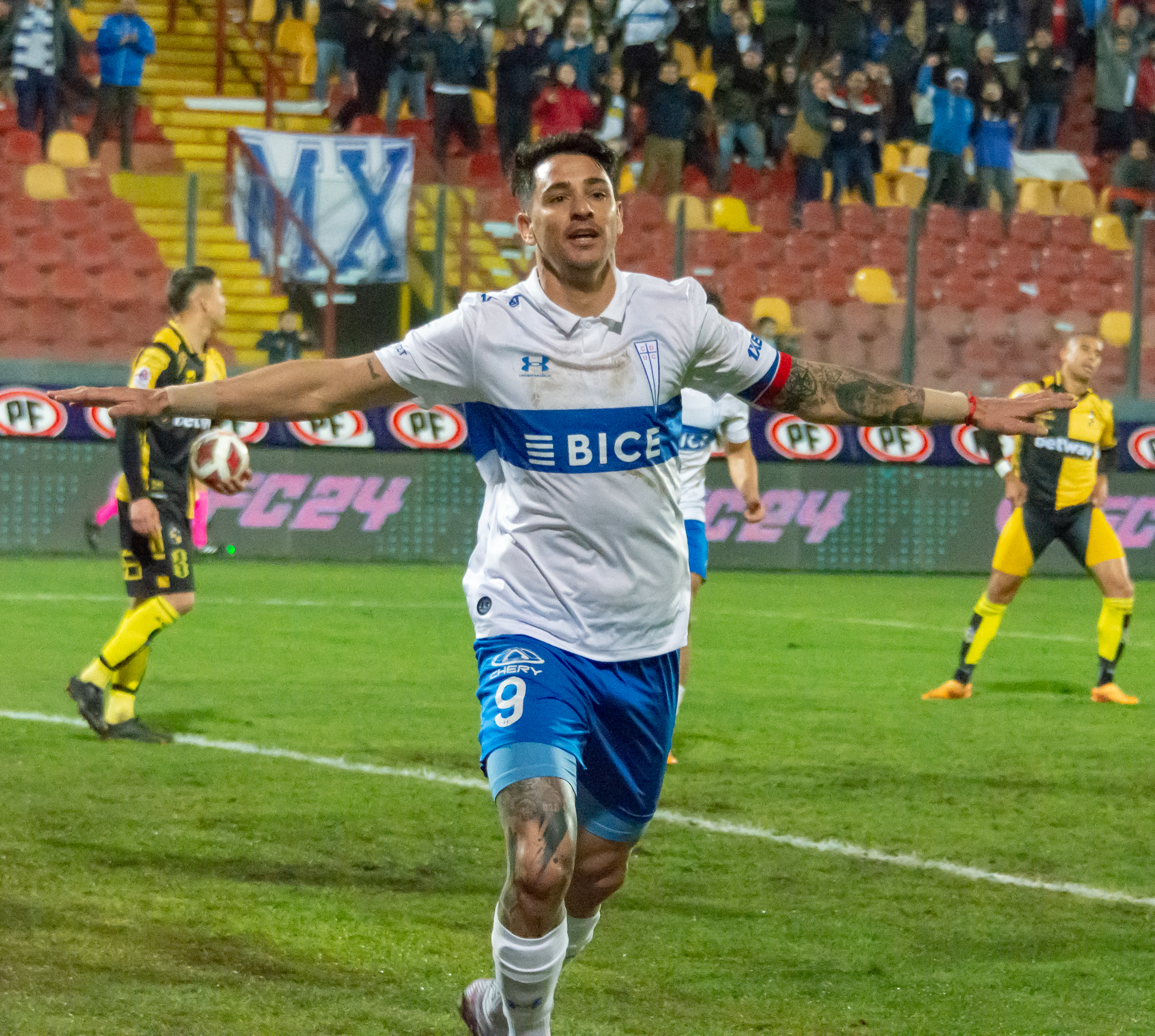
Fernando Zampedri, the club's all-time top foreign scorer.

On 22 January, the team played its first official match of the season in the national tournament, a 3–0 win over Everton, featuring the first goal for the club by Franco Di Santo and the first assist by Alexander Aravena. In the second round, Aravena scored his first goal for the Franja, opening the scoring against Curicó Unido in a match that ended 3–1 in favor of Universidad Católica. In the third round, Mauricio Isla scored his first goal, a consolation in a 2–1 loss to Coquimbo Unido. On 18 February, in a match that ended with 7 red cards, UC defeated Audax Italiano, which featured the first assists for the team by Kagelmacher and Rovira, and the first goals for the club by Cuevas and Mena, who scored the decisive 2–1 winner. In league clásicos, the club managed a draw against Colo-Colo, and after a one-month break following the first round, the club played their postponed match against Universidad de Chile, losing 3–0.

During the second round of the national tournament, Ariel Holan resigned by mutual agreement. Rodrigo Valenzuela took charge for the next match on an interim basis, winning 2–1 against Coquimbo Unido in the 18th round. After that match, Nicolás Núñez took over as the club's new manager. The club would lose again to Colo-Colo, 2–1, with two goals in the 96th and 101st minutes from Benegas and Pizarro, while Católica's goal was scored by Aravena in the 55th minute. In the Clásico Universitario, they lost again, this time 3–1. On the final matchday of the national championship, the cruzados won 3–0 against Unión La Calera with a goal from Montes and a brace from Tapia, thus finishing in seventh place and securing a berth for the 2024 Copa Sudamericana.

In the 2023 Copa Sudamericana, UC were eliminated in the first qualifying stage by Audax Italiano 3–2. In the Copa Chile, the team eliminated Deportes Colina, Santiago Wanderers, and Everton, qualifying for the national semi-finals of the Copa Chile. Their opponent was Colo-Colo. The first leg at the Santa Laura ended in a goalless draw. In the second leg at the Monumental, the Cacique won the match 1–0 with a goal from Pizarro, thus eliminating Universidad Católica from the Copa Chile.

As in the previous season, in international cups the team was eliminated in the first qualifying stage of the 2024 Sudamericana, this time by Coquimbo Unido, 2–0. Fernando Zampedri stood out this year. On May 4, 2024, the striker surpassed Néstor Isella's 105 goals, breaking the record for the club's all-time top foreign scorer, by scoring in Universidad Católica's 2–1 victory over Unión Española.

== International tours of Club Deportivo Universidad Católica ==
The international tours of Universidad Católica began in 1950. This sporting journey started on 26 March against Atlético de Madrid and concluded on 1 May of the same year against Bayern Munich. They then embarked on other trips abroad and won titles such as the 1984 Trofeo Ciudad de Palma, the 1985 Trofeo Ciudad de Alicante, the 1993 Trofeo Teide, and the 2007 Copa Exmex.

== Honours ==
Club Deportivo Universidad Católica honours
Type	Competition	Titles	Seasons
National	Primera División	16	1949, 1954, 1961, 1966, 1984, 1987, 1997-A, 2002-A, 2005-C, 2010, 2016-C, 2016-A, 2018, 2019, 2020, 2021.
National	Segunda División	2	1956, 1975.
National	Copa Chile	4	1983, 1991, 1995, 2011.
National	Supercopa de Chile	4	2016, 2019, 2020, 2021.
National	Copa República	1	1983.
International	Copa Interamericana	1	1993.

== See also ==
- List of Club Deportivo Universidad Católica seasons
- List of Club Deportivo Universidad Católica records and statistics
- Club Deportivo Universidad Católica in international football

== Bibliography ==
- Emmerich, Fernando (1993). Por la Patria, Dios y la Universidad [For the Fatherland, God and the University] (PDF). Santiago: Los Andes. OCLC 55359601.
- La Nación (1985). Historia del fútbol chileno [History of Chilean Football]. Vol. Tomo N.º 2. Santiago de Chile: La Nación.
