= 1956 Campeonato Nacional Segunda División =

Segunda División
- Season: 1956
- Champions: Universidad Católica
- Promoted: Universidad Católica; Deportes La Serena
- Relegated: None

The 1956 Segunda División de Chile was the fifth season of the Segunda División de Chile.

Universidad Católica was the tournament's winner.

== Table ==
| Pos | Team | Pld | W | D | L | GF | GA | GD | Pts | Qualification |
|---|---|---|---|---|---|---|---|---|---|---|
| 1 | La Serena (P) | 21 | 13 | 6 | 2 | 39 | 14 | +25 | 32 | Qualified for final |
| 2 | Universidad Católica (P) | 21 | 15 | 2 | 4 | 43 | 21 | +22 | 32 | Qualified for final |
| 3 | Unión La Calera | 21 | 12 | 3 | 6 | 44 | 22 | +22 | 27 | |
| 4 | Alianza de Curicó | 21 | 8 | 3 | 10 | 29 | 39 | −10 | 19 | |
| 5 | Universidad Técnica del Estado | 21 | 7 | 4 | 10 | 36 | 49 | −13 | 18 | |
| 6 | Iberia | 21 | 6 | 4 | 11 | 32 | 45 | −13 | 16 | |
| 7 | Trasandino | 21 | 5 | 5 | 11 | 25 | 35 | −10 | 15 | |
| 8 | San Bernardo Central (Note: Founded after the merger between Maestranza Central and San Bernardo Fútbol Club, both from the capital city Santiago's commune San Bernardo.) | 21 | 3 | 3 | 15 | 26 | 49 | −23 | 9 | |

(P) Promoted

== Final ==
| Universidad Católica | 3–2 | La Serena |
|---|---|---|
| Rai. Infante 15', 81'; Cisternas 41' | | Novoa 6'; Maturana 41' |

Estadio Nacional, Santiago
Attendance: 35,164

== See also ==
- Chilean football league system
