= Luis Mayanés =

Chilean footballer (1925-1979)

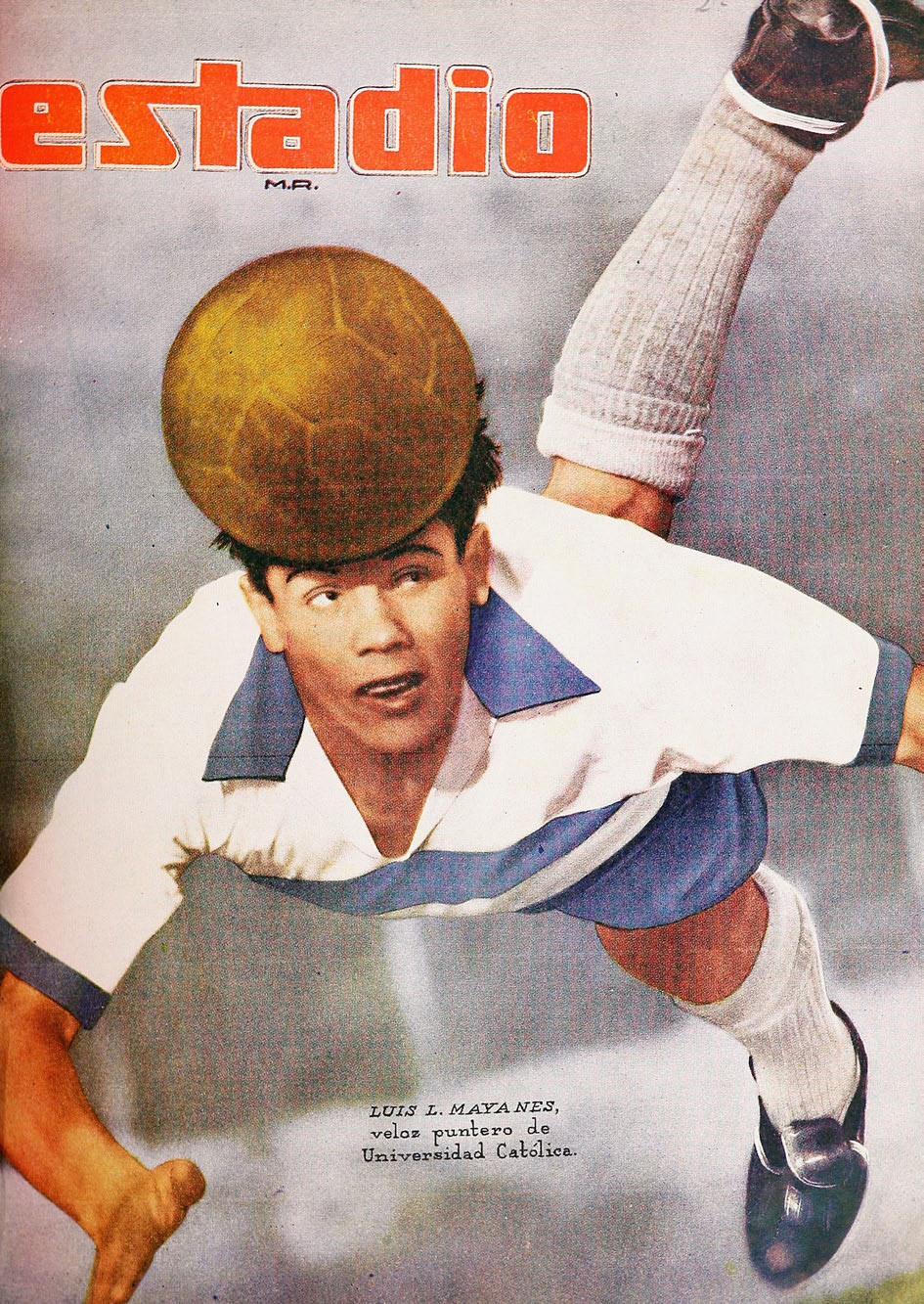

Personal information
- Full name: Luis Lindorfo Mayanés Contreras
- Date of birth: 15 January 1925
- Place of birth: Chile
- Date of death: 6 November 1979 (aged 54)
- Position: Forward

Senior career*
Years	Team	Apps	(Gls)
- Universidad Católica

International career
1950	Chile	1	(0)
- * Club domestic league appearances and goals

Luis Lindorfo Mayanés Contreras (15 January 1925 – 6 November 1979) was a Chilean football forward who played for Chile in the 1950 FIFA World Cup. He also played for Club Universidad de Chile.
