= Andrés Romero (Chilean footballer) =

Chilean footballer (born 1967)

Personal information
- Full name: Andrés Antonio Romero Samaniego
- Date of birth: 11 May 1967 (age 59)
- Place of birth: Chile
- Height: 1.75 m (5 ft 9 in)
- Position: Defender

Senior career*
Years	Team	Apps	(Gls)
1984–1997	Universidad Católica		

International career^{‡}
1990–1991	Chile	7	(0)
- * Club domestic league appearances and goals as of 8 June 2009 ‡ National team caps and goals as of 9 July 2007

Andrés Antonio Romero Samaniego (born 11 May 1967) is a Chilean retired football defender who was capped seven times for the Chile national team between 1990 and 1991. A player of Universidad Católica, he made his debut for the national squad on 8 November 1990 in a friendly against Brazil.
