= Romualdo Moro =

Uruguayan footballer (1929–2001)

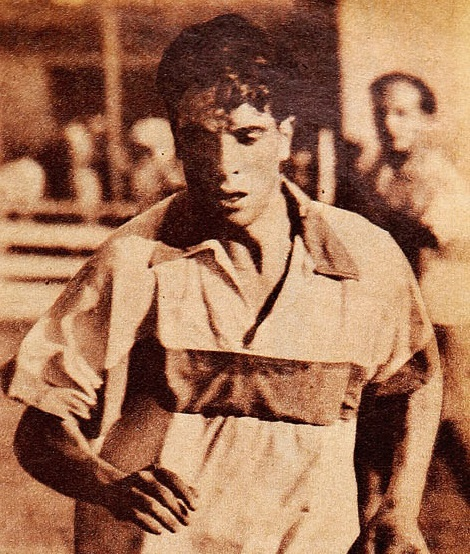
- Moro in 1955

Personal information
- Date of birth: 9 August 1929
- Place of birth: Montevideo, Uruguay
- Date of death: 19 June 2001 (aged 71)
- Place of death: Santiago, Chile
- Height: 1.74 m (5 ft 9 in)
- Position: Forward

Senior career*
Years	Team	Apps	(Gls)
1953–1956	Universidad Católica		
1956–1957	Napoli	12	(5)
- * Club domestic league appearances and goals

Romualdo Moro (9 August 1929 – 19 June 2001) was a Uruguayan footballer who played as a forward.

== Career ==
Moro played for most of his career in Universidad Católica and S.S.C. Napoli. He was part of the 1954 Universidad Católica team that won the Primera División de Chile.

== Death ==
Moro died on 19 June 2001 in Santiago, Chile.

== Honours ==
Universidad Católica

- Chilean Primera División: 1954
