= Sergio Litvak =

Chilean footballer (1927–2001)

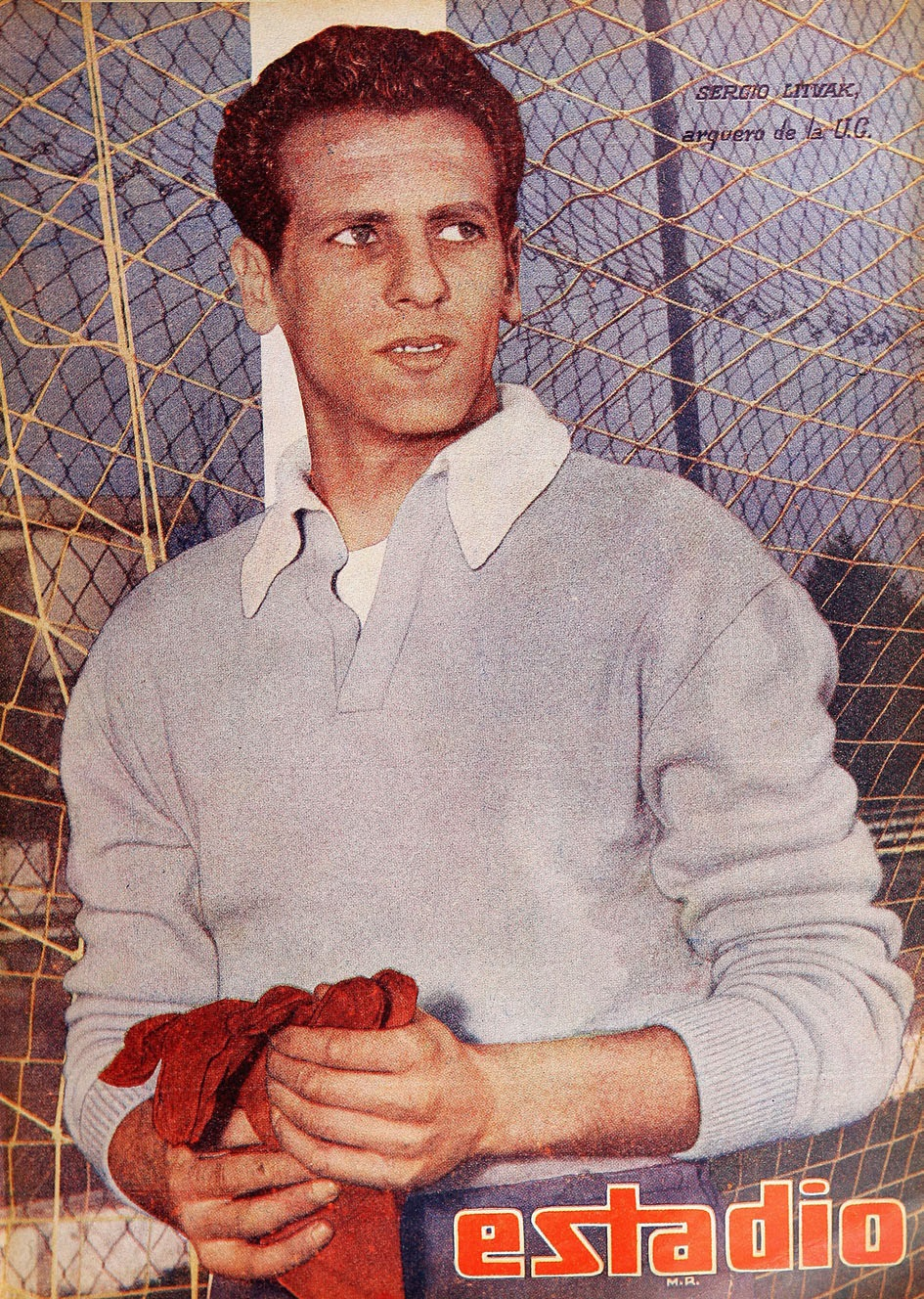

Personal information
- Full name: Sergio Litvak Lijavetzky
- Date of birth: 17 October 1927
- Date of death: 19 June 2001 (aged 73)
- Height: 1.83 m (6 ft 0 in)
- Position: Goalkeeper

Senior career*
Years	Team	Apps	(Gls)
1947–1951	Emelec		
1952–1957	Universidad Católica	49	(0)

International career
1952	Chile U23		
- * Club domestic league appearances and goals

Sergio Litvak Lijavetzky (Ukrainian: Сергій Літвяк, 17 October 1927 – 19 June 2001) was a Chilean football goalkeeper.

== Career ==
Litvak began his professional playing career in Ecuador with Club Sport Emelec in 1947. He played for Club Deportivo Universidad Católica in Chile from 1952 to 1957. Litvak was part of the side that won the 1954 Chilean Primera División and was instrumental winning in the final against Colo-Colo, making the start following an injury to regular goalkeeper Sergio Livingstone. For Universidad Católica, he made forty-nine appearances at league level.

Litvak was selected to play for Chile at the 1952 Summer Olympics in Helsinki, but did not participate in any matches.
