= Martín Parra =

Chilean footballer (born 2000)

Personal information
- Full name: Martín Cristián Alonso Parra Plaza
- Date of birth: 1 September 2000 (age 26)
- Place of birth: Talcahuano, Chile
- Height: 1.85 m (6 ft 1 in)
- Position: Goalkeeper

Team information
- Current team: Unión Española (on loan from Huachipato)
- Number: 1

Youth career
- Huachipato

Senior career*
Years	Team	Apps	(Gls)
2020–	Huachipato	30	(0)
2022	→ Universidad San Martín (loan)	9	(0)
2022	→ Universidad de Chile (loan)	2	(0)
2025–	→ Unión Española (loan)	0	(0)
- * Club domestic league appearances and goals as of 23 February 2025

Martín Cristián Alonso Parra Plaza (born 1 September 2000) is a Chilean professional footballer who plays as a goalkeeper for Chilean Primera División side Unión Española on loan from Huachipato.

== Career ==
A product of Huachipato youth system, Parra made his professional debut in the Chilean Primera División match versus Universidad de Chile on 3 April 2021, after Gabriel Castellón tested positive for COVID-19. Immediately he made an appearance for the 2021 Copa Sudamericana in the match versus Deportes Antofagasta on 6 April.

During the first half 2022, Parra was loaned to Peruvian club Universidad San Martín. In the second half of 2022, he was loaned to Universidad de Chile until December. In 2025, he was loaned out to Unión Española.
