= 1949 Campeonato Nacional Primera División =

Campeonato Nacional de Fútbol Profesional
- Dates: 28 May 1949 – 4 December 1949
- Champions: Universidad Católica (1st title)
- Matches: 132
- Goals: 510 (3.86 per match)
- Top goalscorer: Mario Lorca (20 goals)
- Biggest home win: Colo-Colo 8–1 Badminton (20 August)
- Total attendance: 1,029,266
- Average attendance: 7,797

The 1949 Campeonato Nacional de Fútbol Profesional was Chilean first tier's 17th season. Universidad Católica were the champions, winning their first ever league title.

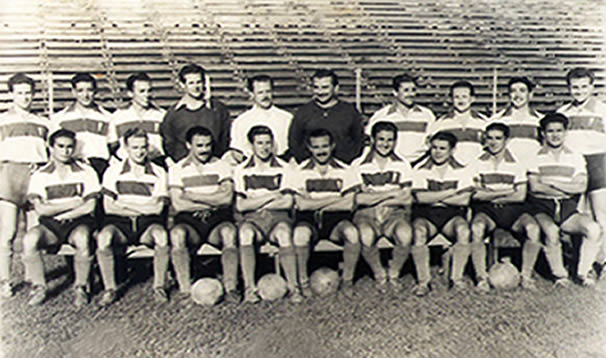
Universidad Católica's champion team in 1949

== Scores ==
	AUD	BAD	COL	EVE	GCR	IBE	MAG	SMO	UES	UCA	UCH	SWA
Audax		3–0	2–1	2–0	2–5	0–0	3–1	4–4	3–4	1–2	4–2	2–1
Badminton	1–1		3–3	0–4	1–3	0–1	0–0	2–0	2–5	2–3	2–5	1–5
Colo-Colo	2–3	8–1		0–1	3–3	0–0	1–2	1–0	3–3	0–2	3–1	1–2
Everton	0–0	3–0	2–1		5–3	3–2	3–3	1–3	1–2	0–2	1–3	2–1
Green Cross	0–1	3–2	2–3	1–3		5–1	3–1	5–2	4–3	2–3	4–4	0–2
Iberia	1–3	3–3	2–6	2–3	2–2		3–2	0–2	0–4	1–2	2–2	2–3
Magallanes	1–0	5–3	2–2	0–0	3–1	3–0		1–1	2–3	3–0	1–1	0–2
S. Morning	1–1	4–1	2–0	3–2	2–1	1–1	2–2		2–1	1–2	1–1	3–3
U. Española	2–1	2–2	2–2	1–2	1–2	3–2	1–1	2–3		2–0	1–4	1–1
U. Católica	2–3	1–0	2–0	3–2	2–1	1–1	5–3	1–0	4–1		4–1	0–0
U. de Chile	1–6	6–1	0–5	4–2	3–2	3–4	6–0	1–1	0–4	1–0		1–2
S. Wanderers	2–0	3–0	1–1	7–0	4–0	2–0	1–3	3–1	2–1	0–2	1–2	

== Standings ==
Pos	Team	Pld	W	D	L	GF	GA	GD	Pts	Qualification
1	Universidad Católica	22	16	2	4	43	25	+18	34	Champions
2	Santiago Wanderers	22	13	4	5	48	23	+25	30	
3	Audax Italiano	22	11	5	6	45	33	+12	27	
4	Santiago Morning	22	8	8	6	39	36	+3	24	
5	Unión Española	22	9	5	8	49	43	+6	23	
6	Universidad de Chile	22	9	5	8	52	51	+1	23	
7	Everton	22	10	3	9	40	43	−3	23	
8	Magallanes	22	7	8	7	39	41	−2	22	
9	Colo-Colo	22	6	7	9	46	38	+8	19	
10	Green Cross	22	8	3	11	52	53	−1	19	
11	Iberia	22	3	7	12	30	53	−23	13	
12	Badminton	22	1	5	16	27	71	−44	7	

Campeonato Profesional
1949 champions
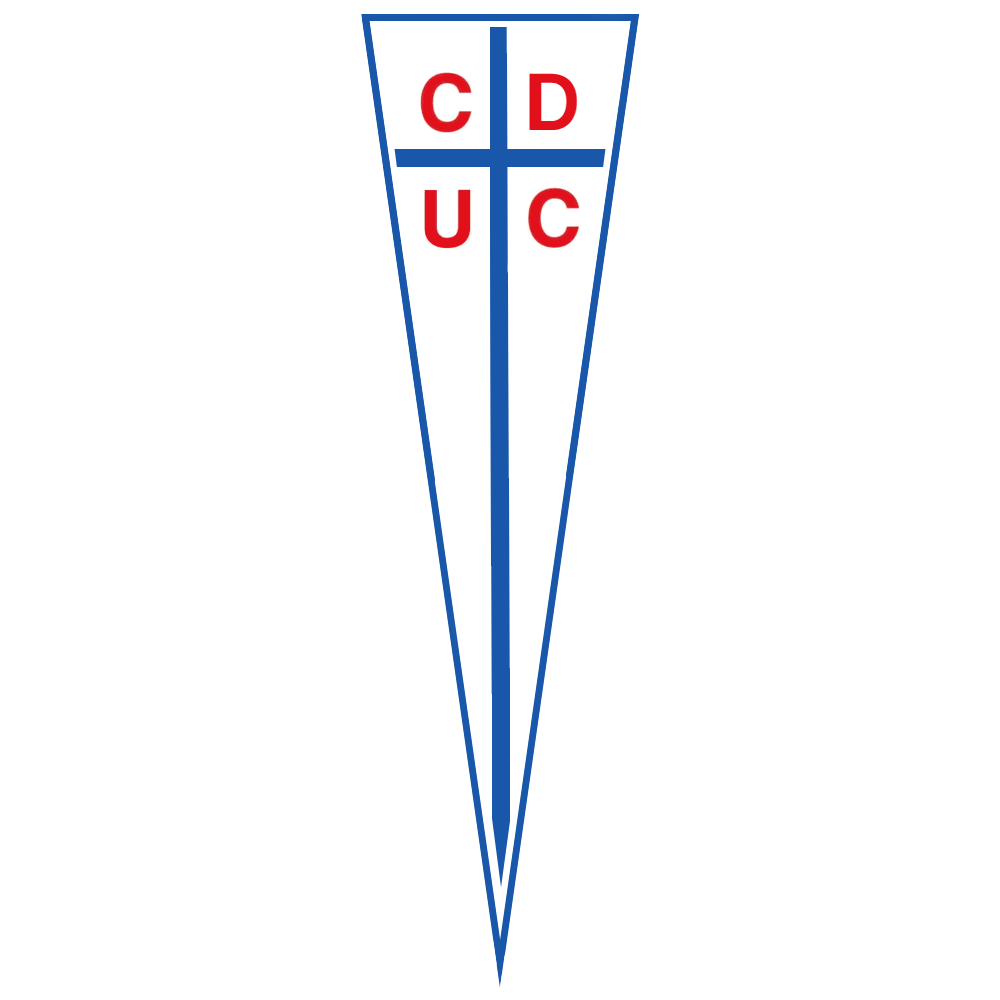
Universidad Católica
1st title

== Topscorer ==
Name	Team	Goals
(Chile) Mario Lorca	Unión Española	20
