= Raimundo Infante =

Chilean footballer (1928–1986)

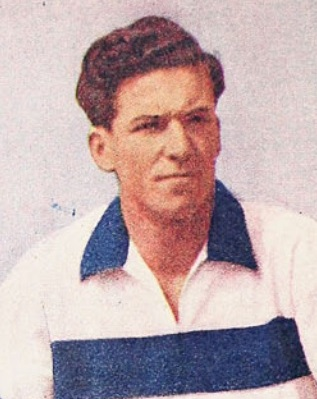

Personal information
- Full name: Raimundo Infante Rencoret
- Date of birth: 2 February 1928
- Place of birth: Santiago, Chile
- Date of death: 7 September 1986 (aged 58)
- Position: Forward

Senior career*
Years	Team	Apps	(Gls)
1946–1951	Universidad Católica		
1951	FC Rouen		
1951–1953	Universidad Católica		
1953	Deportivo Vasco		
1953–1957	Universidad Católica		

International career
1947–1950	Chile	13	(3)
- * Club domestic league appearances and goals

Raimundo Infante Rencoret (2 February 1928 – 7 September 1986) was a Chilean football forward who played for Chile in the 1950 FIFA World Cup. He also played for Club Deportivo Universidad Católica.

== Career ==
A historical player of Universidad Católica, he is one of the most prolific goalscorer in the club history with 113 goals. He also had stints in France with FC Rouen (1951) and Venezuela with Deportivo Vasco (1953).

At international level, he made 13 appearances and scored three goals for the Chile national team from 1947 to 1950.

== Personal life ==
Infante joined Club Deportivo Universidad Católica in 1946 being a student of architecture at the university of the same name.

At the same time he was a football player, he was a renowned painter who promoted the abstract art alongside fellows such as Pablo Buchard Jr., Alfonso Luco and Emilio Hermansen under the influence of Joan Miró, according to the book Historia de la pintura chilena (History of Chilean painting).

Following his retirement as a football player, he went on a career as professor.
