= List of Club Deportivo Universidad Católica seasons =

Club Deportivo Universidad Católica is a football club that plays in Chilean Primera División. The club played its first competitive match on 30 May 1937 in Chilean Serie B. Universidad Católica has won 16 Primera División titles, 2 Segunda División titles, 4 Copa Chile, 4 Supercopa de Chile, 1 Copa Apertura, 1 Copa República and 1 Copa Interamericana (1994), achieving a total of 29 titles to date.

== Key ==
Key to league:

- P = Played
- W = Games won
- D = Games drawn
- L = Games lost
- GF = Goals for
- GA = Goals against
- Pts = Points
- Pos = Final position

Key to divisions and rounds:

- C = Champions
- DSQ = Disqualified
- RU = Runners-up
- SF = Semi-finals
- QF = Quarter-finals
- R16 = Round of 16
- R32 = Round of 32
- R3 = Third Round
- R2 = Second Round
- R1 = First Round
- GS = Group stage

Key to tournaments:

- CC = Copa Chile
- CDL = Copa de la Liga
- SC = Supercopa de Chile
- CA = Campeonato de Apertura
- TCC = Torneo de Consuelo Apertura
- CR = Copa República
- CI = Copa de Invierno
- CL = Copa Libertadores
- CS = Copa Sudamericana
- CI = Copa Interamericana
- CM = Copa Mercosur

Champions	Runners-up	Top scorer in Primera División

== Seasons ==
Season	League									National Cups		CONMEBOL Cups		Top goalscorer(s)		Ref.
Season	Competition	Pld	W	D	L	GF	GA	Pts	Pos	National Cups		CONMEBOL Cups		Name(s)	League top scorer (Note: Only includes goals scored in Chilean Primera División.)	Ref.
1937	Serie B	-	-	-	-	-	-	-	3rd					—	—	
1938	Serie B	-	-	-	-	-	-	-	3rd	CA	QF			—	—	
1939	Primera División	24	10	6	8	51	51	26	4th					—	—	
1940	Primera División	18	5	4	9	34	43	14	9th	CA	SF			—	—	
1941	Primera División	18	9	0	9	40	49	18	6th	CA	R1			—	—	
1942	Primera División	18	3	4	11	19	40	10	9th	CA	R1			—	—	
1943	Primera División	18	7	5	6	37	41	19	5th					Mancilla	17	
1944	Primera División	22	11	5	6	55	46	27	5th					—	—	
1945	Primera División	22	7	7	8	45	50	21	8th					—	—	
1946	Primera División	30	10	6	14	46	56	26	10th					—	—	
1947	Primera División	24	9	8	7	47	39	26	5th					—	—	
1948	Primera División	24	10	4	10	52	47	24	9th					—	—	
1949	Primera División	22	16	2	4	43	25	34	1st	CA TCA	R1 C			Infante	17	
1950	Primera División	22	4	6	12	33	50	14	11th	CA	R1			—	—	
1951	Primera División	27	10	6	11	59	52	26	7th					—	—	
1952	Primera División	33	10	9	14	59	64	29	8th					—	—	
1953	Primera División	26	9	8	9	49	43	26	8th					—	—	
1954	Primera División	33	18	7	8	67	55	43	1st					Montuori	22	
1955	Primera División	31	8	5	18	49	64	21	14th					—	—	
1956	Segunda División	21	15	2	4	43	21	32	1st					—	—	
1957	Primera División	26	8	5	13	35	49	21	13th					—	—	
1958	Primera División	26	9	9	8	51	47	27	6th	CC	RU			—	—	
1959	Primera División	26	9	5	12	45	53	23	8th	CC	QF			—	—	
1960	Primera División	26	5	8	13	41	58	18	14th	CC	QF			—	—	
1961	Primera División	26	15	8	3	69	35	38	1st	CC	RU			Trigilli	21	
1962	Primera División	34	22	6	6	78	47	50	2nd	CC	RU	CL	SF	—	—	
1963	Primera División	34	15	11	8	66	52	41	5th					—	—	
1964	Primera División	34	18	7	9	78	50	43	2nd					—	—	
1965	Primera División	34	21	9	4	71	39	51	2nd					—	—	
1966	Primera División	34	20	8	6	70	34	48	1st			CL	SF	Gallardo	15	
1967	Primera División	34	17	10	7	68	48	44	2nd			CL	R1	—	—	
1968	Primera División	34	16	8	10	61	43	40	2nd			CL	QF	Isella	16	
1969	Primera División	32	13	6	13	64	66	32	6th			CL	SF	Delém, Sarnari	11	
1970	Primera División	39	23	4	12	75	61	54	4th					Messen	28	
1971	Primera División	34	13	4	17	49	51	30	13th					Crisosto	21	
1972	Primera División	34	14	11	9	42	41	39	7th					Solís	10	
1973	Primera División	34	5	11	18	43	62	21	18th					Salinas	10	
1974	Segunda División	14	5	3	6	16	19	13	10th	CC	R1			—	—	
1975	Segunda División	30	18	9	3	64	22	45	1st	CC	R1			—	—	
1976	Primera División	34	14	10	10	48	39	38	7th					Gallina	10	
1977	Primera División	34	8	12	14	36	48	28	14th	CC	R1			Roselli	12	
1978	Primera División	34	11	11	12	43	37	33	9th					Arriaza	9	
1979	Primera División	34	9	15	10	45	38	33	10th	CC	QF			Ubilla	10	
1980	Primera División	34	12	11	11	48	48	35	10th	CC	R1			Arriaza	12	
1981	Primera División	30	11	8	11	41	33	30	8th	CC	R1			Neira	12	
1982	Primera División	30	13	11	6	50	33	38	6th	CC	RU			Neira	12	
1983	Primera División	45	15	18	12	82	68	50	5th	CC CR	C C			Aravena	24	
1984	Primera División	29	17	8	4	50	18	42	1st	CC	RU	CL	SF	Aravena	16	
1985	Primera División	41	19	12	10	64	52	50	6th	CC	R1			Vargas	13	
1986	Primera División	34	15	8	11	56	41	38	6th	CC	R1	CL	R1	Neira	12	
1987	Primera División	30	21	7	2	51	16	49	1st	CC	R1			Hurtado	21	
1988	Primera División	32	15	5	12	44	37	35	4th	CC	SF	CL	R16	Tudor, Olmos	8	
1989	Primera División	33	19	8	6	66	26	47	2nd	CC CI	RU SF			Barrera	12	
1990	Primera División	33	14	12	7	70	46	41	2nd	CC	RU	CL	QF	Reinoso	17	
1991	Primera División	35	19	7	9	63	42	45	3rd	CC	C			Reinoso, Contreras	9	
1992	Primera División	35	18	7	10	65	47	44	3rd	CC	QF	CL	R16	Almada	20	
1993	Primera División	32	15	8	9	56	37	38	3rd	CC	R2	CL	RU	Tudor	17	
1994	Primera División	33	23	7	3	93	30	53	2nd	CC	R1	CI	C	Acosta	33	
1995	Primera División	33	20	9	4	55	24	69	2nd	CC	C	CL	R16	Acosta	10	
1996	Primera División	34	20	8	6	82	48	68	2nd	CC	QF	CL	GS	Rozental	24	
1997	Apertura Clausura	16 15	12 9	4 3	1 3	39 25	14 15	40 30	1st 2nd			CL	QF	Bisconti Bisconti	15 7	
1998	Primera División	33	14	14	5	59	36	56	3rd	CC	R1	CL CM	GS R1	Figueroa	16	
1999	Primera División	30	19	7	4	67	31	64	2nd			CL CM	R16 R1	Rozental	22	
2000	Primera División	32	12	11	9	55	46	47	6th	CC	R1	CL CM	GS R1	Brizuela	11	
2001	Primera División	30	18	6	6	60	29	60	2nd			CM	QF	Norambuena	12	
2002	Apertura Clausura	23 23	12 11	8 7	3 5	56 39	30 26	44 40	1st 2nd			CL	R16	Norambuena Norambuena, Mirosevic	14 6	
2003	Apertura Clausura	19 19	8 7	7 3	4 9	33 28	23 29	31 24	5th 6th			CL CS	GS R1	Gioino Norambuena	8 7	
2004	Apertura Clausura	19 23	6 12	2 6	11 5	32 48	33 30	20 42	13th 3rd					Álvarez, Husaín, Taborda J. Quinteros	4 8	
2005	Apertura Clausura	23 25	16 18	4 6	3 1	46 42	16 10	52 60	3rd 1st			CS	SF	Villanueva L. Quinteros	12 10	
2006	Apertura Clausura	21 20	9 9	7 4	5 7	31 24	26 22	34 31	6th 7th			CL	GS	J. Quinteros Arostegui	8 5	
2007	Apertura Clausura	21 22	14 11	4 4	3 7	36 38	17 26	46 37	2nd 5th					Núñez Fuertes	11 11	
2008	Apertura Clausura	21 20	11 9	4 4	6 7	39 41	23 37	37 31	7th 6th	CC	R1	CL CS	GS R16	Botinelli J. Gutiérrez	8 12	
2009	Apertura Clausura	21 23	10 14	5 7	6 2	34 57	19 22	35 49	4ht 2nd	CC	R1			Mirosevic Toloza	8 12	
2010	Primera División	34	23	5	6	77	39	74	1st	CC	R16	CL	GS	Mirosevic	19	
2011	Apertura Clausura	23 21	14 11	6 4	3 6	44 36	27 22	48 37	2nd 4th	CC	C	CL CS	QF R16	F. Gutiérrez, Pratto Carignano	6 6	
2012	Apertura Clausura	19 17	8 6	7 5	4 6	32 24	21 23	31 23	6th 9th	CC	RU	CL CS	GS SF	F. Gutiérrez Castillo	7 4	
2013	Transición	19	12	4	3	39	22	40	2nd	CC	RU			Sosa	8	
2013-14	Apertura Clausura	17 17	12 10	3 3	2 4	37 32	13 19	39 33	2nd 2nd	CC	SF	CS	R16	Sosa Botinelli	9 7	
2014-15	Apertura Clausura	17 21	5 10	2 6	10 5	20 49	25 38	17 36	14th 4th	CC	R1	CS	R1	Llanos Ríos	4 6	
2015-16	Apertura Clausura	19 15	12 9	2 2	5 4	41 33	20 25	38 29	2nd 1st	CC SC	R16 C	CS	R2	R. Gutiérrez Castillo	6 11	
2016-17	Apertura Clausura	15 15	9 7	4 2	2 6	37 25	18 23	31 23	1st 4th	CC SC	SF RU	CS	R1	Castillo R. Gutiérrez	13 4	
2017	Transición	15	4	4	7	17	19	16	11th	CC	R16	CL	GS	Fuenzalida, Buonanotte	4	
2018	Primera División	30	17	10	3	39	25	61	1st	CC	R1			Buonanotte	7	
2019	Primera División	24	16	5	3	44	14	53	1st	CC SC	SF C	CL CS	GS R2	Fuenzalida	10	
2020	Primera División	34	18	11	5	65	35	65	1st	CC SC	— (Note: Cancelled due to the COVID-19 pandemic.) C	CL CS	GS QF	Zampredri	20	
2021	Primera División	32	22	2	8	65	34	68	1st	CC SC	R8 C	CL	R16	Zampredri	23	
2022	Primera División	30	13	6	11	41	38	45	6th	CC SC	QF RU	CL CS	GS R16	Zampredri	18	
2023	Primera División	30	11	9	10	48	43	42	7th	CC	R8	CS	R1	Zampredri	17	
2024	Primera División	30	13	7	10	44	34	46	5th	CC	R32	CS	R1	Zampredri	19	
2025	Liga de Primera	30	17	7	6	44	2	58	2nd	CC	GS	CS	R1	Zampredri	16	
2026	Liga de Primera	-	-	-	-	-	-	-		CC CdL SC	- GS RU	CL	-			

== See also ==
- Universidad Católica records and statistics
- Universidad Católica in international football
