= List of Club Deportivo Universidad Católica records and statistics =

Chilean Football Association Club

Club Deportivo Universidad Católica is a Chilean professional association football club based in Santiago. Universidad Católica currently plays in the Chilean Primera División.

This list encompasses the major honours won by Universidad Católica and records set by the club and their players. The club's record appearance maker is Mario Lepe, who made 639 appearances from 1982 to 2000; the club's record goalscorer is forward Rodrigo Barrera, who scored 118 goals in all competitions from 1990 to 2002.

== Honours ==
=== Domestic ===
==== League ====
- Primera División

Winners (16): 1949, 1954, 1961, 1966, 1984, 1987, 1997-A, 2002-A, 2005-C, 2010, 2016-C, 2016-A, 2018, 2019, 2020, 2021

- Segunda División

Winners (2): 1956, 1975

==== Cups ====
- Copa Chile

Winners (4): 1983, 1991, 1995, 2011

- Copa República

Winners (1): 1983

- Supercopa de Chile:

Winners (4): 2016, 2019, 2020, 2021

=== Continental ===
- Copa Libertadores

Runners-up (1): 1993

- Copa Interamericana: 1

Winners (1): 1993

=== International (Unofficial) ===
- International Tournament of Pascua: 1

Winners (1): 1950

== Players ==
=== Appearances ===
Competitive, professional matches only. Bold indicates player is still active at club level.

Rank	Player	Years	Total
1	(Chile) Mario Lepe	1982-2000	639
2	(Chile) Andrés Romero	1984-1999	484
3	(Chile) Nelson Parraguez	1991-2004	435
4	(Chile) Cristián Álvarez	1998-2018	423
5	(Chile) Alberto Fouillioux	1957-1975	371
6	(Chile) Sergio Livingstone	1938-1959	366
7	(Chile) Rodrigo Barrera	1990-2002	352
8	(Chile) Milovan Mirosevic	1997-2017	338
9	(Chile) Washington Villarroel	1958-1971	328
10	(Chile) Jorge Ormeño	2004-2012	323

==== Others ====
- Player with most trophies with Universidad Católica: **11** – (Chile) José Pedro Fuenzalida
- Most appearances in Universidad Católica: **639** – (Chile) Mario Lepe
- Most appearances in Copa Libertadores de América: **76** – (Chile) Mario Lepe
- Most appearances in Copa Sudamericana: **27** – (Chile) Cristopher Toselli

=== Goalscorers ===
Competitive, professional matches only. Appearances, including substitutes, appear in parentheses.

Rank	Player	Years	League	2ºLeague	Cup	South America^{[A]}	Other^{[B]}	Total	Ratio
1	(Argentina) (Chile) Fernando Zampedri	2020-	113	-	11	15	-	**139** (225)	0.61
2	(Chile) Rodrigo Barrera	1986-2002	77	-	33	7	1	**118** (352)	0.34
3	(Chile) Raimundo Infante	1946-1957	105	9	-	-	-	**114** (184)	0.62
4	(Chile) Alberto Fouillioux	1958-1975	89	-	5	11	-	**108** (372)	0.29
5	(Argentina) Néstor Isella	1963-1970	93	3	-	12	-	**105** (232)	0.45
6	(Chile) Osvaldo Hurtado	1980-1988	68	-	32	3	1	**104** (267)	0.39
7	(Chile) Milovan Mirošević	1997-2017	78	-	6	8	4	**96** (338)	0.28
8	(Argentina) Alberto Acosta	1994-1997	60	-	13	19	-	**92** (105)	0.88
9	(Chile) Jorge Aravena	1976-1984	44	-	35	4	2	**85** (123)	0.69
10	(Chile) Luis Pérez	1985-1990	41	-	28	6	-	**85** (398)	0.21

^{1}Includes all South America club competitive competitions, Copa Libertadores and Copa Interamericana.
^{2}Includes Torneos de Invierno, Copa República, Mercosur, Liguillas y Copa Apertura.

==== Others ====
- Most goals scored in Primera División: **113** – (Argentina) (Chile) Fernando Zampedri
- Most goals scored in Segunda División: **13** – (Chile) Horacio Cisternas
- Most goals scored in Copa Chile: **35** – Jorge Aravena
- Most goals scored in Supercopa de Chile: **2**
  - (Argentina) Fernando Zampedri
  - (Chile) Gonzalo Tapia
- Most goals scored in Copa Libertadores: **18** – (Argentina) Alberto Acosta
- Most goals scored in Copa Sudamericana: **6** – (Argentina) Jorge Quinteros
- Most goals in a match: Luka Tudor, 7 goals (against Deportes Antofagasta, First Division, 21 November 1993)
- Youngest hat-trick scorer: Jeisson Vargas, 18 years, 51 days (against San Marcos de Arica, First Division, 6 November 2015)
- 1º Division top scorers
  - **17** – (Chile) Víctor Mancilla (1943)
  - **21** – (Chile) Osvaldo "Arica" Hurtado (1987)
  - **33** – (Argentina) Alberto Acosta (1994)
  - **15** – (Argentina) David Bisconti (Apertura 1997)
  - **19** – (Chile) Milovan Mirošević (2010)
  - **11** – (Chile) Nicolás Castillo (Clausura 2016)
  - **13** – (Chile) Nicolás Castillo (Apertura 2016)
  - **20** – (Argentina) Fernando Zampedri (2020)
  - **23** – (Argentina) Fernando Zampedri (2021)
  - **18** – (Argentina) Fernando Zampedri (2022)
  - **17** – (Argentina) Fernando Zampedri (2023)
  - **19** – (Argentina) Fernando Zampedri (2024)
  - **16** – (Argentina) (Chile) Fernando Zampedri (2025)
- International cups top scorers
  - **9** – (Argentina) Juan Carlos Almada (Copa Libertadores 1993)
  - **11** – (Argentina) Alberto Acosta (Copa Libertadores 1997)
  - **5** – (Argentina) Jorge Quinteros (Copa Libertadores 2006)
  - **5** – (Chile) Michael Ríos (Copa Sudamericana 2012)
- America's Ideal Team
  - (Chile) Patricio Toledo (1991)
  - (Peru) José Guillermo del Solar (1991)
  - (Chile) Gary Medel (2009)

=== Others records ===
- Least beaten goalkeeper: **1352** – (Argentina) José María Buljubasich

== Team records ==
=== Matches ===
==== Record wins ====
- Record Primera División win: 10–1 (v. Palestino, 1994)
- Record Copa Chile win: 10–0 (v. San Pedro de Atacama, 2010)
- Record Supercopa de Chile win: 5–0 (v. Palestino, 2019)
- Record Copa Libertadores win: 6–0 (v. Mineros de Guayana, Venezuela, 1997 and v. Minervén S.C., Venezuela, 1997)
- Record Copa Mercosur win: 2–0 (v. Boca Juniors, 29 September 1998)
- Record Copa Sudamericana win: 5–0 (v. Alianza Atlético, 2005)

==== Record defeats ====
- Record Primera División defeat: 2–9 (v. Audax Italiano, 1945)
- Record Supercopa de Chile defeat: 1–4 (v. Colo Colo, 2017)
- Record Copa Libertadores defeat: 2–7 (v. Emelec, 1945)
- Record Copa Mercosur defeat: 1–5 (v. Gremio, 1 September 1998)
- Record Copa Sudamericana defeat: 0–5 (v. Independiente del Valle, 2019)

==== Record consecutive results ====
- Most games won in one league season: 27 (in 1999)
- Most games won in short tournaments: 18 (in Clausura 2005)

=== Goals ===
- Most goals scored in one league season: 102 (in 1999)
- Most goals scored in short tournaments: 56 (in Apertura 2002)

=== Points ===
- Most points in one league season:
  - Two points for a win: 54 points (in 39 matches in the 1970 Primera División de Chile, First Division)
  - Three points for a win: 74 points (in 34 matches in the 2010 Primera Division of Chile, First Division)
- Most points in short tournaments:
  - Three points for a win: 49 points (in 19 matches in the 2005 Torneo Clausura, First Division)
- Fewest points in a season:
  - Two points for a win: 10 points (in 10 matches in the 1942 Primera División de Chile, First Division)
  - Three points for a win: 44 points (in 30 matches in the 2000 Chilean Primera División, First Division)
- Fewest points in short tournaments:
  - Three points for a win: 16 points (in 15 matches in the 2017 Chilean Primera División, First Division)

== Other achievements ==
- Seasons in Primera División: 79 (1939–1955, 1957–1973, 1976–)
- Seasons in Segunda División: 3 (1956, 1974–1975)
- Best IFFHS position: 8th
- Highest attendance: 77,890 against Universidad de Chile (on 11 January 1967, at Estadio Nacional)
- Highest home attendance: 20,396 against Cobreloa (on 1 November 1992, at San Carlos de Apoquindo)
