= Ignacio Prieto =

Chilean footballer (born 1943)

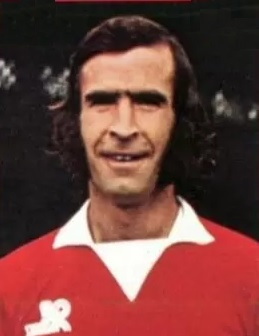
- Prieto with Lille in 1975.

Personal information
- Full name: Ignacio Prieto Urrejola
- Date of birth: September 23, 1943 (age 83)
- Place of birth: Santiago, Chile
- Positions: Midfielder; defender

Senior career*
Years	Team	Apps	(Gls)
1962–1967	Universidad Católica	147	(47)
1968–1971	Nacional		
1971–1976	Lille	97	
1976–1977	Laval	15	
1977–1979	Universidad Católica	88	(5)

International career
1965–1977	Chile	29	(3)

Managerial career
- 1983–1990: Universidad Católica
- 1990–1992: Cruz Azul
- 1992–1993: Universidad Católica
- 1994: Colo-Colo
- 1996: Chile U23
- * Club domestic league appearances and goals

Ignacio Prieto Urrejola (born September 23, 1943) is a former Chilean football manager and player who played for 5 clubs and in the Chile national football team in the FIFA World Cup England 1966.

== Playing career ==
- Universidad Católica 1962-1967
- Nacional 1968-1971
- Lille 1971-1976
- Laval 1976-1977
- Universidad Católica 1977-1979

He was the Chilean footballer who played the most matches in France's Ligue 1 with 112 until Guillermo Maripán reached 113 matches in January 2024.

== Coaching career ==
- Universidad Católica 1983-1990
- Cruz Azul 1990-1992
- Universidad Católica 1992-1993
- Colo-Colo 1994

== Personal life ==
His father, Fernando Prieto Concha, nicknamed Palomeque, was one of the founders of C.D. Green Cross as well as a forward of the same club.

He is the younger brother of the former Chile international footballer Andrés Prieto. From his brother, he is the uncle of José Antonio "Toño" Prieto, a well-known sports journalist in Chilean radio media.

His son, Nicolás, is a football coach who has worked for the Universidad de Chile youth system.

== Other works ==
- ALEF (Latin American Football Managers Association): Vice-President (2004)
- Colegio de Técnicos de Chile (Football Managers Association of Chile): President (2005–2007)

== Titles (Player) ==
- Universidad Católica (national): 1966 (Chilean Primera División)
- Universidad Católica (friendlies): 1984 Trofeo Ciudad de Palma, 1985 Trofeo Ciudad de Alicante, Copa Honorino Landa, 1993 Trofeo Teide
- Nacional (national): 1969, 1970, 1971 (Uruguayan Primera División)
- Nacional (international): 1971 Copa Libertadores, 1971 Intercontinental Cup
- Lille: 1973–74 (French Division 2)
- Chile: 1965 Copa del Pacífico

== Titles (Coach) ==
- Universidad Católica: 1983 Copa Polla Gol, 1983 Copa República, 1984, 1987 (Chilean Primera División)
- Colo-Colo: 1994 (Copa Chile)
