= Carlos Soto (footballer, born 1965) =

Chilean footballer

Personal information
- Full name: Carlos Alberto Soto Olivares
- Date of birth: 12 March 1965 (age 61)
- Place of birth: Santiago, Chile
- Position: Defensive midfielder

Youth career
- Universidad Católica

Senior career*
Years	Team	Apps	(Gls)
1983–1990	Universidad Católica	125	(10)
1987	→ O'Higgins (loan)		(1)
1991	Coquimbo Unido	25	(4)
1992–1995	Deportes Temuco	99	(5)
1996	Provincial Osorno	8	(0)
1997	Santiago Morning		(1)
Total			(21)

International career
1983	Chile U20	4	(1)
1983	Chile B		
- * Club domestic league appearances and goals

Carlos Alberto Soto Olivares (born 12 March 1965) is a Chilean former professional footballer who played as a defensive midfielder.

== Club career ==
Soto is a product of Universidad Católica youth system, where he coincided with players such as Eduardo Soto, Luis Abarca and Mario Lepe. He stayed with the club until the 1990 season, with a stint on loan at O'Higgins in the 1987 Segunda División, when they got promotion to the top division. With Universidad Católica, Soto won the Copa República, the 1983 Copa Polla Gol and the 1984 Primera División.

In the Chilean Primera División, he also played for Coquimbo Unido, Deportes Temuco and Provincial Osorno. With Coquimbo Unido, they became the runners-up of 1991 Primera División and qualified to the 1992 Copa Libertadores.

He ended his career playing for Santiago Morning in the 1997 Primera B.

== International career ==
Soto represented Chile at under-20 level in the 1983 South American Championship and scored a goal against Colombia in the first matchday.

At senior level, he represented the Chile national team in the 1983 Pan American Games

== Post-retirement ==
He led SIFUP, the trade union of professional football players in Chile, from 1998 to 2016, alongside former footballers such as Sergio Villegas and Ricardo Rojas. At the same time he studied laws. Once he graduated as a lawyer, he became a football agent in 2018.

== Honours ==
Universidad Católica

- Chilean Primera División: 1984
- Copa Polla Gol: 1983
- Copa República: 1983
