= Gino Valentini =

Chilean footballer and manager (born 1958)

Personal information
- Full name: Gino Alberto Valentini Cuadra
- Date of birth: 10 October 1958 (age 68)
- Place of birth: Santiago, Chile
- Position: Midfielder

Youth career
- Universidad Católica

Senior career*
Years	Team	Apps	(Gls)
1978–1984	Universidad Católica	82	(8)
1984	Real Oviedo		
1985–1986	Tampico Madero		
1987	Unión San Felipe		
1988	Deportes Arica		
1989–1990	Irapuato		

Managerial career
- Universidad Católica (youth)
- 1996: Regional Atacama
- 1997–1998: Municipal Las Condes
- 1999–2000: Provincial Osorno
- 2003–2004: Deportes Puerto Montt
- 2012: Deportes Puerto Montt
- 2013: Deportes Puerto Montt
- 2018: Deportes Melipilla
- * Club domestic league appearances and goals

Gino Alberto Valentini Cuadra (born 10 October 1958) is a Chilean football manager and former player who played as a midfielder for clubs in Chile, Spain and Mexico.

== Playing career ==
A product of Universidad Católica youth system, Valentini is well remembered for scoring the winning goal in the Clásico Universitario played in 1984, where his team broke a stint of 13 years with no defeating Universidad de Chile.

In his homeland, he also played for Unión San Felipe (1987) and Deportes Arica (1988) in the Chilean Segunda División.

In Spain, he played for Real Oviedo in the second level, where he came alongside his fellow Óscar Meneses.

In Mexico, he played for Tampico Madero and Irapuato in the top division.

== Managerial career ==
Valentini worked as both manager and coach in the Universidad Católica youth system, where he trained players such as Jorge Kike Acuña. As an anecdote, he met and could join Lionel Scaloni to the club when the Argentine was fourteen years old.

As head coach, he has led Regional Atacama, Municipal Las Condes, Provincial Osorno, with whom he got promotion to the top division in the 1999 season, Deportes Puerto Montt and Deportes Melipilla.

Valentini also served as sport manager of Deportes Melipilla and sport adviser for Deportes Concepción.

=== Controversies ===
In the context of the relegation of Deportes Melipilla to the Primera B de Chile in the 2021 season, Valentini reported irregulatities and contract issues with the players while he was the sport manager. So, he has had public quarrels with the then coach, Carlos Encinas.

== Personal life ==
His daughter, Camila, is an influencer and kinesiologist who lost her left forearm after she was hit by a bus.

== Honours ==
=== As player ===
Universidad Católica

- Chilean Primera División: 1984
- Copa Polla Gol: 1983
- Copa República: 1983
