= Patricio Mardones =

Chilean footballer (born 1962)

Personal information
- Full name: Luis Patricio Mardones Díaz
- Date of birth: 17 July 1962 (age 64)
- Place of birth: San Vicente de Tagua Tagua, Chile
- Height: 1.75 m (5 ft 9 in)
- Position: Midfielder

Senior career*
Years	Team	Apps	(Gls)
1982–1988	Universidad Católica	152	(16)
1982	→ Rangers (loan)	16	(0)
1988–1991	St. Gallen	35	(4)
1992–1993	O'Higgins	54	(5)
1994–1996	Universidad de Chile	68	(21)

International career
1985–1995	Chile	29	(2)

Managerial career
- 1997–2001: Universidad de Chile (youth)
- 2001–2003: Universidad de Chile (assistant)
- 2004–2007: Universidad del Desarrollo
- 2012–2016: INACAP
- * Club domestic league appearances and goals

Luis Patricio Mardones Díaz (born 17 July 1962), known as Patricio Mardones, is a Chilean former professional footballer who played as a midfielder.

== Playing career ==
Mardones is a historical player of the traditional rivals Universidad Católica and Universidad de Chile, since he won two national leagues along with each team.

He played for the Chile national team and was capped 29 times scoring 2 goal between 1985 and 1995. Mardones made his debut on 8 February 1985 in a friendly against Finland.

== Coaching career ==
He worked for Universidad de Chile as the coach of youth ranks (1997–2001) and the assistant coach of the first team (2001–2003). Next, he switched to the university football, and coached the teams of both Universidad del Desarrollo and Universidad Tecnológica INACAP.

In addition, from 2016 to 2017 he performed as Director of Azul Azul, the public limited company that manages Universidad de Chile. Next, he switched to Head of Recruitment for the youth ranks until 2020.

== Personal life ==
Mardones was a candidate to councillor for La Reina commune in the 2024 Chilean regional elections.

== Honours ==
Universidad Católica

- Copa Polla Gol: 1983
- Copa de la República: 1983
- Chilean Primera División: 1984, 1987

Universidad de Chile

- Chilean Primera División: 1994, 1995
