= 1984 Copa Polla Gol =

Football tournament in Chile won by Everton

Tournament details
- Country: Chile

The 1984 Copa Polla Gol was the 14th edition of the Chilean Cup tournament. The competition started on May 13, 1984, and concluded on July 25, 1984. Only first level teams took part in the tournament. Everton won the competition for their first time, beating Universidad Católica 3–0 in the final.

== Calendar ==
Round	Date
Group Round	13 May 1984; 8 July 1984
Semifinals	15 July 1984; 19 July 1984
Final	25 July 1984

== Group Round ==
=== North Group ===
	DARI	DIQU	DANT	CLOA	CSAL	RATA
D. Arica		4–0	0–1	0–0	1–4	1–0
D. Iquique	3–0		5–1	0–2	0–1	2–2
D. Antofagasta	3–2	1–2		0–0	4–3	3–2
Cobreloa	1–1	2–0	4–0		0–0	1–0
Cobresal	2–0	5–0	2–1	2–2		1–1
R. Atacama	0–0	1–0	0–0	2–1	1–2	

Rank	Team	Points
1	Cobresal	15
2	Cobreloa	13
3	Deportes Antofagasta	10
4	Regional Atacama	8
5	Deportes Arica	7 (-5)
6	Deportes Iquique	7 (-7)

=== Central Group ===
	DLSE	COQU	USFE	TRAS	SLUI	EVER	SWAN
D. La Serena		2–2	0–1	6–1		0–1	1–1
Coquimbo U.	3–1		1–0	4–1	2–0	1–2	2–0
U. San Felipe	2–0	4–1		0–1	1–1	2–1	1–0
Trasandino	3–1		1–1		1–0	2–1	1–1
San Luis	1–2	1–0	3–0	1–1		1–1	0–0
Everton	0–0	1–0	1–0	3–1	2–0		
S. Wanderers		5–1	4–1	1–0	0–1	1–0	

Rank	Team	Points
1	Everton	17
2	Unión San Felipe	14
3	Santiago Wanderers	12 (+4)
4	Coquimbo Unido	12 (-1;GF:20)
5	San Luis	12 (-1;GF:10)
6	Trasandino	12 (-10)
7	Deportes La Serena	9

=== Interzone ===
UCAT	6–2	TRAS	0–0
USFE	4–1	UESP	
PALE	3–2	COQU	1–1
DLSE	2–1	MAGA	4–1
COLO	1–0	SWAN	1–1
EVER	0–0	UCHI	0–1
SLUI	1–1	AUDI	0–0

=== Metropolitan Group ===
	UESP	UCAT	PALE	COLO	UCHI	AUDA	MAGA
U. Española		4–1	1–0	1–1	1–0	0–0	2–2
U. Católica			1–0	1–1	1–0	1–1	2–1
Palestino	1–1	1–2		2–2	2–2	3–0	0–2
Colo-Colo	2–3	2–3	4–0		0–1	2–0	4–0
U. de Chile	1–1	0–1	3–1	2–1		7–1	1–1
Audax I.	1–0	1–1	1–0	2–3	4–2		0–3
Magallanes	2–2	0–0	2–1	2–2	0–0	4–2	

Rank	Team	Points
1	Universidad Católica	19
2	Magallanes	16
3	Colo-Colo	15
4	Unión Española	14
5	Universidad de Chile	13
6	Audax Italiano	11
7	Palestino	8

=== South Group ===
	OHIG	RANG	NAVA	HUAC	FVIA	GRCT
O'Higgins		5–4	1–2	3–4	0–1	0–3
Rangers	5–2		0–5	1–1	0–0	0–2
Naval	2–3	1–2		0–0	1–1	1–0
Huachipato	1–1	2–0	4–1		2–0	0–2
F. Vial	4–3	1–0	1–0	0–1		0–1
Green Cross T.	4–2	0–1	1–1	3–1	2–1	

Rank	Team	Points
1	Green Cross Temuco	15
2	Huachipato	13
3	Fernández Vial	10
4	Naval	9
5	Rangers	8
6	O'Higgins	5

== Semifinals ==
July 15, 1984

Green Cross Temuco	0 – 0	Universidad Católica

Estadio Municipal, Temuco
Attendance: 9,945
Referee: G. Castro

July 15, 1984

Cobresal	1 – 0	Everton
Pedetti 38'

Estadio El Cobre, El Salvador
Attendance: 4,425
Referee: M. Lira

July 18, 1984

Universidad Católica	3 – 2	Green Cross Temuco
Aravena 19' (pen.); Isasi 32'; Vargas 89'		4' (pen.) Arias; 18' Miranda

Estadio Santa Laura, Santiago
Attendance: 5,734
Referee: S. Vásquez

July 19, 1984

Everton	2 – 0	Cobresal
Olivera 40'; Ramos 75'

Estadio Sausalito, Viña del Mar
Attendance: 7,446
Referee: H. Silva

== Final ==
July 25, 1984

Universidad Católica	0 – 3	Everton
		6' Ramos; 16' P. Díaz; 55' Olivera

Estadio Nacional, Santiago
Attendance: 13,500
Referee: J. Silvagno

== Top goalscorer ==
- Aníbal González (O'Higgins) 11 goals

== See also ==
- 1984 Campeonato Nacional

== Sources ==
- solofutbol
