= Luis Abarca =

Chilean footballer (born 1965)

Personal information
- Full name: Luis Hernán Abarca Aravena
- Date of birth: 28 June 1965 (age 61)
- Place of birth: Peñaflor, Chile
- Position: Defender

Senior career*
Years	Team	Apps	(Gls)
1983–1990	Universidad Católica	113	(4)
1991	C.D. Cobreloa	24	(1)
1992–1997	Universidad de Chile	102	(3)
1998–1999	Deportes Iquique	54	(0)
2000	Deportes Melipilla		
2001	Unión La Calera		

International career
1991	Chile	3	(0)

Managerial career
- 2010: Deportes Melipilla
- 2011: Provincial Talagante
- 2012: Trasandino
- 2013: General Velásquez
- 2014–2015: Deportes Linares
- 2015: General Velásquez
- * Club domestic league appearances and goals

Luis Abarca (born 28 June 1965) is a Chilean football manager and former player. He played as a defender.

== International career ==
Abarca obtained a total number of three caps for the Chile national team in 1991.

== Achievements ==
Universidad Católica

- 1983 Copa República
- Copa Chile: 1984
- Primera División de Chile: 1984, 1987

Universidad de Chile

- Primera División de Chile: 1994, 1995
