= 1983 Campeonato Nacional Primera División =

Campeonato Nacional 1983
- Dates: 2 July 1983 – 1 April 1984
- Champions: Colo-Colo (14th title)
- Relegated: none
- 1985 Copa Libertadores: Colo-Colo; Magallanes (Liguilla winners)
- Matches: 462
- Goals: 1,294 (2.8 per match)
- Top goalscorer: Washington Olivera (29 goals)
- Biggest home win: Cobreloa 9–0 Regional Atacama (4 March 1984)
- Highest attendance: 74,769 Universidad de Chile 0–0 Colo-Colo (4 February 1984)
- Total attendance: 2,818,841
- Average attendance: 6,101

The 1983 Campeonato Nacional was Chilean football league top tier’s 51st season. Colo-Colo was the tournament’s champion, winning its fourteenth title. There was no relegation, in order to increase the number of teams for the next season.

== League table ==
Pos	Team	Pld	W	D	L	GF	GA	GD	Pts	Qualification
1	Colo-Colo	42	27	9	6	92	41	+51	63	Champions; Qualified to 1985 Copa Libertadores
2	Cobreloa	42	26	10	6	96	36	+60	62	Qualified to Liguilla Pre-Copa Libertadores
3	Universidad de Chile	42	21	11	10	58	41	+17	53	Qualified to Liguilla Pre-Copa Libertadores
4	Magallanes	42	19	12	11	85	62	+23	50	Qualified to Liguilla Pre-Copa Libertadores
5	Universidad Católica	42	15	16	11	80	64	+16	48 (Note: 2 bonus points awarded.)	Qualified to Liguilla Pre-Copa Libertadores
6	Naval	42	18	11	13	63	54	+9	48 (Note: 1 bonus point awarded.)	
7	Rangers	42	15	17	10	63	52	+11	47	
8	Everton	42	16	12	14	46	46	0	44	
9	Arturo Fernández Vial	42	14	14	14	50	57	−7	42	
10	Deportes Arica	42	15	11	16	57	58	−1	41	
11	Huachipato	42	15	11	16	41	48	−7	41	
12	Palestino	42	11	18	13	49	62	−13	40	
13	Green Cross Temuco	42	13	13	16	69	65	+4	39	
14	Trasandino	42	12	15	15	59	60	−1	39	
15	O'Higgins	42	12	14	16	61	69	−8	38	
16	Deportes Iquique	42	9	18	15	43	60	−17	37	
17	Deportes Antofagasta	42	12	13	17	44	64	−20	37	
18	Unión San Felipe	42	13	9	20	61	80	−19	35	
19	Regional Atacama	42	11	13	18	41	63	−22	35	
20	Unión Española	42	14	5	23	56	75	−19	33	
21	Santiago Wanderers	42	7	14	21	46	72	−26	29	
22	Audax Italiano	42	7	14	21	34	65	−31	28	

Notes:

Campeonato Nacional
1983 champions
Colo-Colo
14th title

== Results ==
Home \ Away	AUD	ANT	ARI	ATA	CLO	COL	EVE	FVI	GCT	HUA	IQU	MAG	NAV	OHI	PAL	RAN	SFE	TRA	UCA	UCH	UES	SWA
Audax		1–1	2–3	1–3	0–3	1–2	2–1	1–1	2–1	0–3	2–0	1–3	0–1	1–2	1–1	0–0	3–1	0–0	0–6	0–2	0–2	1–3
Antofagasta	0–1		2–1	1–0	1–3	0–0	0–0	0–1	2–1	2–0	2–1	0–0	3–1	2–2	2–0	0–0	2–1	2–1	1–3	0–1	1–2	2–2
Arica	2–0	0–0		2–0	1–1	2–3	0–4	1–0	1–1	1–1	3–1	1–2	3–0	1–0	1–1	1–1	5–1	4–2	1–0	0–1	4–0	3–0
Atacama	0–0	2–0	1–2		3–0	0–3	2–0	2–2	2–2	1–1	1–1	1–0	1–2	0–1	2–0	3–3	0–0	0–0	1–0	2–1	2–0	1–0
Cobreloa	1–1	3–0	5–0	9–0		1–0	3–1	5–0	2–1	2–0	2–0	5–2	4–4	7–1	0–0	2–1	4–2	1–0	4–1	5–0	3–0	3–2
Colo-Colo	2–0	1–0	0–2	1–0	1–1		3–0	2–1	3–1	1–0	2–0	1–2	3–0	5–1	3–2	1–1	2–1	4–2	2–3	1–1	5–0	7–2
Everton	1–1	1–1	0–0	2–2	0–1	0–4		2–0	3–1	3–0	1–0	1–0	1–1	1–1	1–0	1–1	1–0	2–1	0–1	1–0	2–0	1–0
F. Vial	0–1	6–3	3–1	1–0	1–0	1–1	0–1		2–1	0–2	4–2	0–2	0–0	1–0	4–2	0–1	2–2	1–0	3–2	3–0	1–0	1–0
Green Cross T.	1–0	2–3	3–1	6–0	1–1	1–2	0–1	1–1		3–1	5–1	5–1	1–4	3–2	3–3	1–1	2–1	1–0	1–2	1–1	2–1	2–1
Huachipato	1–0	1–0	0–0	1–2	2–1	0–2	1–0	1–1	1–1		3–1	2–1	1–0	0–0	0–0	1–7	4–1	1–0	0–2	0–2	0–0	0–0
Iquique	1–1	1–1	1–1	0–0	1–1	3–2	3–0	1–1	1–1	2–0		0–0	0–0	1–1	0–0	2–1	0–0	2–4	1–0	1–0	0–1	3–0
Magallanes	1–0	5–1	5–1	1–1	0–2	0–1	2–1	4–1	2–2	1–1	3–4		2–0	1–1	1–1	2–1	4–2	6–1	2–2	1–2	4–3	2–2
Naval	4–1	1–0	2–0	1–0	0–1	0–0	2–1	1–1	0–0	2–1	7–1	3–2		2–0	0–1	3–2	2–0	3–2	2–2	1–3	1–1	3–1
O'Higgins	1–1	1–2	2–0	2–1	3–1	6–1	4–1	0–0	1–2	0–1	3–0	3–3	2–2		1–1	3–1	3–1	1–1	3–1	0–2	3–2	0–0
Palestino	0–2	1–0	1–1	1–0	1–1	0–3	1–3	1–0	2–2	1–0	1–1	2–2	2–0	4–1		1–3	0–1	2–2	3–3	2–1	0–6	0–0
Rangers	0–0	3–1	0–2	1–0	2–1	1–1	1–1	1–2	2–1	1–0	0–0	0–1	5–2	2–0	3–2		2–2	2–5	1–0	2–2	2–1	0–0
San Felipe	2–1	0–0	2–1	6–2	0–2	1–4	2–1	2–2	3–0	0–2	2–1	4–3	1–0	3–0	0–1	3–2		2–0	1–1	2–0	2–4	2–2
Trasandino	3–1	2–2	3–1	1–0	1–1	1–1	0–0	0–0	2–2	3–1	2–2	0–2	1–1	1–0	1–2	1–1	5–1		1–0	0–2	2–1	4–1
U. Católica	2–1	8–2	0–0	4–1	1–0	2–5	1–1	3–2	2–2	2–2	0–0	0–0	2–1	5–2	3–3	1–2	2–2	1–1		0–2	4–1	3–2
U. de Chile	1–1	0–0	3–1	1–1	0–0	0–0	3–2	4–0	1–0	0–3	2–0	0–1	1–2	0–0	1–1	0–0	3–1	3–2	1–1		2–1	1–0
U. Española	3–1	1–2	1–0	1–1	1–3	1–4	1–2	3–3	2–1	0–1	2–1	1–5	1–0	3–1	1–2	1–2	1–0	0–1	1–1	2–4		1–0
S. Wanderers	0–0	3–0	3–2	2–0	0–1	0–3	0–0	1–1	0–1	2–1	2–2	2–4	0–2	1–3	2–0	1–1	4–1	0–0	3–3	1–4	1–3	

Legend: Blue = home team win; Yellow = draw; Red = away team win.

== Topscorer ==
Name	Team	Goals
(Uruguay) Washington Olivera	Cobreloa	29

== Liguilla Pre-Copa Libertadores ==
8 April 1984	Magallanes	0 – 1	Cobreloa	Estadio Nacional, Santiago
			21' Siviero	Attendance: 28,431; Referee: M. Lira

8 April 1984	Universidad de Chile	1 – 1	Universidad Católica	Estadio Nacional, Santiago
	Gálvez 24'		53' Aravena	Attendance: 28,431; Referee: V. Ojeda

12 April 1984	Universidad de Chile	0 – 1	Magallanes	Estadio Nacional, Santiago
			35' Toro	Attendance: 16,652; Referee: S. Vásquez

12 April 1984	Universidad Católica	0 – 0	Cobreloa	Estadio Nacional, Santiago
				Attendance: 16,652; Referee: J. Silvagno

15 April 1984	Universidad de Chile	3 – 0	Cobreloa	Estadio Nacional, Santiago
	Gálvez 28', 88'; Castec 43'			Attendance: 20,182; Referee: R. Barreto

15 April 1984	Universidad Católica	1 – 3	Magallanes	Estadio Nacional, Santiago
	Neira 82'		50' Jáuregui; 71' Santander; 78' Villazón	Attendance: 20,182; Referee: H. Silva

Pos	Team	Pld	W	D	L	GF	GA	GD	Pts	Qualification
1	Magallanes	3	2	0	1	4	2	+2	4	Qualified to 1985 Copa Libertadores
2	Universidad de Chile	3	1	1	1	4	2	+2	3	
3	Cobreloa	3	1	1	1	1	3	−2	3	
4	Universidad Católica	3	0	2	1	2	4	−2	2	

Source: rsssf.com

== See also ==
- 1983 Copa Polla Gol
- 1983 Copa República
