= Sergio Villegas =

Chilean footballer

Personal information
- Full name: Sergio Mauricio Villegas Sánchez
- Date of birth: 2 October 1973 (age 53)
- Place of birth: Chile
- Height: 1.75 m (5 ft 9 in)
- Positions: Defender; midfielder

Youth career
- Colo-Colo

Senior career*
Years	Team	Apps	(Gls)
1991–1996	Colo-Colo	6	(0)
1995	→ Ñublense (loan)	24	(0)
1997	Deportes Puerto Montt	2	(0)
1997	Ñublense	10	(0)
1998	Minervén		
1999	O'Higgins	17	(0)
2000–2001	Coquimbo Unido	2	(0)

International career
1992	Chile U20		
- * Club domestic league appearances and goals

Sergio Mauricio Villegas Sánchez (born 2 October 1973) is a Chilean former footballer who played as a midfielder for clubs in Chile and Venezuela.

== Career ==
A product of Colo-Colo youth system, Villegas made his debut in the 1991 Copa Chile. At league level, he made six appearances in 1996.

In his homeland, he also played for Ñublense, Deportes Puerto Montt, O'Higgins, where he came alongside Carlos Vega, with whom he also coincided in Colo-Colo and Deportes Puerto Montt, and Coquimbo Unido, where he retired in 2001.

Abroad, he played for Venezuelan side Minervén in 1998.

== International career ==
Villegas represented Chile at under-20 level in the 1992 South American Championship, alongside players such as Francisco Rojas, Marcelo Salas and Clarence Acuña.

== After football ==
He served as both Director (2002–08) and Secretary (2008–16) of SIFUP, the trade union of professional football players in Chile, with Carlos Soto as President.
