= 1994 Copa Chile =

Tournament details
- Country: Chile
- Teams: 32

Final positions
- Champions: Colo-Colo
- Runners-up: O'Higgins

Tournament statistics
- Top goal scorer(s): Tied at 12 goals: Alejandro Glaría, Marcelo Salas

The 1994 Copa Chile was the 24th edition of the Chilean Cup tournament. The competition started on March 5, 1994, and concluded on August 24, 1994. Colo-Colo won the competition for their fourth time, beating O'Higgins on penalties in the final.

== Calendar ==
Round	Date
Group Round	5 March 1994; 24 April 1994
Second round	15–18 June 1994
Quarterfinals	25–29 June 1994
Semi-finals	26 July 1994; 10 August 1994
Final	24 August 1994

== Group Round ==
Key to colours in group tables
Teams that progressed to the second round

=== Group 1 ===
	DANT	DARI	CSAL	CLOA	DIQU
D. Antofagasta		6–0	3–0	3–0	2–0
D. Arica	1–2		3–1	0–1	2–1
Cobresal	3–2	0–0		1–3	1–2
Cobreloa	3–0	3–2	2–1		5–3
D. Iquique	2–1	4–3	0–0	3–0	

Rank	Team	Points
1	Cobreloa	15
2	Deportes Antofagasta	13
3	Deportes Iquique	12
4	Deportes Arica	5
5	Cobresal	4

==== Intergroup scores (groups 1-2) ====
CSAL	0-1	RATA	1-0
DOVA	2-2	CLOA	4-0
DIQU	1-0	COQU	0-0
DLSE	1-1	DANT	1-0
ULCA	2-1	DARI	0-3

=== Group 2 ===
	RATA	COQU	DLSE	DOVA	ULCA
R. Atacama		1–0	2–0	1–0	4–1
Coquimbo U.	0–1		1–1	3–1	3–3
D. La Serena	1–2	0–0		2–0	1–1
D. Ovalle	2–1	1–1	1–1		2–1
U. La Calera	1–0	1–1	0–2	0–0	

Rank	Team	Points
1	Regional Atacama	16
2	Unión La Calera	10
3	Deportes La Serena	9
4	Coquimbo Unido	8
5	Deportes Ovalle	8

=== Group 3 ===
	EVER	USFE	UCHI	UESP	SWAN
Everton		1–0	0–2	3–0	1–1
U. San Felipe	1–1		1–1	0–2	1–3
U. de Chile	3–1	4–1		4–0	4–2
U. Española	1–1	2–1	0–2		4–1
S. Wanderers	0–1	0–0	0–2	1–2	

Rank	Team	Points
1	Universidad de Chile	18
2	Unión Española	12
3	Everton	11
4	Santiago Wanderers	7
5	Unión San Felipe	4

==== Intergroup scores (groups 3-4) ====
COLO	1-1	UCHI	4-1
EVER	4-2	PALE	4-2
USFE	2-2	AUDI	3-1
UESP	1-0	UCAT	1-1
SWAN	2-2	DMEL	0-2

=== Group 4 ===
	AUDI	COLO	PALE	DMEL	UCAT
Audax Italiano		3–4	1–2	1–0	0–1
Colo-Colo	1–1		3–2	4–1	1–1
Palestino	4–1	0–1		2–1	1–0
D. Melipilla	2–0	1–1	2–3		0–2
U. Católica	1–1	3–4	2–1	1–1	

Rank	Team	Points
1	Colo-Colo	14
2	Palestino	12
3	Universidad Católica	10
4	Audax Italiano	7
5	Deportes Melipilla	5

=== Group 5 ===
	DCOL	HUAC	OHIG	ÑUBL	RANG	USCR
D. Colchagua		0–1	0–0	1–2	2–0	1–0
Huachipato	4–1		0–0	4–0	1–2	2–0
O'Higgins	1–1	2–1		3–1	1–1	1–0
Ñublense	2–2	0–0	2–1		1–0	4–5
Rangers	1–0	0–0	3–1	3–2		1–0
U. Santa Cruz	2–2	2–1	2–2	2–1	2–1	

Rank	Team	Points
1	Rangers	13
2	Huachipato	11
3	O'Higgins	11
4	Unión Santa Cruz	10
5	Deportes Colchagua	8
6	Ñublense	7

=== Group 6 ===
	POSO	DCON	DPMO	DTEM	LSCH	FVIA
P. Osorno		0–1	0–0	1–1	2–0	1–1
D. Concepción	1–0		1–1	3–2	1–2	2–1
D. Puerto Montt	1–1	0–2		1–1	0–0	0–0
D. Temuco	0–1	2–2	1–2		1–1	1–0
Lota S.	0–1	1–2	0–1	1–1		2–4
F. Vial	0–2	2–0	0–0	4–2	4–0	

Rank	Team	Points
1	Deportes Concepción	14
2	Provincial Osorno	12
3	Fernández Vial	11
4	Deportes Puerto Montt	11
5	Deportes Temuco	7
6	Lota Schwager	5

== Second round ==
Team 1	Agg.	Team 2	1st leg	2nd leg
Huachipato	2–5	Colo-Colo	1–3	1–2
Everton	4–2	Deportes La Serena	1–1	3–1
Unión La Calera	1–8	Cobreloa	1–3	0–5
Provincial Osorno	1–3	Rangers	1–3	0–0
Fernández Vial	0–4	Universidad de Chile	0–0	0–4
Deportes Antofagasta	6–5	Unión Española	4–1	2–4
O'Higgins	3–2	Deportes Concepción	1–0	2–2
Deportes Iquique	3–6	Regional Atacama	3–1	0–5

== Quarterfinals ==
Team 1	Agg.	Team 2	1st leg	2nd leg
Rangers	1–3	Colo-Colo	1–0	0–3
O'Higgins	5–3	Everton	2–1	3–2
Deportes Antofagasta	4–3	Cobreloa	3–2	1–1
Universidad de Chile	6–3	Regional Atacama	5–0	1–3

== Semifinals ==
July 26, 1994

O'Higgins	3 – 3	Universidad de Chile
Riveros 5', 47'; Moyano 23'		Guevara 29'; Mardones 38'; Salas 55' (pen.)

Estadio El Teniente, Rancagua
Attendance: 4,582
Referee: E. Marín

August 4, 1994

Deportes Antofagasta	0 – 2	Colo-Colo
		Ramírez 47'; Tapia 53'

Estadio Regional, Antofagasta
Attendance: 13,000
Referee: H. Silva

August 4, 1994

Universidad de Chile	1 – 2	O'Higgins
Salas 65'		Moyano 45'; Soto 89'

Estadio Nacional, Santiago
Attendance: 25,900
Referee: S. Imperatore

August 10, 1994

Colo-Colo	3 – 1	Deportes Antofagasta
Toninho 36', 84'; Yáñez 73'		Arturi 63'

Estadio Monumental D. Arellano, Santiago
Attendance: 8,147
Referee: M. Sanchez

== Final ==
August 24, 1994

Colo-Colo	1 – 1	O'Higgins
Vega 40'		Molina 71'
Penalties
Ramírez (penalty scored); Vega (penalty missed); Reyes (penalty scored); Toninho (penalty missed); Etcheverry (penalty scored)	3 – 2	(penalty missed) Meléndez; (penalty scored) J. Díaz; (penalty scored) Chacón; (penalty missed) Illesca; (penalty missed) W. Rojas

Estadio Nacional, Santiago
Attendance: 31,371
Referee: H. Silva

== Top goalscorers ==
- Alejandro Glaría (Cobreloa) 12 goals
- Marcelo Salas (U. de Chile) 12 goals

== See also ==
- 1994 Campeonato Nacional
- Primera B
