= Roberto Corro =

Argentine footballer

Personal information
- Full name: Roberto Jaime Corro
- Date of birth: 7 August 1956 (age 70)
- Place of birth: Morón, Buenos Aires, Argentina
- Position: Forward

Senior career*
Years	Team	Apps	(Gls)
1977–1985	Argentino Peñarol		
1979	→ Kimberley MdP (loan)	10	(2)
1980	→ San Lorenzo (loan)	12	(3)
1981–1984	→ Unión San Vicente (loan)	25	(7)
1984–1985	→ Estudiantes RC (loan)	6	(0)
1985	→ Racing de Córdoba (loan)	9	(3)
1986–1989	Deportivo Maipú	117	(30)
1989–1990	Unión Española	31	(7)
1991–1992	Coquimbo Unido	43	(6)
1993–1995	Regional Atacama	75	(9)
1996–1997	Deportes Arica		
1998	Regional Atacama		
- * Club domestic league appearances and goals

Roberto Jaime Corro (born 7 August 1956) is an Argentine former footballer who played as a forward.

== Playing career ==
Born in Morón, Buenos Aires, Argentina, Corro trialed with several football clubs until he joined Argentino Peñarol in 1977. From 1979 to 1985, he was loaned out to Kimberley de Mar del Plata, San Lorenzo, Unión San Vicente, Estudiantes de Río Cuarto and Racing de Córdoba, all of them in the Argentine Primera División.

From 1986 to 1989, Corro played for Deportivo Maipú. He was part of the squad that got promotion to Primera B Nacional by first time in 1986.

In 1989, Corro moved to Chile and spent seasons with Unión Española, Coquimbo Unido, Regional Atacama and Deportes Arica. He was part of the Coquimbo Unido squad that became the 1991 Primera División runner-up and took part in the 1992 Copa Libertadores, the first time for them.

He retired playing for Regional Atacama, aged 42.

== Post-retirement ==
Corro settled in Copiapó, Chile, naturalized Chilean by residence and worked in mining.
