= 1987 Copa Lan Chile =

Tournament details
- Country: Chile

The 1987 Copa Lan Chile was the 17th edition of the Chilean Cup tournament. The competition started on February 28, 1987, and concluded on July 22, 1987. Only first level teams took part in the tournament. Cobresal won the competition for their first time, beating Colo-Colo 2–0 in the final.

== Calendar ==
Round	Date
Group Round	28 February 1987; 7 June 1987
Final	22 July 1987

== Group Round ==
Key to colours in group tables
Teams that progressed to the Final

=== Group North ===
	CLOA	CSAL	EVER	DIQU	PALE	SLUI	UCAT	UCHI
Cobreloa		1–2	1–0	2–1	3–2	1–1	0–0	2–0
Cobresal	2–0		4–1	4–1	3–0	3–0	2–0	0–1
Everton	2–2	2–1		2–1	4–0	3–1	1–1	0–1
D. Iquique	1–1	1–1	0–1		1–0	0–0	0–2	2–2
Palestino	1–1	2–2	0–2	0–0		3–1	1–6	1–1
San Luis	0–0	0–0	2–1	0–0	1–0		1–1	0–0
U. Católica	2–0	1–1	2–2	5–1	2–1	3–1		1–1
U. de Chile	1–2	0–0	4–1	2–1	1–0	2–3	1–1	

Rank	Team	Points
1	Cobresal	19 (+15)
2	Universidad Católica	19 (+14)
3	Universidad de Chile	16 (+3)
4	Cobreloa	16 (+1)
5	Everton	15
6	San Luis	13
7	Deportes Iquique	8
8	Palestino	6

=== Group South ===
	COLO	DCON	FVIA	HUAC	LOTA	NAVA	RANG	UESP
Colo-Colo		1–1	2–1	3–1	1–0	0–0	2–1	7–1
D. Concepción	0–0		2–3	2–3	0–0	2–0	2–0	0–1
F. Vial	0–0	4–3		3–1	1–2	0–3	2–1	0–0
Huachipato	0–0	0–0	1–1		4–1	1–2	3–0	1–0
Lota S.	1–2	3–0	3–3	0–0		0–0	3–1	2–2
Naval	3–3	1–1	3–2	1–1	0–0		2–1	2–0
Rangers	3–0	0–2	3–1	1–0	0–2	1–1		3–1
U. Española	0–0	5–1	3–2	2–0	0–2	3–4	1–1	

Rank	Team	Points
1	Colo-Colo	19 (+9)
2	Naval	19 (+7)
3	Lota Schwager	16
4	Huachipato	13
5	Fernández Vial	12 (−4)
6	Unión Española	12 (−6)
7	Deportes Concepción	11
8	Rangers	10

== Final ==
July 22, 1987

Cobresal	2 – 0	Colo-Colo
Zamorano 54'; Salgado 58'

Estadio Regional, Antofagasta
Attendance: 13,148
Referee: V. Ojeda

== Top goalscorer ==
- Iván Zamorano (Cobresal) 13 goals

== See also ==
- 1987 Campeonato Nacional
