= 1958 Copa Chile =

Chilean football tournament

- Colo-Colo, 1958 Copa Chile champion.

Tournament details
- Country: Chile

The 1958 Copa Chile was the first edition of the Chilean Cup tournament. The competition started on November 5, 1958, and concluded on December 20, 1958. Colo-Colo won the competition by goal average over the entire tournament, after drawing with Universidad Católica on the final.

Matches were scheduled to be played at the stadium of the team named first on the date specified for each round.

== Calendar ==
Round	Date
First round	5 November 1958; 8 December 1958
Second round	11 December 1959
Quarterfinals	13–14 December 1958
Semifinals	17 December 1958
Finals	20 December 1958

== First round ==
Teams			Scores	
Team #1	Agg.	Team #2	1st leg	2nd leg
Selección Osorno	0–7	Audax Italiano	0–3	0–4
Naval	3–0	Unión Española	3–0	w.o.
Deportivo San Fernando	3–1	O'Higgins	1–0	2–1
Alianza de Curicó	3–2	Santiago Wanderers	2–1	1–1
Universidad Técnica	2–6	Everton	1–3	1–3
Rangers	5–2	Iberia	3–1	2–1
Green Cross	1–2	Fernández Vial	1–2	w.o.
Colo-Colo	9–1	Selección Temuco	5–1	4–1
Universidad Católica	8–2	Trasandino	4–2	4–0
Palestino	5–4	Selección Iquique	3–3	2–1
Unión San Felipe	2–1	Magallanes	0–1	2–0
Santiago Morning	9–3	Selección Valdivia	5–0	4–3
San Bernardo Central	7–4	Ferrobádminton	5–2	2–2
Deportes La Serena	7–3	Selección Tocopilla	5–2	2–1
Unión La Calera	3–2	Universidad de Chile	2–1	1–1
San Luis	8–2	Selección de Peñaflor	6–1	2–1

== Second round ==
Home team	Score	Away team
Unión Española	3–2	Green Cross
Colo-Colo	4–3	Santiago Morning
Rangers	2–0	Deportivo San Fernando
Everton	2–1	Unión San Felipe
San Luis	2–0	Unión La Calera
Deportes La Serena	3–2	Alianza de Curicó
Universidad Católica	5–1	Palestino
Audax Italiano	5–1	San Bernardo Central

== Quarterfinals ==
Home team	Score	Away team
Universidad Católica	3–1	Audax Italiano
Colo-Colo	7–2	Unión Española
Deportes La Serena	3–4	Everton
San Luis	3–0	Rangers

== Semifinals ==
December 17, 1958

Universidad Católica	3 – 2	San Luis
Espinoza 42'; Godoy 64', 81'		17' López; 52' Millas

Estadio Nacional, Santiago
Attendance: 12,966
Referee: J. Silva

December 17, 1958

Colo-Colo	5 – 0	Everton
Moreno 25'; Hormazábal 27'; J. Soto 56'; Morales 72' (o.g.); Álvarez 77'

Estadio Nacional, Santiago
Attendance: 12,966
Referee: C. Robles

== Third-place match ==
December 20, 1958

Everton	3 – 1	San Luis
Morales 51'; Rolón 80'; Sierra 84'		5' Ortiz

Estadio Nacional, Santiago
Attendance: 22,752
Referee: D. Morales

== Final ==
December 20, 1958

Colo-Colo	2 – 2	Universidad Católica
Álvarez 6'; Moreno 69'		15', 77' M. Soto

Estadio Nacional, Santiago
Attendance: 22,752
Referee: S. Julio

Colo-Colo won by average goal over the tournament; GF:27, GA:9, 3.0 goal average; U. Católica GF:21, GA:8, 2.63 goal average

== Top goalscorers ==
- Adolfo Godoy (Universidad Católica) 7 goals
- Máximo Rolón (Everton) 7 goals

== See also ==
- 1958 Campeonato Nacional
- Primera B
