= 1960 Copa Preparación =

Tournament details
- Country: Chile

Final positions
- Champions: Deportes La Serena
- Runners-up: Santiago Wanderers

The 1960 Copa Preparación was the third edition of the Chilean Cup tournament. The competition started on March 26, 1960, and concluded on May 1, 1960. Deportes La Serena won the competition for the first time, beating Santiago Wanderers 4–1 in the final.

Matches were scheduled to be played at the stadium of the team named first on the date specified for each round. If scores were level after 90 minutes had been played, an extra time took place. If at the end of these 30 minutes Extra time periods, the teams have scored an equal number of goals, a coin toss took place.

== Calendar ==
Round	Date
Group Round	26 March - 10 April 1960
Qualifying Playoff	13 April 1960
Quarterfinals	17 April 1960
Semifinals	24 April 1960
Final	1 May 1960

== Group round ==
=== Group 1 ===
Coquimbo U.	0–2	D. La Serena
Selec. Ovalle	0–2	Coquimbo U.
D. La Serena	6–1	Selec. Ovalle

Rank	Team	Points
1	Deportes La Serena	4
2	Coquimbo Unido	2
3	Selección Ovalle	0

=== Group 2 ===
Trasandino	0–2	S. Wanderers
S. Wanderers	4–1	San Luis
San Luis	2–2	Trasandino

Rank	Team	Points
1	Santiago Wanderers	4
2	Trasandino	1
3	San Luis	1

=== Group 3 ===
Everton	2–1	U. San Felipe
U. San Felipe	2–3	U. La Calera
U. La Calera	2–0	Everton

Rank	Team	Points
1	Unión La Calera	4
2	Everton	2
3	Unión San Felipe	0

=== Group 4 ===
Magallanes	0–2	S. Morning
U. de Chile	1–1	Magallanes
S. Morning	1–2	U. de Chile

Rank	Team	Points
1	Universidad de Chile	3
2	Santiago Morning	2
3	Magallanes	1

=== Group 5 ===
Colo-Colo	1–2	U. Católica
Green Cross	3–2	Colo-Colo
U. Católica	2–1	Green Cross

Rank	Team	Points
1	Universidad Católica	4
2	Green Cross	2
3	Colo-Colo	0

=== Group 6 ===
U. Técnica	0–2	Ferrobádminton
Audax I.	6–0	U. Técnica
Ferrobádminton	3–4	Audax I.

Rank	Team	Points
1	Audax Italiano	4
2	Ferrobádminton	2
3	Universidad Técnica	0

=== Group 7 ===
Palestino	0–0	Iberia
U. Española	1–1	Palestino
Iberia	2–3	U. Española

Rank	Team	Points
1	Unión Española	3
2	Palestino	2
3	Iberia	1

=== Group 8 ===
San Bernardo C.	2–4	D. Colchagua
O'Higgins	3–0	San Bernardo C.
D. Colchagua	1–0	O'Higgins

Rank	Team	Points
1	Deportes Colchagua	4
2	O'Higgins	2
3	San Bernardo Central	0

=== Group 9 ===
Alianza	0–3	Rangers
Ñublense	2–0	Alianza
Rangers	2–3	Ñublense

Rank	Team	Points
1	Ñublense	4
2	Rangers	2
3	Alianza de Curicó	0

== Qualifying Playoff ==
Between winners groups 8 and 9

Home team	Score	Away team
Deportes Colchagua	0–1	Ñublense

== Quarterfinals ==
Home team	Score	Away team
Deportes La Serena	6–0	Universidad Católica
Santiago Wanderers	2–2 (ct)	Universidad de Chile
Audax Italiano	5–3	Unión Española
Ñublense	1–1 (ct)	Unión La Calera

== Semifinals ==
April 24, 1960

Santiago Wanderers	2 – 0	Unión La Calera
Méndez 57'; Zuleta 56' (o.g.)

Estadio Sausalito, Viña del Mar
Attendance: 2,272
Referee: S. Bustamante

April 24, 1960

Audax Italiano	2 – 3	Deportes La Serena
R. Cortés 52' (pen.); Vargas 67'		Aravena 12'; Pinnola 15', 60'

Estadio Nacional, Santiago
Attendance: 3,336
Referee: L. Cantillana

== Final ==
May 1, 1960

Deportes La Serena	4 – 1	Santiago Wanderers
Sulantay 11', 66'; Boazalla 44' (o.g.); Farías 56' (pen.)		Salinas 45+'

Estadio La Portada, La Serena
Attendance: 9,259
Referee: D. Santos

== Top goalscorers ==
- José Sulantay (D. La Serena) 7 goals,
- Juan Pinnola (D. La Serena) 7 goals

== See also ==
- 1960 Campeonato Nacional
- Primera B
