= Campeonato de Apertura (Chile) =

Football tournament in Chile

- Founded: 1933
- Abolished: 1950
- Region: South America
- Related competitions: Copa Chile
- Most championships: Colo-Colo, Santiago Morning

The Campeonato de Apertura (Opening Championship) was an annual competition for Chilean football teams at the beginning of the season. It was played from 1933 to 1950, but didn't have regularity through years, not being played in 1935, 1936, 1939, 1943, 1945, 1946 and 1948. The Campeonato de Apertura was sometimes disputed in a knock-out system, other times in a mini-league system. It is considered as the precursor of Copa Chile, Chile's official cup competition that started in 1958.

Nowadays, there are in Chilean football two national league competitions per year, one of them called Torneo de Apertura (Opening Tournament). In spite of its name, it has nothing to do with the former Campeonato initiated in 1933.

== Finals ==
Ed.	Year	Champion	Scores	Runner-up	Trophy
1	1933	Colo-Colo	2–1	Unión Española	Copa Cesar Seoane
2	1934	Santiago	4–2	Colo-Colo	Copa Apertura
3	1937	Magallanes	2–0	Audax Italiano	Copa Apertura Aliviol
4	1938	Colo-Colo	3–1	Audax Italiano	Copa Apertura
5	1940	Colo-Colo	3–2	Universidad de Chile	Copa Apertura
6	1941	Audax Italiano	2–1	Magallanes	Copa Apertura
7	1942	Santiago National	2–1	Badminton	Copa Apertura
8	1944	Santiago Morning	1–1	Audax Italiano	Copa Jaime Rodríguez
9	1947	Unión Española	2–0	Iberia	Copa Preparación
10	1949	Santiago Morning	1–0	Santiago Wanderers	Copa Preparación
11	1950	Santiago Morning	3–2	Audax Italiano	Copa Carlos Varela

== Titles by club ==
Club	Titles	Runners-up	Seasons won	Seasons runner-up
Colo-Colo	3	1	1933, 1938, 1940	1934
Santiago Morning	3	—	1944, 1949, 1950	—
Audax Italiano	1	4	1941	1937, 1938, 1944, 1950
Magallanes	1	1	1937	1941
Unión Española	1	1	1947	1933
Santiago National	1	—	1942	—
Santiago	1	—	1934	—
Badminton	—	1	—	1942
Iberia	—	1	—	1947
Santiago Wanderers	—	1	—	1949
Universidad de Chile	—	1	—	1940

== Torneo de Consuelo del Campeonato de Apertura de Chile ==
=== Finals ===
Ed.	Year	Champion	Scores	Runner-up	Trophy
1	1933	Santiago Badminton	4–2	Morning Star	Trofeo Compañía Chilena de Electricidad
2	1934	Universidad Católica	3–2	Badminton	

== Notes and references ==
- Chile Cup - RSSSF
