= Club Deportivo Universidad Católica in international football =

Football club in international competitions

Universidad Católica in international football
- Club: Club Deportivo Universidad Católica
- Most appearances: Mario Lepe (76 in Copa Libertadores); Cristopher Toselli (27 in Copa Sudamericana)
- Top scorer: Alberto Acosta (19)
- First entry: 1962 Copa Libertadores
- Latest entry: 2026 Copa Libertadores

Club Deportivo Universidad Católica is a Chilean professional association football club based in Santiago. In international competitions, have won a 1 trophies; Copa Interamericana (1994). In 1993, Universidad Católica was the runner-up in the most important international tournament in South America: the Copa Libertadores de América, losing in the finals against the biggest club in Brazil and defending Libertadores' Champion São Paulo. Universidad Católica has reached semi-finals in the Copa Libertadores four times (years 1962, 1966, 1969 and 1984).

== Records ==
- Most appearances in Copa Libertadores de América: Mario Lepe, 76
- Most appearances in Copa Sudamericana: Cristopher Toselli, 27
- Most goals in South America competition: Alberto Acosta, 19
- Biggest win: Universidad Católica 6–0 Mineros de Guayana, in the Copa Libertadores, 25 February 1997 and Universidad Católica 6–0 Minervén S.C., in the Copa Libertadores, 4 March 1997
- Biggest defeat: Universidad Católica 2–7 Emelec, in the Copa Libertadores 22 February 1962)

=== By season ===
Key

- Pld = Played
- W = Games won
- D = Games drawn
- L = Games lost
- GF = Goals for
- GA = Goals against
- GD = Goal difference
- Grp = Group stage
- R1 = First round
- R2 = Second round
- R3 = Third round
- R4 = Fourth round
- R16 = Round of 16
- R32 = Round of 32
- QF = Quarter-final
- SF = Semi-final

Key to colours:

Gold	Winners
Silver	Runners-up

CD Universidad Católica record in South America football by season
Season	Competition	Pld	W	D	L	GF	GA	Round	Ref
1962	Copa Libertadores	6	2	2	2	11	11	SF	
1966	Copa Libertadores	10	4	3	3	13	10	SF	
1967	Copa Libertadores	12	5	3	4	19	16	Grp	
1968	Copa Libertadores	10	5	1	4	17	17	QF	
1969	Copa Libertadores	14	7	1	6	27	24	SF	
1984	Copa Libertadores	9	4	2	3	12	9	SF	
1986	Copa Libertadores	6	0	1	5	5	13	Grp	
1988	Copa Libertadores	8	4	4	0	10	5	R16	
1990	Copa Libertadores	10	3	5	2	14	12	QF	
1992	Copa Libertadores	10	2	6	2	15	9	R16	
1993	Copa Libertadores	14	8	3	3	28	18	RU	
1994	Copa Interamericana	2	1	0	1	6	4	Winners	
1995	Copa Libertadores	9	4	1	4	17	19	R16	
1996	Copa Libertadores	6	1	1	4	6	13	Grp	
1997	Copa Libertadores	10	5	2	3	27	11	QF	
1998	Copa Libertadores	6	2	1	3	5	8	Grp	
1998	Copa Mercosur	6	1	3	2	6	9	R1	
1999	Copa Libertadores	8	3	3	2	12	10	R16	
1999	Copa Mercosur	6	1	0	5	2	13	R1	
2000	Copa Libertadores	6	1	1	4	10	14	Grp	
2000	Copa Mercosur	6	0	2	4	7	17	R1	
2001	Copa Mercosur	8	4	0	4	10	12	QF	
2002	Copa Libertadores	8	3	3	2	11	10	Grp	
2003	Copa Libertadores	6	1	1	4	7	12	Grp	
2003	Copa Sudamericana	4	2	0	2	5	7	R1	
2005	Copa Sudamericana	10	4	2	4	16	12	SF	
2006	Copa Libertadores	6	3	1	2	12	11	Grp	
2008	Copa Libertadores	6	3	0	3	6	6	Grp	
2008	Copa Sudamericana	6	2	3	1	11	5	R16	
2010	Copa Libertadores	8	2	4	2	10	10	Grp	
2011	Copa Libertadores	10	6	2	2	16	13	QF	
2011	Copa Sudamericana	6	2	3	1	7	5	R16	
2012	Copa Libertadores	6	1	3	2	6	11	Grp	
2012	Copa Sudamericana	10	4	4	2	15	11	SF	
2013	Copa Sudamericana	6	3	2	1	13	8	R16	
2014	Copa Sudamericana	2	0	0	2	0	4	R1	
2015	Copa Sudamericana	4	2	0	2	5	5	R2	
2016	Copa Sudamericana	2	0	1	1	2	4	R1	
2017	Copa Libertadores	6	1	2	3	8	11	Grp	
2019	Copa Libertadores	6	2	1	3	7	11	Grp	
2019	Copa Sudamericana	2	1	0	1	3	7	R2	
2020	Copa Libertadores	6	2	1	3	6	9	Grp	
2020	Copa Sudamericana	6	3	1	2	7	7	QF	
2021	Copa Libertadores	8	3	0	5	6	8	R16	
2022	Copa Libertadores	6	1	1	4	5	10	Grp	
2022	Copa Sudamericana	2	0	0	2	3	8	R16	
2023	Copa Sudamericana	1	0	0	1	2	3	R1	
2024	Copa Sudamericana	1	0	0	1	0	2	R1	
2025	Copa Sudamericana	1	0	1	0	1	1	R1	
2026	Copa Libertadores	6	4	1	1	8	4		

=== By competition ===
CD Universidad Católica record in international football by competition
Competition	Pld	W	D	L	GF	GA	Win%
Copa Libertadores	242	92	60	90	356	345	38.02
Copa Sudamericana	63	23	17	23	90	89	36.51
Copa Interamericana	2	1	0	1	6	4	50.00
Copa Mercosur	26	6	5	15	25	51	23.08
Total	333	122	82	129	477	489	36.64

As of 28 May 2026

== Matches ==
Season	Competition	Round	Opposition	Home (Note: Universidad Católica score listed first)	Away	Aggregate	Ref.
1962	Copa Libertadores	First round Group 3	(Ecuador) Emelec	3–0	2–7	1st	
1962	Copa Libertadores	First round Group 3	(Colombia) Millonarios	4–1	1-1	1st	
1962	Copa Libertadores	Semifinals	(Brazil) Santos	1-1	0–1	1–2	
1966	Copa Libertadores	First round Group 2	Universidad de Chile	2-2	0-0	1st	
1966	Copa Libertadores	First round Group 2	(Paraguay) Guaraní	2–0	1–3	1st	
1966	Copa Libertadores	First round Group 2	(Paraguay) Olimpia	0-0	4–0	1st	
1966	Copa Libertadores	Semifinals; Group B	(Uruguay) Peñarol	1–0	0–2	2nd	
1966	Copa Libertadores	Semifinals; Group B	(Uruguay) Nacional	1–0	2–3	2nd	
1967	Copa Libertadores	First round Group 3	(Chile) Colo-Colo	5–2	2–4	3rd	
1967	Copa Libertadores	First round Group 3	(Paraguay) Guaraní	1-1	1-1	3rd	
1967	Copa Libertadores	First round Group 3	(Paraguay) Cerro Porteño	3–1	0–1	3rd	
1967	Copa Libertadores	First round Group 3	(Ecuador) Emelec	1–0	1–2	3rd	
1967	Copa Libertadores	First round Group 3	(Ecuador) Barcelona	3–1	2–0	3rd	
1967	Copa Libertadores	First round Group 3	(Uruguay) Nacional	0–3	0-0	3rd	
1968	Copa Libertadores	First round Group 3	(Ecuador) El Nacional	2–0	1–2	1st	
1968	Copa Libertadores	First round Group 3	(Ecuador) Emelec	1-1	2–1	1st	
1968	Copa Libertadores	First round Group 3	Universidad de Chile	3–2	2–1	1st	
1968	Copa Libertadores	Second round Group C	(Paraguay) Guaraní	4–2	1–3	3rd	
1968	Copa Libertadores	Second round Group C	(Brazil) Palmeiras	0–1	1–4	3rd	
1969	Copa Libertadores	First round Group 2	(Chile) Santiago Wanderers	1–3	3–2	1st	
1969	Copa Libertadores	First round Group 2	(Peru) Juan Aurich	1–2	4–2	1st	
1969	Copa Libertadores	First round Group 2	(Peru) Sporting Cristal	3–2	0–2	1st	
1969	Copa Libertadores	Playoff	(Peru) Juan Aurich	4-1	—N/a	1st	
1969	Copa Libertadores	Playoff	(Peru) Sporting Cristal	—N/a	2-1	1st	
1969	Copa Libertadores	Second round Group 1	(Venezuela) Deportivo Italia	4–0	2–3	1st	
1969	Copa Libertadores	Second round Group 1	(Paraguay) Cerro Porteño	1–0	0-0	1st	
1969	Copa Libertadores	Semifinals	(Argentina) Estudiantes	1–3	1–3	2–6	
1984	Copa Libertadores	First round Group 2	(Chile) O'Higgins	2–0	2–0	1st	
1984	Copa Libertadores	First round Group 2	(Bolivia) Bolívar	3–1	2–3	1st	
1984	Copa Libertadores	First round Group 2	(Bolivia) Blooming	0-0	2–1	1st	
1984	Copa Libertadores	Semifinals; Group 1	(Argentina) Independiente	0-0	1–2	3rd	
1984	Copa Libertadores	Semifinals; Group 1	(Uruguay) Nacional	—N/a	0-2	3rd	
1986	Copa Libertadores	First round Group 2	(Chile) Cobresal	0–1	1-1	4th	
1986	Copa Libertadores	First round Group 2	(Colombia) América de Cali	1–3	1–2	4th	
1986	Copa Libertadores	First round Group 2	(Colombia) Deportivo Cali	1–3	1–3	4th	
1988	Copa Libertadores	First round Group 1	(Chile) Colo-Colo	1–0	2-2	1st	
1988	Copa Libertadores	First round Group 1	(Venezuela) Unión Atlético Táchira	3–1	1–0	1st	
1988	Copa Libertadores	First round Group 1	(Venezuela) Sport Marítimo	2–1	0-0	1st	
1988	Copa Libertadores	Second round	(Uruguay) Nacional	1-1	0-0	1–1 (Note: Lost on away goals)	
1990	Copa Libertadores	First round Group 3	(Chile) Colo-Colo	0-0	2–1	2nd	
1990	Copa Libertadores	First round Group 3	(Peru) Sporting Cristal	2–0	0-0	2nd	
1990	Copa Libertadores	First round Group 3	(Peru) Unión Huaral	2-2	0–1	2nd	
1990	Copa Libertadores	Second round	(Bolivia) The Strongest	3–1	1-1	4–2	
1990	Copa Libertadores	Quarter-final	(Paraguay) Olimpia	4-4	0–2	4–6	
1992	Copa Libertadores	Group 1	(Chile) Colo-Colo	0-0	1-1	2nd	
1992	Copa Libertadores	Group 1	(Chile) Coquimbo Unido	5–1	2–3	2nd	
1992	Copa Libertadores	Group 1	(Argentina) Newell's Old Boys	1-1	0-0	2nd	
1992	Copa Libertadores	Group 1	(Argentina) San Lorenzo	4–0	2-2	2nd	
1992	Copa Libertadores	Round of 16	(Colombia) América de Cali	0-0	0–1	0–1	
1993	Copa Libertadores	Group 2	(Chile) Cobreloa	1-1	1-1	1st	
1993	Copa Libertadores	Group 2	(Bolivia) Bolívar	3–0	1–3	1st	
1993	Copa Libertadores	Group 2	(Bolivia) San José	4–1	5–2	1st	
1993	Copa Libertadores	Round of 16	(Colombia) Atlético Nacional	2–0	1–2	3–2	
1993	Copa Libertadores	Quarter-final	(Ecuador) Barcelona	3–1	1–0	4–1	
1993	Copa Libertadores	Semifinal	(Colombia) América de Cali	1–0	2-2	3–2	
1993	Copa Libertadores	Final	(Brazil) São Paulo	2–0	1–5	3–5	
1994	Copa Interamericana	Final	(Costa Rica) Saprissa	5–1	1–3	5–4 (Note: Won on a.e.t.)	
1995	Copa Libertadores	Group 3	Universidad de Chile	2–0	1–4	3rd	
1995	Copa Libertadores	Group 3	(Colombia) Millonarios	4–1	1–5	3rd	
1995	Copa Libertadores	Group 3	(Colombia) Atlético Nacional	1-1	1–3	3rd	
1995	Copa Libertadores	Playoff	Universidad de Chile	—N/a	4-1		
1995	Copa Libertadores	Round of 16	(Argentina) River Plate	2–1	1–3	3–4	
1996	Copa Libertadores	Group 4	Universidad de Chile	0-0	0–2	4th	
1996	Copa Libertadores	Group 4	(Brazil) Botafogo	2–1	1–4	4th	
1996	Copa Libertadores	Group 4	(Brazil) Corinthians	2–3	1–3	4th	
1997	Copa Libertadores	Group 3	(Chile) Colo-Colo	2-2	0–2	2nd	
1997	Copa Libertadores	Group 3	(Venezuela) Mineros de Guayana	6–0	1-1	2nd	
1997	Copa Libertadores	Group 3	(Venezuela) Minervén	6–0	0–1	2nd	
1997	Copa Libertadores	Round of 16	(Bolivia) Oriente Petrolero	4–0	5–1	9–1	
1997	Copa Libertadores	Quarter-final	(Chile) Colo-Colo	2–1	1–3	3–4	
1998	Copa Libertadores	Group 3	(Chile) Colo-Colo	0–2	2–3	4th	
1998	Copa Libertadores	Group 3	(Paraguay) Cerro Porteño	1–0	0-0	4th	
1998	Copa Libertadores	Group 3	(Paraguay) Olimpia	2–1	0–2	4th	
1998	Copa Mercosur	Group E	(Brazil) Vasco da Gama	1-1	0–1	4th	
1998	Copa Mercosur	Group E	(Argentina) River Plate	2–0	1-1	4th	
1998	Copa Mercosur	Group E	(Brazil) Gremio	1-1	1–5	4th	
1999	Copa Libertadores	Group 4	(Chile) Colo-Colo	3–1	0–1	1st	
1999	Copa Libertadores	Group 4	(Peru) Sporting Cristal	1-1	1-1	1st	
1999	Copa Libertadores	Group 4	(Peru) Universitario	1–0	3–1	1st	
1999	Copa Libertadores	Round of 16	(Uruguay) Bella Vista	1–3	2-2	3–5	
1999	Copa Mercosur	Group C	(Argentina) San Lorenzo	1–0	0–4	4th	
1999	Copa Mercosur	Group C	(Brazil) São Paulo	0–3	0–2	4th	
1999	Copa Mercosur	Group C	(Argentina) Boca Juniors	1–3	0–1	4th	
2000	Copa Libertadores	Group 2	(Uruguay) Peñarol	1-1	1–5	4th	
2000	Copa Libertadores	Group 2	(Argentina) Boca Juniors	1–3	1–2	4th	
2000	Copa Libertadores	Group 2	(Bolivia) Blooming	5–0	1–3	4th	
2000	Copa Mercosur	Group B	(Brazil) Palmeiras	1–3	1-1	4th	
2000	Copa Mercosur	Group B	(Brazil) Cruzeiro	2–3	0–4	4th	
2000	Copa Mercosur	Group B	(Argentina) Independiente	3-3	0–3	4th	
2001	Copa Mercosur	Group A	(Brazil) Vasco da Gama	2–1	1–2	2nd	
2001	Copa Mercosur	Group A	(Paraguay) Cerro Porteño	1–0	0–2	2nd	
2001	Copa Mercosur	Group A	(Argentina) Boca Juniors	2–1	2–3	2nd	
2001	Copa Mercosur	Quarter-final	(Brazil) Corinthians	2–1	0–2	2–3	
2002	Copa Libertadores	Group 8	(Brazil) Flamengo	2–1	1–3	2nd	
2002	Copa Libertadores	Group 8	(Paraguay) Olimpia	0–1	1-1	2nd	
2002	Copa Libertadores	Group 8	(Colombia) Once Caldas	3–1	0–3	2nd	
2002	Copa Libertadores	Round of 16	(Brazil) São Caetano	1-1	1-1	2–2 (Note: Lost 2–4 on penalties)	
2003	Copa Libertadores	Group 2	(Paraguay) Cerro Porteño	2–1	2–3	4th	
2003	Copa Libertadores	Group 2	(Peru) Sporting Cristal	0–1	1–3	4th	
2003	Copa Libertadores	Group 2	(Brazil) Paysandu	1-1	1–3	4th	
2003	Copa Sudamericana	Preliminary	(Chile) Provincial Osorno	0–1	2–1	2–2 (Note: Lost 4–5 on penalties)	
2003	Copa Sudamericana	Second round	(Peru) Cienciano	3–1	0–4	3–5	
2005	Copa Sudamericana	First round	Universidad de Chile	1–0	2–1	2–2 (Note: Won on away goals)	
2005	Copa Sudamericana	Second round	(Peru) Alianza Atlético	5–0	0–2	5–2	
2005	Copa Sudamericana	Round of 16	(United States) D.C. United	3–2	1-1	4–3	
2005	Copa Sudamericana	Quarter-final	(Brazil) Fluminense	2–0	1–2	3–2	
2005	Copa Sudamericana	Semifinal	(Argentina) Boca Juniors	0–1	2-2	2–3	
2006	Copa Libertadores	Group 4	(Mexico) Tigres	3–2	0–1	3rd	
2006	Copa Libertadores	Group 4	(Brazil) Corinthians	2–3	2-2	3rd	
2006	Copa Libertadores	Group 4	(Colombia) Deportivo Cali	2–1	3–2	3rd	
2008	Copa Libertadores	Group 5	(Mexico) América	2–0	1–2	3rd	
2008	Copa Libertadores	Group 5	(Peru) Universidad San Martín	1–0	1–0	3rd	
2008	Copa Libertadores	Group 5	(Argentina) River Plate	1–2	0–2	3rd	
2008	Copa Sudamericana	Preliminary	(Uruguay) River Plate	4–0	0–2	4–2	
2008	Copa Sudamericana	First round	(Paraguay) Olimpia	4–0	2-2	6–2	
2008	Copa Sudamericana	Round of 16	(Brazil) Internacional	1-1	0-0	1–1	
2010	Copa Libertadores	First round	(Argentina) Colón	3–2	2–3	5–5 (Note: Won 5–3 on penalties)	
2010	Copa Libertadores	Group 8	(Brazil) Flamengo	2–0	0–2	3rd	
2010	Copa Libertadores	Group 8	Universidad de Chile	2-2	0-0	3rd	
2010	Copa Libertadores	Group 8	(Venezuela) Caracas	1-1	0-0	3rd	
2011	Copa Libertadores	Group 4	(Chile) Unión Española	2–1	2-2	1st	
2011	Copa Libertadores	Group 4	(Argentina) Vélez Sarsfield	0-0	4–3	1st	
2011	Copa Libertadores	Group 4	(Venezuela) Caracas	1–3	2–0	1st	
2011	Copa Libertadores	Round of 16	(Brazil) Grêmio	1–0	1–2	3–1	
2011	Copa Libertadores	Quarter-final	(Uruguay) Peñarol	2–1	0–2	2–3	
2011	Copa Sudamericana	First round	(Uruguay) Bella Vista	3–0	1-1	4–1	
2011	Copa Sudamericana	Second round	(Chile) Deportes Iquique	2–1	0-0	2–1	
2011	Copa Sudamericana	Round of 16	(Argentina) Vélez Sarsfield	0–2	1-1	1–3	
2012	Copa Libertadores	Group 3	(Bolivia) Bolívar	1-1	0–3	4th	
2012	Copa Libertadores	Group 3	(Colombia) Junior	2-2	0–3	4th	
2012	Copa Libertadores	Group 3	(Chile) Unión Española	2–1	1-1	4th	
2012	Copa Sudamericana	First round	(Bolivia) Blooming	3–0	1-1	4–1	
2012	Copa Sudamericana	Second round	(Colombia) Deportes Tolima	2–0	1–3	3–3	
2012	Copa Sudamericana	Round of 16	(Brazil) Atlético Goianiense	2–0	1–3	3–3	
2012	Copa Sudamericana	Quarter-final	(Argentina) Independiente	2–1	2-2	4–3	
2012	Copa Sudamericana	Semifinal	(Brazil) São Paulo	1-1	0-0	1–1	
2013	Copa Sudamericana	First round	(Paraguay) Cerro Porteño	1-1	1–0	2–1	
2013	Copa Sudamericana	Second round	(Ecuador) Emelec	4–0	3–2	7–2	
2013	Copa Sudamericana	Round of 16	(Brazil) São Paulo	3–4	1-1	4–5	
2014	Copa Sudamericana	First round	(Uruguay) River Plate	0–1	0–3	0–4	
2015	Copa Sudamericana	First round	(Uruguay) Danubio	1–0	2–1	3–1	
2015	Copa Sudamericana	Second round	(Paraguay) Libertad	2–3	0–1	2–4	
2016	Copa Sudamericana	First round	(Bolivia) Real Potosí	1-1	1–3	2–4	
2017	Copa Libertadores	Group 4	(Brazil) Atlético Paranaense	2–3	2-2	4th	
2017	Copa Libertadores	Group 4	(Brazil) Flamengo	1–0	1–3	4th	
2017	Copa Libertadores	Group 4	(Argentina) San Lorenzo	1-1	1–2	4th	
2019	Copa Libertadores	Group H	(Paraguay) Libertad	2–3	1–4	3rd	
2019	Copa Libertadores	Group H	(Argentina) Rosario Central	2–1	1-1	3rd	
2019	Copa Libertadores	Group H	(Brazil) Grêmio	1–0	0–2	3rd	
2019	Copa Sudamericana	Second round	(Ecuador) Independiente del Valle	3–2	0–5	3–7	
2020	Copa Libertadores	Group E	(Brazil) Internacional	2–1	0–3	3rd	
2020	Copa Libertadores	Group E	(Colombia) América de Cali	1–2	1-1	3rd	
2020	Copa Libertadores	Group E	(Brazil) Grêmio	2–0	0–2	3rd	
2020	Copa Sudamericana	Second round	(Paraguay) Sol de América	2–1	0-0	2–1	
2020	Copa Sudamericana	Round of 16	(Uruguay) River Plate	0–1	2–1	2–2	
2020	Copa Sudamericana	Quarter-final	(Argentina) Vélez Sarsfield	1–3	2–1	3–4	
2021	Copa Libertadores	Group F	(Colombia) Atlético Nacional	2–0	0–2	2nd	
2021	Copa Libertadores	Group F	(Argentina) Argentinos Juniors	0–2	1–0	2nd	
2021	Copa Libertadores	Group F	(Uruguay) Nacional	3–1	0–1	2nd	
2021	Copa Libertadores	Round of 16	(Brazil) Palmeiras	0–1	0–1	0–2	
2022	Copa Libertadores	Group H	(Argentina) Talleres	0–1	0–1	3rd	
2022	Copa Libertadores	Group H	(Peru) Sporting Cristal	2–1	1-1	3rd	
2022	Copa Libertadores	Group H	(Brazil) Flamengo	2–3	0–3	3rd	
2022	Copa Sudamericana	Round of 16	(Brazil) São Paulo	2–4	1–4	3–8	
2023	Copa Sudamericana	First round	(Chile) Audax Italiano	—N/a	2-3		
2024	Copa Sudamericana	First round	(Chile) Coquimbo Unido	0-2	—N/a		
2025	Copa Sudamericana	First round	(Chile) Palestino	1-1	—N/a	1–1	
2026	Copa Libertadores	Group D	(Argentina) Boca Juniors	1–2	0–1	1st	
2026	Copa Libertadores	Group D	(Brazil) Cruzeiro	0-0	1–2	1st	
2026	Copa Libertadores	Group D	(Ecuador) Barcelona	2–0	1–2	1st	
2026	Copa Libertadores	Round of 16	(Argentina) Estudiantes	vs.	vs.		
