= Ramón Isasi =

Paraguayan footballer (born 1959)

Personal information
- Full name: Juan Ramón Isasi Colmán
- Date of birth: 22 September 1959 (age 67)
- Place of birth: Asunción, Paraguay
- Position: Forward

Senior career*
Years	Team	Apps	(Gls)
1978	Nacional		
1978–1979	Rubio Ñu		
1980–1982	Sol de América		
1982–1984	Universidad Católica	61	(22)
1985	Guaraní	3	(0)
1986	Universidad Católica	12	(4)

International career
1979	Paraguay U20		
1980	Paraguay	1	(0)
- * Club domestic league appearances and goals

Juan Ramón Isasi Colmán (born 22 September 1959) is a Paraguayan former footballer who played as a forward.

== Career ==
Isasi played for most of his career in Universidad Católica. He was part of the 1984 Universidad Católica team that won the Primera División de Chile. He also won the 1983 Copa Polla Gol and the 1983 Copa República.

== Titles ==
Season	Team	Title
1984	(Chile) Universidad Católica	Primera División de Chile
