= Víctor Mancilla =

Chilean footballer

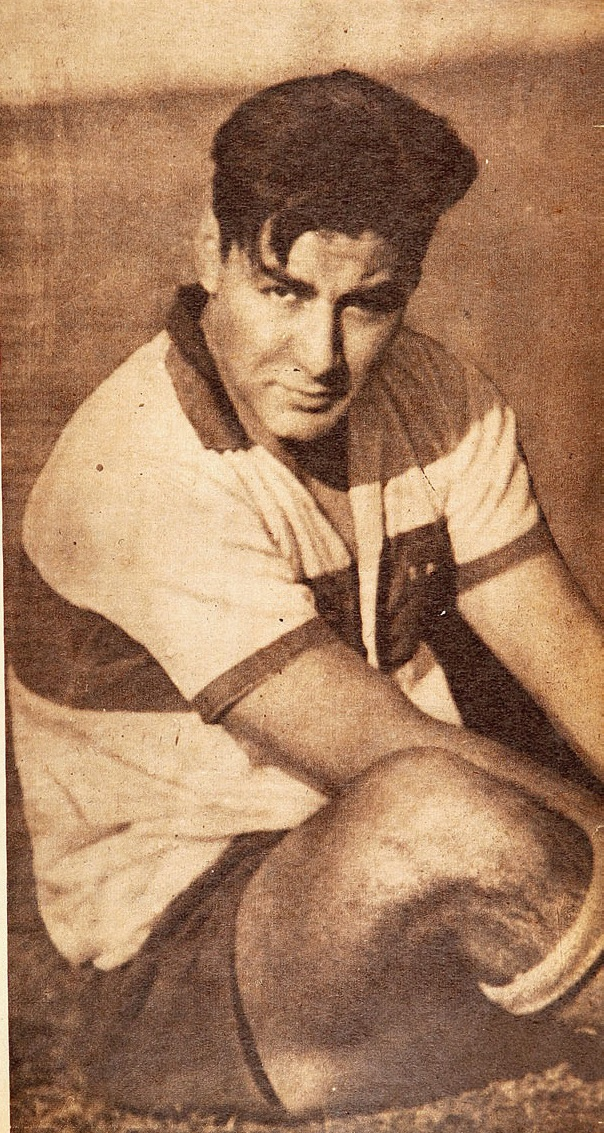

Personal information
- Full name: Víctor Mancilla Martínez
- Position: Forward

Senior career*
| Years | Team | Apps | (Gls) |
- Universidad Católica
- * Club domestic league appearances and goals as of 29 August 2015

Víctor Mancilla Martínez (1921–2011) was a Chilean footballer. He was the first top scorer for Club Deportivo Universidad Católica in first tier tournaments.

== Honours ==
=== Club ===
- Campeonato Nacional (Chile) Top-Scorer: 1943
