= Leonardo Montenegro =

Chilean footballer (born 1955)

Leonardo Enrique Montenegro Corona (born 16 February 1955 in Santiago, Chile) is a Chilean former professional footballer who played as a midfielder for clubs of Chile and South Africa.

== Clubs ==
- Universidad de Chile 1973–1976
- O'Higgins 1977
- Ñublense 1978
- Universidad de Chile 1979–1980
- Palestino 1981–1984
- Moroka Swallows 1985
- Palestino 1986
- Colo-Colo 1987–1990

== Honours ==
- Universidad de Chile 1979 (Copa Chile)
- Colo-Colo 1988, 1989 and 1990 (Copa Chile), 1989 (Chilean Primera División Championship)
