= 1987 Campeonato Nacional Primera División =

Campeonato Nacional 1987
- Dates: 4 July 1987 – 31 January 1988
- Champions: Universidad Católica (6th title)
- Relegated: San Luis; Rangers; Lota Schwager (Liguilla Promoción)
- 1988 Copa Libertadores: Universidad Católica; Colo-Colo (Liguilla winners)
- Matches: 240
- Goals: 580 (2.42 per match)
- Top goalscorer: Osvaldo Hurtado (21 goals)
- Biggest home win: Univ. de Chile 7–0 Dep. Concepción (2 January 1988)
- Highest attendance: 73,464 Colo-Colo 1–0 Universidad de Chile (26 December)
- Total attendance: 1,424,048
- Average attendance: 5,933

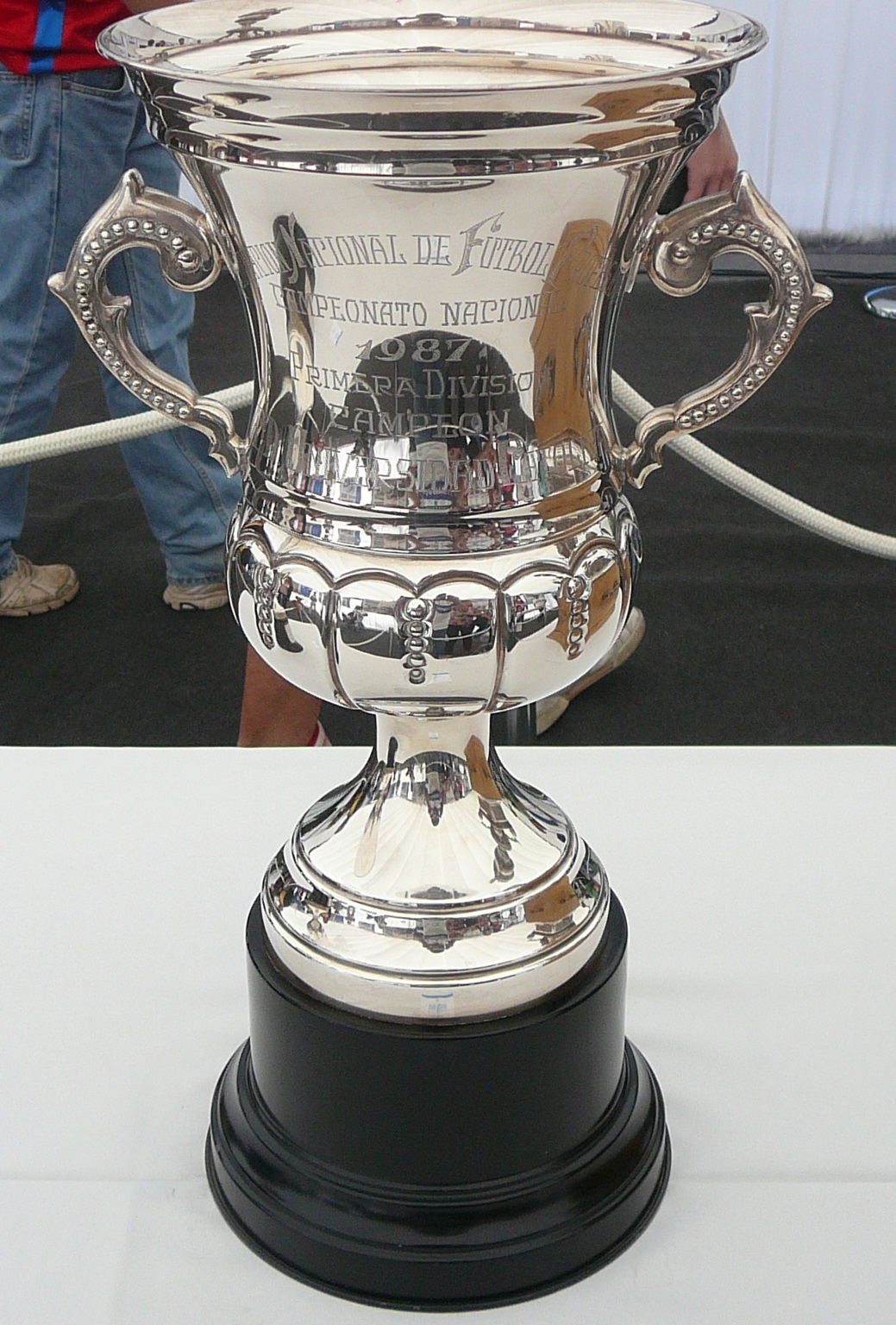
Team's winning trophy in 1987

The 1987 Campeonato Nacional was Chilean football league top tier's 57th season. Universidad Católica was the tournament's champion, winning its sixth title.

== League table ==
Pos	Team	Pld	W	D	L	GF	GA	GD	Pts	Qualification or relegation
1	Universidad Católica	30	21	7	2	51	16	+35	49	Champions; Qualified to 1988 Copa Libertadores
2	Colo-Colo	30	14	11	5	44	28	+16	39	Qualified to Liguilla Pre-Copa Libertadores
3	Cobreloa	30	13	12	5	44	32	+12	38	Qualified to Liguilla Pre-Copa Libertadores
4	Cobresal	30	11	12	7	44	38	+6	34	Qualified to Liguilla Pre-Copa Libertadores
5	Universidad de Chile	30	10	11	9	49	33	+16	31	Qualified to Liguilla Pre-Copa Libertadores
6	Naval	30	10	10	10	39	33	+6	30	
7	Everton	30	9	11	10	33	32	+1	29	
8	Fernández Vial	30	9	11	10	32	32	0	29	
9	Palestino	30	9	11	10	46	57	−11	29	
10	Huachipato	30	10	8	12	30	37	−7	28	
11	Deportes Iquique	30	10	7	13	34	44	−10	27	
12	Unión Española	30	8	10	12	29	34	−5	26	
13	Deportes Concepción	30	7	12	11	31	40	−9	26	
14	Lota Schwager	30	9	8	13	24	33	−9	26	To Promotion/relegation Liguilla
15	Rangers	30	9	7	14	31	47	−16	25	Relegated to Segunda División
16	San Luis	30	3	8	19	19	43	−24	14	Relegated to Segunda División

Campeonato Nacional
1987 champions

6th title

== Results ==
Home \ Away	CLO	CSA	COL	DCO	EVE	FVI	HUA	DIQ	LSC	NAV	PAL	RAN	SLU	UCA	UCH	UES
Cobreloa		1–2	3–1	0–0	3–2	3–1	1–1	1–0	2–0	1–1	3–1	2–0	2–1	0–1	1–1	1–0
Cobresal	2–2		0–0	3–1	1–1	2–0	2–1	2–0	1–2	2–2	6–3	3–2	0–0	1–1	2–1	0–0
Colo-Colo	2–2	3–0		1–0	2–2	1–4	3–0	1–1	1–0	2–1	1–1	1–0	0–0	1–1	1–0	1–2
Concepción	0–0	1–1	0–0		3–2	0–0	1–1	4–1	1–0	1–1	1–0	4–0	3–0	1–2	4–1	0–1
Everton	1–3	2–1	1–2	1–1		0–0	3–0	1–1	1–1	1–1	2–0	2–0	1–0	0–0	0–0	0–0
F. Vial	2–2	2–2	1–3	1–1	2–0		2–3	4–2	0–0	0–2	1–1	1–0	1–0	0–0	1–1	1–0
Huachipato	0–1	1–0	1–0	4–1	1–0	0–1		1–1	2–0	2–0	2–2	1–2	0–0	1–0	2–1	0–0
Iquique	1–0	1–0	1–1	2–1	2–1	3–1	3–0		2–1	1–0	2–1	1–2	1–0	0–1	1–1	0–0
Lota S.	0–1	1–3	2–1	0–0	0–0	0–0	1–0	3–0		4–2	0–1	0–0	1–0	1–3	0–2	1–0
Naval	2–1	1–1	0–0	3–0	3–1	1–0	1–0	2–1	0–1		1–1	5–0	3–2	2–3	0–1	0–0
Palestino	2–2	1–3	1–5	1–1	2–1	2–1	4–2	3–2	1–1	2–1		4–4	3–2	0–2	1–1	0–0
Rangers	1–1	2–2	0–2	2–0	1–2	0–3	3–1	2–1	1–0	0–0	1–2		2–0	1–2	1–0	0–3
San Luis	1–1	2–0	0–2	0–0	1–2	0–1	1–1	1–1	1–2	0–2	1–0	0–1		0–2	0–0	5–0
U. Católica	3–0	0–0	1–1	2–0	0–1	1–0	2–0	2–0	1–0	3–1	4–1	1–1	6–1		2–1	1–0
U. de Chile	3–3	3–0	1–2	7–0	0–1	0–0	1–1	4–0	5–1	1–0	2–2	2–1	2–0	1–2		4–4
U. Española	0–1	1–2	2–3	2–1	1–0	2–1	0–1	3–2	1–1	1–1	2–3	1–1	3–0	0–1	0–2	

Legend: Blue = home team win; Yellow = draw; Red = away team win.

== Topscorer ==
Name	Team	Goals
(Chile) Osvaldo Hurtado	Universidad Católica	21

== Liguilla Pre-Copa Libertadores ==
3 February 1988	Universidad de Chile	1 – 0	Cobresal	Estadio Nacional, Santiago
	Valdir P. 12'			Attendance: 40,476; Referee: G. Castro

3 February 1988	Colo-Colo	3 – 0	Cobreloa	Estadio Nacional, Santiago
	Montenegro 16'; Dabrowski 85'; Jáuregui 87'			Attendance: 40,476; Referee: H. Silva

6 February 1988	Cobreloa	1 – 0	Cobresal	Estadio Nacional, Santiago
	Pino 69'			Attendance: 68,502; Referee: S. Imperatore

6 February 1988	Colo-Colo	0 – 0	Universidad de Chile	Estadio Nacional, Santiago
				Attendance: 68,502; Referee: V. Ojeda

10 February 1988	Universidad de Chile	0 – 1	Cobreloa	Estadio Nacional, Santiago
			21' A. González	Attendance: 45,968; Referee: E. Marín

10 February 1988	Colo-Colo	2 – 0	Cobresal	Estadio Nacional, Santiago
	Jáuregui 34'; Pizarro 64' (pen.)			Attendance: 45,968; Referee: S. Vásquez

Pos	Team	Pld	W	D	L	GF	GA	GD	Pts	Qualification
1	Colo-Colo	3	2	1	0	5	0	+5	5	Qualified to 1988 Copa Libertadores
2	Cobreloa	3	2	0	1	2	3	−1	4	
3	Universidad de Chile	3	1	1	1	1	1	0	3	
4	Cobresal	3	0	0	3	0	4	−4	0	

== Promotion/relegation Liguilla ==
Pos	Team	Pld	W	D	L	GF	GA	GD	Pts	Qualification
1	O'Higgins	2	1	1	0	3	1	+2	3	Promoted to Primera División
2	Lota Schwager	2	1	1	0	2	1	+1	3	To Segunda División
3	Regional Atacama	2	0	0	2	0	3	−3	0	To Segunda División

== See also ==
- 1987 Copa Lan Chile
