= 1975 Campeonato Nacional Segunda División =

Segunda División
- Season: 1975
- Champions: Universidad Católica
- Promoted: Universidad Católica
- Relegated: Deportes Colchagua

The 1975 Segunda División de Chile was the 24th season of the Segunda División de Chile.

Universidad Católica was the tournament's champion.

== Table ==
Pos	Team	Pld	W	D	L	GF	GA	GD	Pts	Promotion or relegation
1	Universidad Católica (C)	30	18	9	3	64	22	+42	45	Champions. Promoted to 1976 Primera División de Chile
2	Deportes Ovalle (P)	30	15	11	4	53	25	+28	41	Promoted to 1976 Primera División de Chile
3	Ñublense	30	17	5	8	53	44	+9	39	
4	San Luis de Quillota	30	12	12	6	42	28	+14	36	
5	Unión San Felipe	30	14	7	9	56	35	+21	35	
6	Ferroviarios	30	13	8	9	59	48	+11	34	
7	Trasandino	30	11	11	8	50	41	+9	33	
8	Audax Italiano	30	11	10	9	52	47	+5	32	
9	San Antonio Unido	30	12	8	10	42	48	−6	32	
10	Iberia Biobío	30	10	8	12	40	44	−4	28	
11	Linares Unido	30	8	8	14	39	55	−16	24	
12	Unión La Calera	30	7	10	13	31	46	−15	24	
13	Curicó Unido	30	5	11	14	42	56	−14	21	
14	Independiente de Cauquenes	30	5	11	14	35	58	−23	21	
15	Malleco Unido	30	5	9	16	31	48	−17	19	
16	Soinca Bata (R)	30	4	8	18	33	77	−44	16	Relegated

Source: rsssf.com
(C) Champions; (P) Promoted; (R) Relegated

== See also ==
- Chilean football league system
