= 1983 Copa Polla Gol =

Tournament details
- Country: Chile

The 1983 Copa Polla Gol was the 13th edition of the Chilean Cup tournament. The competition started on March 6, 1983, and concluded on July 10, 1983. Only first level teams took part in the tournament. Universidad Católica won the competition for their first time, winning the final liguilla. In this edition, and for the first time, the Chilean Cup qualified teams to Copa Libertadores; in this case, the champions Universidad Católica and the runners-up O'Higgins.

== Calendar ==
Round	Date
Group Round	6 March 1983; 29 May 1983
Second Round	5 June 1983; 29 June 1983
Final Liguilla	3–10 July 1983

== Group Round ==
Key to colours in group tables
Teams that progressed to the Second Round

=== North Group ===
	ARI	IQU	ANT	CLO	ATA	SFE	TRA	PAL	MAG	UCA
Arica		4–2	2–1	2–1	4–0	3–1	3–0	4–1	2–2	1–4
Iquique	3–1		2–1	0–0	1–0	7–2	1–1	1–1	1–2	3–3
Antofagasta	2–3	1–1		1–1	2–0	2–0	1–2	4–1	1–2	1–1
Cobreloa	0–0	3–0	1–1		2–0	2–1	1–0	3–1	3–0	2–2
Atacama	2–2	0–2	2–1	1–0		1–0	1–1	1–1	0–0	1–4
San Felipe	1–1	2–0	0–1	1–3	1–1		1–3	2–4	0–0	1–2
Trasandino	4–0	2–2	3–2	0–2	2–3	2–1		0–2	2–3	2–1
Palestino	2–1	3–2	6–1	1–0	5–0	3–0	1–1		0–2	0–4
Magallanes	3–1	0–2	2–0	1–2	1–2	1–0	4–0	1–2		2–1
U. Católica	1–1	2–0	1–0	2–0	2–0	4–3	2–2	1–4	4–2	

Rank	Team	Points
1	Universidad Católica	25
2	Cobreloa	23 (+12)
3	Palestino	23 (+10)
4	Magallanes	21 (+5)*
5	Deportes Arica	21 (+5)
6	Deportes Iquique	18
7	Trasandino	17
8	Regional Atacama	15
9	Deportes Antofagasta	12
10	Unión San Felipe	5

Magallanes qualified for the second round due to its better group head-to-head results (3-1 & 2-2)

=== South Group ===
	EVE	SWA	UES	AUD	UCH	COL	OHI	RAN	NAV	FVI
Everton		1–1	2–1	0–0	2–3	0–2	1–2	1–1	0–0	1–1
S. Wanderers	2–0		1–1	2–0	0–1	2–1	2–0	0–6	3–1	2–3
U. Española	0–3	1–0		1–1	1–1	0–1	2–2	2–3	0–0	5–1
Audax I.	2–4	3–0	2–3		0–3	2–0	2–3	4–2	0–3	0–2
U. de Chile	1–2	3–0	1–1	1–1		0–0	1–2	1–1	2–0	0–0
Colo-Colo	4–2	2–0	3–0	2–1	4–1		4–2	2–5	1–2	3–0
O'Higgins	0–0	2–1	0–0	1–1	3–0	0–2		0–0	2–2	3–1
Rangers	2–2	0–0	3–0	2–1	1–0	2–1	2–2		1–1	2–2
Naval	1–1	0–1	3–3	2–3	4–1	0–0	2–0	0–1		1–0
F. Vial	0–1	1–2	0–0	1–0	1–3	0–2	0–0	1–1	0–0	

Rank	Team	Points
1	Rangers	25
2	Colo-Colo	24
3	O'Higgins	20
4	Naval	18 (+3)
5	Universidad de Chile	18 (0)
6	Everton	18 (0)
7	Santiago Wanderers	17
8	Unión Española	15
9	Fernández Vial	13
10	Audax Italiano	12

== Second round ==
Key to colours in group tables
Teams that progressed to the Final Liguilla

=== Group A ===
	UCA	PAL	COL	MAG
U. Católica		0–1	1–0	5–0
Palestino	1–3		0–0	0–0
Colo-Colo	1–2	1–1		1–0
Magallanes	2–6	2–4	1–5	

Rank	Team	Points
1	Universidad Católica	10
2	Palestino	7
3	Colo-Colo	6
4	Magallanes	1

=== Group B ===
	CLO	OHI	RAN	NAV
Cobreloa		4–0	5–0	1–1
O'Higgins	1–1		3–3	3–0
Rangers	2–2	2–2		2–3
Naval	0–2	2–2	3–4	

Rank	Team	Points
1	Cobreloa	9
2	O'Higgins	6
3	Rangers	5
4	Naval	4

== Final Liguilla ==
=== First matchday ===
3 July 1983

Universidad Católica	1 – 0	O'Higgins
Aravena 28'

Estadio Nacional, Santiago
Attendance: 9,747
Referee: M. Lira
3 July 1983

Palestino	4 – 0	Cobreloa
Benzi 19'; Castañeda 59'; Montenegro 73'; Román 83'

Estadio Nacional, Santiago
Attendance: 9,747
Referee: V. Ojeda

=== Second matchday ===
7 July 1983

Universidad Católica	3 – 1	Cobreloa
Aravena 12', 35', 47'		72' (pen.) Tabilo

Estadio Santa Laura, Santiago
Attendance: 8,571
Referee: S. Vázquez
7 July 1983

Palestino	1 – 2	O'Higgins
Castañeda 39'		18' Geoffroy; 70' Gallardo

Estadio Santa Laura, Santiago
Attendance: 8,571
Referee: J. Silvagno

=== Third matchday ===
10 July 1983

O'Higgins	2 – 1	Cobreloa
Geoffroy 37'; Guajardo 55'		35' Merello

Estadio Nacional, Santiago
Attendance: 12,663
Referee: G. Castro
10 July 1983

Universidad Católica	2 – 1	Palestino
Isasi 56'; Aravena 85'		82' Fuentes

Estadio Nacional, Santiago
Attendance: 12,663
Referee: H. Silva

== Top goalscorer ==
- Jorge Aravena (Universidad Católica) 23 goals

== See also ==
- 1983 Campeonato Nacional
- 1983 Copa República

== Sources ==
- RSSSF
