= Jorge Quinteros =

Argentine footballer

Personal information
- Full name: Jorge Roberto Quinteros
- Date of birth: 27 July 1974 (age 52)
- Place of birth: San Fernando, Argentina
- Height: 1.82 m (6 ft 0 in)
- Position: Striker

Senior career*
| Years | Team | Apps | (Gls) |
| 1993–1997 | Argentinos Juniors | 39 | (6) |
| 1997–1998 | Padova | 6 | (0) |
| 1998–1999 | Argentinos Juniors | 15 | (2) |
| 1999–2000 | Mallorca | 10 | (2) |
| 2000–2001 | San Lorenzo | 24 | (3) |
| 2001–2002 | Chacarita Juniors | 29 | (6) |
| 2002–2003 | Talleres de Córdoba | 24 | (5) |
| 2003–2004 | Argentinos Juniors | 26 | (11) |
| 2004–2006 | Universidad Católica | 67 | (30) |
| 2006 | Argentinos Juniors | 11 | (2) |
| Total | | 251 | (67) |
- * Club domestic league appearances and goals

Jorge Roberto "Polo" Quinteros (born 27 July 1974 in San Fernando, Buenos Aires Province) is an Argentine retired professional footballer who played as a striker.

== Career ==
He has played for Argentinos Juniors in four different spells, his other clubs include RCD Mallorca in Spain, Talleres de Córdoba, San Lorenzo, Club Deportivo Universidad Católica in Chile, and Chacarita Juniors.

The highlights of his career was being part of the San Lorenzo team that won the Clausura 2001 tournament of the Argentine Primera and the Universidad Católica team that won the Clausura 2005 title in Chile.

The low points of his career include relegation from the Primera with Argentinos Juniors in 1996, and being knocked out of the semi-finals of the Chilean Primera by Unión Española, 9–10 on penalties, after scoring to put his team ahead in the game.

== Honours ==
Argentinos Juniors

- Primera B Nacional: 1996–97

San Lorenzo

- Primera División Argentina: 2001 Apertura

Universidad Católica

- Primera División de Chile: 2005 Clausura
