= Jorge Aravena (footballer) =

Chilean footballer (born 1958)

Personal information
- Full name: Jorge Orlando Aravena Plaza
- Date of birth: 22 April 1958 (age 68)
- Place of birth: Santiago, Chile
- Height: 1.77 m (5 ft 10 in)
- Positions: Attacking midfielder; striker

Youth career
- 1973–1977: Universidad Católica

Senior career*
Years	Team	Apps	(Gls)
1978–1985	Universidad Católica	76	(28)
1980	→ Santiago Morning (loan)	20	(5)
1981–1982	→ Naval (loan)	27	(13)
1985–1986	Real Valladolid	25	(10)
1986–1988	Deportivo Cali	77	(35)
1988–1991	Puebla	112	(66)
1991	Portuguesa	24	(8)
1992	Unión Española	32	(10)
1993	Audax Italiano	20	(7)
Total		413	(182)

International career
1983–1989	Chile	36	(22)

Managerial career
- 1995: Audax Italiano
- 1996–1997: Palestino
- 1998–1999: Santiago Morning
- 2000: Everton
- 2001–2002: Santiago Morning
- 2005: Chile U16
- 2005: Puebla
- 2006: Cobreloa
- 2006–2007: Palestino
- 2007–2008: Lobos BUAP
- 2008–2009: Santiago Wanderers
- 2009–2010: Palestino
- 2017: Comerciantes Unidos
- 2017–2019: Deportes Valdivia
- 2020–2021: Deportes Puerto Montt
- 2022: Deportes Temuco
- * Club domestic league appearances and goals

Jorge Orlando "Mortero" Aravena Plaza (born 22 April 1958) is a Chilean former footballer. A left-footed attacking midfielder or deep-lying forward, he played for several clubs in Latin America and Europe, including Club Deportivo Universidad Católica, Deportivo Cali and Puebla F.C. Today, Aravena is considered a major figure in the history of these clubs. In addition, Aravena has managed several clubs in Chile and Latin America.

Aravena also represented the Chile national football team. He earned 36 caps in the 1980s, scoring 22 goals.

Throughout his career Jorge Aravena scored 285 goals, making him the fifth top scorer in the history of Chilean football and the highest scorer among midfielders.

== Personal life ==
Avarena was the nephew of Orlando Aravena, who was also a Chilean international footballer.

== Career statistics ==
=== International ===
Appearances and goals by national team and year
National team	Year	Apps	Goals
Chile	1983	13	8
Chile	1984	2	1
Chile	1985	16	10
Chile	1986	0	0
Chile	1987	0	0
Chile	1988	0	0
Chile	1989	5	3
Chile	1990	1	0
Total		37	22

Scores and results list Chile's goal tally first, score column indicates score after each Aravena goal.

List of international goals scored by Jorge Aravena
No.	Date	Venue	Opponent	Score	Result	Competition	Ref.
1	14 July 1983	Estadio El Campín, Bogotá, Colombia	Colombia	1–2	2–2	Friendly	
2	19 July 1983	Estadio Hernando Siles, La Paz, Bolivia	Bolivia	1–0	2–1	Friendly	
3	17 August 1983	Estadio Regional de Antofagasta, Antofagasta, Chile	Paraguay	1–1	3–2	Friendly	
4	24 August 1983	Estadio Carlos Dittborn, Arica, Chile	Bolivia	2–0	4–2	Friendly	
5	24 August 1983	Estadio Carlos Dittborn, Arica, Chile	Bolivia	3–0	4–2	Friendly	
6	24 August 1983	Estadio Carlos Dittborn, Arica, Chile	Bolivia	4–1	4–2	Friendly	
7	8 September 1983	Estadio Nacional, Santiago, Chile	Venezuela	3–0	5–0	1983 Copa América	
8	8 September 1983	Estadio Nacional, Santiago, Chile	Venezuela	5–0	5–0	1983 Copa América	
9	28 October 1984	Estadio Nacional, Santiago, Chile	Mexico	1–0	1–0	Friendly	
10	6 February 1985	Estadio Sausalito, Viña del Mar, Chile	Paraguay	1–0	1–0	Friendly	
11	8 February 1985	Estadio Sausalito, Viña del Mar, Chile	Finland	2–0	2–0	Friendly	
12	9 March 1985	National Stadium of Peru, Lima, Peru	Peru	1–1	1–1	Friendly	
13	17 March 1985	Estadio Nacional, Santiago, Chile	Ecuador	5–2	6–2	1986 FIFA World Cup qualification	
14	17 March 1985	Estadio Nacional, Santiago, Chile	Ecuador	6–2	6–2	1986 FIFA World Cup qualification	
15	24 March 1985	Estadio Nacional, Santiago, Chile	Uruguay	2–0	2–0	1986 FIFA World Cup qualification	
16	7 April 1985	Estadio Centenario, Montevideo, Uruguay	Uruguay	1–1	1–2	1986 FIFA World Cup qualification	
17	27 October 1985	Estadio Nacional, Santiago, Chile	Peru	1–0	4–2	1986 FIFA World Cup qualification	
18	27 October 1985	Estadio Nacional, Santiago, Chile	Peru	3–1	4–2	1986 FIFA World Cup qualification	
19	3 November 1985	National Stadium of Peru, Lima, Peru	Peru	1–0	1–0	1986 FIFA World Cup qualification	
20	25 July 1989	Estadio Carlos Dittborn, Arica, Chile	Peru	2–0	2–1	Friendly	
21	6 August 1989	Brígido Iriarte Stadium, Caracas, Venezuela	Venezuela	1–0	3–1	1990 FIFA World Cup qualification	
22	6 August 1989	Brígido Iriarte Stadium, Caracas, Venezuela	Venezuela	2–0	3–1	1990 FIFA World Cup qualification	

== Honours ==
- 1986 FIFA World Cup Qualification Top scorer
