= 1984 Campeonato Nacional Primera División =

1984 Chilean football league

Campeonato Nacional 1984
- Dates: 21 July 1984 – 22 December 1984
- Champions: Universidad Católica (5th title)
- Relegated: Santiago Wanderers; Deportes Antofagasta; Deportes La Serena; Regional Atacama; Trasandino; Fernández Vial; Green Cross Temuco; Coquimbo Unido
- Matches: 345
- Goals: 845 (2.45 per match)
- Top goalscorer: Víctor Cabrera (18 goals)
- Biggest home win: Colo-Colo 8–1 San Luis (9 December)
- Highest attendance: 69,597 Colo-Colo 1–0 Universidad de Chile (16 September)
- Total attendance: 1,733,641
- Average attendance: 5,040

The 1984 Campeonato Nacional was Chilean football league top tier’s 52nd season. Universidad Católica was the tournament’s champion, winning its fifth title. The champion was decided by a small final tournament (Liguilla).

== North Zone ==
=== Standings ===
Pos	Team	Pld	W	D	L	GF	GA	GD	Pts	Qualification or relegation
1	Cobreloa	26	18	5	3	47	14	+33	41	Qualified to Championship Liguilla
2	Cobresal	26	16	6	4	44	20	+24	38	Qualified to Championship Liguilla
3	Colo-Colo	26	14	8	4	52	21	+31	36	
4	Deportes Arica	26	11	8	7	36	33	+3	30	
5	Magallanes	26	10	9	7	43	30	+13	29	
6	Deportes Iquique	26	7	12	7	23	28	−5	26	
7	Palestino	26	10	5	11	44	37	+7	25	
8	Unión San Felipe	26	7	10	9	23	29	−6	24	
9	San Luis	26	9	6	11	28	49	−21	24	
10	Santiago Wanderers	26	6	10	10	21	29	−8	22	Relegated to Segunda División
11	Deportes Antofagasta	26	6	5	15	24	47	−23	17	Relegated to Segunda División
12	Deportes La Serena	26	2	9	15	26	48	−22	13	Relegated to Segunda División
13	Regional Atacama	26	3	7	16	26	55	−29	13	Relegated to Segunda División

=== Scores ===
Home \ Away	ANT	ARI	ATA	CLO	CSA	COL	IQU	LSE	MAG	PAL	SFE	SLU	SWA
Antofagasta		2–1	2–2	0–3	1–3	1–2	0–3	2–1	1–0	1–1	1–0	2–3	3–0
Arica	2–1		1–0	1–1	3–1	0–0	1–1	2–0	1–1	2–0	1–0	0–2	0–0
Atacama	1–1	0–0		0–1	0–1	0–2	1–0	5–3	2–4	3–1	0–0	2–3	0–0
Cobreloa	1–0	2–0	3–2		3–0	0–0	6–0	1–0	2–0	3–2	1–0	4–0	1–1
Cobresal	2–0	2–1	7–1	0–1		2–0	2–0	4–1	0–0	3–2	1–0	4–0	2–0
Colo-Colo	6–1	1–3	3–0	1–3	1–1		4–1	2–1	1–1	3–1	2–0	8–1	4–0
Iquique	2–0	0–0	1–0	0–0	0–1	0–0		1–1	0–0	3–2	2–0	0–0	1–0
La Serena	0–1	5–6	1–1	1–1	2–3	1–1	2–2		3–1	1–0	0–0	1–2	0–0
Magallanes	4–2	5–1	1–0	1–2	1–1	0–2	1–0	1–0		2–2	2–2	6–0	3–1
Palestino	2–0	2–3	7–2	2–0	0–1	2–2	2–0	3–0	3–1		2–1	1–1	2–0
San Felipe	1–0	1–0	3–2	1–0	1–1	0–3	3–3	1–1	0–0	1–0		2–1	1–0
San Luis	0–0	0–3	4–2	0–2	0–0	0–3	0–0	3–0	2–5	1–2	0–0		1–0
S. Wanderers	2–2	1–1	5–0	2–0	1–0	1–1	1–1	2–0	0–0	1–2	1–0	2–1	

Legend: Blue = home team win; Yellow = draw; Red = away team win.

=== Interzone ===
FVI	0–1	CSA	1–1
ANT	0–1	NAV	4–0
SLU	2–0	EVE	0–1
SWA	1–1	UES	3–0
IQU	1–0	RAN	1–1
ARI	3–2	OHI	3–0
CLO	4–0	COQ	0–2

LSE	0–0	GCT	3–1
UCA	1–0	PAL	1–1
COL	1–0	UCH	2–0
MAG	3–1	HUA	1–0
ATA	0–0	TRA	1–0
SFE	1–1	AUD	4–4

== South Zone ==
=== Standings ===
Pos	Team	Pld	W	D	L	GF	GA	GD	Pts	Qualification or relegation
1	Universidad Católica	26	15	7	4	46	18	+28	37	Qualified to Championship Liguilla
2	Unión Española	26	13	9	4	34	16	+18	35	Qualified to Championship Liguilla
3	Naval	26	12	7	7	32	18	+14	31	
4	O'Higgins	26	11	7	8	32	30	+2	29	
5	Universidad de Chile	26	10	8	8	29	23	+6	28	
6	Rangers	26	8	9	9	34	35	−1	25	
7	Huachipato	26	10	5	11	34	36	−2	25	
8	Everton	26	8	9	9	22	28	−6	25	
9	Trasandino	26	9	6	11	38	37	+1	24	Qualified to Relegation Play-off
10	Audax Italiano	26	8	8	10	37	40	−3	24	Qualified to Relegation Play-off
11	Fernández Vial	26	8	6	12	25	36	−11	22	Relegated to Segunda División
12	Green Cross Temuco	26	6	7	13	18	37	−19	19	Relegated to Segunda División
13	Coquimbo Unido	26	4	6	16	17	41	−24	14	Relegated to Segunda División

=== Scores ===
Home \ Away	AUD	COQ	EVE	FVI	GCT	HUA	NAV	OHI	RAN	TRA	UCA	UCH	UES
Audax		3–0	0–0	2–1	2–0	2–0	1–3	1–2	4–2	3–1	1–6	2–2	0–1
Coquimbo	2–2		3–1	0–0	1–0	1–0	1–1	1–3	2–1	1–2	0–1	0–2	0–1
Everton	2–2	1–0		2–0	1–1	0–0	0–0	0–0	3–1	2–1	1–0	0–0	1–2
F. Vial	2–3	2–2	0–2		1–0	2–0	1–0	2–1	1–0	2–1	1–1	1–0	2–2
Green Cross T.	0–2	2–0	2–1	0–0		1–3	0–3	1–1	0–1	1–1	1–1	2–0	0–0
Huachipato	2–0	1–0	3–0	1–2	1–0		2–1	3–1	1–1	2–1	1–2	1–3	1–2
Naval	2–0	1–0	0–0	1–0	0–1	1–2		2–0	4–1	1–1	0–0	0–0	1–0
O'Higgins	1–0	0–0	2–1	1–0	3–1	2–1	2–0		1–2	0–0	1–1	3–2	1–1
Rangers	0–0	2–2	0–2	4–3	3–1	1–1	2–3	2–0		1–1	3–2	0–0	0–0
Trasandino	2–2	4–1	6–0	2–1	0–1	5–2	3–2	2–0	0–3		0–3	0–1	1–3
U. Católica	2–0	1–0	0–1	4–1	6–0	1–0	0–0	3–0	1–0	3–1		3–2	0–0
U. de Chile	1–0	2–0	1–0	1–1	3–0	1–1	0–1	1–1	0–2	0–2	3–1		1–0
U. Española	1–0	2–0	1–1	4–0	2–0	3–3	1–0	0–1	1–1	2–0	0–2	1–1	

Legend: Blue = home team win; Yellow = draw; Red = away team win.

== Relegation play-off ==
Audax I.	3–0	Trasandino

Pos	Team	Pld	W	D	L	GF	GA	GD	Pts	Relegation
1	Audax Italiano	1	1	0	0	3	0	+3	2	
2	Trasandino	1	0	0	1	0	3	−3	0	Relegated to 1985 Segunda División

== Championship Liguilla ==
Pos	Team	Pld	W	D	L	GF	GA	GD	Pts	Qualification	UCA	CSA	UES	CLO
1	Universidad Católica (C)	3	2	1	0	4	0	+4	5	Qualified to 1985 Liguilla Pre-Copa Libertadores		0–0	2–0	2–0
2	Cobresal	3	0	3	0	1	1	0	3	Qualified to 1985 Pre-Copa Libertadores Play-off			0–0	1–1
3	Unión Española	3	1	1	1	1	2	−1	3					1–0
4	Cobreloa	3	0	1	2	1	4	−3	1					

(C) Champions

Campeonato Nacional
1984 champions
Universidad Católica
5th title

== Topscorer ==
Name	Team	Goals
(Chile) Víctor Cabrera	Regional Atacama	18

== See also ==
- 1984 Copa Polla Gol
