= Copa Chile =

- Founded: 1958
- Region: Chile
- Teams: 48
- Domestic cup: Supercopa de Chile
- Current champions: Huachipato (1st title)
- Most championships: Colo-Colo (14 titles)
- Website: ANFP Copa Chile
- 2026 Copa Chile

The Copa Chile (Chile Cup) is an annual cup competition for Chilean football teams. Due to time constraints and club pressure, the trophy was cancelled in 2000, but returned in 2008. Its precursor was the Campeonato de Apertura (Opening Championship), played from 1933 to 1950.

The cup is now open to every member club of the Chilean football league system, from professional teams; (Primera División, Primera B & Segunda División), down to teams from the ANFA: Tercera División. Since the season 2009, the winners obtained a direct Copa Sudamericana spot for the next season, however this was change starting from the 2015 edition; since then the winners obtains a direct Copa Libertadores spot for the next season.

In the history of the tournament, the Primera División teams have dominated the competition; but, because this is contested in a knockout tournament format, the opportunity for lower-level teams upsetting a top level squad is a real possibility. That was the case in the seasons 1960, 1962, 2009 & 2010, when the winners were clubs from the second level: Deportes La Serena, Luis Cruz, Unión San Felipe and Municipal Iquique. A major upset almost occurred in the 2008 competition, when Deportes Ovalle (from the third-level league) became finalist, losing 1–2 to Universidad de Concepción at the final, in a very close match.

In some seasons the tournament only included first level teams, that was the case the seasons: 1979 to 1984, 1986, 1987, 1989-Invierno, 1990, 1998 and 2000.

Only two clubs have become double champions (league and cup winners the same season); Colo-Colo in 1981, 1989, 1990 & 1996, and Universidad de Chile in 2000.

== Trophy ==
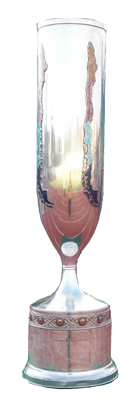
Copa Chile trophy.

At the end of the final, the winning team is presented with a trophy, also known as the Copa Chile, which they hold until the following year's final.

The cup stands 120 centimetres tall and is made of 8 kg of pure solid silver, its design includes the map of the Chilean territory (being four times around the trophy), made with stones of different colors, carved agate, Onyx and lapis lazuli.

The trophy was forged in 1974, in the Hernán Baeza Rebolledo workshop, located in the commune of San Miguel. Its manufacture took nearly a month.

As well as winning the right to keep the trophy until the start of the next season, the winner gets to have a badge small silver plate at the pedestal of the trophy. The badge has the winners' name and the year of success.

== Finals ==
Ed.	Year	Champion	Scores	Runner-up	Trophy
1	1958	Colo-Colo (1)	2–2	Universidad Católica	Copa Chile
2	1959	Santiago Wanderers (1)	5–1	Deportes La Serena	Copa Chile
3	1960	Deportes La Serena (1)	4–1	Santiago Wanderers	Copa Preparación
4	1961	Santiago Wanderers (2)	1–2, 2–0	Universidad Católica	Copa Chile Green Cross
5	1962	Luis Cruz (1)	2–1	Universidad Católica	Copa Preparación
–	1963–1973	Not held			
6	1974	Colo-Colo (2)	3–0	Santiago Wanderers	Copa Chile
7	1975	Palestino (1)	4–0	Lota Schwager	Copa Chile
–	1976	Not held			
8	1977	Palestino (2)	4–3	Unión Española	Copa Chile
–	1978	Not held			
9	1979	Universidad de Chile (1)	2–1	Colo-Colo	Copa Polla Gol
10	1980	Deportes Iquique (1)	2–1	Colo-Colo	Copa Polla Gol
11	1981	Colo-Colo (3)	5–1	Audax Italiano	Copa Polla Gol
12	1982	Colo-Colo (4)		Universidad Católica	Copa Polla Gol
13	1983	Universidad Católica (1)		O'Higgins	Copa Polla Gol
14	1984	Everton (1)	3–0	Universidad Católica	Copa Polla Gol
15	1985	Colo-Colo (5)	1–0	Palestino	Copa Polla Gol
16	1986	Cobreloa (1)	1–0, 0–2, 3–0	Fernández Vial	Copa Polla Lan Chile
17	1987	Cobresal (1)	2–0	Colo-Colo	Copa Lan Chile
18	1988	Colo-Colo (6)	1–0	Unión Española	Copa Digeder
19	1989	Colo-Colo (7)	1–0	Universidad Católica	Copa Coca-Cola Digeder
20	1990	Colo-Colo (8)	3–2	Universidad Católica	Copa Apertura
21	1991	Universidad Católica (2)	1–0	Cobreloa	Copa Chile Digeder
22	1992	Unión Española (1)	3–1	Colo-Colo	Copa Chile
23	1993	Unión Española (2)	3–1	Cobreloa	Copa Chile
24	1994	Colo-Colo (9)	1–1 4–2 (pen.)	O'Higgins	Copa Chile
25	1995	Universidad Católica (3)	4–2	Cobreloa	Copa Chile
26	1996	Colo-Colo (10)	1–1, 1–0	Rangers	Copa Chile Eduardo Simián
–	1997	Not held			
27	1998	Universidad de Chile (2)	1–1, 2–0	Audax Italiano	Copa Apertura
–	1999	Not held			
28	2000	Universidad de Chile (3)	2–1	Santiago Morning	Copa Apertura
–	2001–2007	Not held			
29	2008–09	Universidad de Concepción (1)	2–1	Deportes Ovalle	Copa Chile
30	2009	Unión San Felipe (1)	3–0	Deportes Iquique	Copa Chile
31	2010	Deportes Iquique (2)	1–1 4–3 (pen.)	Deportes Concepción	Copa Chile Bicentenario
32	2011	Universidad Católica (4)	0–1, 1–0 4–2 (pen.)	Magallanes	Copa Chile
33	2012–13	Universidad de Chile (4)	2–1	Universidad Católica	Copa Chile MTS
34	2013–14	Deportes Iquique (3)	3–1	Huachipato	Copa Chile MTS
35	2014–15	Universidad de Concepción (2)	3–2	Palestino	Copa Chile MTS
36	2015	Universidad de Chile (5)	1–1 5–3 (pen.)	Colo-Colo	Copa Chile MTS
37	2016	Colo-Colo (11)	4–0	Everton	Copa Chile MTS
38	2017	Santiago Wanderers (3)	3–1	Universidad de Chile	Copa Chile MTS
39	2018	Palestino (3)	1–0, 3–2	Audax Italiano	Copa Chile MTS
40	2019	Colo-Colo (12)	2–1	Universidad de Chile	Copa Chile MTS
–	2020	Cancelled due to the COVID-19 pandemic			
41	2021	Colo-Colo (13)	2–0	Everton	Copa Chile Easy
42	2022	Magallanes (1)	2–2 7–6 (pen.)	Unión Española	Copa Chile Easy
43	2023	Colo-Colo (14)	3–1	Magallanes	Copa Chile Easy
44	2024	Universidad de Chile (6)	1–0	Ñublense	Copa Chile Coca-Cola Sin Azúcar
45	2025	Huachipato (1)	1–1 4–3 (pen.)	Deportes Limache	Copa Chile Coca-Cola Sin Azúcar

=== Notes ===
- ^1958Colo Colo on better goal average over entire tournament.
- ^1982Colo Colo win a small final tournament.
- ^1983Universidad Católica win a small final tournament.

== Titles by club ==
Club	Titles	Runners-up	Seasons won	Seasons runner-up
Colo-Colo	14	5	1958, 1974, 1981, 1982, 1985, 1988, 1989, 1990, 1994, 1996, 2016, 2019, 2021, 2023	1979, 1980, 1987, 1992, 2015
Universidad de Chile	6	2	1979, 1998, 2000, 2012–13, 2015, 2024	2017, 2019
Universidad Católica	4	8	1983, 1991, 1995, 2011	1958, 1961, 1962, 1982, 1984, 1989, 1990, 2013
Palestino	3	2	1975, 1977, 2018	1985, 2015
Santiago Wanderers	3	2	1959, 1961, 2017	1960, 1974
Deportes Iquique	3	1	1980, 2010, 2013–14	2009
Unión Española	2	3	1992, 1993	1977, 1988, 2022
Universidad de Concepción	2	—	2008-09, 2014–15	—
Cobreloa	1	3	1986	1991, 1993, 1995
Everton	1	2	1984	2016, 2021
Magallanes	1	2	2022	2011, 2023
Deportes La Serena	1	1	1960	1959
Huachipato	1	1	2025	2014
Luis Cruz	1	—	1962	—
Cobresal	1	—	1987	—
Unión San Felipe	1	—	2009	—
Audax Italiano	—	3	—	1981, 1998, 2018
O'Higgins	—	2	—	1981, 1998
Lota Schwager	—	1	—	1975
Fernández Vial	—	1	—	1986
Rangers	—	1	—	1996
Santiago Morning	—	1	—	2000
Deportes Ovalle	—	1	—	2008
Deportes Concepción	—	1	—	2010
Ñublense	—	1	—	2024
Deportes Limache	—	1	—	2025

== Titles by region ==
The following table lists the Chilean Cup champions by region.

Region	Nº of titles	Clubs
Metropolitan	30	Colo-Colo (14), Universidad de Chile (6), Universidad Católica (4), Palestino (3), Unión Española (2), Magallanes (1)
Valparaíso	5	Santiago Wanderers (3), Everton (1), Unión San Felipe (1)
Tarapacá	3	Deportes Iquique (3)
Biobío	3	Universidad de Concepción (2), Huachipato (1)
Coquimbo	1	Deportes La Serena (1)
Maule	1	Luis Cruz (1)
Antofagasta	1	Cobreloa (1)
Atacama	1	Cobresal (1)

== Other official cup tournaments ==
=== Copa de la República ===
Year	Champion	Scores	Runner-up
1983	Universidad Católica	1–0	Naval

=== Copa Invierno ===
Year	Champion	Scores	Runner-up
1989	Unión Española	2–0	Huachipato

== Sources ==
- Chile Cup - RSSSF
