= 1983 Copa República =

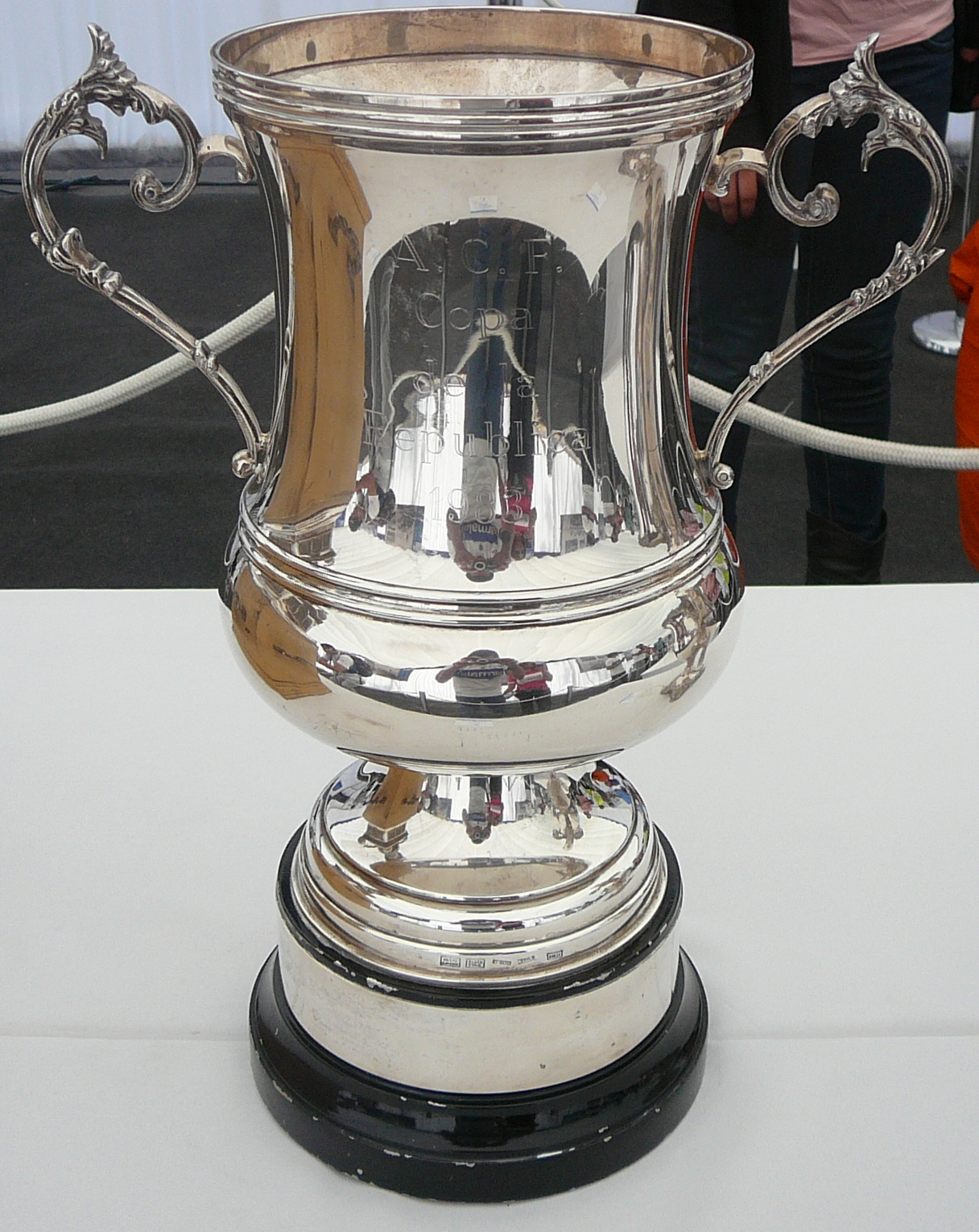
Republic Cup won by Universidad Católica corresponding to the 1983 season and played in 1984.

The Copa República 1983 was an official Chilean Cup tournament. The competition started on January 11, 1984, and concluded on March 7, 1984. Universidad Católica won the competition for their second time, beating Naval 1–0 in the final. Played in early 1984, the tournament was the second official cup competition of the 1983 season.

== Calendar ==
Round	Date
First round	11–18 January 1984
Second round	25 January 1984; 1 February 1984
Third round	8–14 February 1984
Semi-finals	21 February 1984; 3 March 1984
Final	7 March 1984

== First round ==
Team 1	Agg.	Team 2	1st leg	2nd leg
Everton	5–5 (a)	Santiago Wanderers	3–4	2–1
Naval	2–1	Huachipato	1–0	1–1
Trasandino	1–5	Unión San Felipe	0–1	1–4
Green Cross Temuco	2–3	Fernández Vial	1–0	1–3
Colo-Colo	2–3	Audax Italiano	0–1	2–2
Deportes Iquique	3–3 (a)	Deportes Arica	1–1	2–2
Universidad de Chile	1–1 (5-4p)	Unión Española*	1–0	0–1
Deportes Antofagasta	4–4 (a)	Cobreloa	3–0	1–4
Universidad Católica	2–2 (a)	Palestino	0–1	2–1
Regional Atacama	4–3	Magallanes	2–0	2–3
O'Higgins	0–7	Rangers	0–4	0–3

* Qualified as "Best Loser"

== Second round ==
Team 1	Agg.	Team 2	1st leg	2nd leg
Santiago Wanderers	5–4	Unión San Felipe	2–0	3–4
Universidad Católica	2–2 (a)	Universidad de Chile	0–1	2–1
Unión Española	0–2	Audax Italiano	0–0	0–2
Fernández Vial	2–5	Naval	1–3	1–2
Deportes Iquique	1–1 (a)	Deportes Antofagasta	0–0	1–1
Rangers	2–2 (a)	Regional Atacama	1–2	1–0

== Third round ==
Team 1	Agg.	Team 2	1st leg	2nd leg
Santiago Wanderers	2–1	Audax Italiano	1–0	1-1
Naval*	4–4 (a)	Universidad Católica	3–2	1–2
Deportes Iquique	6–1	Regional Atacama	4–0	2–1

* Qualified as "Best Loser"

== Semifinals ==
February 21, 1984

Santiago Wanderers	0 – 0	Universidad Católica

Municipal de Valparaíso, Valparaíso
Attendance: 10,964
Referee: M. Lira

February 21, 1984

Naval	1 – 0	Deportes Iquique
T. Díaz 84'

Estadio El Morro, Talcahuano
Attendance: 3,289
Referee: H. Silva

March 3, 1984

Universidad Católica	3 – 0	Santiago Wanderers
Olmos 39'; Neira 65'; Hurtado 90'

Estadio Santa Laura, Santiago
Attendance: 9,468
Referee: S. Vasquez

March 3, 1984

Deportes Iquique	1 – 1	Naval
Dávila 19' (pen.)		Venegas 7'

Estadio Municipal de Iquique, Iquique
Attendance: 5,430
Referee: C. Robles

== Final ==
March 7, 1984

Universidad Católica	1 – 0	Naval
Isasi 49'

Estadio Santa Laura, Santiago
Attendance: 11,365
Referee: J. Silvagno

== Top goalscorers ==
- Juvenal Olmos (U. Católica) 3 goals
- Dagoberto Donoso (Naval) 3 goals
- Ricardo Flores (Naval) 3 goals
- Fidel Dávila (D. Iquique) 3 goals
- Víctor Cabrera (R. Atacama) 3 goals
- Julio Rodríguez (D. Antofagasta) 3 goals
- Pablo Prieto (Rangers) 3 goals
- Juan C. Letelier (Cobreloa) 3 goals
- Luis Araneda (Everton) 3 goals

== See also ==
- 1983 Campeonato Nacional
- 1983 Copa Polla Gol

== Sources ==
- Revista Deporte Total (Santiago, Chile) January–March 1984 (revised scores & information)
- Diario La Tercera de la Hora (Santiago, Chile) April 8, 1984 (final match)
- RSSSF (secondary source, too many mistakes)
