= C.D. Regional Atacama =

Chilean football club

Regional Atacama
- Full name: Club de Deportes Regional Atacama
- Nicknames: Leones; Albirrojos
- Founded: 1979
- Dissolved: 1998
- Ground: Estadio Luis Valenzuela Hermosilla; Copiapó
- Capacity: 12,000
- League: Segunda División
- 1998: 16th
Home colours	Away colours

Regional Atacama was a Chilean football club based in the city of Copiapó, Atacama Region. The club was founded in 1979, playing a total of six season at the top level of Chilean football during its 18-year existence.

In 1998, the club was folded due to financial difficulties.

Deportes Copiapó took their place as the Copiapó city local team in 1999.

== Achievements ==
- 6 seasons in Primera División
- 12 seasons in Segunda División

== Notable players ==
- (Chile) Víctor Cabrera
- (Chile) Wilson Contreras
- (Chile) Franklin Lobos
- (Chile) Marcelo Vega
- (Argentina) Roberto Corro

== See also ==
- Deportes Copiapó
