= Naval de Talcahuano =

Chilean football club

- Full name: Deportes Naval de Talcahuano
- Nickname(s): Navalinos, Choreros
- Founded: 21 May 1944
- Dissolved: 15 February 1991
- Ground: El Morro Ramón Unzaga Asla; Talcahuano
- Capacity: 7,142
- League: Tercera División B de Chile 2025
- 1990: 13th
Home colours	Away colours

Naval de Talcahuano, were a Chilean football club based in the city of Talcahuano, Biobío Region. The club founded in 1944 as Asociación Naval de Foot-Ball, was property of the Armada de Chile and played only at amateur level for 24 years, until 1968 when it began to play at professional level in the second tier of Chilean football.

Since then, the club played 6 seasons at the Second level, and 17 at the highest level of Chilean football, the Primera División. Their best performance were the seasons 1981 and 1982, when they finished 5th; and the season 1983 when they reached the final of the Chilean Cup, losing to Univ. Catolica 1–0.

In 1991 the club was dissolved by the then Chilean Navy Commander, General Jorge Martínez Bush, due to financial difficulties.

== National honors ==
- Segunda División: 1

1971

- Copa Apertura Segunda División (Cup): 1

1969
