= José María Lourido =

Argentine football player and manager

Personal information
- Full name: José María Lourido Conjil
- Date of birth: 1922
- Place of birth: Villa Urquiza, Buenos Aires, Argentina
- Date of death: June 1986
- Place of death: Chile
- Position: Left winger

Youth career
- Atlético El Tronador

Senior career*
| Years | Team | Apps | (Gls) |
- Atlético El Tronador
| 1942–1944 | Banfield | 12 | (2) |
| 1945–1946 | La Salle | | |
| 1947 | Defensores de Belgrano | 33 | (10) |
| 1948–1950 | Independiente Rivadavia | | |
| 1950–1954 | Everton | 89 | (28) |
| 1955 | Unión La Calera | | |

Managerial career
- 1965: Unión La Calera
- 1966: Unión La Calera
- 1966: Everton
- 1968–1969: Everton
- 1970: Everton
- 1970–1971: Unión La Calera
- 1972: Everton
- 1974: Unión La Calera
- 1976: Unión La Calera
- 1977: Santiago Wanderers (assistant)
- 1977: Santiago Wanderers (caretaker)
- 1981: Everton
- * Club domestic league appearances and goals

José María Lourido Conjil (1922 – June 1986) was an Argentine football inside forward and manager.

== Playing career ==
Born in Villa Urquiza, Buenos Aires, Argentina, Lourido started his career with Atlético El Tronador before joining Banfield in 1942. He moved to Venezuelan club La Salle and returned to his homeland with Defensores de Belgrano in 1947.

As a player of Independiente Rivadavia, Lourido represented the Mendoza team in friendlies in Viña del Mar, Chile, and signed with local club Everton in August 1950, becoming an important player in their two first Chilean Primera División titles in 1950 and 1952. The club became the first Chilean champions from outside Santiago.

Lourido ended his career with Unión La Calera in the 1955 Chilean Segunda División.

== Coaching career ==
Settled in Chile, Lourido led clubs from the Valparaíso Region. He coached many times Everton de Viña del Mar and Unión La Calera. As José Pérez Figueiras' assistant coach, he also led the Everton's classic rival, Santiago Wanderers, as a caretaker in 1977.

As manager of Unión La Calera in 1966, Lourido made possible the senior debut of the renowned Chilean player, Osvaldo Castro.

== Personal life ==
Lourido was nicknamed Gitano (Gypsy).
