= Fernando Hurtado (footballer, born 1927) =

Chilean footballer

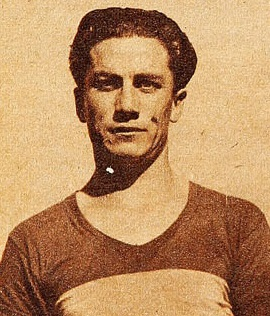

Personal information
- Full name: Fernando Hurtado Álvarez
- Date of birth: 27 October 1927
- Date of death: 23 April 1993 (aged 65)

Senior career*
Years	Team	Apps	(Gls)
- Everton

International career
1953	Chile	2	(0)
- * Club domestic league appearances and goals

Fernando Hurtado Álvarez (27 October 1927 – 23 April 1993) was a Chilean footballer. He played in three matches for the Chile national football team in 1953 Two of them were A-class matches. He was also part of Chile's squad for the 1953 South American Championship.

== Honours ==
Everton

- Chilean Primera División (2): 1950, 1952
