= Fernando Hurtado =

Fernando Hurtado may refer to:

- Fernando Pérez de Lara (born c. 1115, fl. 1122–50), also called Fernando Furtado or Hurtado, Castilian nobleman
- Fernando Hurtado Echenique (1902–1980), Chilean agronomist and politician
- Fernando Hurtado (footballer, born 1927), Chilean footballer
- Fernando Hurtado Pascual (born 1944), Peruvian agronomist, headed the Ministry of Agriculture (Peru) in 2020
- Fernando Hurtado (footballer, born 1983), Chilean footballer
