= Martín García Díaz =

Argentine football player and manager

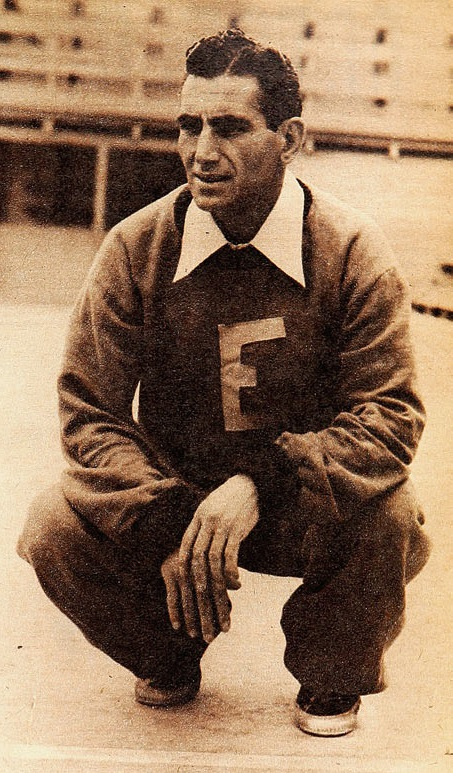

Personal information
- Full name: Martín García Díaz
- Date of birth: 25 January 1915
- Place of birth: La Paz, Córdoba, Argentina
- Date of death: 29 February 1992 (aged 77)
- Position: Midfielder

Youth career
- Atlético Calzada

Senior career*
Years	Team	Apps	(Gls)
- Atlético Calzada
- Atlantic Sportsmen
1930–1937	Provincial Rosario		
1938	Gimnasia La Plata		
1939	Platense		
1940–1945	Santiago Wanderers		
1946–1948	Everton		

Managerial career
- 1948–1954: Everton
- 1955–1958: Unión Española
- 1959: Ñublense
- 1961: Selección Schwager
- 1962–1963: Audax Italiano
- 1963: Magallanes
- 1964–1965: Santiago Wanderers
- 1967–1968: Green Cross-Temuco
- 1970: Gimnasia de Mendoza
- 1975: Everton (youth)
- 1975: Everton
- * Club domestic league appearances and goals

Martín García Díaz (25 January 1915 – 29 February 1992) was an Argentine football half and manager.

== Playing career ==
A half, García Díaz played for Atlético Calzada, Atlantic Sportsmen and Provincial de Rosario before playing for Gimnasia La Plata and Platense in the Argentine Primera División in 1938 and 1939, respectively.

Emigrant to Chile, García Díaz played for Santiago Wanderers (1940–1945) and Everton de Viña del Mar (1946–1948). With Santiago Wanderers, he won the Asociación Porteña de Fútbol Profesional in 1942 and the 1943 Apertura.

== Coaching career ==
Following his retirement, García Díaz started his career with Everton de Viña del Mar, winning their first two Chilean Primera División titles in 1950 and 1952.

In the Chilean Primera División, García Díaz also led Unión Española, Audax Italiano, Magallanes, Santiago Wanderers and Green Cross-Temuco. In the Chilean second division, he led Ñublense in 1959.

In Argentina, García Díaz led Gimnasia y Esgrima de Mendoza in 1970.
