= Héctor Robles =

Chilean footballer and coach (born 1971)

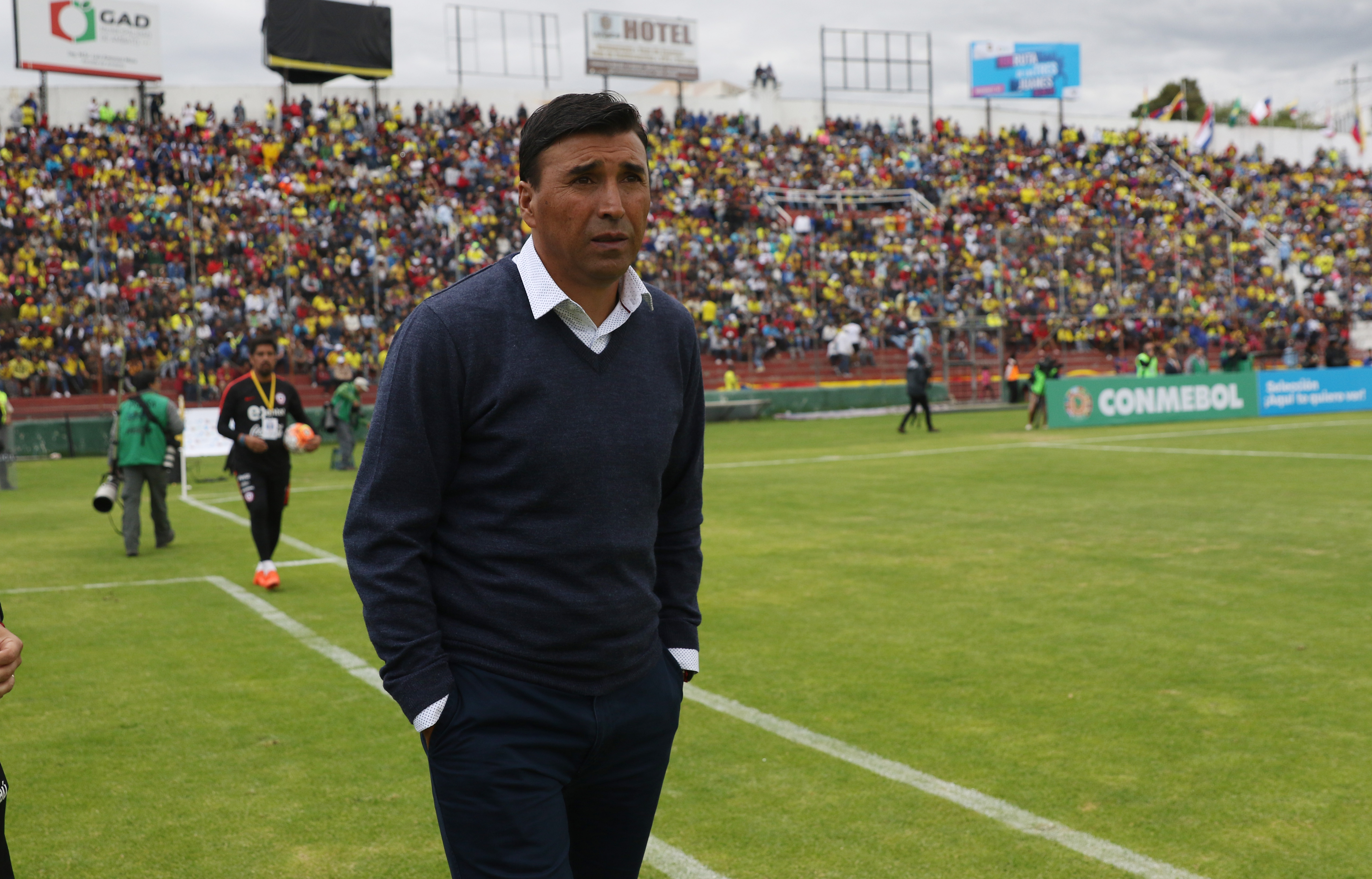

Personal information
- Full name: Héctor Rosendo Robles Fuentes
- Date of birth: 7 September 1971 (age 55)
- Place of birth: Santiago, Chile
- Height: 1.82 m (5 ft 11 1/2 in)
- Position: Defender

Youth career
- Palestino

Senior career*
Years	Team	Apps	(Gls)
1993–1998	Palestino	122	(5)
1999–2004	Santiago Wanderers	165	(12)
2005–2007	Coquimbo Unido	70	(5)
Total		357	(22)

International career
1991	Chile U20	4	(2)
2001	Chile	3	(0)
2001	Chile B	1	(0)

Managerial career
- 2007: Santiago Wanderers (assistant)
- 2007–2008: Santiago Wanderers (caretaker)
- 2008–2011: Santiago Wanderers (youth)
- 2011: Universidad de Chile (youth)
- 2011: Santiago Wanderers
- 2012: Santiago Wanderers (caretaker)
- 2014: Santiago Wanderers (caretaker)
- 2015: Universidad de Chile (youth)
- 2016–2019: Chile U20
- 2020: San Luis (assistant)
- 2021–2022: Santiago Wanderers (assistant)
- 2023–2024: Santiago Wanderers (youth)
- 2024: Santiago Wanderers (interim)
- 2025: Santiago Wanderers
- * Club domestic league appearances and goals

Héctor Rosendo Robles Fuentes (born 7 September 1971) is a Chilean coach and former footballer.

== International career ==
In 1991, Robles represented Chile at under-20 level under Manuel Pellegrini in the South American Championship.

Robles made 3 appearances for the Chile national team in 2001. In addition, he made an appearance for Chile B in the friendly match against Catalonia on 28 December 2001.

== Coaching career ==
He has mainly developed his career with Santiago Wanderers as coach as well as Sport Director. In addition he have had steps with Universidad de Chile at youth level and Chile U20.

After working as Head of the technical staff of Deportes Antofagasta youth system, Robles assumed as the assistant coach of Jorge Garcés in Santiago Wanderers at the end of 2021. Later, he worked as coach of the Santiago Wanderers youth ranks until September 2024, when he was fired for a misunderstanding during an internship with Inter Miami. Once it was clarified, he assumed as the interim coach of the first team on 7 October 2024.

== Personal life ==
He is the father of the professional footballer Andrés Robles.

== Honours ==
=== Player ===
Santiago Wanderers

- Primera División de Chile (1): 2001

=== Manager ===
Chile U20

- South American Games Gold medal: 2018
