= 1962 Copa Preparación =

Tournament details
- Country: Chile

Final positions
- Champions: Luis Cruz Martínez
- Runners-up: Universidad Católica

The 1962 Copa Preparación was the fifth edition of the Chilean Cup tournament. The competition started on April 15, 1962, and concluded on May 20, 1962. Luis Cruz Martínez won the competition for the first time, beating Universidad Católica 2–1 in the final.

Matches were scheduled to be played at the stadium of the team named first on the date specified for each round. If scores were level after 90 minutes had been played, an extra time took place. If scores were still level after the 30 minutes extra time, a penalty shootout took place, where every team designated one kicker, who takes 3 penalty kicks. If at the end of these three rounds of kicks the teams have scored an equal number of goals, a coin toss took place.

== Calendar ==
Round	Date
First round	15 April 1962
Second round	21–25 April 1962
Third round	28 April 1962
Semi-finals	12–13 May 1962
Final	20 May 1962

== First round ==
Home team	Score	Away team
Lister Rossel	1–3	Luis Cruz Martínez
San Antonio Unido	3–2	Colo-Colo
Ñublense	2–1	Rangers
Unión San Felipe	0–2	Santiago Morning
Valparaíso Ferroviario	1–3	Unión Española
Universidad Técnica	2–1	Universidad de Chile
Green Cross	2–1	San Bernardo Central
Magallanes	0–1	O'Higgins
Iberia	1–3	Santiago Wanderers
Trasandino	2–1	Audax Italiano
Unión La Calera	3–2	Ferrobádminton
Deportivo Municipal*	2–3	Palestino
Everton	4–2	San Luis
Coquimbo Unido	3–0	Deportes La Serena
Deportes Colchagua	1–6	Universidad Católica

* Qualified as "Best Loser"

== Second round ==
Home team	Score	Away team
Luis Cruz Martínez	0–0 (3–2p)	Ñublense
Unión La Calera	1–1 (2–2p) (ct)	Santiago Wanderers
Green Cross	0–3	Unión Española
Trasandino	1–2	Everton
San Antonio Unido	1–1 (2–3p)	Universidad Católica
Universidad Técnica	2–3	Santiago Morning
Coquimbo Unido	2–3	Palestino
O'Higgins	1–0	Deportivo Municipal

== Third round ==
Home team	Score	Away team
Luis Cruz Martínez	2–0	Unión Española
Universidad Católica	4–2	Santiago Morning
Santiago Wanderers	2–2 (3–3p) (ct)	Everton
O'Higgins	2–1	Palestino

== Semifinals ==
May 12, 1962

Universidad Católica	4 – 3 (a.e.t.)	O'Higgins
Ibáñez 29'; Ramírez 62'; Nackwacki 89'; Pesce 107'		35', 69' Cabrera; 38' Herrera

Estadio Independencia, Santiago
Attendance: 7,000
Referee: A. Reginatto

May 13, 1962

Luis Cruz Martínez	1 – 0	Santiago Wanderers
Guajardo 53'

Estadio La Granja, Curicó
Attendance: 3,106
Referee: J. Cruzat

== Final ==
May 20, 1962

Universidad Católica	1 – 2	Luis Cruz Martínez
Ibáñez 56' (pen.)		29' Verdugo; 58' Riquelme

Estadio Independencia, Santiago
Attendance: 7,104
Referee: S. Bustamante

== Top goalscorer ==
- Hernán Zamora (U. Católica) 5 goals

== See also ==
- 1962 Campeonato Nacional
- Primera B
