= René Meléndez (footballer, born 1928) =

Chilean footballer

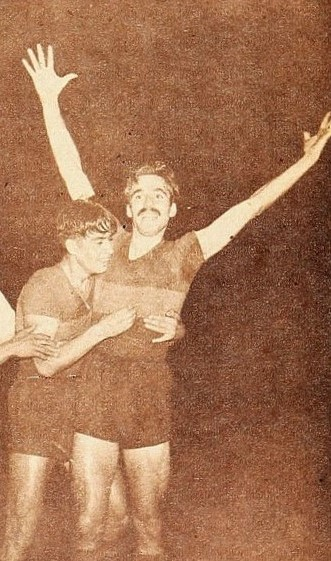

Personal information
- Full name: René Orlando Meléndez Brito
- Date of birth: 29 December 1928
- Place of birth: María Elena, Chile
- Date of death: 14 November 2002 (aged 73)
- Place of death: Vina del Mar, Chile
- Height: 1.73 m (5 ft 8 in)
- Position: Forward

Senior career*
Years	Team	Apps	(Gls)
1948–1956	Everton	208	(119)
1957–1958	Universidad de Chile		
1959–1960	O'Higgins		
1961–1962	Unión La Calera		
1963	Deportes Colchagua		
1964	Luis Cruz Martínez		
- * Club domestic league appearances and goals

René Orlando Meléndez Brito (born 29 December 1928 – 14 November 2002) was a Chilean footballer.

He is well known in the Chilean football for be a key player in Everton de Viña del Mar’s two first league title obtention as well as who obtained the 1952 league top-scorer award after netting 30 goals.

== Honours ==
Everton

- Primera División de Chile (2): 1950, 1952

Unión La Calera

- Segunda División de Chile: 1961

== Legacy ==
Constituted on 10 February 1960, Meléndez was a leadership member of the Unión de Jugadores Profesionales (Union of Professional Football Players) in Chile.
