= Ovidio Casartelli =

Paraguayan football player and manager

Personal information
- Full name: Ovidio Benito Casartelli López
- Date of birth: 3 April 1925
- Place of birth: Asunción, Paraguay
- Date of death: 8 December 2008 (aged 83)
- Place of death: Santiago, Chile
- Position: Midfielder

Senior career*
| Years | Team | Apps | (Gls) |
- Guaraní
- Boca Juniors
| 1953 | Deportivo Pereira | | |
| 1954 | Atlético Nacional | 4 | (0) |
| 1955–1956 | O'Higgins | | |

International career
- Paraguay

Managerial career
- Ferrobádminton
- Colchagua
- Lister Rossel
- 1961: O'Higgins
- 1962–1963: Luis Cruz Martínez
- 1963–1965: Universidad Técnica
- 1967: Everton
- 1972: O'Higgins
- 1973: Curicó Unido
- 1974: Unión Magdalena
- 1987: Sport Colombia
- * Club domestic league appearances and goals

Ovidio Benito Casartelli López (3 April 1925 – 8 December 2008) was a Paraguayan footballer and manager.

== Playing career ==
Born in Asunción, Paraguay, Casartelli stood out with Guaraní, winning the 1949 Paraguayan Primera División. Abroad, he also played for Argentine club Boca Juniors and the Colombian clubs Deportivo Pereira and Atlético Nacional. He won the 1954 Colombian first division with Atlético Nacional, the first league title in the club history.

He ended his career in Chile with O'Higgins in 1955–56, taking part in the first season at the Chilean Primera División for the club.

At international level, Casartelli represented the Paraguay national team.

== Coaching career ==
Settled in Chile, Casartelli started his career at young age of thirty-something, leading clubs such as Ferrobádminton, Colchagua, Lister Rossel, O'Higgins, among others. He is better known by winning the 1962 Copa Preparación, as it was known the Copa Chile, with Luis Cruz Martínez, defeating Universidad Católica.

Later, Casartelli led another clubs such as Universidad Técnica del Estado, Everton de Viña del Mar, O'Higgins again and Curicó Unido in Chile. In Colombia, he coached Unión Magdalena in 1974.

As manager, Casartelli was known for his strong personality. He used to provide benzedrine to his players to improve their performances under the pretext of it was glucose.
