= 1959 Torneo Hexagonal de Lima =

Tournament details
- Dates: 14 January – 6 February 1959
- Teams: 6

Final positions
- Champions: (Brazil) Flamengo (1st title)
- Runners-up: (Uruguay) Peñarol

Tournament statistics
- Matches played: 15
- Goals scored: 54 (3.6 per match)
- Top scorer(s): (Brazil) Henrique (4 goals) (Peru) D. Ruiz (4 goals) (Uruguay) Luis Cubilla (4 goals)

The Torneo Hexagonal de Lima, also called Gran Serie Suramericana Inter Clubes by two 2019 sources, was an exhibition football competition hosted in Lima, Peru in 1959. All matches were played at the Estadio Nacional in Lima. Flamengo were the champions.

Though two 2019 sources referred to it as "Gran Serie Suramericana Inter Clubes", heretofore no original 1959 mass media source has ever been found referring to the competition as "gran serie sudamericana" or any similar term. Furthermore, among the six renowned participating clubs, only one club was the reigning champions of its respective home league, therefore the competition did not have the format of a "champions cup/league", the format used for cups crowning continental champions, and Jornal dos Sports, then the most relevant sport newspaper of Rio de Janeiro, hometown of winners Flamengo, referred in 1959 to the competition only as an international friendly tournament, without referring to it as "Gran Serie Sudamericana" or any similar term. The same two 2019 sources affirm that the competition was an inspiration for the Copa Libertadores, which is proved incorrect by the fact that the creation of the latter was announced at a UEFA meeting on October 8th 1958, as published by Brazilian and Spanish newspapers the following day, thus before the 1959 Lima tournament.

== Qualified teams ==
| Country | Team | Qualification method |
|---|---|---|
| Argentina; 1 berth | River Plate | 1958 Primera División 5th place |
| Brazil; 1 berth | Flamengo | 1958 Campeonato Carioca runner-up |
| Chile; 1 berth | Colo-Colo | 1958 Primera División runner-up |
| Peru; 2 berths | Universitario | 1958 Primera División 4th place |
| Peru; 2 berths | Alianza Lima | 1958 Primera División 7th place |
| Uruguay; 1 berth | Peñarol | 1958 Primera División champion |

== League table ==
=== Standings ===
| Pos | Team | Pld | W | D | L | GF | GA | GD | Pts | (Brazil) FLA | (Uruguay) PEÑ | (Peru) UNI | (Argentina) RIV | (Peru) ALI | (Chile) COL |
|---|---|---|---|---|---|---|---|---|---|---|---|---|---|---|---|
| 1 | (Brazil) Flamengo | 5 | 4 | 0 | 1 | 14 | 8 | +6 | 8 | | | 2–0 | 4–1 | 4–3 | 4–2 |
| 2 | (Uruguay) Peñarol | 5 | 2 | 2 | 1 | 11 | 5 | +6 | 6 | 2–0 | | | | | 5–0 |
| 3 | (Peru) Universitario | 5 | 2 | 1 | 2 | 7 | 8 | −1 | 5 | | 2–2 | | 2–1 | | 3–1 |
| 4 | (Argentina) River Plate | 5 | 2 | 1 | 2 | 7 | 8 | −1 | 5 | | 2–1 | | | | 2–0 |
| 5 | (Peru) Alianza Lima | 5 | 1 | 2 | 2 | 9 | 9 | 0 | 4 | | 1–1 | 2–0 | 1–1 | | |
| 6 | (Chile) Colo-Colo | 5 | 1 | 0 | 4 | 6 | 16 | −10 | 2 | | | | | 3–2 | |

Legend: Blue = home team win; Yellow = draw; Red = away team win.

== Match results ==
14 January 1959

| Universitario (Peru) | 3–1 | (Chile) Colo-Colo |
|---|---|---|
| D. Ruiz 22' 28'; M. Márquez 29' | | M. Musso 81' |

Estadio Nacional, Lima
Attendance: ~18,400
Referee: (Peru) Alberto Tejada Burga

17 January 1959

| Colo-Colo (Chile) | 3–2 | (Peru) Alianza Lima |
|---|---|---|
| F. Molina 75' 87'; B. Bello 81' | | J. Bassa 38'; O. Gómez Sánchez 42' |

Estadio Nacional, Lima
Attendance: ~21,700
Referee: A. Alva

17 January 1959

| River Plate (Argentina) | 2–1 | (Uruguay) Peñarol |
|---|---|---|
| N. Menéndez 7'; R. Zárate 48' | | Luis Cubilla 88' |

Estadio Nacional, Lima
Attendance: ~21,700
Referee: (Austria) Fritz Mayer

21 January 1959

| Universitario (Peru) | 2–1 | (Argentina) River Plate |
|---|---|---|
| D. Ruiz 49'; B. Galeano 84' | | I. Rosello 26' |

Estadio Nacional, Lima
Attendance: ~45,800
Referee: (Austria) Erwin Hieger

23 January 1959

| Alianza Lima (Peru) | 1–1 | (Argentina) River Plate |
|---|---|---|
| J. Bassa 18' | | N. Menéndez 34' |

Estadio Nacional, Lima
Attendance: ~40,900

23 January 1959

| Peñarol (Uruguay) | 2–0 | (Brazil) Flamengo |
|---|---|---|
| Ruben Coccinello 62'; Carlos Borges 89' |

Estadio Nacional, Lima
Attendance: ~40,900

25 January 1959

| Peñarol (Uruguay) | 5–0 | (Chile) Colo-Colo |
|---|---|---|
| Luis Cubilla 5' 39'; Juan Eduardo Hohberg 32'; J. García 58'; Ruben Coccinello 79' |

Estadio Nacional, Lima
Attendance: ~37,400

25 January 1959

| Flamengo (Brazil) | 2–0 | (Peru) Universitario |
|---|---|---|
| Henrique 25'; Moacir 30' |

Estadio Nacional, Lima
Attendance: ~37,400

28 January 1959

| Flamengo (Brazil) | 4–2 | (Chile) Colo-Colo |
|---|---|---|
| Luis Carlos 5'; Moacir 10'; Babá 16' 22' | | F. Hormazábal 48'; H. Rodríguez 67' |

Estadio Nacional, Lima
Attendance: ~43,800

28 January 1959

| Alianza Lima (Peru) | 2–0 | (Peru) Universitario |
|---|---|---|
| M. Mosquera 7'; G. Barbadillo 19' |

Estadio Nacional, Lima
Attendance: ~43,800
Referee: (Austria) Erwin Hieger

31 January 1959

| River Plate (Argentina) | 2–0 | (Chile) Colo-Colo |
|---|---|---|
| R. Zárate 3'; H. De Bourgoing 71' |

Estadio Nacional, Lima
Attendance: ~38,900

31 January 1959

| Alianza Lima (Peru) | 1–1 | (Uruguay) Peñarol |
|---|---|---|
| Juan Joya 57' | | Juan Eduardo Hohberg 15' |

Estadio Nacional, Lima
Attendance: ~38,900

3 February 1959

| Flamengo (Brazil) | 4–1 | (Argentina) River Plate |
|---|---|---|
| Luis Carlos 41'; Henrique 43' 71'; Dida 62' | | N. Menéndez 61' |

Estadio Nacional, Lima
Attendance: ~41,500
Referee: (Austria) Erwin Hieger

6 February 1959

| Universitario (Peru) | 2–2 | (Uruguay) Peñarol |
|---|---|---|
| D. Ruiz 17'; T. Iwasaki 71' | | Luis Cubilla 24'; Carlos Borges 90' |

Estadio Nacional, Lima
Attendance: ~44,200
Referee: (Austria) Erwin Hieger

6 February 1959

| Flamengo (Brazil) | 4–3 | (Peru) Alianza Lima |
|---|---|---|
| Manoelzinho 56' 58' 60'; Henrique 62' | | V. Zegarra 7' 54'; F. Castillo 42' |

Estadio Nacional, Lima
Attendance: ~44,200
Referee: (Austria) Fritz Mayer
