= 1962 Campeonato Nacional Primera División =

Campeonato Nacional de Fútbol Profesional
- Dates: 7 July 1962 – 16 March 1963
- Champions: Universidad de Chile (3rd title)
- Relegated: Green Cross
- Copa de Campeones: Universidad de Chile
- Matches: 307
- Goals: 1,060 (3.45 per match)
- Top goalscorer: Carlos Campos (34 goals)
- Biggest away win: Magallanes 1–9 Universidad de Chile (1 December)
- Highest attendance: 85,268 Universidad de Chile 4–1 Universidad Católica (29 December)
- Total attendance: 2,655,763
- Average attendance: 8,651

The 1962 Campeonato Nacional de Fútbol Profesional, was the 30th season of top-flight football in Chile. Universidad de Chile won their third title following a 5–3 win against Universidad Católica in the championship play-off on 16 March 1963, also qualifying to the 1963 Copa de Campeones.

== Final table ==
Pos	Team	Pld	W	D	L	GF	GA	GD	Pts	Qualification or relegation
1	Universidad de Chile	34	21	8	5	100	48	+52	50	Qualified for the Championship play-off
2	Universidad Católica	34	22	6	6	78	47	+31	50	Qualified for the Championship play-off
3	Colo-Colo	34	17	7	10	94	67	+27	41	
4	Deportes La Serena	34	17	7	10	67	58	+9	41	
5	Unión Española	34	15	8	11	63	50	+13	38	
6	Santiago Morning	34	13	11	10	53	51	+2	37	
7	Santiago Wanderers	34	12	11	11	50	51	−1	35	
8	Everton	34	10	15	9	53	55	−2	35	
9	Unión San Felipe	34	10	11	13	54	54	0	31	
10	Audax Italiano	34	8	14	12	54	61	−7	30	
11	O'Higgins	34	8	14	12	54	66	−12	30	
12	Unión La Calera	34	12	5	17	52	63	−11	29	
13	Ferrobádminton	34	8	13	13	45	61	−16	29	
14	Magallanes	34	9	11	14	41	62	−21	29	
15	Rangers	34	10	8	16	42	53	−11	28	
16	Palestino	34	7	14	13	45	60	−15	28	
17	San Luis	34	8	10	16	49	66	−17	26	
18	Green Cross	34	9	7	18	58	79	−21	25	Relegated to Segunda División

== Results ==
Home \ Away	AUD	COL	EVE	FEB	GCR	DLS	MAG	OHI	PAL	RAN	USF	SLU	SMO	ULC	UES	UCA	UCH	SWA
Audax		5–3	2–2	2–2	2–2	3–4	3–1	1–1	1–1	0–1	2–2	2–1	1–1	2–1	2–1	2–2	2–4	1–2
Colo-Colo	4–3		1–1	3–0	6–2	3–3	3–2	1–1	3–1	3–0	1–1	4–1	1–2	4–3	3–2	3–2	1–1	6–2
Everton	0–0	0–1		2–1	2–0	1–0	4–0	1–1	2–2	1–1	3–3	0–0	2–0	2–1	2–1	3–0	1–8	1–1
Ferrobádminton	0–0	4–4	1–1		2–1	1–1	2–4	2–0	0–3	2–1	1–0	3–0	2–2	5–0	0–0	0–2	1–3	2–0
Green Cross	2–5	2–1	5–5	3–2		3–0	3–0	3–0	3–2	0–0	1–5	2–1	1–4	3–5	0–1	1–4	1–2	1–1
La Serena	4–1	3–2	2–2	5–1	3–1		1–1	1–0	0–1	2–1	2–1	5–2	1–0	1–0	1–0	1–2	4–2	4–2
Magallanes	0–2	2–1	2–1	0–0	1–1	2–2		2–2	2–1	2–1	1–1	1–1	2–0	1–0	0–1	2–4	1–9	0–0
O'Higgins	2–1	2–6	2–2	2–2	0–3	1–3	1–1		2–2	3–0	3–2	2–0	3–3	4–2	5–3	3–3	5–4	2–2
Palestino	1–1	0–6	2–0	2–2	2–2	0–0	2–5	4–0		0–0	1–3	2–0	0–2	2–1	0–0	3–1	3–3	0–0
Rangers	3–1	1–3	1–0	0–1	1–3	2–5	2–1	1–0	1–1		2–2	2–3	4–0	0–1	1–3	5–5	1–0	1–0
San Felipe	3–2	2–3	1–1	1–1	3–1	4–4	0–1	0–0	1–0	2–1		2–1	2–2	2–0	2–1	1–2	0–2	0–1
San Luis	2–2	5–3	2–3	3–1	0–0	3–1	1–1	2–0	3–1	1–1	0–3		1–2	2–1	1–1	3–2	1–1	2–2
S. Morning	0–1	2–2	3–1	0–0	2–1	1–0	5–1	0–0	2–2	2–4	2–1	4–2		0–0	3–2	1–4	1–1	2–1
La Calera	1–1	1–0	1–2	6–2	3–1	3–2	2–1	2–1	1–1	0–1	1–1	1–0	1–0		4–2	3–1	1–3	2–2
U. Española	3–1	2–1	4–1	3–0	3–1	4–0	1–1	3–1	4–2	2–1	3–1	2–1	2–2	2–1		2–2	1–3	1–1
U. Católica	2–0	2–1	3–2	4–0	3–0	4–0	2–0	2–1	3–0	1–0	3–1	2–1	2–0	2–1	0–0		2–0	2–1
U. de Chile	0–0	6–3	1–1	0–0	3–2	4–1	2–0	2–2	4–0	3–1	2–0	6–2	3–2	6–0	5–3	4–1		2–1
S. Wanderers	3–0	1–4	2–1	3–2	5–3	0–1	1–0	0–2	2–1	0–0	3–1	1–1	0–1	4–2	1–0	2–2	3–1	

Legend: Blue = home team win; Yellow = draw; Red = away team win.

== Championship play-off ==
16 March 1963

Universidad de Chile	5 – 3	Universidad Católica
Campos 12', 29'; Álvarez 52', 68'; Sánchez 87'		41' Tobar; 49', 80' Fouilloux

Estadio Nacional, Santiago
Attendance: 74,163
Referee: D. Massaro

== Title ==
Campeonato Profesional
1962 champion
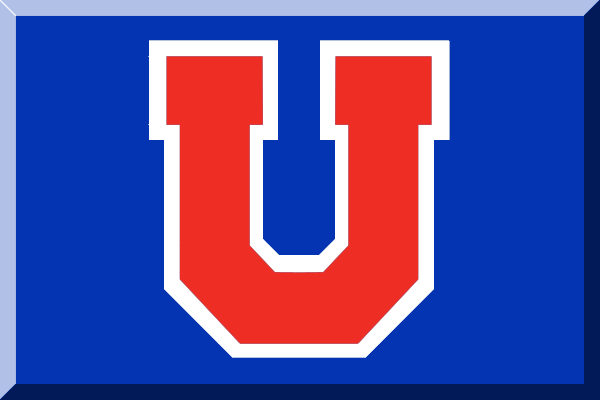
Universidad de Chile
3rd title

== Topscorer ==
Name	Team	Goals
(Chile) Carlos Campos	Universidad de Chile	34

== See also ==
- 1962 Copa Preparación
