= Félix Díaz =

Félix Díaz may refer to:

- Félix Díaz (politician) (Félix Díaz Prieto; 1868–1945), Mexican politician and general, nephew of President Porfirio Díaz
- Félix Díaz Mori (1833–1872), Mexican soldier and politician, brother of President Porfirio Díaz
- Félix Díaz Ortega (1931–2006), Venezuelan soldier and far-right politician
- Félix Díaz (baseball) (born 1980), Major League Baseball player
- Félix Díaz (cacique) (born 1959), qarashé of the Potae Napocna Navogoh aboriginal community, Argentina
- Félix Díaz (footballer) (born 1927), former footballer
- Manuel Félix Díaz (born 1983), Dominican Olympic boxer
