= Andrés Robles =

Chilean footballer (born 1994)

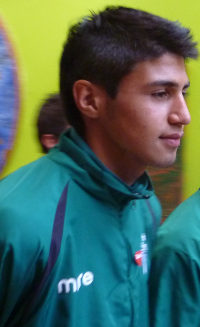
- Robles with Chile U20 in 2013

Personal information
- Full name: Andrés Sebastián Robles Fuentes
- Date of birth: 7 May 1994 (age 32)
- Place of birth: Santiago, Chile
- Height: 1.82 m (6 ft 0 in)
- Position: Centre-back

Youth career
- 2002–2008: Santiago Wanderers

Senior career*
Years	Team	Apps	(Gls)
2009–2017	Santiago Wanderers	90	(1)
2014–2015	→ Atlético Madrid B (loan)	11	(0)
2016–2017	→ Huachipato (loan)	26	(1)
2018	San Luis	16	(0)
2019	Real Garcilaso	19	(0)
2019–2020	Água Santa	9	(0)
2020	Universidad de Concepción	21	(2)
2021–2024	Deportes Antofagasta	63	(2)
2024	→ Água Santa (loan)	7	(0)
2024–2025	Água Santa	12	(0)
2024	→ Náutico (loan)	0	(0)
2025	Botafogo-PB	5	(0)
2025–2026	Caxias	5	(0)
2026	XV de Piracicaba	2	(0)

International career
2010–2011	Chile U17	9	(0)
2013	Chile U20	13	(0)
2013	Chile	1	(0)
- * Club domestic league appearances and goals as of 29 August 2026

Andrés Sebastián Robles Fuentes (born 7 May 1994) is a Chilean footballer who plays as a centre-back. He last played for Brazilian club XV de Piracicaba.

== Club career ==
Despite Chile, Robles has played in Spain with Atlético Madrid B, Peru with Real Garcilaso and Brazil with Água Santa.

In February 2024, Robles returned to Brazil and rejoined Água Santa on loan from Deportes Antofagasta. From the second half of the same year, he permanently signed with Água Santa and ended his contract in June 2025.

On 4 June 2025, Robles joined Botafogo-PB in the Brazilian Série C. At the end of the same year, he switched to Caxias.

On 13 March 2026, Robles joined XV de Piracicaba.

== International career ==
After playing the 2010 South American Games and the 2011 South American U-17 Championship at Ecuador as captain (where Chile didn’t reach the 2011 FIFA U-17 World Cup qualification), two years later he integrated the U20 squad at the 2013 FIFA U-20 World Cup which they qualified to it after a brilliant South American Youth Championship in Argentina — where he had to overcome a serious knee injury to play it — with Mario Salas as coach.

On 20 April 2013, after being called-up by Jorge Sampaoli to play a friendly match with Brazil days ago, Robles made his full international debut against O Pentacampeão coming on as a substitute in the 90th minute during a 2–2 draw at Belo Horizonte which re-inaugurated the Estádio Mineirão.

== Personal life ==
He is the son of the former Chilean international Héctor Robles.
