= José Pérez (Argentine footballer) =

Argentine football player and manager

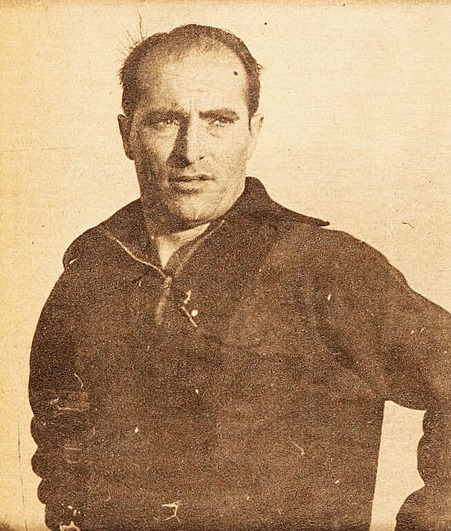
- Pérez in 1947.

Personal information
- Full name: José Pérez Figueiras
- Date of birth: 24 June 1912
- Place of birth: Villa Soldati, Buenos Aires, Argentina
- Date of death: 8 May 1986 (aged 73)
- Place of death: Rancagua, Chile
- Position: Left winger

Senior career*
Years	Team	Apps	(Gls)
1927–1936	Platense		
1937	San Lorenzo		
1938–1939	RC Paris		
1940	San Lorenzo		
1941–1946	Ferro Carril Oeste	92	(9)
1947	Bádminton		

Managerial career
- 1945: Ferro Carril Oeste (youth)
- 1945–1946: Ferro Carril Oeste (player-manager)
- 1947–1948: Bádminton (player-manager)
- 1949–1950: Santiago Wanderers
- 1951: Platense
- 1952: Sporting Tabaco
- 1953: San Lorenzo
- 1955–1961: Santiago Wanderers
- 1963–1967: O'Higgins
- 1968: Santiago Wanderers
- 1969–1973: Universidad Católica
- 1973: Everton
- 1974: O'Higgins (advisor)
- 1975–1976: Santiago Wanderers
- 1977: Santiago Wanderers (youth)
- 1977: Santiago Wanderers
- 1979: Santiago Wanderers (youth)
- 1981: Santiago Wanderers
- * Club domestic league appearances and goals

José "Gallego" Pérez Figueiras (24 June 1912 – 8 May 1986) was an Argentine football inside forward and manager.

== Playing career ==
An inside forward, Pérez made his senior debut with Platense, aged 15. In his homeland, he also played for San Lorenzo de Almagro (1937, 1940) and Ferro Carril Oeste (1941–1946).

Abroad, Pérez was with French club Racing Club de Paris for about two years until the beginning of World War II and ended his career with Chilean club Bádminton in 1947.

== Coaching career ==
Pérez started his career as a player-manager with Ferro Carril Oeste and Chilean club Bádminton. In his homeland, he also led Platense and San Lorenzo de Almagro.

Pérez mainly developed his career in Chile. He stood out with Santiago Wanderers, winning their two first Chilean Primera División titles in 1958 and 1968 in addition to the Copa Chile in 1959 and 1961.

In Chile, Pérez also led O'Higgins, winning the 1964 Segunda División, Universidad Católica and Everton de Viña del Mar.

== Personal life ==
Pérez was born in Villa Soldati neighbourhood, Buenos Aires, to a Spanish parents. He was nicknamed Gallego (Galician).

He died on 8 May 1986 in Rancagua, Chile.
