= Fabiano Avello =

Chilean footballer

Personal information
- Date of birth: 17 April 2006 (age 20)
- Place of birth: Nacimiento, Chile
- Position: Goalkeeper

Team information
- Current team: Santiago Wanderers
- Number: 35

Youth career
- 2022–2024: Huachipato
- 2025–2026: Santiago Wanderers

Senior career*
Years	Team	Apps	(Gls)
2026–	Santiago Wanderers	1	(0)
- * Club domestic league appearances and goals as of 20 September 2026

Fabiano Avello (born 17 April 2006) is a Chilean football goalkeeper who currently plays for Santiago Wanderers.

== Club career ==
Born in Nacimiento, he began his career in amateur football with local side Avenida Estación before joining the youth system of Huachipato, where he earned a sport scholarship in 2022 and continued his development as goalkeeper.

In March 2026, Avello was part of the Santiago Wanderers squad that won the U-20 Copa Libertadores. He was the team's starting goalkeeper in the tournament and played an important role in the team's unbeaten campaign, which culminated in a penalty shootout victory over Flamengo in the final. Later, he was the starting keeper in the 3–1 loss against Real Madrid in the 2026 U20 Intercontinental Cup.

He was highlighted by the media as one of the standout players of the team, noted for his performances in decisive matches.

== Honours ==
Santiago Wanderers U20

- U-20 Copa Libertadores (1): 2026
