= Donato Hernández =

Argentine football player and manager

Personal information
- Full name: Donato Hernández Ucero
- Date of birth: 12 December 1923
- Place of birth: Luján, Buenos Aires, Argentina
- Date of death: 13 February 1987 (aged 63)
- Place of death: Buenos Aires, Argentina
- Position: Right winger

Senior career*
Years	Team	Apps	(Gls)
1941	Atlanta Luján		
1943	Buzón		
1944	Gimnasia La Plata		
1946	Almagro		
1947	San Telmo		
1948	Gimnasia de Mendoza		
1949	Racing		
1950–1953	Independiente		
1954	Huracán	6	(2)

Managerial career
- 1956–1960: Unión La Calera
- 1962: Rangers
- 1963: Santiago Wanderers
- 1964: Santiago Morning
- 1964: Ovalle Ferroviarios
- 1964–1965: Deportes Ovalle
- 1966: Santiago Wanderers
- 1967–1968: Magallanes
- 1969: Santiago Wanderers
- 1970: Unión La Calera
- 1971: Deportes La Serena
- 1972: Audax Italiano
- 1973: Unión San Felipe
- 1973–1974: Aucas
- 1974: Santiago Wanderers
- 1975: Magallanes
- 1976–1977: Unión La Calera
- 1977: Regional Antofagasta
- 1978: Deportivo Municipal
- 1979: Santiago Wanderers
- 1981: Loma Negra (advisor)
- 1983: Boca Juniors (assistant)
- 1983: Bolívar (interim)
- 1984: Deportes Ovalle
- 1986: Quintero Unido
- * Club domestic league appearances and goals

Donato Hernández Ucero (12 December 1923 – 13 February 1987) was an Argentine football winger and manager.

== Playing career ==
A winger, Hernández developed all his career in his homeland with Atlanta de Luján, Buzón de Luján, Gimnasia La Plata, Almagro, San Telmo, Gimnasia de Mendoza, Racing Club, Independiente and Huracán. With Racing Club, he won the 1949 Argentine Primera División.

== Coaching career ==
As a football manager, Hernández developed almost all his career in Chile. In Chilean Primera División, he led Rangers de Talca, Santiago Wanderers, Santiago Morning, Magallanes, Unión La Calera, Deportes La Serena Unión San Felipe and Regional Antofagasta. With Santiago Wanderers, he took part in the 1969 Copa Libertadores and made possible the senior debut of the historical Chile international player, Elías Figueroa.

In Chilean Segunda División, he led Unión La Calera, Ovalle Ferroviarios and Audax Italiano.

In others countries, Hernández led Aucas in Ecuador, Deportivo Municipal in Peru and Bolívar in Bolivia.

== Personal life ==
Hernández was born in Luján, Buenos Aires, to a Spanish parents called Serafín and Valeriana. He married and settled in Chile.
