= Francisco Palladino =

Uruguayan football manager

Personal information
- Full name: Francisco Ricardo Palladino Soba
- Date of birth: 23 January 1983 (age 43)
- Place of birth: Maldonado, Uruguay

Team information
- Current team: Santiago Wanderers (manager)

Youth career
- Years: Team
- Deportivo Maldonado

Managerial career
- Racing Montevideo (youth)
- Central Molino (youth)
- 2007–2019: Deportivo Maldonado (youth)
- 2017: Deportivo Maldonado (interim)
- 2019–2022: Deportivo Maldonado
- 2023–2024: Santiago Wanderers
- 2024: River Plate Montevideo
- 2025: Unión San Felipe
- 2026–: Santiago Wanderers

Francisco Ricardo Palladino Soba (born 23 January 1983) is a Uruguayan football manager. He is the current manager of Santiago Wanderers.

== Career ==
Born in Maldonado, Palladino joined hometown side Deportivo Maldonado's youth setup in 2007; he had already represented the club's youth categories as a player. In September 2017, after Nelson Abeijón was sacked, he was named interim manager of the main squad in the Segunda División; he was in charge of the team in a match against Miramar Misiones before returning to his previous role.

On 6 February 2019, Palladino was definitely appointed manager of Depor for the 2019 campaign. He achieved promotion to the Primera División after finishing second in his first season, helping the side to return to the top tier after 15 years.

On 8 November 2022, after qualifying Maldonado to their first-ever continental championship (2023 Copa Libertadores), Palladino left the club, and was named in charge of Chilean Primera B side Santiago Wanderers. He left the club on 22 May 2024, and returned to his home country with River Plate Montevideo on 17 June.

On 15 December 2025, Palladino was appointed as manager of Santiago Wanderers by second time.
