= Gustavo Charrupí =

Colombian footballer

Personal information
- Full name: Gustavo Adolfo Charrupí Díaz
- Date of birth: 22 July 2004 (age 22)
- Place of birth: Cali, Colombia
- Height: 1.74 m (5 ft 9 in)
- Position: Midfielder

Team information
- Current team: Everton (on loan from Atlético Bucaramanga)
- Number: 6

Youth career
- Deportivo Pasto

Senior career*
Years	Team	Apps	(Gls)
2023–2025	Deportivo Pasto	39	(0)
2025–	Atlético Bucaramanga	32	(0)
2026–	→ Everton (loan)	1	(0)
- * Club domestic league appearances and goals as of 28 July 2026

Gustavo Adolfo Charrupí Díaz (born 22 July 2004) is a Colombian footballer who currently plays as a midfielder for Chilean club Everton on loan from Atlético Bucaramanga.

== Club career ==
Born in Cali, Colombia, Charrupí was trained and started his career with Deportivo Pasto.

In July 2025, Charrupí signed with Atlético Bucaramanga and took part in the 2026 Copa Sudamericana. In July 2026, he was loaned out to Chilean club Everton de Viña del Mar on a deal until June 2027 with a purchase option and made his debut in the 1–1 away draw against Unión La Calera on 27 July.
