= Martín Villarroel =

Chilean footballer

Personal information
- Full name: Martín Ignacio Villarroel Robles
- Date of birth: 23 September 2001 (age 25)
- Place of birth: Viña del Mar, Chile
- Height: 1.74 m (5 ft 9 in)
- Position: Midfielder

Team information
- Current team: Santiago Wanderers

Youth career
- Santiago Wanderers

Senior career*
Years	Team	Apps	(Gls)
2019–2024	Santiago Wanderers	37	(0)
2022	→ Unión La Calera (loan)	4	(0)
2023	→ Cobreloa (loan)	9	(0)
2024	→ Deportes La Serena (loan)	4	(0)
2025	Deportes La Serena	6	(0)
2026–	Santiago Wanderers	0	(0)
- * Club domestic league appearances and goals as of 19 December 2025

Martín Ignacio Villarroel Robles (born 23 September 2001) is a Chilean footballer who plays as a midfielder for Santiago Wanderers.

== Club career ==
Born in Viña del Mar, Chile, Villarroel is a product of Santiago Wanderers and made his senior debut in the 2–1 away loss against Deportes Puerto Montt for the Primera B de Chile on 1 June 2019 under his father, Moisés. In the same season, Santiago Wanderers won the 2019 Primera B de Chile and got promotion to the Chilean Primera División.

The next seasons, Villarroel was loaned out to Unión La Calera (2022) in the Chilean top division, Cobreloa (2023) and Deportes La Serena (2024). As a player of Deportes La Serena, he suffered an ACL injury in March 2024. He won two consecutive Primera B de Chile league titles with Cobreloa and Deportes La Serena.

After ending his contract with Santiago Wanderers, Villarroel continued with Deportes La Serena for the 2025 Chilean Primera División.

In December 2025, Villarroel returned to Santiago Wanderers to play alongside his younger brother, Cristóbal.

== Personal life ==
Martín is the son of the former Chile international footballer Moisés Villarroel and the older brother of the footballer Cristóbal Villarroel.
