= Jorge Garcés =

Chilean footballer and manager (born 1954)

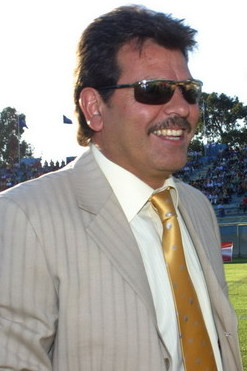
- Garcés in 2007

Personal information
- Full name: Jorge Luis Garcés Rojas
- Date of birth: 13 May 1954 (age 72)
- Place of birth: Talca, Chile
- Position: Midfielder

Senior career*
Years	Team	Apps	(Gls)
1973–1977	Santiago Wanderers		
1975	→ San Luis (loan)		
1976	→ Iberia (loan)		
1977–1979	Real España		
1979–1980	Lota Schwager		
1980–1986	Francs Borains		
1983–1984	→ Rayo Vallecano (loan)		
1984–1985	→ Universidad Católica (loan)		
1985–1986	→ Deportes La Serena (loan)		
1986–1987	RFC Arquennes		

Managerial career
- 1989–1991: RFC Arquennes
- 1992: Provincial Osorno
- 1993: Everton
- 1994–1995: Cobreloa
- 1996: Deportes Temuco
- 1997: Deportes Puerto Montt
- 1998–1999: Municipal Iquique
- 1999–2001: Santiago Wanderers
- 2001: Chile (caretaker)
- 2002–2003: Chiapas
- 2004–2005: Everton
- 2006–2007: O'Higgins
- 2008: Deportes Concepción
- 2008: Unión Española
- 2010: Santiago Wanderers
- 2011: Ñublense
- 2011: Deportes Concepción
- 2014: Rangers
- 2016: San Antonio Unido
- 2019–2020: Fernández Vial
- 2021–2022: Santiago Wanderers
- 2024: Juan Fernández (city team)
- * Club domestic league appearances and goals

Jorge Luis Garcés Rojas (born 13 May 1954) is a Chilean football manager and former player who played as a midfielder.

== Manager ==
Garcés was born in Talca. He started his managerial career in 1989 with RFC Arquennes. In 1992, he won the Primera B Championship with Provincial Osorno.

Garcés joined Santiago Wanderers in 1999, getting promotion to First Division. In 2001, the team won the First Division championship, qualifying to the Copa Libertadores.

Following the resignation of Pedro García, manager of Chile national football team in 2001, Garcés was hired by the ANFP to coach the Chilean team, getting two defeats (Brazil 2–0 Chile, Colombia 3–1 Chile) and a draw (Chile 0–0 Ecuador).

O'Higgins hired Garcés for the 2007 Clausura, finishing second in the League Table. The club also reached the semi-finals. Garcés left the team in 2007.

In 2024, he assumed as coach of the Juan Fernández Islands team for the 2024 Copa Chile.

== Outside football ==
In 2008, Garcés competed in the second season of the Chilean TV program Estrellas en el Hielo: El Baile (Stars on ice: The dance) from TVN.

In 2013, Garcés took part in the Chilean reality show Trepadores (Mountain climbers) from Mega.

In 2021, Garcés was a candidate to councillor for Talca commune. In 2025, he was a candidate to deputy for the district 7 as a member of Evópoli.

== Honours ==
Provincial Osorno

- Primera B: 1992

Santiago Wanderers

- Primera División de Chile: 2001
