= Rubens Nicola =

Brazilian footballer

Personal information
- Full name: Rubens Nicola Glagliarde Júnior
- Date of birth: 30 July 1955 (age 71)
- Place of birth: São Paulo, Brazil
- Position: Forward

Youth career
- 1964–1969: Portuguesa
- 1969–1974: Juventus da Mooca

Senior career*
Years	Team	Apps	(Gls)
1976–1978	Olaria		
1976	→ Botafogo (loan)	12	(2)
1977	→ Corinthians (loan)	1	(0)
1979	Ceará	10	(1)
1980	Unión Española	31	(9)
1981	Everton	27	(3)
1982–1983	Cobresal		
1983	Rangers	35	(6)
1984	Colo-Colo	18	(4)
1985	Audax Italiano	21	(1)
1986	Deportes Laja		
1986	Curicó Unido		
- * Club domestic league appearances and goals

Rubens Nicola Glagliarde Júnior also known as Rubens Nicola (born July 30, 1955, in São Paulo, Brazil) is a Brazilian former footballer who played for clubs in Brazil and Chile.

== Career ==
Born in São Paulo, Brazil, Nicola moved to Chile in 1979. A striker with excellent technique, he played with great success for Rangers Talca, being remembered by ranguerinos by five goals in 1983 he scored a Colo-Colo two on the first wheel in the 2-1 win that piducanos obtained in the Estadio Nacional, and three in the second round in an unforgettable 5-2 in the Estadio Fiscal de Talca.

In 1984, Colo-Colo decides to hire managing to have good performances, despite the poor performance of the team in that year.

Presently living in Brazil, where he devoted himself to the care of a restaurant in the city of Cabo Frio, on the outskirts of Rio de Janeiro. Linked to football continues as Chairman of the Football League Cabofriense.

== Teams ==
- (Brazil) Portuguesa 1964-1969
- (Brazil) Juventus da Mooca 1969-1974
- (Brazil) Botafogo 1975-1976
- (Brazil) Olaria 1977
- (Brazil) Corinthians 1977
- (Brazil) Olaria 1978
- (Brazil) Ceará 1978
- (Chile) Unión Española 1979-1980
- (Chile) Everton 1981
- (Chile) Cobresal 1982–1983
- (Chile) Rangers 1983
- (Chile) Colo-Colo 1984
- (Chile) Audax Italiano 1985
- (Chile) Deportes Laja 1986
- (Chile) Curicó Unido 1986

== Honours ==
Corinthians

- Campeonato Paulista: 1977
