= Club Deportivo Luis Cruz Martínez =

Chilean football club

Luis Cruz Martínez
- Full name: Fútbol Club Luis Cruz; Martínez de Curicó
- Nickname: Ele U
- Founded: October 5, 1905
- Ground: Estadio ANFA Luis H. Alvarez; Curicó; Chile
- Capacity: 1,000
- League: Curicó Amateur
- 1966: Primera B, 15th
Home colours	Away colours

Fútbol Club Luis Cruz Martínez, is a Chilean football club based in the city of Curicó, Maule Region, which honors Luis Cruz Martínez, the local hero of the War of the Pacific, who died into battle.

They currently play in the Curicó Amateur Association.

Between 1962 and 1966, a period of 5 years, they were continuously members of Chile's second high professional level although they never won promotion to the top level, the Primera Division.

== History ==
Luis Cruz Martínez were founded in October, 1905, with Juan B. Forbe as the first President. It was one of the first football clubs in the city.

Before 56 years of amateur football life, the club authorities won the right to play professional football at the Second level, the Segunda Division league.

Luis Cruz first appearance in a professional tournament was the Copa Chile 1962, when Luis Cruz went on to win the tournament, stunning three First Division teams to win the Cup.

In the opening match against Lister Rossel at Linares, Luis Cruz achieved a 3–1 victory. One week later, they beats Ñublense on penalties. The next week they won over the first division side Unión Española, by 2–0. Later they reached the semifinals to beat Santiago Wanderers, another first level team, 1–0. In the final Luis Cruz faced off with the reigning national champions Universidad Católica on their home ground, the Estadio Independencia in Santiago in front of a crowd of 10,000 people, 1,500 of them Luis Cruz Martínez fans who made the trip from Curicó to the Chilean capital city. Luis Cruz won 2–1, and Verdugo and Riquelme scored the goals for the new champions.

Since then, the club struggles to show good results on the pitch, and they lose the category at the 1966 season, returning to the Curicó Amateur Football Association, until today.

== Honours ==
- Copa Chile

Winners (1): 1962

- 5 seasons in Segunda Division

== Records ==
- Record victory — 7-1 v. Valparaíso Ferroviario (Segunda Division 1963)
- Record defeat — 0-7 v. Lister Rossel (Segunda Division 1966)
- Segunda Division Best Position — 5th (1962 & 1965)

== Notable managers ==
- (Paraguay) Ovidio Casartelli
- (Chile) Guillermo Díaz

== See also ==
- Curicó Unido
