= Josué Ovalle =

Chilean footballer

Personal information
- Full name: Josué Miguel Nehemías Ovalle Aranda
- Date of birth: 20 May 2000 (age 26)
- Place of birth: Algarrobo, Chile
- Height: 1.67 m (5 ft 6 in)
- Position: Winger

Team information
- Current team: Everton

Youth career
- El Manzano
- Unión Santo Domingo
- 2017–2019: Colo-Colo

Senior career*
Years	Team	Apps	(Gls)
2020–2021	Deportes Linares	12	(2)
2021	San Antonio Unido	13	(7)
2022–2024	Deportes Melipilla	65	(11)
2025–2026	Deportes Limache	4	(0)
2025	→ Deportes Concepción (loan)	21	(4)
2026	→ Mazatlán (loan)	12	(5)
2026–	Everton	0	(0)
- * Club domestic league appearances and goals as of 13 July 2026

Josué Miguel Nehemías Ovalle Aranda (born 20 May 2000) is a Chilean footballer who plays as a winger for Liga de Primera club Everton.

== Club career ==
Born in Algarrobo, Chile, Ovalle was with local clubs El Manzano and Unión Santo Domingo before joining the Colo-Colo youth ranks in 2017. After winning the 2019 Torneo Apertura Proyección with the Colo-Colo under-21 team, he moved to Deportes Linares in 2020. The next year, he switched to San Antonio Unido.

From 2022 to 2024, Ovalle played for Deportes Melipilla. In 2024, he was selected the best player of the Segunda División Profesional de Chile.

In December 2024, Ovalle signed with Deportes Limache in the Chilean Primera División. In the second half of the same yar, he was loaned out to Deportes Concepción. In February 2026, he moved abroad and joined Liga MX club Mazatlán on a one-year loan. He scored his first goal abroad in the 1–1 away draw against Tijuana on 22 February.

Back to Chile, Ovalle signed with Everton de Viña del Mar on a deal until June 2028.

== Honours ==
Individual

- Segunda División Profesional de Chile Best Player: 2024
