= Javier di Gregorio =

Argentine-born Chilean footballer (born 1977)

Personal information
- Full name: Javier Eduardo di Gregorio Hoste
- Date of birth: 23 January 1977 (age 49)
- Place of birth: Mendoza, Argentina
- Height: 1.84 m (6 ft 0 in)
- Position: Goalkeeper

Youth career
- Universidad Católica

Senior career*
| Years | Team | Apps | (Gls) |
| 1997 | Deportes Antofagasta | 0 | (0) |
| 1998–2003 | Coquimbo Unido | 66 | (0) |
| 2001 | → Huachipato (loan) | 13 | (0) |
| 2004 | Salamanca | 13 | (0) |
| 2004 | Atlético Mexiquense | 1 | (0) |
| 2005 | Deportes Puerto Montt | 17 | (0) |
| 2007 | Deportivo Temuco | 7 | (0) |
| 2008 | Coquimbo Unido | 23 | (0) |
| 2009 | Deportes Melipilla | 4 | (0) |
| Total | | 144 | (0) |

International career
| 2000 | Chile Olympic | 7 | (0) |
| 2007 | Chile | 1 | (0) |

Managerial career
- 2013–2014: Deportes Iquique (gk coach)
- 2014: Deportes Antofagasta (gk coach)
- 2014–2022: Deportes Iquique (gk coach)
- 2023–2025: Deportes Iquique (sporting director)
- 2026–: Rangers de Talca (gk coach)
- * Club domestic league appearances and goals

Javier Eduardo di Gregorio Hoste (born 23 January 1977) is an Argentine-born Chilean former footballer who played as goalkeeper. His last club was Deportes Melipilla, in the age, Primera B de Chile (second-tier) member.

He was member of Chile Olympic Team's 22-man squad which won a bronze medal in Sydney 2000 Olympic Games.

== Club career ==
=== Early career ===
Di Gregorio was born in the city of Mendoza in Argentina's homologous province. Then, he began his career in the football academy of Chilean giants Club Deportivo Universidad Católica. Nevertheless, he left Católica to join Deportes Antofagasta and next Coquimbo Unido under José Sulantay.

In 2001, he was sent on loan to Club Deportivo Huachipato. Three years later, after the same number of seasons defending the Coquimbo's goal, he moved to Mexico to play for Nacional Tijuana during the first semester, and for Atlético Mexiquense in the second semester.

==== Puerto Montt ====
In 2005, after a frustrated spell in Mexico, he returned to his country and signed for top-level team Deportes Puerto Montt. Nevertheless, on 25 July 2005, he alongside team were involved in a traffic accident when they were coming back by bus from Talca. He was the most damaged by the accident, having to face a six-month injury. His teammate, the Argentinian forward, Julio César Laffatigue, declared: "Thank God we are alive, because it was a terrible thing".

=== Deportivo Temuco ===
After all the 2006 season without professionally play, in early 2007, he joined Primera B side Deportivo Temuco. There, he gained notoriety through the docu-reality about the team, called Temuco, La Última Frontera (Temuco, The Last Frontier) which was centered in the daily live of team's coach Eduardo Bonvallet, who replaced the outgoing coach, Carlos González Romero on 23 April 2007. Despite the docu-reality was centered in Bonvallet's daily life, di Gregorio became briefly famous after being called up to the national team on 15 May to face Cuba, and then for being marginalized from the team after disobeying Bonvallet, after he decided to send him to the bench in a match with Provincial Osorno on 26 May. That match, Temuco won by 2–1 at the Old Estadio Municipal Germán Becker.

On 6 June 2007, he announced his disengagement from the team. Eight years later, on 19 September 2015, for the purpose of Bonvallet's death after he committed suicide a day ago, among the memories and anecdotes that Emol emphasized on the part of those who were directed by Bonvallet, Luis Gabriel Valenzuela (di Gregorio's teammate in the age), remembered another tense episode which catapulted di Gregorio's marginalization: to have arrived late to train.

=== Retirement ===
After playing the entire 2008 season for Primera B side Coquimbo Unido, the following year he ended his career with Deportes Melipilla (team of the same category).

== International career ==
After deciding to be eligible to play for Chile national team, di Gregorio joined to Chile olympic's under-23 national team to play in the 2000 CONMEBOL Men Pre-Olympic Tournament, qualifier for Sydney Olympic Games.

He played all of Chile's seven matches in the Pre-Olympic Tournament, being the most important, the match where Chile, on 6 February 2000, achieved an historical 1–0 win over Argentina U-23 at Londrina, which qualified the Chilean team to the Olympic Games.

He didn't play any match in the Olympic Games, where Chile reached the bronze medal following beat 2–0 to United States national team in the Third Place Match held at Sydney Football Stadium.

On 15 May 2007, following a five-year absence (his last call-up was in 2002 for a match against Argentina corresponding to 2002 FIFA World Cup qualification), it was reported that di Gregorio was re-called to play a friendly match against Cuba. Finally, on 16 May, he was sent-on in the 85' minute, replacing to Cobreloa's goalkeeper, Fernando Hurtado, in a 3–0 win at Estadio Municipal Germán Becker.

== Post-retirement ==
In 2013, Di Gregorio became the goalkeeping coach of Deportes Iquique under Jaime Vera. In the second half of 2014, he followed Vera in Deportes Antofagasta. Working for Deportes Iquique, he took part in the training of the Chile international goalkeeper Brayan Cortés.

On 10 November 2022, Di Gregorio assumed as sporting director of Deportes Iquique. He was released on 11 December 2025.

== Honours ==
=== National team ===
Chile

- Summer Olympics (1): 2000 Sydney (bronze)
