= Félix Díaz (footballer) =

Argentine footballer (1927–2004)

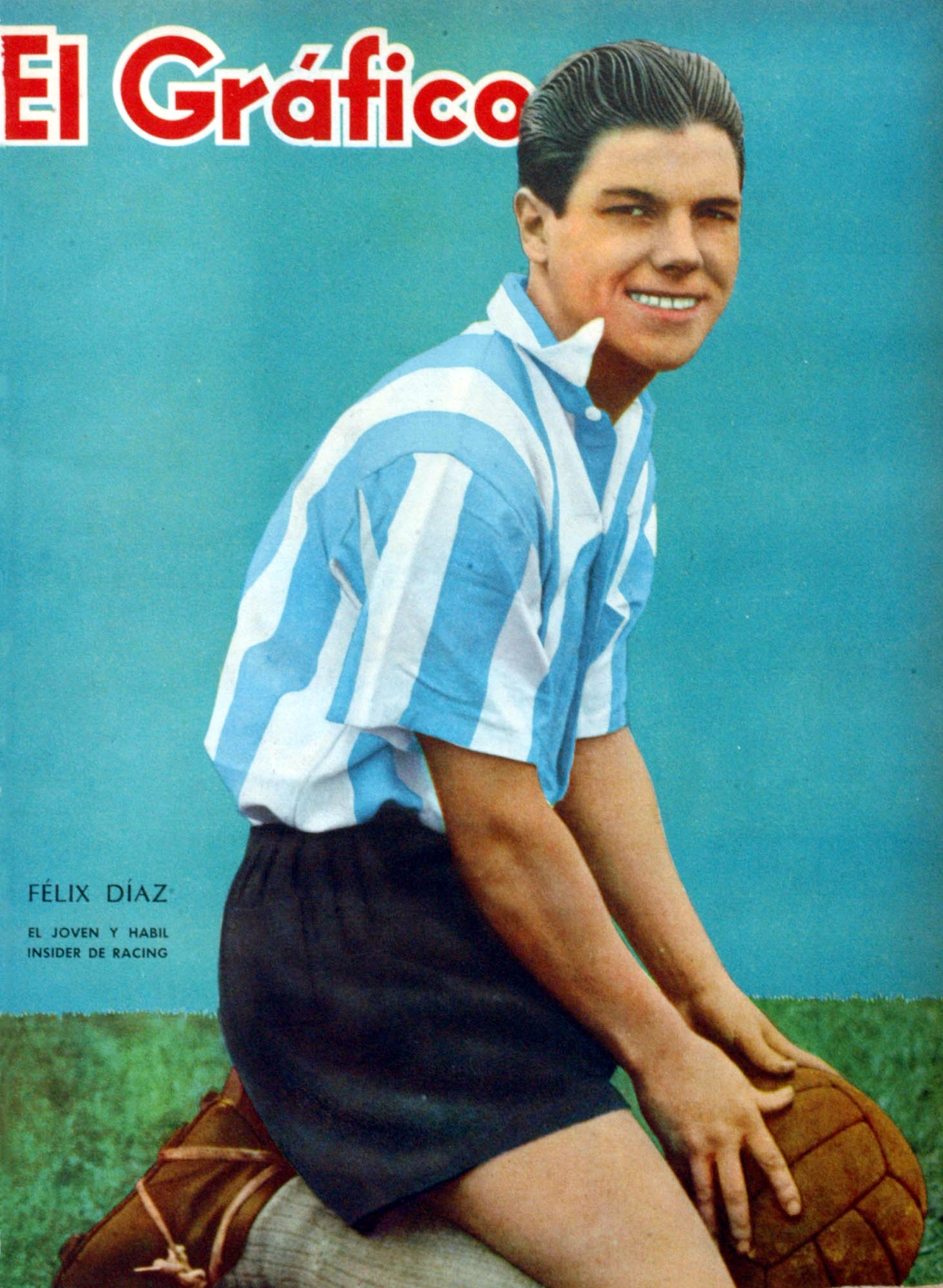

Personal information
- Full name: Félix Díaz Marcos
- Date of birth: 27 February 1927
- Place of birth: Buenos Aires, Argentina
- Date of death: 25 February 2004 (aged 76)
- Place of death: Avellaneda, Argentina

Senior career*
Years	Team	Apps	(Gls)
1940–1944	Racing Club	106	(56)
1945	Newell's Old Boys	19	(4)
1946	Atlanta	21	(9)
1947	Gimnasia y Esgrima La Plata		
1949–1952	Green Cross	36	(21)
1953–1956	Santiago Wanderers		
- *Club domestic league appearances and goals

Félix Díaz Marcos (27 February 1927 – 25 February 2004) was a footballer who played for clubs in Argentina and Chile. He died in Avellaneda on 25 February 2004, at the age of 76.

== Teams ==
- Racing Club 1940–1944
- Newell's Old Boys 1945
- Atlanta 1946
- Gimnasia y Esgrima de La Plata 1947
- Green Cross 1949–1952
- Santiago Wanderers 1953–1956

== Honours ==
- Green Cross 1950 (Top Scorer Chilean Championship)
