= Pedro García (footballer, born 1946) =

Chilean footballer

Pedro García Barros
Personal information
- Full name: Pedro García Barros
- Date of birth: 3 April 1946 (age 80)
- Place of birth: Santiago, Chile
- Position: Attacking midfielder

Senior career*
Years	Team	Apps	(Gls)
1965	Green Cross		
1966–1970	Unión Española		
1971–1972	Colo-Colo		
1973	O'Higgins		
1973	UNAM		
1974–1975	Deportes La Serena		

International career
1967	Chile	2	(0)

Managerial career
- 1978–1979: Chile U20
- 1978: Unión Española
- 1979: Deportes Arica
- 1980: Deportes Concepción
- 1981–1985: Colo-Colo
- 1986: Filanbanco
- 1987–1988: León
- 1988–1989: Puebla
- 1989–1991: Monterrey
- 1992: Unión Española
- 1992: Atlas
- 1993: Deportes La Serena
- 1993–1994: Santos Laguna
- 1998: Santiago Wanderers
- 2001: Chile
- 2009: Huachipato
- * Club domestic league appearances and goals

Pedro García Barros (born 3 April 1946) is a football manager and former Chilean football midfielder, who made his debut for the Chile national football team on 1967-09-19.

== Manager honours ==
=== Club ===
Colo-Colo

- Primera División de Chile (2): 1981, 1983
- Copa Chile (3): 1981, 1982, 1985
