= 1958 Campeonato Nacional Primera División =

Campeonato Nacional de Fútbol Profesional
- Dates: 17 May 1958 – 30 November 1958
- Champions: Santiago Wanderers (1st title)
- Relegated: Green Cross
- Matches: 182
- Goals: 646 (3.55 per match)
- Top goalscorer: Gustavo Albella; Carlos Verdejo (23 goals)
- Highest attendance: 39,751 Universidad Católica 0–1 Universidad de Chile (29 November)
- Total attendance: 1,336,764
- Average attendance: 7,344

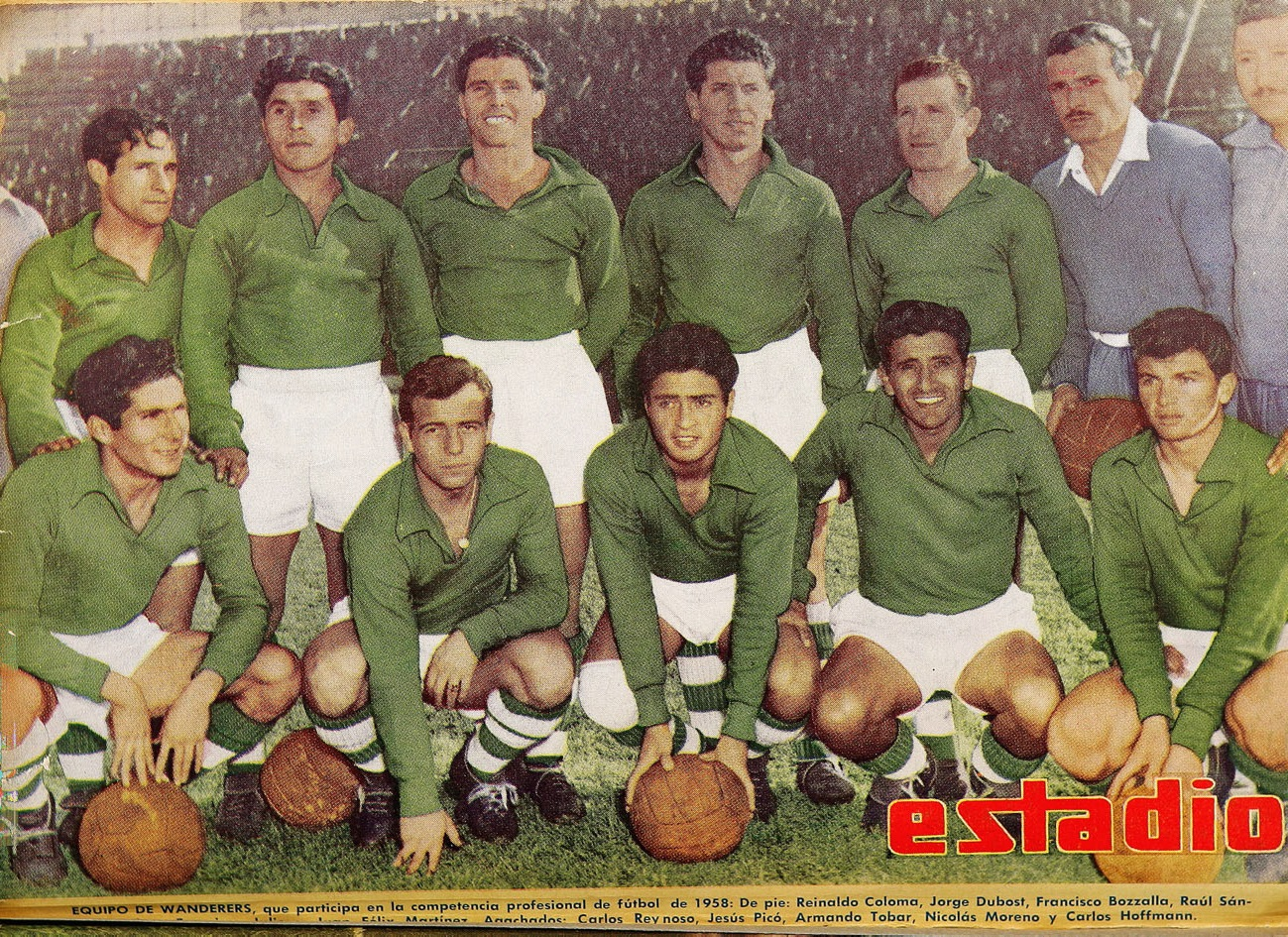
Santiago Wanderers 1958.

The 1958 Campeonato Nacional de Fútbol Profesional, was the 26th season of top-flight football in Chile. Santiago Wanderers won their first ever title.

== Standings ==
Pos	Team	Pld	W	D	L	GF	GA	GD	Pts
1	Santiago Wanderers (C)	26	13	8	5	41	31	+10	34
2	Colo-Colo	26	13	7	6	62	48	+14	33
3	Deportes La Serena	26	14	5	7	54	45	+9	33
4	Palestino	26	10	11	5	55	43	+12	31
5	Universidad de Chile	26	13	5	8	41	37	+4	31
6	Universidad Católica	26	9	9	8	51	47	+4	27
7	Ferrobádminton	26	10	4	12	35	34	+1	24
8	Everton	26	11	2	13	50	50	0	24
9	O'Higgins	26	10	3	13	48	51	−3	23
10	Unión Española	26	8	6	12	42	52	−10	22
11	Audax Italiano	26	8	6	12	42	57	−15	22
12	Green Cross	26	8	5	13	50	57	−7	21
13	Rangers	26	6	9	11	36	42	−6	21
14	Magallanes	26	5	8	13	39	52	−13	18

(C) Champions

Primera División de Chile
1958 Campeonato Profesional
champions

1st title

== Scores ==
Home \ Away	AUD	COL	EVE	FEB	GCR	DLS	MAG	OHI	PAL	RAN	UES	UCA	UCH	SWA
Audax		1–3	2–1	2–3	3–6	2–3	2–1	2–1	2–1	1–1	1–0	3–3	3–2	0–0
Colo-Colo	1–1		5–3	5–1	4–2	1–3	2–0	3–1	1–1	1–1	5–3	2–2	1–1	3–4
Everton	4–0	3–0		3–2	2–1	2–2	2–3	4–0	2–3	3–1	4–3	1–4	2–0	3–1
Ferrobádminton	2–0	0–1	4–2		0–0	2–0	2–1	3–0	1–1	0–1	2–2	2–2	1–3	0–1
Green Cross	1–4	5–1	2–3	0–3		2–5	3–2	1–2	2–2	4–1	3–0	2–0	3–3	0–1
La Serena	3–1	2–4	2–1	2–0	0–1		2–0	3–2	3–3	2–2	1–0	2–1	0–0	1–2
Magallanes	1–1	3–5	0–0	0–2	3–1	3–3		3–6	0–0	2–1	2–2	0–2	2–0	1–1
O'Higgins	3–2	0–2	4–0	1–0	4–2	3–4	4–1		1–3	1–0	2–1	2–2	1–0	2–2
Palestino	4–2	2–2	2–3	1–0	6–3	2–3	2–1	2–1		3–1	5–1	2–2	3–1	1–1
Rangers	1–2	1–1	1–0	1–2	0–2	0–1	1–0	3–3	3–3		1–1	2–2	0–1	4–0
U. Española	4–0	2–4	2–0	1–2	1–1	4–2	1–5	2–1	3–0	1–4		2–1	2–1	1–1
U. Católica	2–2	2–1	3–1	2–1	2–2	2–1	1–1	2–1	3–2	2–3	2–3		0–1	3–0
U. de Chile	3–2	3–2	2–1	1–0	2–1	1–3	2–2	2–1	1–1	4–2	2–0	3–1		1–0
S. Wanderers	3–1	1–2	1–0	1–0	3–0	4–1	4–2	2–1	0–0	0–0	0–0	5–3	3–1	

Legend: Blue = home team win; Yellow = draw; Red = away team win.

== Relegation ==
Pos	Team	1956	1957	1958	Average
1	Deportes La Serena	--	--	33	33,00
2	Colo-Colo	38	25	33	32,00
3	Santiago Wanderers	33	27	34	31,33
4	Palestino	25	28	31	28,00
5	Universidad de Chile	21	31	31	27,67
6	Audax Italiano	26	34	22	27,33
7	Rangers	31	26	21	26,00
7	Unión Española	30	26	22	26,00
9	Everton	27	26	24	25,67
10	Magallanes	29	25	18	24,00
10	Universidad Católica	--	21	27	24,00
12	O'Higgins	26	21	23	23,33
13	Green Cross	23	23	21	22,33
14	Ferrobádminton	19	21	24	21,33

Relegated to 1959 Segunda División de Chile

== Topscorer ==
Name	Team	Goals
(Argentina) Gustavo Albella	Green Cross	23
(Chile) Carlos Verdejo	Deportes La Serena	23

== See also ==
- 1958 Copa Chile
