= Fernando Hurtado (footballer, born 1983) =

Chilean footballer (born 1983)

Personal information
- Full name: Fernando Javier Hurtado Pérez
- Date of birth: 5 April 1983 (age 43)
- Place of birth: Santiago, Chile
- Height: 1.88 m (6 ft 2 in)
- Position: Goalkeeper

Team information
- Current team: Deportes Antofagasta

Youth career
- Cobreloa

Senior career*
Years	Team	Apps	(Gls)
2003–2010	Cobreloa	144	(0)
2004	→ Deportes Antofagasta (loan)	5	(0)
2011	Unión San Felipe	0	(0)
2012–2021	Deportes Antofagasta	57	(0)
2022–2024	Santiago Wanderers	41	(0)
2025–	Deportes Antofagasta	0	(0)

International career^{‡}
2007	Chile	1	(0)
- * Club domestic league appearances and goals as of 25 December 2024 ‡ National team caps and goals as of 7 June 2007

Fernando Javier Hurtado Pérez (born 5 April 1983) is a Chilean footballer that currently plays for Deportes Antofagasta as a goalkeeper.

== Club career ==
Born in the capital city Santiago de Chile, prior to moving to Antofagasta Region, he attended to Instituto Alonso de Ercilla where did the high school. Once settled in his country's second region, he joined to Cobreloa youth ranks.

Hurtado began his career at Deportes Antofagasta, but the most part of his career was developed in Chilean powerhouse Cobreloa. In that team he was the first-choice keeper during five years (2005–2010), becoming a club's important player in the 2000s.

From 2005 to 2010, he played as first-choice keeper for Cobreloa.

In 2011, he signed for Unión San Felipe, but didn't play any game in the year due to an achilles tendon injury.

In 2012, Hurtado returned to Antofagasta. In 2022, he switched to Santiago Wanderers, spending three seasons with them. He returned again to Deportes Antofagasta for the 2025 season.

== International career ==
His performances in Cobreloa allowed him to be called for the Chilean national team’s 2007 Copa América 23-roster man.

On 16 May 2007, Hurtado made his international debut for Chile in a 2–0 win over Cuba at Estadio Germán Becker, being replaced for Javier di Gregorio in the 85th minute, during a friendly match played in Temuco. The scores for Chile were of the striker Roberto Gutiérrez in the 40th minute and the playmaker Daniel González — then player of O'Higgins — in the 70th minute.

After a game against Haiti on May 23, 2007, it was reported that Miguel Pinto refused the nomination from coach Nelson Acosta, because he said him that would be the third choice goalkeeper for the Copa América. In the face of that, Hurtado replaced Pinto and join of the squad, being the third choice keeper finally.
