= 1961 Copa Chile Green Cross =

Tournament details
- Country: Chile

Final positions
- Champions: Santiago Wanderers
- Runners-up: Universidad Católica

The 1961 Copa Chile Green Cross was the fourth edition of the Chilean Cup tournament. The competition started on March 11, 1961, and concluded on June 29, 1961. Santiago Wanderers won the competition for the second time, beating Universidad Católica on goal difference.

Matches were scheduled to be played at the stadium of the team named first on the date specified for each round. From the beginning of the second Round, if scores were level after 90 minutes had been played, an extra time took place.

== Calendar ==
Round	Date
First round	11 March 1961; 19 April 1961
Second round	22–23 April 1961
Quarterfinals	14 May 1961
Semifinals	21–23 May 1961
Final	1–29 June 1961

== First round ==
Teams			Scores		Tie-breakers
Team #1	Agg.	Team #2	1st leg	2nd leg	Replay
Ferrobádminton	4–2	Ñublense	1–1	3–1	—
Naval	6–14	Colo-Colo	4–7	2–7	—
Magallanes	2–3	Unión La Calera	1–1	1–2	—
Selección Iquique	2–4	Deportes La Serena	2–1	0–3	—
Unión Española	6–1	Selección Antofagasta	4–0	2–1	—
Trasandino	0–4	Universidad de Chile	0–1	0–3	—
Deportes Colchagua	8–11	Santiago Morning	6–4	2–7	—
Audax Italiano	4–5	Selección Schwager	3–3	1–2	—
Selección Temuco	5–6	Rangers	3–1	0–2	2–3
Palestino	6–6 (ct)	Coquimbo Unido	2–2	1–1	2–2
San Luis	1–3	San Bernardo Central	1–2	0–1	—
Unión San Felipe	2–5	Santiago Wanderers	1–2	1–3	—
Green Cross	1–2	Selección Osorno	1–1	0–1	—
Selección Regional Central	2–11	Universidad Católica	1–3	1–8	—
Iberia	2–7	O'Higgins	1–2	1–5	—
Selección Copiapó	0–13	Everton	0–5	0–8	—

== Second round ==
Home team	Score	Away team
Universidad de Chile	4–0	Unión Española
Universidad Católica	1–0	Colo-Colo
Unión La Calera	3–1	Santiago Morning
O'Higgins	1–2	Santiago Wanderers
Rangers	3–7	Everton
Selección Osorno	0–2	Ferrobádminton
Selección Schwager	2–0	San Bernardo Central
Deportes La Serena	2–1	Coquimbo Unido

== Quarterfinals ==
Home team	Score	Away team
Santiago Wanderers	6–0	Unión La Calera
Everton	1–0	Selección Schwager
Deportes La Serena	4–2	Universidad de Chile
Universidad Católica	2–0	Ferrobádminton

== Semifinals ==
May 21, 1961

Deportes La Serena	0 – 4	Universidad Católica
		25' Nackwacki; 62' (o.g.) Véliz; 86' Triguilli; 89' Pesce

Estadio La Portada, La Serena
Attendance: 5,854
Referee: M. Gasc

May 21, 1961

Everton	1 – 1 (a.e.t.)	Santiago Wanderers
Betta 51'		4' R. Díaz

Estadio Sausalito, Viña del Mar
Attendance: 6,700
Referee: R. Bulnes

May 23, 1961

Santiago Wanderers	2 – 1	Everton
R. Díaz 8'; Hoffmann 39'		48' Alcaíno

Estadio Valparaíso, Valparaíso
Attendance: 4,814
Referee: S. Bustamante

== Finals ==
June 1, 1961

Santiago Wanderers	1 – 2	Universidad Católica
Hoffmann 49'		17', 60' Pesce

Estadio Valparaíso, Valparaíso
Attendance: 4,663
Referee: L. Cantillana

June 29, 1961

Universidad Católica	0 – 2	Santiago Wanderers
		23' R. Díaz; 25' Hoffmann

Estadio Independencia, Santiago
Attendance: 8,553
Referee: D. Massaro

== Top goalscorers ==
- Antolín Sepúlveda (Rangers) 6 goals
- Carlos Hoffmann (Santiago Wanderers) 6 goals
- Mario Soto (U. Católica) 6 goals

== See also ==
- 1961 Campeonato Nacional
- Primera B
