= 1950 Campeonato Nacional Primera División =

Campeonato Nacional de Fútbol Profesional
- Dates: 15 July 1950 – 14 January 1951
- Champions: Everton (1st title)
- Matches: 133
- Goals: 551 (4.14 per match)
- Top goalscorer: Félix Díaz (21 goals)
- Biggest home win: Everton 7–0 Iberia (6 January)
- Highest attendance: 53,169 Universidad Católica 2–1 Universidad de Chile (3 September)
- Total attendance: 1,000,530
- Average attendance: 7,522

The 1950 Campeonato Nacional de Fútbol Profesional was Chilean first tier’s 18th season. Everton were the champions, being the first team from outside Santiago to win the national league.

Previous to the start of the tournament Ferroviarios and Badminton merged to form Ferrobadminton.

The tournament was played in a Round-robin tournament system.

== Scores ==
	AUD	COL	EVE	FEB	GCR	IBE	MAG	SMO	UES	UCA	UCH	SWA
Audax		1–1	2–2	2–3	3–0	5–4	3–0	7–5	1–1	3–3	4–2	1–1
Colo-Colo	4–1		2–2	2–1	2–0	3–1	5–1	0–3	0–4	2–0	1–1	3–1
Everton	4–2	0–0		4–2	1–2	7–0	4–2	2–4	3–0	4–3	5–2	1–3
Ferrobádminton	4–1	3–2	1–2		6–3	3–3	4–1	1–3	0–3	1–0	2–2	1–4
Green Cross	2–4	1–2	1–1	4–1		5–2	1–1	2–2	2–2	2–2	1–2	2–3
Iberia	0–2	1–1	1–1	1–1	2–6		1–3	4–2	0–3	2–3	1–4	0–0
Magallanes	2–1	0–2	3–1	2–2	5–4	1–1		2–3	3–5	2–1	3–2	1–2
S. Morning	4–1	1–3	1–2	3–4	6–3	2–6	0–4		2–4	4–1	0–0	1–2
U. Española	1–3	2–2	1–1	3–1	5–3	5–4	1–0	0–3		4–3	3–2	3–0
U. Católica	0–0	3–4	0–5	2–0	2–2	1–3	2–0	1–1	3–3		2–1	0–3
U. de Chile	2–4	2–0	1–2	1–3	3–4	2–1	1–2	1–2	3–3	1–0		2–3
S. Wanderers	2–2	1–1	0–2	3–3	3–3	1–0	0–1	1–1	3–1	3–1	1–2	

== Standings ==
Pos	Team	Pld	W	D	L	GF	GA	GD	Pts	Qualification
1	Everton	22	12	6	4	56	33	+23	30	Qualified to the championship playoff
2	Unión Española	22	12	6	4	57	42	+15	30	Qualified to the championship playoff
3	Colo-Colo	22	11	7	4	42	30	+12	29	
4	Santiago Wanderers	22	10	7	5	40	32	+8	27	
5	Audax Italiano	22	9	7	6	53	47	+6	25	
6	Santiago Morning	22	9	4	9	53	51	+2	22	
7	Ferrobádminton	22	8	5	9	47	51	−4	21	
8	Magallanes	22	9	3	10	39	46	−7	21	
9	Green Cross	22	5	7	10	53	60	−7	17	
10	Universidad de Chile	22	6	4	12	39	47	−8	16	
11	Universidad Católica	22	4	6	12	33	50	−17	14	
12	Iberia	22	3	6	13	38	61	−23	12	

== Championship playoff ==
Everton and Unión Española ended up tied in points at the end of the 22 weeks of regular season. Tournament rules establish that, unlike any other position on the table, if two or more teams are equal in points at the end of play, goal difference does not count and a playoff game is required. Everton won that match and was crowned as champion.

14 January 1951

Unión Española	0 – 1 (a.e.t.)	Everton
		104' Meléndez

Estadio Nacional, Santiago
Attendance: 42,551
Referee: W. Crawford

Campeonato Profesional
1950 champions

Everton
1st title

== Topscorer ==
Name	Team	Goals
(Argentina) Félix Díaz	Green Cross	21

== Sources ==
- Chile 1950 (RSSSF)
