= 1952 Campeonato Nacional Primera División =

Campeonato Nacional de Fútbol Profesional
- Dates: 24 May 1952 – 25 January 1953
- Champions: Everton (2nd title)
- Matches: 198
- Goals: 763 (3.85 per match)
- Top goalscorer: René Meléndez (30 goals)
- Biggest home win: Santiago Wanderers 5–0 Magallanes (19 November)
- Highest attendance: 58,657 Universidad Católica 2–3 Universidad de Chile (12 October)
- Total attendance: 1,650,670
- Average attendance: 8,336

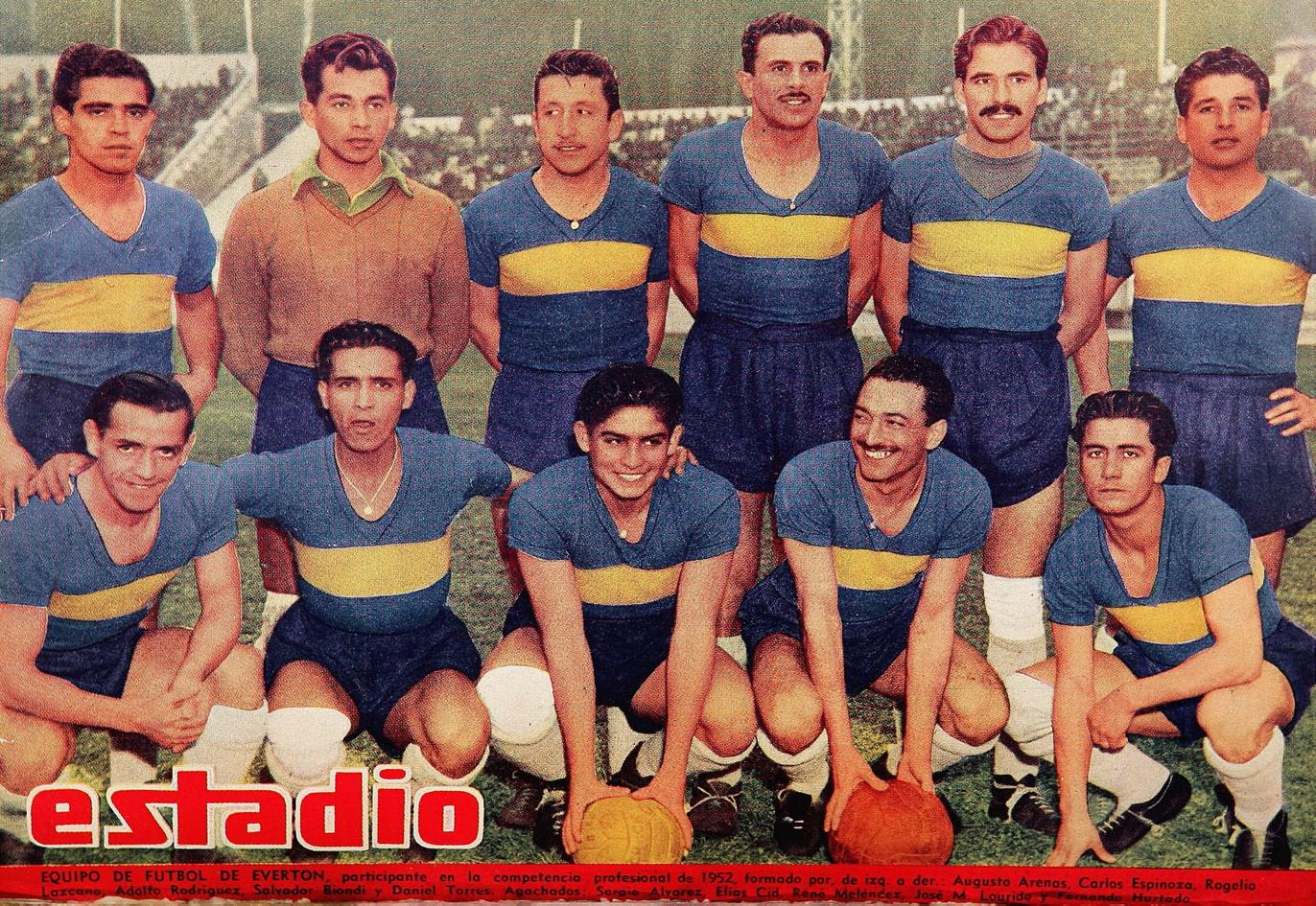
A picture of some of the season’s winning team, Everton

The 1952 Campeonato Nacional de Fútbol Profesional was first tier’s 20th season. Everton were the tournament’s champions.

== Scores ==
=== Matches 1–22 ===
During matches 1–22 each team played every other team twice.

	AUD	COL	EVE	FEB	GCR	IBE	MAG	SMO	UES	UCA	UCH	SWA
Audax		3–3	1–2	2–0	1–0	2–3	5–1	4–2	1–1	0–0	1–1	1–0
Colo-Colo	1–1		3–3	1–2	3–1	4–1	3–1	3–2	2–1	1–0	3–1	3–1
Everton	3–1	1–0		1–0	3–4	5–1	3–2	3–1	2–1	4–2	1–1	5–2
Ferrobádminton	2–2	3–2	2–3		0–0	4–4	4–2	2–3	2–2	2–0	2–0	2–1
Green Cross	0–3	1–2	1–3	0–1		2–2	1–3	1–3	0–1	3–5	0–0	2–2
Iberia	2–3	0–1	5–2	0–3	6–2		2–4	2–2	3–1	2–1	3–0	2–2
Magallanes	2–0	2–2	0–0	1–2	4–2	2–2		1–4	3–2	4–2	4–3	0–5
S. Morning	2–1	1–2	0–1	1–4	1–0	2–4	1–0		3–0	2–3	3–1	1–1
U. Española	2–3	1–1	2–2	4–2	5–1	5–2	2–0	2–2		3–1	4–4	2–4
U. Católica	2–4	2–2	4–1	1–1	6–3	1–3	3–2	3–1	1–1		2–3	3–2
U. de Chile	2–2	1–0	2–1	3–0	3–4	3–1	2–0	0–0	2–1	1–0		1–1
S. Wanderers	1–2	1–1	1–2	1–1	6–2	3–2	0–2	3–2	3–4	0–1	1–0	

=== Matches 23–33 ===
During matches 23–33 each team played every other team once. This means that during matches 1-33 each team played every other team 3 times.

	AUD	COL	EVE	FEB	GCR	IBE	MAG	SMO	UES	UCA	UCH	SWA
Audax			0–4		1–1	2–2		1–2	0–3	3–2		3–1
Colo-Colo	0–3			2–0	4–4	5–2		2–2		3–0		2–1
Everton		1–4		2–0	4–0	2–1	5–1		2–1	1–0		0–1
Ferrobádminton	2–1				2–3		4–5	5–1			5–1	
Green Cross											2–1	
Iberia				2–3	2–4		2–4	1–2		1–1	1–3	
Magallanes	1–1	1–1			3–2				1–1	3–3		
S. Morning			2–1		3–5		2–1			1–0		
U. Española		1–1		1–0	1–2	3–2		2–1				1–1
U. Católica				1–1	2–2				3–3			
U. de Chile	2–1	0–1	2–5				0–1	2–6	2–4	1–3		3–2
S. Wanderers				2–2	2–2	6–2	0–2	4–3		0–1		

== Standings ==
Pos	Team	Pld	W	D	L	GF	GA	GD	Pts	Qualification
1	Everton	33	22	4	7	78	48	+30	48	Champions
2	Colo-Colo	33	17	11	5	68	45	+23	45	
3	Ferrobádminton	33	14	8	11	65	55	+10	36	
4	Audax Italiano	33	13	10	10	59	52	+7	36	
5	Unión Española	33	12	11	10	68	59	+9	35	
6	Santiago Morning	33	14	5	14	64	65	−1	33	
7	Magallanes	33	13	7	13	63	71	−8	33	
8	Universidad Católica	33	10	9	14	59	64	−5	29	
9	Universidad de Chile	33	11	7	15	51	65	−14	29	
10	Santiago Wanderers	33	9	9	15	61	62	−1	27	
11	Iberia	33	8	7	18	70	89	−19	23	
12	Green Cross	33	7	8	18	57	88	−31	22	

Campeonato Profesional
1952 champions

Everton
2nd title

== Topscorer ==
Name	Team	Goals
(Chile) René Meléndez	Everton	30
