= Everton de Viña del Mar =

Association football club in Chile

Everton
- Full name: Everton de Viña del Mar S.A.D.P.
- Nicknames: Los oro y cielo (The gold and sky-blue); Ruleteros (Rouletters); Los del Cerro (The Ones from the Hill)
- Founded: 24 June 1909; 117 years ago
- Ground: Sausalito Stadium, Viña del Mar
- Capacity: 23,423
- Owner: Grupo Pachuca
- Chairman: Pedro Cedillo Martínez
- Manager: Javier Torrente
- League: Liga de Primera
- 2025: Liga de Primera, 14th of 16
- Website: everton.cl
Home colours	Away colours

Everton de Viña del Mar is a Chilean football club based in the city of Viña del Mar.

The club was founded on 24 June 1909 after a group of Anglo-Chilean teenagers formed a football club and named it after the English team Everton who had recently completed a pioneering tour of South America. The club's nickname is "Ruleteros" or the roulette players in English, after Viña del Mar's status as a gambling resort.

Everton is Chile's sixth most successful team, having won the national title 4 times, an achievement shared with both Audax Italiano and Magallanes. Additionally, it is the second most successful team outside Santiago de Chile, behind Cobreloa of Calama.

The club's home stadium is the 22,340-capacity Sausalito Stadium, while its biggest rival is Santiago Wanderers of Valparaíso. In the meetings between the two clubs, Everton have won 64 to 50 losses.

== History ==
=== Foundation and Amateur Era ===
On 24 June 1909, a group of immigrants from England, led by David Foxley, founded Everton Football Club in Cerro Alegre of Valparaíso. The choice of this name is still to this day a mystery, although there are various competing theories. The most accepted theory is that this was chosen in honour of the namesake club in the city of Liverpool, which was, by then, touring Argentina. Another theory states the name of a toffee at the time. The first president was Francisco Boundy, while David Foxley was appointed honorary chairman. In 1950 the club was renamed Everton de Viña del Mar.

The first match played was against Graphie FC with the starting lineup composed of Arturo Foxley as the goalkeeper, Percy Holmes and Francisco Boundy as the defenders; Alberto González, Hugo Boundy and Carlos González as the midfielders and finally J. Escobar, A. Aravena, David Foxley, V. Estay and Malcolm Fraser as the strikers.

Originally the club was a compendium of different sports, the most important being track and field, human swimming, badminton, rugby, gymnastics, basketball and football.

Everton's first championship participation was the 1912 amateur championship of the Liga de Valparaíso.

=== The Golden age ===
The Everton squad of the club's first national championship in 1950.

Everton's first championship win was in 1950 under the Argentine coach Martín García. They defeated Unión Española 1–0 away in a play-off on 14 January 1951. The lone goal was scored by René Meléndez in the Estadio Nacional de Chile before 45,000 spectators.

In 1951, Everton finished fourth in the league, 5 points behind Audax Italiano. The following year, Everton clinched the Primera División with two weeks to spare, as Martín García's side beat Audax Italiano 4–0 at home win. In the championship-winning squad the most prominent players were José María Lourido, Elías Cid and René Meléndez, top-scorer of the tournament with 30 goals. During this period the club also won against important clubs of South America, the most recorded match was against the Argentine club Independiente of Avellaneda, in a 5–0 home win at Estadio El Tranque with 12,000 spectators.

The performance of the club began to decline, and apart from a third-place finish in 1955, Everton's highest finish for the remainder of the 1950s would be sixth position in the 12-team league.

=== 1970–present ===
After many years of revolving between the Primera División and the second tier, the club finally clinched their third Primera División championship in the 1976 Primera División under the guidance of manager Pedro Morales. They have won the second division championship on two occasions, the first in 1974 and most recently in 2003. The club has played in 2 Copa Libertadores tournaments, the first came in 1977 after their Primera División 1976 championship.

In the Torneo Apertura 2007, the club ended in 12th position, but in the Torneo Clausura the club made the worst campaign in its history, ending in last position (21st).

In the Torneo Apertura 2008, Everton was proclaimed champion of the tournament, with a 3–2 aggregate result against Colo-Colo in Sausalito Stadium. In the first leg, Everton lost 2–0 away at the Estadio Monumental David Arellano with goals by Lucas Barrios and Gonzalo Fierro, but in the second home leg at Sausalito Stadium, Everton won 3–0 with two goals by Ezequiel Miralles and one from Jaime Riveros. In thanks to that tournament win in 2009 Everton qualified for the Copa Libertadotes, for the second time in their history.

On 4 August 2010, at Goodison Park in Liverpool, England, Everton de Viña del Mar for the first time played their namesake club Everton, in a friendly match for the Copa Hermandad (known in English as the Brotherhood Trophy) aiming to promote closer ties between the two Evertons. The match was won 2–0 by the original Everton with goals from Jermaine Beckford and Diniyar Bilyaletdinov. That year, Everton de Viña were relegated to Primera B.

Two seasons later, Everton de Viña featured in the Primera B promotion play-off against Universidad de Concepción, winning the first (home) leg on 18 November 2012, 1–0, with a goal from Angel Rojas. In the away leg on 26 November 2012, two goals from José Luis Muñoz and one from Yonathan Suazo secured a 1–3 win and a return to the top flight of Chilean football in 2013.

== Rivalries ==
Everton's main rivals are Santiago Wanderers, from the nearby city of Valparaíso. Valparaíso is seen as a historical city with rich culture, home of worldwide known poet Pablo Neruda, whilst Viña del Mar is renowned for being a glamorous and luxurious place full of resorts. The local derby is dubbed the "Clásico Porteño" or "The Seaport Derby" in English.

== Stadium ==
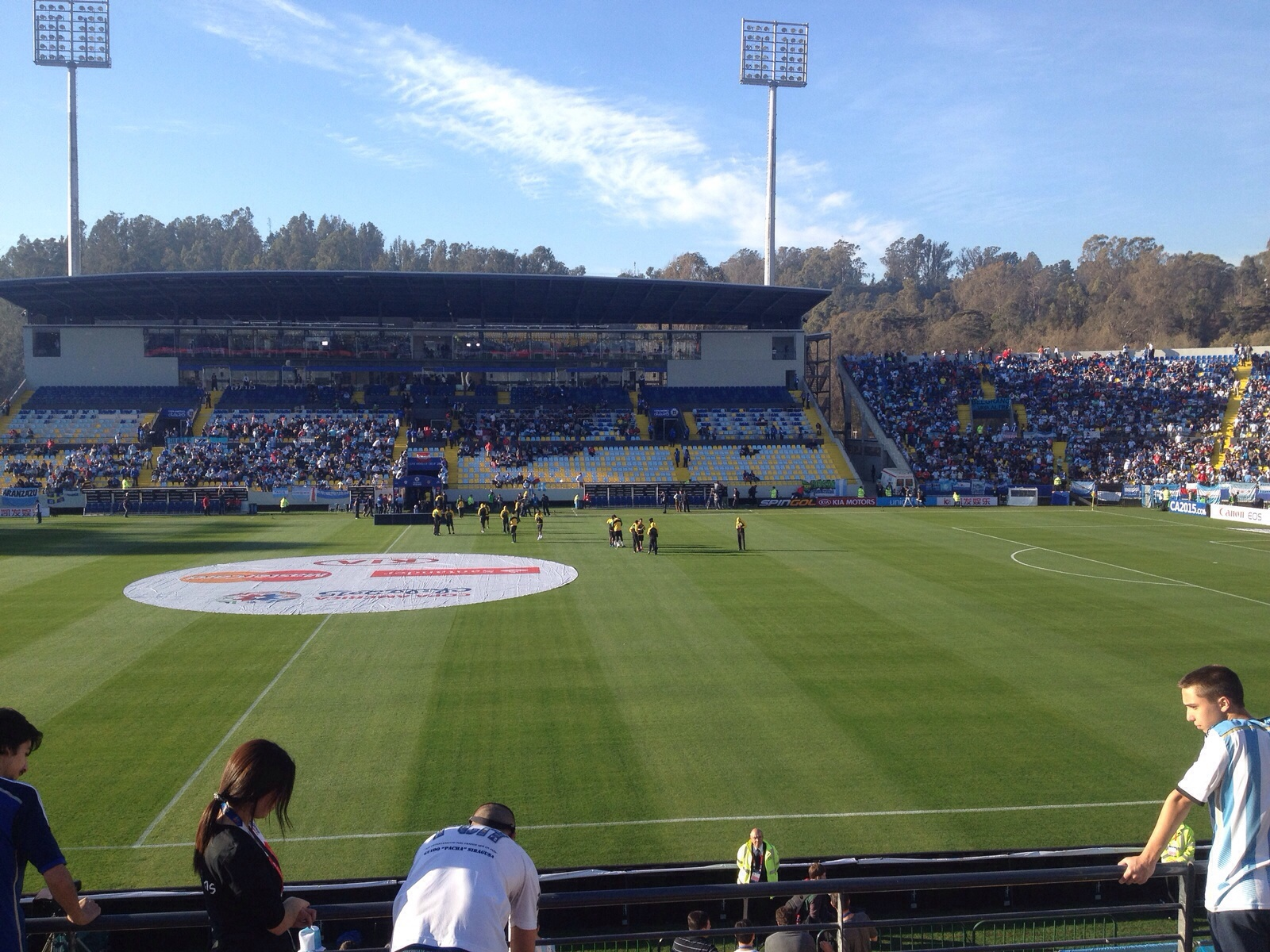
Sausalito Stadium, the home stadium of Everton

The club's home games are played at the Sausalito Stadium, which has a capacity of 22,340 seats being built in 1929. The name comes from the nearby Sausalito lagoon. The stadium was used as one of the venues for the 1962 FIFA World Cup. The stadium hosted the semi-final between Czechoslovakia and Yugoslavia. It was also one of four venues to host matches during the 1991 Copa América and 2015 Copa América.

== Honours ==
=== National ===
- Primera División
  - Winners (4): 1950, 1952, 1976, 2008 Apertura
- Copa Chile
  - Winners (1): 1984
- Primera B
  - Winners (1): 2003
- Apertura de Segunda División
  - Winners (1): 1982
- Primera B Clausura
  - Winners (1): 2011

=== Regional ===
- Liga de Valparaíso
  - Winners (2): 1928, 1931
- Sección Profesional de la Asociación de Viña del Mar
  - Winners (1): 1944

== Club facts ==
- 67 Seasons in Primera División
- 14 Seasons in Primera B
- 3 Participations in Copa Libertadores (1977, 2009, 2022)
- 3 Participations in Copa Sudamericana (2017, 2018, 2022)

== South American cups history ==
Season	Competition	Round	Country	Club	Home	Away	Aggregate
1977	Copa Libertadores	Group 4	(Chile)	Universidad de Chile	2–0	0–1	3rd Place
1977	Copa Libertadores	Group 4	(Paraguay)	Libertad	1–3	1–2	3rd Place
1977	Copa Libertadores	Group 4	(Paraguay)	Olimpia	1–0	2–2	3rd Place
2009	Copa Libertadores	Group 6	(Argentina)	Lanús	1–1	2–1	3rd Place
2009	Copa Libertadores	Group 6	(Mexico)	Guadalajara	1–1	2–6	3rd Place
2009	Copa Libertadores	Group 6	(Venezuela)	Caracas	1–0	0–1	3rd Place
2017	Copa Sudamericana	First Round	(Colombia)	Patriotas	1–0	0–1	2–2 3-4p
2018	Copa Sudamericana	First Round	(Venezuela)	Caracas	1–2	1–0	2–2 (a)

== Records ==
- Record Primera División victory — 7–0 v. Bádminton (1946) & Iberia (1954)
- Record Primera División defeat — 1–8 v. Universidad de Chile (1962) & Universidad Católica (1994)
- Record Copa Chile victory — 8–0 v. Selección Copiapó (1961)
- Record victory (overall) — 17–0 v. Santiago Wanderers (Campeonato de Apertura 1950)
- Most goals scored (Primera División matches) — 123, Daniel Escudero (1962–1966, 1968–1972)
- Highest home attendance — 30,002 v. Colo-Colo (3 October 1976) (at Sausalito Stadium)
- Primera División Best Position — Champions (1950, 1952, 1976, 2008 A)
- Copa Chile Best Season — Champions (1984)

== Other sports ==
Originally the club, was a compendium of various sport disciplines, emphasizing athletics, swimming, badminton, rugby, gymnastics and basketball, which gave way to football. In the 1920s, future President Salvador Allende was a member of the club and was particularly noted as a long jumper.

Everton also field a women's football team, which has won numerous national championships. They represented Chile at the inaugural Copa Libertadores de Fútbol Femenino in 2009, and also in 2010. In 2009, Everton finished in fourth place behind champions Santos of Brazil; in 2010 they advanced to the final, also against Santos, but lost 1–0.

== Brotherhood Cup ==
The Brotherhood Cup was a one-off match on 4 August 2010 at Goodison Park in Liverpool. Everton de Viña del Mar played their namesakes Everton in a friendly match for the Copa Hermandad (known in English as the Brotherhood Trophy). The match aimed at promoting closer ties between the two Evertons. Everton (ENG) won the game 2–0 with two second half goals from Jermaine Beckford and Diniyar Bilyaletdinov. Beckford won the man of the match award. And the trophy was held up by Phil Neville and Mikel Arteta. It was the first time the two teams had ever played each other.

4 August
20:00

Everton (England)	2–0	(Chile) Everton de Viña del Mar
Beckford 51'; Bilyaletdinov 65'	Match report

Goodison Park, Liverpool
Attendance: 25,934
Referee: Mark Halsey

== Joint Everton War Memorial ==
In June 2011 the Everton Shareholders' Association unveiled a joint war memorial at Goodison Park commemorating members of both clubs who gave their lives in the World Wars.

== Current squad ==
Current squad of Everton de Viña del Mar as of 27 July 2026 (edit)
Sources: ANFP Official Web Site

No.		Position	Player
1	CHI	GK	Ignacio González
2	CHI	DF	Óscar Opazo
3	CHI	DF	Pablo Martínez
4	URU	DF	Hugo Magallanes
5	ARG	DF	Ramiro González
6	COL	MF	Gustavo Charrupí (loan from Atlético Bucaramanga)
7	CHI	MF	Joaquín Moya
8	CHI	MF	Lucas Soto (loan from Colo-Colo)
9	CHI	FW	Julián Alfaro (loan from Universidad de Chile)
10	URU	MF	Alan Medina
11	CHI	FW	Emiliano Ramos
12	CHI	GK	Isaac Esquenazi
14	CHI	DF	Nicolás Baeza
15	CHI	DF	Vicente Fernández
16	CHI	MF	Ricardo Rebolledo

No.		Position	Player
17	CHI	DF	Cristopher Barrera
19	CHI	DF	Vicente Vega
20	CHI	FW	Josué Ovalle
21	CHI	MF	Benjamín Berríos
23	CHI	MF	Martín Guzmán
24	CHI	DF	Diego Oyarzún (c)
25	CHI	GK	Esteban Kirkman
26	CHI	FW	José Tomás Hernández
27	CHI	FW	Santiago Reinoso
28	CHI	MF	Amaro León
29	ARG	FW	Braian Martínez (loan from Independiente)
30	URU	FW	Cristian Palacios
32	CHI	FW	Félix Barrera
34	CHI	GK	Excequiel Bustamante
37	CHI	DF	Valentín Vidal (loan from Unión Española)
40	ARG	FW	Nicolás Montiel (loan from Ferro Carril Oeste)

Manager: Walter Ribonetto

=== 2026 Winter Transfers ===
==== In ====
Note: Flags indicate national team as defined under FIFA eligibility rules; some limited exceptions apply. Players may hold more than one non-FIFA nationality.

No.	Pos.	Nation	Player
6	MF	COL	Gustavo Charrupí (loan from Atlético Bucaramanga)
13	FW	COL	Andrés Arroyo (loan from Fortaleza)

No.	Pos.	Nation	Player
20	FW	CHI	Josué Ovalle (from Deportes Limache)

==== Out ====
Note: Flags indicate national team as defined under FIFA eligibility rules; some limited exceptions apply. Players may hold more than one non-FIFA nationality.

No.	Pos.	Nation	Player
8	MF	MEX	Dieter Villalpando (back to Juárez)
13	FW	COL	Andrés Arroyo (to Pachuca)
18	FW	CHI	Cristóbal Chadwick (loan to Unión Española)
20	MF	CHI	Felipe Villagrán (to Cobreloa)

No.	Pos.	Nation	Player
22	FW	COL	Santiago Londoño (to León)
33	FW	URU	Sebastián Sosa (released)
36	DF	CHI	Byron Navarro (loan to Concón National)

== Notable players ==
- (Argentina) (Chile) Maximiliano Cerato
- (Argentina) (Chile) Gustavo Dalsasso
- (Argentina) Ezequiel Miralles
- (Argentina) José Daniel Ponce
- (Argentina) Matías Urbano
- (Chile) Pablo Yoma
- (Argentina) Rafael Viotti
- (Bolivia) Ramiro Castillo
- (Bolivia) Milton Melgar
- (Brazil) Rubens Nicola
- (Chile) Sergio Ahumada
- (Chile) Mario Barreto
- (Chile) Ivo Basay
- (Chile) Mario Cáceres
- (Chile) Alejandro Carrasco
- (Chile) Cristián Castañeda
- (Chile) Roberto Elías Cid
- (Chile) Marco Cornez
- (Chile) Juan Covarrubias
- (Chile) Mauricio Donoso
- (Chile) Marco Estrada
- (Chile) Mario Galindo
- (Chile) Johnny Herrera
- (Chile) Belisario Leiva
- (Chile) René Meléndez
- (Chile) Manuel Neira
- (Chile) Álvaro Ormeño
- (Chile) René Piérola
- (Chile) Renato Ramos
- (Chile) Jaime Riveros
- (Chile) Eladio Rojas
- (Chile) César Santis
- (Chile) (Argentina) Jorge Spedaletti
- (Chile) Carlos Toro
- (Chile) Casimiro Torres
- (Chile) Cristián Uribe
- (Chile) Oscar Wirth
- (Colombia) Luis Alberto Perea
- (Paraguay) Pablo Caballero
- (Paraguay) Marco Lazaga
- (Uruguay) (Chile) Nelson Acosta
- (Uruguay) Jorge Delgado
- (Uruguay) Carlos María Morales
- (Uruguay) Braian Rodríguez
- (Australia) Noah Phelan (Academy)

== Managers ==
- (Uruguay) Pedro Duhart (1944)
- (Uruguay) Luis Gianelli (1944)
- (Argentina) José Vilariño (1944)
- (Chile) Casimiro Torres (1944)
- (Chile) Cirilo Costagliola (1944)
- (Argentina) José Vilariño (1945)
- (Argentina) José Della Torre (1945–1946)
- (Chile) Renato Panay (1947)
- (Argentina) (Italy) Raimundo Orsi (1947)
- (Argentina) Martín García (1948–1954)
- (Czechoslovakia) Carlos Snopek (1955–1956)
- (Argentina) Carlos Aldabe (1957–1958)
- (Argentina) Salvador Biondi (1959–1963)
- (Chile) Daniel Torres (1964–1966)
- (Argentina) José María Lourido (1966)
- (Paraguay) Ovidio Casartelli (1967)
- (Uruguay) Adolfo Rodríguez (1967)
- (Chile) Guillermo Díaz (1968)
- (Argentina) José María Lourido (1968–1969)
- (Chile) Raúl Pino (1969-1971)
- (Argentina) José María Lourido (1972)
- (Chile) Daniel Torres (1972–1973)
- (Argentina) Ángel Saldamando (1973)
- (Argentina) José Pérez (1973)
- (Chile) Ramón Climent (1973–1975)
- (Argentina) Martin García (1975)
- (Chile) Pedro Morales (1976–1978)
- (Chile) Rosamel Miranda (1979)
- (Chile) Ricardo Contreras (1979)
- (Chile) Hugo Tassara (1980)
- (Chile) Rodolfo Leal (1980)
- (Chile) Caupolicán Peña (1980–1981)
- (Argentina) José María Lourido (1981)
- (Chile) Eladio Rojas (1981)
- (Chile) (Spain) Francisco Molina (1981)
- (Chile) Ricardo Contreras (1981–1983)
- (Chile) Fernando Riera (1983–1984)
- (Chile) Rodolfo Leal (1985)
- (Chile) Armando Tobar (1985–1986)
- (Chile) Orlando Aravena (1986)
- (Chile) Alberto Quintano (1986)
- (Uruguay) (Chile) Alberto Ferrero (1987)
- (Chile) Gustavo Cortés (1987–1989)
- (Argentina) Rogelio Domínguez (1989)
- (Argentina) (Chile) Miguel Ángel Leyes (1990)
- (Chile) Armando Tobar (1991)
- (Chile) Eduardo de la Barra (1992)
- (Chile) Luis Santibáñez (1992)
- (Chile) Jorge Garcés (1993)
- (Chile) Antonio Vargas (1993)
- (Chile) Domingo Sorace (1994–1995)
- (Chile) Julio Núñez (1995)
- (Chile) Leonardo Véliz (1996–1997)
- (Uruguay) Gerardo Pelusso (1998)
- (Chile) Manuel Rodríguez (1998)
- (Uruguay) Jorge Luis Siviero (1999)
- (Chile) Jorge Aravena (2000)
- (Chile) Jaime Baeza (2001)
- (Chile) Jorge García (2001–2002)
- (Uruguay) Jorge Luis Siviero (2002)
- (Chile) Miguel Ángel Arrué (2002)
- (Chile) Hernán Ibarra (2003)
- (Chile) Jorge Socías (2003–2004)
- (Chile) Jorge Garcés (2004–2005)
- (Argentina) Marcelo Espina (2006)
- (Chile) Jorge García (2006)
- (Chile) Juvenal Olmos (2007)
- (Uruguay) (Chile) Nelson Acosta (2007–2010)
- (Argentina) Diego Osella (2010–2011)
- (Chile) Marco Antonio Figueroa (2011–2012)
- (Chile) Víctor Hugo Castañeda (2012–2013)
- (Argentina) Omar Labruna (2013–2014)
- (Uruguay) (Chile) Nelson Acosta (2014)
- (Chile) Luis Marcoleta (2014)
- (Chile) Carlos Medina (2014)
- (Chile) Víctor Rivero (2015–2016)
- (Chile) Cristián Uribe (2016)
- (Chile) Héctor Tapia (2016)
- (Argentina) Pablo Sánchez (2016–2018)
- (Argentina) Javier Torrente (2018)
- (Uruguay) Gustavo Díaz (2019)
- (Argentina) Javier Torrente (2019–2020)
- (Argentina) Roberto Sensini (2020–2021)
- (Argentina) Francisco Meneghini (2022-2024)
- (Chile) Davis González (2024)
- (Argentina) Esteban Solari (2024)
- (Brazil) Gustavo Leal (2025)
- (Argentina) (Chile) Gustavo Dalsasso (2025)
- (Uruguay) Mauricio Larriera (2025-Act.)
