= Santiago Wanderers =

Association football Chilean club

- Full name: Club de Deportes Santiago Wanderers
- Nicknames: Caturros (Cockatiels); El vagabundo (Harbour Men); Decano (Dean); La verde (The green)
- Founded: 15 August 1892
- Ground: Estadio Elías Figueroa Brander; Valparaíso, Chile
- Capacity: 20,575
- Chairman: Luis Sánchez
- Manager: Héctor Robles
- League: Primera B
- 2025: Primera B, 8th of 16
- Website: www.santiagowanderers.cl
Home colours	Away colours	Third colours

Club de Deportes Santiago Wanderers is a football club based in Valparaíso, Chile, which currently competes in the Chilean Primera División. Wanderers have played their home matches at Estadio Elías Figueroa Brander since 1931. The stadium has a capacity of 20,000.

Founded in 1892, it is the oldest football club in Chile and one of the oldest in the Americas. For this reason, Wanderers are known in Chile as the Decano del fútbol chileno ("Dean of Chilean football") and are part of CONMEBOL's Club de los 100, which brings together Latin American clubs founded more than 100 years ago. In 2007, the club was recognised as part of Valparaíso's intangible heritage. The club's traditional home colours are green shirts and socks with white shorts, inspired by the colours of the Irish national football team.

Wanderers have a fierce rivalry with neighbouring Everton of Viña del Mar, with the two clubs contesting the Clásico Porteño (Seaport Derby), the oldest football derby in Chile, first played in 1916. Wanderers have historically been associated with the working class, whereas Everton have traditionally been associated with the wealthier tourist and seaside areas of neighbouring Viña del Mar.

During its early history, the club competed in the local Liga Valparaíso championship in the Valparaíso Region, winning seven titles. In 1926, Chile's football associations were unified, after which Valparaíso declined in importance as an administrative centre of Chilean football. Following this period, Wanderers joined the professional football association in 1944 and subsequently won three Chilean league titles, in 1958, 1968 and 2001.

Wanderers have produced prominent players in the history of Chilean football, including Elías Figueroa, widely regarded as one of Chile's greatest footballers and one of the greatest defenders in the history of the sport, alongside figures such as Franz Beckenbauer. Other notable Chilean players developed by Wanderers include Moisés Villarroel, Reinaldo Navia, David Pizarro and Eugenio Mena; the latter two were members of the Chilean squad that won the 2015 Copa América.

== History ==
=== Beginnings ===
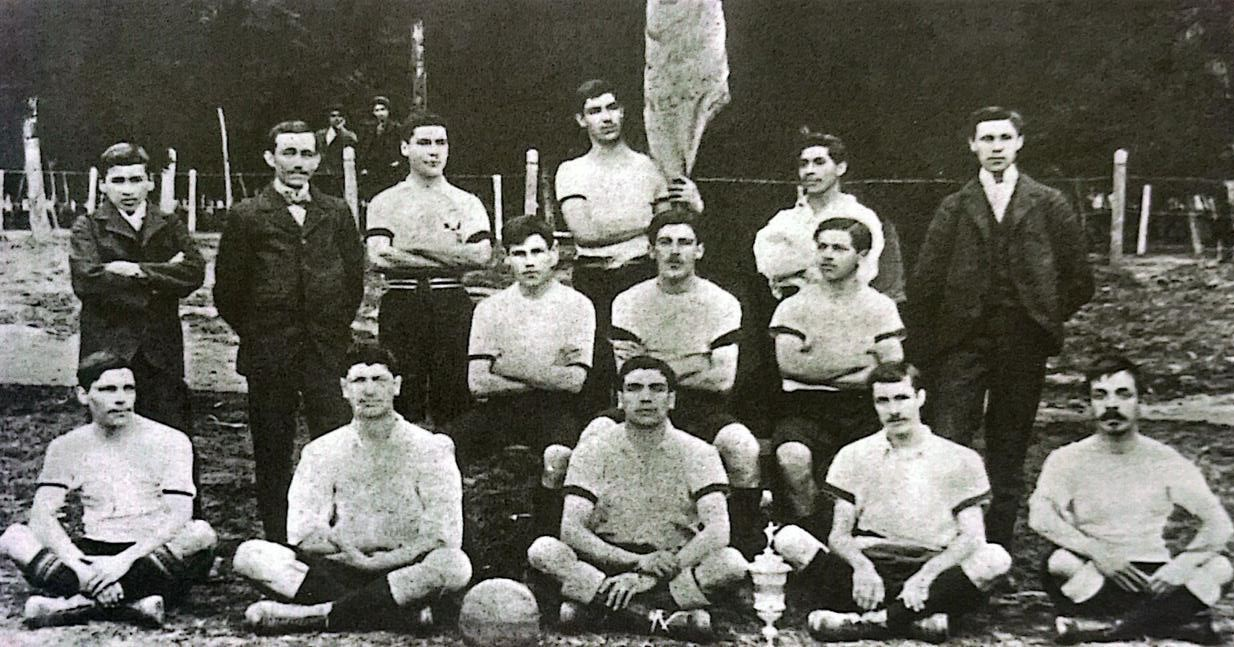
Wanderers in 1901.

Santiago Wanderers was officially established on 15 August 1892 in the port district of Barrio Puerto in Valparaíso. Due to the existence of another team named Valparaíso Wanderers, the club's founders adopted the name Santiago to distinguish it from the already established side.

The club remained at amateur level until 1936, before officially joining the professional league competition in 1937, four years after the Chilean Football Federation began organising championships across the central and southern zones of Chile.

In their first professional season, Wanderers finished bottom of the table – in seventh place – without earning a point, prompting the club to leave the Asociación de Fútbol de Santiago (the federation's official governing body responsible for organising the professional football tournament; the predecessor of the current ANFP) and return to the local football association. In 1944, however, Wanderers rejoined the professional league on a permanent basis and went on to produce consistent performances and campaigns throughout the late 1940s and early 1950s.

=== Success amid instability: 1955–2001 ===
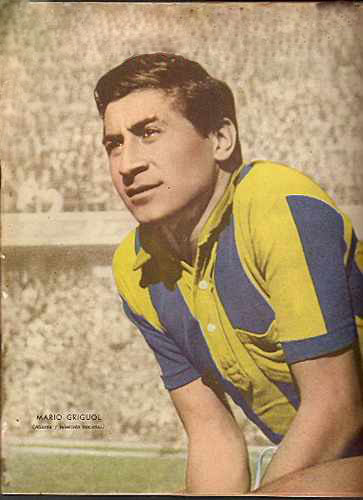
Mario Griguol, top-scorer from 1968's champion team with 16 goals.

Wanderers' first successful era began with the appointment of José Pérez as manager in 1955. In 1958, his third season in charge, the club won its first league title, followed in 1959 by its first Copa Chile, defeating Deportes La Serena 5–1 in the final. In 1961, Wanderers once again won the Cup, defeating Universidad Católica on aggregate. During the remainder of the 1960s, the club recorded fifth- and eighth-place finishes in subsequent seasons before winning its second league title in 1968. This period also saw the emergence of promising players such as central defender Elías Figueroa.

This success, however, did not continue into the 1970s. José Pérez left the club and Wanderers were relegated to the second division in 1977, following internal turmoil within the club's board and a series of poor campaigns on the field. The club achieved promotion at the first attempt by winning the Second Division championship, finishing two points clear of Naval of Talcahuano. After returning to the top flight, however, Wanderers struggled for consistency, generally finishing in mid-table while also enduring several campaigns near the bottom of the standings.

Wanderers were eventually relegated for the third time in 1984 and did not return to Primera until 1989, after defeating Unión San Felipe 4–1 in the promotion playoffs. In the 1991 season, Wanderers were relegated once again to the second division and celebrated their 100th anniversary in the country's second tier, avoiding further relegation by only five points. After four seasons in the second division, Wanderers finally achieved promotion to Primera in 1995, defeating Audax Italiano 4–1 on aggregate over two legs after the clubs had finished level on 52 points following 30 rounds.

Following their return to the first division, Wanderers struggled for consistency during the 1996 season, although forward Mario Vener became the first player in the club's history to top the league's goalscoring charts, scoring 30 goals. By 1998, the club had made several notable signings, including Claudio Borghi and Marcelo Vega, alongside emerging youngsters such as David Pizarro and Reinaldo Navia. Nevertheless, Wanderers were relegated again after finishing second-last, in 15th place, under manager Pedro García. During the 1999 season, with the club in mid-table under Guillermo Páez, Jorge Garcés was appointed manager and ultimately secured promotion in the final round following a 1–1 draw with Deportes Ovalle.

In 2000, Wanderers finished ninth in a promising first season back in the top flight under Garcés, while a 1–1 draw on the final day contributed to the relegation of arch-rivals Everton. The subsequent signings of Uruguayan forward Silvio Fernández and midfielder Arturo Sanhueza strengthened the squad ahead of the 2001 season. Garcés led Wanderers to the top of the league table after four rounds, and the club emerged as one of the championship's leading sides, suffering only one setback—a draw against Rangers in round 20—during a decisive stretch of the campaign.

In the following week's Round 21 match, Wanderers defeated Universidad de Chile in a result that sparked a remarkable run of ten consecutive victories through to the final round of the season. The club clinched the league title on the final matchday with a 4–2 victory over Audax Italiano at the Estadio Nacional in Santiago. Around 50,000 supporters travelled from Valparaíso for the match, which secured Wanderers' first league championship in thirty-three years.

=== 21st century ===
Following a series of average performances since 2002, in 2007, the club was relegated to Primera B after finishing in the penultimate position in the league table. However, two seasons later, in 2009, Wanderers returned to the top flight after defeating San Luis Quillota in the two-legged promotion playoffs. After finishing in mid-table during the 2010 season, the team subsequently secured its top-flight status against Naval in 2011.

In 2012, Wanderers celebrated the 120th anniversary of their foundation. That year, the club competed in its third consecutive season in the top flight of Chilean football.

In 2014, Wanderers enjoyed an impressive campaign in the Torneo Clausura, finishing as runners-up behind Universidad de Chile. The club subsequently qualified for international competition following a twelve-year absence, earning a place in the 2015 Copa Sudamericana, despite losing 6–1 at home to Palestino in the second leg of the final qualification playoff.

In 2017, the club won its third Copa Chile title after defeating Universidad de Chile in the final at Estadio Ester Roa Rebolledo in Concepción.

== Colours ==
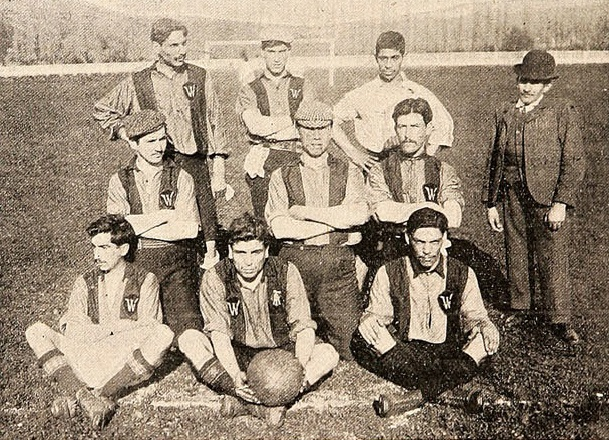
Wanderers team in 1905

In its early years, Wanderers were primarily identified with white, with the initials "SW" displayed in black on the shirts. The uniforms were handmade, often by the players' wives, which resulted in noticeable variations between individual kits.

In 1907, the club added a black diagonal band to its traditional white shirt, although differences between the players' uniforms remained. This continued until James McLean, an Englishman who had moved to Valparaíso several years earlier, proposed importing uniforms from England, where kits were already being manufactured specifically for football teams.

Upon McLean's return to Valparaíso, Wanderers received twenty green shirts and twenty pairs of white shorts, as well as a black uniform for the goalkeeper. According to the traditional account of the change, McLean, who was of Irish origin, chose the colours of the Irish Football Association team. Wanderers first wore the new kit on 18 September 1908.

Since then, green has remained the club's traditional home colour, with only occasional variations. Among these was a white shirt with thin green stripes worn during the late 1960s and again in 2001, when Wanderers won their third league title.

In 2007, the club introduced a kit similar to those worn in 1965 and 1966 to commemorate the institution's 115th anniversary.

=== Kit manufacturers & shirt sponsors ===
Period	Kit manufacturer	Shirt sponsor
1892–1975	None	None
1976–1980	None	Costa
1983	Haddad	La Estrella de Valparaíso
1988	Le Coq Sportif	Óptica Naranjo Internacional New York
1989	Adidas	Pilsener Dorada
1990–1992	Adidas	ENAP
1993–1994	Avia	Cristal
1995–1997	Uhlsport	Cristal
1998	Avia	Cristal
1999	Sauro	Cristal
1999–2000	Avia	Cristal
2001	Corre Corre	None
2001–2002	Wanderers Sport	Metalpar
2003	Adidas	None
2004	Training	Promepart
2005	Lotto	Pullman Bus
2006–2008	Training	None TPS
2009–2015	Mitre	TPS
2016–2024	Macron	TPS TCL ibet
2025-	KS7	TPS

=== Rivalries ===
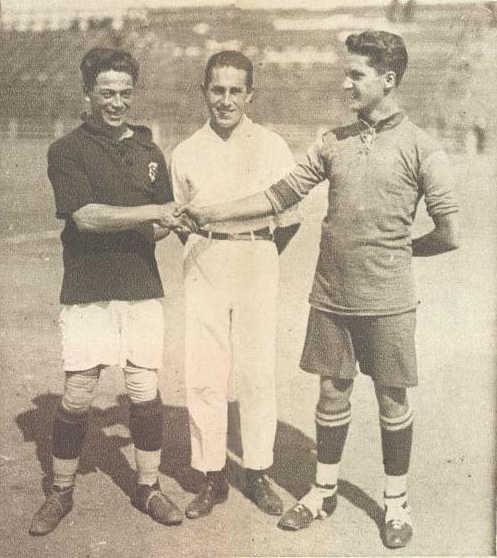
Wanderers and Everton in 1925.

Santiago Wanderers' traditional rivals are Everton de Viña del Mar and both teams dispute the Clásico Porteño. Although the first games between both date back to the 1910s, in that era the rival was La Cruz Football Club from Valparaíso too. The rivalry with Everton began to take shape towards the mid-1930s and was intensified with the relocation of that club to Viña del Mar.

During the amateurism era Wanderers dominated the head-to-head record against Everton, but today the club has not been able to reverse that difference in the professional era, which explains the current historical disadvantage (only overcome in the early 1970s). Both have faced off 157 times, of which 43 have been draws, 65 have been victories for Everton and 49 for Wanderers, whilst for top-tier, the greens have won 34 times, Everton have won on 39 occasions and registering 30 draws.

The first professional match between Wanderers and Everton took place on 9 July 1944 with a 2–0 win for the Viña del Mar side.

=== Stadium ===
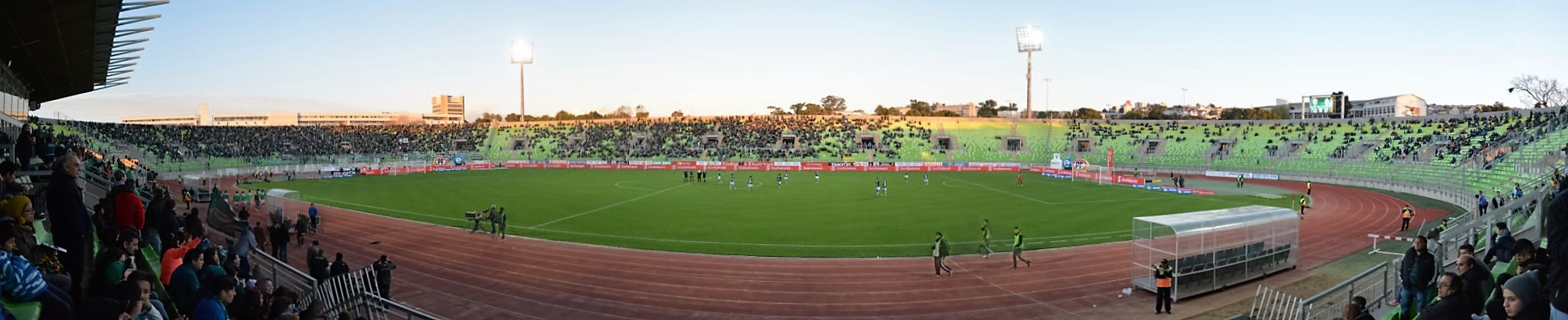
A panorama of Estadio Elías Figueroa Brander

== Players ==
=== Current squad ===
Current squad of Santiago Wanderers as of 8 August 2026 (edit)
Sources: ANFP Official Web Site

No.		Position	Player
1	CHI	GK	Eduardo Miranda
2	CHI	DF	Amaro Silva
3	CHI	DF	Luis Margas
4	CHI	DF	Víctor Espinoza
5	ARG	MF	Leandro Navarro
7	CHI	DF	Axel Herrera
8	CHI	MF	Joaquín Silva
9	URU	FW	Marcos Camarda
10	ARG	MF	Jorge Luna (c)
12	CHI	GK	Raúl Olivares
13	CHI	DF	Benjamín Adasme
14	CHI	FW	Cristóbal Ponce
15	CHI	MF	Martín Villarroel
16	CHI	DF	Pedro Navarro (loan from Colo-Colo)
17	CHI	MF	Cristóbal Cáceres
18	URU	DF	Sergio Felipe
19	CHI	MF	Cristóbal Villarroel

No.		Position	Player
20	CHI	FW	Lucas Avendaño
21	CHI	MF	Sebastián Vargas
22	CHI	FW	Javier Parraguez
23	CHI	FW	Ignacio Flores
24	CHI	DF	Alexander Dubó
25	CHI	GK	Felipe Terrazas
27	CHI	FW	Vicente Vera
28	CHI	MF	Diego Molina
29	CHI	FW	Christian Silva
31	CHI	MF	Christopher Valenzuela
32	CHI	FW	Vicente Vargas
33	CHI	DF	Taizo Bahamondez
35	CHI	GK	Fabiano Avello
36	CHI	GK	Bayron Martínez
37	CHI	FW	Denilson San Martín
38	CHI	MF	Dylan Portilla (loan from Colo-Colo)

Manager: Francisco Palladino

=== 2025 transfers ===
==== In ====
Note: Flags indicate national team as defined under FIFA eligibility rules; some limited exceptions apply. Players may hold more than one non-FIFA nationality.

No.	Pos.	Nation	Player
12	GK	CHI	Bayron Martínez (from Concón National Loan return)
25	GK	CHI	Vicente Lagos (from Provincial Osorno Loan return)

No.	Pos.	Nation	Player
23	DF	CHI	Víctor González (from Deportes Temuco Free transfer)
30	MF	CHI	Ethan Espinoza (from Deportes La Serena Free transfer)
16	MF	CHI	Ricardo Parra (from Concón National Loan return)
9	FW	CHI	Josepablo Monreal (from Chungnam Asan Free transfer)
26	FW	CHI	Camilo Astroza (from Concón National Loan return)
27	FW	ARG	Maximiliano Cuadra (from Magallanes Free transfer)
18	DF	URU	Sergio Felipe (from Rangers de Talca Free transfer)
22	DF	CHI	John Salas (from Curicó Unido Free transfer)
13	DF	CHI	Franco Cubillos (from Concón National)
17	DF	CHI	Axel Herrera (from Unión San Felipe Loan return)
5	MF	ARG	Leandro Navarro (No club - Free agent)
10	MF	ARG	Jorge Luna (from Deportes Copiapó Free transfer)

==== Out ====
Note: Flags indicate national team as defined under FIFA eligibility rules; some limited exceptions apply. Players may hold more than one non-FIFA nationality.

No.	Pos.	Nation	Player
—	GK	CHI	Fernando Hurtado (to Deportes Antofagasta Free transfer)
—	DF	CHI	Jason León (to Palestino Free transfer)
—	DF	CHI	Enzo Ormeño (to Santiago Morning Free transfer)

No.	Pos.	Nation	Player
—	DF	URU	Andrés Barboza (to Fénix Free transfer)
—	DF	PAR	Danilo Ortíz (to Cienciano)
—	DF	CHI	Kevin Vásquez (to Santiago Morning Free transfer)
—	MF	ARG	Marcelo Cañete (No club)
—	MF	CHI	Brayan Garrido (to Huachipato Free transfer)
—	MF	CHI	César Valenzuela (to Magallanes)
—	FW	CHI	Carlos Muñoz (to Magallanes Free transfer)

=== Supporters ===
The club's supporters are known as Porteños or Wanderinos. Wanderers principal fan group are The Panzers, whose politics tend to be left-wing.

=== Anthem ===
Based in the rhythm of English march Captain Craddock, the most commonly accepted and widespread version is that this dates back to 1912 and would be work from the performer and composer Efrain Arévalo López, who would have donated the composition in a gesture of thanks to the club's board, for the joys lived with the team.

== Managers ==
- (Argentina) José Luis Boffi (1934)
- (Uruguay) Pedro Mazullo (1935–36)
- (Chile) Ramón Opazo (1937)
- (Spain) (Argentina) Fermín Lecea (1943–45)
- (Uruguay) Pedro Duhart (1946)
- (Hungary) Francisco Platko (1948)
- (Argentina) José Pérez (1949–50)
- (Hungary) Francisco Platko (1951–52)
- (Chile) Héctor Velasco (1952–53)
- (Czech Republic) Carlos Sponeck (1954)
- (Argentina) José Pérez (1955–61)
- (Chile) Sergio Cruzat (1962)
- (Argentina) Donato Hernández (1963)
- (Argentina) Martín García (1964–65)
- (Argentina) Donato Hernández (1966)
- (Chile) Guillermo Díaz (1967)
- (Argentina) José Pérez (1968)
- (Argentina) Donato Hernández (1969)
- (Chile) Jorge Luco (1970–71)
- (Chile) Jorge Vásquez (1971)
- (Chile) Luis Álamos (1971)
- (Chile) Francisco Hormazábal (1972)
- (Chile) Hernán Gárate (1972)
- (Chile) Washington Urrutia (1973)
- (Chile) Hernán Gárate (1973–74)
- (Argentina) Donato Hernández (1974)
- (Uruguay) Adolfo Rodríguez (1974)
- (Argentina) José Pérez (1975–76)
- (Chile) Ricardo Contreras (1976)
- (Argentina) Alfredo Rojas (1977)
- (Argentina) José Pérez (1977)
- (Chile) Guillermo Díaz (1978–79)
- (Argentina) Donato Hernández (1979)
- (Chile) Luis Álamos (1979-1980)
- (Chile) Jorge Luco (1980)
- (Chile) Jorge Toro (1980)
- (Chile) Dante Pesce (1981)
- (Chile) Armando Tobar (1981)
- (Chile) Jorge Venegas (1981–82)
- (Chile) Guillermo Díaz (1982)
- (Chile) Juan Rodríguez Vega (1982)
- (Chile) Pedro Morales (1983)
- (Chile) Luis Ibarra (1983)
- (Chile) Guillermo Díaz (1984–86)
- (Chile) Luis Parraguez (1987)
- (Uruguay) (Chile) Alberto Ferrero (1988)
- (Chile) Hernán Godoy (1988)
- (Chile) Isaac Carrasco (1989–90)
- (Chile) Luis Santibáñez (1990)
- (Argentina) Oscar Blanco (1991)
- (Chile) Hernán Godoy (1991)
- (Chile) Armando Tobar (1992)
- (Chile) Isaac Carrasco+ (Argentina) Roque Mercury (1992)
- (Chile) Elías Figueroa (1993)
- (Chile) Raúl Aravena (1994)
- (Uruguay) Jorge Luis Siviero (1994–97)
- (Chile) Jorge Socías (1997)
- (Chile) Leonardo Véliz (1998)
- (Chile) Pedro García (1998)
- (Chile) Guillermo Páez (1999)
- (Chile) Juan Rivero (1999)
- (Chile) Jorge Garcés (1999–2001)
- (Argentina) Ricardo Dabrowski (2002)
- (Chile) Yuri Fernández (2003–04)
- (Chile) Raúl Aravena (2004)
- (Chile) Carlos González (2005)
- (Chile) Mario Soto (2005–06)
- (Chile) Hernán Godoy (2006–07)
- (Chile) Raúl Aravena (2007)
- (Chile) Yuri Fernández (2007)
- (Chile) Héctor Robles (2007)
- (Chile) Gustavo Huerta (2008)
- (Chile) Jorge Aravena (2008–09)
- (Argentina) Humberto Zuccarelli (2009–10)
- (Chile) Jorge Garcés (2010)
- (Argentina) Juan Manuel Llop (2011)
- (Chile) Héctor Robles (2011)
- (Chile) Arturo Salah (2012)
- (Chile) Héctor Robles (2012)
- (Chile) Ivo Basay (2012–14)
- (Chile) Héctor Robles (2014)
- (Chile) Emiliano Astorga (2014–15)
- (Uruguay) Alfredo Arias (2016)
- (Uruguay) Eduardo Espinel (2016–17)
- (Uruguay) Silvio Fernández (2017)
- (Chile) Nicolás Córdova (2017–18)
- (Chile) Moisés Villarroel (2018)
- (Chile) Miguel Ramírez (2018–21)
- (Chile) Ronald Fuentes (2021)
- (Chile) Víctor Rivero (2021)
- (Chile) Moisés Villarroel (2021)
- (Chile) Emiliano Astorga (2021)
- (Chile) Moisés Villarroel (2021)
- (Chile) Domingo Sorace (2021)
- (Chile) Jorge Garcés (2021–22)
- (Chile) Jhon Valladares (2022)
- (Chile) Miguel Ponce (2022)
- (Uruguay) Francisco Palladino (2023–24)
- (Chile) Domingo Sorace (2024)
- (Chile) Jaime García (2024)
- (Chile) Héctor Robles (2024–25)
- (Chile) Domingo Sorace (2025)
- (Uruguay) Francisco Palladino (2026–Present)

== Honours ==
=== National ===
- Primera División
  - Champions (3): 1958, 1968, 2001
- Copa Chile
  - Champions (3): 1959, 1961, 2017
- Primera B
  - Champions (3): 1978, 1995, 2019

=== Regional ===
- Football Association of Chile/Liga de Valparaíso
  - Champions (10): 1907, 1909, 1913, 1915, 1917, 1919, 1921, 1933, 1934, 1935
- Copa Sporting
  - Champions (4): 1907, 1913, 1915, 1916
- National Football Association
  - Champions (1): 1897
- Challenger Football Association
  - Champions (1): 1899
- Olimpiadas Nacionales
  - Champions (1): 1909
- Asociación Porteña de Fútbol
  - Champions (2): 1941, 1942

=== Youth team ===
==== International ====
- U-20 Copa Libertadores
  - Champions (1): 2026

== South American continental cup history ==
Season	Competition	Round	Country	Club	Home	Away	Aggregate
1969	Copa Libertadores	Group 2	(Chile)	Universidad Católica	2–3	3–1	2nd Place
1969	Copa Libertadores	Group 2	(Peru)	Sporting Cristal	2–0; 1–1	1–2	2nd Place
1969	Copa Libertadores	Group 2	(Peru)	Juan Aurich	4–1	1–3; 1–0	2nd Place
1969	Copa Libertadores	Second Stage	(Uruguay)	Nacional	1–1	0–2	3rd Place
1969	Copa Libertadores	Second Stage	(Colombia)	Deportivo Cali	3–3	1–5	3rd Place
2002	Copa Libertadores	Group 6	(Argentina)	Boca Juniors	1–0	0–0	3rd Place
2002	Copa Libertadores	Group 6	(Uruguay)	Montevideo Wanderers	1–1	1–3	3rd Place
2002	Copa Libertadores	Group 6	(Ecuador)	Emelec	2–1	1–1	3rd Place
2002	Copa Sudamericana	Second Round	(Chile)	Cobreloa	3–2	1–0	4–2
2002	Copa Sudamericana	Quarterfinals	(Colombia)	Santa Fe	1–0	1–2	2–2 5-6p
2004	Copa Sudamericana	Preliminary Round	(Chile)	Universidad de Concepción	0–1	1–2	2–3
2015	Copa Sudamericana	First Round	(Paraguay)	Libertad	0–0	1–2	1–2
2018	Copa Libertadores	Second Prel. Round	(Peru)	Melgar	1–1	1–0	2–1
2018	Copa Libertadores	Third Prel. Round	(Colombia)	Santa Fe	1–2	0–3	1–5

== Records ==
=== Seasons and participations ===
- 12 seasons in Football Association of Chile (FAC) 1900-11
- 19 seasons in Liga Atlética y de Football de Valparaíso (1912) and Liga Valparaíso (1030) 1912-35
- 1 season in Asociación de Football Profesional de Santiago 1937
- 4 season in Asociación Porteña de Fútbol Profesional| 1940-43
- 60 seasons in Primera División 1944–77, 1979, 1980, 1983, 1984, 1990, 1991, 1996–98, 2000–07, 2010–2017, 2020-
- 17 seasons in Primera B 1978, 1981, 1982, 1985–89, 1992–95, 1999, 2008–09, 2018–2019
- 3 Participations in Copa Libertadores 1969, 2002, 2018
- 3 Participations in Copa Sudamericana 2002, 2004, 2015

== Results and players achievements ==
- Record Primera División victory: 7–0 v. Everton (1949) & v. Universidad Católica (1954).
- Record Copa Chile victory: 7–2 v. San Luis (2014)
- Record Primera División defeat: 1–7 Audax Italiano (2007)
- Most goals scored (Primera División matches) — 84, Juan Álvarez
- Most goals scored in a Primera División league — 30, Mario Véner (1996).
- Highest home attendance — 30,099 v. Colo-Colo (30 August 1964) (at Estadio Sausalito)
- Football Association of Chile (FAC) Best Position — Champions (1907, 1909)
- Liga Atlética y de Football de Valparaíso and Liga Valparaíso Best Position — Champions (1913, 1915, 1917, 1919, 1921, 1933, 1934, 1935)
- Primera División Best Position — Champions (1958, 1968, 2001)
- Copa Chile Best Season — Champions (1959, 1961, 2017)

== See also ==
- Valparaíso
