= Cristian Saavedra =

Chilean footballer and manager (born 1961)

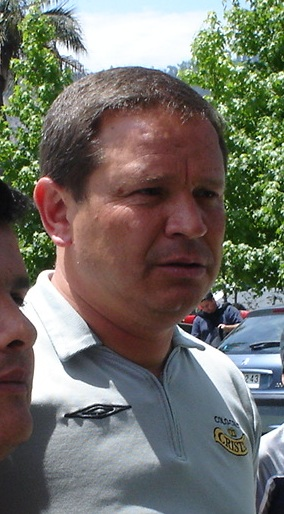
- Saavedra in 2006

Personal information
- Full name: Cristian Andrés Saavedra Iturriaga
- Date of birth: 14 June 1961 (age 65)
- Place of birth: Santiago, Chile
- Height: 1.78 m (5 ft 10 in)
- Position: Forward

Youth career
- Colo-Colo

Senior career*
| Years | Team | Apps | (Gls) |
| 1980–1987 | Colo-Colo | 133 | (37) |
| 1988 | Unión Española | 3 | (0) |
| 1988–1989 | Santos Laguna | | |
| 1989 | Deportes La Serena | 6 | (0) |
| 1990 | Meline | | |
| 1990 | Cobresal | 9 | (3) |
| 1991 | Jorge Wilstermann | 14 | (6) |

Managerial career
- 1993: Palestino (assistant)
- 2006–2008: Colo-Colo (assistant)
- 2008: Independiente (assistant)
- 2012–2013: Audax Italiano (youth)
- 2013: Lautaro de Buin
- * Club domestic league appearances and goals

Cristian Andrés Saavedra Iturriaga (born 14 June 1961) is a Chilean football manager and former player who played as a forward for clubs in Chile, Mexico and Bolivia.

== Playing career ==
A historical player of Colo-Colo, he made his debut in 1980 thanks to the coach Pedro Morales, making after up a pair with Carlos Caszely. He stayed with club until 1987, winning the league titles in 1981, 1983 and 1986 as well as the Copa Polla Gol in 1981, 1982 and 1985.

In his homeland, he also played for Unión Española (1988), Deportes La Serena (1989) and Cobresal (1990) in the top division.

Abroad, he played for Santos Laguna (1988–89) in its first season in the Mexican Primera División, Meline (1990) in Belgium and Jorge Wilstermann (1991) in Bolivia, his last club, where he made fourteen appearances and scored 6 goals.

== Managerial career ==
As a football coach, he is more known for having worked as assistant of Claudio Borghi in both Colo-Colo and Independiente.

He also worked as coach of the Audax Italiano youth ranks and Lautaro de Buin.

In addition, he served as sport manager of Deportes Pintana in 2014–15.

== Personal life ==
As a young player of Colo-Colo, he was nicknamed Lolo Gol (The Goal Teenager).

== Honours ==
=== As player ===
Colo-Colo

- Chilean Primera División: 1981, 1983, 1986
- Copa Polla Gol: 1981, 1982, 1985
