= Lizardo Garrido =

Chilean footballer (born 1957)

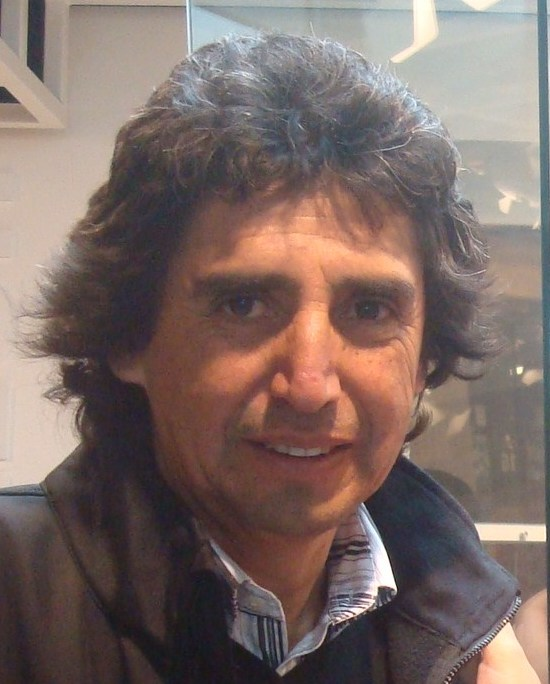

Personal information
- Full name: Lizardo Antonio Garrido Bustamante
- Date of birth: August 25, 1957 (age 69)
- Place of birth: Santiago, Chile
- Height: 1.85 m (6 ft 1 in)
- Position: Defender

Senior career*
Years	Team	Apps	(Gls)
1975–1976	Colo-Colo		
1977	Deportes Colchagua		
1978	Trasandino		
1979	Deportes Colchagua		
1980–1992	Colo-Colo		
1992–1994	Santos Laguna		

International career^{‡}
1981–1991	Chile	44	(0)
- * Club domestic league appearances and goals as of 8 June 2009 ‡ National team caps and goals as of 9 July 2007

Lizardo Antonio Garrido Bustamante (born August 25, 1957) is a retired football defender from Chile, who represented his native country at the 1982 FIFA World Cup, wearing the number two jersey. Nicknamed "El Chano", he played for several clubs in Chile, including Colo-Colo, and in Mexico for Santos Laguna. For his country Garrido was capped 44 times between 1981 and 1991, scoring no goals.

== Honours ==
=== Club ===
Colo-Colo

- Primera División de Chile (7): 1981, 1983, 1986, 1989, 1991, 1993, 1996
- Copa Chile (6): 1981, 1982, 1985, 1988, 1989, 1990
- Copa Libertadores (1): 1991
- Copa Interamericana (1): 1992
- Recopa Sudamericana (1): 1992
