= José Luis Álvarez (footballer) =

Chilean footballer (1960–2026)

Personal information
- Full name: José Luis Álvarez Núñez
- Date of birth: 8 December 1960
- Place of birth: La Serena, Chile
- Date of death: 2 March 2026 (aged 65)
- Place of death: Doñihue, Chile
- Position: Forward

Youth career
- Deportes La Serena

Senior career*
Years	Team	Apps	(Gls)
1978–1980	Deportes La Serena		
1981–1983	Colo-Colo	49	(8)
1984	O'Higgins	9	(2)
1984	Fluminense	33	(7)
1985–1986	Unión La Calera	0	(0)
1986	Magallanes		
1987	Deportes La Serena		
1988	Deportes Arica		
1989	Cobreandino		
1990	Sporting Cristal		
1991	Jorge Wilstermann		
1992	Deportes Melipilla		
1992	Municipal Talagante		

International career
1979	Chile U20		
1981	Chile	1	(0)
- * Club domestic league appearances and goals

José Luis Álvarez Núñez (8 December 1960 – 2 March 2026) was a Chilean professional footballer who played as a forward for clubs in Chile, Brazil, Peru and Bolivia.

== Club career ==
A product of Deportes La Serena youth system, he was promoted to the first team by the coach Alfonso Sepúlveda and played alongside Sergio Ahumada, his football idol. Then he moved to Colo-Colo in 1981 where he scored 18 goals in official matches.

In Chile, he also played for O'Higgins, Unión La Calera, Magallanes, Deportes Arica, Cobreandino, Deportes Melipilla and Municipal Talagante.

Abroad, he played for Fluminense in Brazil, Sporting Cristal in Peru and Jorge Wilstermann in Bolivia.

== International career ==
Álvarez represented Chile at under-20 level in the 1979 South American Championship.

At senior level, he made an appearance for the Chile national team in a friendly match of the 1981 Copa Juan Pinto Durán versus Uruguay on 29 April, making an assist to his teammate Manuel Rojas.

== Post-retirement ==
Following his retirement, Álvarez studied and worked as a bank clerk. Later, he served as security chief for Colo-Colo.

Álvarez worked as coach for amateur clubs and football academies such as the Colo-Colo Academies based in Doñihue.

Álvarez was part of "Colo-Colo de Todos los Tiempos" (Colo-Colo from All Time), a team made up by historical players of Colo-Colo that plays friendly matches around the country.

== Personal life and death ==
Born in La Serena, Chile, his parents were José Álvarez and María Adriana Núñez.

He was well known by his nickname Pelé Álvarez because he used to make feints like the Brazilian historical player.

Álvarez died from complications of liver cancer on 2 March 2026, at the age of 65, in Doñihue, Chile.

== Honours ==
Colo-Colo

- Chilean Primera División: 1981, 1983
- Copa Polla Gol: 1981, 1982

Fluminense

- Campeonato Carioca: 1984
