= Leonel Herrera (footballer, born 1948) =

Chilean footballer

Personal information
- Full name: Leonel Anselmo Herrera Rojas
- Date of birth: 10 October 1948 (age 78)
- Place of birth: Tierra Amarilla, Chile
- Height: 1.74 m (5 ft 9 in)
- Position: Centre-back

Senior career*
Years	Team	Apps	(Gls)
1967–1974	Colo-Colo		
1975–1978	Unión Española	96	(6)
1979–1986	Colo-Colo	197	(15)
1986–1987	O'Higgins		

International career
1971–1985	Chile	40	(0)

Managerial career
- 1988: Audax Italiano
- 1988: Deportes Valdivia (youth)
- 1988-1989: Deportes Valdivia
- 1990-1991: Deportes Temuco
- 1992: Deportes Arica
- 1994: Deportes Melipilla
- * Club domestic league appearances and goals

Leonel Anselmo Herrera Rojas (born 10 October 1948) is a Chilean former footballer who played as a centre-back for Colo Colo, Unión Española and O'Higgins and the Chile national team.

== Personal life ==
Herrera was born in Tierra Amarilla, Chile.

He is the father of the former Chilean footballer Leonel Herrera Silva and his cousin, Eladio Rojas, is a historical player of the Chile national team.

== Honours ==
=== Club ===
Colo-Colo

- Chilean Primera División (6): 1970, 1972, 1979, 1981, 1983, 1986
- Copa Chile (1): 1974
- Copa Polla Gol (3): 1981, 1982, 1985

Unión Española

- Chilean Primera División (1): 1977

=== International ===
Chile

- Copa del Pacífico (2): 1971, 1983
- Copa Juan Pinto Durán (2): 1971, 1979
- Copa Carlos Dittborn (1): 1973
- Copa Leoncio Provoste (1): 1973
