= Jaime Vera =

Chilean football manager and player (born 1963)

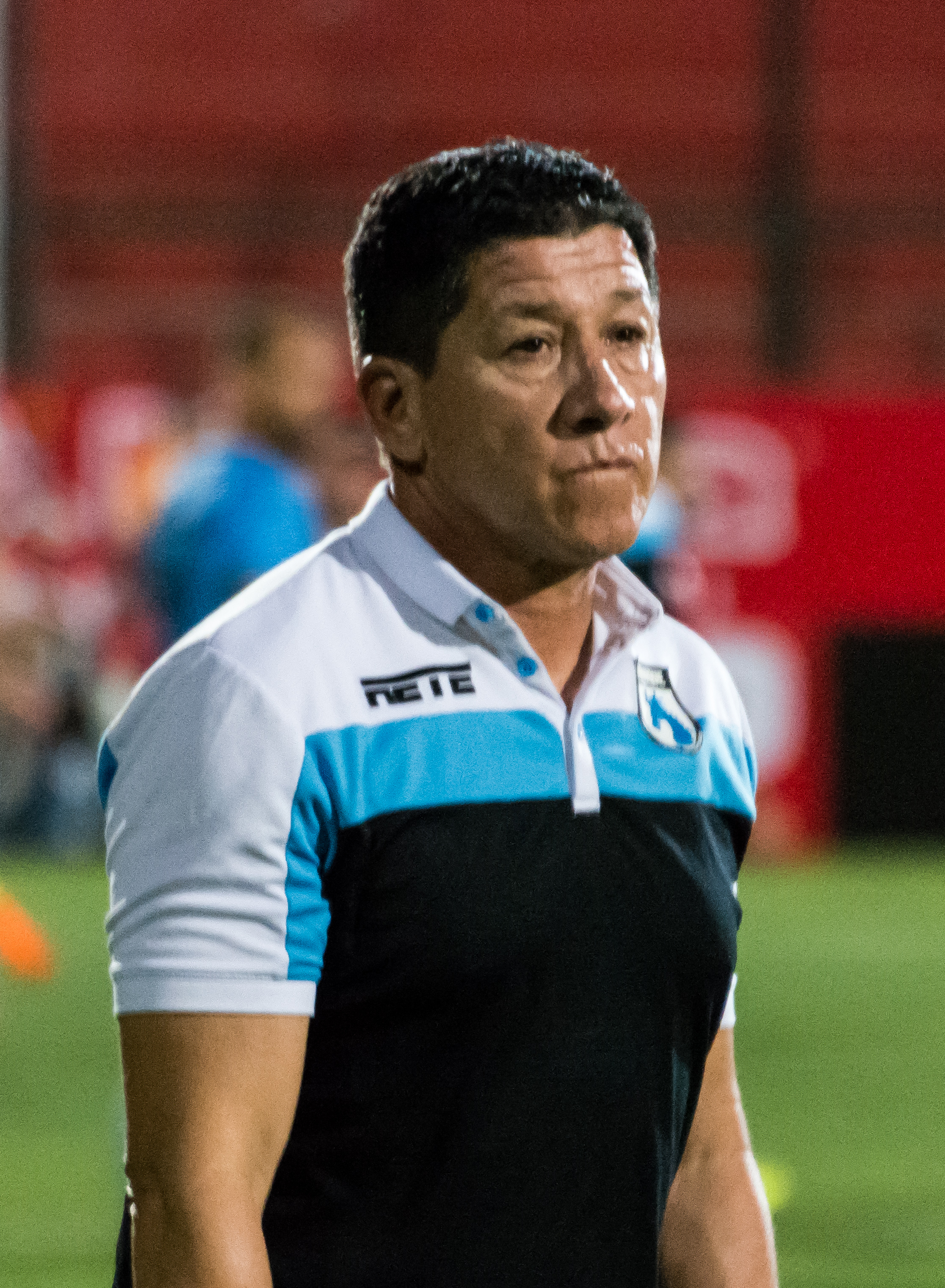
- Vera as manager of Deportes Iquique in 2020

Personal information
- Full name: Jaime Andrés Vera Rodríguez
- Date of birth: 25 March 1963 (age 63)
- Place of birth: Santiago, Chile
- Height: 1.70 m (5 ft 7 in)
- Position: Midfielder

Youth career
- 1982–1983: Colo-Colo

Senior career*
Years	Team	Apps	(Gls)
1983–1987	Colo-Colo	108	(5)
1987–1992	OFI Crete	111	(22)
1992–1993	Cobreloa	72	(3)
1993–1996	Morelia	89	(17)
Total		380	(47)

International career
1984	Chile Olympic	2	(0)
1986–1991	Chile	24	(4)

Managerial career
- 2000: Ñublense
- 2007: Colo Colo (youth)
- 2010: Deportes Puerto Montt
- 2011: Universidad de Concepción
- 2011–2012: Chile (assistant)
- 2012: Chile (caretaker)
- 2013–2014: Deportes Iquique
- 2014: Deportes Antofagasta
- 2015–2017: Deportes Iquique
- 2018–2019: Curicó Unido
- 2019: OFI Crete
- 2019–2020: Deportes Iquique
- 2022: Deportes Melipilla
- 2024–2025: Deportes Puerto Montt
- 2026: Rangers de Talca
- * Club domestic league appearances and goals

Jaime Andrés Vera Rodríguez (born 25 March 1963) is a Chilean football manager and former player who played as a midfielder.

== Club career ==
Vera began his professional career in Chile with Colo-Colo, before spending five seasons with OFI in the Greek Super League. He also had a spell with Atlético Morelia in the Primera Division de Mexico.

He is the second Chilean to play for OFI Crete after Alejandro Hisis and before Miguel Vargas and Felipe Gallegos.

== International career ==
Vera made several appearances for the senior Chile national football team, including appearing at the 1987, 1989 and 1991 Copa América.

Vera also played for Chile at the 1984 Olympic Games in Los Angeles.

At the 1987 Copa América, Vera scored the winning goal in Chile's 2–1 extra-time victory over Colombia in the semi-final, sending Chile to the final of the tournament.

== Managerial career ==
In 2024, Vera joined Deportes Puerto Montt in the Segunda División Profesional de Chile. He was released after winning the league title in 2025.

== Honours ==
=== Player ===
Colo-Colo

- Primera División de Chile (3): 1981, 1983, 1986
- Copa Chile (3): 1981, 1983, 1985

OFI

- Balkans Cup (1): 1988-89

Cobreloa

- Primera División de Chile (1): 1992

=== Manager ===
Deportes Iquique

- Copa Chile (1): 2013–14

Deportes Puerto Montt

- Segunda División Profesional de Chile (1): 2025
