= 1980 Campeonato Nacional Segunda División =

Segunda División
- Season: 1980
- Champions: San Luis de Quillota
- Promoted: San Luis de Quillota; Ñublense
- Relegated: Curicó Unido; Independiente de Cauquenes
- Top goalscorer: Víctor Cabrera (29 goals); San Luis de Quillota

The 1980 Segunda División de Chile was the 29th season of the Segunda División de Chile.

San Luis de Quillota was the tournament's champion.

== Table ==
Pos	Team	Pld	W	D	L	GF	GA	GD	Pts	Promotion or relegation
1	San Luis de Quillota (C)	42	21	15	6	72	41	+31	59 (Note: Awarded 2 bonus points)	Champions. Promoted to 1981 Primera División de Chile.
2	Ñublense (P)	42	20	15	7	70	45	+25	55	Promoted to 1981 Primera División de Chile.
3	Santiago Morning	42	19	13	10	67	49	+18	51	1980 Primera División de Chile promotion/relegation playoffs
4	Deportes La Serena	42	15	19	8	57	45	+12	50 (Note: Awarded 1 bonus point)	1980 Primera División de Chile promotion/relegation playoffs
5	Huachipato	42	16	15	11	58	49	+9	48	
6	Deportes Antofagasta	42	15	17	10	68	51	+17	47	
7	Deportes Arica	42	18	11	13	64	60	+4	47	
8	Malleco Unido	42	15	15	12	59	57	+2	45	
9	Linares Unido	42	14	16	12	60	54	+6	44	
10	Unión La Calera	42	14	14	14	53	61	−8	42	
11	San Antonio Unido	42	15	11	16	67	61	+6	41	
12	Iberia	42	14	13	15	66	65	+1	41	
13	Talagante Ferro	42	12	15	15	59	64	−5	40	
14	Cobresal	42	15	9	18	60	63	−3	39	
15	Unión San Felipe	42	13	12	17	53	62	−9	38	
16	Regional Atacama	42	13	12	17	59	70	−11	38	
17	Deportes Colchagua	42	11	15	16	49	54	−5	37	
18	Rangers	42	11	12	19	52	63	−11	35	
19	Deportes Ovalle	42	11	12	19	44	58	−14	34	
20	Trasandino	42	10	14	18	47	65	−18	34	
21	Independiente de Cauquenes (R)	42	11	12	19	52	75	−23	34	Relegated to 1981 Tercera División de Chile
22	Curicó Unido (R)	42	9	13	20	42	66	−24	31	Relegated to 1981 Tercera División de Chile

Source: rsssf.com
(C) Champions; (P) Promoted; (R) Relegated

== See also ==
- Chilean football league system
