= Leonel Herrera =

Leonel Herrera may refer to:

- Leonel Herrera (footballer, born 1948), Chilean football centre-back
- Leonel Herrera (footballer, born 1971), Chilean football defender, son of footballer born 1948
- Leonel Torres Herrera, convicted murderer and plaintiff in the United States Supreme Court case Herrera v. Collins
