= 1980 Campeonato Nacional Primera División =

Campeonato Nacional 1980
- Dates: 18 April 1980 – 7 December 1980
- Champions: Cobreloa (1st title)
- Relegated: Green Cross Temuco; Santiago Wanderers; Lota Schwager; Coquimbo Unido; Aviación (Promotion Lig.)
- 1981 Copa Libertadores: Cobreloa; Universidad de Chile (Liguilla winners)
- Matches: 306
- Goals: 783 (2.56 per match)
- Top goalscorer: Carlos Caszely (26 goals)
- Biggest home win: Colo-Colo 8–0 Naval (8 November)
- Highest attendance: 76,556 Universidad de Chile 2–4 Colo-Colo (27 September)
- Total attendance: 2,317,257
- Average attendance: 7,598

The 1980 Campeonato Nacional was Chilean football top tier's 48th season. Cobreloa was the tournament's champion, winning its first ever title, and became the first team from Northern Chile to become national champions.

== League table ==
Pos	Team	Pld	W	D	L	GF	GA	GD	Pts	Qualification or relegation
1	Cobreloa	34	17	13	4	51	25	+26	48 (Note: 1 bonus point awarded.)	Champions; Qualified to 1981 Copa Libertadores
2	Universidad de Chile	34	16	12	6	38	21	+17	45	Qualified to Liguilla Pre-Copa Libertadores
3	Colo-Colo	34	16	10	8	76	40	+36	43	Qualified to Liguilla Pre-Copa Libertadores
4	Deportes Concepción	34	15	11	8	64	49	+15	41	Qualified to Liguilla Pre-Copa Libertadores
5	O'Higgins	34	15	10	9	47	32	+15	40	Qualified to Liguilla Pre-Copa Libertadores
6	Unión Española	34	14	11	9	57	40	+17	39	
7	Everton	34	13	10	11	53	43	+10	36	
8	Magallanes	34	11	14	9	31	32	−1	36	
9	Palestino	34	12	11	11	47	42	+5	35	
10	Universidad Católica	34	12	11	11	48	48	0	35	
11	Audax Italiano	34	11	12	11	40	40	0	34	
12	Naval	34	12	10	12	35	45	−10	34	
13	Aviación	34	9	13	12	38	53	−15	31	To Promotion/relegation Liguilla
14	Deportes Iquique	34	7	14	13	32	51	−19	30 (Note: 2 bonus points awarded.)	To Promotion/relegation Liguilla
15	Coquimbo Unido	34	5	15	14	30	52	−22	25	Relegated to Segunda División
16	Lota Schwager	34	7	10	17	35	57	−22	24	Relegated to Segunda División
17	Santiago Wanderers	34	5	13	16	35	52	−17	23	Relegated to Segunda División
18	Green Cross Temuco	34	5	8	21	26	61	−35	18	Relegated to Segunda División

Notes:

Campeonato Nacional
1980 champions
Cobreloa
1st title

== Results ==
Home \ Away	AUD	AVI	CLO	COL	DCO	COQ	EVE	GCT	DIQ	LOT	MAG	NAV	OHI	PAL	UCA	UCH	UES	SWA
Audax		1–1	1–0	2–5	1–0	2–1	1–1	4–2	2–1	2–0	0–0	2–0	0–1	2–2	1–3	0–0	0–0	4–0
Aviación	0–1		1–0	0–2	2–0	0–0	2–2	1–0	1–1	4–2	2–2	0–3	0–1	1–1	3–1	0–3	1–1	3–3
Cobreloa	2–1	1–1		3–1	1–1	3–0	5–1	2–0	0–0	3–0	2–1	1–0	4–1	1–0	2–2	0–0	1–1	1–0
Colo-Colo	0–0	4–0	2–1		3–3	1–1	2–1	6–0	5–1	3–0	1–0	8–0	1–1	4–0	4–1	1–2	0–2	0–0
Concepción	2–1	4–2	0–0	3–2		4–1	0–2	5–1	6–2	1–0	3–0	0–1	1–2	2–2	3–3	1–1	2–0	4–2
Coquimbo	2–2	1–1	0–2	1–1	0–1		2–0	0–1	1–0	1–1	0–0	1–0	1–1	1–1	1–1	1–1	1–2	0–5
Everton	0–0	2–0	2–2	4–3	2–1	2–2		3–0	5–0	2–1	0–1	3–0	2–3	2–0	0–1	1–2	1–1	2–0
Green Cross T.	2–1	1–3	1–2	2–3	2–2	0–0	0–2		0–0	3–1	1–1	0–1	0–0	1–4	1–1	0–1	0–0	0–2
Iquique	3–2	0–1	0–2	1–1	2–0	0–1	5–2	2–1		1–1	0–1	1–1	0–2	1–1	1–1	1–0	0–0	2–1
Lota S.	3–1	0–1	1–1	2–2	0–1	3–3	0–3	1–1	0–0		3–1	1–2	2–0	1–2	1–0	1–1	3–4	1–0
Magallanes	1–1	1–1	0–1	1–1	1–2	1–0	1–1	2–1	0–0	1–0		1–1	0–0	1–0	1–0	0–1	1–0	2–2
Naval	1–0	3–2	0–0	3–1	2–3	2–2	1–1	0–1	0–0	0–1	1–0		1–0	3–2	1–2	0–0	3–2	0–0
O'Higgins	2–1	1–1	2–1	0–0	1–2	2–0	1–1	3–1	2–0	5–1	3–0	0–1		0–0	3–1	1–2	0–1	3–0
Palestino	1–1	4–0	1–1	2–1	2–2	0–2	1–0	1–0	2–4	2–0	0–1	1–1	1–0		1–0	0–2	3–2	5–1
U. Católica	3–0	2–0	0–1	0–2	1–1	3–2	2–0	1–0	3–1	2–2	1–1	2–2	2–4	2–1		0–1	2–1	1–1
U. de Chile	0–1	0–1	1–2	2–4	3–0	3–1	0–0	1–0	1–1	0–0	1–2	2–1	0–0	1–0	2–0		0–0	2–1
U. Española	0–1	2–2	2–2	1–0	2–2	4–0	2–1	4–1	5–1	3–0	2–2	4–0	4–2	0–3	1–2	0–2		2–1
S. Wanderers	1–1	3–0	1–1	0–2	2–2	2–0	1–2	1–2	0–0	1–2	0–3	1–0	0–0	1–1	2–2	0–0	0–2	

Legend: Blue = home team win; Yellow = draw; Red = away team win.

== Topscorers ==
Name	Team	Goals
(Chile) Carlos Caszely	Colo-Colo	26
(Chile) Víctor Estay	Unión Española	19
(Chile) Leonardo Zamora	Everton	18
(Chile) Miguel Ángel Neira	O'Higgins	16

== Liguilla Pre-Copa Libertadores ==
11 December 1980	O'Higgins	2 – 1	Colo-Colo	Estadio El Teniente, Rancagua
	Quiroz 13'; Vargas 31'		64' (pen.) Rivas	Attendance: 14,542; Referee: J. Silvagno

11 December 1980	Deportes Concepción	0 – 1	Universidad de Chile	Estadio Municipal, Concepción
			69' Socías	Attendance: 12,000; Referee: G. Castro

14 December 1980	Deportes Concepción	1 – 2	O'Higgins	Estadio Municipal, Concepción
	Santander 35'		40' Olivera; 79' Vargas	Attendance: 5,494; Referee: G. Budge

14 December 1980	Colo-Colo	2 – 2	Universidad de Chile	Estadio Nacional, Santiago
	Miranda 49'; Vasconcelos 85'		25' (pen.) Montenegro; 56' Mondaca	Attendance: 38,224; Referee: S. Vásquez

17 December 1980	O'Higgins	3 – 0	Universidad de Chile	Estadio El Teniente, Rancagua
	Neira 34'; Núñez 65', 86'			Attendance: 15,669; Referee: M. Lira

17 December 1980	Deportes Concepción	2 – 5	Colo-Colo	Estadio Municipal, Concepción
	Spedaletti 51', 74'		6' Véliz; 16' Vasconcelos; 66' Rivas; 81' Ponce; 85' Neculñir	Attendance: 8,060; Referee: V. Ojeda

20 December 1980	Universidad de Chile	1 – 0	Deportes Concepción	Estadio Nacional, Santiago
	Castec 43'			Attendance: 40,689; Referee: G. Budge

20 December 1980	Colo-Colo	3 – 0	O'Higgins	Estadio Nacional, Santiago
	Vasconcelos 65', 85'; Ponce 76'			Attendance: 40,689; Referee: G. Castro

27 December 1980	O'Higgins	1 – 1	Deportes Concepción	Estadio El Teniente, Rancagua
	Acosta 20'		59' Spedaletti	Attendance: 8,840; Referee: J. Silvagno

27 December 1980	Universidad de Chile	1 – 1	Colo-Colo	Estadio Nacional, Santiago
	Pellegrini 56'		61' (pen.) Rivas	Attendance: 70,261; Referee: S. Vásquez

30 December 1980	Universidad de Chile	1 – 0	O'Higgins	Estadio Nacional, Santiago
	Ramos 58'			Attendance: 46,146; Referee: G. Castro

30 December 1980	Colo-Colo	2 – 0	Deportes Concepción	Estadio Nacional, Santiago
	Orellana 10'; Véliz 56'			Attendance: 46,146; Referee: G. Budge

Pos	Team	Pld	W	D	L	GF	GA	GD	Pts	Qualification
1	Colo-Colo	6	3	2	1	14	7	+7	8	Qualified to Liguilla Play-off match
2	Universidad de Chile	6	3	2	1	6	6	0	8	Qualified to Liguilla Play-off match
3	O'Higgins	6	3	1	2	8	7	+1	7	
4	Deportes Concepción	6	0	1	5	4	12	−8	1	

=== Liguilla Play-off match ===
3 January 1981	Colo-Colo	1 – 2	Universidad de Chile	Estadio Nacional, Santiago
	Vasconcelos 42'		Castec 60'; Salah 86'	Attendance: 74,747; Referee: Hernán Silva

Universidad de Chile qualified to 1981 Copa Libertadores

== Promotion/relegation Liguilla ==
Pos	Team	Pld	W	D	L	GF	GA	GD	Pts	Qualification
1	Deportes Iquique	3	2	1	0	4	2	+2	5	Remains in Primera División
2	Deportes La Serena	3	0	3	0	4	4	0	3	Remains in Primera División
3	Aviación	3	0	2	1	6	7	−1	2	Relegated to Segunda División
4	Santiago Morning	3	0	2	1	2	3	−1	2	Relegated to Segunda División

Source: rsssf.com

== See also ==
- 1980 Copa Polla Gol
