= Felipe Yáñez =

Felipe Yáñez may refer to:

- Felipe Yáñez (cyclist)
- Felipe Yáñez (footballer)
