= Ethan Espinoza =

Chilean footballer

Personal information
- Full name: Ethan Mauricio Espinoza Martínez
- Date of birth: 17 January 2001 (age 25)
- Place of birth: Santiago, Chile
- Height: 1.77 m (5 ft 10 in)
- Position: Attacking midfielder

Team information
- Current team: Deportes Concepción (on loan from Colo-Colo)
- Number: 30

Youth career
- Colo-Colo

Senior career*
Years	Team	Apps	(Gls)
2020–	Colo-Colo	2	(0)
2021	→ Barnechea (loan)	25	(3)
2022	→ Fernández Vial (loan)	28	(2)
2023–2024	→ Deportes La Serena (loan)	49	(4)
2025	→ Santiago Wanderers (loan)	30	(7)
2026–	→ Deportes Concepción (loan)	7	(0)

International career
2020	Chile U20	2	(0)
- * Club domestic league appearances and goals as of 19 March 2026

Ethan Mauricio Espinoza Martínez (born 17 January 2001) is a Chilean footballer who plays as an attacking midfielder for Chilean Primera División club Deportes Concepción on loan from Colo-Colo.

== Club career ==
A product of Chilean giant Colo-Colo, Espinoza was promoted to the first team and made his professional debut in 2020. The next year, he was loaned out to Barnechea alongside his teammate Pedro Navarro.

The following seasons, Espinoza was loaned out to Primera B de Chile clubs Fernández Vial in 2022, Deportes La Serena in 2023–2024 and Santiago Wanderers in 2025. With Deportes La Serena, he won the 2024 Primera B de Chile.

In December 2025, Espinoza renewed for a year with Colo-Colo and was loaned out to Deportes Concepción in the Chilean top level.

== International career ==
Espinoza represented Chile U20 under Patricio Ormazábal in the 2020 Granja Comary International Tournament. He made appearances against Peru and Bolivia,
