= Eduardo Menichetti =

Chilean businessman

Eduardo Menichetti Pilas (1950/51 – 8 July 2007) was a Chilean businessman from Santiago, best known as the president of the football club Colo-Colo from 1990 to 1995. During his five-year tenure, the club won three Campeonato Nacional titles and three international titles.

Menichetti died from colorectal cancer on 8 July 2007 at the age of 56. He was survived by his two children.
