= 1985 Copa Polla Gol =

Tournament details
- Country: Chile

The 1985 Copa Polla Gol was the 15th edition of the Chilean Cup tournament. The competition started on January 26, 1985, and concluded on May 8, 1985. First and second level teams took part in the tournament. Colo-Colo won the competition for their fifth time, beating Palestino 1–0 in the final. The points system used in the first round of the tournament was; 2 points for the winner but, if the winner team scores 4 or more goals, they won 3 points; in case of a tie, every team took 1 point but, no points for each team if the score were 0–0. The winners of each group, plus the second place of group 3, and the two best second places of the others groups, advanced to the quarterfinals.

== Calendar ==
| Round | Date |
|---|---|
| Group Round | 26 January 1985; 21 April 1985 |
| Quarterfinals | 27–28 April 1985 |
| Semifinals | 5 May 1985 |
| Final | 8 May 1985 |

== Group Round ==
=== Group 1 ===
| | DAR | DIQ | CLO | DAN | CSA | RAT | COQ | DLS |
|---|---|---|---|---|---|---|---|---|
| D. Arica | | 1–1 | 1–0 | 3–1 | 1–1 | 1–0 | 1–1 | 1–0 |
| D. Iquique | 1–0 | | 0–1 | 2–0 | 0–2 | 0–0 | 1–0 | 1–3 |
| Cobreloa | 4–0 | 0–0 | | 2–1 | 1–0 | 2–2 | 1–0 | 1–0 |
| D. Antofagasta | 2–1 | 0–0 | 0–2 | | 2–1 | 0–3 | 0–2 | 2–0 |
| Cobresal | 3–0 | 4–0 | 0–3 | 4–2 | | 1–0 | 1–0 | 3–0 |
| R. Atacama | 4–1 | 2–0 | 0–0 | 1–0 | 0–1 | | 1–0 | 6–1 |
| Coquimbo U. | 0–0 | 2–2 | 2–3 | 2–0 | 1–1 | 2–2 | | 0–0 |
| D. La Serena | 2–0 | 0–1 | 1–1 | 0–4 | 1–1 | 2–0 | 1–1 | |

| Rank | Team | Points |
| 1 | Cobreloa | 22 |
| 2 | Cobresal | 21 |
| 3 | Regional Atacama | 16 |
| 4 | Deportes Arica | 11 |
| 5 | Deportes Iquique | 10 |
| 6 | Coquimbo Unido | 9 (-4) |
| 7 | Deportes Antofagasta | 9 (-9) |
| 8 | Deportes La Serena | 9 (-11) |

=== Group 2 ===
| | DOV | SLU | ULC | USF | TRA | QUI | EVE | SWA |
|---|---|---|---|---|---|---|---|---|
| D. Ovalle | | 1–0 | 1–0 | 1–2 | 0–2 | 1–0 | 0–1 | 4–1 |
| San Luis | 0–1 | | 0–0 | 2–2 | 5–0 | 4–1 | 0–1 | 2–0 |
| U. La Calera | 1–2 | 2–3 | | 1–1 | 1–1 | 1–1 | 3–0 | 1–1 |
| U. San Felipe | 0–0 | 1–0 | 0–4 | | 2–0 | 0–1 | 3–0 | 0–2 |
| Trasandino | 2–0 | 2–1 | 5–4 | 0–0 | | 2–1 | 0–0 | 1–0 |
| Quintero U. | 1–1 | 1–2 | 2–1 | 2–2 | 2–0 | | 1–2 | 0–2 |
| Everton | 1–1 | 2–1 | 0–3 | 1–1 | 4–0 | 1–0 | | 1–1 |
| S. Wanderers | 2–2 | 1–1 | 2–0 | 1–0 | 2–2 | 0–1 | 1–0 | |

| Rank | Team | Points |
| 1 | Deportes Ovalle | 16 (+2) |
| 2 | Everton | 16 (-1) |
| 3 | Trasandino | 16 (-5) |
| 4 | San Luis | 15 |
| 5 | Santiago Wanderers | 14 |
| 6 | Unión San Felipe | 13 |
| 7 | Unión La Calera | 11 (+3) |
| 8 | Quintero Unido | 11 (-5) |

=== Group 3 ===
| | UCA | UES | UCH | COL | PAL | AUD | MAG | OHI |
|---|---|---|---|---|---|---|---|---|
| U. Católica | | 0–1 | 1–4 | 0–1 | 1–2 | 2–1 | 3–1 | 2–0 |
| U. Española | 1–3 | | 1–0 | 1–1 | 3–3 | 1–1 | 2–3 | 2–0 |
| U. de Chile | 5–4 | 1–1 | | 2–2 | 3–2 | 1–1 | 2–2 | 1–0 |
| Colo-Colo | 1–2 | 1–0 | 2–1 | | 3–0 | 2–0 | 1–1 | 4–0 |
| Palestino | 3–2 | 2–1 | 2–1 | 3–1 | | 3–2 | 3–1 | 1–2 |
| Audax I. | 1–0 | 1–1 | 0–1 | 2–5 | 2–1 | | 1–1 | 1–0 |
| Magallanes | 2–3 | 1–5 | 1–1 | 3–5 | 3–0 | 3–2 | | 3–2 |
| O'Higgins | 0–1 | 0–3 | 1–0 | 0–3 | 1–6 | 4–2 | 1–0 | |

| Rank | Team | Points |
| 1 | Colo-Colo | 24 |
| 2 | Palestino | 18 |
| 3 | Universidad de Chile | 17 |
| 4 | Unión Española | 16 |
| 5 | Universidad Católica | 14 |
| 6 | Magallanes | 12 |
| 7 | Audax Italiano | 10 |
| 8 | O'Higgins | 9 |

=== Group 4 ===
| | USC | CUR | RAN | DLI | NAV | HUA | FVI | DCO |
|---|---|---|---|---|---|---|---|---|
| U. Santa Cruz | | 2–2 | 0–1 | 3–1 | 1–1 | 1–2 | 2–1 | 2–0 |
| Curicó U. | 3–0 | | 1–2 | 3–2 | 0–1 | 3–0 | 1–1 | 1–1 |
| Rangers | 3–1 | 1–3 | | 8–1 | 0–1 | 1–3 | 2–3 | 3–2 |
| D. Linares | 2–4 | 1–7 | 2–4 | | 0–1 | 0–3 | 1–4 | 0–1 |
| Naval | 2–2 | 4–1 | 0–0 | 5–2 | | 0–3 | 1–1 | 1–0 |
| Huachipato | 4–1 | 4–2 | 1–1 | 5–1 | 0–0 | | 1–1 | 1–2 |
| F. Vial | 1–1 | 2–0 | 1–0 | 2–0 | 3–0 | 2–0 | | 2–0 |
| D. Concepción | 2–0 | 0–0 | 2–1 | 1–0 | 1–1 | 1–0 | 1–1 | |

| Rank | Team | Points |
| 1 | Fernández Vial | 22 |
| 2 | Huachipato | 19 |
| 3 | Naval | 18 |
| 4 | Rangers | 15 (+6) |
| 5 | Deportes Concepción | 15 (+1) |
| 6 | Curicó Unido | 14 |
| 7 | Unión Santa Cruz | 13 |
| 8 | Deportes Linares | 0 |

=== Group 5 ===
| | LOT | IBE | MAL | DVI | GCC | DVA | POS | DPM |
|---|---|---|---|---|---|---|---|---|
| Lota S. | | 1–0 | 2–3 | 0–1 | 0–0 | 1–0 | 1–1 | 2–1 |
| Iberia B.B. | 2–2 | | 0–1 | 3–1 | 3–1 | 1–1 | 2–1 | 1–1 |
| Malleco U. | 1–0 | 2–1 | | 2–1 | 2–1 | 1–1 | 2–1 | 2–0 |
| D. Victoria | 2–0 | 1–0 | 3–3 | | 4–0 | 2–2 | 4–1 | 2–1 |
| Green Cross C. | 2–1 | 2–4 | 3–1 | 1–0 | | 1–2 | 3–0 | 0–4 |
| D. Valdivia | 2–1 | 2–0 | 0–0 | 4–1 | 3–0 | | 2–2 | 1–0 |
| P. Osorno | 0–1 | 3–0 | 0–1 | 2–1 | 1–1 | 0–0 | | 1–0 |
| D. Puerto Montt | 1–1 | 1–0 | 3–0 | 0–0 | 4–0 | 2–0 | 3–0 | |

| Rank | Team | Points |
| 1 | Malleco Unido | 20 |
| 2 | Deportes Valdivia | 17 |
| 3 | Deportes Puerto Montt | 16 (+11) |
| 4 | Deportes Victoria | 16 (+4) |
| 5 | Iberia Bío-Bío | 11 (-3;GF:17) |
| 6 | Lota Schwager | 11 (-3;GF:13) |
| 7 | Provincial Osorno | 9 (-8) |
| 8 | Green Cross Cautín | 9 (-14) |

== Quarterfinals ==
| Home team | Score | Away team |
|---|---|---|
| Huachipato | 1–0 | Malleco Unido |
| Fernández Vial | 0–4 | Deportes Ovalle |
| Palestino | 2–1 | Cobreloa |
| Colo-Colo | 3–1 | Cobresal |

== Semifinals ==
May 5, 1985

| Palestino | 1–0 | Huachipato |
|---|---|---|
| Núñez 83' |

Estadio Nacional, Santiago
Attendance: 10,332
Referee: M. Lira
May 5, 1985

| Colo-Colo | 4–0 | Deportes Ovalle |
|---|---|---|
| Cabrera 52'; Herrera 56' (pen.); Vera 64'; J. Gutierrez 79' |

Estadio Nacional, Santiago
Attendance: 10,332
Referee: S. Vásquez

== Final ==
May 8, 1985

| Colo-Colo | 1–0 | Palestino |
|---|---|---|
| Simaldone 57' |

Estadio Santa Laura, Santiago
Attendance: 11,285
Referee: H. Silva

== Top goalscorer ==
- Alfredo Núñez (Palestino) 11 goals
- Luis Martínez (Curicó Unido) 11 goals

== See also ==
- 1985 Campeonato Nacional

== Sources ==
- solofutbol
