= Cristian Riquelme =

Chilean footballer (born 2003)

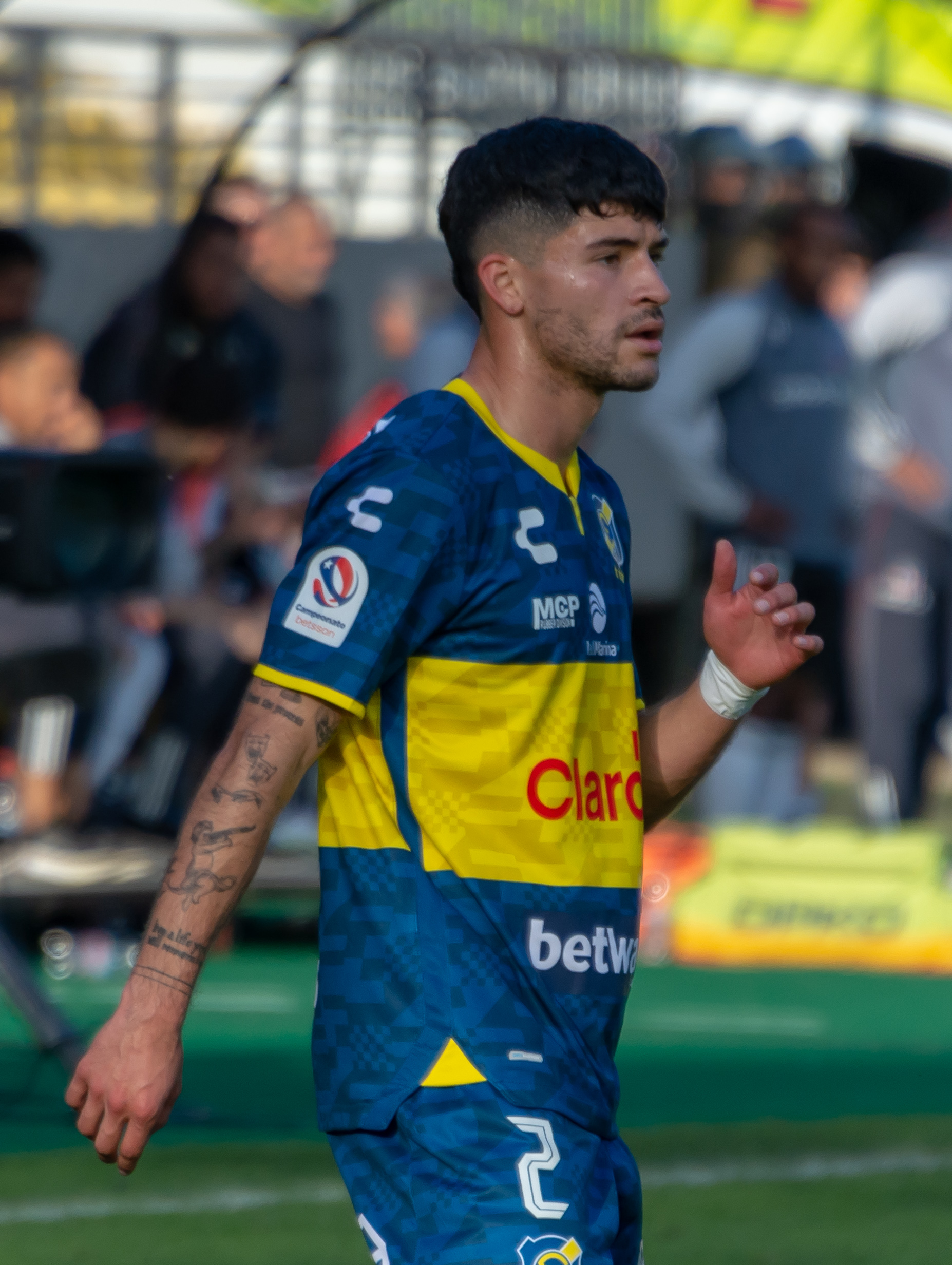
- Riquelme with Everton in 2023

Personal information
- Full name: Cristian Alonso Riquelme Piña
- Date of birth: 14 October 2003 (age 23)
- Place of birth: Casablanca, Chile
- Height: 1.73 m (5 ft 8 in)
- Position: Left-back

Team information
- Current team: Deportes Concepción (on loan from Colo-Colo)

Youth career
- 2017–2021: Everton

Senior career*
Years	Team	Apps	(Gls)
2021–2024	Everton	47	(1)
2024–	Colo-Colo	12	(0)
2026–	→ Deportes Concepción (loan)	0	(0)

International career^{‡}
2019	Chile U17	13	(0)
2022	Chile U20	1	(0)
- * Club domestic league appearances and goals as of 29 June 2026 ‡ National team caps and goals as of 14 July 2022

Cristian Alonso Riquelme Piña (born 14 October 2003) is a Chilean professional footballer who plays as a left-back for Liga de Primera club Deportes Concepción on loan from Colo-Colo.

== Club career ==
As a child, Riquelme represented his hometown team, Casablanca, and faced Everton de Viña del Mar. After this match, he joined Everton youth system at the age of 13. He made his professional debut in the 2021 Chilean Primera División match against Unión La Calera on 14 November 2021, and signed his first professional contract in February 2022.

In the second half of 2024, Riquelme switched to Colo-Colo. He was loaned out to Deportes Concepción for the second half of 2026.

== International career ==
Riquelme represented Chile at under-17 level in both the 2019 South American Championship, playing all the matches, and the 2019 FIFA World Cup, playing four matches. Since 2021, he has been frequently called up to training microcycles of Chile U20. At under-20 level, he made his debut in the friendly match versus Peru U20 on 14 July 2022.

== Personal life ==
He has stated that his football idol is Andrew Robertson.

== Career statistics ==
=== Club ===
As of 14 July 2024

Appearances and goals by club, season and competition
Club	Season	League			Cup		Continental		Total	
Club	Season	Division	Apps	Goals	Apps	Goals	Apps	Goals	Apps	Goals
Everton	2021	Chilean Primera División	3	0	—		—		3	0
Everton	2022	Chilean Primera División	7	0	2	0	3	0	12	0
Everton	2023	Chilean Primera División	25	1	3	0	—		28	1
Everton	2024	Chilean Primera División	12	0	5	0	—		17	0
Everton	Total		47	1	10	0	3	0	60	1
Colo-Colo	2024	Chilean Primera División	3	0	2	0	—		5	0
Career total			50	1	12	0	3	0	65	1
