= 1960 Campeonato Nacional Primera División =

Campeonato Nacional de Fútbol Profesional
- Dates: 14 May 1960 – 10 December 1960
- Champions: Colo-Colo (8th title)
- Relegated: Magallanes
- Copa de Campeones: Colo-Colo
- Matches: 182
- Goals: 577 (3.17 per match)
- Top goalscorer: Juan Falcón (21 goals)
- Biggest away win: Rangers 1–6 San Luis (15 May)
- Highest attendance: 44,614 Universidad de Chile 2–1 Universidad Católica (26 November)
- Total attendance: 1,180,166
- Average attendance: 6,484

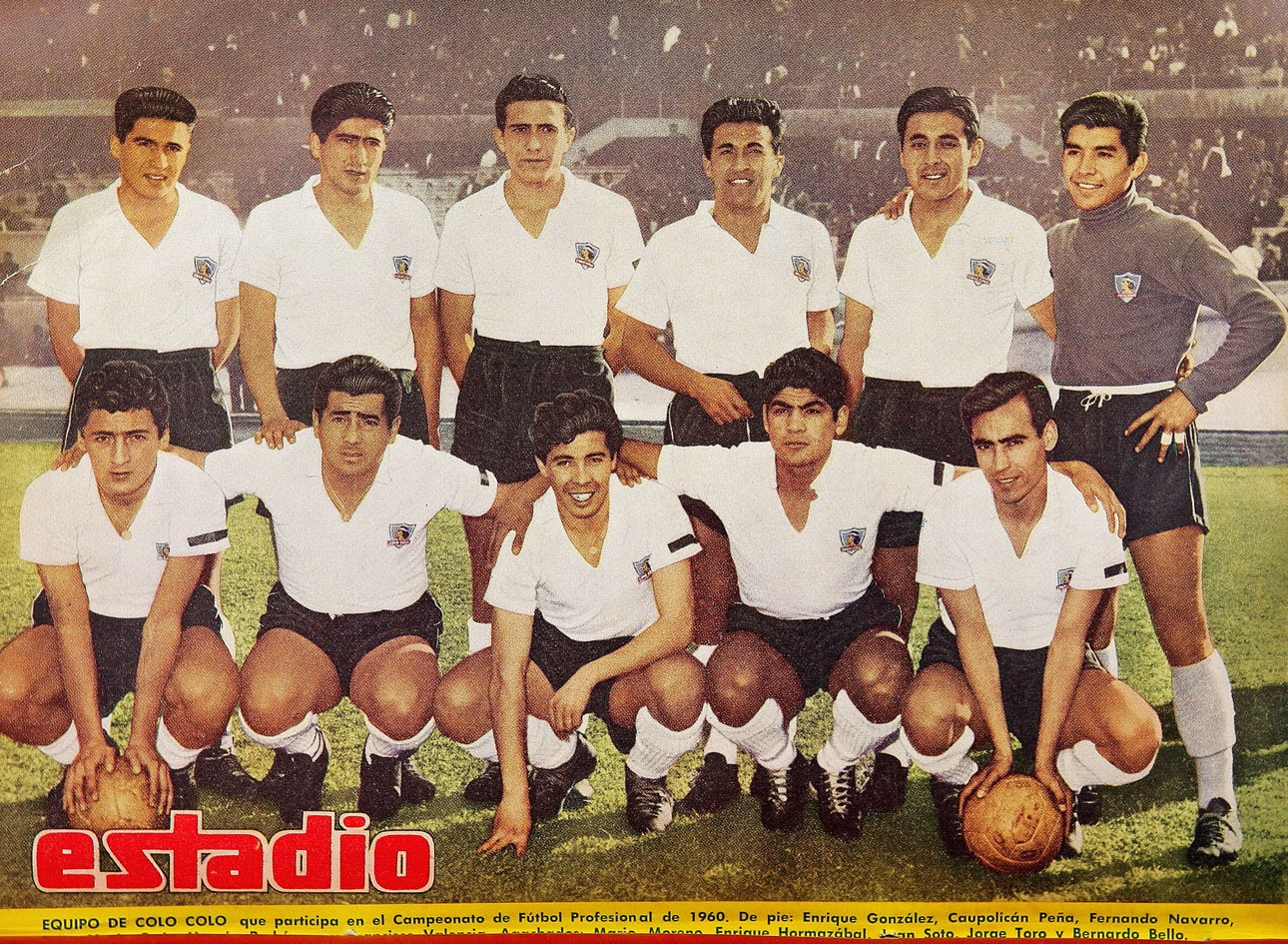
Colo-Colo on June 9, 1960

The 1960 Campeonato Nacional de Fútbol Profesional, was the 28th season of top-flight football in Chile. Colo-Colo won their eighth title following a 5–2 win against Rangers in the championship last match day on 10 December 1960, also qualifying to the 1961 Copa de Campeones de America.

== League table ==
Pos	Team	Pld	W	D	L	GF	GA	GD	Pts	Qualification
1	Colo-Colo	26	14	7	5	52	31	+21	35	Champions and qualified for the Copa de Campeones
2	Santiago Wanderers	26	12	8	6	43	28	+15	32	
3	Universidad de Chile	26	14	3	9	46	40	+6	31	
4	Everton	26	13	4	9	48	39	+9	30	
5	Palestino	26	11	7	8	50	42	+8	29	
6	Unión Española	26	11	5	10	40	48	−8	27	
7	Santiago Morning	26	9	7	10	36	37	−1	25	
8	O'Higgins	26	8	9	9	40	44	−4	25	
9	Magallanes	26	11	2	13	42	38	+4	24	
10	Audax Italiano	26	7	10	9	27	32	−5	24	
11	Rangers	26	10	4	12	32	46	−14	24	
12	San Luis	26	9	4	13	40	45	−5	22	
13	Ferrobádminton	26	8	2	16	40	49	−9	18	
14	Universidad Católica	26	5	8	13	41	58	−17	18	

== Results ==
Home \ Away	AUD	COL	EVE	FEB	MAG	OHI	PAL	RAN	SLU	SMO	UES	UCA	UCH	SWA
Audax		0–0	3–1	1–1	2–1	0–0	0–3	1–1	1–1	2–1	2–3	2–2	0–1	0–2
Colo-Colo	0–0		0–4	4–1	2–1	4–0	3–1	5–2	4–2	0–0	1–2	2–2	1–2	0–0
Everton	0–0	1–2		1–0	1–3	2–1	0–0	2–0	3–2	2–1	3–4	3–2	3–2	1–3
Ferrobádminton	3–0	1–3	3–2		2–4	1–2	2–3	4–1	2–1	1–2	0–1	3–0	0–2	0–1
Magallanes	1–0	0–1	0–4	4–2		2–2	1–0	1–3	1–2	3–0	2–3	4–2	2–3	2–1
O'Higgins	4–2	2–2	2–0	1–2	1–0		3–3	1–0	0–0	4–2	2–4	1–1	1–1	2–2
Palestino	1–1	2–1	1–1	3–2	0–4	2–3		2–1	2–1	1–1	4–1	3–2	2–3	3–0
Rangers	1–2	1–4	0–1	1–1	0–2	5–2	1–0		1–6	1–1	2–1	2–1	2–1	2–1
San Luis	0–4	3–1	1–3	0–2	1–0	2–0	0–4	1–2		1–3	1–0	2–2	3–1	1–2
S. Morning	0–1	1–2	2–0	2–0	2–0	1–0	1–3	1–2	3–1		1–1	0–0	3–1	1–3
U. Española	2–0	1–1	1–5	3–1	1–0	1–1	1–1	3–0	0–4	2–4		0–1	2–1	1–1
U. Católica	1–1	2–5	3–1	3–2	1–3	0–2	3–2	0–0	2–3	2–2	4–1		2–4	2–6
U. de Chile	2–1	0–3	1–2	2–3	1–0	3–2	4–2	0–1	1–0	1–1	4–1	2–1		1–0
S. Wanderers	0–1	0–1	2–2	2–1	1–1	2–1	2–2	2–0	1–1	3–0	2–0	2–0	2–2	

Legend: Blue = home team win; Yellow = draw; Red = away team win.

== Relegation table ==
Pos	Team	1958	1959	1960	Average
1	Colo-Colo	33	38	35	35,33
2	Santiago Wanderers	34	34	32	33,33
2	Universidad de Chile	31	38	31	33,33
4	O'Higgins	23	34	25	27,33
5	Palestino	31	19	29	26,33
6	Everton	24	22	30	25,33
7	Unión Española	22	26	27	25,00
7	Santiago Morning	--	--	25	25,00
9	Ferrobádminton	24	27	18	23,00
10	Universidad Católica	27	23	18	22,67
11	Audax Italiano	22	20	24	22,00
11	Rangers	21	21	24	22,00
11	San Luis	--	22	22	22,00
14	Magallanes	18	23	24	21,67

Relegated to 1961 Segunda División de Chile

Primera División de Chile
1960 champion

8th title

== Topscorer ==
Name	Team	Goals
(Argentina) Juan Falcón	Palestino	21

== See also ==
- 1960 Copa Preparación
