= Leonel Herrera (footballer, born 1971) =

Chilean footballer

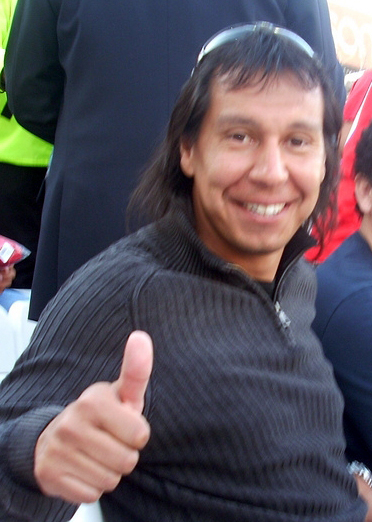
- Herrera in 2009

Personal information
- Full name: Leonel Marcelo Herrera Silva
- Date of birth: August 16, 1971
- Place of birth: Santiago, Chile
- Position: Defender

Youth career
- Colo-Colo

Senior career*
Years	Team	Apps	(Gls)
1989	Colo-Colo		
1990	Deportes Concepción		
1991	Colo-Colo		
1992	Deportes La Serena		
1993	Colo-Colo		
1994	Deportes Antofagasta		
1995	Colo-Colo		
1996	Correcaminos UAT		
1997	Deportes Temuco		
1997–1998	St. Gallen		
1998	Deportes Iquique		
1999–2001	Palestino		
2002	Audax Italiano		
- * Club domestic league appearances and goals

Leonel Marcelo Herrera Silva (born August 16, 1971) is a Chilean former professional footballer who played as a defender for clubs in Chile, Mexico and Switzerland, and politician who is a councillor for the Santiago commune.

== Personal life ==
Born in Santiago, Chile, he is the son of the former Chilean international footballer Leonel Herrera Rojas, who is also the cousin of Eladio Rojas, a historical player at the 1962 FIFA World Cup.

In the 2016 Chilean municipal elections, Herrera was elected as a councillor for the Santiago commune running as an independent supporting the Independent Democratic Union.

== Teams ==
- Colo-Colo 1989
- Deportes Concepción 1990
- Colo-Colo 1991
- Deportes La Serena 1992
- Colo-Colo 1993
- Deportes Antofagasta 1994
- Colo-Colo 1995
- Correcaminos 1996
- Deportes Temuco 1997
- Saint Gallen 1997–1998
- Deportes Iquique 1998
- Palestino 1999–2001
- Audax Italiano 2002

== Honours ==
Colo-Colo

- Chilean Primera División: 1989, 1991, 1993
