= Pedro Navarro (footballer) =

Chilean footballer (born 2001)

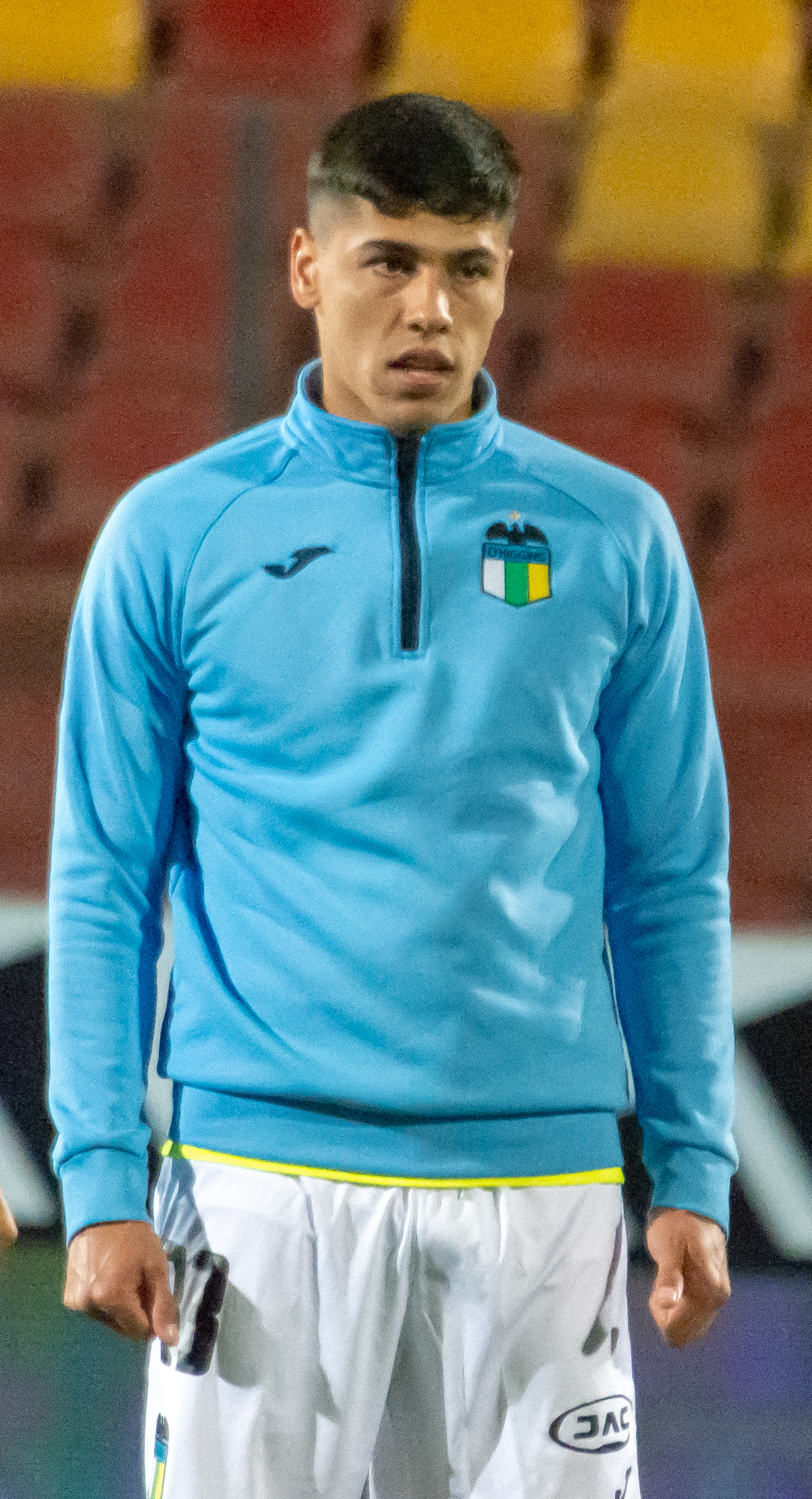
- Navarro with O'Higgins in 2023.

Personal information
- Full name: Pedro Ignacio Navarro Castillo
- Date of birth: 30 March 2001 (age 25)
- Place of birth: Santiago de Chile, Chile
- Height: 1.75 m (5 ft 9 in)
- Position: Left-back

Team information
- Current team: Santiago Wanderers (on loan from Colo-Colo)

Youth career
- Colo-Colo

Senior career*
Years	Team	Apps	(Gls)
2020–	Colo-Colo	2	(0)
2021	→ Barnechea (loan)	27	(0)
2023–2024	→ O'Higgins (loan)	18	(0)
2025	→ Unión San Felipe (loan)	28	(1)
2026–	→ Santiago Wanderers (loan)	0	(0)

International career
2020	Chile U20	3	(0)
- * Club domestic league appearances and goals as of 29 December 2025

Pedro Ignacio Navarro Castillo (born 30 March 2001) is a Chilean footballer who plays as a left-back for Santiago Wanderers on loan from Colo-Colo.

== Career ==
Navarro was presented as new player of O'Higgins at July 2023, being one of the three transfers allowed in the winter transfer market.

During 2025, Navarro played on loan for Unión San Felipe in the Primera B de Chile. The next season, he was loaned out to Santiago Wanderers.
