= Felipe Yáñez (footballer) =

Chilean footballer (born 2004)

Personal information
- Full name: Felipe Ariel Yáñez Parra
- Date of birth: 18 October 2004 (age 22)
- Place of birth: Puente Alto, Santiago, Chile
- Height: 1.70 m (5 ft 7 in)
- Position: Left-back

Team information
- Current team: Magallanes (on loan from Colo-Colo)
- Number: 24

Youth career
- 2013–2021: Colo-Colo

Senior career*
Years	Team	Apps	(Gls)
2021–	Colo-Colo	1	(0)
2022	→ Coquimbo Unido (loan)	22	(0)
2023	→ Coquimbo Unido (loan)	5	(0)
2024	→ Ñublense (loan)	11	(0)
2025	→ Unión La Calera (loan)	19	(0)
2026–	→ Magallanes (loan)	1	(0)

International career^{‡}
2019	Chile U15	4	(0)
2022	Chile U20	1	(0)
- * Club domestic league appearances and goals as of 24 February 2026 ‡ National team caps and goals as of 1 December 2022

Felipe Ariel Yáñez Parra (born 18 October 2004) is a Chilean professional footballer who plays as a left-back for Magallanes on loan from Colo-Colo.

== Club career ==
Yáñez came to Colo-Colo at the age of 8 and made his professional debut in the 2021 Primera División match against Audax Italiano on October 28, 2021. In 2022 he was loaned to Coquimbo Unido after having signed his first contract as a professional footballer with Colo-Colo. In 2023, he returned to Colo-Colo, but he was loaned to Coquimbo Unido again on second half of the same year.

In 2024, Yáñez was loaned out to Ñublense. The next year, he was loaned out to Unión La Calera on a one-year deal. In 2026, he switched to Magallanes.

== International career ==
In April 2019, Yáñez took part of the Chile U15 squad at the UEFA U-16 Development Tournament in Finland. and also represented Chile at the 2019 South American U-15 Championship, playing all the matches. After being called up to training microcycles of Chile at under-17 and under-20 levels, in 2022 he represented Chile U20 in a friendly match against Paraguay U20.

== Personal life ==
He has stated that his football idol is Gary Medel.

== Career statistics ==
=== Club ===
As of 16 August 2022

Appearances and goals by club, season and competition
Club	Season	League			Cup		Continental		Other		Total	
Club	Season	Division	Apps	Goals	Apps	Goals	Apps	Goals	Apps	Goals	Apps	Goals
Colo-Colo	2021	Chilean Primera División	1	0	0	0	0	0	0	0	1	0
Colo-Colo	2022	Chilean Primera División	0	0	0	0	0	0	0	0	0	0
Colo-Colo	Total		1	0	0	0	0	0	0	0	1	0
Coquimbo Unido (loan)	2022	Chilean Primera División	21	0	1 (Note: Appearances in the Copa Chile)	0	–		0	0	22	0
Career total			22	0	1	0	0	0	0	0	23	0
