= 1986 Campeonato Nacional Primera División =

Campeonato Nacional 1986
- Dates: 5 July 1986 – 28 January 1987
- Champions: Colo-Colo (15th title)
- Relegated: Unión San Felipe; Audax Italiano; Magallanes
- 1987 Copa Libertadores: Colo-Colo; Cobreloa (Liguilla winners)
- Matches: 307
- Goals: 770 (2.51 per match)
- Top goalscorer: Sergio Salgado (28 goals)
- Biggest home win: Colo-Colo 6–0 Audax Italiano (21 September)
- Highest attendance: 77,848 Colo-Colo 1–1 Universidad de Chile (16 November)
- Total attendance: 2,067,431
- Average attendance: 6,756

The 1986 Campeonato Nacional was Chilean football league top tier's 54th season. Colo-Colo was the tournament's champion, winning its fifteenth title.

== League table ==
Pos	Team	Pld	W	D	L	GF	GA	GD	Pts	Qualification or relegation
1	Colo-Colo	34	19	10	5	49	23	+26	48	Championship Play-off
2	Palestino	34	18	12	4	63	42	+21	48	Championship Play-off
3	Cobreloa	34	15	14	5	53	28	+25	44	Qualified to Liguilla Pre-Copa Libertadores
4	Cobresal	34	13	14	7	53	35	+18	40	Qualified to Liguilla Pre-Copa Libertadores
5	Huachipato	34	15	10	9	50	38	+12	40	Qualified to Liguilla Pre-Copa Libertadores
6	Universidad Católica	34	15	8	11	56	41	+15	38	
7	Naval	34	12	14	8	41	35	+6	38	
8	Universidad de Chile	34	14	7	13	41	40	+1	35	
9	Deportes Concepción	34	10	15	9	40	44	−4	35	
10	San Luis	34	7	17	10	39	43	−4	31	
11	Deportes Iquique	34	8	15	11	35	44	−9	31	
12	Fernández Vial	34	7	16	11	34	37	−3	30	
13	Unión Española	34	9	12	13	45	51	−6	30	
14	Everton	34	6	17	11	33	38	−5	29	
15	Rangers	34	6	17	11	33	42	−9	29	
16	Unión San Felipe	34	8	13	13	37	50	−13	29	Relegated to 1987 Segunda División
17	Audax Italiano	34	4	11	19	28	70	−42	19	Relegated to 1987 Segunda División
18	Magallanes	34	5	8	21	38	67	−29	18	Relegated to 1987 Segunda División

== Results ==
Home \ Away	AUD	CLO	CSA	COL	DCO	EVE	FVI	HUA	DIQ	MAG	NAV	PAL	RAN	SFE	SLU	UCA	UCH	UES
Audax		0–2	1–0	1–2	1–1	0–0	1–1	2–4	2–2	1–1	0–2	3–4	2–3	2–1	1–1	0–3	1–0	1–1
Cobreloa	4–1		0–0	2–0	5–1	2–1	2–1	1–0	2–1	4–0	1–2	1–1	1–0	3–0	1–1	2–2	2–0	4–0
Cobresal	4–0	2–2		1–3	3–1	0–0	1–0	0–0	3–0	2–0	1–0	3–3	4–2	1–0	1–1	3–0	3–0	3–0
Colo-Colo	6–0	2–0	2–1		1–0	0–0	1–0	1–1	2–0	1–0	2–1	1–3	1–0	3–0	0–0	2–0	1–1	1–0
Concepción	0–0	1–1	1–1	1–1		0–0	1–2	3–2	0–1	2–1	0–0	1–2	0–0	3–1	4–1	1–0	2–1	3–3
Everton	1–2	1–2	0–0	0–1	1–1		1–1	1–3	1–1	4–2	1–0	2–2	3–0	0–2	2–1	0–0	0–2	2–0
F. Vial	1–1	1–1	1–1	1–0	0–0	1–0		1–1	1–1	0–1	0–0	0–1	0–0	2–0	1–1	3–1	2–1	3–3
Huachipato	5–0	1–0	1–4	1–1	2–3	2–1	1–1		1–1	1–0	1–1	4–0	0–0	3–0	2–0	4–1	1–0	1–1
Iquique	3–2	2–1	1–1	1–2	2–2	0–0	1–0	2–0		1–0	1–2	0–0	0–0	2–0	2–0	0–1	0–0	2–2
Magallanes	2–0	2–2	1–2	0–3	0–1	1–1	0–1	2–0	2–2		1–2	2–2	2–2	0–3	1–4	2–5	2–3	3–2
Naval	1–0	1–1	1–1	3–1	2–0	3–3	3–3	3–0	2–0	0–0		1–2	1–1	2–2	1–1	1–0	1–0	1–3
Palestino	0–0	1–1	2–1	1–4	1–1	1–1	3–2	3–0	3–0	3–2	1–0		2–1	5–1	2–0	0–1	0–1	1–0
Rangers	2–0	0–1	0–0	1–1	2–1	2–2	1–1	0–1	1–1	3–1	1–2	1–1		1–1	1–1	2–2	1–0	0–2
San Felipe	2–0	0–0	1–1	1–1	1–1	2–1	1–1	1–1	1–1	3–3	3–0	0–0	1–1		1–0	2–2	0–1	1–0
San Luis	3–1	0–0	1–1	0–0	1–1	0–0	1–0	0–1	2–0	3–1	2–2	3–3	2–2	1–3		1–1	2–1	1–1
U. Católica	3–0	2–1	4–2	1–2	5–1	3–0	2–1	2–0	2–0	2–0	0–0	2–3	2–1	5–1	1–1		1–1	1–0
U. de Chile	3–0	1–1	4–1	1–0	0–1	1–1	2–1	1–2	1–1	1–3	2–0	0–3	1–1	1–0	3–2	1–0		3–2
U. Española	2–2	0–0	1–1	0–0	0–0	0–2	2–0	1–3	5–3	1–0	0–0	2–4	3–0	2–2	1–0	2–0	2–3	

Legend: Blue = home team win; Yellow = draw; Red = away team win.

== Championship play-off ==
28 January 1987

Colo-Colo	2 – 0	Palestino
Vera 66'; Rubio 89'

Estadio Nacional, Santiago
Attendance: 73,967
Referee: Salvador Imperatore

Campeonato Nacional
1986 champion
Colo-Colo
15th title

== Topscorer ==
Name	Team	Goals
(Chile) Sergio Salgado	Cobresal	28

== Liguilla Pre-Copa Libertadores ==
1 February 1987	Cobreloa	1 – 1	Cobresal	Estadio Nacional, Santiago
	Letelier 11'		71' Pedetti	Attendance: 7,264; Referee: E. Marín

1 February 1987	Palestino	1 – 0	Huachipato	Estadio Nacional, Santiago
	Núñez 88'			Attendance: 7,264; Referee: S. Vásquez

4 February 1987	Cobreloa	2 – 0	Huachipato	Estadio Nacional, Santiago
	Letelier 36'; Merello 40' (pen.)			Attendance: 7,208; Referee: V. Ojeda

4 February 1987	Palestino	1 – 1	Cobresal	Estadio Nacional, Santiago
	Montenegro 33'		14' Martínez	Attendance: 7,208; Referee: G. Castro

7 February 1987	Huachipato	2 – 1	Cobresal	Estadio Nacional, Santiago
	Navarrete 9'; Bustos 90'		27' Salgado	Attendance: 7,643; Referee: S. Imperatore

7 February 1987	Palestino	2 – 3	Cobreloa	Estadio Nacional, Santiago
	Olguín 8', 52'		1', 42' Covarrubias; 16' Letelier	Attendance: 7,643; Referee: G. Bugde

Pos	Team	Pld	W	D	L	GF	GA	GD	Pts	Qualification
1	Cobreloa	3	2	1	0	5	3	+2	5	Qualified to 1987 Copa Libertadores
2	Palestino	3	1	1	1	4	4	0	3	
3	Cobresal	3	0	2	1	3	4	−1	2	
4	Huachipato	3	1	0	2	2	3	−1	2	

Source: rsssf.com

== See also ==
- 1986 Copa Polla Lan Chile
