= Carlos Caszely =

Chilean footballer (born 1950)

Carlos Caszély
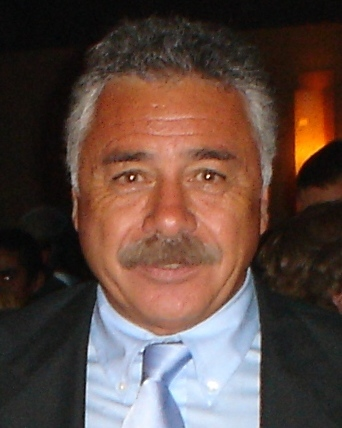
- Caszély in 2006

Personal information
- Full name: Carlos Humberto Caszely Garrido
- Date of birth: 5 July 1950 (age 76)
- Place of birth: Santiago, Chile
- Height: 1.70 m (5 ft 7 in)
- Position: Forward

Youth career
- Colo-Colo

Senior career*
Years	Team	Apps	(Gls)
1967–1973	Colo-Colo	123	(66)
1973–1975	Levante	24	(15)
1975–1978	Espanyol	46	(20)
1978–1985	Colo-Colo	170	(105)
1986	Barcelona SC	8	(4)
Total		371	(210)

International career
1969–1985	Chile	49	(29)
1976	Catalonia	1	(0)
- * Club domestic league appearances and goals

Carlos Humberto Caszely Garrido (born 5 July 1950) is a Chilean former professional footballer, nicknamed "Rey del metro cuadrado" (English: King of the square meter, Portuguese: O Rei do Metro Quadrado), who played as a forward.

Regarded as one of Chile's most important players, between 1969 and 1985, Caszely won 48 caps and scored 29 goals for the Chile national team, including participations in the 1974 and 1982 World Cups.

== Club career ==
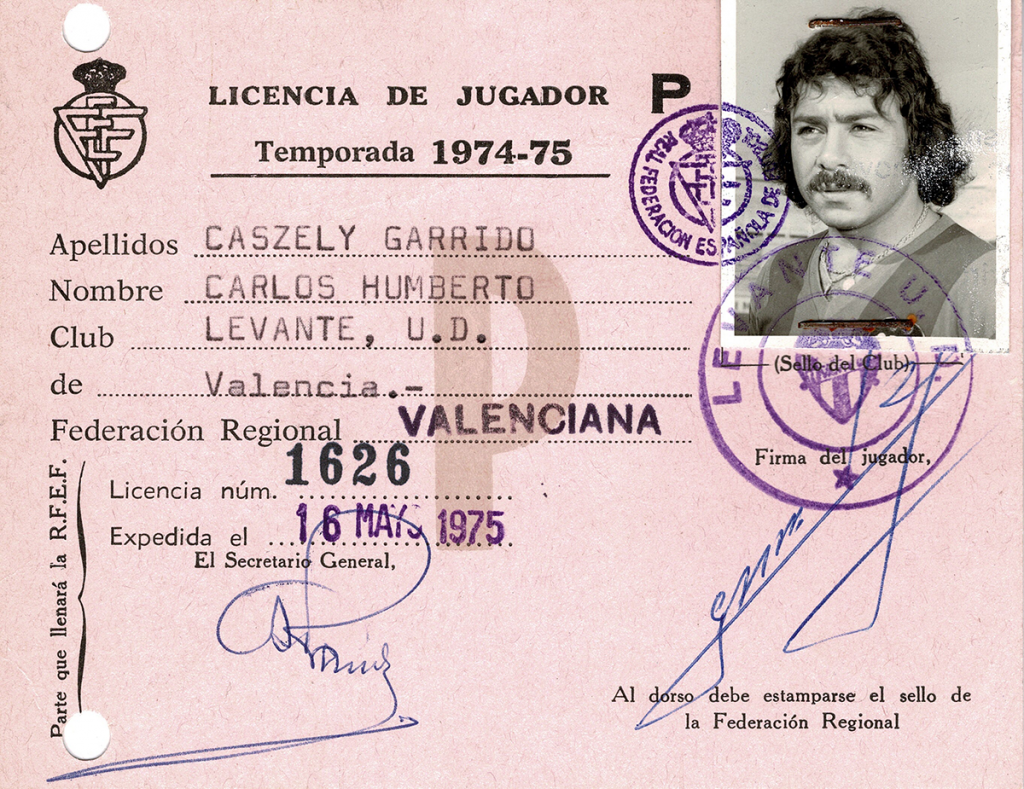
Caszely federative document with Levante UD.

Caszely was born in Santiago, Chile. He played for several football teams in his career, including Colo-Colo (1968–1973), Levante UD (1973–1975), RCD Espanyol (1975–1978), finally returning to Colo-Colo (1978–1985). He ended his career with Barcelona SC in 1986.

== International career ==
During the opening 1974 FIFA World Cup match against West Germany, Caszely was given a red card by the match referee, Doğan Babacan, becoming the first player to be sent off in this manner (red and yellow cards wouldn’t be introduced until the 1970 tournament). In the 1982 World Cup he missed a penalty against Austria. In June 1976, Caszely played for the national team of Catalonia in a friendly against the Soviet Union, providing an assist to Johan Neeskens.

In addition to official matches with Chile, Caszely also scored 14 goals in B-class matches against opponents such as River Plate, Palmeiras, Boca Juniors, Paris Saint-Germain, among others.

== Personal life ==
His grandson, Franco Garrido Caszely, is a youth player from the Colo-Colo youth system.

== Political views ==
Caszely was revered by many Chileans as a supporter of the left under the Pinochet dictatorship and as one of the few leading Chilean footballers to declare his opposition to the regime. He and his mother appeared in advertisements supporting the "No" vote opposing an extension of Pinochet's rule in the 1988 Chilean presidential referendum.

Caszely served as press attaché in sports in the Embassy of Chile in Spain from June 2014 to April 2015 under the Presidency of Michelle Bachelet.

== Outside football ==
In the 1970s, Caszely studied Physical Education at the University of Chile.

Caszely had worked as a host for several sport related TV shows on Canal 13, a Chilean-based TV station and plays football at amateur level for a team called "Colo-Colo 1973", composed of former Colo-Colo players.

Caszely got a degree in business administration at the University of Navarra.

In the 1990s, he finished his second Bachelor of Arts at the University of Santiago, Chile, where he studied journalism.

== Honours ==
Colo Colo

- Primera División de Chile: 1970, 1972, 1979, 1981, 1983
- Copa Chile: 1981, 1982, 1985

Individual

- Chilean League's Top Scorer: 1979, 1980, 1981
- 1973 Copa Libertadores: Top Scorer
- Best player in 1979 Copa América
- 2009 Award of CONMEBOL by exalt to South American soccer
