= Alfredo Núñez =

Chilean footballer (1960–2008)

Personal information
- Full name: Alfredo Horacio Núñez Mendoza
- Date of birth: 16 February 1960
- Place of birth: Tomé, Chile
- Date of death: 15 March 2008 (aged 48)
- Place of death: Antofagasta, Chile
- Position: Midfielder

Youth career
- Marcos Serrano
- 1978–1979: Universidad Católica

Senior career*
Years	Team	Apps	(Gls)
1980	Iberia-Bío Bío		
1981	Trasandino		
1982	Iberia-Bío Bío		
1983–1984	Malleco Unido		
1984–1988	Palestino	104	(51)
1987	→ Atlas (loan)		
1989	Deportes La Serena	–	(–)
1989	Naval	23	(5)
1990	Everton	14	(6)
1991	Unión La Calera		
1992	Santiago Wanderers	–	(–)
1992–1993	Unión La Calera		
1994	San Luis	–	(–)
1995	Unión La Calera		

International career
1984	Chile Olympic		
1985–1988	Chile	3	(1)

Managerial career
- 1996–1997: Unión La Calera
- 1997: Unión San Felipe
- 1998: Unión La Calera
- 2001: San Luis
- 2004–2005: Unión La Calera
- 2006: Unión La Calera
- 2008: Ñublense (assistant)
- * Club domestic league appearances and goals

Alfredo Horacio Núñez Mendoza (16 February 1960 – 15 March 2008) was a Chilean footballer.

== International career ==
Núñez was a member of the Chile team at the 1984 Olympic Games.

At senior level, he made three appearances and scored one goal.

== Personal life ==
He was well known by his nickname Torpedo.

As the assistant coach of Fernando Díaz in Ñublense, he died of a heart attack while participating in a friendly match against the technical staff of Deportes Antofagasta on 15 March 2008.
