= Víctor Cabrera (Chilean footballer) =

Chilean footballer (1957–2026)

Personal information
- Full name: Víctor Hugo Cabrera Sánchez
- Date of birth: 9 November 1957
- Place of birth: Quillota, Chile
- Date of death: c. 2 April 2026 (aged 68)
- Place of death: Quillota, Chile
- Position: Forward

Senior career*
Years	Team	Apps	(Gls)
1978–1981	San Luis	118	(65)
1982	Everton	64	(16)
1983–1984	Regional Atacama	33	(21)
1985	Colo-Colo	28	(8)
1986	Everton	19	(2)
1987	Deportes Concepción	16	(3)
1988	Deportes La Serena	8	(0)
1989	Unión La Calera	15	(2)
1990–1992	Regional Atacama	26	(4)
1993	Quintero Unido		
- * Club domestic league appearances and goals

Víctor Hugo Cabrera Sánchez (9 November 1957 – c. 2 April 2026) was a Chilean footballer. A forward, he was one of the most prolific goalscorers in Chilean football history.

== International career ==
Cabrera was part of a Chile squad which was called Selección Joven (young squad), with Luis Santibáñez as the team coach, that was preparing for the 1982 FIFA World Cup.

== Personal life and death ==
Cabrera was better known by his nickname Pititore: a fusion between Pituco, a Chilean way of referring to people from the aristocracy, and Cantatore, the surname of the football coach Vicente, who was well-known at the time. The nickname was born when Cabrera worked as a cleaner for wealthy women – "viejas pitucas" according to him – and used to sing (cantar in Spanish), turning the word cantar into Cantatore.

Cabrera's body was discovered on 2 April 2026. He was 68. He had been suffering from various illnesses, foremost among them diabetes. Authorities in the commune of Quillota believed that he might have died as long as four days before he was found.
