= Severino Vasconcelos =

Brazilian footballer

Severino Vasconcelos Barbosa (born September 24, 1951 in Olinda, Pernambuco, Brazil) is a former Brazilian naturalized Chilean footballer who has played for clubs in Brazil, Chile and Ecuador.

== Career ==
He played for Chilean sides Colo-Colo, Universidad de Chile and Palestino, before retiring and becoming a coach. He managed Ecuadorian side Deportivo Quevedo during 2005.

== Teams ==
- (Brazil) Íbis 1970
- (Brazil) Riachuelo 1971–1972
- (Brazil) Alecrim 1973
- (Brazil) Náutico 1974
- (Brazil) Palmeiras 1975–1976
- (Brazil) Internacional 1977–1978
- (Brazil) America-RJ 1978
- (Chile) Colo-Colo 1979–1985
- (Ecuador) Barcelona SC 1985–1986
- (Chile) Deportes La Serena 1987–1988
- Universidad de Chile 1989
- (Chile) Palestino 1990–1993

== Titles ==
- (Chile) Colo-Colo 1979, 1981 and 1983 (Primera División)
- Colo-Colo 1981 and 1982 (Copa Chile)
- Universidad de Chile 1989 Primera B
- (Ecuador) Barcelona SC 1985 (Primera División)
