= 1981 Copa Polla Gol =

Tournament details
- Country: Chile

The 1981 Copa Polla Gol was the 11th edition of the Chilean Cup tournament. The competition started on February 28, 1981, and concluded on May 16, 1981. Only first level teams took part in the tournament. Colo-Colo won the competition for their third time, beating Audax Italiano, 5–1, in the final. The points system in the first round awarded 2 points for a win, and increased to 3 points if the team scored 4 or more goals. In the event of a tie, each team was awarded 1 point, but no points were awarded if the score was 0–0.

== Calendar ==
| Round | Date |
|---|---|
| Group Round | 16 February 1981; 3 May 1981 |
| Quarterfinals | 6–10 May 1981 |
| Semi-finals | 13 May 1981 |
| Final | 16 May 1981 |

== Group Round ==
Key to colours in group tables
Teams that progressed to the Quarterfinals

=== Group 1 ===
| | DIQU | CLOA | DLSE | EVER | SLUI |
|---|---|---|---|---|---|
| D. Iquique | | 2–0 | 2–1 | 3–4 | 1–1 |
| Cobreloa | 3–0 | | 6–0 | 2–0 | 2–0 |
| D. La Serena | 4–3 | 2–4 | | 1–0 | 2–2 |
| Everton | 3–1 | 1–2 | 5–0 | | 5–5 |
| San Luis | 1–3 | 1–1 | 4–0 | 1–0 | |

| Rank | Team | Points |
| 1 | Cobreloa | 15 |
| 2 | Everton | 9 (+3) |
| 3 | San Luis | 9 (+1) |
| 4 | Deportes Iquique | 7 |
| 5 | Deportes La Serena | 6 |

=== Group 2 ===
| | UESP | UCAT | PALE | COLO | UCHI | AUDA |
|---|---|---|---|---|---|---|
| U. Española | | 2–1 | 3–1 | 1–1 | 1–1 | 1–3 |
| U. Católica | 3–1 | | 2–0 | 1–1 | 3–1 | 1–2 |
| Palestino | 0–2 | 1–1 | | 0–3 | 2–4 | 1–2 |
| Colo-Colo | 2–2 | 2–2 | 1–1 | | 1–0 | 1–1 |
| U. de Chile | 3–0 | 1–0 | 2–4 | 0–2 | | 2–2 |
| Audax I. | 0–1 | 1–0 | 2–0 | 1–1 | 1–1 | |

| Rank | Team | Points |
| 1 | Audax Italiano | 14 |
| 2 | Colo-Colo | 13 |
| 3 | Unión Española | 11 |
| 4 | Universidad de Chile | 10 |
| 5 | Universidad Católica | 9 |
| 6 | Palestino | 5 |

=== Group 3 ===
| | NAVA | DCON | ÑUBL | MAGA | OHIG |
|---|---|---|---|---|---|
| Naval | | 2–0 | 0–0 | 2–1 | 1–2 |
| D. Concepción | 0–2 | | 5–1 | 0–0 | 0–1 |
| Ñublense | 1–2 | 1–2 | | 1–2 | 0–1 |
| Magallanes | 0–0 | 1–1 | 4–0 | | 2–3 |
| O'Higgins | 0–0 | 3–2 | 3–0 | 1–0 | |

| Rank | Team | Points |
| 1 | O'Higgins | 14 |
| 2 | Naval | 8 |
| 3 | Magallanes | 6 (+2) |
| 4 | Deportes Concepción | 6 (-1) |
| 5 | Ñublense | 0 |

== Quarterfinals ==
| Team 1 | Agg. | Team 2 | 1st leg | 2nd leg |
|---|---|---|---|---|
| Unión Española | 4–3 | San Luis | 3–3 | 1–0 |
| Naval | 0–6 | Colo-Colo | 0–3 | 0–3 |
| Cobreloa | 1–3 | Audax Italiano | 0–1 | 1–2 |
| Everton | 4–1 | O'Higgins | 2–0 | 2–1 |

== Semifinals ==
13 May 1981

| Audax Italiano | 2 – 1 | Unión Española |
|---|---|---|
| Letelier 81'; Batista 88' | | 34' Donoso |

Estadio Nacional, Santiago
Attendance: 19,305
Referee: M. Lira

13 May 1981

| Colo-Colo | 2 – 1 | Everton |
|---|---|---|
| Saavedra 13'; Hormazábal 58' | | 27' Spedaletti |

Estadio Nacional, Santiago
Attendance: 19,305
Referee: V. Ojeda

== Final ==
16 May 1981

| Colo-Colo | 5 – 1 | Audax Italiano |
|---|---|---|
| Díaz 28'; Saavedra 34'; Vasconcelos 53', 66'; Santander 61' | | 82' Letelier |

Estadio Nacional, Santiago
Attendance: 33,345
Referee: J. Silvagno

== Top goalscorers ==
- Víctor Cabrera (San Luis) 8 goals,
- Leonardo Zamora (Everton) 8 goals

== See also ==
- 1981 Campeonato Nacional
