= 1982 Copa Polla Gol =

Tournament details
- Country: Chile

The 1982 Copa Polla Gol was the 12th edition of the Chilean Cup tournament. The competition started on March 13, 1982, and concluded on June 10, 1982. Only first level teams took part in the tournament. Colo-Colo won the competition for the fourth time, winning the final liguilla. The points system in the first round awarded 2 points for a win, increased to 3 points if the team scored 4 or more goals. In the event of a tie, each team was awarded 1 point, but no points were awarded if the score was 0–0.

== Calendar ==
Round	Date
Group Round	13 March 1982; 16 May 1982
Quarterfinals	20–23 May 1982
Final Liguilla	30 May 1982; 10 June 1982

== Group Round ==
Key to colours in group tables
Teams that progressed to the Quarterfinals

=== Group 1 ===
	DIQU	CLOA	DLSE	DARI	RATA
D. Iquique		2–1	2–1	1–1	6–2
Cobreloa	1–1		4–0	4–1	3–0
D. La Serena	1–4	2–1		2–6	2–3
D. Arica	1–1	1–1	2–0		4–1
R. Atacama	0–0	1–2	4–0	2–2	

Rank	Team	Points
1	Deportes Iquique	13
2	Cobreloa	12 (+9)
3	Deportes Arica	12 (+6)
4	Regional Atacama	6
5	Deportes La Serena	2

=== Group 2 ===
	UESP	UCAT	PALE	COLO	UCHI	AUDA
U. Española		1–2	0–0	1–0	1–1	2–2
U. Católica	2–2		1–2	0–5	2–1	4–2
Palestino	2–3	0–2		0–2	1–1	1–2
Colo-Colo	1–0	0–1	3–2		0–3	4–1
U. de Chile	2–0	0–0	2–1	0–0		3–1
Audax I.	0–2	4–3	1–2	1–0	1–2	

Rank	Team	Points
1	Universidad de Chile	12 (+8)
2	Colo-Colo	12 (+6)
3	Universidad Católica	12 (0)
4	Unión Española	9
5	Audax Italiano	8
6	Palestino	5

=== Group 3 ===
	NAVA	MAGA	RANG	SMOR	OHIG
Naval		2–1	5–1	2–1	2–2
Magallanes	4–1		7–2	1–0	1–2
Rangers	4–1	0–2		2–2	1–1
S. Morning	1–1	1–2	0–6		2–4
O'Higgins	1–1	0–1	2–2	4–2	

Rank	Team	Points
1	Magallanes	14
2	O'Higgins	12
3	Naval	10
4	Rangers	9
5	Santiago Morning	2

== Quarterfinals ==
Team 1	Agg.	Team 2	1st leg	2nd leg
Cobreloa	7–2	Magallanes	5–1	2–1
Deportes Arica	2–6	Colo-Colo	1–4	1–2
O'Higgins	1–2	Universidad de Chile	1–1	0–1
Universidad Católica	3–1	Deportes Iquique	2–1	1–0

== Final Liguilla ==
=== First matchday ===
30 May 1982

Universidad de Chile	0 – 2	Universidad Católica
		8', 20' Valentini

Estadio Nacional, Santiago
Attendance: 28,766
Referee: H. Silva
30 May 1982

Colo-Colo	1 – 0	Cobreloa
Álvarez 85'

Estadio Nacional, Santiago
Attendance: 28,766
Referee: V. Ojeda

=== Second matchday ===
5 June 1982

Universidad Católica	1 – 1	Cobreloa
Olmos 78'		89' Ahumada

Estadio Nacional, Santiago
Attendance: 17,220
Referee: M. Lira
5 June 1982

Colo-Colo	3 – 1	Universidad de Chile
Vasconcelos 43'; Houseman 70'; Álvarez 80'		20' Silva

Estadio Nacional, Santiago
Attendance: 17,220
Referee: J. Silvagno

=== Third matchday ===
10 June 1982

Universidad de Chile	1 – 0	Cobreloa
Liminha 38'

Estadio Nacional, Santiago
Attendance: 3,331
Referee: G. Budge
10 June 1982

Colo-Colo	2 – 0	Universidad Católica
Own-goal 14'; Vasconcelos 65'

Estadio Nacional, Santiago
Attendance: 3,331
Referee: S. Vásquez

== Top goalscorers ==
- Luis Marcoleta (Magallanes) 8 goals,
- Severino Vasconcelos (Colo-Colo) 8 goals

== See also ==
- 1982 Campeonato Nacional

== Sources ==
- RSSSF
