= 1981 Campeonato Nacional Primera División =

Campeonato Nacional 1981
- Dates: 11 July 1981 – 24 January 1982
- Champions: Colo-Colo (13th title)
- Relegated: Ñublense; Everton; Deportes Concepción; San Luis
- 1982 Copa Libertadores: Colo-Colo; Cobreloa (Liguilla winners)
- Matches: 240
- Goals: 661 (2.75 per match)
- Top goalscorer: Carlos Caszely; Luis Marcoleta; Víctor Cabrera (20 goals)
- Biggest home win: Naval 8–1 Ñublense (2 January 1982)
- Highest attendance: 74,570 Universidad de Chile 0–2 Colo-Colo (13 December)
- Total attendance: 1,991,278
- Average attendance: 8,567

The 1981 Campeonato Nacional was Chilean league top tier's 49th season. Colo-Colo was the tournament's champion, winning its thirteenth title.

== League table ==
Pos	Team	Pld	W	D	L	GF	GA	GD	Pts	Qualification or relegation
1	Colo-Colo	30	19	8	3	63	22	+41	48 (Note: 2 bonus points awarded.)	Champions; Qualified to 1982 Copa Libertadores
2	Cobreloa	30	20	6	4	53	21	+32	46	Qualified to Liguilla Pre-Copa Libertadores
3	Universidad de Chile	30	16	8	6	50	34	+16	40	Qualified to Liguilla Pre-Copa Libertadores
4	Unión Española	30	12	10	8	44	32	+12	35 (Note: 1 bonus point awarded.)	Qualified to Liguilla Pre-Copa Libertadores
5	Naval	30	11	11	8	46	34	+12	33	Qualified to Liguilla Pre-Copa Libertadores
6	Magallanes	30	12	8	10	45	39	+6	32	
7	Audax Italiano	30	10	10	10	42	40	+2	31	
8	Universidad Católica	30	11	8	11	41	33	+8	30	
9	Deportes La Serena	30	10	9	11	40	49	−9	29	
10	O'Higgins	30	9	9	12	40	44	−4	27	
11	Palestino	30	7	12	11	32	36	−4	26	To Promotion/relegation Liguilla
12	Deportes Iquique	30	9	8	13	43	53	−10	26	To Promotion/relegation Liguilla
13	San Luis	30	8	9	13	38	50	−12	25	Relegated to Segunda División
14	Deportes Concepción	30	7	10	13	33	46	−13	24	Relegated to Segunda División
15	Everton	30	5	12	13	36	60	−24	23	Relegated to Segunda División
16	Ñublense	30	2	6	22	17	70	−53	10	Relegated to Segunda División

Notes:

Campeonato Nacional
1981 champions
Colo-Colo
13th title

== Results ==
Home \ Away	AUD	CLO	COL	DCO	EVE	DIQ	DLS	MAG	NAV	ÑUB	OHI	PAL	SLU	UCA	UCH	UES
Audax		0–1	0–2	0–0	1–1	4–1	2–3	1–1	2–2	3–0	0–2	1–1	2–1	3–2	1–4	0–1
Cobreloa	2–1		3–1	4–0	4–0	1–1	4–0	3–1	3–1	5–1	2–0	1–0	4–1	0–0	2–0	1–0
Colo-Colo	1–1	2–0		3–0	5–2	0–1	3–2	3–0	0–0	2–1	1–1	3–1	6–1	0–0	1–1	2–1
Concepción	2–0	0–1	0–4		0–1	5–2	0–0	0–0	3–1	1–1	1–1	2–0	0–2	2–1	4–0	0–2
Everton	2–2	1–2	1–1	2–2		1–3	1–1	1–2	1–0	2–0	3–1	1–1	1–1	0–0	2–2	1–2
Iquique	2–1	2–1	0–2	0–1	6–1		2–0	1–1	1–1	4–1	0–0	0–0	3–2	3–1	2–2	1–3
La Serena	1–2	2–2	0–2	4–3	3–0	2–1		1–1	1–2	4–0	3–0	1–1	0–1	1–1	1–0	4–2
Magallanes	1–3	0–0	1–4	2–1	5–1	3–1	4–0		1–0	3–1	3–2	4–1	3–1	0–2	1–2	1–1
Naval	1–0	0–0	1–1	0–0	2–0	4–0	3–1	2–2		8–1	1–0	1–0	4–2	1–1	0–1	0–0
Ñublense	2–5	0–1	0–5	0–0	1–2	0–0	1–2	0–1	1–1		0–1	1–0	1–0	1–1	0–1	0–0
O'Higgins	0–0	2–0	1–0	4–1	5–3	6–4	0–0	1–2	3–1	2–1		1–1	1–1	1–3	1–3	0–0
Palestino	0–1	1–2	1–2	2–2	0–0	2–1	0–0	1–0	1–1	4–1	2–0		1–1	1–1	1–1	1–4
San Luis	0–0	0–1	0–2	4–1	3–2	3–0	0–0	0–0	2–3	3–0	1–1	0–3		2–1	2–4	2–2
U. Católica	1–2	2–0	1–2	2–1	2–0	1–0	6–0	2–1	4–2	1–0	3–2	0–2	1–2		0–1	0–0
U. de Chile	1–1	0–0	0–2	2–0	2–2	0–0	4–1	2–1	1–3	5–0	2–1	1–0	3–0	2–1		3–1
U. Española	2–3	2–3	1–1	1–1	1–1	4–1	1–2	1–0	1–0	3–1	4–2	2–3	0–0	1–0	3–0	

Legend: Blue = home team win; Yellow = draw; Red = away team win.

== Topscorers ==
Name	Team	Goals
(Chile) Carlos Caszely	Colo-Colo	20
(Chile) Luis Marcoleta	Magallanes	20
(Chile) Víctor Cabrera	San Luis	20

== Liguilla Pre-Copa Libertadores ==
27 January 1982	Unión Española	3 – 3	Cobreloa	Estadio Nacional, Santiago
	L. Rojas 37'; Donoso 82'; Pinto 87'		3' Siviero; 16' Olivera; 34' Alarcón	Attendance: 20,095; Referee: J. Silvagno

27 January 1982	Universidad de Chile	1 – 0	Naval	Estadio Nacional, Santiago
	Pellegrini 57'			Attendance: 20,095; Referee: S. Vásquez

30 January 1982	Unión Española	0 – 1	Naval	Estadio Nacional, Santiago
			50' (pen.) Espinoza	Attendance: 27,676; Referee: M. Lira

30 January 1982	Universidad de Chile	1 – 2	Cobreloa	Estadio Nacional, Santiago
	Gamboa 32' (pen.)		13' Siviero; 58' Own-goal	Attendance: 27,676; Referee: G. Castro

3 February 1982	Cobreloa	2 – 1	Naval	Estadio Nacional, Santiago
	Own-goal 2'; Alarcón 61'		18' Flores	Attendance: 17,243; Referee: V. Ojeda

3 February 1982	Universidad de Chile	2 – 1	Unión Española	Estadio Nacional, Santiago
	Mondaca 57'; Hoffens 60'		68' Baquela	Attendance: 17,243; Referee: G. Budge

Pos	Team	Pld	W	D	L	GF	GA	GD	Pts	Qualification
1	Cobreloa	3	2	1	0	7	5	+2	5	Qualified to 1982 Copa Libertadores
2	Universidad de Chile	3	2	0	1	4	3	+1	4	
3	Naval	3	1	0	2	2	3	−1	2	
4	Unión Española	3	0	1	2	4	6	−2	1	

Source: rsssf.com

== Promotion/relegation Liguilla ==
Pos	Team	Pld	W	D	L	GF	GA	GD	Pts
1	Palestino	3	2	1	0	4	2	+2	5
2	Deportes Iquique	3	1	2	0	7	6	+1	4
3	Deportes Antofagasta	3	0	2	1	4	5	−1	2
4	Coquimbo Unido	3	0	1	2	4	6	−2	1

Source: rsssf.com

== See also ==
- 1981 Copa Polla Gol
