= Colo-Colo =

Chilean football club based in Macul, Santiago

- Full name: Club Social y Deportivo Colo-Colo
- Nicknames: El Cacique; Eterno Campeón (The Eternal Champion); Los Albos (The Whites)
- Founded: 19 April 1925; 101 years ago
- Ground: Estadio Monumental David Arellano, Macul, Greater Santiago
- Capacity: 47,347
- President: Aníbal Mosa (Blanco y Negro); Edmundo Valladares (Corporation)
- Manager: Daniel Morón
- Coach: Fernando Ortiz
- League: Liga de Primera
- 2025: Liga de Primera, 8th of 16
- Website: colocolo.cl
Home colours	Away colours	Third colours

Colo-Colo (Spanish pronunciation: [ˌkolo ˈkolo]), officially Club Social y Deportivo Colo-Colo, is a Chilean professional football club based in Macul, Santiago. Founded in 1925 by David Arellano, it competes in the Chilean Primera División, from which the club has never been relegated. The team has played its home games at Estadio Monumental David Arellano since 1989. Colo-Colo is regarded as the most successful club in Chilean football.

Colo-Colo has won 35 Primera División de Chile titles, more than any other Chilean club and a record fourteen Copa Chile titles. It was the first Chilean team to win a continental tournament, winning the 1991 Copa Libertadores. The following year, the club went on to win a further two international titles: the 1992 Recopa Sudamericana and the 1992 Copa Interamericana,

The club's all-time top scorer is Carlos Caszely with 208 goals, and the player with most appearances is the former defender Lizardo Garrido with 560 games. Luis Mena, dubbed the "historic one", won eleven titles for the club, a Chilean league record.

Colo-Colo is the most supported team in Chile. According to CONMEBOL, it is considered the most popular sports club in Chile with more than 7 million fans as of April 2016. Colo-Colo holds a long-standing rivalry with Universidad de Chile. The club also holds a traditional rivalry in matches against Cobreloa and Universidad Católica. The IFFHS ranked the team in 14th place in 2007. In 2009, the IFFHS also named the team as the top club in Chile for the 20th century, and one of the top twenty clubs in South American football history.

== History ==
=== 1925–1933: Foundation and early years ===
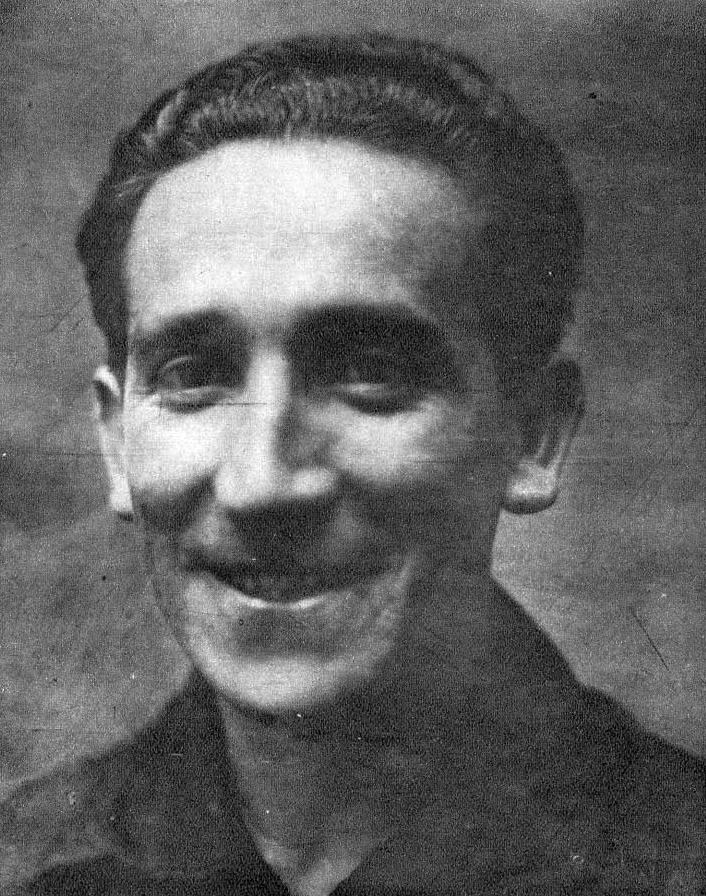
David Arellano, the founder of the club

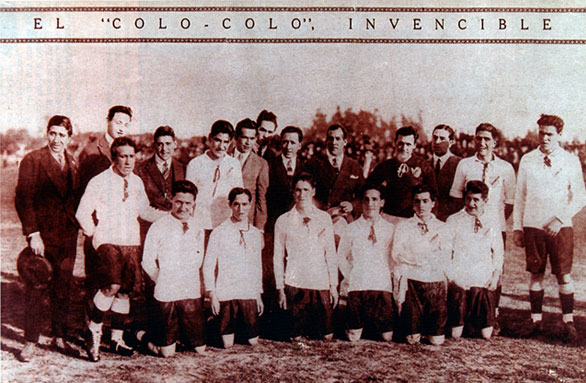
One of the first Colo-Colo line-ups, 1925

The team was founded in early 1925 by Magallanes' footballer David Arellano, who led a group of young players leaving that club after institutional problems. Finally, after meetings and negotiations, on 19 April 1925 Arellano and the other youths officially established the club, with Luis Contreras choosing the name "Colo-Colo" for the club, in reference to the legendary cacique (chieftain) Colo Colo of the Mapuche people, who fought against the colonial Spaniards in the 16th-century Arauco War.

Initially the team played friendly games, but in 1926 Colo-Colo took part in their first competition, the Metropolitan League of Honour, where they were proclaimed champions (unbeaten) and earned the nickname of "invincible". The following year, Colo-Colo became the first Chilean football team to participate in a tour across Europe. However, on 2 May, during an exhibition match against Real Unión Deportiva at Valladolid, the team founder and captain David Arellano was critically injured after suffering a collision with an opposing player, which caused him peritonitis. The inflammation led to his death the next day. Despite the great impact caused by Arellano's death, the club won the Central League of football tournament – then renamed Asociación de Football de Santiago – in the 1928, 1929 and 1930 seasons.

In the 1931–32 season, Colo-Colo suffered its first institutional crisis due to financial problems, which led to a salary reduction for first team footballers and board members, with their consequent resistance. That season the team played another tournament final against Audax Italiano. However, due to a platform collapse at Estadio Italiano and the subsequent fracas between the fans, it was decided that the game would be suspended. In that moment, Colo-Colo were winning 2–1. That day's tragedy resulted in 130 injuries and three deaths. The match was cancelled and the champion position for that year remained vacant. Other authors however declared that both Audax Italiano and Colo-Colo were declared champions.

=== 1933–1973: Beginnings in professional football ===
In 1933, Colo-Colo alongside six clubs from Santiago decided to create the Chilean professional football league. On 23 July, the team won the Campeonato de Apertura (Copa Chile precursor), after defeating 2–1 to Unión Española. However, in the first Primera División official tournament, Colo-Colo finished first alongside Magallanes, which forced the "Cacique" to play a tie-breaker match. That match was lost 2–1 by Colo-Colo. In 1937 the team was undefeated, and reached its first league title. Two seasons later, in 1939, Colo-Colo won the league title for a second time, now under the guidance of the Hungarian coach Francisco Platko, and with Alfonso Domínguez as goalscorer with 20 goals in 24 matches. After another title in 1941 with Platko as coach, the club went on to win the titles of 1944 and 1947. The following year Colo-Colo organized the South American Club Championship – Copa Libertadores background – in Santiago, which brought together the 1947 continent's champions. In 1945, the club had the worst season in its history, finishing penultimate in eleventh place only ahead of weak Badminton.

In the early 1950s, club's president Antonio Labán hired Newcastle United striker George Robledo, paying £25,000 for its signing. Robledo's performances led the team to the titles of 1953 and 1956. During that age, the club acquired a terrain at Macul, where began the construction of Estadio Monumental. Besides the acquisition, the directive invested in a headquarters located at Santiago Centro (located at Cienfuegos 41) in 1953. The next decade Colo-Colo win the titles of 1960 and 1963. The 1963 team broke two top-tier records: Luis Hernán Álvarez scored 37 goals in a single season (the highest number of goals scored by a Colo-Colo footballer during a season) and the netting of the highest number of goals scored by a club in a season (130). The team won its tenth honour in 1970.

=== Colo-Colo 1973 and 1980s dominance ===
In 1972, under the orders of coach Luis Álamos and boasting star players in play maker Francisco Valdés and goal scorer Carlos Caszely, the club won another championship. It also obtained the country's highest average attendance record of 45,929 people for a single league season. That team was the spine of the aptly-named "Colo-Colo 73" side that captured the nation's heart becoming the first Chilean side to reach a Copa Libertadores final, where it lost to Independiente of Argentina. After Colo-Colo's brilliant Copa campaign, the club fell into an institutional crisis unable to replicate its success on the pitch failing to win another league title until 1979. That team featured the talented Brazilian midfielder Severino Vasconcelos alongside Carlos Caszely returning from his stint in Spanish football. Nevertheless, in 1975, the construction of Estadio Monumental was completed and the stadium was inaugurated in a league match against Deportes Aviación, but due to problems with infrastructure and other basic services the stadium was closed indefinitely.

In the 1980s, the club obtained the league titles of 1981 and 1983 with coach Pedro García, and the 1986 and 1989 honours under Arturo Salah. The 1987 Alianza Lima air disaster claimed the lives of sixteen players and Colo-Colo was the first to help the Peruvian giants, loaning 4 players. Nonetheless, the team won four Copa Chile titles in that decade. During that period, the greatest disappointment was at continental level with the team only reaching the group stage in the 1988 Copa Libertadores. On 30 September 1989, the Estadio Monumental was re-inaugurated with an exhibition match against Peñarol, which Colo-Colo won 2–1 with goals by Marcelo Barticciotto and Leonel Herrera, the son of a legendary 1970s former defender of the same name.

=== 1991–1999: International success ===
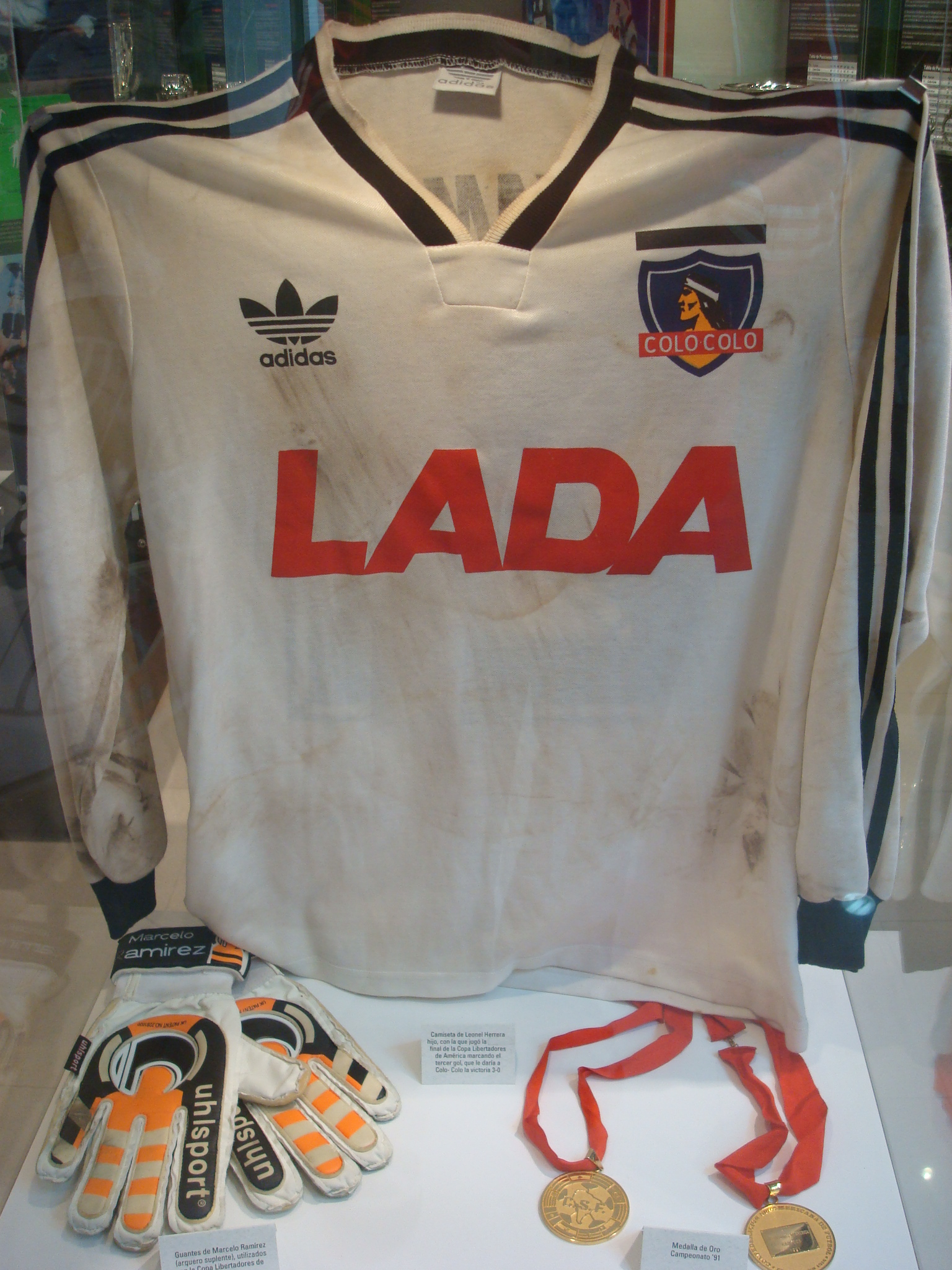
Colo-Colo's uniform at the 1991 Copa Libertadores Finals

The 1990s was the most successful decade in the club's history gaining both domestic and international titles. Eduardo Menichetti was president of the club between 1990 and 1995 and Croatian Mirko Jozić arrived as coach, leading the team towards its first Bicampeonato for winning two national championship league titles in a row. On 5 June 1991, after beating Olimpia 3–0 at the Monumental with two goals scored by Luis Pérez and one by Leonel Herrera, Colo-Colo became the first Chilean team to win a Copa Libertadores. That same season, the "Albos" lost the Intercontinental Cup final 3–0 against Yugoslav giants Red Star Belgrade, in Tokyo. At local level, the club won the 1991 league season, its third-consecutive title thus achieving its first Tricampeonato. The following season, the club won the Recopa Sudamericana, after beating Brazil's Cruzeiro in a penalty shootout, and also obtained the Copa Interamericana, after winning 3–1 against Puebla in Mexico. The last title won by Jozić in Colo-Colo was the 1993 league title, thus closing a successful spell in South America.

After Jozić's departure came a brief drought in national league titles, but the team managed to achieve an unforgettable 3–0 win over arch rivals Universidad de Chile in the 1995 season. Colo-Colo lifted the 1994 Copa Chile title and reached the 1994 Copa Libertadores quarterfinals. The following season saw the arrival of Paraguayan coach Gustavo Benítez, who obtained the 1996, 1997-C and 1998 league titles. The team advanced to the semifinals of the Supercopa Libertadores in 1996, and of the Copa Libertadores in 1997, eliminated on both occasions by Cruzeiro. In 1999, Colo-Colo relived its fortunes like in the 1994 season, finishing fourth in the Chilean league and going through three coaches in the same season: Brazilian Nelsinho Baptista, caretaker coach Carlos Durán and then Fernando Morena of Uruguay, who remained until 2001.

=== 1999–present: Bankruptcy and recovery ===
In 1999, after Benítez's departure, the club entered a serious financial crisis. On 23 January 2002, after years of economic mismanagement under the leadership of Peter Dragicevic as president, the club was declared bankrupt. A court judge named Juan Carlos Saffie as bankruptcy trustee and administrator responsible for the institution not lose its legal status. Despite the bankruptcy, under Jaime Pizarro as coach – key player in the obtaining of the 1991 Copa Libertadores – "Los Albos" won the Torneo de Clausura, with a playing squad composed almost completely of youth players. Three years later, in 2005, the joint-stock company Blanco y Negro took over the administration, acquiring all club assets for thirty years in exchange for paying all outstanding debts through a concessionaire and undergoing an opening process enlisting at the Santiago Stock Exchange. In the first half of 2006, the judiciary court lifted its bankruptcy.

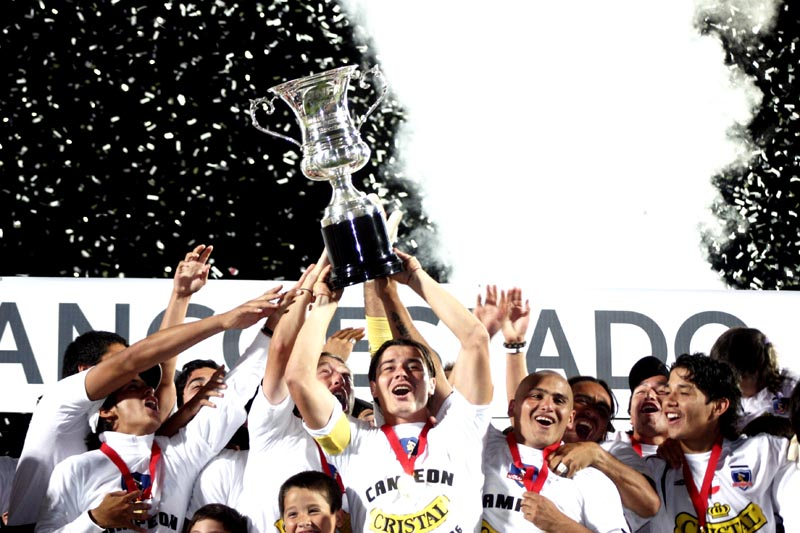
Colo-Colo squad celebrating the 2006 Torneo de Clausura obtaining.

With the Argentine Claudio Borghi appointed coach in 2006, and with players like Matías Fernández and Humberto Suazo, Colo-Colo played scintillating football and obtained the Bicampeonato winning the Apertura and Clausura tournaments. The squad reached another international final, the Copa Sudamericana, losing 2–1 to Mexico's Pachuca. That season, El Cacique was recognized in the month of October by the IFFHS as the world's club of the month. The following season Colo-Colo won two more consecutive tournaments, winning a Tetracampeonato for winning four back-to-back championships, being the first Chilean team to achieve the feat.

After Borghi's departure, the club obtained its 28th title defeating Palestino in the 2008 Torneo de Clausura finals under the coaching of Marcelo Barticciotto, and with Lucas Barrios as its top goal scorer, who equaled the goal tally record of Luis Hernán Álvarez scored by a Colo-Colo footballer during a single season with 37 goals. The following season, the club became the first professional team to play in Rapa Nui Easter Island. After a poor Torneo de Apertura 2009 – not reaching the play-offs for the first time – "Los Albos" started the Clausura or Closing Championship very poorly and languishing in the table standings in the relegation spots. The team however reached the tournament play-off finals against Universidad Católica, beating them 4–2 at the Santa Laura, with players like Esteban Paredes, Macnelly Torres and Ezequiel Miralles, coached by Hugo Tocalli. Colo-Colo's following championship was in 2014 after winning the Torneo de Clausura. It was the team's 30th Chilean League title.

== Badge, colours and kit ==
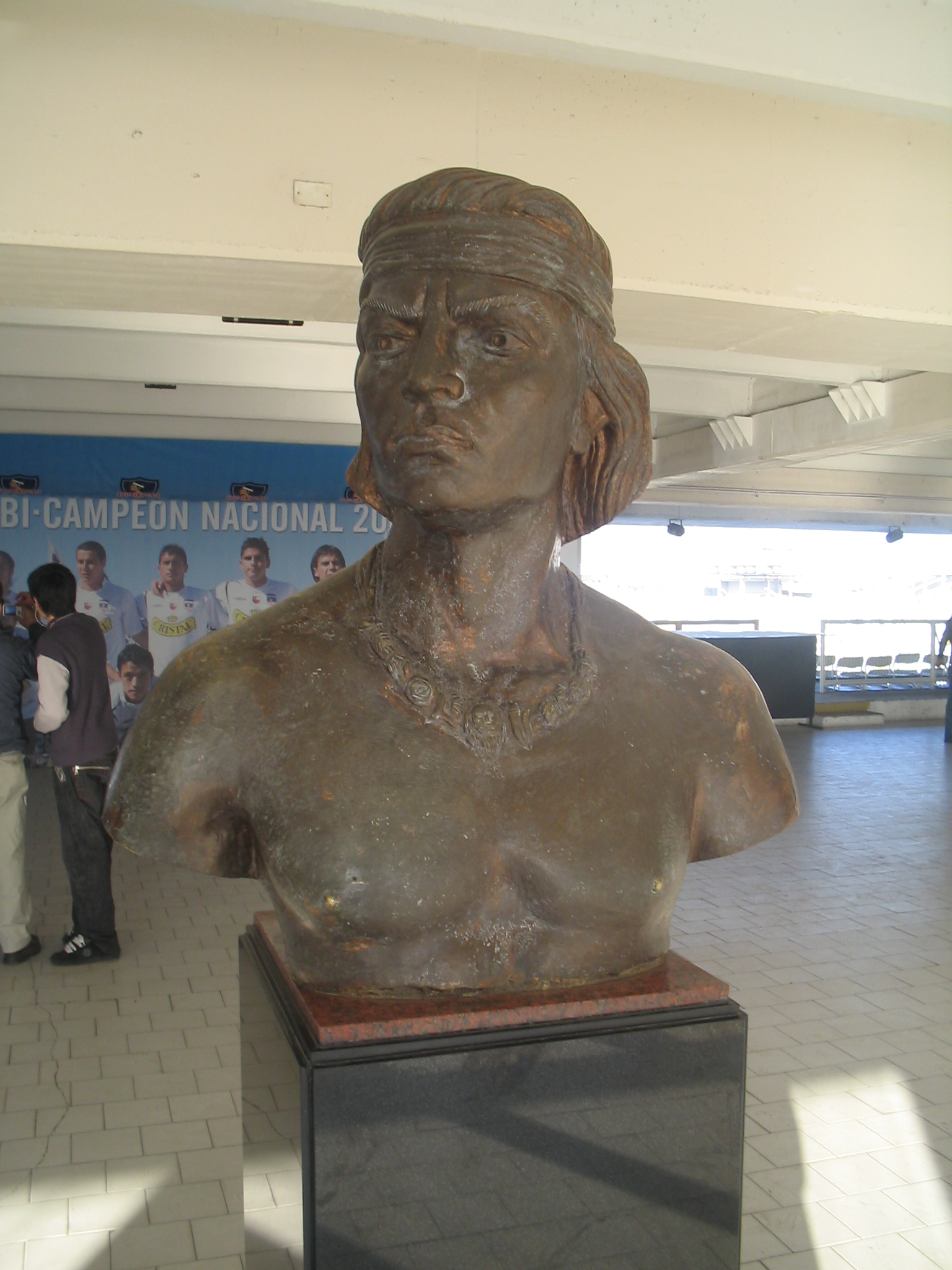
Colocolo bust at Estadio Monumental David Arellano

The club's badge represents Mapuche chieftain Colocolo, an important Wall Mapu member who fought in the Arauco War against the Spanish Empire (1536–1818). On 19 April 1925, when the club was established, Luis Contreras – one of the players that founded the club – defined the team's badge, in representation of the chief and the country's indigenous people.

Throughout its history, Colo-Colo's uniform has been a white shirt and black shorts. The uniform was originally designed by Juan Quiñones following the recommendations of David Arellano.

In 1927, after Arellano's death while playing against Real Unión Deportiva (currently Real Valladolid), it was decided then that the badge will wear a black horizontal band over it forever, to represent the institution's eternal mourning.

The team's away kits have varied through its history, from green between 1927 and the mid-1970s and to red from 1975 to 1988.

== Stadium ==
Colo-Colo initially played on a field called Estadio El Llano but in January 1928 moved to the Campos de Sports de Ñuñoa. The team later moved to Estadio Nacional where it played from 1939 to the late 1980s. In 1946 the club bought a stadium from Carabineros de Chile – then called Fortín Mapocho – which was closed according security reasons. It was intended to build a 30,000-seat stadium at the site. However, a municipal ordinance prohibited construction in the area. For that reason, Colo-Colo sold the stadium in order to raise funds for the future Estadio Monumental.

In 1956, club's president Antonio Labán acquired a 28 ha terrain at Macul, close to the intersection between Vicuña Mackenna and Departamental. The new stadium was originally planned with a capacity of 120,000. Due to the work's high cost and lack of a government subsidy the project was halted. In 1960, after Chile's successful proposition to hold the World Cup, several congressmen proposed to build a 52,000-seat stadium at Colo-Colo's site. However, the 9.5 Valdivia earthquake and a willingness from congress stopped the initiative.

Colo-Colo's brilliant campaigns in 1972 and 1973 allowed the stadium construction to resume. It was inaugurated in a league match 1975 which Colo-Colo win 1–0 over Deportes Aviación with Juan Carlos Orellana, who become the first player to score a goal in Monumental's history. However, the stadium was closed due to lack of basic services and infrastructure. It was not reopened until 1989 thanks to Hugo Rubio's transfer to Bologna which allowed the club to receive US$1 million to repair the problems mentioned. The stadium was called Monumental David Arellano in honour of its founder and its definitive inauguration was in a match against Uruguay's Peñarol which Colo-Colo won 2–1.

Since its definitive opening, the stadium has seen the 1991 Copa Libertadores and 1992 Copa Interamericana titles as well as several league honors.

Monumental's public record attendance was in 1992 for a derby match with Universidad de Chile which registered an attendance of 70,000 fans approximately. That record was closely followed in August 1993 during a 2–0 exhibition match win over Real Madrid with a 67,543 attendance. Several remodeling works and stricter security brought down the total capacity to 47,347.

The Chilean national team usually use the stadium for its games since 1997. The stadium was also used during the 2015 Copa América.

== Players ==
Current squad of Colo-Colo as of 3 August 2026 (edit)
Sources: Official Web Site

No.		Position	Player
1	CHI	GK	Fernando de Paul
2	CHI	DF	Jonathan Villagra
3	CHI	DF	Alonso Olguín
4	URU	DF	Joaquín Sosa (loan from Bologna)
5	CHI	MF	Felipe Méndez
6	CHI	MF	Tomás Alarcón
7	CHI	FW	Francisco Marchant
8	CHI	MF	Álvaro Madrid (loan from Everton)
9	ARG	FW	Javier Correa
10	ARG	FW	Lautaro Pastrán (loan from Belgrano)
11	CHI	FW	Marcos Bolados
12	CHI	GK	Eduardo Villanueva
13	CHI	DF	Matías Fernández
17	CHI	DF	Iván Román (loan from Atlético Mineiro)
19	ARG	FW	Maximiliano Romero (loan from Argentinos Juniors)

No.		Position	Player
20	URU	DF	Javier Méndez
21	CHI	DF	Erick Wiemberg
22	ARG	MF	Claudio Aquino
23	CHI	MF	Arturo Vidal (c)
24	CHI	FW	Leandro Hernández
25	CHI	GK	Gabriel Maureira
26	CHI	DF	Diego Ulloa
28	CHI	DF	Jeyson Rojas
29	CPV	GK	Vozinha
30	CHI	FW	Yastin Cuevas
32	CHI	FW	Vicente Martínez
34	CHI	MF	Rodrigo Catalán
39	CHI	DF	Bruno Torres
50	CHI	FW	Felipe Raipán

Manager: Fernando Ortiz

=== Other players under contract ===
Note: Flags indicate national team as defined under FIFA eligibility rules; some limited exceptions apply. Players may hold more than one non-FIFA nationality.

No. / Pos. / Nation / Player; — / DF / CHI / Miguel Toledo	No. / Pos. / Nation / Player; — / MF / CHI / Bastián Silva

=== Youth Academy ===
Note: Flags indicate national team as defined under FIFA eligibility rules; some limited exceptions apply. Players may hold more than one non-FIFA nationality.

No.	Pos.	Nation	Player
3	DF	CHI	Alonso Olguín
16	MF	CHI	Sebastián Vega
35	FW	CHI	Jerall Astudillo
36	MF	CHI	Matías Moya
38	DF	CHI	Agustín Silva
42	MF	CHI	Cristian Díaz
43	MF	CHI	Tomás Medina
51	FW	CHI	Pierre Allende
53	DF	CHI	Vicente Rivas

No.	Pos.	Nation	Player
54	FW	VEN	Gedeón Díaz
55	DF	CHI	Diego Acevedo
56	MF	VEN	Xavier Romero
58	FW	ARG	Nahuel Flores
—	GK	CHI	Maximiliano Muñoz
—	GK	CHI	Santiago Tapia
—	DF	CHI	Paolo Castro
—	FW	CHI	Benjamín Araya
—	FW	COL	Maikel Peña

=== Out on loan ===
Note: Flags indicate national team as defined under FIFA eligibility rules; some limited exceptions apply. Players may hold more than one non-FIFA nationality.

No.	Pos.	Nation	Player
—	GK	CHI	Brayan Cortés (at Argentinos Juniors)
—	GK	CHI	Julio Fierro (at Unión Española)
—	DF	CHI	Víctor Campos (at Cobresal)
—	DF	CHI	Bruno Gutiérrez (at Deportes La Serena)
—	DF	CHI	Daniel Gutiérrez (at Unión La Calera)
—	DF	CHI	Pedro Navarro (at Santiago Wanderers)
—	DF	CHI	Matías Pinto (at Deportes La Serena)
—	DF	CHI	Cristian Riquelme (at Deportes Concepción)
—	DF	CHI	Javier Rojas (at Deportes Limache)
—	DF	CHI	Nicolás Suárez (at Deportes Copiapó)
—	DF	CHI	Felipe Yáñez (at Magallanes)
—	MF	CHI	Bastián Arias (at Santiago City)

No.	Pos.	Nation	Player
—	MF	CHI	Ethan Espinoza (at Deportes Concepción)
—	MF	CHI	Dylan Portilla (at Santiago Wanderers)
—	MF	CHI	Bryan Soto (at Audax Italiano)
—	MF	CHI	Lucas Soto (at Everton)
—	MF	CHI	Milovan Velásquez (at Deportes La Serena)
—	FW	CHI	Cristian Alarcón (at Atlético Colina)
—	FW	CHI	Benjamín Castro (at Provincial Ovalle)
—	FW	HAI	Manley Clerveaux (at Provincial Osorno)
—	FW	CHI	Francisco Rivera (at Deportes Rengo)
—	FW	URU	Salomón Rodríguez (at Montevideo City Torque)
—	FW	CHI	Cristián Zavala (at Coquimbo Unido)

=== 2026 Winter transfers ===
==== In ====
Note: Flags indicate national team as defined under FIFA eligibility rules; some limited exceptions apply. Players may hold more than one non-FIFA nationality.

No. / Pos. / Nation / Player; 17 / DF / CHI / Iván Román (loan from Atlético Mineiro)	No. / Pos. / Nation / Player; 29 / GK / CPV / Vozinha (from Chaves)

==== Out ====
Note: Flags indicate national team as defined under FIFA eligibility rules; some limited exceptions apply. Players may hold more than one non-FIFA nationality.

No.	Pos.	Nation	Player
14	FW	CHI	Danilo Saavedra (to Universidad Católica)
17	DF	CHI	Cristian Riquelme (loan to Deportes Concepción)
29	DF	CHI	Víctor Campos (loan to Cobresal)

No.	Pos.	Nation	Player
—	GK	CHI	Juliano Méndez (to Santiago Wanderers)
—	FW	CHI	Gadiel Riveros (to Cosmopolitano)

== Managers ==
=== Current coaching staff ===
Position	Name
Coach	(Argentina) Fernando Ortiz
Assistant coach	(Argentina) Pablo Manusovich
Assistant coach	(Argentina) Pablo Ricchetti
Fitness coach	(Canada) Paolo Pacione
Goalkeeping coach	(Chile) Jorge Martínez

== Supporters and rivalries ==
Colo-Colo is the club with the largest following in Chile, with approximately 42% of the total Chilean football fans according to research published in August 2012 by Spanish newspaper agency Marca. The study showed a 4% growth in comparison to 2006 research by Fundación Futuro that ranked the club in first place with the 38% of the preferences, leaving its rival Universidad de Chile in second place.

The Chilean football club with the highest number of followers on social media as of June 2020 was Colo-Colo, with 4.2 million followers. Arch-rivals Club Universidad de Chile ranked second with 2.1 million followers on social networks.

Since the early 1960s, the club has had organized fan groups, which evolved in the mid-1980s into the so-called Garra Blanca. They attended Colo-Colo's games and generally rioted, especially in derbies, turning Estadio Monumental surroundings into battlefields against the military police. In 2000, the group was declared as Barra brava.

Colo-Colo contests rivalries with fellow Santiago clubs Universidad Católica dubbed Clásico Albo-Cruzado and Deportes Magallanes dubbed Clásico de la Chilenidad.

=== Chilean Superclásico ===
Colo-Colo's traditional rival is Universidad de Chile, against which it plays the Chilean Classic or Chilean Superclásico. Although the first confrontation between the two clubs dates back to 1935, the rivalry began to develop in the 1940s and 1950s, with the match played on 11 November 1959, being the climax of a series of disagreements between the two institutions. That match, valid for the definition of that year's title, ended with a 2–1 victory for Universidad de Chile, which was the first of a series of good results for the "Azules" over Colo-Colo. This, added to the dominance of Universidad de Chile in the national championship, only increased the rivalry. "

== Honors ==
Colo-Colo honours
Type	Competition	Titles	Seasons
National	Primera División	35	1937, 1939, 1941, 1944, 1947, 1953, 1956, 1960, 1963, 1970, 1972, 1979, 1981, 1983, 1986, 1989, 1990, 1991, 1993, 1996, 1997-C, 1998, 2002-C, 2006-A, 2006-C, 2007-A, 2007-C, 2008-C, 2009-C, 2014-C, 2015-A, 2017, 2022, 2024, 2026
National	Copa Chile	14	1958, 1974, 1981, 1982, 1985, 1988, 1989, 1990, 1994, 1996, 2016, 2019, 2021, 2023
National	Supercopa de Chile	4^{S}	2017, 2018, 2022, 2024
National	Campeonato de Campeones	1	1945
National	Campeonato de Apertura	3^{S}	1933, 1938, 1940
National	Campeonato Nacional de Football	1	1936
National	Campeonato Absoluto de Chile	1^{S}	1937
International	Copa Libertadores	1	1991
International	Recopa Sudamericana	1	1992
International	Copa Interamericana	1	1992

- record
- ^{S} shared record

=== Regional ===
- División de Honor de la Liga Metropolitana de Deportes
  - Winners (1): 1925
- Primera División de la Liga Central de Football de Santiago
  - Winners (2): Serie F 1928, 1929
- División de Honor de la Asociación de Football de Santiago
  - Winners (1): 1930
- Copa de Campeones de Santiago
  - Winners (1): 1925

== See also ==
- Colo-Colo B
- Colo-Colo (women)
