= Matías Colossi =

Chilean footballer

Personal information
- Full name: Matías Vicente Colossi Pastén
- Date of birth: 31 May 2001 (age 25)
- Place of birth: Providencia, Santiago, Chile
- Height: 1.80 m (5 ft 11 in)
- Position: Winger

Team information
- Current team: Atlético Colina
- Number: 31

Youth career
- Colo-Colo

Senior career*
| Years | Team | Apps | (Gls) |
| 2019–2024 | Colo-Colo | 0 | (0) |
| 2021 | → Deportes Melipilla (loan) | 7 | (0) |
| 2022 | → Barnechea (loan) | 31 | (6) |
| 2023 | → Deportes Puerto Montt (loan) | 13 | (1) |
| 2024 | → Barnechea (loan) | 6 | (0) |
| 2025– | Atlético Colina | 28 | (16) |
- * Club domestic league appearances and goals as of 31 December 2025

Matías Vicente Colossi Pastén (born 31 May 2001) is a Chilean footballer who plays as a winger for Atlético Colina.

== Club career ==
A product of Chilean giant Colo-Colo, Colossi was promoted to the first team in 2019 under Mario Salas. He was sent on loan to Deportes Melipilla in the Chilean Primera División for the 2021 season. The next seasons, he was loaned out to Barnechea twice in 2022 and 2024 and Deportes Puerto Montt in 2023.

Ended his contract with Colo-Colo in December 2024, Colossi signed with Atlético Colina and won the 2025 Tercera A scoring 16 goals. He continued with them for the 2026 season.
