= Camilo Ponce Enríquez =

Camilo Ponce Enríquez or Camilo Ponce may refer to:

- Camilo Ponce Enríquez (politician) (1912–1976), Ecuadorian politician
- Camilo Ponce (footballer) (born 1991), Chilean footballer
- Camilo Ponce Enríquez Canton, in Azuay province, Ecuador
  - Camilo Ponce Enríquez (parish)
- Ciudad de Catamayo Airport, formerly Camilo Ponce Enriquez Airport, in Loja, Ecuador
