= Fernando Gutiérrez (footballer) =

Chilean footballer and manager (born 1980)

Personal information
- Full name: Fernando Antonio Gutiérrez Fernández
- Date of birth: 4 December 1980 (age 45)
- Place of birth: Santiago, Chile
- Height: 1.77 m (5 ft 9 1/2 in)
- Position: Centre back

Team information
- Current team: Trasandino (manager)

Youth career
- Audax Italiano

Senior career*
Years	Team	Apps	(Gls)
1999–2010	Audax Italiano	113	(3)
2007–2008	→ Unión Española (loan)	34	(1)
2011	Curicó Unido	33	(3)
2012	Barnechea	30	(1)
Total		210	(8)

Managerial career
- 2014: Huachipato (assistant)
- 2015–2017: Universidad Católica (assistant)
- 2017–2018: Sporting Cristal (assistant)
- 2019–2020: Colo-Colo (assistant)
- 2020: Alianza Lima (assistant)
- 2021: Wadi Degla (assistant)
- 2021: Deportes Colina
- 2022: Iberia
- 2023–2024: Deportes Colina
- 2025: San Antonio Unido
- 2026–: Trasandino
- * Club domestic league appearances and goals

Fernando Antonio Gutiérrez Fernández (born 4 December 1980) is a Chilean former professional footballer and manager. He is currently in charge of Trasandino.

== Managerial career ==
From 2014 to 2021 Gutiérrez worked as the assistant coach of Mario Salas in several clubs, even managing Colo-Colo in the 2019 Copa Chile. In September 2021, he took the challenge of managing to Deportes Colina in the Segunda División Profesional de Chile.

In April 2025, Gutiérrez was appointed manager of San Antonio Unido. The next year, he switched to Trasandino.
