= 2026 Segunda División Profesional de Chile =

Segunda División Profesional de Chile
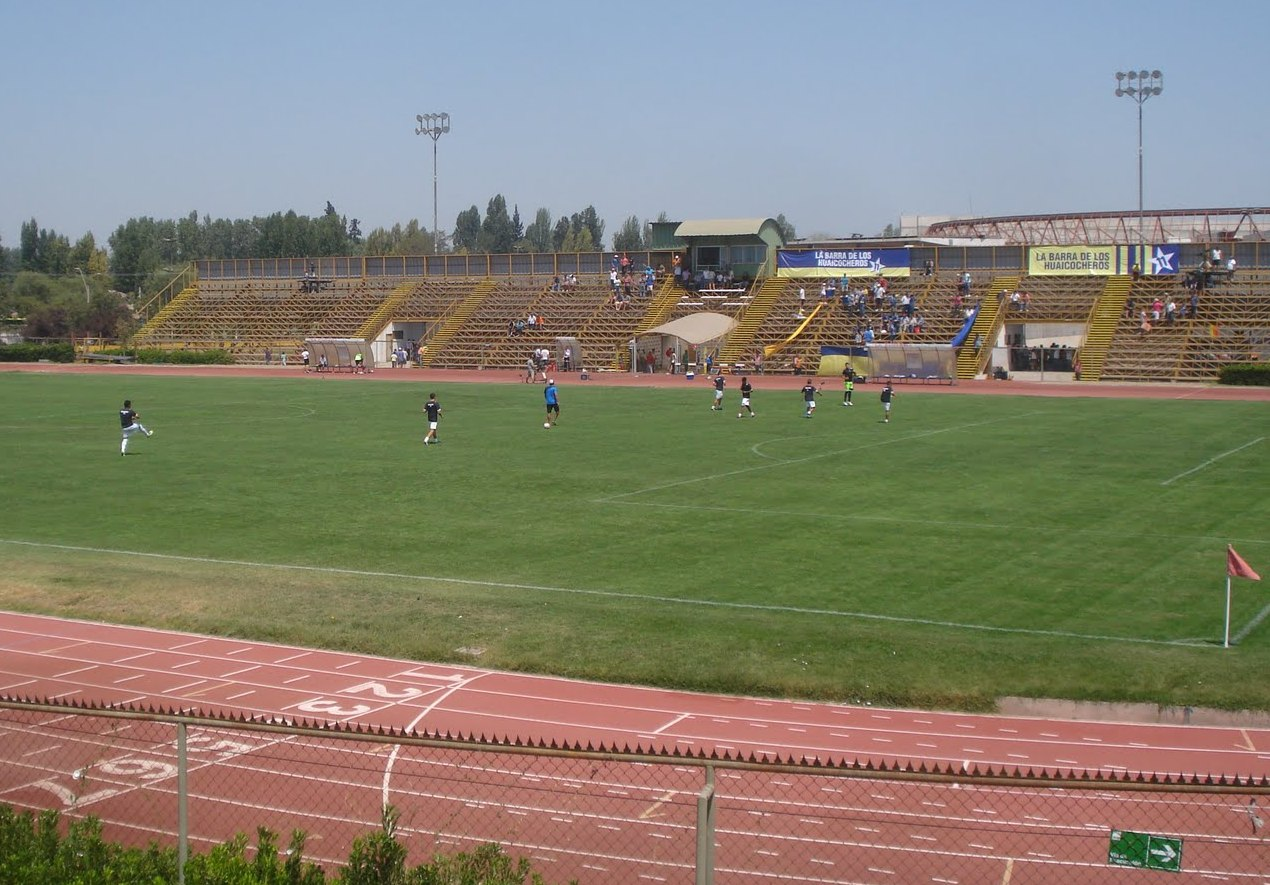
- The La Pintana Municipal Stadium is set to host Segunda División Profesional matches again after Santiago Morning's relegation to the division.
- Season: 2026
- Dates: 21 March – 1 December 2026
- Matches: 59

The 2026 Segunda División Profesional de Chile (also referred to in Spanish as the Liga Segunda División) is scheduled to be the 16th season of Chile's third-tier professional football league, organized by the ANFP.

== Overview ==
Santiago Morning are expected to compete in the division following confirmation of their relegation from the Primera B after the Court of Arbitration for Sport (CAS) upheld the points deduction that determined their final standing.

The season is also set to feature the return of Atlético Colina to the professional leagues as champions of the Tercera División A and the return of Colchagua after winning the promotion play-off for the second spot available to ANFA clubs.

== Competition format ==
According to reporting on the ANFP-approved changes for 2026, the competition is expected to keep the traditional double round-robin format (two rounds, everyone plays everyone), with the season start pushed to late March.

- Three points are awarded for a win, one for a draw, and none for a loss.
- The champions are promoted to the Primera B.
- The bottom teams are relegated to the Tercera División A.

== Teams ==
=== Team changes ===
Promoted to Segunda División Profesional

- Atlético Colina (champions of Tercera División A 2025)
- Colchagua (promotion play-off winners, second ANFA promotion place)
- TBD (ANFA third promotion place)

Relegated to Segunda División Profesional

- Santiago Morning (from Primera B)

Relegated from Segunda División Profesional

- Deportes Melipilla (to Tercera División A)
- San Antonio Unido (to Tercera División A)

=== Participating teams ===
The following teams are expected to participate in the 2026 season:

Team	City	Region
Atlético Colina	Santiago (Colina)	Metropolitan
Brujas de Salamanca	Salamanca	Coquimbo
Colchagua	San Fernando	O'Higgins
Concón National	Concón	Valparaíso
Deportes Linares	Linares	Maule
Deportes Rengo	Rengo	O'Higgins
General Velásquez	San Vicente de Tagua Tagua	O'Higgins
Lota Schwager	Coronel	Biobío
Provincial Osorno	Osorno	Los Lagos
Provincial Ovalle	Ovalle	Coquimbo
Real San Joaquín	Santiago (San Joaquín)	Metropolitan
Santiago City	Santiago (Las Condes)	Metropolitan
Santiago Morning	Santiago (La Pintana)	Metropolitan
Trasandino	Los Andes	Valparaíso

== League standings ==
=== North Zone ===
Pos	Team	Pld	W	D	L	GF	GA	GD	Pts	Qualification
1	Brujas de Salamanca	12	5	7	0	11	5	+6	22	Advance to Promotion Liguilla
2	Concón National	12	6	3	3	16	10	+6	21	Advance to Promotion Liguilla
3	Santiago City	12	5	5	2	18	19	−1	20	Advance to Promotion Liguilla
4	Trasandino	12	5	3	4	19	17	+2	18	Advance to Zonal play-off
5	Real San Joaquín	12	3	4	5	16	17	−1	13	Advance to Relegation Liguilla
6	Atlético Colina	12	3	3	6	15	14	+1	12	Advance to Relegation Liguilla
7	Provincial Ovalle	12	1	3	8	11	24	−13	6	Advance to Relegation Liguilla

Updated to match(es) played on 12 July 2026. Source:
Rules for classification: 1) Points; 2) Goal difference; 3) Number of wins; 4) Goals scored; 5) Away goals scored; 6) Fewest red cards; 7) Fewest yellow cards; 8) Draw [citation:4].

=== South Zone ===
Pos	Team	Pld	W	D	L	GF	GA	GD	Pts	Qualification
1	Provincial Osorno	12	6	6	0	15	5	+10	24	Advance to Promotion Liguilla
2	Colchagua	12	6	4	2	15	11	+4	22	Advance to Promotion Liguilla
3	Deportes Linares	12	6	1	5	16	12	+4	19	Advance to Promotion Liguilla
4	General Velásquez	12	5	1	6	11	15	−4	16	Advance to Zonal play-off
5	Lota Schwager	12	3	4	5	11	13	−2	13	Advance to Relegation Liguilla
6	Deportes Rengo	12	3	2	7	10	17	−7	11	Advance to Relegation Liguilla
7	Santiago Morning	12	2	4	6	9	14	−5	10	Advance to Relegation Liguilla

Updated to match(es) played on 12 July 2026. Source:
Rules for classification: 1) Points; 2) Goal difference; 3) Number of wins; 4) Goals scored; 5) Away goals scored; 6) Fewest red cards; 7) Fewest yellow cards; 8) Draw [citation:4].

=== Promotion Liguilla ===
Pos	Team	Pld	W	D	L	GF	GA	GD	Pts	Qualification
1	Deportes Linares	9	5	1	3	12	12	0	16	Promotion to Liga de Ascenso
2	Trasandino	8	3	3	2	17	12	+5	12	
3	Santiago City	8	3	3	2	12	9	+3	12	
4	Provincial Osorno	8	3	1	4	9	10	−1	10	
5	Brujas de Salamanca	6	3	1	2	7	8	−1	10	
6	Concón National	8	3	0	5	9	14	−5	9	
7	Colchagua	7	2	1	4	5	6	−1	7	

Updated to match(es) played on 29 October 2026. Source:
Rules for classification: 1) Points; 2) Goal difference; 3) Number of wins; 4) Goals scored; 5) Away goals scored; 6) Fewest red cards; 7) Fewest yellow cards; 8) Draw [citation:4].

=== Relegation Liguilla ===
Pos	Team	Pld	W	D	L	GF	GA	GD	Pts	Qualification
1	Deportes Rengo	8	5	2	1	18	12	+6	17	
2	Lota Schwager	8	4	2	2	14	7	+7	14	
3	Santiago Morning	8	1	6	1	9	9	0	9	
4	General Velásquez	8	2	3	3	9	11	−2	9	
5	Atlético Colina	8	2	2	4	7	9	−2	8	
6	Provincial Ovalle	7	2	2	3	6	10	−4	8	Relegation to Tercera División A
7	Real San Joaquín	7	1	3	3	8	13	−5	6	Relegation to Tercera División A

Updated to match(es) played on 30 October 2026. Source:
Rules for classification: 1) Points; 2) Goal difference; 3) Number of wins; 4) Goals scored; 5) Away goals scored; 6) Fewest red cards; 7) Fewest yellow cards; 8) Draw [citation:4].

== See also ==
- 2026 Chilean Primera División
- 2026 Primera B de Chile
- 2026 Copa Chile
