= 1982 Campeonato Nacional Segunda División =

Segunda División
- Season: 1982
- Champions: Arturo Fernández Vial
- Promoted: Arturo Fernández Vial; Everton; Trasandino; Unión San Felipe; Deportes Antofagasta; Santiago Wanderers
- Relegated: Talagante Ferrone
- Top goalscorer: Caupolicán Escobar (24 goals); Trasandino

The 1982 Segunda División de Chile was the 31st season of the Segunda División de Chile.

Arturo Fernández Vial was the tournament's champion.

== Table ==
Pos	Team	Pld	W	D	L	GF	GA	GD	Pts	Promotion or relegation
1	Arturo Fernández Vial	42	21	14	7	66	43	+23	56	Champions. Promoted to 1983 Primera División de Chile
2	Everton (P)	42	20	13	9	62	42	+20	55 (Note: Awarded 2 bonus points)	Promoted to 1983 Primera División de Chile
3	Trasandino (P)	42	22	9	11	68	47	+21	54 (Note: Awarded 1 bonus point)	Promoted to 1983 Primera División de Chile
4	Unión San Felipe (P)	42	23	8	11	54	46	+8	54	Promoted to 1983 Primera División de Chile
5	Deportes Antofagasta (P)	42	22	9	11	68	35	+33	53	Promoted to 1983 Primera División de Chile
6	Cobresal	42	19	14	9	72	41	+31	53	Qualified for 1981 Primera División de Chile promotion/relegation playoffs
7	Unión La Calera	42	19	15	8	75	48	+27	53	Qualified for 1981 Primera División de Chile promotion/relegation playoffs
8	San Antonio Unido	42	19	14	9	48	29	+19	52	
9	San Luis de Quillota	42	20	8	14	58	43	+15	48	
10	Coquimbo Unido	42	15	15	12	51	42	+9	45	
11	Deportes Concepción	42	15	13	14	52	47	+5	43	
12	Santiago Wanderers (P)	42	15	12	15	49	53	−4	42	Promoted to 1983 Primera División de Chile
13	Lota Schwager	42	13	15	14	48	61	−13	41	
14	Ñublense	42	9	20	13	39	46	−7	38	
15	Green Cross-Temuco	42	12	12	18	59	73	−14	36	
16	Colchagua	42	11	10	21	51	70	−19	33	
17	Deportes Ovalle	42	13	7	22	29	48	−19	33	
18	Deportes Linares	42	9	13	20	49	65	−16	31	
19	Iberia Biobío	42	6	17	19	42	69	−27	29	
20	Huachipato	42	7	14	21	36	66	−30	28	
21	Malleco Unido	42	8	10	24	32	62	−30	26	
22	Talagante Ferro (R)	42	11	4	27	52	84	−32	26	Relegated to 1983 Tercera División de Chile

Source: rsssf.com
(P) Promoted; (R) Relegated

== See also ==
- Chilean football league system
