= Adolfo Esparza =

Chilean footballer

Personal information
- Full name: Adolfo Alejandro Esparza Tapia
- Date of birth: 22 August 1969 (age 57)
- Place of birth: Santiago, Chile
- Position: Forward

Youth career
- Universidad Católica

Senior career*
Years	Team	Apps	(Gls)
1989	Universidad Católica	2	(1)
1989	→ Municipal Las Condes (loan)	–	(–)
1990	Deportes Iquique	22	(3)
1991	Cobresal	19	(4)
1992	Rangers		(6)
1993–1996	Coquimbo Unido	77	(8)
1997	O'Higgins		(3)
1998	Everton		(1)
1999	Deportes Linares		(1)
2000	Provincial Osorno	4	(0)

International career
1988	Chile U20		
- * Club domestic league appearances and goals

Adolfo Alejandro Esparza Tapia (born 22 August 1969) is a Chilean former footballer who played as a forward.

== Club career ==
A product of Universidad Católica youth system, Esparza made his debut in the 1989 season. He was loaned out to Municipal Las Condes in the Tercera División the same year. In the Chilean Primera División, he also played for Deportes Iquique (1990), Cobresal (1991), Coquimbo Unido (1993–1996) and Provincial Osorno (2000).

In the second level, he played for Rangers de Talca (1992), O'Higgins (1997), Everton (1998) and Deportes Linares (1999).

Esparza also had a stint abroad in the French football.

== International career ==
Esparza represented Chile at under-20 level in the 1988 South American Championship.

== Personal life ==
Esparza graduated as a child care technician thanks to a program from the Integra Foundation, a Chilean state institution. He has served as driver of Jardín Sobre Ruedas (Kindergarten On Wheels) in the O'Higgins Region, a programme that provides education to children who lives far away from cities. Prior to this, he got a degree in sports coaching at AIEP Institute.

In football, he has worked as coach for the football academy of Universidad Católica based in Coltauco, O'Higgins Region.
