= Joaquín Aros =

Chilean footballer (born 1996)

Personal information
- Full name: Joaquín Esteban Aros Melgarejo
- Date of birth: 23 January 1996 (age 30)
- Place of birth: Talcahuano, Chile
- Height: 1.80 m (5 ft 11 in)
- Position: Defender

Team information
- Current team: Deportes Linares

Youth career
- Deportes Temuco

Senior career*
Years	Team	Apps	(Gls)
2014–2020	Deportes Temuco	91	(4)
2021–2022	Deportes Santa Cruz	49	(2)
2023	Deportes Iquique	3	(0)
2024	Trasandino	22	(1)
2025	Deportes Linares	22	(1)
2026	Brujas de Salamanca	5	(0)
2026–	Deportes Linares	0	(0)
- * Club domestic league appearances and goals as of 8 August 2026

Joaquín Esteban Aros Melgarejo (born 23 January 1996) is a Chilean footballer who plays for Deportes Linares in the Segunda División Profesional de Chile.

== Career ==
Aros joined Brujas de Salamanca in February 2026. He switched to Deportes Linares for the second half of the year.

== Personal life ==
Joaquín is the son of the former Chile international footballer Mauricio Aros. He is not the brother of the also footballer Vicente Aros, who has frequently been related to his father.
