= Jorge Guzmán (footballer, born 1980) =

Chilean footballer

Personal information
- Full name: Jorge Cristóbal Guzmán Pizarro
- Date of birth: 24 March 1980 (age 46)
- Place of birth: Santiago, Chile
- Position: Forward

Youth career
- Universidad de Chile

Senior career*
Years	Team	Apps	(Gls)
1997–2002	Universidad de Chile	28	(3)
2001	→ Deportes Temuco (loan)	30	(19)
2002	Coquimbo Unido	15	(1)
2003	Santiago Wanderers	13	(4)
2003	Audax Italiano	16	(4)
2004	Deportes Temuco	21	(3)
2005	Provincial Osorno	27	(11)
2006	Deportes Melipilla	16	(4)

International career
1997	Chile U17		

Managerial career
- 2011: Sportverein Jugendland
- 2012: Ferroviarios
- 2013: Sportverein Jugendland
- 2014–2015: Lautaro de Buin
- 2015: Barnechea (assistant)
- 2016: AC Colina
- 2017: Deportes Limache
- 2018: Provincial Ovalle
- Lautaro de Buin (youth)
- 2026–: Caracas (assistant)
- * Club domestic league appearances and goals

Jorge Cristóbal Guzmán Pizarro (born 24 March 1980) is a Chilean former footballer who played as a forward.

== Club career ==
A product of Universidad de Chile, Guzmán made his professional debut in 1997. Later, he played for Coquimbo Unido, Santiago Wanderers, Audax Italiano and Deportes Temuco in the Chilean Primera División.

As a member of Universidad de Chile, Guzmán won league titles in 1999 and 2000 and the Copa Chile in 1998 and 2000.

In the Chilean second level, Guzmán played for Deportes Temuco, Provincial Osorno and Deportes Melipilla. He won the 2001 Primera B with Deportes Temuco, becoming the top goalscorer with 19 goals.

== International career ==
Guzmán represented Chile at under-17 level in the 1997 South American Championship and the 1997 FIFA World Cup.

== Coaching career ==
Guzmán led clubs at minor categories of Chilean football such as Ferroviarios, Athletic Club Colina, Deportes Limache, Provincial Ovalle, among others. In addition, he served as assistant coach of Francisco Bozán for Barnechea in 2015 and coached the Lautaro de Buin youth ranks.

In June 2026, Guzmán assumed as an assistant coach for Venezuelan club Caracas.

== Personal life ==
He is nicknamed Maravilla (Wonder).

His brother, Juan Pablo, is also a football manager.
