= Julio Bórquez =

Chilean footballer (born 2000)

Junior Bórquez
Personal information
- Full name: Julio Junior Bórquez Hernández
- Date of birth: 20 April 2000 (age 26)
- Place of birth: Iquique, Chile
- Height: 1.80 m (5 ft 11 in)
- Position: Goalkeeper

Team information
- Current team: Atlético Colina
- Number: 20

Senior career*
| Years | Team | Apps | (Gls) |
| 2018–2020 | Deportes Iquique | 1 | (0) |
| 2021 | Deportes Colina | 14 | (0) |
| 2022 | Lota Schwager | – | (–) |
| 2023 | Deportes Colina | – | (–) |
| 2024 | Brujas de Salamanca | – | (–) |
| 2025– | Atlético Colina | – | (–) |

International career^{‡}
| 2013 | Chile U17 | 13 | (0) |
| 2018–2019 | Chile U20 | | |
Medal record
Men's football
Representing Chile
South American Games
| Gold medal – first place | 2018 Cochabamba |
- * Club domestic league appearances and goals as of 22 July 2022 ‡ National team caps and goals as of 25 January 2019

Julio Junior Bórquez Hernández (born 20 April 2000), also known as Junior Bórquez, is a Chilean footballer who plays as a goalkeeper for Chilean Tercera A side Atlético Colina.

== Club career ==
A product of Deportes Iquique, in 2021 he played for Chilean Segunda División side Deportes Colina. In 2022 he moved to Tercera A side Lota Schwager.

=== Controversies ===
In April 2020, he was suspended from the football activity, along with his teammate Luis Sotomayor, due to doping by furosemide, a substance found in a sample taken in February 2020. After this situation, Deportes Iquique released him in January 2021.

== International career ==
He has represented Chile U17 in a friendly match against USA U17, at the 2017 South American U-17 Championship – Chile was the runner-up – and at the 2017 FIFA U-17 World Cup. Also, he played all the matches for Chile U17 at the friendly tournament Lafarge Foot Avenir 2017 in France, better known as Tournament Limoges, where Chile became champion after defeating Belgium U18 and Poland U18 and drawing France U18.

He was in the Chile U20 squad for both the 2019 South American U-20 Championship and the 2018 South American Games, winning the gold medal,

== Honours ==
Chile U17

- Tournoi de Limoges: 2017

Chile U20

- South American Games Gold medal: 2018

Individual

- Sports Journalists Circle of Chile (CPD) Best Amateur Footballer of the Year: 2025
