= Alejandro Contreras =

Chilean footballer (born 1993)

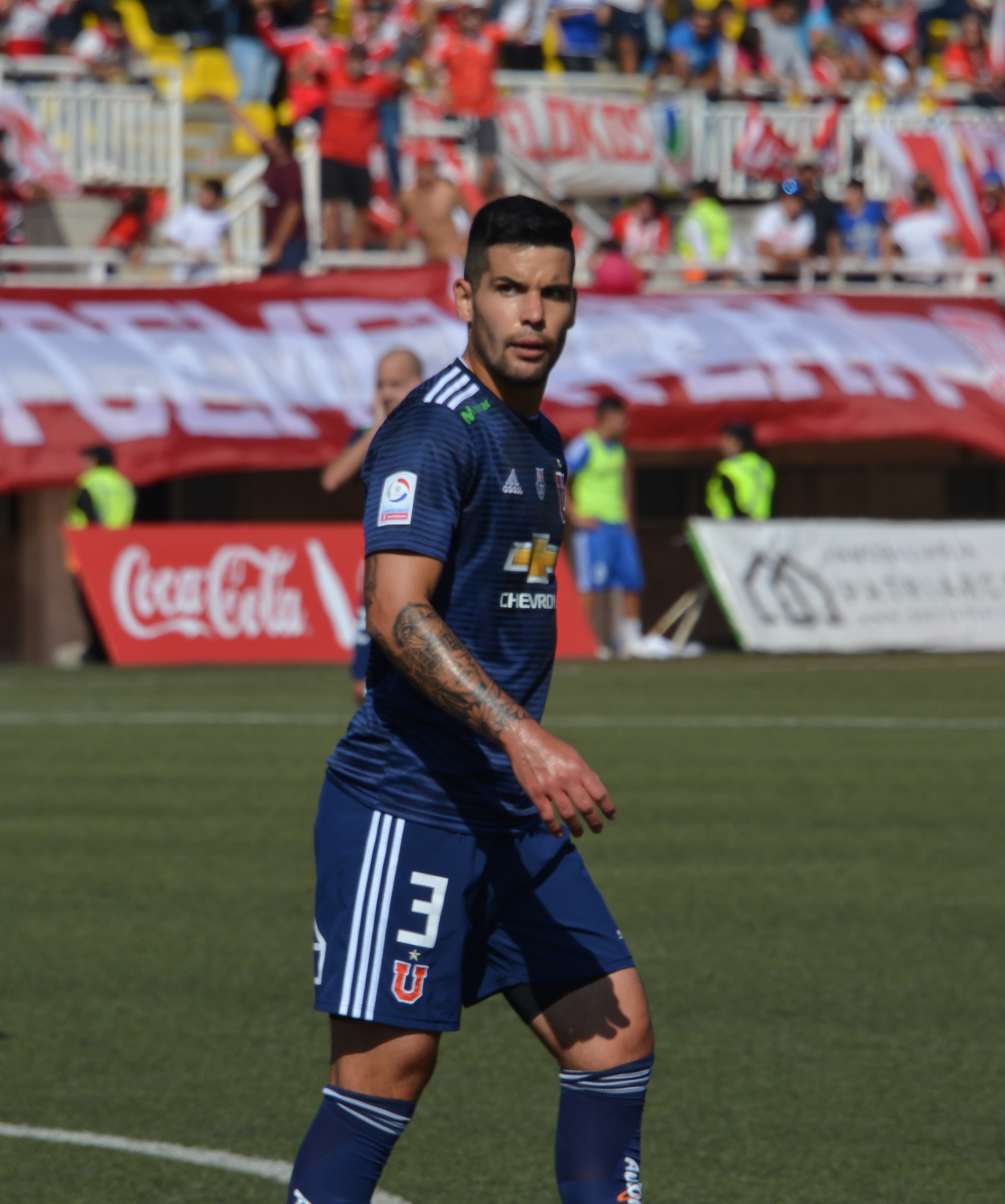
- Contreras with Universidad de Chile in 2018

Personal information
- Full name: Alejandro Andrés Contreras Daza
- Date of birth: 3 March 1993 (age 33)
- Place of birth: Santiago, Chile
- Height: 1.84 m (6 ft 0 in)
- Position: Defender

Team information
- Current team: Atlético Colina
- Number: 5

Youth career
- 2008–2012: Palestino

Senior career*
Years	Team	Apps	(Gls)
2012–2016	Palestino	80	(4)
2016–2019	Universidad de Chile	38	(3)
2019	→ O'Higgins (loan)	8	(1)
2020	Deportes Iquique	14	(0)
2021	Santiago Morning	31	(1)
2022	Deportes Temuco	18	(0)
2023	Santiago Morning	15	(2)
2024	Nueva Chicago	8	(0)
2025	San Marcos	16	(0)
2026–	Atlético Colina	1	(0)

International career^{‡}
2013	Chile U20	3	(1)
- * Club domestic league appearances and goals as of 5 April 2026 ‡ National team caps and goals as of 29 June 2013

Alejandro Andrés Contreras Daza (born 3 March 1993) is a Chilean footballer who plays as a defender for Atlético Colina.

== Club career ==
Contreras began his career playing for the Palestino youth team and was part of the squad that won the 2012 U-20 national championship. He made his debut in the Chilean Primera División on 31 March 2013 scoring against Deportes Antofagasta.

In 2024, he moved abroad by first time in his career and signed with Primera Nacional side Nueva Chicago.

Back in Chile, Contreras joined San Marcos de Arica for the 2025 season.

In March 2026, Contreras joined Atlético Colina in the Segunda División Profesional de Chile.

== International career ==
Contreras was selected to play for the Chile national under-20 football team in the 2013 South American Youth Championship by team manager Mario Salas. Success in this tournament took Contreras and the team to the 2013 FIFA U-20 World Cup.
