= 1985 Campeonato Nacional Segunda División =

Segunda División
- Season: 1985
- Champions: Trasandino
- Promoted: Trasandino; Arturo Fernández Vial
- Relegated: Deportes Victoria; Super Lo Miranda; Santiago Morning

The 1985 Segunda División de Chile was the 34th season of the Segunda División de Chile.

Trasandino was the tournament's champion.

== Final table ==
=== North Zone ===
Pos	Team	Pld	W	D	L	GF	GA	GD	Pts	Qualification
1	Trasandino	18	9	7	2	25	11	+14	25	Qualified to Promotion Playoffs - North Zone
2	Deportes Antofagasta	18	9	3	6	30	21	+9	21	Qualified to Promotion Playoffs - North Zone
3	Unión Santa Cruz	18	7	6	5	22	25	−3	20	Qualified to Promotion Playoffs - North Zone
4	Deportes La Serena	18	6	7	5	14	18	−4	19	Qualified to Promotion Playoffs - North Zone
5	Santiago Wanderers	18	5	8	5	23	19	+4	18	Qualified to Promotion Playoffs - North Zone
6	Coquimbo Unido	18	6	6	6	18	18	0	18	Qualified to Relegation Playoffs - North Zone
7	Deportes Ovalle	18	4	9	5	21	18	+3	17	Qualified to Relegation Playoffs - North Zone
8	Quintero Unido	18	4	8	6	16	21	−5	16	Qualified to Relegation Playoffs - North Zone
9	Super Lo Miranda	18	4	6	8	17	28	−11	14	Qualified to Relegation Playoffs - North Zone
10	Regional Atacama	18	3	6	9	16	23	−7	12	Qualified to Relegation Playoffs - North Zone

Source: globalsportsarchive.com

=== South Zone ===
Pos	Team	Pld	W	D	L	GF	GA	GD	Pts	Qualification
1	Fernández Vial	18	10	6	2	26	11	+15	26	Qualified to Promotion Playoffs - South Zone
2	Lota Schwager	18	8	5	5	20	14	+6	21	Qualified to Promotion Playoffs - South Zone
3	Curicó Unido	18	9	3	6	24	23	+1	21	Qualified to Promotion Playoffs - South Zone
4	Provincial Osorno	18	6	6	6	28	27	+1	18	Qualified to Promotion Playoffs - South Zone
5	Malleco Unido	18	4	9	5	14	17	−3	17	Qualified to Promotion Playoffs - South Zone
6	Linares Unido	18	7	2	9	20	21	−1	16	Qualified to Relegation Playoffs - South Zone
7	Deportes Puerto Montt	18	5	6	7	16	20	−4	16	Qualified to Relegation Playoffs - South Zone
8	Deportes Valdivia	18	5	6	7	14	21	−7	16	Qualified to Relegation Playoffs - South Zone
9	Deportes Iberia	18	3	9	6	17	17	0	15	Qualified to Relegation Playoffs - South Zone
10	Deportes Victoria	18	4	6	8	14	22	−8	14	Qualified to Relegation Playoffs - South Zone

Source: globalsportsarchive.com

=== Promotion Playoffs - North Zone ===
Pos	Team	Pld	W	D	L	GF	GA	GD	Pts	Promotion
1	Trasandino	26	11	12	3	32	15	+17	34	Promoted to 1986 Primera División de Chile
2	Unión Santa Cruz	26	10	10	6	31	31	0	30	
3	Deportes Antofagasta	26	12	4	10	43	30	+13	28	
4	Santiago Wanderers	26	9	10	7	29	25	+4	28	
5	Deportes La Serena	26	7	9	10	16	29	−13	23	

Source: globalsportsarchive.com

=== Relegation Playoffs - North Zone ===
Pos	Team	Pld	W	D	L	GF	GA	GD	Pts	Relegation
6	Coquimbo Unido	26	7	11	8	23	25	−2	25	
7	Quintero Unido	26	7	11	8	22	26	−4	25	
8	Regional Atacama	26	7	10	9	24	24	0	24	
9	Deportes Ovalle	26	4	15	7	26	27	−1	23	
10	Super Lo Miranda	26	5	10	11	25	29	−4	20	Relegated to 1986 Tercera División de Chile

Source: globalsportsarchive.com

=== Promotion Playoffs - South Zone ===
Pos	Team	Pld	W	D	L	GF	GA	GD	Pts	Promotion
1	Fernández Vial	26	12	11	3	34	16	+18	35	Promoted to 1986 Primera División de Chile
2	Lota Schwager	26	10	9	7	28	22	+6	29	
3	Malleco Unido	26	9	11	6	27	25	+2	29	
4	Curicó Unido	26	10	6	10	29	31	−2	26	
5	Provincial Osorno	26	8	8	10	36	40	−4	24	

Source: globalsportsarchive.com

=== Relegation Playoffs - South Zone ===
Pos	Team	Pld	W	D	L	GF	GA	GD	Pts	Relegation
6	Deportes Valdivia	26	10	6	10	27	28	−1	26	
7	Deportes Linares	26	11	3	12	30	32	−2	25	
8	Iberia	26	6	12	8	26	26	0	24	
9	Deportes Puerto Montt	26	8	7	11	21	27	−6	23	
10	Deportes Victoria	26	6	7	13	22	33	−11	19	Relegated to 1986 Tercera División de Chile

Source: globalsportsarchive.com

== See also ==
- Chilean football league system
