= Mario Larenas =

Chilean footballer (born 1994)

Personal information
- Full name: Mario Ignacio Larenas Díaz
- Date of birth: 27 June 1994 (age 32)
- Place of birth: Santiago, Chile
- Height: 1.82 m (6 ft 0 in)
- Position: Left-back

Team information
- Current team: Atlético Colina

Youth career
- 2007–2012: Unión Española

Senior career*
Years	Team	Apps	(Gls)
2013–2023	Unión Española	99	(1)
2018	→ Cobreloa (loan)	22	(0)
2023–2025	Deportes Antofagasta	63	(0)
2026–	Atlético Colina	0	(0)

International career
2012–2013	Chile U20	4	(0)
- * Club domestic league appearances and goals as of 2 December 2025

Mario Ignacio Larenas Díaz (born 27 June 1994) is a Chilean footballer who plays as a left-back for Atlético Colina.

== Career ==
In 2023, Larenas signed with Deportes Antofagasta. He left them at the end of the 2025 season.

In March 2026, Larenas joined Atlético Colina in the Segunda División Profesional de Chile.
