= Abraham Gómez =

Chilean footballer (born 1988)

Personal information
- Full name: Abraham Humberto Gómez Rodríguez
- Date of birth: 11 December 1988 (age 37)
- Place of birth: Talca, Chile
- Height: 1.77 m (5 ft 10 in)
- Position: Defender

Senior career*
| Years | Team | Apps | (Gls) |
| 2009–2012 | Rangers | 27 | (2) |
| 2013 | Lota Schwager | 10 | (0) |
| 2013–2014 | Puerto Montt | – | (–) |
| 2015–2016 | Deportes Linares | – | (–) |
- * Club domestic league appearances and goals as of 30 March 2020

Abraham Humberto Gómez Rodríguez (born 11 December 1988) was a Chilean footballer. His last club was Deportes Linares.
