= Julián Rodríguez =

Julián Rodríguez may refer to:

- Julián Rodríguez (footballer, born 1997), Argentine football forward
- Julián Rodríguez (footballer, born 2000), Argentine football centre-back

== See also ==
- Julien Rodriguez (born 1978), French football defender
