= Luis Pérez (footballer, born 1969) =

Chilean footballer and manager

Personal information
- Full name: Luis Alberto Pérez Franco
- Date of birth: 27 January 1969 (age 57)
- Place of birth: San Joaquín, Santiago, Chile
- Position: Midfielder

Team information
- Current team: Malleco Unido (manager)

Youth career
- Colo-Colo

Senior career*
Years	Team	Apps	(Gls)
1988–1993	Colo-Colo		
1989	→ Deportes Valdivia (loan)		
1991	→ Deportes Linares (loan)		
1992	→ Deportes Arica (loan)		
1993	→ Magallanes (loan)		
1993–1994	FC Lorient		
1994	Coquimbo Unido		
1994	AS Dompierroise		
1995–1996	US Charnay		
1997	Santiago Morning		
1997	Unión San Felipe		
1999–2000	Western Mass Pioneers		

Managerial career
- 2008–2015: Colo-Colo (youth)
- 2015: Colo-Colo (assistant)
- 2017–2018: Municipal Santiago
- 2019: Deportes Linares
- 2020: Deportes Linares
- 2021: Trasandino
- 2022–2023: Deportes Linares
- 2023–2024: Provincial Ovalle
- 2024: Santiago City
- 2025–: Malleco Unido
- * Club domestic league appearances and goals

Luis Alberto Pérez Franco (born 27 January 1969) is a Chilean football manager and former player who played as a midfielder. He is the current manager of Malleco Unido.

== Playing career ==
Pérez joined Colo-Colo youth system in the late 1970s thanks to the former player Bernardo Bello, who met him playing in the Tabancura neighborhood in Las Condes, Santiago. After having little chance to play for the first team, he played on loan at Deportes Valdivia, Deportes Linares, Deportes Arica and Magallanes.

In his homeland, Pérez also played for Coquimbo Unido, Santiago Morning and Unión San Felipe.

Abroad, he played for the French clubs FC Lorient, AS Dompierroise and US Chanay. In the United States, he played for Western Mass Pioneers.

== Coaching career ==
After graduating as football manager at the INAF (National Football Institute), he started a football academy with the Caja de Compensación (compensation fund) Gabriela Mistral what turned into a Colo-Colo Academy.

Pérez worked at the Colo-Colo youth system for eight years, taking part of the training of players such as Vicente Pizarro, Luciano Arriagada, Luis Rojas, Alexander Oroz, among others. In 2017, he joined Municipal Santiago thanks to the former footballers Leonel Herrera and his son of the same name, winning the league title of the Tercera B.

Since then, he also won league titles of the Tercera A with Deportes Linares (2019, 2022) and Trasandino in 2021.

Pérez was confirmed as coach of Deportes Linares for the 2023 season. In May 2023, he switched to Provincial Ovalle, becoming the Tercera A champions.

== Honours ==
=== As manager ===
Municipal Santiago

- Tercera B: 2017

Deportes Linares

- Tercera A: 2019
- Tercera A: 2022

Trasandino

- Tercera A: 2021

Provincial Ovalle

- Tercera A: 2023
