= Gabriel Harding =

Chilean footballer

Personal information
- Full name: Gabriel Harding Subiabre
- Date of birth: 17 September 2000 (age 26)
- Place of birth: Curicó, Chile
- Height: 1.85 m (6 ft 1 in)
- Position: Striker

Team information
- Current team: Atlético Colina

Youth career
- Curicó Unido

Senior career*
Years	Team	Apps	(Gls)
2020–2024	Curicó Unido	40	(3)
2022	→ San Luis (loan)	14	(2)
2022	→ Deportes Valdivia (loan)	11	(3)
2023	→ Deportes Antofagasta (loan)	13	(0)
2024	→ Deportes Melipilla (loan)	19	(6)
2025	Provincial Ovalle	21	(8)
2026–	Atlético Colina	0	(0)
- * Club domestic league appearances and goals as of 25 December 2025

Gabriel Harding Subiabre (born 17 September 2000) is a Chilean footballer who plays as a striker for Atlético Colina.

== Club career ==
Born in Curicó, Chile, Harding was trained at local club Curicó Unido and made his professional debut in the 2020 Chilean Primera División under Martín Palermo. From 2022 to 2024, he was subsequuently loaned out to San Luis de Quillota, Deportes Valdivia, Deportes Antofagasta and Deportes Melipilla.

In 2025, Harding joined Provincial Ovalle in the Segunda División Profesional de Chile. The next year, he switched to Atlético Colina.

== International career ==
In 2016 and 2017, Harding took part in training sessions of Chile U17 under Hernán Caputto.
