= Ignacio Mesina =

Chilean footballer (born 2001)

Personal information
- Full name: Ignacio Antonio Mesina Silva
- Date of birth: 16 January 2001 (age 25)
- Place of birth: Santiago, Chile
- Height: 1.80 m (5 ft 11 in)
- Positions: Defender; midfielder

Team information
- Current team: Atlético Colina

Youth career
- 2013–2021: Palestino

Senior career*
Years	Team	Apps	(Gls)
2020–2022	Palestino	19	(0)
2023–2024	Coquimbo Unido	5	(0)
2025	Santiago City	11	(0)
2026–	Atlético Colina	0	(0)
- * Club domestic league appearances and goals as of 24 March 2026

Ignacio Antonio Mesina Silva (born 16 January 2001) is a Chilean footballer who plays as a defender for Atlético Colina.

== Career ==
Mesina came to the Palestino youth system at the age of 12. He signed his first professional contract on 12 January 2021.

In 2023, Mesina joined Coquimbo Unido. In 2025, he switched to Santiago City in the Segunda División Profesional de Chile.

On 30 March 2026, Mesina joined Atlético Colina.
