= Romo (disambiguation) =

Romo was a 1990s musical and nightclubbing movement in the UK.

Romo may also refer to:

- Romo (surname), a list of people
- Daniela Romo, stage name of Mexican singer, actress and TV hostess Teresa Presmanes Corona (born 1959)
- Rømø, a Danish island
- Romo Lampkin, a character from the 2003-2008 remake series Battlestar Galactica
- Romo (Dune), a planet from Frank Herbert's fictional Dune universe
- Romo Planitia, a plain on Saturn's moon Titan
- Reality of Missing Out, a variant of fear of missing out
