= El Carmen de Pijilí =

- Parish
- Location within Ecuador
- Coordinates: 2°45′S 79°36′W
- Country: Ecuador
- Province: Azuay Province
- Canton: Camilo Ponce Enríquez Canton

Area
  - Total: 69.8 sq mi (180.9 km^{2})

Population (2001)
  - Total: 1,239
- Time zone: UTC-5 (ECT)

El Carmen de Pijilí is a town and parish in Camilo Ponce Enríquez Canton, Azuay Province, Ecuador. The parish covers an area of 180.9 km² and according to the 2001 Ecuadorian census it had a population total of 1,239.
