= Ramiro Míguez =

Argentine football player and manager

Personal information
- Full name: Ramiro Hernán Míguez
- Date of birth: 6 June 1983 (age 43)
- Place of birth: Haedo, Argentina
- Position: Goalkeeper

Senior career*
| Years | Team | Apps | (Gls) |
| 2001–2003 | Deportivo Merlo | 2 | (0) |
| 2003–2004 | Atlas | 1 | (0) |
| 2006–2008 | Deportivo Paraguayo | 54 | (0) |
| 2008–2009 | Yupanqui | 20 | (0) |
| 2009–2010 | Muñiz | 3 | (0) |

Managerial career
- Deportivo Coreano
- 2011–2012: Centro Español
- 2013: Deportes Linares
- 2014: Atlético Lugano
- 2014–2016: Juventud Unida SM
- 2016: Deportivo Riestra (assistant)
- 2016–2017: Deportivo Paraguayo
- 2018–2019: RI 3 Corrales
- * Club domestic league appearances and goals

Ramiro Hernán Míguez (born 6 June 1986) is an Argentine football manager and former player who played as a goalkeeper.

== Playing career ==
A goalkeeper, Míguez developed all his career in his homeland playing for Deportivo Merlo, Atlas, Deportivo Paraguayo, Yupanqui and Muñiz.

== Coaching career ==
In his homeland, Míguez has coached clubs such as Deportivo Coreano, Centro Español, Atlético Lugano, Juventud Unida de San Miguel, and Deportivo Paraguayo. He also served as assistant coach in Deportivo Riestra.

Abroad, Míguez coached Chilean club Deportes Linares in 2013 and the Paraguayan club RI 3 Corrales in 2018–19.
