= Darío Dubois =

Argentinian footballer

Personal information
- Full name: Darío Enrique Dubois
- Date of birth: 10 March 1971
- Place of birth: Buenos Aires, Argentina
- Date of death: 17 March 2008 (aged 37)
- Height: 1.82 m (6 ft 0 in)
- Position: Centre-back

Senior career*
Years	Team	Apps	(Gls)
1994	Yupanqui	0	(0)
1995–1997	Lugano	20	(1)
1998–1999	Ferrocarril Midland	23	(3)
1999–2000	Deportivo Riestra	23	(2)
2000	Deportivo Laferrere	8	(0)
2001	Cañuelas	1	(0)
2001–2002	Ferrocarril Midland	30	(3)
2002–2004	Victoriano Arenas	37	(4)
2005	Deportivo Paraguayo	4	(0)
Total		146	(13)
- * Club domestic league appearances and goals

Darío Enrique Dubois (10 March 1971 - 17 March 2008), better known as Darío Dubois, was an Argentine footballer famous for playing in numerous games with corpse-paint makeup. Due to this unusual characteristic, he became a famous and revered figure among those who like curious facts about football.

== Professional career ==
In total, Dubois played 146 games and scored 13 goals for clubs in the Primera C and Primera D categories, fourth and fifth level of Argentine football respectively. In 1999, as a player for Ferrocarril Midland, before a match against Argentino de Merlo, Dubois took the field wearing corpse paint, a style of makeup used by black metal musicians, a subgenre of heavy metal music he admired. He would do it again in 13 matches until the Argentine Football Association issued a regulation prohibiting the practice. Dubois retired in 2005 after suffering a ligament injury in his knee and not earning enough money to perform the knee surgery.

== Death ==
Dubois was shot twice on 2 March 2008, as he left a club where he worked as an audio operator in La Matanza Partido. After two weeks in hospital, Dubois died on March 17. The causes have unfortunately never been clarified.
