= 2001 Campeonato Nacional Primera B =

Primera B de Chile
- Season: 2001
- Champions: Deportes Temuco
- Promoted: Deportes Temuco; Cobresal
- Relegated: Deportes Linares
- Top goalscorer: Carlos Arturo Cáceres (23)

The 2001 Primera B de Chile was the 51st completed season of the Primera B de Chile.

== Table ==
Pos	Team	Pld	W	D	L	GF	GA	GD	Pts	Promotion or relegation
1	Deportes Temuco (C)	30	18	6	6	64	31	+33	60	Promoted to 2002 Primera División de Chile season
2	Cobresal	30	16	6	8	47	27	+20	54	Promoted to 2002 Primera División de Chile season
3	Deportes Antofagasta	30	13	9	8	36	34	+2	48	
4	Fernández Vial	30	15	8	7	44	34	+10	53	
5	Deportes Talcahuano	30	13	7	10	40	32	+8	46	
6	Provincial Osorno	30	12	6	12	44	43	+1	42	
7	Unión La Calera	30	11	11	8	33	41	−8	44	
8	Everton	30	11	7	12	37	42	−5	40	
9	Universidad de Concepción	30	11	6	13	37	43	−6	39	
10	Deportes Ovalle	30	10	7	13	43	51	−8	37	
11	Deportes La Serena	30	10	9	11	38	46	−8	39	
12	Magallanes	30	6	13	11	33	44	−11	31	
13	Deportes Iquique	30	7	11	12	33	43	−10	32	
14	Deportes Arica	30	7	10	13	40	44	−4	31	
15	Deportes Melipilla	30	7	9	14	30	43	−13	30	
16	Deportes Linares	30	6	9	15	37	54	−17	27	Relegated to Tercera División

(C) Champions

== See also ==
- Chilean football league system
