= Rolando García =

Rolando García may refer to:

- Rolando García (Chilean footballer) (born 1942)
- Rolando García (Paraguayan footballer) (born 1990)
- Rolando García (Argentine scientist) (1919–2012), see Jean Piaget
