= Leonardo Incorvaia =

Argentine footballer

Personal information
- Full name: Leonardo Francisco Incorvaia
- Date of birth: 26 June 1992 (age 34)
- Place of birth: Rosario, Argentina
- Position: Defender

Team information
- Current team: Alvarado

Youth career
- Newell's Old Boys
- 2007–2008: Juan XXIII
- 2008–2009: Alianza Sport
- 2010–2014: Ferro Carril Oeste

Senior career*
Years	Team	Apps	(Gls)
2014–2016	Ferro Carril Oeste	27	(0)
2016	Barracas Central	0	(0)
2017	Sliema Wanderers	10	(0)
2017–2018	UAI Urquiza	8	(0)
2018	San Telmo	6	(1)
2019	Mons Calpe	25	(1)
2019	APC Chions	8	(0)
2020	Mushuc Runa	11	(0)
2021	Isidro Metapán	14	(1)
2021	East Riffa	–	(–)
2022	Temperley	4	(0)
2022	Sportivo Ameliano	13	(0)
2023	Barnechea	21	(0)
2024	Cerro	0	(0)
2025–	Alvarado	0	(0)
- * Club domestic league appearances and goals

Leonardo Francisco Incorvaia (born 26 June 1992) is an Argentine footballer who plays as a defender for Alvarado.

== Career ==
Born in Rosario, Argentina, Incorvaia was with Newell's Old Boys, Juan XXIII, Alianza Sport and Ferro Carril Oeste as a youth player. He made his debut with Ferro Carril Oeste in 2014.

With an extensive career around the world, he has played in Malta, Gibraltar, Italy, Ecuador, El Salvador, Bahrain, Paraguay, Chile and Uruguay.

In 2024, he joined Cerro in the Uruguayan Primera División.
