= Jens Buss =

Chilean footballer (born 1997)

Personal information
- Full name: Jens Buss Barrios
- Date of birth: 24 January 1997 (age 29)
- Place of birth: Vitacura, Chile
- Height: 1.85 m (6 ft 1 in)
- Position: Full-back

Team information
- Current team: Trasandino
- Number: 28

Youth career
- Universidad Católica
- Santiago Morning
- Palestino
- O'Higgins

Senior career*
Years	Team	Apps	(Gls)
2018	Rodelindo Román	–	(–)
2019–2021	Curicó Unido	35	(3)
2021–2024	Deportes Antofagasta	14	(0)
2022	→ Deportes La Serena (loan)	18	(0)
2023	→ Deportes Copiapó (loan)	8	(0)
2024	Cobresal	5	(0)
2024–2025	Tabor Sežana	16	(2)
2026–	Trasandino	0	(0)
- * Club domestic league appearances and goals as of 16 February 2026

Jens Buss Barrios (born 24 January 1997) is a Chilean footballer who plays as a full back for Trasandino.

== Career ==
After staying at several clubs during his youth in Chile, he went to Europe and took two failed tests in Dutch football clubs. Back in Chile, he joined Rodelindo Román, whose owner was Arturo Vidal, at the Tercera B. On 2019 season, he joined Chilean Primera División club Curicó Unido.

In 2021 season, he moved to Deportes Antofagasta on a deal for four years. In 2022 and 2023, he was loaned to Deportes La Serena and Deportes Copiapó, respectively.

At the end of February 2024, Buss ended his contract with Deportes Antofagasta and signed with Cobresal. However, Deportes Antofagasta did not acknowledge the signing of the settlement, preventing the registration for his new club in the National Professional Football Association (ANFP). So, SIFUP, the trade union of professional footballers in Chile, made public a complaint against the ANFP and Deportes Antofagasta. Finally, Cobresal made official his signing on 14 March.

In the second half of 2024, Buss moved to Europe and joined Slovenian club Tabor Sežana.

Back to Chile, Buss joined Trasandino in August 2026.

== Personal life ==
As his father is German, he also holds German citizenship and speaks German.
