= Víctor Adriazola =

Chilean footballer (born 1943)

Personal information
- Full name: Víctor Manuel Adriazola Ortiz
- Date of birth: 3 June 1943 (age 83)
- Position: Defender

Youth career
- Green Cross

Senior career*
Years	Team	Apps	(Gls)
1961–1962	Green Cross	43	(0)
1963–1972	Universidad Católica	269	(3)
1973	Audax Italiano		
1974–1975	Universidad Católica		
1976–1977	O'Higgins		
1978	Deportes Arica		

International career
1960	Chile U20		
1966–1967	Chile	10	(0)

Managerial career
- 1985: Deportes Linares
- 1989: Municipal Las Condes
- 1993: Unión Santa Cruz
- 1995: Deportes Linares
- * Club domestic league appearances and goals

Víctor Manuel Adriazola Ortiz (born 3 June 1943) is a former Chilean footballer who played as a defender.

== Career ==
A historical player of Universidad Católica, he also played for Green Cross, O'Higgins and Deportes Arica.

As a member of Green Cross, he was a member of a Chile youth team under Fernando Riera in 1960 alongside players such as Francisco Valdés, Fabián Capot, Guillermo Yávar, among others.

At senior level, he played in ten matches for the Chile national team in 1966–67. He was also part of Chile's squad for the 1967 South American Championship.

As a football manager, he led Deportes Linares, Municipal Las Condes and Unión Santa Cruz.
