= Martín Gálvez =

Chilean footballer (born 1962)

Personal information
- Full name: Martín Venancio Gálvez Asún
- Date of birth: 17 July 1962 (age 64)
- Place of birth: Santiago, Chile
- Position: Forward

Youth career
- Colegio Calasanz
- La Reina (league team)
- Universidad de Chile

Senior career*
Years	Team	Apps	(Gls)
1982–1985	Universidad de Chile		
1984–1985	→ Vitória SC (loan)	15	(3)
1985–1988	Cruz Azul		
1988–1989	Pumas UNAM		
1990	Universidad de Chile		
1991	O'Higgins		
1992	Deportes Concepción		
1993–1994	Audax Italiano		

International career
1983	Chile U23	3	(1)

Managerial career
- 1998: Trasandino
- * Club domestic league appearances and goals

Martín Venancio Gálvez Asún (born 17 July 1962) is a Chilean professional former footballer who played as a forward for clubs in Chile, Portugal and Mexico.

== Club career ==
A left-footed forward, as a young player he played for Colegio Calasanz and the La Reina League Team. Next, he joined Universidad de Chile youth system, being a well remembered player and team captain. In Chile, he also played for O'Higgins, Deportes Concepción and Audax Italiano.

Thanks of an Argentine friend of his brother, who had played for Braga, he came to Portugal and joined Vitória Guimarães on loan for nine months in the 1984–85 season. Then he moved to Mexico and played for Cruz Azul and Pumas UNAM. For Pumas UNAM, he became the first foreign player after around ten years and won the 1989 CONCACAF Champions' Cup.

== International career ==
He represented Chile at the 1983 Pan American Games in Caracas, Venezuela, scoring a goal versus United States U23.

== Post-retirement ==
Gálvez has worked as coach and director of football academies and coach of the University for Development team.

He has taken part in friendly matches along with historical players of Universidad de Chile such as Cristián Castañeda and Patricio Mardones.

== Honours ==
Pumas UNAM

- CONCACAF Champions' Cup: 1989
