= Orlando Mondaca =

Chilean footballer

Personal information
- Full name: Orlando Alberto Mondaca Reyes
- Date of birth: 24 June 1961 (age 65)
- Place of birth: Santiago, Chile
- Position: Midfielder

Youth career
- Universidad de Chile

Senior career*
Years	Team	Apps	(Gls)
1978–1989	Universidad de Chile	224	(32)
1986	→ Cobresal (loan)	32	(0)
1988	→ Cobreloa (loan)	5	(3)
1990–1992	Coquimbo Unido	58	(2)
1993–1994	Deportes Antofagasta	58	(0)
1995	Deportes La Serena	22	(1)

International career
1980–1987	Chile	7	(0)
1985	Chile XI		
1985	Chile A-2		
1987	Chile Pre-Olympic		

Managerial career
- 2003: Hosanna
- 2003: Cristo Salva
- 2007: Santiago Morning
- 2008–2009: San Marcos
- 2009–2010: Coquimbo Unido
- 2010: Deportes Copiapó
- 2012: Deportes Melipilla
- 2021: Deportes Colina
- Atlético Colina (youth)
- * Club domestic league appearances and goals

Orlando Alberto Mondaca Reyes (born 24 June 1961) is a Chilean former football player who played as a midfielder.

== Club career ==
A product of Universidad de Chile, Mondaca made his senior debut in 1978. A historical player for the club, he was a member of the 1989 squad that competed by first time in the club history in the Chilean second level and immediately returned to the Chilean Primera División for the 1990 season.

Mondaca also had stints with Cobresal in 1986 and Cobreloa in 1988, winning the league title.

In 1990, Mondaca switched to Coquimbo Unido in the Segunda División, getting the promotion to the top division. He was a key member of the squad that became the runner-up in the 1991 Primera División and took part in the 1992 Copa Libertadores.

Following Coquimbo Unido, Mondaca played for Deportes Antofagasta (1993–94) and Deportes La Serena (1995) in the Chilean top level.

== International career ==
Mondaca made seven appearances for the Chile national team between 1980 and 1987. In 1985, he also represented the B-team at the friendly tournaments Indonesian Independence Cup, where Chile became champion, and Los Angeles Nations Cup.

Mondaca also represented Chile at the 1987 Pre-Olympic Tournament.

== Coaching career ==
Mondaca started his career with the classic rivals Hosanna and Cristo Salva in 2003. After, he led Santiago Morning, San Marcos de Arica, Coquimbo Unido, Deportes Copiapó, Deportes Melipilla and Deportes Colina. He continued coaching at the Atlético Colina youth ranks and football academies like US Newen.
