= Javier Quiñones =

Chilean footballer

Personal information
- Full name: Javier Antonio Quiñones Navarro
- Date of birth: 7 October 2002 (age 24)
- Place of birth: La Ligua, Chile
- Height: 1.78 m (5 ft 10 in)
- Position: Forward

Team information
- Current team: Trasandino
- Number: 10

Youth career
- 2016–2021: Audax Italiano

Senior career*
Years	Team	Apps	(Gls)
2021–2025	Audax Italiano	5	(0)
2021	→ Deportes Limache (loan)	2	(0)
2023	→ Deportes Melipilla (loan)	9	(0)
2025	→ Trasandino (loan)	22	(11)
2026–	Trasandino	10	(7)
- * Club domestic league appearances and goals as of 30 June 2026

Javier Antonio Quiñones Navarro (born 7 October 2002) is a Chilean footballer who plays as a forward for Trasandino.

== Club career ==
Born in La Ligua, Chile, Quiñones joined the Audax Italiano youth ranks at the age of 14. He was loaned out to Deportes Limache in 2021 and was promoted to the Audax Italiano first team under Juan José Ribera the next year. During the first half of 2023, he played for Deportes Melipilla and returned to Audax Italiano for the second half of the year, making his debut with them in the 1–1 draw against Coquimbo Unido in the Chilean Primera División.

In 2025, Quiñones was sent on loan to Trasandino de Los Andes. Ended his contract with Audax Italiano, he renewed with Trasandino for the 2026 season.
