= Camilo Ponce (footballer) =

Chilean footballer (born 1991)

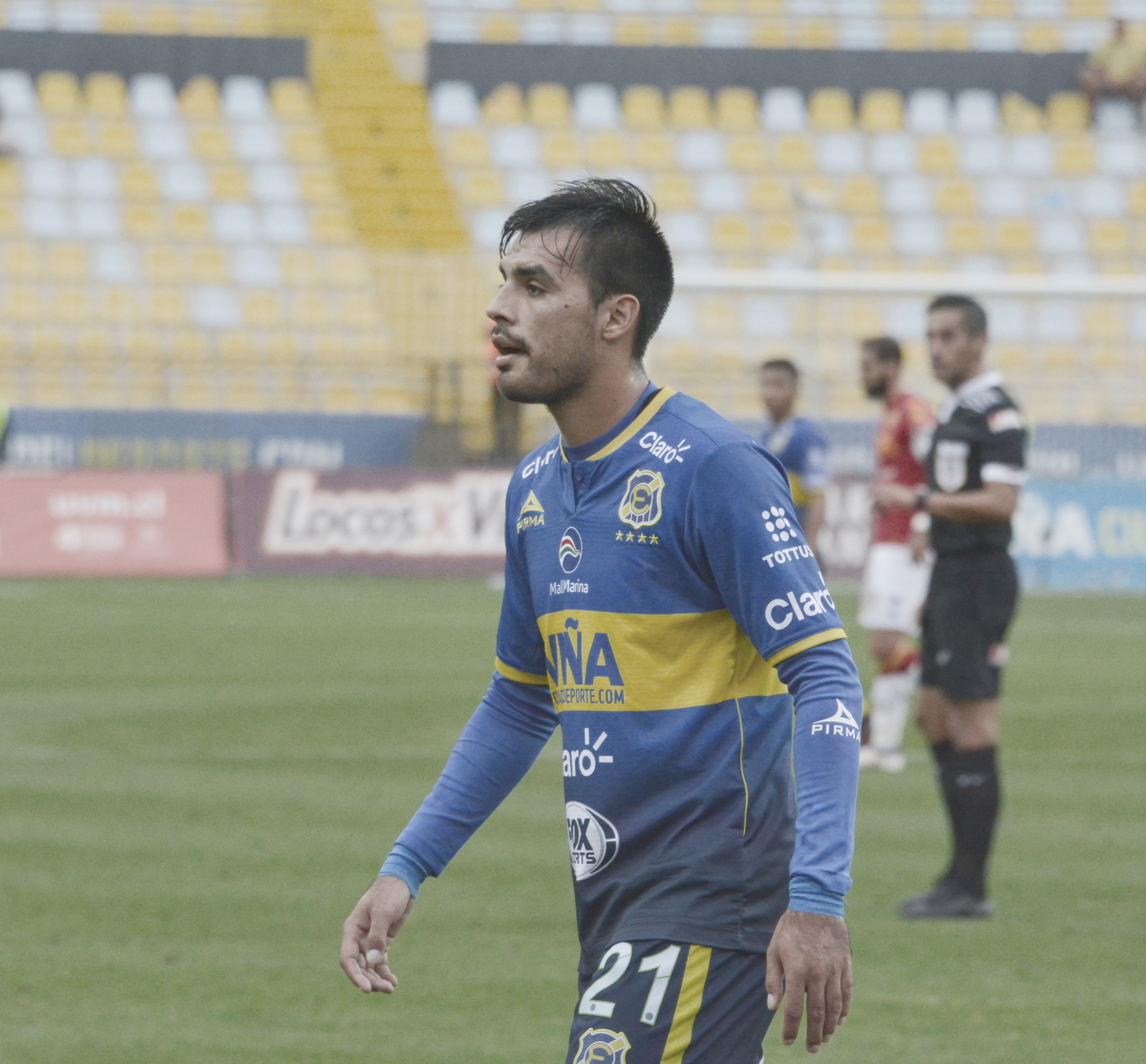
- Ponce with Everton in 2018

Personal information
- Full name: Camilo Leonardo Ponce Rojas
- Date of birth: 18 February 1991 (age 35)
- Place of birth: Quilpué, Chile
- Height: 1.79 m (5 ft 10 in)
- Position: Forward

Youth career
- Everton

Senior career*
| Years | Team | Apps | (Gls) |
| 2009–2018 | Everton | 81 | (7) |
| 2010 | → Lota Schwager (loan) | 10 | (1) |
| 2012 | → Trasandino (loan) | – | (–) |
| 2013 | → Trasandino (loan) | 10 | (2) |
| 2016 | → Curicó Unido (loan) | 14 | (6) |
| 2017 | → Ñublense (loan) | 8 | (0) |
| 2019–2022 | Deportes Copiapó | 81 | (13) |
| 2023 | Barnechea | 24 | (4) |
| 2024 | Deportes Recoleta | 21 | (4) |
| 2025 | Deportes Rengo | 15 | (7) |
- * Club domestic league appearances and goals as of 26 May 2026

Camilo Leonardo Ponce Rojas (born 18 February 1991) is a Chilean footballer who plays as a forward.

== Career ==
In 2024, Ponce signed with Deportes Recoleta.
