= Hugo Pedraza =

Argentine football player and manager

Personal information
- Full name: Hugo Rubén Pedraza
- Date of birth: 1951
- Place of birth: Argentina
- Date of death: 23 June 1998 (aged 47)
- Position: Midfielder

Senior career*
Years	Team	Apps	(Gls)
1969–1976	Gimnasia La Plata	257	(22)
1976	Atlético Ledesma	3	(0)
1977	América de Cali		
1977–1979	Estudiantes LP	34	(1)
1980	Deportes Concepción	33	(4)
1981	Nueva Chicago	39	(1)
1983	Deportivo Morón	13	(0)
1985	Atlético Huanguelen		
1986	Deportivo Armenio	1	(0)

Managerial career
- Nueva Chicago
- 1989: Deportes Laja
- 1990: Deportes Linares
- 1993–1994: Gimnasia y Tiro
- 1998: Patronato
- * Club domestic league appearances and goals

Hugo Rubén Pedraza (1951 – 23 June 1998) was an Argentine football midfielder and manager.

== Playing career ==
A midfielder, Pedraza made his professional debut with Gimnasia y Esgrima La Plata on 30 March 1969 in the 2–2 away draw against Banfield in the Campeonato Metropolitano. He stayed with them until 1976.

In his homeland, Pedraza also played for Atlético Ledesma, Estudiantes de La Plata, Nueva Chicago, Deportivo Morón, Atlético Huanguelen and Deportivo Armenio.

Abroad, he had stints with Colombian club América de Cali in 1977 and Chilean club Deportes Concepción in 1980.

== Coaching career ==
In his homeland, Pedraza coached clubs such as Nueva Chicago, Gimnasia y Tiro and Patronato.

Abroad, he coached Chilean club Deportes Linares in 1990.

== Personal life and death ==
He was the father of the footballer Hugo Hernán Pedraza.

Pedraza died on 23 June 1998 of a heart attack, aged 47.
