= Agustín Volker =

Chilean footballer (born 1999)

Personal information
- Full name: Agustín Volker Vergara
- Date of birth: 14 February 1999 (age 27)
- Place of birth: Viña del Mar, Chile
- Height: 1.91 m (6 ft 3 in)
- Position: Centre-back

Youth career
- 2012–2017: Everton

College career
Years	Team	Apps	(Gls)
2018–2019	Dayton Flyers	15	(1)

Senior career*
Years	Team	Apps	(Gls)
2016–2017	Everton	1	(0)
2019	Dayton Dutch Lions		
2019	Figueirense		
2020–2021	Unión Española	3	(0)
2021–2022	Coquimbo Unido	0	(0)
2021	→ San Antonio Unido (loan)	8	(0)
2022	→ Barnechea (loan)	22	(0)
2023	Barnechea	0	(0)

International career
2015	Chile U17		
2017	Chile U20		
- * Club domestic league appearances and goals as of 20 March 2024

Agustín Volker Vergara (born 14 February 1999) is a Chilean footballer who plays as a centre-back. He last played for Barnechea.

== Playing career ==
Born in Viña del Mar, Chile, as a child, Volker represented his school team, Capellán Pascal, as the team captain, being named the MVP in both 2015 and 2016 at the conference championships. At club level, he was with the Everton de Viña del Mar youth ranks from 2012 to 2017.

After making his professional debut with Everton in 2016 at the age of seventeen, he signed with OneSports, a high performance program that gives sports grants, and emigrated to the United States to study at the University of Dayton and play for the Dayton Flyers in 2018, making fifteen appearances and scoring one goal. The next year, he joined Dayton Dutch Lions in the USL League Two.

After spending six months with Brazilian side Figueirense, he returned to Chile and joined Unión Española in the top division for the 2020 season.

The next season, he switched to Coquimbo Unido, making appearances in the 2021 Copa Chile. In the squad, he coincided with Chile international players at the World Cup such as Esteban Paredes, Carlos Carmona and Jean Beausejour. He had stints on loan with San Antonio Unido and Barnechea in 2021 and 2022, respectively.

For the 2023 season, he renewed his contract with Barnechea.

== International career ==
Volker has taken part of the Chile national team at both under-17 and under-20 levels.

== Personal life ==
Volker holds Dutch citizenship.

He has two siblings, Juan and Lucas.
