= Guillermo Cubillos =

Chilean footballer (born 1995)

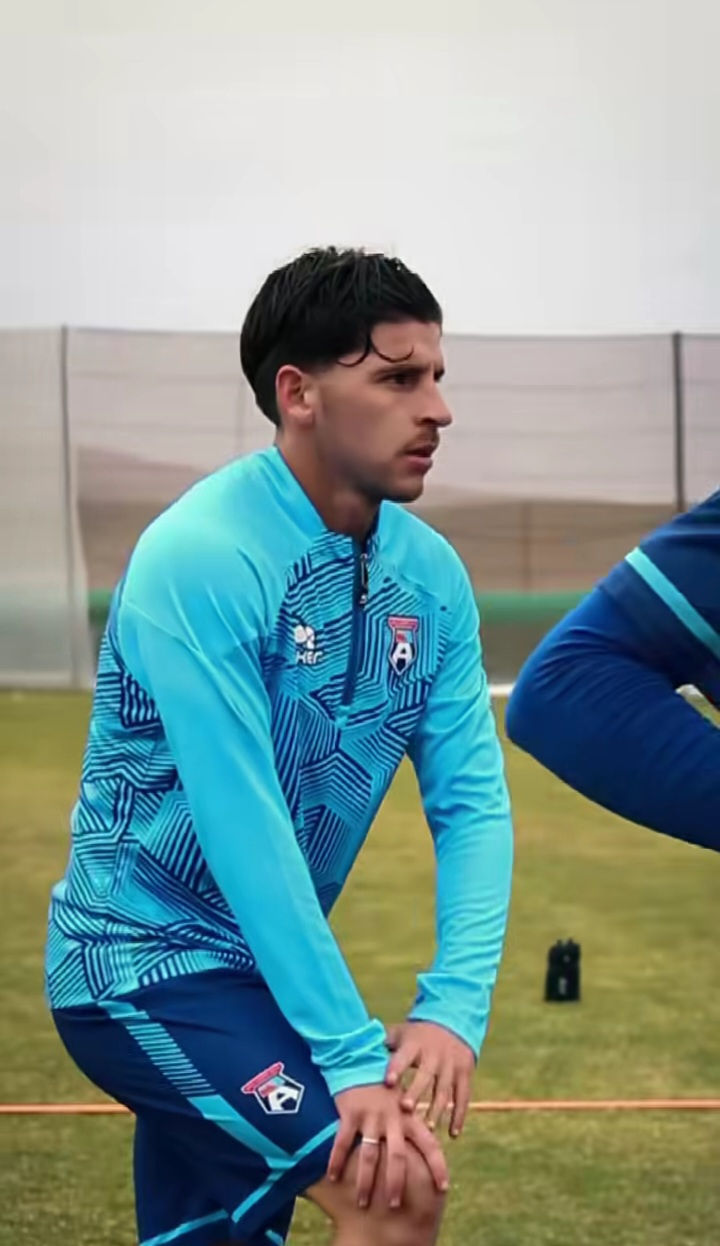
- Cubillos in 2025.

Personal information
- Full name: Guillermo Cubillos González
- Date of birth: 14 January 1995 (age 31)
- Place of birth: Rengo, Chile
- Height: 1.73 m (5 ft 8 in)
- Positions: Defender; right back

Team information
- Current team: San Marcos
- Number: 15

Youth career
- O'Higgins

Senior career*
Years	Team	Apps	(Gls)
2015–2017	O'Higgins	8	(0)
2016–2017	→ Colchagua (loan)	16	(1)
2017	Colchagua	17	(0)
2018–2019	Rangers	24	(0)
2020–23	Barnechea	94	(0)
2024	San Luis	23	(0)
2025-	San Marcos	24	(0)
- * Club domestic league appearances and goals as of 18 March 2026

Guillermo Cubillos (born 14 January 1995) is a Chilean footballer that currently plays for Primera B de Chile club San Marcos as a defender.

== Career ==
=== Youth career ===
Cubillos started his career at Primera División de Chile club O'Higgins. He progressed from the under categories club all the way to the senior team.

=== O'Higgins ===
On 1 February 2015, Cubillos debuted against Unión La Calera replacing Damián Lizio at the 90+2' on the 2–1 win at the Estadio El Teniente.
