= Mauro Visaguirre =

Argentine-Chilean footballer

Personal information
- Full name: Mauro Leandro Visaguirre Peñaranda
- Date of birth: 24 April 1994 (age 32)
- Place of birth: Mendoza, Argentina
- Height: 1.74 m (5 ft 9 in)
- Position: Left-back

Team information
- Current team: Huracán Las Heras

Youth career
- Godoy Cruz

Senior career*
Years	Team	Apps	(Gls)
2015	Godoy Cruz	0	(0)
2016–2017	Gutiérrez	53	(0)
2017	O'Higgins	1	(0)
2018	Gutiérrez	8	(0)
2018	Deportivo Maipú	0	(0)
2018	Unión La Calera	0	(0)
2018–2020	Deportivo Maipú	48	(0)
2021	Gimnasia de Mendoza	9	(0)
2022	Huracán Las Heras	25	(0)
2023	Barnechea	12	(0)
2024–	Huracán Las Heras	0	(0)
- * Club domestic league appearances and goals as of 14 August 2023

Mauro Leandro Visaguirre Peñaranda (born 24 April 1994) is an Argentine-Chilean footballer who plays as a left-back for Huracán Las Heras.

== Club career ==
Born in Mendoza, Argentina, Visaguirre is a product of Godoy Cruz youth system, being part of the first team in 2015, but he just played for the reserve team. In 2016, he switched to Gutiérrez.

In July 2017, he moved to Chile and signed with O'Higgins in the Chilean Primera División.

Back in Argentina, he rejoined Gutiérrez in 2018. In the same year, he switched to Deportivo Maipú, playing one match in the Copa Argentina before joining the Chilean club Unión La Calera in July. After having no chances with Unión La Calera, he rejoined Deportivo Maipú, getting the promotion to the 2021 Primera Nacional. In 2021 and 2022, he played for Gimnasia y Esgrima de Mendoza and Huracán Las Heras, respectively.

The next season, he returned to Chile and signed with Barnechea.

In 2024, he rejoined Huracán Las Heras.

== Personal life ==
Visaguirre acquired the Chilean nationality by descent in 2015, since both his maternal grandmother and his mother are Chilean.
