= Gary Moya =

Chilean footballer (born 2001)

Personal information
- Full name: Gary Germán Moya Sandoval
- Date of birth: 23 October 2001 (age 25)
- Place of birth: Viña del Mar, Chile
- Height: 1.72 m (5 ft 8 in)
- Position: Midfielder

Team information
- Current team: Rangers
- Number: 20

Youth career
- Everton

Senior career*
Years	Team	Apps	(Gls)
2020–2025	Everton	40	(2)
2023	→ Barnechea (loan)	26	(1)
2024–2025	→ Rangers (loan)	53	(7)
2026–	Rangers	4	(0)
- * Club domestic league appearances and goals as of 17 March 2026

Gary Germán Moya Sandoval (born 23 October 2001) is a Chilean footballer who plays as a midfielder for Rangers de Talca.

== Career ==
In 2024, Moya joined Rangers de Talca on loan from Everton.
