= Deportes Colina =

Chilean football club

- Full name: Club de Deportes Colina
- Nicknames: Los eléctricos, Las luciérnagas
- Founded: November 27, 2014
- Ground: Estadio Manuel Rojas del Río; Colina, Chile
- Capacity: 4,000
- Owner: Deportes Colina SADP
- Chairman: Matías Balmaceda
- Manager: Fernando Gutiérrez
- League: Segunda División
- 2020: 9th
Home colours	Away colours

Deportes Colina is a Chilean football club, based in Colina, a comune in the Santiago Metropolitan Region. They currently play in the fourth level of Chilean football, the Tercera Division A.

The club was founded on November 27, 2014 as A.C. Colina. Debuted in Tercera Division B in 2016 and won the Tercera División Cup in 2015 and 2016.

Deportes Colina was created with the support of the authorities of Colina and Athletic Club Barnechea.

== Titles ==
- Tercera División Cup: 2

2015, 2016

== Seasons ==
- 1 season in Segunda División
- 3 seasons in Tercera División
- 1 seasons in Tercera División B

== Players ==
=== Current squad ===
As of 14 July 2026. Note: Flags indicate national team as defined under FIFA eligibility rules; some limited exceptions apply. Players may hold more than one non-FIFA nationality.

No.	Pos.	Nation	Player
1	GK	CHI	Tomás López
2	DF	CHI	Ignacio Mesina
3	DF	CHI	Cristóbal Finch
4	DF	CHI	Martín Ochoa
5	DF	CHI	Alejandro Contreras
6	MF	COL	Juan David Bacca
7	MF	CHI	Leonardo Naranjo
8	MF	CHI	Alexis Hormazábal
9	FW	CHI	Gabriel Harding
10	MF	CHI	Franco Gutiérrez
11	FW	CHI	Cristian Alarcón (loan from Colo-Colo)
13	GK	CHI	Juan José Echave
14	FW	CHI	Jhon Bravo
15	DF	CHI	César Evans (c)

No.	Pos.	Nation	Player
17	FW	CHI	Ignacio Contreras
19	FW	CHI	Matías Jiménez (loan from Palestino)
20	GK	CHI	Junior Bórquez
21	MF	CHI	Matías Vásquez
22	FW	CHI	Joaquín Zamorano
23	DF	CHI	Bayron Velásquez
24	DF	CHI	Mario Larenas
26	MF	CHI	Santiago Fuentes
27	DF	CHI	Gonzalo Mura
28	DF	CHI	Levit Béjar
30	FW	CHI	Ricardo Luna
31	FW	CHI	Matías Colossi
32	FW	CHI	Mario Muñoz
33	FW	ARG	Felipe Álvarez (loan from Deportes Antofagasta)

== Managers ==
- (Chile) Juan Pablo Guzmán (2015)
- (Chile) Jorge Guzmán (2016)
- (Chile) Juan Pablo Guzmán (2017–2019)
- (Chile) Rodrigo Meléndez (2019–2021)
- (Argentina) Jeremías Viale (2021)
- (Chile) Orlando Mondaca (2021)
- (Chile) Fernando Gutiérrez (2021)
- (Chile) Ítalo Pinochet (2022)
- (Chile) Cristian Febre (2023)
- (Chile) Fernando Gutiérrez (2023–2025)
- (Chile) Gustavo Sepúlveda (2025–Present)

== See also ==
- Chilean football league system
