= Guillermo Yávar =

Chilean footballer (born 1943)

Personal information
- Full name: Guillermo Yávar Romo
- Date of birth: 26 March 1943 (age 83)
- Place of birth: Santiago, Chile
- Position: Midfielder

Youth career
- Magallanes

Senior career*
| Years | Team | Apps | (Gls) |
| 1961–1965 | Magallanes | | |
| 1966–1970 | Universidad de Chile | 133 | (33) |
| 1971–1973 | Unión Española | 94 | (35) |
| 1974 | Universidad de Chile | 23 | (5) |
| 1975 | Universidad Católica | | |
| 1976 | O'Higgins | | |
| 1977–1979 | Cobreloa | | |
| 1980 | Audax Italiano | 10 | (1) |
| 1981 | Aviación | | |

International career
| 1960 | Chile U20 | | |
| 1964–1974 | Chile | 26 | (2) |

Managerial career
- 1983: Ñublense
- 1985: Cobreloa (caretaker)
- 1987–1988: Unión Española (assistant)
- 1989–1991: Provincial Osorno
- 1992: Unión Española
- 1993: Provincial Osorno
- 1994–1995: Deportes La Serena
- 1996: Magallanes
- 1996–1997: Chile U20
- 1997: Magallanes
- 1998: Unión Española
- 2002: Provincial Osorno
- * Club domestic league appearances and goals

Guillermo Yávar Romo (born 26 March 1943) is a former Chilean football manager and midfielder.

== Career ==
Yávar was a member of a Chile youth team under Fernando Riera in 1960 alongside players such as Francisco Valdés, Fabián Capot, Víctor Adriazola, among others. At senior level, he played for Chile in the 1966 and 1974 FIFA World Cups.

He also played for Universidad de Chile, where he would lead the club to the semi-finals of the 1970 Copa Libertadores.
