= Jorge Romo (Chilean footballer) =

Chilean footballer (born 1990)

Personal information
- Full name: Jorge Israel Romo Salinas
- Date of birth: 9 January 1990 (age 36)
- Place of birth: Viña del Mar, Chile
- Height: 1.68 m (5 ft 6 in)
- Position: Midfielder

Team information
- Current team: San Antonio Unido
- Number: 18

Youth career
- Everton

Senior career*
Years	Team	Apps	(Gls)
2011–2018	Everton	119	(7)
2015–2016	→ Deportes Puerto Montt (loan)	29	(3)
2017	→ Cobresal (loan)	28	(4)
2018	→ Rangers (loan)	20	(3)
2019	San Luis	20	(0)
2020	Unión La Calera	4	(0)
2021	Deportes Copiapó	29	(4)
2022	Deportes Puerto Montt	22	(0)
2023	Barnechea	16	(1)
2024–	San Antonio Unido	12	(0)

International career
2011	Chile U20	1	(0)
- * Club domestic league appearances and goals as of 31 July 2024

Jorge Israel Romo Salinas (born 9 January 1990) is a Chilean footballer that currently playing for Chilean footballer who plays as midfielder for San Antonio Unido.

== Career ==
In 2024, Romo joined San Antonio Unido in the Segunda División Profesional de Chile.
