= Romo (surname) =

Romo is a surname of Spanish origin. Notable people include:

- Alfonso Romo (born 1950), Mexican businessman
- Bárbara Romo Fonseca (born 1977), Mexican politician
- Bruno Romo (born 1989), Chilean footballer
- David Romo (born 1978), French former footballer
- Drew Romo (born 2001), American baseball player
- Eneko Romo (born 1979), Spanish footballer
- Enrique Romo (born 1947), Mexican former Major League Baseball pitcher, brother of Vicente Romo
- Fabian Romo (born 1997), American wheelchair basketball player
- Isaac Romo (born 1983), Mexican footballer
- John Parker Romo (born 1997), American football player
- Jorge Romo (1924-2014), Mexican footballer
- Jorge Romo (Chilean footballer) (born 1990)
- Jorge Villalpando Romo (born 1985), Mexican footballer
- José Ramón Romo (born 1963), Spanish retired footballer
- José Romo (born 1993), Venezuelan footballer
- Julio Salas Romo (1913-unknown), Chilean chess player
- Lawrence Romo, American civil servant and former US Air Force lieutenant colonel
- Luis Romo (born 1995), Mexican footballer
- Miguel Romo Medina (born 1949), Mexican politician
- Olle Romo, Swedish music producer, songwriter and drummer
- Osvaldo Romo (c. 1938-2007), Chilean intelligence agent and torturer
- Pedro Romo (actor) (born 1957), Mexican actor and comedian
- Pedro Romo (footballer) (born 1989), Ecuadorian footballer
- Rafael Romo (born 1990), Venezuelan footballer
- Ricardo Romo (born 1943), American President of the University of Texas at San Antonio and urban historian
- Sergio Romo (born 1983), American Major League Baseball pitcher
- Sonia Romo Verdesoto, Ecuadorian poet
- Tony Romo (born 1980), American football quarterback and broadcaster
- Verónica Escobar Romo (born 1955), Mexican lawyer and politician, former mayor of Acapulco
- Vicente Romo (born 1943), Mexican former Major League Baseball pitcher
- Ximena Romo (born 1990), Mexican actress

== See also ==
- Gilda Cruz-Romo (born 1940), Mexican operatic soprano
