= Julián Rodríguez (footballer, born 2000) =

Argentine footballer

Personal information
- Full name: Julián Rodríguez Vuotto
- Date of birth: 1 March 2000 (age 26)
- Place of birth: Villa Luzuriaga, Buenos Aires, Argentina
- Height: 1.84 m (6 ft 0 in)
- Position: Centre-back

Team information
- Current team: Los Andes

Youth career
- Argentino del Oeste
- 2008–2020: River Plate

Senior career*
Years	Team	Apps	(Gls)
2019–2020	River Plate	0	(0)
2019	→ Soledade (loan)	–	(–)
2020–2023	Barnechea	92	(5)
2024	Santiago Morning	29	(3)
2025	Nueva Chicago	26	(0)
2026–	Los Andes	7	(0)
- * Club domestic league appearances and goals as of 17:20, 29 April 2026 (UTC)

Julián Rodríguez Vuotto (born 1 March 2000) is an Argentine footballer who plays as a centre-back for Los Andes.

== Club career ==
Born in Villa Luzuriaga, Rodríguez was with Argentino del Oeste before joining the River Plate youth ranks in 2008. He was loaned out to Brazilian side Soledade Futebol Clube in 2019.

In 2020, Rodríguez moved to Chile and signed with Barnechea. After spending four seasons with them, he switched to Santiago Morning for the 2024 season.

In January 2025, Rodríguez returned to his homeland and joined Nueva Chicago in the Primera B Nacional on a deal until December 2026.
