= Estadio Regional de Los Andes =

Multi-use stadium in Los Andes, Chile

Coordinates: 32°50′19″S 70°36′15″W

- Estadio trasandino
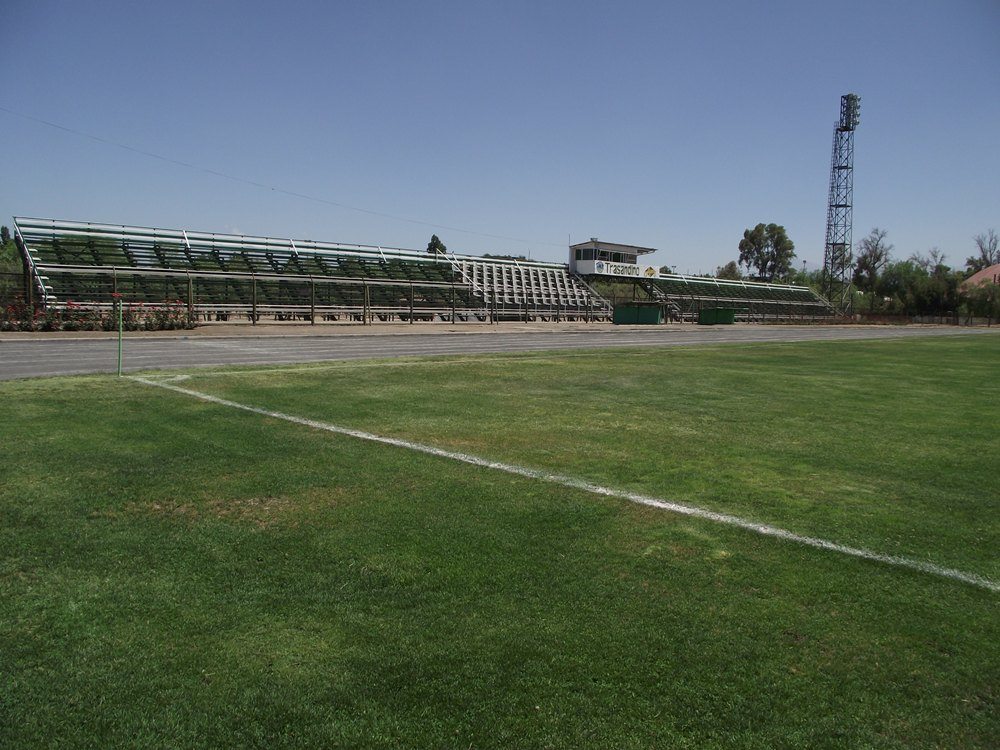
- Estadio Regional de Los Andes
- Interactive map of Estadio Regional de Los Andes
- Location: Los Andes, Chile
- Capacity: 3.300 persons
- Surface: grass

Construction
- Opened: 29 March 1996

Estadio Regional de Los Andes is a multi-use stadium in Los Andes, Chile. It is currently used mostly for football matches and is the home stadium of Trasandino. The stadium holds 3,313 people and was built in 1996.
