= Camilo Ponce Enríquez (parish) =

- Parish and town
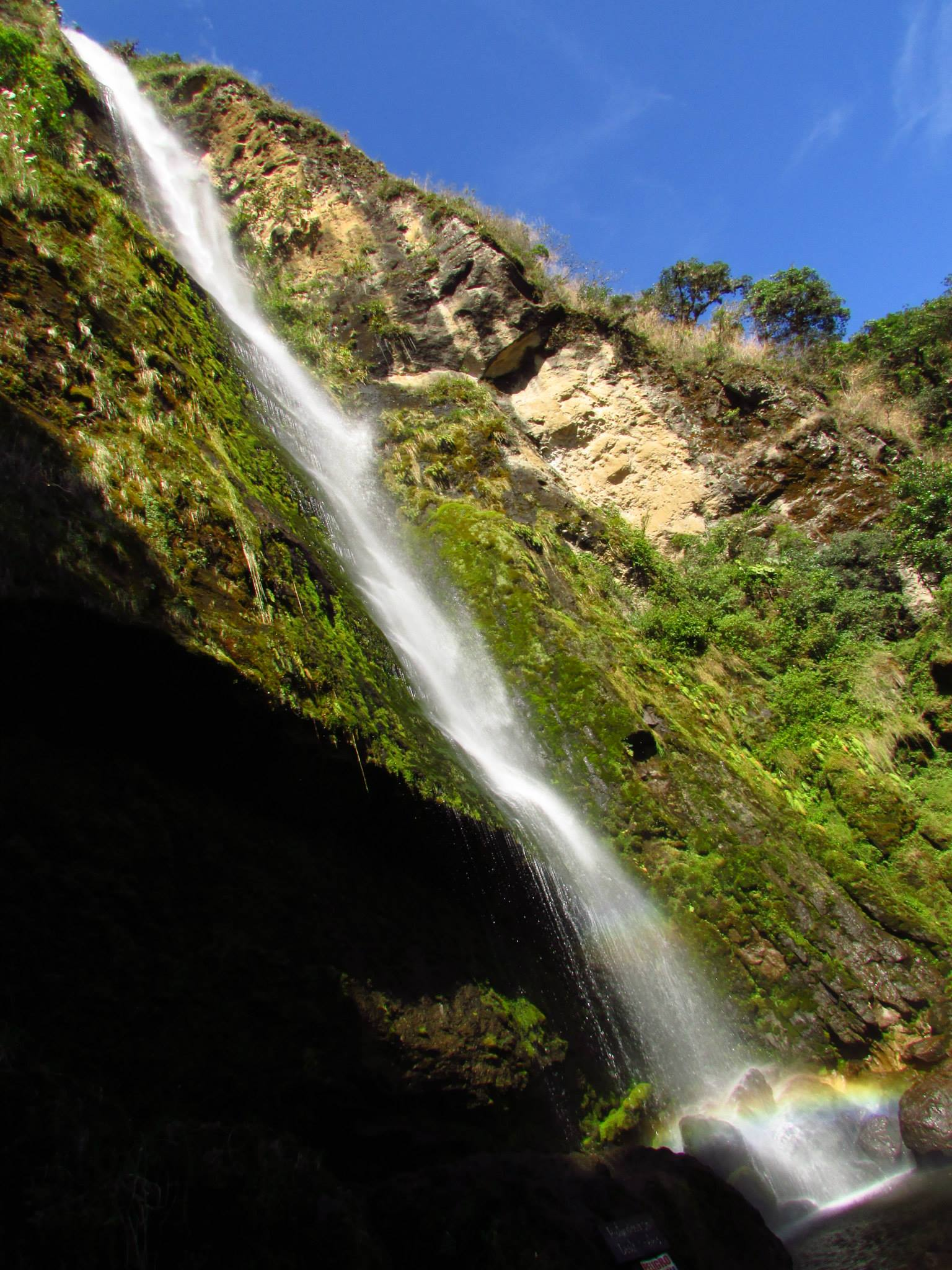

- Location within Ecuador
- Coordinates: 03°03′S 079°44′W
- Country: Ecuador
- Province: Azuay
- Canton: Camilo Ponce Enríquez
- Named for: Camilo Ponce Enríquez

Area
  - Parish and town: 214.6 km^{2} (82.9 sq mi)
  - Town: 2.2 km^{2} (0.85 sq mi)
- Elevation: 362 m (1,188 ft)

Population (2022 census)
  - Parish and town: 22,810
  - Density: 106.3/km^{2} (275.3/sq mi)
  - Town: 10,015
  - Town density: 4,600/km^{2} (12,000/sq mi)
- Climate: Aw

Camilo Ponce Enríquez is a parish and town in the Azuay province in southern Ecuador. It is the seat of the Camilo Ponce Enríquez canton and is located roughly 230 miles southwest of Quito, the capital city of Ecuador.

It is named for Camilo Ponce Enríquez (1912–1976), who served as president of Ecuador from 1956 to 1960.

The parish covers an area of 214.6 square kilometres.
