= Deportivo Paraguayo =

- Full name: Club Atlético Deportivo Paraguayo
- Nickname: El guaraní
- Founded: 15 August 1961; 65 years ago
- Ground: Deportivo Paraguayo stadium
- Capacity: 3 000
- Manager: (Argentina) Daniel Insaurralde
- League: Primera C Metropolitana
- 2024: 25th
Home colours	Away colours

Club Atlético Deportivo Paraguayo is an Argentine football club, founded in 1961 by the Paraguayan community living in Buenos Aires. The club is headquartered in the city of Buenos Aires, while its stadium is located in González Catán, a city in La Matanza Partido. The team currently plays at Primera C Metropolitana, the fourth division of the Argentine football league system.

The club's building is often used for cultural acts such as speeches about Paraguayan history and performance of traditional Paraguayan dances. Until 2024, the team didn't have an own stadium, so they generally play its home games at the venues of Liniers and Atlas.

== History ==
Founded in 1961, following the massive arrival of Paraguayan immigrants to Argentina, the Club Atlético Deportivo Paraguayo became the community's sports center. While its main activity was always soccer, it also held cultural activities, such as talks on the history of Paraguay and book presentations, among other activities.

=== Arrival at the AFA ===
In 1964, the club joined the Argentine Football Association and began competing in the Superior Division of Amateur Football, the direct predecessor of Primera D. On May 2, they made their debut in Argentine football, hosting Defensores de Almagro at Sportivo Palermo, losing 6-2. On July 18, they achieved their first victory against the same opponent away from home, 4–2. Deportivo Paraguayo finished that tournament placed eighth in the Southern Zone. After a few seasons without showing improvement, the club disaffiliated for the 1969 season, returning in 1970.

=== Promotion to Primera C ===
==== Failed Attempts ====
After its return in 1970, the team had failed to excel in the Primera D until the late 1980s, when the division was already the fifth tier.

In the 1988-89 season, it achieved a valuable third place, qualifying for the Torneo Reducido for the first time, where it lost on penalties to Villa San Carlos.

In the 1989-90 season, it had a good campaign, competing until the final rounds for the title with Liniers, who were ultimately crowned champions on the penultimate round. As runner-up, it again qualified for the Reducido, where it reached the final after beating Acassuso and Villa San Carlos, but it was unable to defeat Argentino de Merlo, missing out on promotion.

In the 1990-91 season, they again qualified for the Reducido, after finishing one point away from the title final, and were quickly eliminated by Fénix.

==== Promotion ====
The 1991-92 season would be the club's best, having started the tournament with a moderate draw with Riestra. During the tournament, they achieved notable victories of 7-1 against Sacachispas and 4-0 against Cañuelas. On March 28, 1992, he played the last round of the championship, arriving in first place by a narrow margin over Juventud Unida, the team he was scheduled to face that day and who needed to win to go to a playoff; Finally, with goals from Gómez, Santillán, Álvarez, and Agüero Mendoza, the team was crowned champion by winning 4-2 and was promoted to Primera C for the first time.

=== Heyday ===
On July 4, 1992, they made their Primera C debut, winning 3-2 away to Argentino de Merlo, with goals from José Pellico, Mario Mendoza, and Damián Villalba. In the Apertura, they had a very good season, losing only to Barracas Central and Berazategui, finishing third, which earned them qualification for the Torneo Reducido. There, they reached the final, defeating Midland and Flandria on penalties. On May 22, 1993, they defeated Argentino de Quilmes 1-0, with a goal from López Turitich, in the first leg of the final. However, on June 6, they ended up losing to Quilmes 2-0 in the second leg of the final, falling just short of a historic promotion to the Primera B division.

In the 1995 Clausura Tournament, they again finished third in a short Primera C tournament, which earned them another spot in the reduced tournament, where they were eliminated by Tristán Suárez.

=== Relegation and Disaffiliations ===
After the 1995 Clausura, the team's performance began to decline, and they began to struggle in the league table. The 1999-00 season was no exception, where they only managed five wins and lost 23 of their 34 matches. On June 3, 2000, after a 2-1 loss to Liniers, they were relegated to the Primera D for the first time in their history with one match remaining, finishing last in the championship and second to last in the league table.

Their return to the bottom division was not a good one: they began the Apertura without a win in the first eight matches, managing only to beat Sportivo Barracas in the ninth and Puerto Nuevo in the 13th, finishing joint-last with Lugano. Meanwhile, in the Clausura, they only managed to beat Muñiz, also finishing last. On April 28, after losing to Claypole, they were disaffiliated for the second time with three matches remaining, finishing last in the average table. On their return for the 2002-03 season they did not show any major changes, achieving only four wins against Claypole, Sportivo Barracas and Deportivo Riestra. On May 18, 2003, despite the victory against Claypole, the team was again relegated with one match remaining, finishing second to last in the Southern Zone and last in the league averages.

After its return in 2004, the team began to show improvement, qualifying in 2005 and 2009 for the Torneo Reducido (Reduced Tournament) for the second promotion.

=== Copa Argentina Debut ===
On August 31, 2011, the club made its Copa Argentina debut, but was quickly eliminated after losing 2–0 to Yupanqui.

On November 7, 2013, they advanced to the Copa Argentina for the first time, defeating Victoriano Arenas on penalties. However, they were later eliminated after losing 5-0 to San Telmo, their best performance at the time and their last in the cup.

=== New disaffiliation ===
Starting in 2009, the team's performance declined again, leaving them struggling in their average starting in 2011, but they managed to stay in the division in 2012 and 2013. In the 2013-14 season, they had a poor start, failing to win in the first twelve rounds; despite achieving four wins in the last five rounds of the first round, they were unable to move away from last place from the start of the competition. In the second half of the season, their performance deteriorated and on April 20, 2014, after Central Ballester's victory, the team was disaffiliated for the fourth time, with three matches left to play, finishing last in the championship and in the averages table. Due to the restructuring of Argentine football, they returned to the division six months later in the 2015 season.

Over time, Deportivo became recognized as "the most popular institution in the Paraguayan community" by its members and by organizations from other communities. The entity is recognized as a social space where different ways of constructing the identity of the Paraguayan community in Buenos Aires are articulated.

In May 2019, the club came under the management of businessman Jhonny Alcoha. Following this change, the club introduced a new administrative and operational approach as part of efforts to improve its performance after a prolonged period without significant results.

=== The return to Primera C ===
In the 2019-20 season, they had a good campaign, after several seasons of weak performance in which they managed to compete in the Clausura Tournament for a place in the championship final. However, the tournament was suspended due to health restrictions caused by the COVID-19 pandemic. Their partial position earned them a place in the first promotion phase of the 2020 transition tournament, where they finished fifth, qualifying for the reduced tournament for the second promotion. There, they won 3-1 against Lugano and on penalties against Sportivo Barracas, but were defeated 2-0 by Atlas in the final.

In January 2023, the AFA resolved the unification of Primera C and Primera D. Thus, the club acquired professional status and returned to Primera C for the 2024 season, 24 years after its last participation.

=== Current Events ===
On November 24, 2024, after losing at home to Berazategui at the José Maria Molaños Stadium in Lugano, the club was disaffiliated for one season with one match remaining. However, at the end of December, the AFA Executive Committee decided to remove the disaffiliation due to the completion of the works on its stadium, where it will exercise the home advantage on its own field of play for the first time in its history for the 2025 season.

== Stadium ==
Since 1992, the club has owned a five-hectare sports field located in González Catán, La Matanza. Construction of its stadium began there.

In February 2024, Dante Majori, president of the AFA Stadium Commission, visited the facilities to inspect the stadium's construction, which was already in its final stages.

On March 17, 2025, the club inaugurated its stadium during the match against Centro Español, in the second round of the Primera C Championship, in a 0-0 draw. The match was played behind closed doors.

== Players ==
=== Current squad ===
As of 1 June 2021

Note: Flags indicate national team as defined under FIFA eligibility rules; some limited exceptions apply. Players may hold more than one non-FIFA nationality.

No.	Pos.	Nation	Player
—	GK	ARG	Braian García Carpio
—	DF	ARG	Agustín Godoy
—	DF	ARG	Manuel Bastos
—	DF	ARG	Fernando Herrera
—	MF	ARG	Franco Maidana
—	DF	ARG	Damián Casas
—	MF	ARG	Kevin Ruiz
—	FW	ARG	Walter Romero
—	FW	ARG	Gastón Aranda
—	MF	ARG	Nahuel González
—	FW	ARG	Carlos Noguera
—	GK	ARG	Martín Mesilla
—	DF	ARG	Facundo Mora
—	DF	ARG	Jonathan Villasanti
—	MF	ARG	Alexis Aranda
—	MF	ARG	Rodrigo Arrúa
—	MF	ARG	Francisco Báez
—	MF	ARG	Julián Moronta
—	MF	ARG	Ramiro Vílchez
—	FW	ARG	Willian Giménez

No.	Pos.	Nation	Player
—	GK	ARG	Agustín Di Biase
—	GK	ARG	Nicolás Brunazzo
—	DF	ARG	Lautaro Arrúa
—	DF	ARG	Uriel Centurión
—	DF	ARG	Agustín Martino
—	DF	ARG	Ezequiel Romero
—	DF	ARG	Nicolás Ruiz
—	MF	ARG	Gabriel Campos
—	MF	ARG	Martín Carpio
—	MF	ARG	Junior Domínguez
—	MF	ARG	Mariano García
—	MF	ARG	Lucas González
—	MF	ARG	Facundo Pogonza
—	MF	ARG	Emiliano Román
—	MF	ARG	Franco Torres
—	FW	ARG	Juan Mendoza
—	FW	ARG	Joaquín Pellico

== Titles ==
- Primera D (1): 1991–92
