= Camilo Ponce Enríquez Canton =

- Canton
- Flag

- Location of Azuay Province in Ecuador.

- Camilo Ponce Enríquez Canton in Azuay Province
- Coordinates: 03°03′S 079°44′W
- Country: Ecuador
- Province: Azuay Province
- Capital: Camilo Ponce Enríquez

Area
  - Total: 214.6 km^{2} (82.9 sq mi)

Population (2022 census)
  - Total: 22,810
  - Density: 106.3/km^{2} (275.3/sq mi)
- Time zone: UTC-5 (ECT)

Camilo Ponce Enríquez Canton is a canton of Ecuador, located in the Azuay Province. The seat of the canton is Camilo Ponce Enríquez.

== Demographics ==
Ethnic groups as of the Ecuadorian census of 2010:

- Mestizo 85.2%
- White 6.6%
- Afro-Ecuadorian 5.5%
- Montubio 1.9%
- Indigenous 0.6%
- Other 0.3%
