= Mario Salas (footballer) =

Chilean footballer and coach (born 1967)

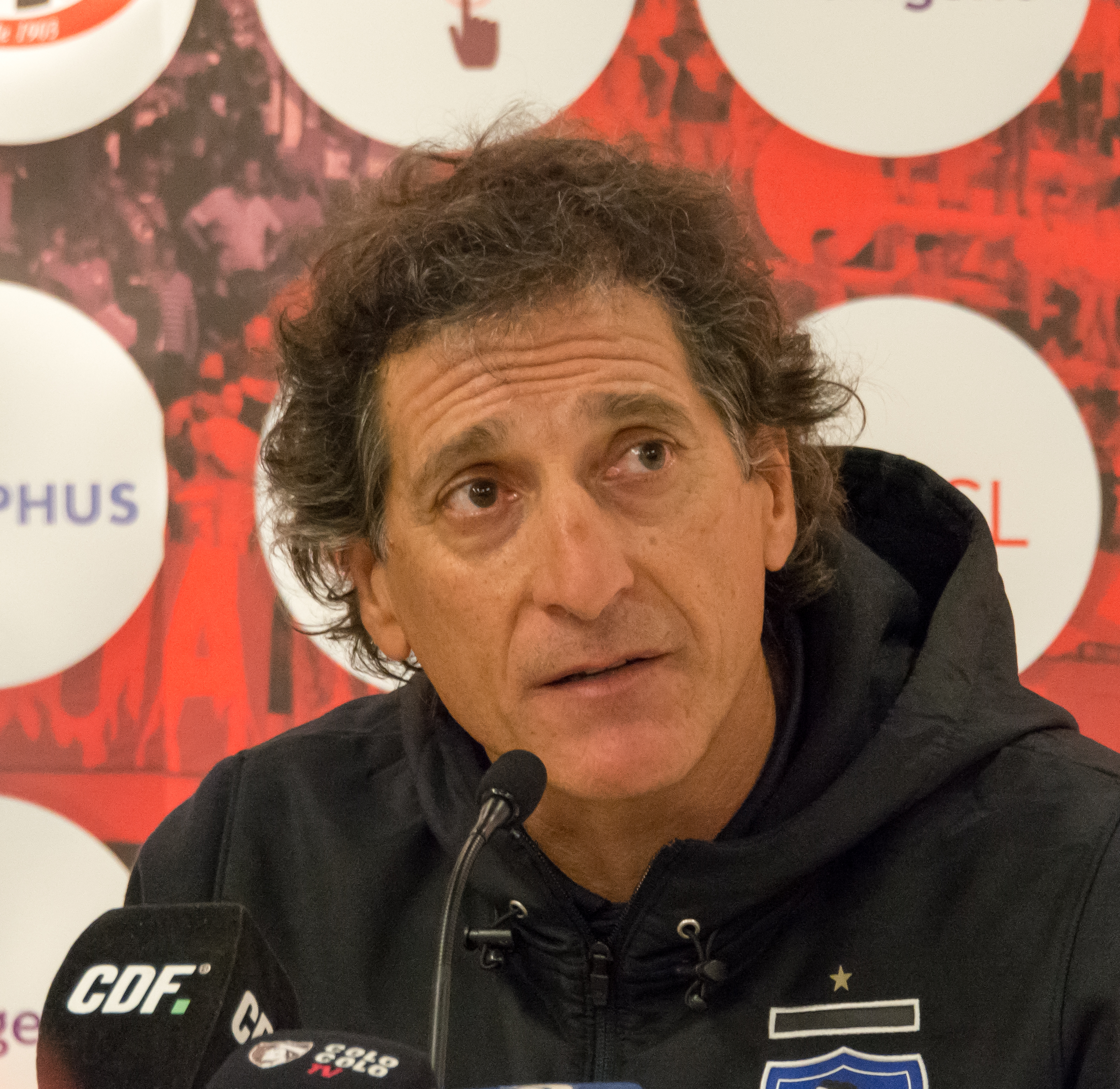
- Mario Salas in 2019

Personal information
- Full name: Mario Alfredo Salas Saieg
- Date of birth: 11 October 1967 (age 59)
- Place of birth: Viña Del Mar, Chile
- Position: Defensive midfielder

Team information
- Current team: Cobreloa (head coach)

Senior career*
Years	Team	Apps	(Gls)
1987–1993	Everton	128	(5)
1993–1994	Unión Española	18	(0)
1995	Palestino	27	(1)
1996–1998	Colo-Colo	64	(0)
1998	Santiago Morning	?	(?)
1999	Santiago Wanderers	28	(0)
2000	Deportes Antofagasta	?	(?)
2001	Everton	?	(?)

International career
1993–1997	Chile	5	(0)

Managerial career
- 2005–2006: Universidad de Concepción (assistant)
- 2008–2007: Unión Española (assistant)
- 2007–2010: Everton (assistant)
- 2010–2012: Barnechea
- 2013: Chile U20
- 2014: Huachipato
- 2015–2017: Universidad Católica
- 2017–2018: Sporting Cristal
- 2019–2020: Colo-Colo
- 2020: Alianza Lima
- 2021: Wadi Degla
- 2021–2022: Huachipato
- 2023: Magallanes
- 2024: Ñublense
- 2025: Deportes Temuco
- 2026–: Cobreloa
- * Club domestic league appearances and goals

Mario Alfredo Salas Saieg (Spanish pronunciation: [ˈmaɾjo ˈsalas], born 11 October 1967) is a Chilean football manager and former player who played as a midfielder. He is the current manager of Cobreloa.

== Career ==
Salas earned five caps for the Chile national team, scoring no goals between 1993 and 1997, and made his debut in 1993 in a friendly match against Spain in Alicante. He started his managerial career at Barnechea in 2009. In 2011, he won the Tercera División de Chile title and the promotion to Primera B. In 2012, he was appointed as head coach of the Chile U20 national team after the resignation of Fernando Carvallo.

As a football coach, Salas started his career as an assistant for Universidad de Concepción, Unión Española and Everton de Viña del Mar.

== Personal life ==
Salas married the personal trainer Nathalie Pizarro in December 2025.

He completed his BA in Physical education at the Pontifical Catholic University of Valparaíso.

== Managerial statistics ==
As of match played 21 November 2026

Managerial record by team and tenure
Team	Nat	From	To	Record							
Team	Nat	From	To	G	W	D	L	GF	GA	GD	Win %
Barnechea	(Chile)	1 April 2011	24 November 2012	80	40	20	20	144	100	+44	50.00
Chile U-20	(Chile)	9 January 2013	7 July 2013	14	8	2	4	24	17	+7	57.14
Huachipato	(Chile)	3 January 2014	14 December 2014	51	22	8	21	84	80	+4	43.14
Universidad Católica	(Chile)	4 January 2015	10 December 2017	134	66	25	43	257	194	+63	49.25
Sporting Cristal	(Peru)	2 April 2017	18 December 2018	50	30	12	8	119	43	+76	60.00
Colo-Colo	(Chile)	18 December 2018	25 February 2020	39	19	8	12	60	46	+14	48.72
Alianza Lima	(Peru)	2 April 2020	30 October 2020	19	3	7	9	20	25	−5	15.79
Wadi Degla	(Egypt)	1 February 2021	27 May 2021	16	4	4	8	15	19	−4	25.00
Huachipato	(Chile)	18 October 2021	10 November 2022	48	19	10	19	55	60	−5	39.58
Magallanes	(Chile)	26 May 2023	20 December 2023	25	10	4	11	40	40	+0	40.00
Ñublense	(Chile)	1 January 2024	24 November 2024	40	15	11	14	60	44	+16	37.50
Deportes Temuco	(Chile)	16 December 2024	4 May 2025	14	2	5	7	12	24	−12	14.29
Cobreloa	(Chile)	15 September 2026	present	8	5	1	2	14	5	+9	62.50
Total				538	243	117	178	904	697	+207	45.17

== Honours ==
=== Player ===
Unión Española

- Copa Chile (1): 1993

Colo-Colo

- Primera División de Chile (3): 1996, 1997 Clausura, 1998
- Copa Chile (1): 1996

=== Manager ===
Barnechea

- Tercera División (1): 2011

Universidad Católica

- Primera División de Chile (2): 2016 Clausura, 2016 Apertura
- Supercopa de Chile (1): 2016

Sporting Cristal

- Peruvian Primera División (1): 2018

Colo-Colo

- Copa Chile (1): 2019
