= A.C. Barnechea =

Chilean football club

Barnechea
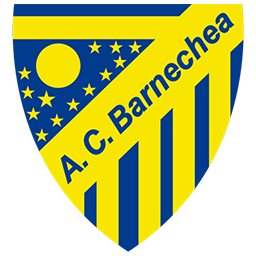
- Full name: Athletic Club Barnechea
- Nicknames: Huaicocheros, Barne
- Founded: December 23, 1929
- Ground: Estadio Municipal Lo Barnechea
- Capacity: 3,000
- Chairman: Armando Cordero
- Manager: Cristián Muñoz
- League: Primera B
- 2023: 9th
Home colours	Away colours

Athletic Club Barnechea is a Chilean Football club based in the Lo Barnechea commune of Santiago, Chile. They currently play in the second level of Chilean football, the Primera B.

== History ==
=== Early Years (1929–1983) ===
The club was founded on December 23, 1929, as Club Deportivo Santa Rosa Lo Barnechea. Its name was changed to Deportivo Lo Barnechea in 1943.

=== Cuarta División (1983–1988) ===
Barnechea was part of the first season of the Chilean Cuarta División in 1983, where it played until 1988. A second-place finish behind Municipal Las Condes that season saw Barnechea promoted to the Chilean Tercera División.

=== Tercera División (1988–2011) ===
In the 2009–10 season the team played the Liguilla de Ascenso, finishing in 3rd place behind Trasandino and Magallanes.

The next season saw Barnechea win the Third Division, finishing 1st in the Liguilla de Ascenso, above Arturo Fernández Vial, Iberia Los Ángeles and Municipal Mejillones.

=== Primera División B (2011–2014) ===
In 2011–12 it played the Chilean Primera División B, finishing in 2nd place with 66 points. It won a place to play the two-legged promotion final against the third-placed Ñublense. After both the first leg (1–1) and second leg (2–2) finished in draws, the play-off went to penalties, where Barnechea lost 7–6.

The club had a final chance at promotion in the relegation play-off against the 16th-placed team of the Chilean Primera División, Cobresal. Barnechea won the first leg 3–1 at the Estadio Santa Laura with goals from Ignacio Caroca and Francisco Ibañez adding to an Eduardo Farías own goal. Agustín Vuletich scored for Cobresal. However, it lost the return leg 3–0 at Estadio El Cobre with a goal from Eduardo Martinez and two from Jose Miguel Cuéllar.

In the season 2013–14, AC Barnechea finished in 4th place with 59 points and won a place in the Play-off for the Second Promotion to the First Division. They defeated Santiago Morning in the semi-finals, winning 2–1 over two legs. In the finals against San Luis, Barnechea won the first leg 1–0 but lost the return fixture by the same score. Their captain and goalkeeper Jorge Manduca scored the decisive penalty in the resulting shoot-out to send Barnechea through to the Chilean Primera División 2014–15 by a 4–3 margin.

=== Primera Division (2014–2015) ===
On August 3, 2014, Nicolas Maturana scored Barnechea's first-ever goal in the top flight against Audax Italiano. A week later, Barnechea won their first match in the First Division, with Francisco Ibañez scoring the only goal in a 1–0 win against San Marcos de Arica.

The club were relegated to Chilean Primera Division B at the end of the 2014–15 season after finishing 18th.

=== Primera División B (2015–2018) ===
Back to the second category, the team started with a triumph before Deportes Concepción, followed by a tie as a visitor to Deportes Iberia and other local before Ñublense. But already in the fourth date, began to notice the fragility of the game – except the win 5–2 before Deportes La Serena as a visitor at the sixth date – where the results did not accompany and the game nor After the bad campaign, where the team was 13 dates without win. While they had a light of hope from the dates 20 and 21, the fall before the champion of the meeting, Deportes Temuco returned to its dark reality, such that the left trembling throughout this stage, until the equipment that came from further back, began to win games and obtain important points in his fight to save the category. The defeat before Coquimbo Unido of visit by 4–2 in the last date, determined its eventual decline to the third category of Chilean soccer, with a meager statistics only 5 wins, 8 draws and 17 defeats, with 25 goals in favor and 54 against, which gave him a difference of −29 and a figure of 23 points of 90 possible (its final performance was a 25.56%), ending the team in the 16th position (last), being relegated to the Segunda División for the season 2016–17. In the following season, the team won the Segunda División, being promoted to the Primera B for 2017, and in 2018, the team reached the semifinals of the Copa Chile for the first time in its history.

== Titles ==
- Segunda División: 1

2016–17

- Tercera División: 1

2011

== Seasons played ==
- 1 season in Primera División
- 4 seasons in Primera División B
- 1 season in Segunda División
- 23 seasons in Tercera División A
- 6 seasons in Tercera División B

== Current squad ==
Current squad of A.C. Barnechea as of 5 October 2021 (edit)
Sources: ANFP Official Web Site

No.		Position	Player
1	CHI	GK	Álvaro Salazar
2	CHI	DF	Cristóbal Finch
3	ARG	DF	Julián Rodríguez
4	CHI	DF	Vicente López
5	ARG	DF	Leonardo Incorvaia
6	CHI	MF	Gino Alucema
7	CHI	FW	Christian Bravo
8	CHI	MF	Jorge Romo
9	CHI	FW	Camilo Ponce
10	ARG	MF	Iván Smith
11	MEX	FW	Steven Almeida
12	CHI	GK	Sebastián Salas
13	CHI	FW	Tomas Dib
14	CHI	MF	Gary Moya
15	CHI	DF	Agustín Volker
16	ARG	FW	Matías Gallegos

No.		Position	Player
17	CHI	MF	Santiago Salaberry
18	CHI	MF	Boris Sagredo
19	CHI	FW	Mateos Mamani
20	CHI	MF	Esteban Carvajal
21	CHI	MF	Cristóbal Marín
22	CHI	GK	Agustin Díaz
23	CHI	DF	Mauro Visaguirre
24	CHI	DF	Luciano Meza
25	CHI	DF	Guillermo Cubillos
26	CHI	DF	Diego Ulloa
27	CHI	FW	Raúl Belmar
28	CHI	FW	Ignacio Herrera
29	CHI	MF	Alessandro Toledo
30	CHI	DF	Rodrigo Osorio
32	CHI	MF	Camilo Rencoret

Manager: John Armijo

=== 2021 Winter Transfers ===
==== In ====
Note: Flags indicate national team as defined under FIFA eligibility rules; some limited exceptions apply. Players may hold more than one non-FIFA nationality.

No.	Pos.	Nation	Player

==== Out ====
Note: Flags indicate national team as defined under FIFA eligibility rules; some limited exceptions apply. Players may hold more than one non-FIFA nationality.

No.	Pos.	Nation	Player
12	GK	CHI	Javier Cordero (to Deportes Colina)

== Managers ==
Interim coaches appear in italics.

- (Chile) Benjamín Valenzuela (1995)
- (Chile) Carlos Encinas (1996)
- (Chile) Rodolfo Dubó (1997-1998)
- (Chile) Fernando Vergara (2005)
- (Chile) Julio Suazo (2008)
- (Chile) Armando Cordero (2009)
- (Chile) Hugo Monardes (2009)
- (Chile) Nelson Soto (2010)
- (Chile) Mario Salas (2011-2012)
- (Chile) Hugo Vilches (2013-2014)
- (Chile) Francisco Bozán (2014-2015)
- (Chile) Jorge Miranda (2016)
- (Chile) Jorge Contreras (2016-2017)
- (Chile) Arturo Norambuena (2017-2018)
- (Chile) René Ávila (2018)
- (Chile) Hernán Peña (2018-2019)
- (Chile) Leonardo Zamora (2020)
- (Chile) Ariel Leporati (2021)
- (Chile) Jaime Pizarro (2021)
- (Argentina) Héctor Adomaitis (2021)
- (Chile) John Armijo (2021-2022)
- (Chile) Antonio Martínez (2023)
- (Chile) Cristián Muñoz (2024-)

== See also ==
- Chilean football league system
