= Trasandino de Los Andes =

Chilean football club

Trasandino
- Full name: Club Deportivo Trasandino de Los Andes
- Nicknames: T-R-A, El Cóndor
- Founded: April 1, 1906; 120 years ago
- Ground: Estadio Regional de Los Andes, Chile
- Capacity: 3,300
- Owner: Harold Mayne-Nicholls
- Chairman: Manuel Rivera
- Manager: César Bravo
- League: Segunda División Profesional
- 2025: 8th
Home colours	Away colours

Trasandino de Los Andes is a Chilean football club, their home town is Los Andes in the V Región of Valparaíso in Chile. They currently play in the Segunda División.

The club was founded on April 1, 1906. Between 1985 and 1992 the club was called Cobreandino. Their home games are played at the Estadio Regional de Los Andes, which has a capacity of 3,313.

== History ==
=== Foundation and years as Trasandino and Cobreandino ===
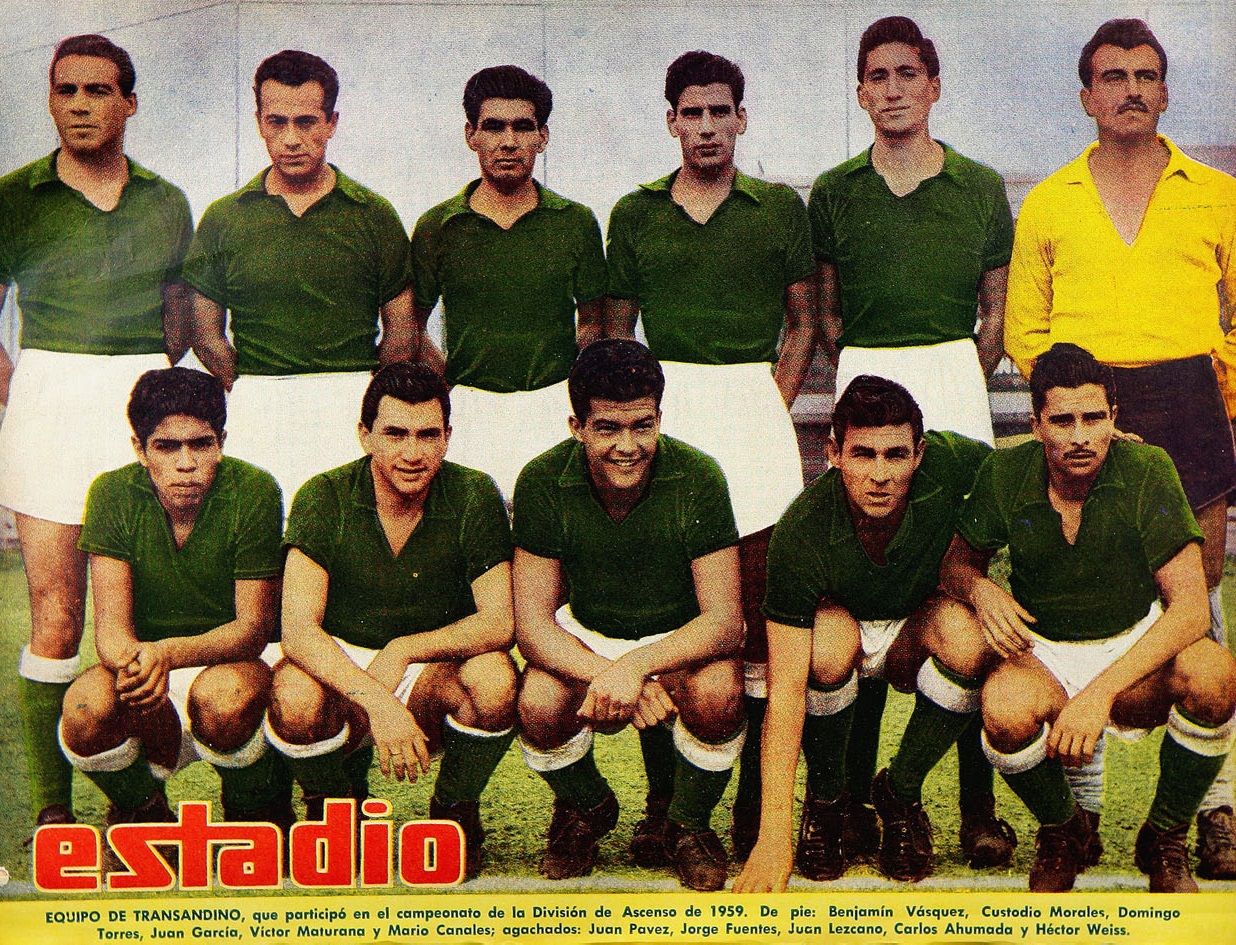
Trasandino de Los Andes featured in Estadio magazine (1959).

The club was founded on 1 April 1906 by workers of the Ferrocarril Trasandino Los Andes–Mendoza. It competed in the Los Andes Association, where it won league titles in 1912 and 1926, followed by eight consecutive championships between 1928 and 1935, as well as titles in 1938 and 1950. In 1943, it also secured the Los Andes Regional Championship.

Between 1949 and 1951, the club participated in the División de Honor Amateur (DIVHA). In 1952, it became one of the founding members of Chile’s professional Segunda División. In 1961, the team finished third in the promotion tournament and would have been promoted on sporting merit; however, the Asociación Central de Fútbol instead granted promotion to Magallanes, despite the latter having finished sixth. Two years later, Trasandino finished as runners-up in the 1963 Segunda División, but promotion was awarded solely to the tournament champions, Green Cross.

Following a poor campaign in 1969, the club finished bottom of the table and returned to its original regional association. In 1972 and 1973, it competed as a guest team in the Regional Central tournament, before rejoining the Segunda División in 1974. Promotion to the Primera División was finally achieved in the 1982 season, after defeating Malleco Unido at the Estadio Ferroviario, in front of 7,530 spectators.

In its first season in the top flight, Trasandino finished 14th out of 22 teams. The most notable results that year were its victories over regional rivals Unión San Felipe, winning 2–1 at home and 3–1 away.

In the 1984 Primera División, the club finished among the bottom four teams in the Zona Sur, level on points with Audax Italiano. As a result, both teams contested a relegation play-off to determine who would remain in the top division. Trasandino lost 3–0 and was relegated to the Segunda División.

The following year, the team recovered and won the 1985 Segunda División title after defeating Fernández Vial 1–0 in a decisive match held in Talca, thereby earning promotion back to the top division. Later that year, the Andina Division of Codelco assumed control of the club, which was renamed Club Deportivo Cobreandino de Los Andes on 28 December 1985. Codelco publicly pledged to build a competitive squad capable of qualifying for the Copa Libertadores.

However, at the start of the following season, after finishing bottom of its group in the 1986 Copa Chile, and under the tournament regulations then in force, the club was relegated once again to the second tier. This marked a rare occurrence in Chilean football history, as Cobreandino—alongside Unión La Calera—became one of the few clubs to suffer relegation through a complementary competition, without having played a single match in the official Primera División championship.

Relegation to the Tercera División followed at the end of the 1991 season, after the club finished eighth in the relegation play-off.

== Titles ==
- Primera B: 1

1985

- Tercera División: 1

2012

- Cuarta División: 1

1992

== Squad ==
As of 16 August 2026 Note: Flags indicate national team as defined under FIFA eligibility rules; some limited exceptions apply. Players may hold more than one non-FIFA nationality.

No.	Pos.	Nation	Player
1	GK	CHI	Sergio Cabello
2	DF	CHI	Santiago Bravo
3	DF	CHI	Joshoa Sotomayor
4	DF	CHI	Juan José Llul
5	DF	CHI	Matías Torres (c)
6	MF	CHI	Marlon Carrasco
7	FW	CHI	Tomás San Martín
8	MF	CHI	Kevin Flores
9	FW	ARG	Emiliano Cuvertino
10	FW	CHI	Javier Quiñones
11	FW	CHI	Benjamín Araneda (loan from Palestino)
12	GK	CHI	Matías Reyes (loan from Deportes Iquique)
13	GK	CHI	Máximo Quiroga
14	DF	CHI	Alan Riquelme
15	FW	CHI	Lucas Poza
16	MF	CHI	Nicolás Letelier (loan from Universidad Católica)

No.	Pos.	Nation	Player
17	DF	CHI	Matías Silva
18	MF	CHI	Vicente González (loan from Palestino)
19	FW	CHI	Agustín Rodríguez (loan from Magallanes)
20	DF	CHI	Martín González (loan from Magallanes)
21	FW	CHI	Fabián Abarca (loan from Magallanes)
22	GK	CHI	Ricardo Patiño (loan from Palestino)
23	MF	ARG	Dylan Fernández
24	FW	CHI	Jordan Mella
25	DF	CHI	Axel Cortés
26	FW	CHI	Sebastián Muñoz
27	FW	CHI	Carlos Navarrete
28	DF	CHI	Jens Buss
29	FW	CHI	Ignacio Parada
30	FW	CHI	Matías Coronado
31	MF	CHI	Oliver Ramis (loan from Cobresal)

== Managers ==
- (Chile) Hugo Jorquera (1952)
- (Chile) Enrique Sorrel (1958)
- (Chile) Pedro Quiroz (1960–1961)
- (Chile) Raúl Pino (1963–1964)
- (Chile) Luis Santibáñez (1968)
- (Chile) (Soviet Union) Sasha Mitjaew (1976)
- (Chile) Hernán Godoy (1978)
- (Chile) Isaac Carrasco (1982–1983)
- (Chile) Jaime Campos (1983)
- (Chile) Gustavo Porta (1983–1984)
- (Chile) Ricardo Contreras (1984)
- (Chile) Hernán Godoy (1984)
- (Chile) Isaac Carrasco (1985–1986)
- (Chile) Jorge Venegas (1987–1988)
- (Chile) Humberto Cruz (1988)
- (Chile) Antonio Vargas (1989–1990)
- (Chile) René Álvarez (1990)
- (Chile) Antonio Vargas (1990)
- (Chile) Jorge Venegas (1991)
- (Chile) Miguel Alegre (1996)
- (Chile) Martín Gálvez (1998)
- (Chile) Gerardo Silva (2001)
- (Chile) Hernán Castro (2002)
- (Chile) Miguel Alegre (2003–2005)
- (Chile) Alejo Rodríguez (2006–2008)
- (Chile) Jaime Nova (2009)
- (Chile) Christian Muñoz (2010)
- (Chile) Miguel Alegre (2011)
- (Chile) Luis Abarca (2012)
- (Chile) Hernán Sáez (2012–2014)
- (Chile) Jorge Miranda (2015)
- (Chile) (Argentina) Sergio Vargas (2015–2016)
- (Argentina) Gerardo Reinoso (2016)
- (Chile) Ricardo González (2016–2018)
- (Chile) Miguel Sánchez (2018)
- (Chile) Christian Muñoz (2019)
- (Chile) Miguel Sánchez (2019–2021)
- (Chile) Luis Pérez (2021)
- (Chile) Francisco Arrué (2022)
- (Chile) César Bravo (2023–2024)
- (Chile) Agustín Almarza (2024)
- (Chile) Ramón Climent (2024)
- (Chile) Agustín Almarza (2025)
- (Chile) Fernando Gutiérrez (2026–Present)
