= Deportes Linares =

Chilean football club

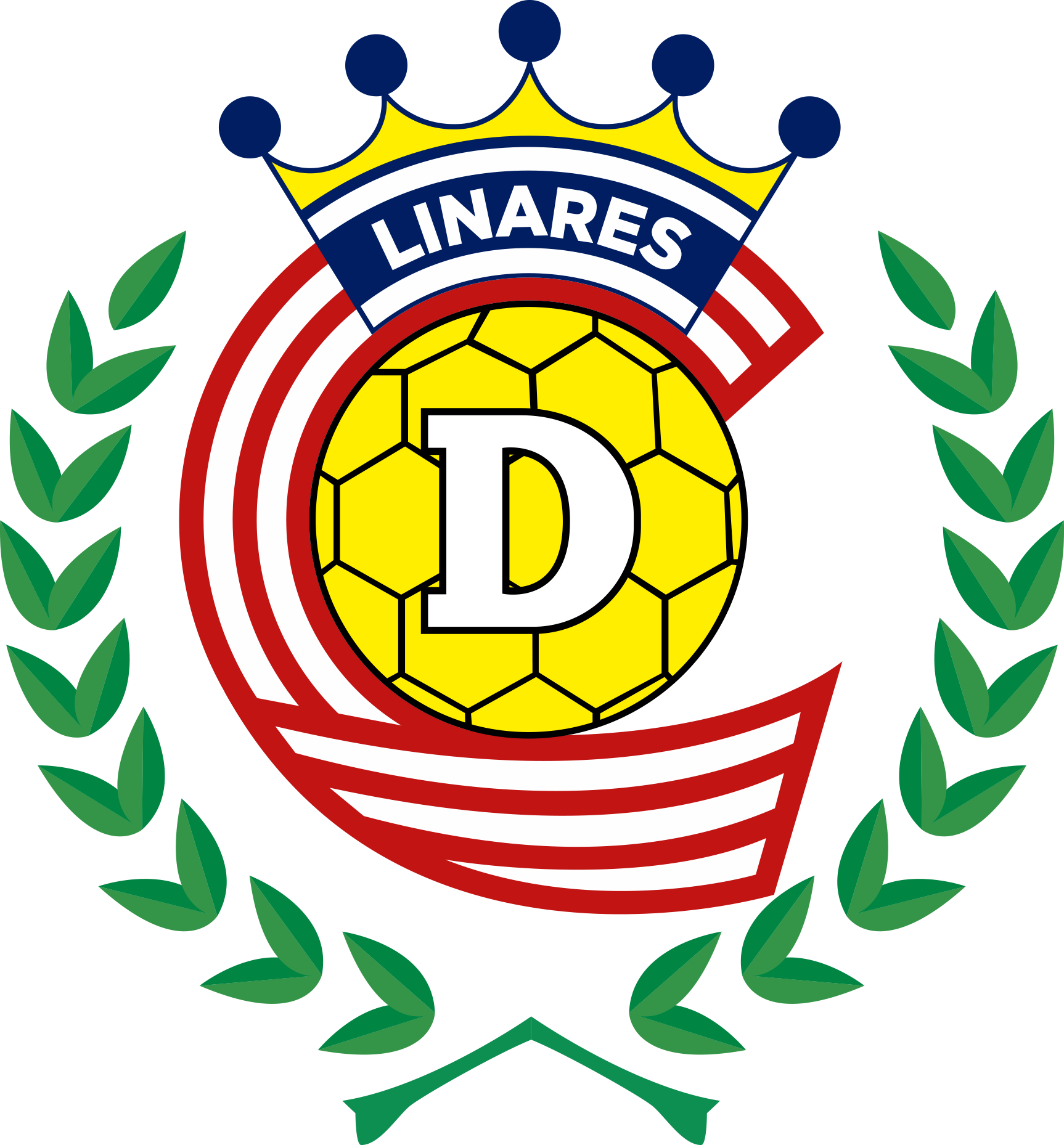
- Full name: Deportes Linares
- Nicknames: Linarenses, Los albirrojos
- Founded: 19 November 1955
- Ground: Estadio Fiscal de Linares, Linares, Chile
- Capacity: 7,000
- Owner: Madhavan Ramakrishnan
- Coach: Rodrigo Melendez
- League: Segunda División
- 2022: 1st (Tercera A, promoted)
Home colours	Away colours

Deportes Linares is a Chilean Football club, their home town is Linares in Chile and play in the 3rd tier of Chilean football, the Segunda División.

The club was founded on November 19, 1955 as Lister Rossel (a famous local pediatrician and amateur sportsman). In 1974 the club name was changed to Deportes Linares.

The year 1992 the team's name was changed again, to be known as Frutilinares.

A new name, this time Linares Unido, was given to the club in 2006. And finally, in 2011, the club took back their current name, Deportes Linares.

Linares lifted the cup in the match against Provincial Ranco after winning 3-0 with 2 great goals from Mauricio cortez at 17', 54' and one from Sergio Bobadilla at 37' and as the cherry on top, debutant goalkeeper Iván Ahumada would save a penalty at the end.

== Seasons ==
- 39 seasons in Primera B
- 12 seasons in Tercera División
- 1 season in Cuarta División

== Honours ==
- Tercera División: 3
  - 1994, 2019, 2022
- Cuarta División: 1
  - 2011

== Squad ==
As of 8 August 2026. Note: Flags indicate national team as defined under FIFA eligibility rules; some limited exceptions apply. Players may hold more than one non-FIFA nationality.

No.	Pos.	Nation	Player
1	GK	CHI	Celso Castillo
2	DF	CHI	Ignacio Sierra
3	DF	CHI	Flavio Rojas
4	DF	CHI	Claudio Fernández
5	DF	CHI	Ignacio Castillo
6	MF	PAN	Julián Rodríguez
7	FW	IRQ	Abdullah Al-Hamidi
8	MF	CHI	José Molina
9	FW	USA	Nathan Hayes
10	MF	ARG	Nicolás Candado
11	FW	CHI	Bastián Gómez (loan from Universidad Católica)
13	DF	CHI	Fernando Valdivia
14	DF	CHI	Baltazar Hernández
15	FW	CHI	Claudio Galaz
16	FW	CHI	Jesús Mercado

No.	Pos.	Nation	Player
18	FW	CHI	Diego Vallejos (c)
19	DF	CHI	Lukas Sepúlveda
20	MF	CHI	Héctor Basoalto
21	MF	CHI	Cristian Arrué
22	FW	CHI	Sebastián Peñaloza
24	MF	CHI	René Meléndez
25	GK	CHI	Branko Gezan
26	FW	CHI	Fils Nsengiyumva
27	FW	CHI	Benjamín Rojas
28	DF	CHI	Patricio Navia
29	FW	CHI	Hugo Toro
30	DF	CHI	Alberto Hernández
32	DF	CHI	Joaquín Aros
33	FW	CHI	Camilo Astroza (loan from Santiago Wanderers)

== Managers ==
- (Paraguay) Ovidio Casartelli
- (Uruguay) Omar Cabral Díaz (1957)
- (Argentina) José Luis Boffi (1958–1960)
- (Argentina) José Luis Boffi (1962–1963)
- (Chile) Guillermo Báez (1964)
- (Chile) Daniel Chirinos (1965)
- (Chile) Tucapel Bustamante (1966)
- (Chile) Ramón Climent Morales (1967)
- (Chile) Tucapel Bustamante (1967–1968)
- (Chile) Guillermo Báez (1969)
- (Chile) José Valdebenito (1971)
- (Chile) Tucapel Bustamante (1971)
- (Chile) Tucapel Bustamante (1974)
- (Chile) Tucapel Bustamante (1976)
- (Chile) (Soviet Union) Sasha Mitjaew (1977)
- (Chile) Tucapel Bustamante (1979)
- (Chile) Jaime Campos (1980)
- (Chile) Tucapel Bustamante (1980–1982)
- (Chile) Jorge Venegas (1982)
- (Chile) Alfonso Sepúlveda (1983)
- (Chile) Tucapel Bustamante (1983–1984)
- (Chile) Víctor Adriazola (1985)
- (Chile) Tucapel Bustamante (1985)
- (Argentina) (Chile) Arturo Rodenak (1988)
- (Chile) Tucapel Bustamante (1988)
- (Chile) Hernán Godoy (1989)
- (Chile) Francisco Graells (1989)
- (Chile) Tucapel Bustamante (1989)
- (Argentina) Hugo Pedraza (1990)
- (Chile) Francisco Graells (1990)
- (Chile) Tucapel Bustamante (1992)
- (Chile) Carlos Durán (1993–1994)
- (Chile) Óscar Zambrano (1994)
- (Chile) Eduardo Apablaza (1995)
- (Chile) Víctor Adriazola (1995)
- (Chile) Rolando García (1995)
- (Chile) Eugenio Jara (1996)
- (Chile) Esaú Bravo (1997)
- (Chile) Juan Páez (1997)
- (Chile) Horacio Rivas (1998)
- (Chile) Ricardo Lee (1999)
- (Chile) Rolando García (1999–2001)
- (Chile) Osvaldo Hidalgo (2005)
- (Chile) Ítalo Díaz (2008)
- (Chile) Jhon Greig (2009–2010)
- (Chile) Jaime Nova (2011–2013)
- (Argentina) Ramiro Míguez (2013–2014)
- (Chile) Jaime Nova (2014–2015)
- (Chile) Héctor Balocchi (2016)
- (Chile) Manuel González (2017–2018)
- (Chile) Leandro Méndez (2018)
- (Chile) Rubén Martínez (2018)
- (Chile) Luis Pérez (2019)
- (Uruguay) Rodolfo Neme (2020)
- (Chile) Mauricio Riffo (2020)
- (Chile) Nibaldo Rubio (2020)
- (Chile) Luis Pérez (2020)
- (Chile) Ramón Climent Labra (2020–2021)
- (Chile) Jaime Nova (2021)
- (Chile) Luis Pérez (2022–2023)
- (Chile) Eduardo Lobos (2023–2024)
- (Chile) Rodrigo Valdés (2024)
- (Chile) Rodrigo Meléndez (2024–2025)
- (Greece) Nikolaos Issaris (2026)
- (Chile) Rodrigo Meléndez (2026–Present)

== See also ==
- Chilean football league system
