= Tercera A (Chile) =

Tercera División
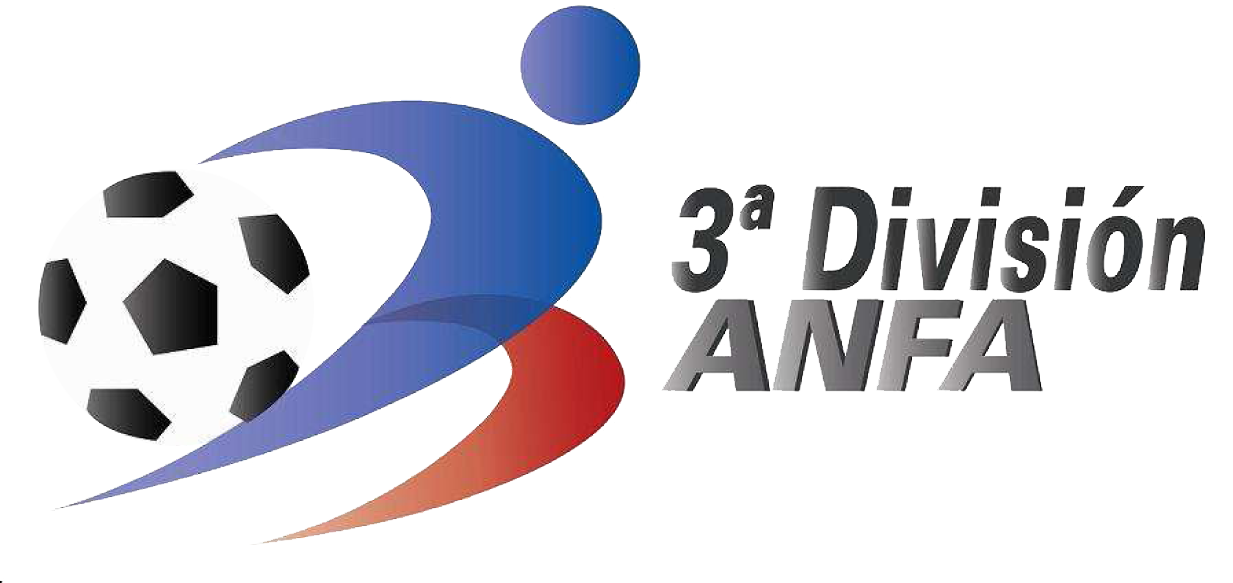
- Chilean third division football logo
- Founded: 1981
- Country: Chile
- Confederation: CONMEBOL
- Number of clubs: 16
- Level on pyramid: 4
- Promotion to: Segunda División
- Relegation to: Tercera B
- Domestic cup: Copa Chile
- Current champions: Santiago City (1st title)
- Most championships: Ñublense, Colchagua, Deportes Linares (3 titles)
- Website: Official webpage

Tercera División de Chile (Third Division of Chile), is the fourth tier of Chilean football (soccer). It is organized by the Federación de Fútbol de Chile and the Asociación Nacional de Fútbol Amateur de Chile. It is both the fourth level of the Chilean football league system and the top league for Chilean Football Youth Leagues.

== Overview ==
In 1979, a commission to access applications for a Third Division amateur league was created by the Federación de Fútbol de Chile. Twenty-five teams throughout the country participated on the first edition of the league in 1981. Since 1997, only players below the age of 23 are allowed to participate.

The winner and the runner-up of the league are promoted to Segunda División.

== League rules ==
Matchday squads in the Tercera División are restricted to players under the age of 23.

== Current teams ==
These are the teams participating in the Chilean Tercera División in the 2025 season:

Club	City	Stadium	Capacity
Aguará	La Reina	Centro Talinay	200
Chimbarongo	Chimbarongo	Municipal de Chimbarongo	1,500
Colchagua	San Fernando	Municipal Jorge Silva Valenzuela	5,900
Comunal Cabrero	Cabrero	Municipal Luis Figueroa Riquelme	3,500
Comercial de Constitución	Constitución	Enrique Donn	2,060
Deportes Colina	Colina	Municipal Manuel Rojas del Río	4,000
Deportes Quillón	Quillón	Complejo Colegio Quillón	
	Nueva Imperial	El Alto de Nueva Imperial	2,000
	Buin	Lautaro de Buin	2,600
Lota Schwager	Coronel	Federico Schwager	4,000
Malleco Unido	Angol	Alberto Larraguibel Morales	2,345
Municipal Mejillones	Mejillones	Municipal de Mejillones	1,500
Municipal Puente Alto	Puente Alto	Municipal de Puente Alto	1,900
Club Juan Fernandez	Juan Fernandez	-Estadio del Verde5,000	
Quintero Unido	Quintero	Raúl Vargas Verdejo	2,500

== Tercera División champions ==
=== As third level of the Chilean League system ===
Ed.	Season	Champion	Runner-up
1	1981	Fernández Vial	Deportes Laja
2	1982	Deportes Laja	Lautaro
3	1983	Súper Lo Miranda	Iván Mayo
4	1984	Santiago Morning	Ñublense
5	1985	Ñublense	Soinca Bata
6	1986	General Velásquez	Iván Mayo
7	1987	Deportes Colchagua	Juventud Ferro
8	1988	Soinca Bata	Deportes Laja
9	1989	Lozapenco	Unión Santa Cruz
10	1990	Unión La Calera	Unión Santa Cruz
11	1991	Unión Santa Cruz	San Luis
12	1992	Ñublense	Curicó Unido
13	1993	Deportes Ovalle	Curicó Unido
14	1994	Deportes Linares	Santiago Morning
15	1995	Magallanes	General Velásquez
16	1996	Santiago Morning	Universidad de Concepción
17	1997	Universidad de Concepción	Barnechea
18	1998	Deportes Colchagua	Barnechea
19	1999	Deportes Talcahuano	Unión La Calera
20	2000	Unión La Calera	Deportes Copiapó
21	2001	Lota Schwager	Deportes Copiapó
22	2002	Deportes Copiapó	Malleco Unido
23	2003	San Luis	Deportes Linares
24	2004	Ñublense	Curicó Unido
25	2005	Curicó Unido	Trasandino
26	2006	Municipal Iquique	Iberia
27	2007	San Marcos de Arica	Deportes Colchagua
28	2008	Naval	Deportes Temuco
29	2009	Unión Temuco	Iberia
30	2010	Magallanes	Trasandino
31	2011	Barnechea	Fernández Vial

=== As fourth level of the Chilean League system ===
Ed.	Season	Champion	Runner-up
32	2012	Trasandino	Deportes Linares
33	2013	Fernández Vial	Deportes Quilicura
34	2014	Deportes Colchagua	Deportes Santa Cruz
35	2015	Independiente	Deportes Vallenar
36	2016	Provincial Osorno	Deportes Recoleta
37	2017	General Velásquez	Fernández Vial
38	2018	Lautaro de Buin	Deportes Colina
39	2019	Deportes Linares	Deportes Concepción
40	2020	Deportes Limache	Rodelindo Román
41	2021	Trasandino	Real San Joaquín
42	2022	Deportes Linares	Provincial Osorno
43	2023	Provincial Ovalle	Concón National
44	2024	Santiago City	Brujas de Salamanca
45	2025	Atlético Colina	

== Titles by Team ==
Club	Titles	Runners-up	Seasons won	Seasons runner-up
Colchagua	3	1	1998, 2013 Apertura, 2013 Clausura	2007
Ñublense	3	1	1985, 1992, 2004	1984
Deportes Linares	3	2	1994, 2019, 2022	2003, 2012
Fernández Vial	2	2	1981, 2013	2011, 2017
Trasandino	2	2	2012, 2021	2005, 2010
General Velásquez	2	1	1986, 2017	1995
Santiago Morning	2	1	1984, 1996	1994
Unión La Calera	2	1	1990, 2000	1999
Magallanes	2	—	1995, 2010	—
Naval	2	—	1999, 2008	—
Unión Santa Cruz	1	3	1991	1989, 1990, 2014
Barnechea	1	2	2011	1997, 1998
Curicó Unido	1	2	2005	1993, 2004
Deportes Copiapó	1	2	2002	2000, 2001
Deportes Laja	1	2	1982	1981, 1988
Atlético Colina	1	1	2025	2018
Deportes Ovalle	1	1	1993	1992
Soinca Bata	1	1	1988	1985
Universidad de Concepción	1	1	1997	1996
Provincial Osorno	1	1	2016	2022
Deportes Limache	1	—	2020	—
Independiente	1	—	2015	—
Lautaro de Buin	1	—	2018	—
Lota Schwager	1	—	2001	—
Lozapenco	1	—	1989	—
Municipal Iquique	1	—	2006	—
Provincial Ovalle	1	—	2023	—
San Luis	1	—	2003	—
San Marcos	1	—	2007	—
Santiago City	1	—	2024	—
Súper Lo Miranda	1	—	1983	—
Unión Temuco	1	—	2009	—

== Tercera División Cup champions ==
Official knock-out competition open to the clubs in the two lower divisions of the Chilean football league system, only played some seasons. The winners gets bonification points for the league tournament.

Year	Champion	Scores	Runner-up	Trophy
1991	Curicó Unido	1–1, 0–0 (4-2p)	Atlético Curacaví	Copa Confraternidad
2006	Deportes Valdivia	1–0	Instituto Nacional	Copa Torneo Apertura
2013	Fernández Vial		Deportes Quilicura	Copa Torneo Apertura
2015	Deportes Rengo	3–0, 2–1	Real San Joaquín	Copa Absoluta
2016	Deportes Colina	2–0, 1–1	Lautaro de Buin	Copa Absoluta
