= Segunda División Profesional de Chile =

- Founded: 2011
- Country: Chile
- Confederation: CONMEBOL
- Number of clubs: 14
- Level on pyramid: 3
- Promotion to: Primera B
- Relegation to: Tercera División A
- Domestic cup: Copa Chile
- Current champions: Deportes Puerto Montt (2nd title) (2025)
- Most championships: Iberia (3 titles)
- Broadcaster(s): TNT Sports
- Website: Official webpage
- Current: 2026

Segunda División Profesional del Fútbol Profesional Chileno (English: Second Professional Division of Chilean Professional Football) is the third level of Chilean football league system, since the season 2012, is organized by the Asociación Nacional de Fútbol Profesional.

The Chilean Segunda División Profesional was established in 2012.

== Current teams ==
These are the teams participating in the Chilean Segunda División, season 2025:

Club	City	Stadium	Capacity
Barnechea	Santiago (Lo Barnechea)	Municipal de Lo Barnechea	2.500
Brujas de Salamanca	Salamanca	Municipal de Salamanca	3.000
Concón National	Concón	Atlético Municipal de Concón	3.000
Deportes Linares	Linares	Fiscal Tucapel Bustamante Lastra	4 000
Deportes Melipilla	Melipilla	Soinca Bata	1 000
Deportes Puerto Montt	Puerto Montt	Regional de Chinquihue	10 000
Deportes Rengo	Rengo	Guillermo Guzmán Díaz	3 000
General Velásquez	San Vicente de Tagua Tagua	Augusto Rodríguez	3 000
Provincial Osorno	Osorno	Municipal Rubén Marcos Peralta	12 000
Provincial Ovalle	Ovalle	Diaguita	5 160
Real San Joaquín	Santiago (San Joaquín)	Municipal de San Joaquín	3 500
San Antonio Unido	San Antonio	Eugenio Castro González	5 000
Santiago City	Santiago (Las Condes)	Municipal de Las Condes	500
Trasandino	Los Andes	Regional de Los Andes	2 800

== Segunda División Champions ==
Ed.	Season	Champion	Runner-up
1	2012	Iberia	Deportes Temuco
2	2013	Iberia	Trasandino
3	2013–14	Iberia	San Antonio Unido
4	2014–15	Deportes Puerto Montt	San Antonio Unido
5	2015–16	Deportes Valdivia	Deportes Santa Cruz
6	2016–17	Barnechea	Deportes Melipilla
7	2017 Transición	Deportes Vallenar	Naval
8	2018	Deportes Santa Cruz	General Velásquez
9	2019	San Marcos de Arica	Deportes Colchagua
10	2020	Fernández Vial	Lautaro de Buin
11	2021	Deportes Recoleta	Iberia
12	2022	San Marcos de Arica	General Velásquez
13	2023	Deportes Limache	Deportes Melipilla
14	2024	Deportes Melipilla	Deportes Concepción
15	2025	Deportes Puerto Montt	Deportes Linares

== Titles by club ==
Club	Titles	Runners-up	Seasons won	Seasons runner-up
Iberia	3	1	2012, 2013, 2013–14	2021
Deportes Puerto Montt	2	—	2014–15, 2025	—
San Marcos de Arica	2	—	2019, 2022	—
Deportes Melipilla	1	2	2024	2016–17, 2023
Deportes Santa Cruz	1	1	2018	2015–16
Barnechea	1	—	2016–17	—
Deportes Limache	1	—	2023	—
Deportes Recoleta	1	—	2021	—
Deportes Valdivia	1	—	2015–16	—
Deportes Vallenar	1	—	2017 Transición	—
Fernández Vial	1	—	2020	—
