= Isaac Carrasco =

Chilean footballer (1928-2004)

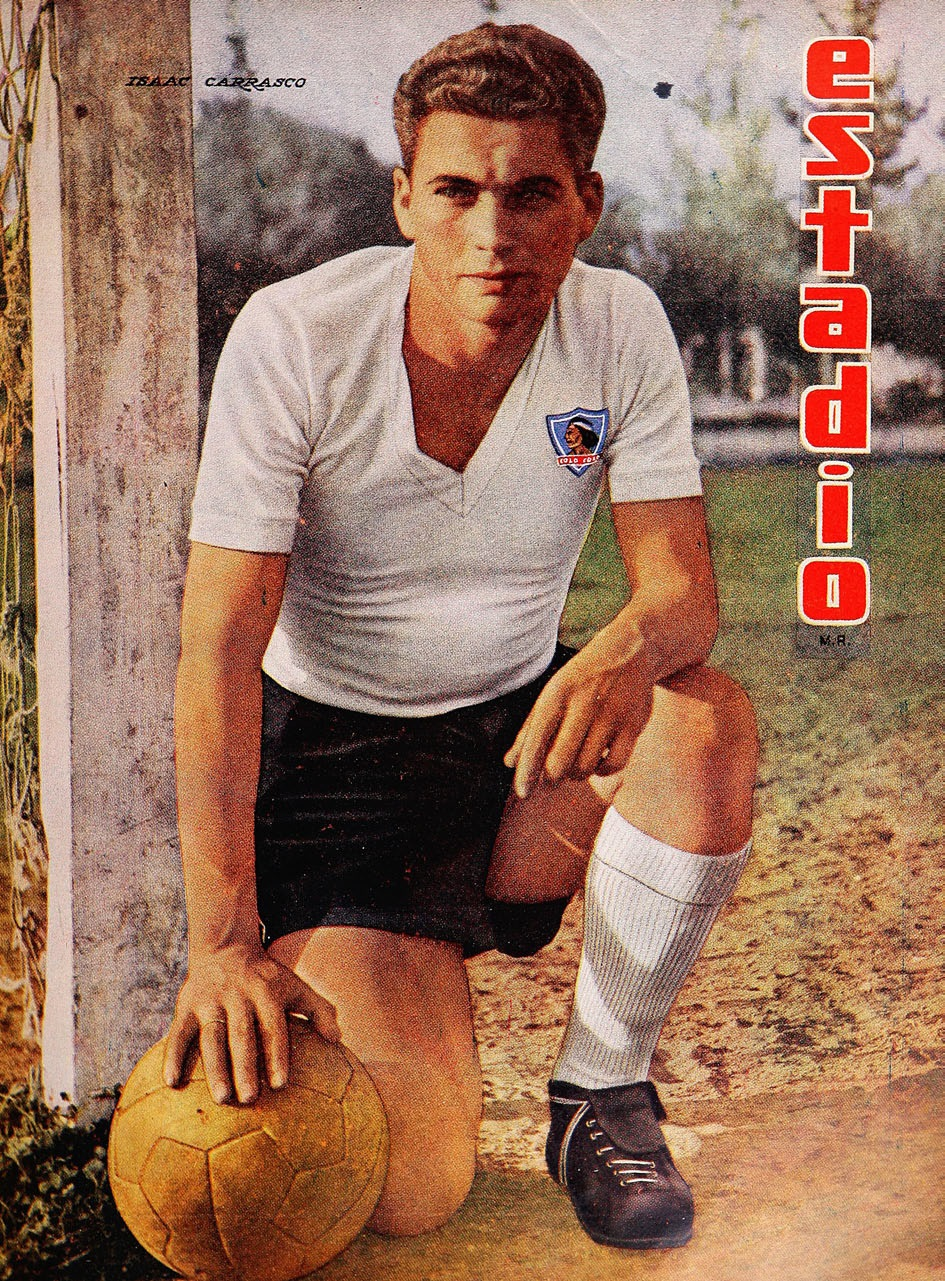

Personal information
- Full name: Isaac Carrasco Rivas
- Date of birth: 14 August 1928
- Place of birth: Mariquina, Chile
- Date of death: 5 April 2004 (aged 75)
- Place of death: La Serena, Chile
- Position: Defender

Senior career*
Years	Team	Apps	(Gls)
1950–1951	Naval		
1952–1952	Audax Italiano		
1954–1959	Colo-Colo		
1960–1964	Santiago Morning		

International career
1951–1956	Chile (amateur)		
1954–1961	Chile	25	(0)

Managerial career
- 1965: Santiago Morning
- 1966: Unión La Calera
- 1967: Deportes Concepción
- 1968: Unión Española
- 1968: Unión San Felipe
- 1968–1969: Lota Schwager
- 1970: Palestino
- 1971–1972: O'Higgins
- 1972: Deportes Ovalle
- 1974–1975: Naval
- 1976: Ñublense
- 1977: Unión San Felipe
- 1978: Deportes Concepción
- 1979: Deportes Arica
- 1980: Santiago Morning
- 1981: Aviación
- 1982–1983: Trasandino
- 1983: Deportes Antofagasta
- 1984: Chile Olympic
- 1984: Chile B
- 1985: Trasandino
- 1986: Audax Italiano
- 1987–1988: Ñublense
- 1988: Magallanes
- 1989–1990: Santiago Wanderers
- 1990–1991: Lota Schwager
- 1994: San Luis
Medal record
Men's football
Representing Chile
Pan American Games
Bronze medal – third place	1951 Buenos Aires	Team
- * Club domestic league appearances and goals

Isaac Carrasco Rivas (14 August 1928 – 5 April 2004) was a Chilean footballer.

== International career ==
He played in 27 matches for the Chile national football team from 1954 to 1961. He was also part of Chile's squad for the 1956 South American Championship.

He also represented Chile at the Pan American Games in 1951 and 1956, winning the bronze medal in the first one.

== Legacy ==
Constituted on 23 November 1956, Carrasco was a leadership member of the Sindicato Profesional de Jugadores de Fútbol (Professional Trade Union of Football Players) in Chile.

== Honours ==
=== Player ===
Chile B

- Pan American Games Bronze medal: 1951

Naval

- Campeonato Regional: 1951

Colo-Colo

- Primera División: 1956
- Copa Chile: 1958

=== Manager ===
Deportes Concepción

- Segunda División: 1967

Lota Schwager

- Segunda División: 1969

Ñublense

- Segunda División: 1976

Trasandino

- Segunda División: 1985
