= Sergio Salgado =

Chilean footballer (born 1958)

Personal information
- Full name: Sergio Mario Salgado Cofré
- Date of birth: 12 September 1958 (age 68)
- Place of birth: Chillán, Chile
- Position: Forward

Senior career*
| Years | Team | Apps | (Gls) |
| 1976–1977 | Unión Española | 0 | (0) |
| 1978 | Iberia-Bío Bío | | |
| 1979 | Unión La Calera | | |
| 1980–1988 | Cobresal | 136+ | (100+) |
| 1989–1991 | Colo Colo | 40 | (9) |
| 1991 | Deportes Antofagasta | 21 | (8) |
| 1992 | Universidad de Chile | 11 | (1) |
| 1993–1996 | Cobresal | 80+ | (77) |
| 1997 | Deportes Arica | | (8) |

International career
| 1977 | Chile U20 | | |
| 1984–1988 | Chile Pre-Olympic | | |
| 1985 | Chile XI | 5 | (1) |
| 1985 | Chile A-2 | 2 | (0) |
| 1985–1989 | Chile | 17 | (3) |
- * Club domestic league appearances and goals

Sergio Mario Salgado Cofré (born September 12, 1958) is a Chilean former footballer who played as a forward.

== Career ==
Salgado played for Unión Española, Iberia-Bío Bío, Unión La Calera, Cobresal, Colo Colo, Deportes Antofagasta, Universidad de Chile, Cobresal and Deportes Arica.

At international level, Salgado represented Chile at both the 1984 and the 1987 Pre-Olympic Tournament. In 1985, he also represented the Chile B-team at the Indonesian Independence Cup and the Los Angeles Nations Cup.

In official matches, Salgado made 17 appearances for the Chile national team between 1985 and 1989.

== Honours ==
Cobresal

- Segunda División de Chile (1): 1983
- Copa Chile (1): 1987

Colo-Colo

- Primera División de Chile (2): 1989, 1990
- Copa Chile (2): 1989, 1990
- Copa Libertadores (1): 1991

Individual

- Segunda División de Chile/Primera B de Chile Top Goalscorer: 1981, 1993, 1995, 1996
- Copa Apertura Segunda División Top Goalscorer: 1982
- Primera División de Chile Top Goalscorer: 1986
- CONMEBOL Pre-Olympic Tournament Top Goalscorer: 1987
- Chilean Footballer of the Year: 1995
