= Campeonato Nacional Primera B =

Chilean association football league

- Founded: 1952
- Country: Chile
- Confederation: CONMEBOL
- Number of clubs: 16
- Level on pyramid: 2
- Promotion to: Liga de Primera
- Relegation to: Segunda División
- Domestic cup: Copa Chile
- Current champions: Cobreloa (2nd title) (2026)
- Most championships: Deportes Temuco (5 titles)
- Broadcaster: TNT Sports
- Website: Official webpage
- Current: 2026 Liga de Ascenso

The Liga de Ascenso, historically known as the Campeonato Nacional Primera B, is the second tier in the Chilean football league system, and is organized by the Asociación Nacional de Fútbol Profesional. It was established in 1952 as Segunda División, and later renamed in 1996 to the current name. Since 1954, automatic promotion to and relegation from the Liga de Primera has been granted, although Palestino and Rangers were promoted to the top flight in the first season.

== Current teams ==
These are the teams participating in the Primera B as of the 2026 season:

Club	City (Commune)	Stadium	Capacity
Cobreloa	Calama	Zorros Del Desierto	12,102
Curicó Unido	Curicó	La Granja	8,000
Deportes Antofagasta	Antofagasta	Regional Calvo y Bascuñán	21,178
Deportes Copiapó	Copiapó	Luis Valenzuela Hermosilla	8,000
Deportes Iquique	Iquique	Tierra de Campeones	14,430
Deportes Puerto Montt	Puerto Montt	Regional de Chinquihue	10,000
Deportes Recoleta	Santiago (Recoleta)	Municipal Leonel Sánchez Lineros	1,000
Deportes Santa Cruz	Santa Cruz	Joaquín Muñoz García	5,000
Deportes Temuco	Temuco	Municipal Germán Becker	18,413
Magallanes	Santiago (San Bernardo)	Municipal Luis Navarro Avilés	3,500
Rangers	Talca	Fiscal de Talca	16,070
San Luis	Quillota	Municipal Lucio Fariña Fernández	7,680
San Marcos de Arica	Arica	Carlos Dittborn	10,000
Santiago Wanderers	Valparaíso	Elías Figueroa Brander	20,575
Unión Española	Santiago (Independencia)	Santa Laura-Universidad SEK	19,887
Unión San Felipe	San Felipe	Municipal de San Felipe	10,000

== List of champions ==
- For the period 1935–1942, see Serie B Profesional
- For the period 1943–1951, see División de Honor Amateur

Ed.	Season		Champion	Runner-up
Segunda División
1	1952		Palestino	Rangers
2	1953		Thomas Bata	América
3	1954		O'Higgins Braden	América
4	1955		San Luis	Unión La Calera
5	1956		Universidad Católica	Deportes La Serena
6	1957		Deportes La Serena	Santiago Morning
7	1958		San Luis	Santiago Morning
8	1959		Santiago Morning	Green Cross
9	1960		Green Cross	Deportes La Serena
10	1961		Unión La Calera	Unión San Felipe
11	1962		Coquimbo Unido	San Antonio Unido
12	1963		Green Cross	Trasandino
13	1964		O'Higgins	Lister Rossel
14	1965		Ferrobadminton	Huachipato
15	1966		Huachipato	Coquimbo Unido
16	1967		Deportes Concepción	Lota Schwager
17	1968		Antofagasta Portuario	San Luis
18	1969		Lota Schwager	Ñublense
19	1970		Unión San Felipe	Iberia
20	1971		Naval	Ñublense
21	1972		Palestino	Ferroviarios
22	1973		Deportes Aviación	Ñublense
23	1974		Santiago Morning	Everton
24	1975		Universidad Católica	Ovalle
25	1976		Ñublense	O'Higgins
26	1977		Coquimbo Unido	Rangers
27	1978		Santiago Wanderers	Naval
28	1979		Deportes Iquique	Magallanes
29	1980		San Luis	Ñublense
30	1981		San Marcos de Arica	Santiago Morning
31	1982		Fernández Vial	Everton
32	1983		Cobresal	San Luis
33	1984		Unión La Calera	Deportes Concepción
34	1985		Trasandino	Fernández Vial
35	1986		Lota Schwager	O'Higgins
36	1987		Deportes La Serena	Deportes Valdivia
37	1988		Rangers	Unión San Felipe
38	1989		Universidad de Chile	Palestino
39	1990		Provincial Osorno	Coquimbo Unido
40	1991		Deportes Temuco	Huachipato
41	1992		Provincial Osorno	Deportes Iquique
42	1993		Rangers	Cobresal
43	1994		Deportes Concepción	Huachipato
44	1995		Santiago Wanderers	Audax Italiano
Primera B
45	1996		Deportes La Serena	Deportes Puerto Montt
46	1997	Apertura	Rangers	Everton
46	1997	Clausura	Deportes Iquique	Everton
47	1999		Cobresal	O'Higgins
48	1999		Unión Española	Santiago Wanderers
49	2000		Unión San Felipe	Rangers
50	2001		Deportes Temuco	Cobresal
51	2002		Deportes Puerto Montt	Universidad de Concepción
52	2003		Everton	La Serena
53	2004		Deportes Melipilla	Deportes Concepción
54	2005		Santiago Morning	Deportes Antofagasta
55	2006		Deportes Melipilla	Ñublense
56	2007		Provincial Osorno	Rangers
57	2008		Curicó Unido	Municipal Iquique
58	2009		Unión San Felipe	Santiago Wanderers
59	2010		Municipal Iquique	Unión La Calera
60	2011		Deportes Antofagasta	Rangers
61	2012		San Marcos de Arica	Ñublense
62	2013		Universidad de Concepción	Curicó Unido
63	2013–14		San Marcos de Arica	Barnechea
64	2014–15		San Luis	Unión San Felipe
65	2015–16		Deportes Temuco	Curicó Unido
66	2016–17		Curicó Unido	San Marcos de Arica
67	2017		Unión La Calera	Deportes Copiapó
68	2018		Coquimbo Unido	Cobreloa
69	2019		Santiago Wanderers	Deportes La Serena
70	2020		Ñublense	Unión San Felipe
71	2021		Coquimbo Unido	Deportes Copiapó
72	2022		Magallanes	Cobreloa
73	2023		Cobreloa	Deportes Iquique
74	2024		Deportes La Serena	Magallanes
Liga de Ascenso
75	2025		Universidad de Concepción	Deportes Copiapó
76	2026		Cobreloa	San Luis

== Titles by club ==
Club	Titles	Runners-up	Seasons won	Seasons runner-up
Deportes La Serena	4	4	1957, 1987, 1996, 2024	1956, 1960, 2003, 2019
San Luis	4	3	1955, 1958, 1980, 2014–15	1968, 1983, 2026
Coquimbo Unido	4	2	1962, 1977, 2018, 2021	1966, 1990
Rangers	3	5	1988, 1993, 1997 Apertura	1952, 1977, 2000, 2007, 2011
Unión San Felipe	3	4	1970, 2000, 2009	1961, 1988, 2014–15, 2020
Deportes Iquique	3	3	1979, 1997 Clausura, 2010	1992, 2008, 2023
Santiago Morning	3	3	1959, 1974, 2005	1957, 1958, 1981
Santiago Wanderers	3	2	1978, 1995, 2019	1999, 2009
Unión La Calera	3	2	1961, 1984, 2017	1955, 2010
Deportes Temuco	3	1	1991, 2001, 2015–16	1959
San Marcos de Arica	3	1	1981, 2012, 2013–14	2016–17
Provincial Osorno	3	—	1990, 1992, 2007	—
Ñublense	2	6	1976, 2020	1969, 1971, 1973, 1980, 2006, 2012
Cobreloa	2	2	2023, 2026	2018, 2022
Cobresal	2	2	1983, 1998	1993, 2001
Curicó Unido	2	2	2008, 2016–17	2013, 2015–16
Deportes Concepción	2	2	1967, 1994	1984, 2004
Deportes Antofagasta	2	1	1968, 2011	2005
Green Cross	2	1	1960, 1963	1959
Lota Schwager	2	1	1969, 1986	1967
Palestino	2	1	1952, 1972	1989
Universidad de Concepción	2	1	2013, 2025	2002
Deportes Melipilla	2	—	2004, 2006	—
Universidad Católica	2	—	1956, 1975	—
Everton	1	4	2003	1974, 1982, 1997 Apertura, 1997 Clausura
Huachipato	1	3	1966	1965, 1991, 1994
O'Higgins	1	3	1964	1976, 1986, 1998
Magallanes	1	2	2022	1979, 2024
Deportes Puerto Montt	1	1	2016–17	1996
Fernández Vial	1	1	1982	1985
Naval	1	1	1971	1978
Trasandino	1	1	1985	1963
Deportes Aviación	1	—	1973	—
Ferrobadminton	1	—	1965	—
Thomas Bata	1	—	1953	—
Unión Española	1	—	1999	—
Universidad de Chile	1	—	1989	—
