= Marcelo Urzúa =

Chilean footballer

Personal information
- Full name: Cristian Marcelo Urzúa Gac
- Date of birth: 9 September 1962 (age 64)
- Place of birth: Chile
- Position: Attacking midfielder

Youth career
- Colo-Colo

Senior career*
Years	Team	Apps	(Gls)
1982	Magallanes	17	(9)
1983	Colo-Colo	0	(0)
1983	Universidad de Chile	6	(1)
1984–1985	Palestino	31	(8)
1986	Rangers	20	(2)
1987–1988	Eendracht Aalst	27	(7)
1988–1989	Diagoras	24	(2)
1989–1990	Naval	10	(3)
1990–1991	Concordia Hamburg	5	(1)
- * Club domestic league appearances and goals

Cristian Marcelo Urzúa Gac (born 9 September 1962), known as Marcelo Urzúa, is a Chilean former footballer who played as an attacking midfielder for clubs in Chile and abroad.

== Career ==
In his homeland, Urzúa played in the top division for Magallanes (1982), Colo-Colo (1983), Universidad de Chile (1983), Palestino (1984–85) and Rangers (1986) before moving abroad.

As player of Colo-Colo, he made one appearance in the 1983 Copa Libertadores match against Cobreloa on 23 March and took part in the 1983 Copa Polla Gol. On second half of the same year, he switched to the traditional rival, Universidad de Chile, becoming the seventh player to make it after Alfonso Domínguez, Javier Mascaró, José Santos Arias, among others.

In 1987, he went to Europa thanks to the Argentine former player of Palestino, José Rubulotta, who also helped another Chilean players to sign in Belgium such as Juan Verdugo, Eloy Vidal and Juvenal Olmos. He played for Eendracht Aalst (1987–88) in Belgium, and for Diagoras (1988–89) in Greece.

After a stint in Chile with Naval (1989–1990), he returned to Europa and played for the German club Concordia Hamburg in 1990–91.
