= Claudio Videla =

Chilean footballer (born 1982)

Personal information
- Full name: Claudio Andrés Videla González
- Date of birth: 12 September 1982 (age 44)
- Place of birth: Rancagua, Chile
- Height: 1.78 m (5 ft 10 in)
- Position: Forward

Youth career
- O'Higgins

Senior career*
Years	Team	Apps	(Gls)
2001–2004	O'Higgins	90	(42)
2002	→ Iberia (loan)	–	(–)
2005	Universidad de Chile	0	(0)
2005	Santiago Wanderers	4	(0)
2005	Universidad de Concepción	15	(4)
2006	Cobresal	23	(4)
2007	Rangers	31	(10)
2008	Santiago Morning	16	(3)
2009	Deportes Concepción	9	(1)
2009	Deportes Melipilla	4	(0)
2010	Rangers	13	(2)
2012	Enfoque	–	(–)
Total		205	(66)

International career
2003	Chile U23	1	(1)
- * Club domestic league appearances and goals

Claudio Andrés Videla González (born 19 September 1982) is a Chilean former footballer who played as a forward.

== Club career ==
A product of the O'Higgins youth system, Videla became the top goalscorer of the Primera B in both the 2003 and the 2004 season.

In the Chilean top division, he played for O'Higgins, Santiago Wanderers, Universidad de Concepción, Cobresal, Santiago Morning, in addition to a brief stint with Universidad de Chile.

In the Primera B, he also played for Rangers, with whom he got the promotion to the top division in 2007, Deportes Concepción and Deportes Melipilla.

In the third level, he had a stint with Iberia. In the fourth level, he played for Enfoque from Rancagua, his last club.

== International career ==
During 2003, Videla was with Chile at under-23 level with views to the 2004 CONMEBOL Pre-Olympic Tournament. He scored a goal in the 2–1 home victory against Colombia on 20 July 2003.

== Post-retirement ==
Videla owns an auto repair shop.

== Honours ==
- Primera B Top-scorer (2): 2003, 2004
