= Constantino Mohor =

Chilean footballer and manager

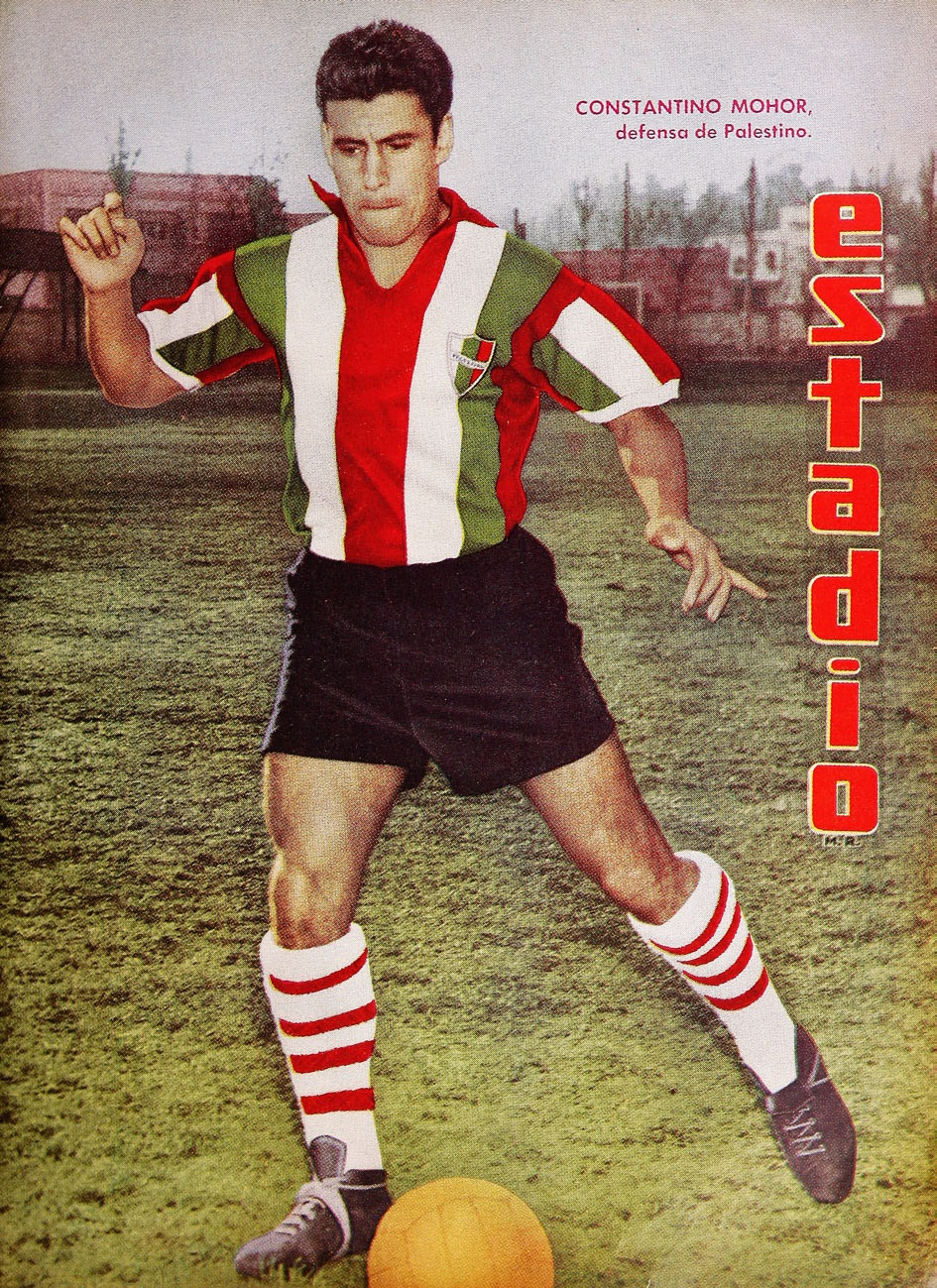

Personal information
- Full name: Constantino Segundo Mohor Sanhueza
- Date of birth: 17 September 1934
- Place of birth: Los Sauces, Chile
- Date of death: 30 December 2018 (aged 84)
- Place of death: Maipú, Chile
- Height: 1.70 m (5 ft 7 in)
- Position: Defensive midfielder

Youth career
- 1950: Escuela Normal Victoria
- 1951–1952: Victoria (city team)
- 1952–1954: University of Concepción
- 1954–1955: Palestino

Senior career*
Years	Team	Apps	(Gls)
1955–1961	Palestino		
1961	Colo-Colo		
1962–1963	Santiago Morning	54	(9)
1964–1965	Calvo Sotelo		
1965–1966	Hospitalet		
1966	Unión La Calera	29	(1)
1967–1968	Deportes Concepción	38	(2)

International career
1958	Chile B	2	(0)
1959–1960	Chile	1	(0)

Managerial career
- 1975: Rangers
- Ñublense
- Guanacasteca
- 1985–1988: General Velásquez
- * Club domestic league appearances and goals

Constantino Segundo Mohor Sanhueza (17 September 1934 – 30 December 2018) was a Chilean football player and manager.

== Club career ==
=== Early years ===
Born in Los Sauces, Chile, Mohor represented the team of the normal school of Victoria commune at the age of 16 and the team of the same city a year later, playing also for the teams of another communes such as Mulchén, Los Ángeles and Traiguén. Then, he represented the team of University of Concepción in regional tournaments where competed teams of industries such as Fanaloza.

=== In Chile ===
He joined Palestino after a trial in 1954 with the Serbian Miodrag (or Milan) Stefanović as coach, winning in 1955 both the Primera División and the reserves national championship.

After playing for Palestino, in October 1961 he played for Colo-Colo. In 1962 he switched to Santiago Morning. In his stint with the club, it is remembered a tragic car accident that he and three fellows suffered in January 1963, when they came back to Santiago after a match against Deportes La Serena, dying his fellow Jorge Huasito Fuenzalida.

After a stint in Spain, he played for Unión La Calera (1966) and Deportes Concepción (1967–68), with whom he won the 1967 Segunda División and got promotion to the top division, being well remembered along with his Argentine fellow Óscar Coll.

=== In Spain ===
Thanks to the journalists Renato González and Raúl Matas, he went to Spain and met entrepreneur Luis Guijarro, getting trials with Atlético Madrid and Real Betis. However, he played in the Segunda División for Calvo Sotelo (1964–65) and Hospitalet (1965–66), where he coincided with his compatriot Jaime Ramírez.

As an anecdote, he was registered as born in 1937 since foreign players over 30 year-old couldn't be signed.

== International career ==
In 1958 he represented a Chile national team that played two friendlies against the Austrian club First Vienna. Then, he took part of Chile squad in the 1959 South American Championship in Buenos Aires. He made his official debut in a friendly match against Uruguay on 5 June 1960.

== Coaching career ==
At professional level, he coached Rangers, Ñublense, among others. In 1986, he won the Chilean Tercera División with General Velásquez. In addition, he has been one of the four Chilean managers who have worked in Costa Rica along with Hugo Tassara, Román Soto and Javier Mascaró, being the coach of Guanacasteca.

Outside of coaching professional clubs, he worked for the Ministry of Sports of Chile and also coached youth teams.

== Personal life ==
His family came to Southern Zone of Chile from Palestine at the end of the 19th century and his father put a shop in Los Sauces.

He graduated as a teacher at the normal school of Victoria, where he coincided with José Santos Arias and Caupolicán Peña, who were footballers and managers later.

== Honours ==
=== As player ===
Palestino (reserves)

- Campeonato Nacional: 1955

Palestino

- Chilean Primera División: 1955

Deportes Concepción

- Chilean Segunda División: 1967

=== As manager ===
General Velásquez

- Chilean Tercera División: 1986
