= 1976 Campeonato Nacional Segunda División =

Segunda División
- Season: 1976
- Champions: Ñublense
- Promoted: Ñublense; O'Higgins; Audax Italiano
- Relegated: None

The 1976 Segunda División de Chile was the 25th season of the Segunda División de Chile.

Ñublense was the tournament's champion.

== First stage ==
=== Group North ===
Pos	Team	Pld	W	D	L	GF	GA	GD	Pts	Qualification
1	Audax Italiano	21	10	7	4	26	17	+9	27	Qualified to Promotion Playoffs
2	Trasandino	21	9	6	6	43	35	+8	24	Qualified to Promotion Playoffs
3	Coquimbo Unido	21	9	6	6	34	27	+7	24	Qualified to Promotion Playoffs
4	San Antonio Unido	21	9	4	8	29	38	−9	22	Qualified to Promotion Playoffs
5	Ferroviarios	21	7	7	7	43	36	+7	21	
6	San Luis de Quillota	21	6	9	6	24	24	0	21	
7	Unión San Felipe	21	6	4	11	29	34	−5	16	
8	Unión La Calera	21	3	7	11	24	41	−17	13	

Source: rsssf.com

=== Group South ===
Pos	Team	Pld	W	D	L	GF	GA	GD	Pts	Qualification
1	O'Higgins	21	9	11	1	36	18	+18	29	Qualified to Promotion Playoffs
2	Ñublense	21	9	8	4	30	22	+8	26	Qualified to Promotion Playoffs
3	Magallanes	21	7	11	3	30	21	+9	25	Qualified to Promotion Playoffs
4	Malleco Unido	21	7	9	5	25	21	+4	23	Qualified to Promotion Playoffs
5	Iberia	21	6	9	6	30	24	+6	21	
6	Curicó Unido	21	7	5	9	28	39	−11	19	
7	Linares Unido	21	2	9	10	25	43	−18	13	
8	Independiente de Cauquenes	21	3	6	12	30	46	−16	12	

Source: rsssf.com

== Promotion Playoffs ==
Pos	Team	Pld	W	D	L	GF	GA	GD	Pts	Promotion or qualification
1	Ñublense	14	7	5	2	21	12	+9	19	Campeón. Asciende a Primera División
2	O'Higgins	14	7	4	3	18	12	+6	18	Asciende a Primera División
3	Trasandino	14	6	3	5	23	17	+6	15	Qualification la Liguilla de promoción
4	Audax Italiano	14	6	3	5	21	17	+4	15	Qualification la Liguilla de promoción
5	Coquimbo Unido	14	6	2	6	11	13	−2	14	
6	Malleco Unido	14	5	3	6	15	16	−1	13	
7	Magallanes	14	5	2	7	17	24	−7	12	
8	San Antonio Unido	14	2	2	10	16	31	−15	6	

Source: rsssf.com

== Relegation playoffs ==
Pos	Team	Pld	W	D	L	GF	GA	GD	Pts	Qualification
9	San Luis de Quillota	14	8	2	4	23	21	+2	18	
10	Linares Unido	14	6	5	3	21	17	+4	17	
11	Independiente de Cauquenes	14	6	4	4	26	18	+8	16	
12	Unión La Calera	14	7	1	6	22	20	+2	15	
13	Ferroviarios	14	4	4	6	28	28	0	12	
14	Iberia	14	3	6	5	15	16	−1	12	
15	Curicó Unido	14	3	6	5	17	29	−12	12	
16	Unión San Felipe	14	3	4	7	23	26	−3	10	Suspended Relegation

Source: rsssf.com

== Primera División de Chile Relegation Playoffs ==
The teams qualified to the 1976 Primera División de Chile Relegation Playoffs were the teams placed in Championship Playoff's 3rd and 4th place respectively (Trasandino and Audax Italiano) and the teams placed in 1976 Primera División's 15th and 16th position (Huachipato y Rangers).

Pos	Team	Pld	W	D	L	GF	GA	GD	Pts	Promotion or relegation
1	Huachipato	3	2	0	1	9	4	+5	4	
2	Audax Italiano (C)	3	2	0	1	7	4	+3	4	Promoted to 1977 Primera División de Chile
3	Trasandino	3	2	0	1	7	7	0	4	
4	Rangers (R)	3	0	0	3	2	10	−8	0	Relegated to 1977 Segunda División de Chile

Source: rsssf.com
(C) Champions; (R) Relegated

== See also ==
- Chilean football league system
