= 1988 Campeonato Nacional Segunda División =

Segunda División
- Season: 1988
- Champions: Rangers
- Promoted: Rangers; Unión San Felipe
- Relegated: Malleco Unido

The 1988 Segunda División de Chile was the 37th season of the Segunda División de Chile.

Rangers was the tournament's champion.

== Aggregate table ==
Pos	Team	Pld	W	L	GF	GA	GD	BP	Pts	Qualification
1	Coquimbo Unido	22	14	8	22	17	+5	12	40	Qualified to North Zone – Promotion Playoffs
2	Unión San Felipe	22	14	8	32	24	+8	11	39	Qualified to North Zone – Promotion Playoffs
3	Santiago Wanderers	22	13	9	27	17	+10	12	38	Qualified to North Zone – Promotion Playoffs
4	Deportes Arica	22	12	10	35	30	+5	11	35	Qualified to North Zone – Promotion Playoffs
5	San Luis de Quillota	22	11	11	30	27	+3	13	35	Qualified to North Zone – Promotion Playoffs
6	Magallanes	22	11	11	24	25	−1	12	34	Qualified to North Zone – Promotion Playoffs
7	Deportes Antofagasta	22	10	12	21	23	−2	14	34	Qualified to North Zone – Relegation Playoffs
8	Unión La Calera	22	10	12	25	20	+5	12	32	Qualified to North Zone – Relegation Playoffs
9	Deportes Ovalle	22	10	12	24	34	−10	10	30	Qualified to North Zone – Relegation Playoffs
10	Regional Atacama	22	10	12	23	33	−10	7	27	Qualified to North Zone – Relegation Playoffs
11	Audax Italiano	22	8	14	31	33	−2	10	26	Qualified to North Zone – Relegation Playoffs
12	Cobreandino	22	9	13	21	32	−11	8	26	Qualified to North Zone – Relegation Playoffs

Source: globalsportsarchive.com

=== South Zone ===
Pos	Team	Pld	W	L	GF	GA	GD	BP	Pts	Qualification
1	Rangers	22	15	7	33	15	+18	16	46	Qualified to South Zone – Promotion Playoffs
2	Deportes Temuco	22	15	7	22	25	−3	10	40	Qualified to South Zone – Promotion Playoffs
3	Lota Schwager	22	12	10	30	16	+14	15	39	Qualified to South Zone – Promotion Playoffs
4	Iberia Biobío	22	12	10	28	23	+5	15	39	Qualified to South Zone – Promotion Playoffs
5	Provincial Osorno	22	13	9	31	30	+1	11	37	Qualified to South Zone – Promotion Playoffs
6	Curicó Unido	22	13	9	33	22	+11	10	36	Qualified to South Zone – Promotion Playoffs
7	Deportes Linares	22	10	12	23	28	−5	9	29	Qualified to South Zone – Relegation Playoffs
8	Deportes Puerto Montt	22	10	12	23	30	−7	8	28	Qualified to South Zone – Relegation Playoffs
9	Ñublense	22	7	15	23	25	−2	13	27	Qualified to South Zone – Relegation Playoffs
10	General Velásquez	22	9	13	21	28	−7	8	26	Qualified to South Zone – Relegation Playoffs
11	Deportes Colchagua	22	8	14	22	31	−9	10	26	Qualified to South Zone – Relegation Playoffs
12	Malleco Unido	22	8	14	13	29	−16	7	23	Qualified to South Zone – Relegation Playoffs

Source: globalsportsarchive.com

=== North Zone – Promotion Playoffs ===
Pos	Team	Pld	W	L	GF	GA	GD	BP	Pts	Promotion or qualification
1	Unión San Felipe	10	5	5	15	8	+7	47	57	Promoted to 1989 Chilean Primera División
2	Deportes Arica	10	8	2	15	12	+3	40	56	Qualified to Promotion Playoffs
3	Coquimbo Unido	10	5	5	16	9	+7	45	55	
4	Santiago Wanderers	10	4	6	14	17	−3	43	51	
5	San Luis de Quillota	10	5	5	12	17	−5	39	49	
6	Magallanes	10	3	7	9	18	−9	37	43	

Source: globalsportsarchive.com

=== North Zone – Relegation Playoffs ===
Pos	Team	Pld	W	L	GF	GA	GD	BP	Pts	Qualification
7	Deportes Antofagasta	10	7	3	17	8	+9	41	55	
8	Cobreandino	10	6	4	11	11	0	31	43	
9	Deportes Ovalle	10	4	6	4	9	−5	35	43	
10	Unión La Calera	10	4	6	7	11	−4	34	42	
11	Regional Atacama	10	5	5	12	17	−5	32	42	
12	Audax Italiano	10	4	6	15	10	+5	32	40	Qualified to Relegation Playoffs

Source: globalsportsarchive.com

=== South Zone – Promotion Playoffs ===
Pos	Team	Pld	W	L	GF	GA	GD	BP	Pts	Promotion or qualification
1	Rangers	10	8	2	11	6	+5	52	68	Promoted to 1989 Chilean Primera División
2	Deportes Temuco	10	6	4	18	14	+4	45	57	Qualified to Promotion Playoffs
3	Lota Schwager	10	6	4	14	14	0	43	55	
4	Iberia Biobío	10	3	7	12	13	−1	45	51	
5	Provincial Osorno	10	4	6	15	18	−3	40	48	
6	Curicó Unido	10	3	7	7	12	−5	42	48	

Source: globalsportsarchive.com

=== South Zone – Relegation playoffs ===
Pos	Team	Pld	W	L	GF	GA	GD	BP	Pts	Qualification
7	Deportes Puerto Montt	10	7	3	24	12	+12	36	50	
8	Deportes Linares	10	5	5	7	10	−3	33	43	
9	General Velásquez	10	5	5	14	14	0	32	42	
10	Ñublense	10	5	5	11	12	−1	31	41	
11	Deportes Colchagua	10	5	5	16	18	−2	30	40	
12	Malleco Unido	10	3	7	11	17	−6	27	33	Qualified to Relegation Playoffs

Source: globalsportsarchive.com

== See also ==
- Chilean football league system
