= Cristian Olivares (footballer, born 1980) =

Chilean footballer

Personal information
- Full name: Cristian Andrés Olivares Cifuentes
- Date of birth: 19 September 1980 (age 46)
- Place of birth: Santiago, Chile
- Height: 1.81 m (5 ft 11 in)
- Position: Defender

Youth career
- 1993–1998: Cobresal

Senior career*
Years	Team	Apps	(Gls)
1999–2004	Universidad de Concepción		
2004	→ Fernández Vial (loan)		(6)
2005	Palestino	5	(0)
2006	Ñublense		
2007	Rangers	33	(1)
2008	Unión San Felipe	21	(1)
2008	Villa Española	7	(1)
2009	Deportes Melipilla	31	(2)
2010	Coquimbo Unido	20	(1)
2011	Rangers	30	(2)
2012	Coquimbo Unido	5	(1)
2013	San Antonio Unido	20	(3)

Managerial career
- 2013: Universidad de Chile (youth)
- 2015–2016: Rangers (youth)
- 2016–2017: Naval (assistant)
- 2017–: Universidad de Concepción (youth)
- * Club domestic league appearances and goals

Cristian Andrés Olivares Cifuentes (born 19 September 1980) is a Chilean former professional footballer who played as a defender.

== Playing career ==
As a youth player, Olivares was with a Cobresal Academy based in Maipú from 1993 to 1998. He made his professional debut playing for Universidad de Concepción, staying at the club until 2004, with a stint on loan at Fernández Vial in the last year.

In Chile, he also played for Palestino, Ñublense, Rangers, Unión San Felipe, Deportes Melipilla, Coquimbo Unido and San Antonio Unido, what was his last club in the Segunda División Profesional, becoming the team captain.

Although he did not win any league titles, he got promotion to the Chilean Primera División four times along with Universidad de Concepción in 2002, Ñublense in 2006 and Rangers in both 2007 and 2011. In addition, along with Universidad de Concepción he qualified to the 2004 Copa Libertadores.

Abroad, he had a stint with Villa Española in the Uruguayan Primera División on second half 2008.

== Coaching career ==
Following his retirement as a football player, Olivares worked as coach for the Universidad de Chile youth ranks on second half 2013. After he graduated as a football manager at the INAF (National Football Institute), he has worked as coach of the youth ranks of both Rangers and Universidad de Concepción as well as assistant coach in Naval.

He also led the Universidad Católica Academy based in Chiguayante and has worked for other institutions such as Club de Campo Bellavista and Federico Santa María Technical University.
