= 1981 Campeonato Nacional Segunda División =

Segunda División
- Season: 1981
- Champions: Deportes Arica
- Promoted: Deportes Arica; Santiago Morning; Regional Atacama; Rangers
- Relegated: None
- Top goalscorer: Sergio Salgado (27 goals); Cobresal

The 1981 Segunda División de Chile was the 30th season of the Segunda División de Chile.

Deportes Arica was the tournament's champion.

== Table ==
Pos	Team	Pld	W	D	L	GF	GA	GD	Pts	Promotion or relegation
1	Deportes Arica	42	20	12	10	66	53	+13	54 (Note: Awarded 2 bonus points.)	Champions. Promoted to 1982 Primera División de Chile
2	Santiago Morning	42	18	16	8	75	63	+12	53 (Note: Awarded 1 bonus point.)	Promoted to 1982 Primera División de Chile
3	Aviación	42	20	12	10	68	42	+26	52	Promoted to 1982 Primera División de Chile
4	Regional Atacama	42	20	11	11	66	46	+20	51	Promoted to 1982 Primera División de Chile
5	Rangers	42	18	13	11	65	53	+12	49	1981 Primera División de Chile promotion/relegation playoffs
6	Coquimbo Unido	42	19	11	12	52	44	+8	49	1981 Primera División de Chile promotion/relegation playoffs
7	Deportes Antofagasta	42	18	12	12	68	62	+6	48	
8	Linares Unido	42	20	6	16	72	57	+15	47	
9	Trasandino	42	19	7	16	56	52	+4	46	
10	Cobresal	42	15	13	14	80	60	+20	43	
11	Huachipato	42	16	11	15	71	59	+12	43	
12	Unión La Calera	42	14	14	14	67	61	+6	42	
13	Talagante Ferro	42	14	14	14	43	39	+4	42	
14	Lota Schwager	42	15	12	15	48	52	−4	42	
15	Green Cross-Temuco	42	12	14	16	50	54	−4	38	
16	Santiago Wanderers	42	15	7	20	48	63	−15	37	
17	Iberia Biobío	42	10	14	18	45	58	−13	34	
18	Deportes Ovalle	42	12	10	20	42	56	−14	34	
19	Malleco Unido	42	12	9	21	49	68	−19	33	
20	San Antonio Unido	42	8	15	19	46	68	−22	31	
21	Deportes Colchagua	42	7	17	18	40	77	−37	31	
22	Unión San Felipe	42	8	14	20	45	75	−30	30	Relegated to 1982 Tercera División de Chile

Source: rsssf.com

== See also ==
- Chilean football league system
