= Edgar Melo =

Chilean footballer (born 1987)

Personal information
- Full name: Edgar Alexander Melo Carrillo
- Date of birth: 19 October 1987 (age 39)
- Place of birth: Cañete, Chile
- Height: 1.76 m (5 ft 9 in)
- Position: Midfielder

Youth career
- 2002–2006: Huachipato

Senior career*
Years	Team	Apps	(Gls)
2007–2008	Huachipato	21	(2)
2008	→ Deportes Valdivia (loan)	21	(2)
2009–2012	Naval	70	(6)
2013–2014	Deportes Concepción	38	(4)
2014–2015	Deportes Puerto Montt	19	(4)
2015–2017	Iberia	0	(0)
2017–2018	Malleco Unido	38	(13)
Total		207	(31)
- * Club domestic league appearances and goals

Edgar Alexander Melo Carrillo (born 19 October 1987) is a Chilean former footballer. His last club was Malleco Unido.
