= Esteban Sáez =

Chilean footballer (born 1989)

Personal information
- Full name: Esteban Andrés Sáez Moncada
- Date of birth: 6 January 1989 (age 37)
- Place of birth: Santiago, Chile
- Height: 1.79 m (5 ft 10 in)
- Position: Defender

Youth career
- Palestino

Senior career*
Years	Team	Apps	(Gls)
2007–2009	Palestino	34	(3)
2010	Cobresal	23	(3)
2011	Unión San Felipe	25	(0)
2012	Unión La Calera	2	(0)
2013	River Plate (UY)	0	(0)
2013–2014	Rangers	12	(0)
2014–2015	Lota Schwager	20	(1)
2015–2016	Iberia	9	(1)
2016–2017	Malleco Unido	22	(1)
2017–2019	Deportes Valdivia	36	(2)
2020	Deportes Puerto Montt	13	(0)
2021	Fernández Vial	11	(0)
Total		207	(11)

International career
2009	Chile U20	2	(0)
- * Club domestic league appearances and goals

Esteban Andrés Sáez Moncada (born 6 January 1989) is a Chilean former footballer who played as a defender.

== Club career ==
With an extensive career in Chilean football, he also had a brief stint with Uruguayan side River Plate in 2013.

He retired at the end of the 2021 season and his last club was Chilean Primera B side Fernández Vial.

== International career ==
He represented Chile U20 at the 2009 South American Championship. In addition, he was part of training processes of Chile at under-17 and under-23 levels. Also, he was a sparring player of the Chile senior team managed by Marcelo Bielsa.
