= 2004 Campeonato Nacional Primera B =

Primera B de Chile
- Season: 2006
- Champions: Deportes Melipilla
- Promoted: Deportes Melipilla; Deportes Concepción
- Top goalscorer: Claudio Videla (18)

The 2004 Primera B de Chile was the 54th completed season of the Primera B de Chile.

Deportes Melipilla was the tournament's champions.

== Qualification ==
=== North Zone ===
Pos	Team	Pld	W	D	L	GF	GA	GD	Pts
1	Deportes Antofagasta	16	6	6	4	23	16	+7	24
2	Deportes Copiapó	16	6	4	6	21	20	+1	22
3	Deportes Ovalle	16	4	10	2	16	13	+3	19 (Note: 3 points deducted for failing to pay players on time)
4	Deportes Arica	16	4	7	5	22	24	−2	19
5	San Luis Quillota	16	5	3	8	17	26	−9	18

=== Central Zone ===
Pos	Team	Pld	W	D	L	GF	GA	GD	Pts
1	Santiago Morning	16	7	5	4	24	19	+5	26
2	Unión La Calera	16	7	4	5	24	22	+2	25
3	O'Higgins	16	6	4	6	28	25	+3	22
4	Deportes Melipilla	16	6	3	7	33	32	+1	21
5	Magallanes	16	3	6	7	28	39	−11	15

=== South Zone ===
Pos	Team	Pld	W	D	L	GF	GA	GD	Pts
1	Deportes Concepción	16	7	6	3	28	18	+10	27
2	Naval	16	7	5	4	23	18	+5	26
3	Provincial Osorno	16	7	3	6	23	23	0	24
4	Arturo Fernández Vial	16	4	5	7	21	27	−6	17
5	Lota Schwager	16	4	3	9	23	32	−9	15

== Second phase ==
=== North Zone ===
Pos	Team	Pld	W	D	L	GF	GA	GD	Pts	Qualification
1	Deportes Melipilla	28	15	4	9	50	41	+9	49	Qualified for Promotion Playoffs
2	Unión La Calera	28	13	6	9	46	38	+8	45	Qualified for Promotion Playoffs
3	Deportes Copiapó	28	11	7	10	37	33	+4	40	Qualified for Promotion Playoffs
4	Magallanes	28	9	8	11	46	52	−6	35	
5	Deportes Antofagasta	28	8	11	9	36	30	+6	32 (Note: 3 points deducted for not paying players on time)	
6	Deportes Ovalle	28	7	13	8	26	31	−5	28	
7	Deportes Arica	28	6	9	13	34	49	−15	27 (Note: 6 points deducted for not paying players on time)	

=== South Zone ===
Pos	Team	Pld	W	D	L	GF	GA	GD	Pts	Qualification
1	Naval	30	14	11	5	46	33	+13	53	Qualified for Promotion Playoffs
2	Deportes Concepción	30	12	11	7	44	38	+6	47	Qualified for Promotion Playoffs
3	O'Higgins	30	12	9	9	56	43	+13	45	Qualified for Promotion Playoffs
4	Santiago Morning	30	12	9	9	46	34	+12	45	
5	Provincial Osorno	30	11	9	10	39	41	−2	42	
6	Arturo Fernández Vial	30	8	9	13	38	45	−7	33	
7	San Luis	30	9	5	16	41	58	−17	26 (Note: 6 points deducted for not paying players on time)	
8	Lota Schwager	30	8	5	17	41	60	−19	23	

=== Promotion Playoffs ===
Pos	Team	Pld	W	D	L	GF	GA	GD	Pts	Promotion
1	Deportes Melipilla	10	5	5	0	19	8	+11	20	Promoted to Primera División de Chile
2	Deportes Concepción	10	4	3	3	12	11	+1	15	Promoted to Primera División de Chile
3	Unión La Calera	10	4	3	3	13	16	−3	15	
4	Deportes Copiapó	10	3	2	5	14	19	−5	11	
5	O'Higgins	10	2	5	3	10	11	−1	11	
6	Naval	10	2	2	6	10	13	−3	8	

== See also ==
- Chilean football league system
