= 2003 Campeonato Nacional Primera B =

Primera B de Chile
- Season: 2003
- Champions: Everton
- Promoted: Everton; Deportes La Serena
- Top goalscorer: Claudio Videla (23)

The 2003 Primera B de Chile was the 53rd completed season of the Primera B de Chile.

== Table ==
| Pos | Team | Pld | W | D | L | GF | GA | GD | BP | Pts |
|---|---|---|---|---|---|---|---|---|---|---|
| 1 | Everton (P) | 30 | 19 | 6 | 5 | 65 | 37 | +28 | 3 | 66 |
| 2 | Deportes La Serena (P) | 30 | 16 | 6 | 8 | 62 | 47 | +15 | 5 | 59 |
| 3 | Deportes Antofagasta | 30 | 14 | 7 | 9 | 50 | 39 | +11 | 6 | 55 |
| 4 | O'Higgins | 30 | 12 | 11 | 7 | 48 | 38 | +10 | 6 | 53 |
| 5 | Deportes Concepción | 30 | 14 | 6 | 10 | 54 | 49 | +5 | 5 | 53 |
| 6 | Deportes Melipilla | 30 | 13 | 7 | 10 | 44 | 38 | +6 | 3 | 49 |
| 7 | Provincial Osorno | 30 | 13 | 6 | 11 | 42 | 41 | +1 | 1 | 46 (Note: 4 bonus points with 3 deducted for not paying players on time) |
| 8 | Santiago Morning | 30 | 9 | 12 | 9 | 37 | 31 | +6 | 4 | 43 |
| 9 | Unión La Calera | 30 | 9 | 8 | 13 | 41 | 45 | −4 | 7 | 42 |
| 10 | Deportes Copiapó | 30 | 11 | 7 | 12 | 43 | 49 | −6 | 2 | 42 (Note: 5 bonus points with 3 deducted for not paying players on time) |
| 11 | Fernández Vial | 30 | 11 | 7 | 12 | 39 | 46 | −7 | 2 | 42 (Note: 8 bonus points with 6 deducted for not paying players on time) |
| 12 | Magallanes | 30 | 8 | 13 | 9 | 46 | 41 | +5 | 3 | 40 |
| 13 | Deportes Talcahuano | 30 | 10 | 7 | 13 | 30 | 40 | −10 | −1 | 36 (Note: 2 bonus points with 3 deducted for not paying players on time) |
| 14 | Deportes Arica | 30 | 8 | 8 | 14 | 47 | 65 | −18 | −1 | 31 |
| 15 | Lota Schwager | 30 | 7 | 4 | 19 | 38 | 60 | −22 | 3 | 28 |
| 16 | Deportes Ovalle | 30 | 4 | 9 | 17 | 39 | 59 | −20 | −1 | 20 (Note: 5 bonus points with 6 deducted for not paying players on time) |

Rules for classification: Teams were awarded half the first phase points as a bonus.
(P) Promoted

== See also ==
- Chilean football league system
