= John Munizaga =

Chilean footballer (born 1985)

Personal information
- Full name: John Manuel Munizaga Maturana
- Date of birth: 11 June 1985 (age 41)
- Place of birth: Viña del Mar, Chile
- Height: 1.78 m (5 ft 10 in)
- Position: Midfielder

Team information
- Current team: Iberia

Youth career
- Everton

Senior career*
| Years | Team | Apps | (Gls) |
| 2006–2009 | Everton | 4 | (0) |
| 2005–2006 | → Limache (loan) | 26 | (1) |
| 2013–2014 | Naval | 38 | (2) |
| 2012–2013 | Lota Schwager | 37 | (0) |
| 2013 | Deportes Copiapó | 27 | (0) |
| 2014–2016 | Iberia | 31 | (0) |
- * Club domestic league appearances and goals as of 25 July 2015

John Manuel Munizaga Maturana (born 11 June 1985) is a Chilean former footballer.

He started his career at Everton, and his last club was Iberia.

His twin brother Freddy is also a footballer.
