= José Lafrentz =

Chilean footballer (born 1992)

Personal information
- Full name: José Francisco Lafrentz Marusich
- Date of birth: 19 October 1992 (age 34)
- Place of birth: Santiago, Chile
- Height: 1.97 m (6 ft 6 in)
- Position: Goalkeeper

Youth career
- 2008–2010: Santiago Wanderers

Senior career*
Years	Team	Apps	(Gls)
2014–2016	Santiago Wanderers	4	(0)
2014–2015	→ Concepción (loan)	5	(0)
2015–2016	→ Santiago Morning (loan)	7	(0)
2016–2017	Lorca B	17	(0)
2017	Lorca	4	(0)
- * Club domestic league appearances and goals as of 21 May 2017

José Francisco Lafrentz Marusich (born 19 October 1992) is a Chilean footballer who plays as a goalkeeper. He is nicknamed Pepo.

== Club career ==
Born in Santiago, Chile, Lafrentz joined Santiago Wanderers youth ranks aged 15. In 2013, he was on trial with Eredivisie club Twente thanks the recommendation of his close friend Felipe Gutiérrez to Enschede-based side board. He even was on the bench one league match.

He made his professional debut on 23 February 2014 against Unión La Calera in a 1–0 home win at Estadio Elías Figueroa Brander coming as a substitute for Mauricio Viana in the 53rd minute because his injury. After three consecutive games as starter, Lafrentz lost it following a terrible mistake against Universidad Católica where he had a feeble resistance at Darío Bottinelli free kick goal. That game Wanderers was defeated 2–0.

After not being considered by coach Emiliano Astorga to face the 2014–15 season, Lafrentz was loaned to second-tier club Deportes Concepción from the Primera B de Chile. There he played twelve games where was challenging the post with Paraguayan first-choice Cristián Limenza. In May 2015, he was loaned again to Santiago Morning, from the second-tier too.

Lafrentz signed for Spanish club Lorca in the start of 2017.

== Personal life ==
He is grandson of Santiago Wanderers president Jorge Lafrentz and in February 2016 it was reported that he is studying business engineering at Adolfo Ibáñez University.
