= Juan Verdugo (Chilean footballer) =

Chilean footballer (born 1949)

Personal information
- Full name: Juan René Verdugo Toledo
- Date of birth: 24 November 1949 (age 76)
- Place of birth: Quilpué, Chile
- Position: Attacking midfielder

Youth career
- Estrella de Plata

Senior career*
Years	Team	Apps	(Gls)
1970–1972	San Luis		
1973	Unión La Calera		
1974–1976	Santiago Wanderers	78	(7)
1977	Regional Antofagasta	30	(2)
1978–1979	Audax Italiano	55	(5)
1980–1983	Waregem	39	(1)
1983	SC Wielsbeke		
- * Club domestic league appearances and goals

Juan René Verdugo Toledo (born 24 November 1949) is a Chilean former professional footballer who played as attacking midfielder for clubs in Chile and Belgium.

== Career ==
As a youth player, Verdugo was with Estrella de Plata in his city of birth. Next, he played for San Luis and Unión La Calera in the Chilean Segunda División before joining Santiago Wanderers in 1974.

A well remembered player of Santiago Wanderers (1974–76), they were the runner-up in the 1974 Copa Chile.

In his homeland, he also played for Regional Antofagasta and Audax Italiano in the top division before moving to Belgium.

He went to Europa thanks to the Argentine former player of Palestino, José Rubulotta, who also helped another Chilean players to sign in Belgium such as Marcelo Urzúa, Eloy Vidal and Juvenal Olmos. In Belgium, he played for Waregem (1980–83) in the First Division, where he coincided with well-known Belgian players such as Marc and Luc Millecamps, Philippe Desmet, Hervé Delesie and Daniel Veyt. His last club was SC Wielsbeke in 1983.

== Personal life ==
He made his home in Belgium and has taken part of friendly activities such as aid for Haiti.
