= 2000 Campeonato Nacional Primera B =

Primera B de Chile
- Season: 2000
- Champions: Unión San Felipe
- Promoted: Unión San Felipe; Rangers
- Relegated: Deportes Linares
- Top goalscorer: Gustavo Biscayzacú (18)

The 2000 Primera B de Chile was the 50th completed season of the Primera B de Chile.

== Table ==
Pos	Team	Pld	W	D	L	GF	GA	GD	Pts	Promotion or relegation
1	Unión San Felipe (C)	30	14	10	6	42	32	+10	52	Promoted to 2001 Primera División de Chile
2	Rangers	30	16	7	7	54	31	+23	55	Promoted to 2001 Primera División de Chile
3	Deportes Talcahuano	30	13	9	8	43	41	+2	48	
4	Fernández Vial	30	14	7	9	41	32	+9	49	
5	Deportes Antofagasta	30	14	7	9	41	32	+9	49	
6	Deportes Melipilla	30	11	9	10	42	43	−1	42	
7	Deportes Ovalle	30	12	9	9	49	33	+16	45	
8	Cobresal	30	12	6	12	44	51	−7	42	
9	Deportes Arica	30	9	10	11	41	45	−4	37	
10	Universidad de Concepción	30	11	5	14	34	42	−8	38	
11	Deportes Iquique	30	12	4	14	44	53	−9	40	
12	Deportes Linares	30	7	10	13	48	45	+3	31	
13	Deportes Temuco	30	9	12	9	38	36	+2	39	
14	Magallanes	30	7	10	13	36	50	−14	31	
15	Deportes La Serena	30	7	10	13	37	44	−7	31	
16	Ñublense	30	3	10	17	32	60	−28	19	Relegated to Tercera División

(C) Champions

== See also ==
- Chilean football league system
