= Fernando Quiroz (Chilean footballer) =

Chilean footballer (born 1997)

Personal information
- Full name: Fernando Andrés Quiroz Calderón
- Date of birth: 9 September 1997 (age 29)
- Place of birth: Chile
- Position: Midfielder

Team information
- Current team: Iberia
- Number: 14

Senior career*
Years	Team	Apps	(Gls)
2015–2021	Deportes Temuco	17	(0)
2019–2021	→ Iberia (loan)	37	(5)
2021	San Antonio Unido	10	(1)
2022–	Iberia	4	(0)
- * Club domestic league appearances and goals as of 16 May 2022

Fernando Andrés Quiroz Calderón (born 9 September 1997) is a Chilean footballer who plays for Deportes Iberia in the Segunda División Profesional de Chile.
