= Juan Verdugo =

Juan Verdugo may refer to:

- Juan Verdugo (Spanish footballer) (born 1949), Spanish football manager and former defender
- Juan Verdugo (Chilean footballer) (born 1949), Chilean football attacking midfielder
