= 1973 Campeonato Nacional Segunda División =

Segunda División
- Season: 1973
- Champions: Aviación
- Promoted: Avación
- Relegated: Deportes Colchagua

The 1973 Segunda División de Chile was the 22nd season of the Segunda División de Chile.

Aviación was the tournament's champion.

== Table ==
| Pos | Team | Pld | W | D | L | GF | GA | GD | Pts | Promotion or relegation |
|---|---|---|---|---|---|---|---|---|---|---|
| 1 | Deportes Aviación (C) | 26 | 15 | 8 | 3 | 36 | 19 | +17 | 38 | Champions. Promoted to 1972 Primera División de Chile. |
| 2 | Ñublense | 26 | 14 | 9 | 3 | 44 | 26 | +18 | 37 | |
| 3 | Everton | 26 | 14 | 6 | 6 | 51 | 20 | +31 | 34 | |
| 4 | Santiago Morning | 26 | 12 | 9 | 5 | 44 | 29 | +15 | 33 | |
| 5 | Deportes Ovalle | 26 | 11 | 8 | 7 | 40 | 30 | +10 | 30 | |
| 6 | Coquimbo Unido | 26 | 9 | 12 | 5 | 32 | 27 | +5 | 30 | |
| 7 | Audax Italiano | 26 | 11 | 5 | 10 | 43 | 32 | +11 | 27 | |
| 8 | Lister Rossel | 26 | 7 | 9 | 10 | 31 | 40 | −9 | 23 | |
| 9 | San Antonio Unido | 26 | 8 | 7 | 11 | 34 | 47 | −13 | 23 | |
| 10 | San Luis de Quillota | 26 | 5 | 9 | 12 | 24 | 35 | −11 | 19 | |
| 11 | Independiente de Cauquenes | 26 | 7 | 5 | 14 | 31 | 43 | −12 | 19 | |
| 12 | Ferroviarios | 26 | 4 | 10 | 12 | 29 | 39 | −10 | 18 | |
| 13 | Iberia | 26 | 5 | 7 | 14 | 24 | 50 | −26 | 17 | |
| 14 | Deportes Colchagua (R) | 26 | 6 | 4 | 16 | 23 | 49 | −26 | 16 | Relegated |

Source: rsssf.com
(C) Champions; (R) Relegated

== See also ==
- Chilean football league system
