= 2006 Campeonato Nacional Primera B =

Primera B de Chile
- Season: 2006
- Champions: Deportes Melipilla
- Promoted: Deportes Melipilla; Ñublense; Lota Schwager
- Top goalscorer: Patricio Morales (18)

The 2006 Primera B de Chile was the 56th completed season of the Primera B de Chile.

Deportes Melipilla was the tournament's champions. The other teams promoted were Ñublense (runner-up under Melipilla in the league's promotion playoffs) and Lota Schwager following beat C.S.D. Rangers in the shootout during the 2006 Primera División de Chile relegation playoffs. That match had to Cristián Limenza as the best, who saved two penalty kicks to Juan Cisternas and Miguel Ayala in the shootout. Nevertheless, on August 27, 2006, Magallanes lost the category and was relegated to Tercera División de Chile after being defeated 2–0 by Deportivo Temuco.

== First phase ==
| Pos | Team | Pld | W | D | L | GF | GA | GD | Pts | Qualification |
|---|---|---|---|---|---|---|---|---|---|---|
| 1 | Deportes Melipilla | 22 | 13 | 5 | 4 | 37 | 16 | +21 | 44 | Qualified to Championship Playoffs |
| 2 | Lota Schwager | 22 | 13 | 5 | 4 | 35 | 23 | +12 | 44 | Qualified to Championship Playoffs |
| 3 | San Luis Quillota | 22 | 10 | 8 | 4 | 27 | 16 | +11 | 38 | Qualified to Championship Playoffs |
| 4 | Curicó Unido | 22 | 9 | 10 | 3 | 25 | 20 | +5 | 37 | Qualified to Championship Playoffs |
| 5 | Ñublense | 22 | 10 | 5 | 7 | 37 | 27 | +10 | 35 | Qualified to Championship Playoffs |
| 6 | Fernández Vial | 22 | 9 | 6 | 7 | 35 | 27 | +8 | 33 | Qualified to Championship Playoffs |
| 7 | Unión La Calera | 22 | 7 | 8 | 7 | 28 | 27 | +1 | 29 | Qualified to Championship Playoffs |
| 8 | Unión San Felipe | 22 | 6 | 10 | 6 | 24 | 29 | −5 | 28 | Qualified to Championship Playoffs |
| 9 | Deportes Copiapó | 22 | 4 | 10 | 8 | 30 | 38 | −8 | 22 | Qualified to Relegation Playoffs |
| 10 | Provincial Osorno | 22 | 4 | 9 | 9 | 32 | 42 | −10 | 21 | Qualified to Relegation Playoffs |
| 11 | Deportivo Temuco | 22 | 5 | 3 | 14 | 24 | 36 | −12 | 15 (Note: 3 points deducted for not playing players) | Qualified to Relegation Playoffs |
| 12 | Magallanes | 22 | 2 | 5 | 15 | 11 | 44 | −33 | 11 | Qualified to Relegation Playoffs |

Source: RSSSF

== Second phase ==
=== Promotion playoffs ===
| Pos | Team | Pld | W | D | L | GF | GA | GD | Pts | Promotion or qualification |
|---|---|---|---|---|---|---|---|---|---|---|
| 1 | Deportes Melipilla | 36 | 17 | 12 | 7 | 53 | 29 | +24 | 63 | Champions. Promoted to 2007 Primera División de Chile season |
| 2 | Ñublense | 36 | 18 | 9 | 9 | 57 | 38 | +19 | 63 | Promoted to 2007 Primera División de Chile season |
| 3 | Lota Schwager | 36 | 17 | 8 | 11 | 55 | 43 | +12 | 58 (Note: 1 point deducted for using an ineligible player) | Qualifies to Primera División de Chile Promotion Playoffs |
| 4 | Fernández Vial | 36 | 15 | 8 | 13 | 53 | 49 | +4 | 53 | Qualifies to Primera División de Chile Promotion Playoffs |
| 5 | San Luis Quillota | 36 | 12 | 15 | 9 | 45 | 40 | +5 | 52 (Note: 1 point added?) | |
| 6 | Curicó Unido | 36 | 11 | 19 | 6 | 40 | 36 | +4 | 52 | |
| 7 | Unión La Calera | 36 | 10 | 16 | 10 | 48 | 47 | +1 | 46 | |
| 8 | Unión San Felipe | 36 | 10 | 12 | 14 | 45 | 51 | −6 | 42 | |

Source: RSSSF

=== Relegation playoffs ===
| Pos | Team | Pld | W | D | L | GF | GA | GD | Pts |
|---|---|---|---|---|---|---|---|---|---|
| 9 | Deportes Copiapó | 28 | 8 | 11 | 9 | 39 | 41 | −2 | 35 |
| 10 | Deportivo Temuco | 28 | 8 | 6 | 14 | 29 | 37 | −8 | 27 (Note: 3 points deducted for not paying players) |
| 11 | Provincial Osorno | 28 | 4 | 12 | 12 | 36 | 50 | −14 | 24 |
| 12 | Magallanes | 28 | 2 | 8 | 18 | 14 | 53 | −39 | 14 |

== See also ==
- Chilean football league system
