= José Acevedo (footballer) =

Chilean footballer (born 1985)

Personal information
- Full name: José Miguel Acevedo Garrido
- Date of birth: 11 December 1985 (age 40)
- Place of birth: Rancagua, Chile
- Height: 1.80 m (5 ft 11 in)
- Position: Goalkeeper

Youth career
- O'Higgins
- Universidad Católica

Senior career*
Years	Team	Apps	(Gls)
2007–2008	Deportes Santa Cruz	38	(0)
2009–2014	Naval	42	(1)
2012–2014	→ Cobreloa (loan)	5	(0)
2014–2015	Deportes Valdivia	29	(0)
2015–2016	Deportes Copiapó	0	(0)
2016–2017	Malleco Unido	30	(0)
2017	Iberia	0	(0)
2018	Malleco Unido	25	(0)
Total		169	(1)
- * Club domestic league appearances and goals

José Miguel Acevedo Garrido (born 11 December 1985) is a Chilean former footballer. His last club was Malleco Unido in the Segunda División Profesional de Chile.
