= 1983 Campeonato Nacional Segunda División =

Segunda División
- Season: 1983
- Champions: Cobresal
- Promoted: Cobresal; San Luis de Quillota; Deportes La Serena; Coquimbo Unido
- Relegated: Deportes Colchagua; Santiago Morning; Ñuble Unido; San Antonio Unido
- Top goalscorer: Hermes Navarro (24 goals); General Velásquez

The 1983 Segunda División de Chile was the 32nd season of the Segunda División de Chile.

Cobresal was the tournament's champion.

== Table ==
Pos	Team	Pld	W	D	L	GF	GA	GD	Pts	Promotion or relegation
1	Cobresal	33	23	9	1	67	18	+49	56 (Note: Awarded 1 bonus point)	Champions. Promoted to 1984 Primera División de Chile
2	San Luis de Quillota	33	17	9	7	53	32	+21	44	Promoted to 1984 Primera División de Chile.
3	Deportes Laja	33	15	12	6	55	38	+17	42	Qualified for 1983 Primera División de Chile promotion/relegation playoffs
4	Malleco Unido	33	12	16	5	47	30	+17	40	Qualified for 1983 Primera División de Chile promotion/relegation playoffs
5	Deportes La Serena	33	15	10	8	54	46	+8	40	Qualified for 1983 Primera División de Chile promotion/relegation playoffs
6	Coquimbo Unido	33	14	9	10	58	38	+20	38	Qualified for 1983 Primera División de Chile promotion/relegation playoffs
7	Lota Schwager	33	14	9	10	40	41	−1	37	
8	Deportes Victoria	33	12	12	9	43	35	+8	36	
9	Unión La Calera	33	13	10	10	51	44	+7	36	
10	Deportes Concepción	33	14	8	11	43	39	+4	36	
11	Deportes Linares	33	11	12	10	56	50	+6	34	
12	Deportes Puerto Montt	33	11	11	11	45	47	−2	33	
13	Quintero Unido	33	11	9	13	40	47	−7	31	
14	Unión Santa Cruz	33	10	10	13	57	58	−1	30	
15	Deportes Valdivia	33	9	12	12	40	48	−8	30	
16	General Velásquez	33	9	11	13	48	56	−8	29	
17	Iberia Biobío	33	9	11	13	36	49	−13	29	
18	Provincial Osorno	33	7	14	12	32	43	−11	28	
19	San Antonio Unido	33	10	8	15	36	54	−18	28	Qualified for relegation playoff
20	Deportes Ovalle	33	10	7	16	31	41	−10	27	Qualified for relegation playoff
21	Curicó Unido	33	6	13	14	38	58	−20	25	Qualified for relegation playoff
22	Ñuble Unido	33	9	6	18	37	51	−14	24	Qualified for relegation playoff
23	Deportes Colchagua	33	7	9	17	44	60	−16	23	Relegated to 1984 Tercera División de Chile
24	Santiago Morning	33	5	9	19	38	66	−28	19	Relegated to 1984 Tercera División de Chile

Source: rsssf.com

== Promotion and relegation playoffs ==
=== Promotion playoffs ===
Pos	Team	Pld	W	D	L	GF	GA	GD	Pts	Promotion
1	Deportes La Serena	3	2	1	0	13	7	+6	5	Asciende a Primera División
2	Coquimbo Unido	3	2	1	0	9	6	+3	5	Asciende a Primera División
3	Deportes Laja	3	1	0	2	11	13	−2	2	
4	Malleco Unido	3	0	0	3	8	15	−7	0	

Source: rsssf.com

=== Relegation playoffs ===
Pos	Team	Pld	W	D	L	GF	GA	GD	Pts	Relegation
1	Curicó Unido	3	3	0	0	8	1	+7	6	
2	Deportes Ovalle	3	2	0	1	7	2	+5	4	
3	Ñuble Unido	3	1	0	2	2	8	−6	2	Desciende a Tercera División
4	San Antonio Unido	3	0	0	3	1	7	−6	0	Desciende a Tercera División

Source: rsssf.com

== See also ==
- Chilean football league system
