= Pontoni =

Pontoni is a surname. Notable people with the surname include:

- Billy Pontoni (born 1954), Colombian musician
- Camilo Pontoni (born 1995), Chilean footballer
- Daniele Pontoni (born 1966), Italian cyclist
- René Pontoni (1920–1983), Argentine footballer and manager
