= Yonathan Suazo =

Chilean footballer (born 1989)

Personal information
- Full name: Yonathan Alfonso Suazo Cuevas
- Date of birth: 17 November 1989 (age 36)
- Place of birth: Talcahuano, Chile
- Height: 1.79 m (5 ft 10 in)
- Position: Right-back

Team information
- Current team: Comunal Cabrero

Senior career*
Years	Team	Apps	(Gls)
2008–2013	Huachipato	32	(0)
2006–2007	→ Deportes Concepción (loan)	15	(0)
2012	→ Everton (loan)	17	(0)
2013–2014	Ñublense	26	(0)
2014–2016	Unión La Calera	54	(0)
2016–2017	Naval	27	(0)
2017–2018	Deportes La Serena	29	(0)
2019	Magallanes	19	(1)
2020	Deportes Puerto Montt	25	(0)
2021	Iberia	20	(1)
2022	Deportes Recoleta	24	(0)
2023–2024	Deportes Linares	33	(1)
2025	Provincial Osorno	20	(0)
2026–	Comunal Cabrero	0	(0)
- * Club domestic league appearances and goals as of 4 March 2026

Yonathan Alfonso Suazo Cuevas (born 17 November 1989) is a Chilean professional footballer who plays as a right-back for Comunal Cabrero.

== Career ==
Suazo signed with Provincial Osorno for the 2025 season. The next year, he switched to Comunal Cabrero.
