= Lucas Triviño =

Argentine-born Chilean footballer

Personal information
- Full name: Lucas Exequiel Triviño Rodríguez
- Date of birth: 24 April 1992 (age 34)
- Place of birth: La Plata, Argentina
- Height: 1.75 m (5 ft 9 in)
- Position: Forward

Youth career
- 1996–2005: Agrupación Gimnasista
- 2005–2008: Estudiantes
- 2009: Villa San Carlos
- 2010: Ñublense

Senior career*
Years	Team	Apps	(Gls)
2010–2017	Ñublense	34	(7)
2012–2013	→ Trasandino (loan)	20	(4)
2013–2014	Ñublense B	12	(4)
2014–2015	→ San Antonio Unido (loan)	26	(10)
2015–2016	→ San Antonio Unido (loan)	24	(8)
2018–2019	Malleco Unido	24	(2)
2020–2021	Cobreloa	2	(0)
2021	Colchagua	1	(0)
Total		143	(35)
- * Club domestic league appearances and goals

Lucas Exequiel Triviño Rodríguez (born 24 April 1992) is a former Argentine–born Chilean professional footballer who played as a forward.

== Honours ==
Trasandino

- Tercera A: 2012
