= 1991 Campeonato Nacional Segunda División =

Segunda División
- Season: 1991
- Champions: Deportes Temuco
- Promoted: Deportes Temuco; Huachipato
- Relegated: Ñublense; Deportes Linares; Cobreandino; Deportes Ovalle; Lozapenco

The 1991 Segunda División de Chile was the 40th season of the Segunda División de Chile.

Deportes Temuco was the tournament's champion.

== Aggregate table ==
=== North Zone ===
Pos	Team	Pld	W	D	L	GF	GA	GD	Pts	Qualification
1	Soinca Bata	18	11	5	2	29	16	+13	27	Qualified for the promotion playoffs
2	Deportes Iquique	18	9	4	5	34	29	+5	22	Qualified for the promotion playoffs
3	Regional Atacama	18	8	5	5	30	22	+8	21	Qualified for the promotion playoffs
4	Magallanes	18	8	5	5	27	24	+3	21	Qualified for the promotion playoffs
5	Unión La Calera	18	7	6	5	27	24	+3	20	Qualified for the promotion playoffs
6	Audax Italiano	18	6	6	6	27	27	0	18	Qualified for the relegation playoffs
7	Deportes Arica	18	5	5	8	23	26	−3	15	Qualified for the relegation playoffs
8	Deportes Ovalle	18	3	8	7	18	25	−7	14	Qualified for the relegation playoffs
9	Cobreandino	18	4	5	9	24	29	−5	13	Qualified for the relegation playoffs
10	Unión San Felipe	18	3	3	12	23	40	−17	9	Qualified for the relegation playoffs

Source: globalsportsarchive.com

=== South Zone ===
Pos	Team	Pld	W	D	L	GF	GA	GD	Pts	Qualification
1	Deportes Temuco	18	10	4	4	28	19	+9	24	Qualified for the promotion playoffs
2	Colchagua	18	10	2	6	27	16	+11	22	Qualified for the promotion playoffs
3	Iberia	18	8	5	5	18	16	+2	21	Qualified for the promotion playoffs
4	Deportes Puerto Montt	18	5	9	4	25	21	+4	19	Qualified for the promotion playoffs
5	Huachipato	18	7	5	6	21	18	+3	19	Qualified for the promotion playoffs
6	Lota Schwager	18	7	4	7	28	27	+1	18	Qualified for the relegation playoffs
7	Ñublense	18	4	9	5	24	21	+3	17	Qualified for the relegation playoffs
8	Rangers	18	7	3	8	22	29	−7	17	Qualified for the relegation playoffs
9	Deportes Linares	18	5	5	8	19	26	−7	15	Qualified for the relegation playoffs
10	Lozapenco	18	2	4	12	15	34	−19	6 (Note: Lozapenco lost two points due to failures related to judicial issues.)	Qualified for the relegation playoffs

Source: globalsportsarchive.com

== Second phase ==
=== Promotion playoffs ===
Pos	Team	Pld	W	D	L	GF	GA	GD	Pts	Promotion or qualification
1	Huachipato	18	11	3	4	30	19	+11	25	Promoted to 1992 Primera División de Chile
2	Deportes Temuco	18	9	5	4	32	18	+14	23	Promoted to 1992 Primera División de Chile
3	Soinca Bata	18	7	8	3	21	15	+6	22	Qualified to 1991 Primera División de Chile playoffs
4	Deportes Puerto Montt	18	8	5	5	39	24	+15	21	Qualified to 1991 Primera División de Chile playoffs
5	Deportes Iquique	18	8	2	8	28	21	+7	18	
6	Deportes Colchagua	18	6	4	8	22	31	−9	16	
7	Regional Atacama	18	6	4	8	17	26	−9	16	
8	Unión La Calera	18	4	5	9	19	27	−8	13	
9	Iberia	18	4	5	9	21	34	−13	13	
10	Magallanes	18	4	5	9	17	31	−14	13	

Source: globalsportsarchive.com

=== Relegation playoffs ===
Pos	Team	Pld	W	D	L	GF	GA	GD	Pts	Relegation
1	Lota Schwager	18	8	6	4	27	24	+3	22	
2	Audax Italiano	18	9	3	6	36	27	+9	21	
3	Unión San Felipe	18	8	4	6	33	23	+10	20	
4	Rangers	18	7	4	7	25	22	+3	18	
5	Deportes Arica	18	6	5	7	27	22	+5	17	
6	Ñublense	18	8	4	6	28	23	+5	17 (Note: 3 points deducted)	Relegated to 1992 Tercera División de Chile
7	Deportes Linares	18	6	5	7	26	27	−1	17	Relegated to 1992 Tercera División de Chile
8	Cobreandino	18	6	5	7	16	27	−11	17	Relegated to 1992 Tercera División de Chile
9	Deportes Ovalle	18	4	7	7	17	26	−9	15	Relegated to 1992 Tercera División de Chile
10	Lozapenco	18	4	5	9	16	30	−14	13	Relegated to 1992 Tercera División de Chile

Source: globalsportsarchive.com

== See also ==
- Chilean football league system
