= 1964 Campeonato Nacional Segunda División =

Segunda División
- Season: 1964
- Country: Chile
- Champions: O'Higgins
- Runner up: Lister Rossel
- Promoted: O'Higgins
- Relegated: None
- Top goalscorer: Mario Desiderio and Dalmacio San Martín (19 goals)

The 1964 Segunda División de Chile was the 13th season of the Segunda División de Chile.

O'Higgins was the tournament's champion.

== Table ==
Pos	Team	Pld	W	D	L	GF	GA	GD	Pts
1	O'Higgins (C, P)	36	22	9	5	62	39	+23	53
2	Lister Rossel	36	18	13	5	70	39	+31	49
3	Deportes Temuco	36	17	10	9	61	46	+15	44
4	San Antonio Unido	36	18	6	12	58	42	+16	42
5	Trasandino	36	16	7	13	54	55	−1	39
6	Ñublense	36	13	10	13	56	56	0	36
7	San Bernardo Central	36	10	13	13	34	40	−6	33
8	Universidad Técnica del Estado	36	13	6	17	54	65	−11	32
9	Luis Cruz Martínez	36	10	11	15	39	45	−6	31
10	Iberia-Puente Alto	36	11	8	17	54	64	−10	30
11	Municipal de Santiago	36	9	11	16	44	54	−10	29
12	Deportes Colchagua	36	8	9	19	43	63	−20	25
13	Ovalle Ferroviarios	36	8	9	19	45	66	−21	25

Source: rsssf.com
(C) Champions; (P) Promoted

Champions
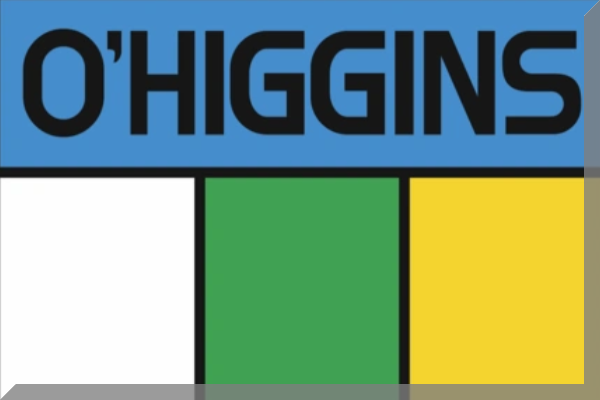
O'Higgins
1st title

=== O'Higgins winning squad ===
O'Higgins
- (Chile) 1964 Segunda División winners
  Raúl Ramos (GK), Manuel Canelo, Federico Vairo, Aldo Droguett, César Valdivia, Carlos Guerra, Douglas Bedwell, Jorge Dagnino, Mario Desiderio, Ricardo Díaz, Luis Morales, Luis Fuentealba (GK), Manuel Abarca, Omar Pozo, Violante Latorre.
  Head coach: José Pérez.

== Goalscorers ==
Player	Team	Goals
(Argentina) Mario Desiderio	O'Higgins	19 goals
(Chile) Dalmacio San Martín	Lister Rossel	19 goals

== See also ==
- Chilean football league system
