= 1977 Campeonato Nacional Segunda División =

Segunda División
- Season: 1977
- Champions: Coquimbo Unido
- Promoted: Coquimbo Unido; Rangers; Cobreloa
- Relegated: None

The 1977 Segunda División de Chile was the 26th season of the Segunda División de Chile.

Coquimbo Unido was the tournament's champion.

== Table ==
Pos	Team	Pld	W	D	L	GF	GA	GD	Pts	Promotion or qualification
1	Coquimbo Unido (C, P)	34	18	11	5	53	30	+23	47	Promoted to 1978 Primera División de Chile
2	Rangers (P)	34	18	8	8	54	37	+17	44	Promoted to 1978 Primera División de Chile
3	Malleco Unido	34	15	13	6	45	30	+15	43	1977 Primera División de Chile promotion/relegation playoffs
4	Cobreloa	34	17	8	9	54	30	+24	42	1977 Primera División de Chile promotion/relegation playoffs
5	Unión San Felipe	34	15	11	8	58	39	+19	41	
6	Deportes La Serena	34	16	8	10	65	51	+14	40	
7	Naval	34	12	12	10	48	41	+7	36	
8	Trasandino	34	13	10	11	51	57	−6	36	
9	Linares Unido	34	13	8	13	54	50	+4	34	
10	Independiente de Cauquenes	34	11	12	11	50	49	+1	34	
11	San Luis de Quillota	34	12	9	13	53	53	0	33	
12	San Antonio Unido	34	10	9	15	56	67	−11	29	
13	Iberia	34	9	10	15	42	61	−19	28	
14	Deportes Colchagua	34	9	9	16	35	48	−13	27	
15	Curicó Unido	34	9	7	18	29	45	−16	25	
16	Unión La Calera	34	8	9	17	43	65	−22	25	
17	Ferroviarios	34	8	8	18	39	55	−16	24	
18	Magallanes	34	8	8	18	44	65	−21	24	

Source: rsssf.com
(C) Champions; (P) Promoted

== See also ==
- Chilean football league system
