= José Acevedo =

José Acevedo may refer to:

- José Acevedo y Gómez (1773–1817), Colombian hero
- José Acevedo Briones (1916–1973), Chilean politician
- José Acevedo (baseball) (born 1977), Dominican Republic baseball pitcher
- José Acevedo (footballer) (born 1985), Chilean footballer
- José Acevedo (sprinter) (born 1986), Venezuelan sprinter
