= Cristian Olivares =

Cristian Olivares may refer to:

- Cristian Olivares (footballer, born 1976), Chilean football attacking midfielder
- Cristian Olivares (footballer, born 1980), Chilean football coach and former defender
