= 2012 Campeonato Nacional Primera B =

Primera B de Chile
- Season: 2012 Primera B
- Champions: San Marcos de Arica

The 2012 Primera B de Chile season was the 62nd completed season of the Primera B de Chile.

== Torneo Apertura ==
San Marcos de Arica was tournament’s champion.

Pos	Team	Pld	W	D	L	GF	GA	GD	Pts
1	San Marcos de Arica	19	10	6	3	39	21	+18	36
2	Ñublense	19	9	7	3	33	26	+7	34
3	Barnechea	19	10	3	6	33	26	+7	33
4	Deportes Concepción	19	8	6	5	29	17	+12	30
5	Everton	19	9	2	8	34	26	+8	29
6	San Luis de Quillota	19	7	5	7	28	31	−3	26
7	Unión Temuco	19	6	7	6	21	24	−3	25
8	Lota Schwager	19	6	6	7	23	26	−3	24
9	Coquimbo Unido	19	6	5	8	26	29	−3	23
10	Deportes Puerto Montt	19	6	4	9	23	32	−9	22
11	Magallanes	19	6	3	10	16	27	−11	21
12	Naval	19	5	6	8	25	25	0	21
13	Curicó Unido	19	5	6	8	21	31	−10	21
14	Santiago Morning	19	4	6	9	24	34	−10	18

Source: rsssf.com

== Torneo Clausura ==
San Marcos de Arica was tournament’s champion.

Pos	Team	Pld	W	D	L	GF	GA	GD	Pts
1	San Marcos de Arica	19	10	5	4	25	21	+4	35
2	Barnechea	19	9	6	4	28	23	+5	33
3	Naval	19	8	6	5	26	23	+3	30
4	Everton	19	7	7	5	29	22	+7	28
5	Coquimbo Unido	19	8	3	8	29	21	+8	27
6	Santiago Morning	19	8	3	8	28	24	+4	27
7	Ñublense	19	7	6	6	33	30	+3	27
8	San Luis de Quillota	19	7	5	7	25	27	−2	26
9	Deportes Concepción	19	7	5	7	23	27	−4	26
10	Unión Temuco	19	6	6	7	18	24	−6	24
11	Magallanes	19	5	9	5	10	12	−2	24
12	Curicó Unido	19	5	5	9	19	21	−2	20
13	Lota Schwager	19	4	5	10	17	26	−9	17
14	Deportes Puerto Montt	19	4	5	10	14	23	−9	17

Source: rsssf.com
