= 2002 Campeonato Nacional Primera B =

Primera B de Chile
- Season: 2002
- Champions: Deportes Puerto Montt
- Promoted: Deportes Puerto Montt; Universidad de Concepción
- Relegated: Deportes Iquique

The 2002 Primera B de Chile (known as Campeonato Nacional BancoEstado de Primera B for sponsorship reasons) was the 52nd completed season of the Primera B de Chile.

Deportes Puerto Montt (tournament’s champion) alongside Universidad de Concepción were promoted to top-tier after finishing in the first and second places respectively from the promotion playoffs, whilst Deportes Iquique lost the category, relegating for first-time since its foundation to the third-tier.

== First stage ==
=== North Zone ===
Pos	Team	Pld	W	D	L	GF	GA	GD	Pts	Qualification
1	Deportes La Serena	14	12	1	1	42	14	+28	37	Second Stage; Group A
2	Unión La Calera	14	7	3	4	24	17	+7	24	Second Stage; Group A
3	Everton	14	7	4	3	25	21	+4	24 (Note: 1 point deducted for fielding an ineligible player)	Second Stage; Group A
4	Deportes Ovalle	14	6	1	7	17	29	−12	19	Second Stage; Group A
5	Deportes Antofagasta	14	5	3	6	21	22	−1	18	Second Stage; Group B
6	Deportes Arica	14	4	2	8	23	32	−9	14	Second Stage; Group B
7	Deportes Iquique	14	3	4	7	22	24	−2	13	Second Stage; Group B
8	Magallanes	14	2	2	10	16	31	−15	8	Second Stage; Group B

=== South Zone ===
Pos	Team	Pld	W	D	L	GF	GA	GD	Pts	Qualification
1	Universidad de Concepción	14	9	2	3	28	14	+14	29	Second Stage; Group A
2	Deportes Melipilla	14	7	1	6	16	15	+1	22	Second Stage; Group A
3	Deportes Talcahuano	14	6	3	5	22	15	+7	21	Second Stage; Group A
4	Deportes Puerto Montt	14	6	3	5	17	15	+2	21	Second Stage; Group A
5	Arturo Fernández Vial	14	5	4	5	21	18	+3	19	Second Stage; Group B
6	Provincial Osorno	14	6	1	7	19	25	−6	19	Second Stage; Group B
7	Lota Schwager	14	4	2	8	14	27	−13	14	Second Stage; Group B
8	O'Higgins	14	5	0	9	16	24	−8	6 (Note: 9 points deducted for fielding youth team in match against Universidad)	Second Stage; Group B

== Second Stage ==
=== Group A ===
Pos	Team	Pld	W	D	L	GF	GA	GD	Pts	Qualification
1	Deportes Talcahuano	14	8	4	2	19	8	+11	28	Promotion playoffs
2	Everton	14	5	6	3	23	21	+2	21	Promotion playoffs
3	Universidad de Concepción	14	5	5	4	23	19	+4	20	Promotion playoffs
4	Unión La Calera	14	6	2	6	24	24	0	20	Promotion playoffs
5	Deportes Puerto Montt	14	6	2	6	18	18	0	20	Promotion playoffs
6	Deportes Melipilla	14	4	5	5	16	17	−1	17	Promotion playoffs
7	Deportes La Serena	14	4	5	5	21	23	−2	17	Relegation playoffs
8	Deportes Ovalle	14	2	3	9	21	35	−14	9	Relegation playoffs

=== Group B ===
Pos	Team	Pld	W	D	L	GF	GA	GD	Pts	Qualification
1	Deportes Antofagasta	14	8	4	2	21	8	+13	28	Promotion playoffs
2	O'Higgins	14	8	3	3	21	15	+6	27	Promotion playoffs
3	Provincial Osorno	14	8	2	4	27	14	+13	26	Relegation playoffs
4	Arturo Fernández Vial	14	6	4	4	19	19	0	22	Relegation playoffs
5	Deportes Iquique	14	4	4	6	23	24	−1	16	Relegation playoffs
6	Lota Schwager	14	5	1	8	21	31	−10	16	Relegation playoffs
7	Magallanes	14	2	4	8	16	26	−10	10	Relegation playoffs
8	Deportes Arica	14	2	4	8	19	30	−11	10	Relegation playoffs

== Final stage ==
=== Promotion playoffs ===
Pos	Team	Pld	W	D	L	GF	GA	GD	Pts	Promotion
1	Deportes Puerto Montt	14	8	3	3	24	17	+7	27	Promoted
2	Universidad de Concepción	14	6	5	3	21	16	+5	23	Promoted
3	Deportes Melipilla	14	5	6	3	20	14	+6	21	
4	Everton	14	5	4	5	19	16	+3	19	
5	O'Higgins	14	5	4	5	20	18	+2	19	
6	Unión La Calera	14	5	3	6	15	28	−13	18	
7	Deportes Antofagasta	14	4	4	6	17	19	−2	13 (Note: 3 points deducted for not paying players on time.)	
8	Magallanes	14	3	3	8	17	25	−8	12	

=== Relegation Playoffs ===
Pos	Team	Pld	W	D	L	GF	GA	GD	Pts	Relegation
1	Magallanes	14	7	3	4	23	22	+1	24	
2	Arturo Fernández Vial	14	6	6	2	22	19	+3	21 (Note: 3 points deducted for not paying players on time)	
3	Deportes La Serena	14	6	2	6	29	24	+5	20	
4	Provincial Osorno	14	6	2	6	20	21	−1	20	
5	Lota Schwager	14	5	3	6	24	21	+3	18	
6	Deportes Arica	14	5	3	6	20	24	−4	18	
7	Deportes Ovalle	14	4	5	5	16	16	0	17	
8	Deportes Iquique	14	3	4	7	23	30	−7	13	Relegated to Tercera División

== See also ==
- Chilean football league system
