= Andrés Reyes =

Andrés Reyes may refer to:

- Andres Reyes Jr. (born 1950), Filipino judge
- Andrés Reyes (Chilean footballer) (born 1987), Chilean footballer
- Andrés Reyes (footballer, born 1999), Colombian footballer

== See also ==
- Universo 2000 (1963–2018), Mexican wrestler born Andrés Reyes González
- Andrés Reyes (Metropolitano), a bus station in Lima, Peru
