= 1992 Campeonato Nacional Segunda División =

Segunda División
- Season: 1992
- Champions: Provincial Osorno
- Promoted: Provincial Osorno; Deportes Iquique; Deportes Melipilla; Regional Atacama
- Relegated: Iberia

The 1992 Segunda División de Chile was the 41st season of the Segunda División de Chile.

Provincial Osorno was the tournament's champion.

== Aggregate table ==
| Pos | Team | Pld | W | D | L | GF | GA | GD | Pts | Qualification or relegation |
|---|---|---|---|---|---|---|---|---|---|---|
| 1 | Provincial Osorno | 30 | 22 | 4 | 4 | 72 | 36 | +36 | 48 | Promoted to 1993 Primera División de Chile |
| 2 | Deportes Iquique | 30 | 16 | 6 | 8 | 70 | 44 | +26 | 38 | Promoted |
| 3 | Deportes Melipilla | 30 | 14 | 9 | 7 | 37 | 28 | +9 | 37 | Qualified to promotion playoffs |
| 4 | Regional Atacama | 30 | 14 | 5 | 11 | 36 | 29 | +7 | 33 | Qualified to promotion playoffs |
| 5 | Deportes Puerto Montt | 30 | 10 | 10 | 10 | 52 | 29 | +23 | 30 | |
| 6 | Audax Italiano | 30 | 11 | 8 | 11 | 36 | 38 | −2 | 30 | |
| 7 | Unión La Calera | 30 | 11 | 7 | 12 | 44 | 52 | −8 | 29 | |
| 8 | Magallanes | 30 | 10 | 9 | 11 | 40 | 50 | −10 | 29 | |
| 9 | Unión Santa Cruz | 30 | 10 | 8 | 12 | 46 | 46 | 0 | 28 | |
| 10 | Deportes Colchagua | 30 | 10 | 8 | 12 | 44 | 45 | −1 | 28 | |
| 11 | Santiago Wanderers | 30 | 10 | 8 | 12 | 39 | 52 | −13 | 28 | |
| 12 | Deportes Arica | 30 | 10 | 6 | 14 | 43 | 45 | −2 | 26 | |
| 13 | Rangers | 30 | 7 | 11 | 12 | 43 | 46 | −3 | 25 | |
| 14 | Unión San Felipe | 30 | 10 | 4 | 16 | 45 | 60 | −15 | 24 | |
| 15 | Lota Schwager | 30 | 7 | 10 | 13 | 34 | 50 | −16 | 24 | |
| 16 | Iberia | 30 | 7 | 9 | 14 | 34 | 55 | −21 | 23 | Relegated to 1993 Tercera División de Chile |

Source: rsssf.com

== See also ==
- Chilean football league system
