= Estadio Municipal de Los Ángeles =

Stadium in Los Ángeles, Chile

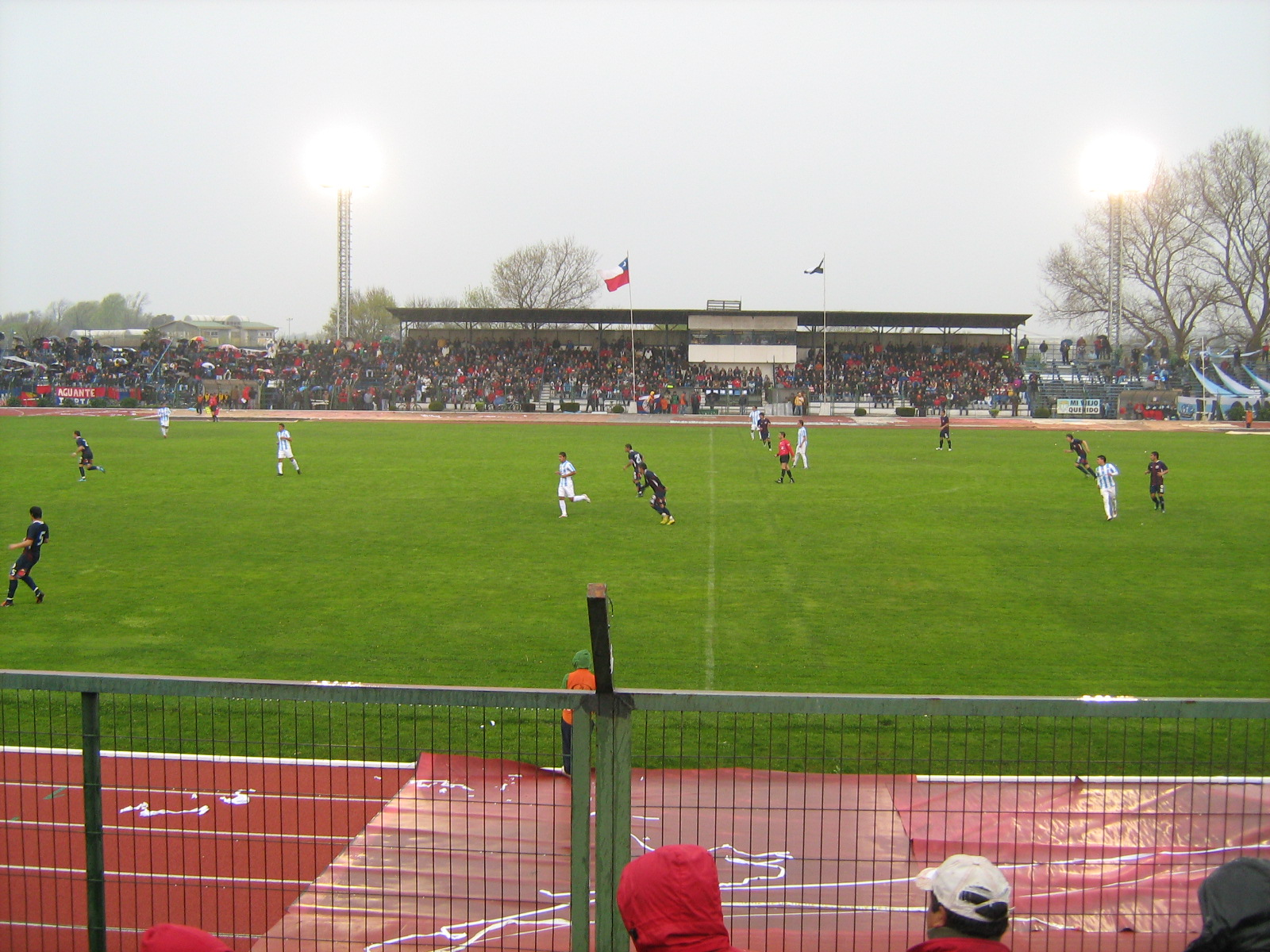
- Iberia versus Magallanes, 2010
- Interactive map of Estadio Municipal de Los Ángeles
- Location: Los Ángeles, Chile
- Coordinates: 33°35′12″S 70°38′9″W
- Owner: Municipality of Los Ángeles
- Capacity: 4,150
- Surface: grass
- Field size: 98 x 62 m

Tenant
- Deportes Iberia

Estadio Municipal de Los Ángeles is a multi-use stadium in Los Ángeles, Chile. It is used mostly for football matches and is the home stadium of Deportes Iberia. The stadium holds 4,150 people.
