= José Santos Arias =

Chilean footballer and manager

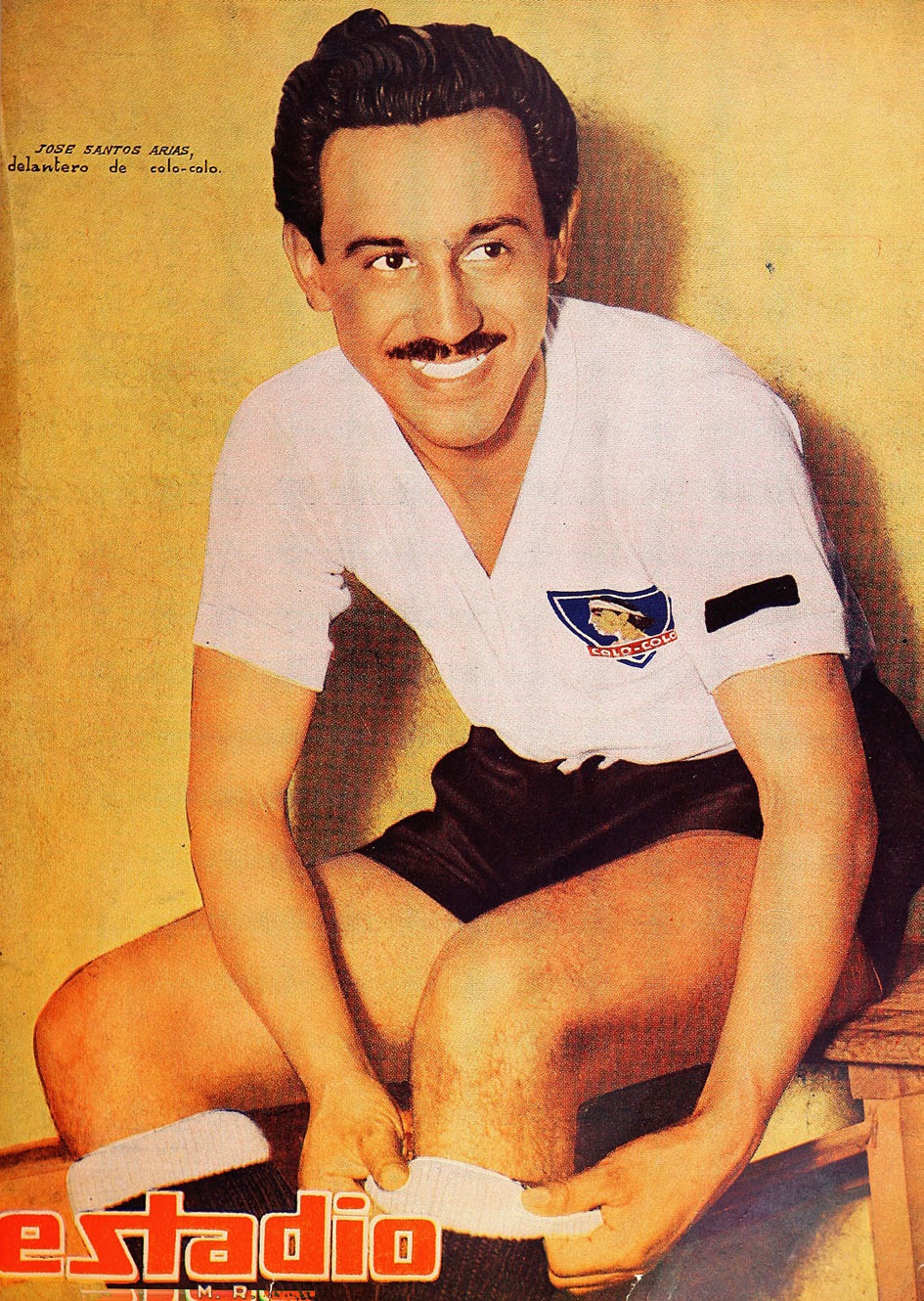

Personal information
- Full name: José Santos Arias González
- Date of birth: 22 January 1928
- Place of birth: Nacimiento, Chile
- Date of death: 4 September 2012 (aged 84)
- Place of death: Santiago, Chile
- Position: Forward

Youth career
- Escuela Normal Victoria

Senior career*
Years	Team	Apps	(Gls)
1950–1952	Colo-Colo	53	(9)
1953–1954	Universidad de Chile	27	(4)
1955	Green Cross		

Managerial career
- Green Cross (youth)
- 1962: San Bernardo Central
- 1965: UTE
- 1967: Chile U20
- 1968: Rangers
- 1970: Colo-Colo (youth)
- 1971: Audax Italiano
- 1973: Chile (amateur)
- 1973–1974: Chile U20
- 1974: Colo-Colo (interim)
- 1974–1975: Colo-Colo (youth)
- 1978–1979: Santiago Morning
- 1984–1985: Soinca Bata
- 1986: Filanbanco (youth)
- 1990–1991: Deportes La Serena
- * Club domestic league appearances and goals

José Santos Arias González (22 January 1928 – 4 September 2012), known as José Santos Arias, was a Chilean football player who played as a forward and manager.

== Career ==
Arias joined Colo-Colo after taking part in a championship in the Estadio Nacional as a member of the team of normal school from Victoria city. As a player of Colo-Colo, he made fifty-three appearances and scored nine goals in the Chilean top division from 1950 to 1952.

In 1953, he switched to the traditional rival, Universidad de Chile, becoming the fifth player to make it directly after Alfonso Domínguez, Pedro Hugo López, Jorge Peñaloza and Javier Mascaró. For them, he made twenty-seven appearances and scored four goals at league level.

His last club was Green Cross in 1955.

== Coaching career ==
Considered a Fernando Riera's disciple, at youth level he worked for clubs such as Green Cross, with whom he began his career, Colo-Colo, Filanbanco, Deportes La Serena, among others. He also coached the Chile under-20 team at both the 1967 and the 1974 South American Championships.

At senior level, he coached clubs such as San Bernardo Central and Universidad Técnica in the second level. In the top division, he led Rangers (1968), Audax Italiano (1971), Colo-Colo as interim (1974), Santiago Morning (1978–79) and Deportes La Serena (1990–91). He also won the Cuarta División in 1984 and got the promotion to the Tercera División with Soinca Bata.

In 1973, he coached the Chile national amateur team with views to the 1975 Pan American Games, previous to the Chilean coup d'état.

As a football teacher, he was one of the founders of the Football Managers Association of Chile and gave classes alongside colleagues such as Pedro Morales and Eddio Inostroza.

== Personal life ==
He graduated as a teacher at the normal school of Victoria, where he coincided with Constantino Mohor and Caupolicán Peña, who were footballers and managers later.

== Honours ==
Soinca Bata

- Cuarta División: 1984
