= 1996 Campeonato Nacional Primera B =

Primera B de Chile
- Season: 1996
- Champions: Deportes La Serena
- Promoted: Deportes La Serena; Deportes Puerto Montt
- Relegated: Deportes Colchagua

The 1996 Primera B de Chile was the 45th completed season of the Primera B de Chile.

Deportes La Serena (tournament's champion) alongside Deportes Puerto Montt were promoted to 1997 Primera División de Chile season after finishing in the first and second places respectively.

== League table ==
Pos	Team	Pld	W	D	L	GF	GA	GD	Pts
1	Deportes La Serena	30	19	5	6	55	36	+19	62
2	Deportes Puerto Montt	30	16	7	7	50	43	+7	55
3	Cobresal	30	16	7	7	76	43	+33	52 (Note: Deducted 3 points for bad registration of Jorge Abarca.)
4	Deportes Iquique	30	14	7	9	49	39	+10	49
5	Rangers	30	13	7	10	61	45	+16	46
6	Fernández Vial	30	13	5	12	50	50	0	44
7	Everton	30	12	7	11	55	34	+21	43
8	Deportes Melipilla	30	11	8	11	38	43	−5	41
9	Ñublense	30	12	5	13	40	47	−7	41
10	Magallanes	30	11	7	12	50	58	−8	40
11	Unión Santa Cruz	30	10	6	14	29	49	−20	36
12	Deportes Linares	30	8	10	12	42	55	−13	34
13	Unión San Felipe	30	8	7	15	37	56	−19	31
14	Deportes Arica	30	7	9	14	43	57	−14	30
15	Deportes Ovalle	30	6	11	13	35	47	−12	29
16	Colchagua	30	7	6	17	40	49	−9	27

Source: rsssf.com

== Promotion/relegation play-offs ==
1 December 1996	Cobresal	3 – 1	Deportes Temuco	Estadio El Cobre
	Rivera 57'; Salgado 20'; Garrido 73'		Alvarez 79'	Attendance: 4,110; Referee: Salvador Imperatore

1 December 1996	Deportes Iquique	1 – 0	Palestino	Estadio Tierra de Campeones
	Donoso 17'			Attendance: 7,152; Referee: Enrique Marín

8 December 1996	Deportes Temuco	2 – 0	Cobresal	Estadio Germán Becker
	Castillo 27'; Poirrier 30'			Attendance: 13,089; Referee: Mariano Peña

8 December 1996	Palestino	5 – 1	Deportes Iquique	Estadio Municipal de La Cisterna
	Castillo 8', 14'; Lizana 52'; Córdova 73', 90'		Donoso 88'	Attendance: 4,500; Referee: Iván Guerrero

== Top scorers ==
Player		Goals	Team
(Chile)	Sergio Salgado	27	Cobresal
(Argentina)	Ruben Dundo	18	Arturo Fernández Vial
(Uruguay)	Richard Álvarez	15	Deportes Iquique
(Chile)	Mario Araya	13	Deportes La Serena
(Uruguay)	Alejandro Chilindrón	13	Rangers
(Chile)	Francisco Pinto	13	Deportes La Serena
(Chile)	Luis Zambrano	13	Ñublense
(Argentina)	Alberto Arzubialde	12	Deportes Arica
(Chile)	Juan Luis Cerón	12	Colchagua
(Chile)	Pascual de Gregorio	12	Rangers
(Chile)	Manuel Neira	12	Everton
(Chile)	Fernando Martel	12	Unión San Felipe
(Argentina)	Walter Otta	12	Deportes Puerto Montt
(Chile)	Eugenio Poblete	12	Arturo Fernández Vial
