= 1995 Campeonato Nacional Segunda División =

Segunda División
- Season: 1995
- Champions: Santiago Wanderers
- Promoted: Santiago Wanderers; Audax Italiano
- Relegated: Unión La Calera
- Top goalscorer: Sergio Salgado (Cobresal; 24 goals)

The 1995 Segunda División de Chile was the 44th season of the Segunda División de Chile.

Santiago Wanderers was the tournament's champion.

== Aggregate table ==
Pos	Team	Pld	W	D	L	GF	GA	GD	Pts	Promotion or relegation
1	Santiago Wanderers	30	14	10	6	43	27	+16	52	Promoted to 1996 Primera División de Chile
2	Audax Italiano	30	15	7	8	54	35	+19	52	Promoted
3	Cobresal	30	14	9	7	50	36	+14	51	Qualified to promotion playoffs
4	Unión San Felipe	30	13	11	6	60	41	+19	50	Qualified to promotion playoffs
5	Rangers	30	13	11	6	52	39	+13	50	
6	Colchagua	30	13	8	9	32	25	+7	47	
7	Fernández Vial	30	12	9	9	37	38	−1	45	
8	Ñublense	30	12	8	10	44	38	+6	44	
9	Unión Santa Cruz	30	12	5	13	43	53	−10	41	
10	Deportes Ovalle	20	11	7	2	36	32	+4	40	
11	Deportes Puerto Montt	30	9	11	10	43	39	+4	38	
12	Deportes Iquique	30	9	11	10	34	43	−9	38	
13	Deportes Linares	30	6	10	14	31	55	−24	28	
14	Deportes Melipilla	30	6	9	15	34	55	−21	27	
15	Deportes Arica	30	6	8	16	25	47	−22	26	
16	Unión La Calera	30	5	7	18	31	47	−16	22	Relegated to 1996 Tercera División de Chile

Source: rsssf.com

== Promotion/relegation play-offs ==
9 December 1995	Cobresal	1 – 0	Huachipato	Estadio El Cobre, El Salvador
	J. Neira 74' (pen.)			Attendance: 4,629; Referee: J. Toro

9 December 1995	Unión San Felipe	2 – 2	Regional Atacama	Estadio Municipal, San Felipe
	Martel 33'; Alonso 73'		73', 73' Malbrán	Attendance: 4,978; Referee: L. Osorio

16 December 1995	Huachipato	3 – 1	Cobresal	Estadio Las Higueras, Talcahuano
	Castillo 6'; Torres 9' (pen.); Fuentes 40'		3' Troncoso	Attendance: 8,109; Referee: I. Guerrero

16 December 1995	Regional Atacama	1 – 1	Unión San Felipe	Estadio Luis Valenzuela Hermosilla, Copiapo
	Correa 30'		6' Castro	Attendance: 4,537; Referee: S. Imperatore

Regional Atacama and Huachipato stayed in the Primera División Chilena

== See also ==
- Chilean football league system
