= Matías Gutiérrez (Chilean footballer) =

Chilean footballer (born 1994)

Personal information
- Full name: Matías Ignacio Gutiérrez Breve
- Date of birth: 3 May 1994 (age 32)
- Place of birth: Temuco, Chile
- Height: 1.83 m (6 ft 0 in)
- Position: Centre back

Youth career
- 2008–2010: Colo-Colo

Senior career*
Years	Team	Apps	(Gls)
2011–2015	Colo-Colo B	43	(2)
2012	Colo-Colo	1	(0)
2015–2016	Coquimbo Unido	8	(0)
2016–2018	Malleco Unido	55	(2)
2019	Colchagua	15	(0)

International career^{‡}
2011	Chile	1	(0)
- * Club domestic league appearances and goals as of 7 October 2019 ‡ National team caps and goals as of 4 April 2012

Matías Ignacio Gutiérrez Breve (born 3 May 1994) is a Chilean footballer who last played for Colchagua as a centre back.

== Club career ==
Gutiérrez has played club football for Colo-Colo.

== International career ==
He made his international debut for Chile on 22 December 2011, in the 83rd minute in a 3–2 win v Paraguay.
