= 1957 Campeonato Nacional Segunda División =

Chilean football league season

Segunda División
- Season: 1957
- Champions: Deportes La Serena
- Promoted: Deportes La Serena
- Relegated: Lister Rossel

The 1957 Segunda División de Chile was the sixth season of the Segunda División de Chile.

Deportes La Serena was the tournament's winner.

== Table ==
Pos	Team	Pld	W	D	L	GF	GA	GD	Pts	Qualification or relegation
1	Santiago Morning	27	14	8	5	53	27	+26	36	Qualified for final
2	La Serena (C, P)	27	15	6	6	57	31	+26	36	Qualified for final
3	Unión La Calera	27	10	11	6	51	36	+15	31	
4	Alianza	27	9	10	8	37	34	+3	28	
5	San Bernardo Central	27	8	11	8	34	43	−9	27	
6	Trasandino	27	9	7	11	42	49	−7	25	
7	San Fernando	27	7	10	10	36	41	−5	24	
8	Iberia	27	8	6	13	36	49	−13	22	
9	Universidad Técnica del Estado	27	6	9	12	33	57	−24	21	
10	Lister Rossel (R)	27	6	8	13	33	45	−12	20	Relegated

(C) Champions; (P) Promoted; (R) Relegated

== Final ==
22 December 1957

La Serena	1–0	Santiago Morning
Verdejo 51'

Estadio Municipal de Quillota
Attendance: 8,427

== See also ==
- Chilean football league system
