= 1956 Campeonato Nacional Primera División =

Campeonato Nacional de Fútbol Profesional
- Dates: 5 May 1956 – 18 November 1956
- Champions: Colo-Colo (7th title)
- Relegated: Santiago Morning
- Matches: 182
- Goals: 586 (3.22 per match)
- Top goalscorer: Guillermo Villarroel (19 goals)
- Biggest home win: Universidad de Chile 5–1 Unión Española (29 June)
- Highest attendance: 40,277 Universidad de Chile 1–4 Colo-Colo (3 June)
- Total attendance: 1,474,158
- Average attendance: 8,099

The 1956 Campeonato Nacional de Fútbol Profesional, was the 24th season of top-flight football in Chile. Colo-Colo won their seventh title.

== Scores ==
	AUD	COL	EVE	FEB	GCR	MAG	OHI	PAL	RAN	SLU	SMO	UES	UCH	SWA
Audax		2–1	0–1	4–1	1–1	1–1	0–0	4–5	1–0	2–2	2–1	0–2	2–0	3–0
Colo-Colo	2–2		0–0	1–0	3–1	3–2	3–0	3–1	1–2	1–0	3–2	3–1	4–2	1–1
Everton	4–1	2–2		2–2	3–1	2–3	2–2	3–2	2–3	0–0	4–3	1–1	3–1	2–2
Ferrobádminton	1–2	0–3	1–3		1–1	1–3	3–2	2–3	2–2	2–1	1–1	3–2	0–3	2–2
Green Cross	3–1	0–4	3–0	2–1		1–1	0–0	1–1	2–2	4–1	2–2	2–2	1–3	1–1
Magallanes	2–2	3–2	1–1	4–0	1–0		2–4	1–1	1–1	0–3	2–2	1–1	2–0	1–1
O'Higgins	3–0	1–3	1–0	2–1	2–0	3–3		1–1	2–2	0–1	2–3	3–2	2–2	1–0
Palestino	2–5	3–4	3–3	0–1	1–1	1–3	4–2		3–1	3–1	1–0	3–2	4–2	0–2
Rangers	2–0	1–2	2–2	0–0	1–3	2–0	1–1	1–0		2–0	2–1	1–1	2–1	2–1
San Luis	1–1	0–1	5–2	1–1	3–0	0–1	0–1	3–2	0–0		0–2	0–1	1–1	0–1
S. Morning	2–0	2–4	2–5	2–4	1–0	0–3	1–1	1–2	0–4	2–0		0–3	0–2	1–1
U. Española	0–3	2–0	0–0	1–1	2–0	3–2	5–2	2–1	2–1	2–3	4–2		2–0	2–4
U. de Chile	1–1	1–4	3–1	1–1	0–3	1–1	2–1	2–1	1–2	3–2	0–1	5–1		1–2
S. Wanderers	3–0	3–2	3–1	3–1	1–1	3–0	2–2	1–4	2–0	0–0	4–2	0–2	1–0	

== Standings ==
Pos	Team	Pld	W	D	L	GF	GA	GD	Pts	Qualification or relegation
1	Colo-Colo	26	17	4	5	60	34	+26	38	Champions
2	Santiago Wanderers	26	12	9	5	44	32	+12	33	
3	Rangers	26	11	9	6	39	31	+8	31	
4	Unión Española	26	12	6	8	48	41	+7	30	
5	Magallanes	26	9	11	6	44	39	+5	29	
6	Everton	26	8	11	7	49	47	+2	27	
7	Audax Italiano	26	9	8	9	40	41	−1	26	
8	O'Higgins	26	8	10	8	41	43	−2	26	
9	Palestino	26	10	5	11	52	52	0	25	
10	Green Cross	26	6	11	9	34	39	−5	23	
11	Universidad de Chile	26	8	5	13	38	45	−7	21	
12	San Luis	26	6	7	13	28	35	−7	19	
13	Ferrobádminton	26	5	9	12	33	51	−18	19	
14	Santiago Morning	26	6	5	15	36	56	−20	17	Relegated to Segunda División

Campeonato de Fútbol Profesional
1956 champions
Colo-Colo
7th title

== Topscorer ==
Name	Team	Goals
(Chile) Guillermo Villarroel	O'Higgins	19
