= 1993 Campeonato Nacional Segunda División =

Segunda División
- Season: 1993
- Champions: Rangers
- Promoted: Rangers; Cobresal; Regional Atacama
- Relegated: Iberia

The 1993 Segunda División de Chile was the 42nd season of the Segunda División de Chile.

Rangers was the tournament's champion.

== Aggregate table ==
Pos	Team	Pld	W	D	L	GF	GA	GD	Pts	Qualification or relegation
1	Rangers	30	19	4	7	50	18	+32	42	Promoted to 1994 Primera División de Chile
2	Cobresal	30	15	10	5	40	20	+20	40	Promoted
3	Regional Atacama	30	14	10	6	45	24	+21	38	Qualified to promotion playoffs
4	Deportes Arica	30	15	7	8	43	38	+5	37	Qualified to promotion playoffs
5	Huachipato	30	14	8	8	40	31	+9	36	
6	Audax Italiano	30	12	9	9	40	33	+7	33	
7	Santiago Wanderers	30	11	9	10	42	36	+6	31	
8	Unión Santa Cruz	30	12	5	13	43	37	+6	29	
9	Unión San Felipe	30	11	6	13	39	47	−8	28	
10	Deportes Colchagua	30	6	15	9	23	30	−7	27	
11	Ñublense	30	9	9	12	28	39	−11	27	
12	Lota Schwager	30	8	10	12	31	36	−5	26	
13	Fernández Vial	30	10	6	14	41	52	−11	26	
14	Deportes Puerto Montt	30	9	3	18	40	56	−16	21	
15	Unión La Calera	30	6	8	16	29	51	−22	20	
16	Magallanes	30	6	7	17	38	65	−27	15 (Note: 4 points deducted?)	Relegated to 1994 Tercera División de Chile

Source: rsssf.com

== See also ==
- Chilean football league system
