= Román Soto =

Chilean football manager

Personal information
- Full name: Román Soto Vergara
- Date of birth: 1923
- Place of birth: Chile
- Date of death: 22 July 2016 (aged 93)
- Place of death: Montes de Oca, Costa Rica

Managerial career
- Years: Team
- 1951: Antofagasta (city team)
- 1951–1952: Temuco (city team)
- 1952: Fanaloza
- 1954: Magallanes (assistant)
- 1961: LDU Quito
- 1966: Atlético Bucaramanga
- 1967: Puntarenas
- 1968: Herediano
- Uruguay de Coronado
- Orión
- 1971: Rohrmoser

Román Soto Vergara (1923 – 22 July 2016) was a Chilean football manager. He has been one of the four Chilean managers who have worked in Costa Rica along with Hugo Tassara, Constantino Mohor and Javier Mascaró.

== Career ==
In his country of birth, Soto coached the city teams of both Antofagasta and Temuco as well as club Fanaloza from Penco. He also was the assistant of Isaac Mlynarz in Magallanes.

He moved abroad and led Ecuadorian club LDU Quito in the 1961 Campeonato Ecuatoriano de Fútbol. In addition, he won the Campeonato Profesional Interandino. As a curiosity, he made a recommendation letter to the State Technical University for the former youth player Max Berrú, who later was one of the founders of the well-known band Inti Illimani.

In 1966, he coached Atlético Bucaramanga in the Campeonato Profesional of Colombia.

Since 1967, he settled in Costa Rica and coached Puntarenas in 1967, Herediano in 1968, Uruguay de Coronado, Orión and Rohrmoser in 1971.

== Other works ==
In addition to work as a football coach, he also was a football instructor at the INCUDE in the 1970s and a member of the FIFA football managers.

Always in Costa Rica, he worked as a football commentator in radio media.

== Personal life ==
Soto made his home in Costa Rica and died on 22 July 2016 at the age of 93.

== Honours ==
LDU Quito

- Campeonato Profesional Interandino: 1961
