= Eloy Vidal =

Chilean footballer (1951–2004)

Personal information
- Full name: Eloy Enrique Vidal Coloma
- Date of birth: 26 September 1951
- Place of birth: Valparaíso, Chile
- Date of death: 6 April 2004 (aged 52)
- Place of death: Arica, Chile
- Position: Defensive midfielder

Youth career
- Carlos Vial

Senior career*
Years	Team	Apps	(Gls)
- Rangers
1974–1975	Aviación	33	(5)
1976	Naval	17	(0)
1977	Rangers		
1978–1981	Royale Union		
- Orange FC
- RRC Etterbeck
- VEM Tombeek

Managerial career
- 2000: Quintero Unido
- * Club domestic league appearances and goals

Eloy Enrique Vidal Coloma (26 September 1951 – 6 April 2004), known as Paco Vidal in Belgium, was a Chilean professional footballer. He played as a defensive midfielder for clubs in Chile, Belgium and France.

== Career ==
A defensive midfielder, as a youth player, Vidal was with club Carlos Vial of the Asociación Osmán Pérez Freire from his city of birth, Valparaíso, moving after to Rangers de Talca.

In his homeland, he also played for Aviación (1974–75), and Naval (1976) in the top division.

With Rangers in the second division, they got promotion to the 1978 Primera División de Chile, after being the runner-up in the 1977 Segunda División de Chile.

In 1978 he emigrated to Europe and joined Royale Union in the Belgian second level for fourteen thousand dollars. In that club, he stood out playing alongside the Luxembourgian Paul Philipp.

His last clubs were Orange FC in France and both RRC Etterbeck and VEM Tombeek in Belgium.

== Post-retirement ==
He graduated as a football manager in Belgium, returned to Chile at the end of the 1990s and had a stint as coach of Quintero Unido in the Chilean fourth level in the 2000 season.

In his last years, he coached amateur teams in Arica such as Esmeralda, Emelnor and the team of former footballers of Santiago Wanderers who lived in that city. At the same time, he performed as player for clubs such as Adsubliata and Asoagro.

== Personal life ==
In Belgium, he was known as Paco Vidal.

In Valparaíso, before emigrating to Belgium, he was in a love relationship with Patricia Lazo Pinochet, with whom he had two children, Carolina and Christopher.

In Belgium, he married a Belgian citizen. After separating from her, he fell into a depression and alcoholism, became a homeless person in Arica, having previously lived along with his aunt Egea Vidal, and suffered cirrhosis.

He died in Arica due to a bronchopneumonia. His body was found inside a car where he used to stay overnight and preserved photos of his Belgian wife and letters for her.
