= 1967 Campeonato Nacional Segunda División =

Segunda División
- Season: 1967
- Champions: Deportes Concepción
- Promoted: Deportes Concepción
- Relegated: None

The 1967 Segunda División de Chile was the 16th season of the Segunda División de Chile.

Deportes Concepción was the tournament's champion.

== Table ==
Pos	Team	Pld	W	D	L	GF	GA	GD	Pts
1	Deportes Concepción (C, P)	26	18	6	2	50	21	+29	42
2	Lota Schwager	26	17	6	3	55	36	+19	40
3	Ñublense	26	12	7	7	57	34	+23	31
4	San Antonio Unido	26	11	7	8	41	38	+3	29
5	Antofagasta Portuario	26	8	12	6	30	30	0	28
6	Universidad Técnica	26	10	6	10	43	37	+6	26
7	Municipal de Santiago	26	9	6	11	42	38	+4	24
8	Deportes Colchagua	26	8	6	12	39	45	−6	22
9	Lister Rossel	26	7	7	12	27	31	−4	21
10	Coquimbo Unido	26	7	7	12	25	38	−13	21
11	Trasandino	26	6	8	12	33	41	−8	20
12	Ferrobádminton	26	6	8	12	34	47	−13	20
13	Iberia-Puente Alto	26	7	6	13	30	52	−22	20
14	Deportes Ovalle (R)	26	7	6	13	24	42	−18	20

Source: rsssf.com
(C) Champions; (P) Promoted; (R) Relegated

== See also ==
- Chilean football league system
