= Hervé Delesie =

Belgian footballer

Personal information
- Date of birth: 9 January 1951 (age 75)

International career
Years	Team	Apps	(Gls)
1976	Belgium	1	(0)

Hervé Delesie (born 9 January 1951) is a Belgian footballer. He played in one match for the Belgium national football team in 1976.
