= Cristián Limenza =

Paraguayan–born Chilean footballer (born 1976)

Personal information
- Full name: Cristián Limenza Estigarribia
- Date of birth: 17 November 1976 (age 49)
- Place of birth: Asunción, Paraguay
- Height: 1.76 m (5 ft 9 1/2 in)
- Position: Goalkeeper

Senior career*
Years	Team	Apps	(Gls)
2003–2004	Presidente Hayes	21	(0)
2005–2006	Lota Schwager	78	(0)
2007–2009	Unión Española	91	(0)
2010–2012	Deportes Iquique	39	(0)
2013–2014	Santiago Morning	40	(0)
2014–2016	Deportes Concepción	62	(0)
2016–2018	Deportes Puerto Montt	13	(0)
Total		344	(0)

Managerial career
- 2024–2025: Atlético Oriente (gk coach)
- 2026–: Santiago Morning (gk coach)
- * Club domestic league appearances and goals

Cristián Limenza Estigarribia (born 17 November 1976) is a former Paraguayan naturalized Chilean football goalkeeper.

== Club career ==
Born in Asunción, Paraguay, Limenza aged 20 joined third-tier team Presidente Hayes in 2003, where he played two seasons.

In 2005, he moved to Chile's Primera B (second level) side Lota Schwager thanks the management of his friend Félix González, who invite him to play with the club. One year later he was a key player in the club's promotion to Primera División, after saving two shoots in the penalties against Rangers at the promotion playoffs final.

In January 2007 he signed for Primera División club Unión Española. He remained at Unión until 2009, and the incoming season he moved to Deportes Iquique where helped the team to win the Primera B and Copa Chile Bicentenario titles.

After being released from Iquique in 2012, he joined Santiago Morning the next year, playing with the club the transition season and the 2013–14 season.

In June 2014 he joined Deportes Concepción.

In mid-2016, after the controversial elimination of Concepción from the professional football by the ANFP, he joined Deportes Puerto Montt.

His last club was —then Primera B de Chile side Deportes Puerto Montt (2016–2018).

== Coaching career ==
Limenza has worked for football academies in Lo Barnechea commune and served as goalkeeping coach for Atlético Oriente since 2024. In March 2026, he joined the technical staff of Esteban Paredes in Santiago Morning.

== Honours ==
Deportes Iquique

- Primera B: 2010
- Copa Chile: 2010
