= Andrés Reyes (Chilean footballer) =

Chilean footballer (born 1987)

Personal information
- Full name: Andrés Esteban Reyes Santibáñez
- Date of birth: 25 September 1987 (age 39)
- Place of birth: Santiago, Chile
- Position: Defender

Senior career*
Years	Team	Apps	(Gls)
2006–2012	Magallanes	59	(1)
2013–2015	Ñublense	53	(1)
2014	Ñublense B	4	(1)
2015–2016	Rangers	10	(0)
2016–2020	Magallanes	83	(5)
2021	Iberia	5	(0)
2023	Gol y Gol	–	(–)
Total		214	(8)
- * Club domestic league appearances and goals

Andrés Esteban Reyes Santibáñez (born 26 September 1987) is a Chilean former footballer who played as a defender.

== Career ==
He retired at the end of the 2021 season and his last club Iberia in the Segunda División Profesional de Chile. However, he and the also former professional footballer, Braulio Leal, joined amateur club Gol y Gol from Vivanco, Río Bueno, for the 2023 South Zone Inter Regional Championship.

== Honours ==
Magallanes

- Tercera A de Chile (1): 2010
