= Camilo Pontoni =

Chilean footballer (born 1995)

Personal information
- Full name: Camilo Ismael Pontoni Hueche
- Date of birth: 29 January 1995 (age 31)
- Place of birth: Temuco, Chile
- Height: 1.73 m (5 ft 8 in)
- Position: Midfielder

Youth career
- 2000–2013: Huachipato

Senior career*
Years	Team	Apps	(Gls)
2013–2018	Huachipato	39	(0)
2018	→ San Marcos (loan)	16	(1)
2019	Magallanes	7	(1)
2020–2021	Iberia	37	(1)
2022	San Antonio Unido	21	(0)
2023	Deportes Linares	10	(1)
- * Club domestic league appearances and goals as of 3 February 2024

Camilo Ismael Pontoni Hueche (born 29 January 1995) is a Chilean professional footballer who plays as a midfielder.
