= Malleco Unido =

Chilean football club

- Full name: Club de Deportes Malleco Unido
- Nickname: "Leones de Nahuelbuta"
- Founded: March 25, 1974; 52 years ago
- Ground: Municipal Alberto Larraguibel Morales; Angol, Chile
- Capacity: 2.345
- Chairman: Claudio Ortega Letelier
- Manager: Miguel Angel Gámez
- League: Segunda División
- 2015–16: 5th
Home colours	Away colours

Club de Deportes Malleco Unido is a Chilean football club from Angol, Chile. The club was founded on March 25, 1974 and currently play in the Chilean Segunda División, the third tier of the Chilean football league system.

The club has 1 official title, the Copa CCU of Closing Tournament 1985-86 of the Segunda División of Chile. In 2009, he returned to the amateurism after 35 years. However, in 2012, was accepted by the ANFA to participate in the Tercera B, a competition in which was runner up and amounted to Tercera División. In 2013 and after several efforts, is accepted by the ANFP to play in the Segunda División of Chile.

His rival traditional is Deportes Iberia.

== Titles ==
- Closing Tournament-Copa CCU: 1

1985–86

== Seasons ==
- 15 seasons in Primera B
- 4 seasons in Segunda División
- 19 seasons in Tercera División
- 1 season in Tercera B
- 3 seasons in Asociación de origen

== Current squad ==
Note: Flags indicate national team as defined under FIFA eligibility rules; some limited exceptions apply. Players may hold more than one non-FIFA nationality.

No.	Pos.	Nation	Player
1	GK	CHI	Alan Chaparro
2	DF	CHI	Wilson Jara
3	MF	CHI	Alan Vergara
4	FW	CHI	Kevin Cifuentes
5	MF	CHI	Esteban Sáez
6	MF	CHI	Julio Inaí (captain)
7	FW	CHI	Felipe Escobar
8	MF	CHI	Sebastián Opazo
9	FW	CHI	Francisco Flores
10	MF	CHI	Edgar Melo
12	GK	CHI	José Acevedo
13	DF	CHI	Matías Gutiérrez
14	MF	CHI	Sebastián Hurtado

No.	Pos.	Nation	Player
15	FW	CHI	Ignacio Pinilla
16	FW	CHI	Aaron Villagra
17	DF	CHI	Manuel Cerda
18	MF	CHI	Claudio Sandoval
19	FW	ARG	Federico Paz
20	DF	CHI	Bladimir Fernandez
21	DF	CHI	Leonardo Ruiz
22	GK	CHI	José Roca
23	FW	CHI	Felipe Gallegos
24	MF	CHI	Gustavo Zamudio
25	GK	CHI	Diego Figueroa
26	MF	CHI	Dylan Astudillo
27	MF	CHI	Nicolás Fuentes

== See also ==
- Chilean football league system
