= Deportes Naval =

Chilean football club

Naval
- Full name: Club de Deportes Naval de Talcahuano
- Nicknames: Choreros, Ancla, Albiazules
- Founded: August 27, 1972
- Ground: Estadio El Morro; Talcahuano
- Capacity: 7,000
- Chairman: (Chile) Fernando Rojas
- Manager: (Chile) Patricio Almendra
- League: Segunda División
- 2015-16: 6th
Home colours	Away colours

Club de Deportes Naval de Talcahuano is a Chilean football club, their home town is Talcahuano, Biobío Region. They currently play at the fifth level of Chilean football, Tercera B of Chile.

The club were founded on August 27, 1972, as Club de Deportes Los Náuticos. In 1992 the club were called Deportes Talcahuano, and since 2004, Club de Deportes Naval. Their home games are played at the Estadio El Morro, which currently has a capacity of 7,000 seats.

== Titles ==
- Tercera División: 2

1999, 2008

== See also ==
- Chilean football league system
- Naval de Talcahuano
