= Deportes Iberia =

Chilean football club

Iberia
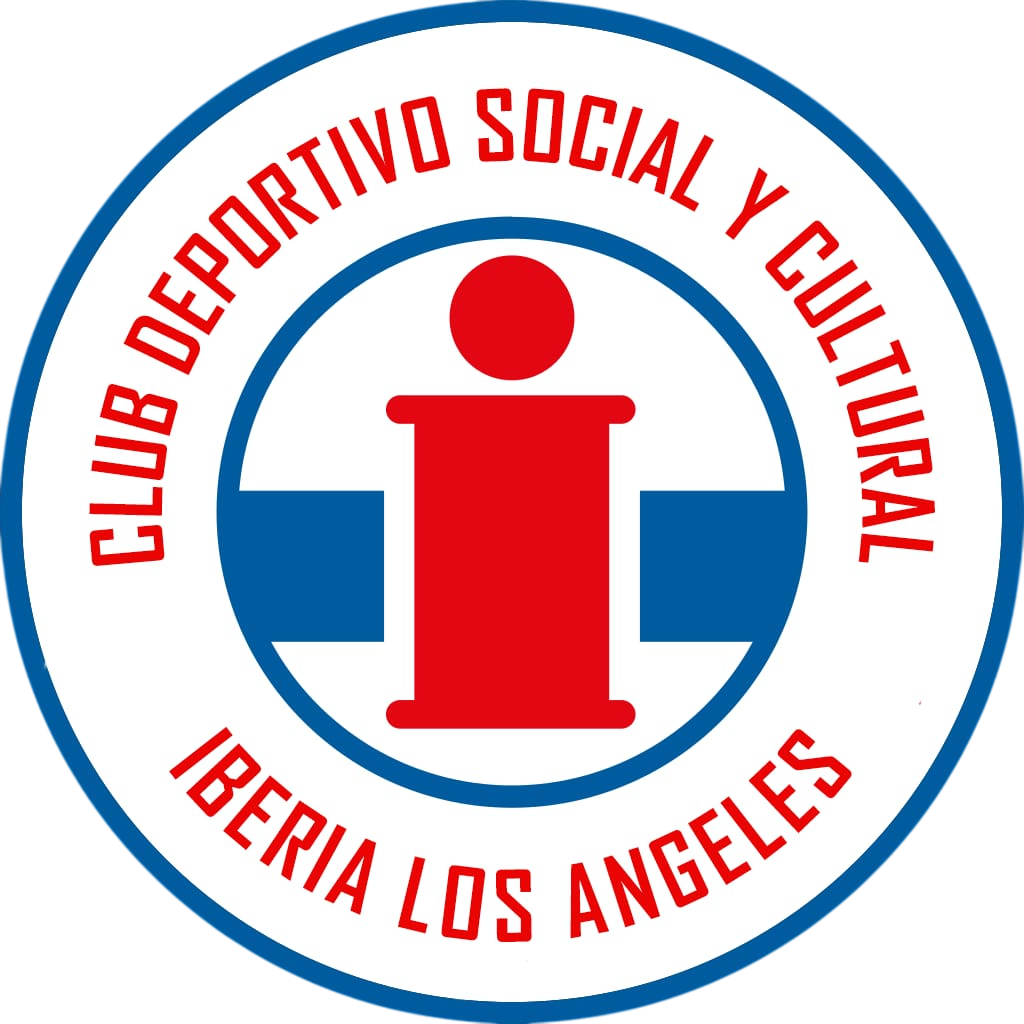
- CDSC Iberia Los Ángeles Logo
- Full name: Club Deportivo Social y Cultural Iberia Los Ángeles
- Nicknames: Iberianos, Azulgranas
- Founded: 15 June 1933; 93 years ago
- Ground: Estadio Municipal de Los Ángeles, Los Ángeles
- Capacity: 4150
- Chairman: Livio Silvia
- Manager: Giovanni Olivares
- League: Tercera B
- 2026: -
Home colours	Away colours

Deportes Iberia is a Chilean football club based in Los Ángeles that currently plays in Tercera División B (Fifth and final category). The club holds its home games at Estadio Municipal de Los Ángeles which has a capacity of 4,150 spectators.

In 1933, the club was officially established as Deportes Iberia, basing in Conchalí (Santiago). Then Iberia joined the Asociación de Fútbol de Santiago, but recently in 1946 the club joined Primera División, spending there eight years until the 1954 season when they, after finishing in the bottom of the table, were relegated to second-tier, being the first Chilean relegated team in its football history.

During its age playing at Segunda División on mid-1960s, the club moved to Puente Alto and stayed there two seasons from 1966 to 1968 before its definitely move to Los Ángeles at Bío Bío Region in 1969.

The team also has a rivalry with Malleco Unido from Angol as well as with Curicó Unido.

Iberia has won three Segunda División Profesional titles and a Copa Apertura Segunda División title in 1984.

== History ==
The institution was founded on June 15, 1933, by Cristian López, small merchants of La Vega Central Market and a Spanish catholic reverend called Gilberto Lizana, after the decision of that last one to create a football branch. At the end of that year and for only eight days, the team adopted the name of Deportivo Ínser.

In 1971, Iberia failed to reach its first ever promotion to first-level after losing the race for the title with Unión San Felipe of the coach Luis Santibáñez who even achieved a feat following proclaiming champion of Primera División in 1972.

In 1992, following 37 years playing in the second tier, the club was relegated to Tercera División. After winning the 2013–14 tournament, Iberia reached its promotion and broke a 21-year absence at second division, now called Primera B.

== Current squad ==
Current squad of Deportes Iberia as of 27 September 2021 (edit)
Sources: ANFP Official Web Site

No.		Position	Player
1	CHI	GK	Leonardo Canales
2	CHI	DF	Benjamín Briceño
3	CHI	DF	Diego Bravo
4	CHI	DF	Marcelo Flores
5	CHI	DF	Luciano Vargas
6	CHI	MF	Diego Ortega
7	CHI	MF	Camilo Pontoni
8	CHI	MF	Stefano Contreras
9	BRA	FW	Luiz Ferreira
10	CHI	MF	Gabriel Castillo
11	CHI	FW	Matías Contreras
12	CHI	GK	Martín Larraín
13	CHI	MF	Edgar Rodríguez
14	CHI	MF	José Higueras
15	CHI	FW	Freddy Barahona

No.		Position	Player
16	CHI	FW	Brian Leiva
17	CHI	FW	Benjamín Inostroza
18	CHI	MF	Yonathan Suazo
19	CHI	MF	Luis Oyarzo
20	CHI	DF	Diego Zambrano
21	CHI	FW	Diego González
22	CHI	DF	Andrés Reyes
23	CHI	GK	Claudio Abarca
24	CHI	FW	Leonardo Hernández
26	CHI	FW	Iván Sandoval
27	CHI	DF	Erick Millalén
28	CHI	MF	Cristóbal Díaz
32	ARG	MF	Andrés Lioi
36	CHI	DF	Cristóbal Parry
--	CHI	FW	Francisco Castro

Manager: Eduardo Lobos

=== 2021 Winter Transfers ===
==== In ====
Note: Flags indicate national team as defined under FIFA eligibility rules; some limited exceptions apply. Players may hold more than one non-FIFA nationality.

No.	Pos.	Nation	Player
22	DF	CHI	Andrés Reyes (free)
32	MF	ARG	Andrés Lioi (loan from San Luis)

No.	Pos.	Nation	Player
—	FW	CHI	Francisco Castro (from Cobreloa)

==== Out ====
Note: Flags indicate national team as defined under FIFA eligibility rules; some limited exceptions apply. Players may hold more than one non-FIFA nationality.

No.	Pos.	Nation	Player
14	FW	CHI	Nicolás Bascur (to Provincial Ranco)
30	FW	URU	Leandro Reymundez (released)

No.	Pos.	Nation	Player
—	MF	CHI	Benjamín Povea (to Pilmahue)

== Stadium ==
Estadio Municipal de Los Ángeles
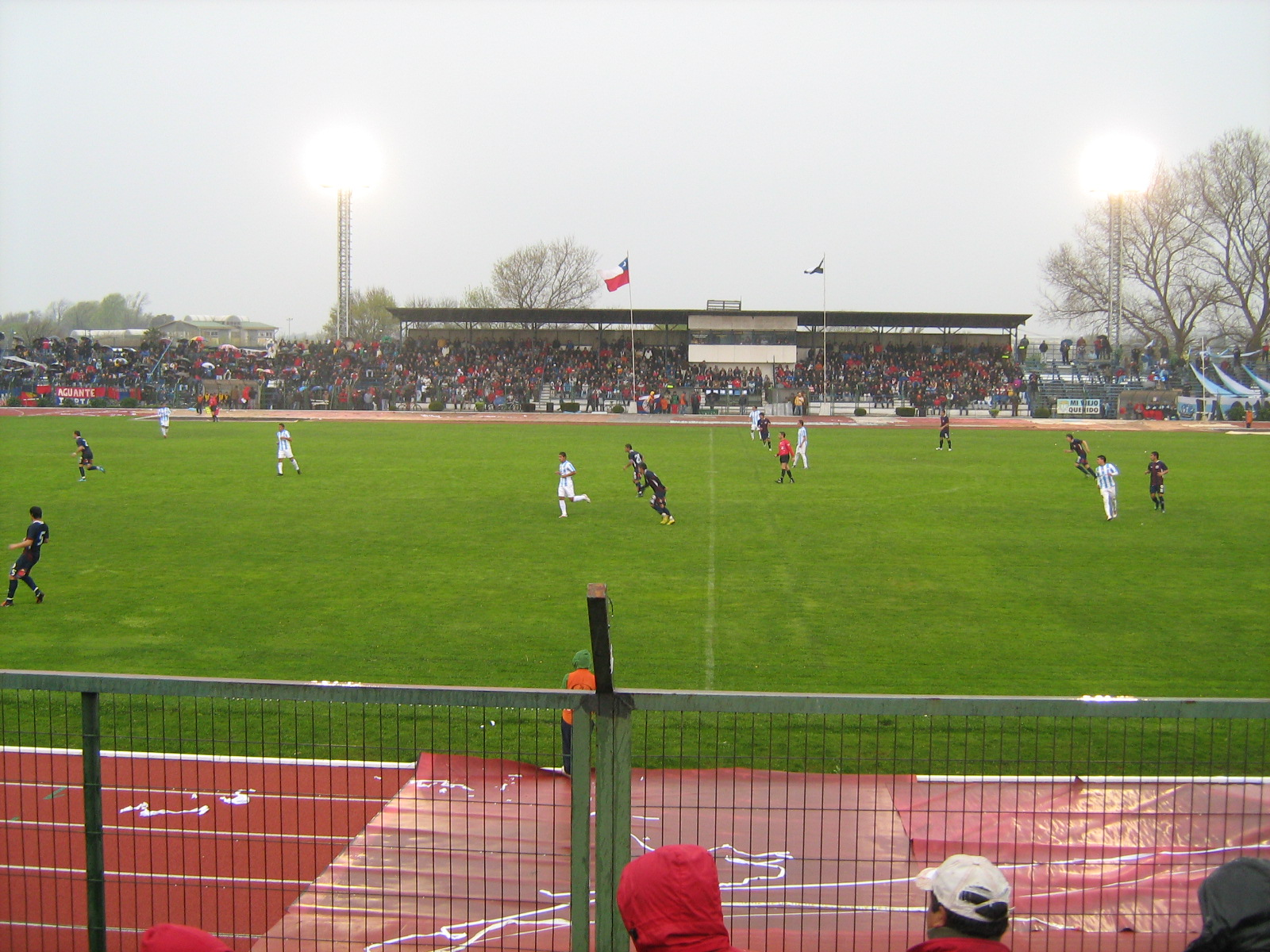
- Location: Los Ángeles, Chile
- Owner: Municipality of Los Angeles
- Operator: Iberia
- Capacity: 4,125

Tenant
- Iberia (1968–present)

Since Iberia moved from Puente Alto to Los Angeles in 1968 they play his home games at the Estadio Municipal de Los Ángeles which has a 4,125 capacity.

For a long time the ground was property of the public finance, but in 1990s the stadium became part of Los Angeles municipality. In August 2010, a running track financed by National Institute of Sports of Chile was built.

On 21 May 2015, President of Chile Michelle Bachelet through his public account realized in the National Congress at Valparaíso, announced that Ovalle, La Calera, San Felipe and Los Angeles would have new stadiums. Nevertheless, it was reported that in Los Angeles’ situation the new stadium wouldn't be remodeled for establish a new ground of 5,000 capacity.

== Managers ==
- (Chile) Giovanni Olivares (2025–)

== Honours ==
=== Professional ===
- Segunda División de Chile (3): 2012, 2013, 2013–14
- Copa Apertura Segunda División (1): 1984

=== Amateur ===
- División de Honor Amateur (1): 1945

== See also ==
- Chilean football league system
