= Chilean football league system =

The Chilean football league system, called the Campeonatos Nacionales de Fútbol en Chile or Liga Chilena de Fútbol in Spanish, is a series of interconnected leagues for football clubs in Chile.

== Men ==
=== 2024 ===
Level	League(s)/Division(s)
1	Primera División; 16 clubs
	↓↑ 2 clubs
2	Primera B 16 clubs
	↓↑ 1 club
3	Segunda División; 14 clubs
	↓↑ 2 clubs
4	Tercera A 14 clubs
	↓↑ 2 clubs
5	Tercera B 3 groups, 36 clubs
	↓ 6 clubs ↑ 7 clubs
	Asociaciones locales de fútbol de Chile

== Women ==
=== 2023 ===
Level	League(s)/Division(s)
1	Primera División; 14 clubs
	↓ 3 clubs ↑ 2 clubs
2	Primera B 4 groups, 22 clubs
