= Mario Cáceres =

Chilean footballer (born 1981)

Personal information
- Full name: Mario Antonio Cáceres Gómez
- Date of birth: 17 March 1981 (age 45)
- Place of birth: Santiago, Chile
- Height: 1.73 m (5 ft 8 in)
- Position: Striker

Senior career*
Years	Team	Apps	(Gls)
1998–2003	Colo-Colo	12	(1)
2000	→ Ñublense (loan)	15	(2)
2000	→ Everton (loan)	?	(16)
2001	→ Sporting CP B (loan)	7	(1)
2001	→ Sporting CP (loan)	1	(0)
2004	Universidad de Concepción		
2005	Lobos BUAP		
2005	Aris	21	(3)
2006	Colo-Colo	7	(0)
2007	PAS Giannina	7	(0)
2007–2008	Unión Española	30	(13)
2008–2010	St. Gallen	28	(7)
2010	San Luis	7	(0)
2011	Audax Italiano	17	(2)
2012–2013	Everton	34	(6)
2014	Deportes Temuco	12	(2)

International career
1997	Chile U17		
2001	Chile U20		
2004	Chile U23	5	(2)

Managerial career
- 2016: Colo-Colo (youth) (assistant)
- 2017: Cobreloa U13
- 2018–2022: Rodelindo Román (assistant)
- * Club domestic league appearances and goals

Mario Antonio Cáceres Gómez (born 17 March 1981) is a Chilean former footballer who played as a striker.

During his career, he played for Colo-Colo on three occasions (being nicknamed "El Petrolero" in his country), but also plied his trade in four countries.

== Club career ==
Born in the capital Santiago, Cáceres made his debut for Colo-Colo in 1998, but spent the following years on loan in the country, to Ñublense and Corporación Deportiva Everton de Viña del Mar respectively.

Caceres was signed by Sporting Clube de Portugal in January 2001, at the same time as compatriot Rodrigo Tello. Grossly unsettled he returned to Colo-Colo after just a few months, as the Lisbon club refused to activate the buying option it had on the player.

At the start of the 2004 season, Cáceres switched for C.D. Universidad de Concepción, but left the following year to Liga MX side Lobos de la BUAP.

Before the start of 2005's Apertura, Cáceres moved to another country, transferring to Greek team Aris FC, in the country's second level. In 2006, he rejoined Colo-Colo for a third stint, but returned to Greece and its division two the next year, with Pas Giannina FC.

Cáceres found some stability in the 2008 summer, going on to play two seasons at Switzerland's FC St. Gallen. Subsequently, he returned to his country, first joining San Luis de Quillota and going on to represent Audax Italiano, former team Everton and Deportes Temuco.

== International career ==
Cáceres capped for Chile at under-20 level, appearing at both the 2001 South American U-20 Championship and the 2001 FIFA World Youth Championship. He also played for the nation at the 2004 CONMEBOL Pre-Olympic tournament.

== Managerial career ==
He began his managerial career as an assistant coach in the Colo-Colo youth ranks and coach of Cobreloa at under-13 level. From 2018 to 2022, he worked as the assistant coach of Rodolfo Madrid in Rodelindo Román at minor categories of the Chilean football.

== Personal life ==
His nickname, El Petrolero (The Oilman), was given by the Chilean play-by-play commentator Claudio Palma, due to the fact that he had a hard time picking up speed during the matches, like the diesel cars.

His brother, Carlos Cáceres Gómez, is a former footballer who played in Indonesia for PS Palembang and current football coach who has worked for clubs such as Cobresal (women).

In 2015, he worked as a football commentator for the Chilean TV sports channel Canal del Fútbol.

== Honours ==
=== Club ===
Colo-Colo

- Primera División de Chile (3): 2002 Apertura, 2006 Apertura, 2006 Clausura
- Copa Sudamericana (1): Runner-up 2006
