= Jorge Lagües =

Chilean footballer (born 1997)

Personal information
- Full name: Jorge Sebastián Matías Lagües Suárez
- Date of birth: 22 January 1997 (age 29)
- Place of birth: Vallenar, Chile
- Height: 1.72 m (5 ft 8 in)
- Position: Defensive midfielder

Team information
- Current team: Deportes Rengo
- Number: 29

Youth career
- Colo-Colo

Senior career*
Years	Team	Apps	(Gls)
2015–2019	Colo-Colo	1	(0)
2016–2017	→ Deportes Vallenar (loan)	1	(0)
2017	→ Deportes Valdivia (loan)	13	(2)
2018	→ Fernández Vial (loan)	18	(0)
2019	San Antonio Unido	21	(4)
2020–2022	Rodelindo Román	37	(4)
2023–	Deportes Rengo	3	(0)
- * Club domestic league appearances and goals as of 9 July 2023

Jorge Sebastián Matías Lagües Suárez (born 22 January 1997) is a Chilean professional footballer who plays as a defensive midfielder for Deportes Rengo in the Segunda División Profesional de Chile.

== Career ==
A product of Colo-Colo's youth system, Lagües made his Primera División de Chile debut on 4 January 2015 in a 1–0 home defeat against San Marcos de Arica for the Torneo Clausura. He was sent to the field on 81st minute replacing Jaime Valdés. Likewise, he was member of Colo-Colo squad which won the 2016 Copa Chile.

In July 2017, he was loaned to Deportes Valdivia. He made his team debut on 9 July in a 2017 Copa Chile match against Huachipato. He scored his side's goal in a 1–2 home loss. During the Primera B de Chile season, he made 13 appearances and scored two goals: a) the only one goal in the sixth week's 1–0 home victory over Unión San Felipe; b) his side's goal in the 2–1 away loss with San Marcos de Arica.

In 2020, he joined Rodelindo Román.

== Honours ==
Colo-Colo

- Copa Chile: 2016
