= Diego Cuéllar =

Chilean footballer (born 1986)

Personal information
- Full name: Diego Ignacio Cuéllar Vásquez
- Date of birth: 22 November 1986 (age 39)
- Place of birth: Ovalle, Chile
- Height: 1.82 m (6 ft 0 in)
- Position: Forward

Team information
- Current team: Santiago City

Youth career
- Deportes Ovalle

Senior career*
Years	Team	Apps	(Gls)
2006–2009	Deportes Ovalle	–	(–)
2010–2011	Unión La Calera	22	(2)
2012	San Luis	27	(4)
2013	Deportes La Serena	8	(0)
2013–2014	Naval	12	(0)
2014–2016	Deportes Ovalle	61	(25)
2016–2018	Deportes Vallenar	68	(28)
2019	Deportes Recoleta	21	(7)
2020–2023	Lautaro de Buin	80	(40)
2024–2025	San Antonio Unido	34	(10)
2025	Unión San Felipe	12	(3)
2026	Provincial Ovalle	6	(1)
2026–	Santiago City	0	(0)
- * Club domestic league appearances and goals as of 3 August 2026

Diego Ignacio Cuéllar Vásquez (born 22 November 1986) is a Chilean professional footballer who plays as a forward for Santiago City.

== Career ==
In 2024, Cuéllar joined San Antonio Unido in the Segunda División Profesional de Chile. He switched to Unión San Felipe on 18 July 2025 until the end of the season.

On 28 January 2026, Cuéllar joined Provincial Ovalle. He switched to Santiago City for the second half of the year.

== Honours ==
Deportes Vallenar

- Segunda División: 2017 Transición
