= Manuel Gaete =

Chilean footballer (1948–2003)

- Gaete in 1972

Personal information
- Full name: Manuel Jesús Gaete Collao
- Date of birth: 5 January 1948
- Place of birth: Santiago, Chile
- Date of death: 25 June 2003 (aged 55)
- Place of death: Santiago, Chile
- Height: 1.74 m (5 ft 9 in)
- Position: Midfielder

Youth career
- Universidad Católica

Senior career*
Years	Team	Apps	(Gls)
1967–1969	Universidad Católica		
1970–1972	Unión San Felipe		
1973	Magallanes		
1974–1976	Unión Española		
1976	Huachipato		
1979	Naval de Talcahuano		

International career
1972–1974	Chile	3	(0)

Managerial career
- 1990–1992: Unión La Calera
- 1993–1994: Unión San Felipe
- 1994–1995: Unión La Calera
- 2002: Unión La Calera
- * Club domestic league appearances and goals

Manuel Jesús Gaete Collao (5 January 1948 – 25 June 2003) was a Chilean football player and manager who played as a midfielder. Nicknamed "Manolo", he played for various clubs within Chile including Universidad Católica, Unión San Felipe and Unión Española throughout the 1970s. He was named the Footballer of the Year in the 1971 edition. He also represented his home country of Chile in the Brazil Independence Cup.

== Career ==
Gaete would begin his career within the youth sector of Universidad Católica before making his top-flight debut in the 1967 Primera División de Chile. He would then play for Unión San Felipe beginning in the 1970 Segunda División de Chile where he would be part of the winning squad that would be promoted for the 1971 Primera División de Chile where the club would win their first title and qualifying for the 1972 Copa Libertadores where they would be eliminated in the first round. After briefly playing for Magallanes in 1973, he would play for Unión Española where he would win the 1974 Primera División de Chile and reach runners-up for the 1975 Copa Libertadores where he would play in the third and final match in the 1975 Copa Libertadores finals where they would lose 0–2 to Independiente at the Estadio Defensores del Chaco.

Following this, he would play for Huachipato in 1976 with his final season being with Naval de Talcahuano in 1979 before his retirement as a footballer.

== International career ==
He would briefly represent Chile through two matches of the Brazil Independence Cup in group stage matches against Ecuador and Portugal. He would also participate in the 1974 Copa Carlos Dittborn in the first of two matches on 7 November.

== Managerial career ==
His notable highlight as a football manager came in the 1990 season where with Unión La Calera, he would win the 1990 Tercera División de Chile where the club would be promoted to the Segunda División until leaving in 1992. He would also manage Unión San Felipe in 1993 and 1994 before returning to Unión La Calera in 1994, 1995 and 2002.

== Death ==
Gaete died on 25 June 2003.
