= Luis Felipe Maluenda =

Chilean footballer

Personal information
- Full name: Luis Felipe Hernández Maluenda
- Date of birth: 12 January 2004 (age 22)
- Place of birth: La Serena, Chile
- Height: 1.79 m (5 ft 10 in)
- Position: Winger

Team information
- Current team: Provincial Ovalle (on loan from Deportes Limache)
- Number: 11

Youth career
- Universidad Católica

Senior career*
| Years | Team | Apps | (Gls) |
| 2022–2025 | Universidad Católica | 5 | (0) |
| 2024 | → Deportes Copiapó (loan) | 2 | (0) |
| 2025 | → Santiago City (loan) | 10 | (3) |
| 2025 | Deportes Limache | 10 | (1) |
| 2026– | → Provincial Ovalle (loan) | 0 | (0) |

International career
| 2020–2021 | Chile U17 | | |
- * Club domestic league appearances and goals as of 22 January 2026

Luis Felipe Hernández Maluenda (born 12 January 2004), known as Luis Felipe Maluenda, is a Chilean footballer who plays as a winger for Provincial Ovalle on loan from Deportes Limache.

== Club career ==
Born in La Serena, Chile, Maluenda is a product of Universidad Católica. He was promoted to the first team under Ariel Holan, signed his first professional contract in 2022 and made his professional debut in the 1–3 away win against Unión San Felipe on 18 June 2022 for the Copa Chile. On 26 September of the same year, he underwent surgery for a cardiac arrhythmia.

In January 2024, Maluenda was loaned out to Deportes Copiapó in the Chilean Primera División. Back to Universidad Católica for the second half of the year, he suffered a knee injury. The next year, he was loaned out Santiago City.

In the second half of 2025, Maluenda signed with Deportes Limache in the Chilean top level. On 28 January 2026, Maluenda was loaned out to Provincial Ovalle.

== International career ==
Maluenda took part in training microcycles and friendlies with Chile at under-17 level in 2020 and 2021.
