= Claudio Abarca =

Chilean footballer (born 1994)

Personal information
- Full name: Claudio Antonio Abarca Gálvez
- Date of birth: 7 January 1994 (age 32)
- Place of birth: Santiago, Chile
- Height: 1.81 m (5 ft 11 in)
- Position: Goalkeeper

Team information
- Current team: Provincial Ovalle
- Number: 18

Youth career
- Palestino

Senior career*
Years	Team	Apps	(Gls)
2011–2016	Palestino		
2013	→ Barnechea (loan)		
2013–2014	→ Trasandino (loan)	1	(0)
2014–2015	→ San Antonio Unido (loan)		
2016	General Velásquez		
2017	Universidad Central		
2019	La Pintana Unida		
2021	Iberia	19	(0)
2022	Rodelindo Román	22	(0)
2023	Real San Joaquín	13	(0)
2023–2024	San Marcos	14	(0)
2025	Deportes Rengo	12	(2)
2026–	Provincial Ovalle	0	(0)

International career
2010	Chile U17		
- * Club domestic league appearances and goals as of 30 January 2026

Claudio Antonio Abarca Gálvez (born 7 January 1994) is a Chilean footballer who plays as a goalkeeper for Provincial Ovalle.

== Club career ==
A product of Palestino youth system, Abarca played on loan at Barnechea, Trasandino and San Antonio Unido.

After leaving Palestino, he played for General Velásquez before moving to Venezuelan side Universidad Central in 2017.

Back in Chile, he played for La Pintana Unida, Iberia and Rodelindo Román in 2022.

In the first half of 2023, he played for Real San Joaquín, and switched to San Marcos de Arica for the second half of the same year.

On 28 January 2026, Abarca joined Provincial Ovalle.

=== Controversies ===
In 2016, as a player of General Velásquez, Abarca kicked on the head to Diego Díaz, player of Deportivo Estación Central, and was punished with four years with no playing for a Chilean club.

== International career ==
Abarca represented Chile U17 at the 2010 South American Games.
