= Jorge Araya =

Jorge Araya may refer to:

- Jorge Araya (footballer, born 1924) (1924–1992), Chilean football forward
- Jorge Araya (footballer, born 1996), Chilean football midfielder for Deportes Melipilla
