= 1970 Campeonato Nacional Segunda División =

Segunda División
- Season: 1970
- Champions: Unión San Felipe
- Promoted: Unión San Felipe
- Relegated: Municipal de Santiago
- Top goalscorer: Ricardo Rojas Moya (25 goals); Unión San Felipe

The 1970 Segunda División de Chile was the 19th season of the Segunda División de Chile.

Unión San Felipe was the tournament's champion.

== Table ==
Pos	Team	Pld	W	D	L	GF	GA	GD	Pts	Promotion or qualification
1	Unión San Felipe (C)	26	14	8	4	62	40	+22	36	Champion. Promoted to 1971 Primera División de Chile.
2	Iberia	26	16	3	7	35	21	+14	35	
3	Naval	26	13	8	5	46	24	+22	34	
4	San Luis de Quillota	26	14	6	6	52	29	+23	34	
5	Lister Rossel	26	11	6	9	37	45	−8	28	
6	Deportes Ovalle	26	10	6	10	45	36	+9	26	
7	Deportes Colchagua	26	7	12	7	46	44	+2	26	
8	Coquimbo Unido	26	4	15	7	30	35	−5	23	
9	Ferroviarios	26	8	7	11	37	50	−13	23	
10	San Antonio Unido	26	8	6	12	32	44	−12	22	
11	Bádminton	26	5	10	11	35	48	−13	20	
12	Ñublense	26	6	7	13	38	48	−10	19	Relegation Playoffs
13	Santiago Morning	26	6	7	13	28	43	−15	19	Relegation Playoffs
14	Municipal de Santiago	26	6	7	13	28	44	−16	19	Relegation Playoffs

Source: rsssf.com
(C) Champions

== Relegation Playoffs ==
Pos	Team	Pld	W	D	L	GF	GA	GD	Pts	Relegation
1	Santiago Morning	2	2	0	0	12	2	+10	4	
2	Ñublense	2	1	0	1	3	7	−4	2	
3	Municipal de Santiago	2	0	0	2	2	8	−6	0	Relegated

Source: rsssf.com

== See also ==
- Chilean football league system
