= Andrés Díaz =

Andrés Díaz may refer to:

- Andrés Díaz (cellist) (born 1964), cellist, Associate Professor at Southern Methodist University
- Andrés Díaz (runner) (born 1969), Spanish middle-distance runner
- Andrés Díaz (Argentine footballer) (born 1983), Argentine football midfielder
- Andrés Díaz (Chilean footballer) (born 1995), Chilean football midfielder

== See also ==
- André Dias (born 1979), Brazilian football defender
