= Mauro Maureira =

Argentine-Chilean footballer (born 2001)

Personal information
- Full name: Mauro Jesús Maureira Maureira
- Date of birth: 1 June 2001 (age 25)
- Place of birth: Mendoza, Argentina
- Height: 1.70 m (5 ft 7 in)
- Position: Midfielder

Team information
- Current team: Provincial Ovalle

Youth career
- Unión Española

Senior career*
Years	Team	Apps	(Gls)
2019–2023	Unión Española	8	(0)
2022	→ Deportes Santa Cruz (loan)	12	(1)
2024	Santiago City	–	(–)
2025	Provincial Osorno	11	(0)
2026–	Provincial Ovalle	0	(0)
- * Club domestic league appearances and goals as of 6 March 2026

Mauro Jesús Maureira Maureira (born 1 June 2001) is an Argentine-Chilean footballer who plays as a midfielder for Provincial Ovalle.

== Career ==
A product of Unión Española youth system, Maureira made his professional debut in the 2019 season in a match against Colo-Colo. For the 2022 season, he was loaned to Deportes Santa Cruz in the Primera B de Chile.

In 2024, Maureira signed with Santiago City in the Chilean Tercera A.

On 19 February 2026, Maureira joined Provincial Ovalle.

At international level, he was called up to the Chile under-20 squad for the 2020 Granja Comary Tournament in Teresópolis, Brazil.

== Career statistics ==
=== Club ===
As of 24 November 2019.

Club	Season	League			Cup		Continental		Other		Total	
Club	Season	Division	Apps	Goals	Apps	Goals	Apps	Goals	Apps	Goals	Apps	Goals
Unión Española	2019	Chilean Primera División	3	0	1 (Note: Appearances in the Copa Chile)	0	0	0	0	0	4	0
Career total			3	0	1	0	0	0	0	0	4	0
