= Eladio Herrera =

Eladio Herrera may refer to:

- Eladio Herrera (boxer) (born 1930), former Argentine boxer
- Eladio Herrera (footballer) (born 1984), Chilean footballer
