= Sebastián Contreras (footballer, born 1995) =

Chilean footballer

Personal information
- Full name: Sebastián Andrés Contreras Moreno
- Date of birth: 16 May 1995 (age 31)
- Place of birth: Calama, Chile
- Height: 1.84 m (6 ft 1/2 in)
- Position: Centre-back

Team information
- Current team: Provincial Ovalle
- Number: 4

Youth career
- Santiago Morning

Senior career*
Years	Team	Apps	(Gls)
2014–2019	Santiago Morning	66	(0)
2020–2022	Juventud Las Piedras	27	(0)
2021	→ Ñublense (loan)	4	(0)
2022	San Antonio Unido	20	(0)
2023	Iberia	21	(2)
2024	Deportes Rengo	23	(0)
2025	Unión San Felipe	11	(0)
2026–	Provincial Ovalle	0	(0)
- * Club domestic league appearances and goals as of 30 January 2026

Sebastián Andrés Contreras Moreno (born 16 May 1995) is a Chilean footballer who plays as a centre-back for Provincial Ovalle.

== Career ==
A left-footed centre-back from the Santiago Morning youth system, Contreras played for them until the 2019 season.

In 2020, he moved abroad and signed with Uruguayan club Juventud Las Piedras, joining his compatriots Gonzalo Reyes, Christian Bravo and Marcelo Allende in the Uruguayan football. In the second half of 2021, he was loaned to Ñublense in the Chilean top division.

Back in Chile, Contreras joined San Antonio Unido in May 2022. For the 2023 season, he switched to Iberia.

In 2024, Contreras played for Deportes Rengo. The next year, he joined Unión San Felipe.

On 28 January 2026, Contreras joined Provincial Ovalle.
