= Daniel Malhue =

Chilean footballer (born 1995)

Personal information
- Full name: Daniel Ignacio Malhue Toro
- Date of birth: 13 February 1995 (age 31)
- Place of birth: Santiago, Chile
- Height: 1.73 m (5 ft 8 in)
- Position: Forward

Youth career
- Colo-Colo

Senior career*
Years	Team	Apps	(Gls)
2012–2014	Colo-Colo B	25	(2)
2014–2017	Colo-Colo	0	(0)
2015	→ Trasandino (loan)	25	(13)
2016–2017	→ Coquimbo Unido (loan)	22	(1)
2018	Deportes Temuco	7	(0)
2019–2021	Rodelindo Román	15	(2)
2024–2025	Kansas City Comets (indoor)	12	(2)
2025	Tallahassee (seven-a-side)	–	(–)
- * Club domestic league appearances and goals as of 31 December 2025

Daniel Ignacio Malhue Toro (born February 13, 1995) is a Chilean footballer who plays as a forward.

== Career ==
After playing for Deportes Temuco at the Chilean Primera División, on 2019 he joined Rodelindo Román at the Chilean Tercera B, the fifth category of the Chilean football. After two years at amateur leagues, along with Rodelindo Román he got promotion to the Chilean Segunda División for the 2021 season.

Malhue moved to the United States and signed with MASL club Kansas City Comets on 29 November 2024. In 2025, he played for seven-a-side football club Tallahassee alongside his former fellow in Colo-Colo, Jorge Araya. They won the Premium Cup in Atlanta.

== Personal life ==
Malhue is the brother-in-law of the Chile international footballer Arturo Vidal, since he is married to his younger sister, Victoria, with whom he has a son.

== Honours ==
Rodelindo Román

- Tercera B: 2019

Tallahassee

- Premium Cup: 2025
