= Iván Contreras (footballer) =

Chilean footballer (born 2001)

Personal information
- Full name: Iván Alejandro Contreras Araya
- Date of birth: 26 July 2001 (age 25)
- Place of birth: El Salvador, Chile
- Height: 1.75 m (5 ft 9 in)
- Position: Defensive midfielder

Youth career
- 2013–2019: Colo-Colo

Senior career*
| Years | Team | Apps | (Gls) |
| 2019 | Colo-Colo | 0 | (0) |
| 2020–2024 | Cobresal | 37 | (0) |
| 2024 | → Barnechea (loan) | 2 | (0) |
| 2025 | Provincial Ovalle | 0 | (0) |
- * Club domestic league appearances and goals as of 31 December 2025

Iván Alejandro Contreras Araya (born 26 July 2001) is a Chilean footballer who plays as a defensive midfielder.

== Club career ==
Born in El Salvador, Chile, Contreras was trained at Colo-Colo and signed with Cobresal in 2020, making his debut in the 2020 Chilean Primera División. In February 2024, he was loaned out to Barnechea.

In 2025, Contreras joined Provincial Ovalle in the Segunda División Profesional de Chile.

== Style of play ==
Contreras can operate as a defensive midfielder, centre-back or full-back.
