= Luis Lee-Chong =

Chilean footballer

Personal information
- Full name: Luis Antonio Lee-Chong Pinilla
- Place of birth: Chile
- Position: Midfielder

Youth career
- Ferroviarios

Senior career*
Years	Team	Apps	(Gls)
- Ferroviarios
- Trasandino
- Deportes Arica
- Deportes Iberia
- * Club domestic league appearances and goals

Luis Antonio Lee-Chong Pinilla is a Chilean former footballer who played as a midfielder.

== Club career ==
As a player, Lee-Chong was a midfielder, and played for Ferroviarios, before going on to play professionally for Trasandino. He also played for Deportes Arica and Deportes Iberia before retiring in 1983 due to a fractured tibia and fibula.

== Coaching career ==
Following his retirement, Lee-Chong founded the escuela de fútbol Recoleta-Chacabuco in 2002; an academy responsible for the development of professional footballers Jeisson Vargas, Carlos Palacios and Pablo Aránguiz. In total, the academy has produced over 50 professional footballers.

== Personal life ==
Lee-Chong's father, Chong Lee Lam (known in Chile as Benito Lee Chong Lam), fled his native China to avoid the rising tensions between China and Japan, as well as the Chinese Civil War, arriving in Chile in 1928. He went on to run a butchers shop in Santiago, and had six children, including Luis, as well as Óscar, who also went on to play football.

His nephews Jaime Carreño and Felipe Lee-Chong, are also professional footballers.
