= Real Juventud =

Real Juventud may refer to:

- C.D. Real Juventud, Honduran football club based in Santa Bárbara, Santa Bárbara
- Real Juventud San Joaquín, also called Real San Joaquín, Chilean football club based in the city San Joaquín, Chile
