= Felipe Lee-Chong =

Chilean footballer (born 1997)

Personal information
- Full name: Felipe Wang-Xi Lee-Chong Cartes
- Date of birth: 21 October 1997 (age 29)
- Height: 1.78 m (5 ft 10 in)
- Position: Right-back

Team information
- Current team: Deportes Linares
- Number: 19

Youth career
- Unión Española
- 2015–2016: Audax Italiano

Senior career*
Years	Team	Apps	(Gls)
2016–2017	Deportes Puerto Montt	1	(0)
2018–2020	Rodelindo Román	–	(–)
2020–2021	Trasandino	–	(–)
2021–2022	Deportes Recoleta	12	(1)
2022–2024	Trasandino	41	(3)
2025–	Deportes Linares	1	(0)
- * Club domestic league appearances and goals as of 4 May 2025

Felipe Wang-Xi Lee-Chong Cartes (born 21 October 1997) is a Chilean footballer who plays as a right-back for Deportes Linares.

== Club career ==
Lee-Chong made his professional debut in 2016 for Puerto Montt, playing 90 minutes in a 1–1 Primera B de Chile draw with Deportes La Serena. Despite this appearance, he left Puerto Montt at the end of the season, before joining Tercera A side Rodelindo Román. He joined Trasandino in 2020, but due to the COVID-19 pandemic in Chile, he was unable to play the full season, and resorted to selling hamburgers with his cousin to make a living.

He returned to professional football in 2021, signing with Segunda División side Deportes Recoleta. Despite helping the club to promotion, he was released at the end of the season, returning to Trasandino, who were now in the Segunda División. He renewed his contract with Trasandino for the 2023 season.

== Personal life ==
Lee-Chong's grandfather, Chong Lee Lam (known in Chile as Benito Lee Chong Lam), fled his native China to avoid the rising tensions between China and Japan, as well as the Chinese Civil War, arriving in Chile in 1928. He went on to run a butchers shop in Santiago, and had six children, including Óscar and Luis, both of whom went on to play football.

Felipe is the son of Óscar Lee-Chong, and the nephew of Luis. His cousin, Jaime Carreño, is also a professional footballer. In 2019, he spent time on trial with then-Chinese Super League side Jiangsu Suning, and unsuccessfully attempted to gain Chinese nationality.

He has a son, also named Óscar, who was born in 2018.

== Career statistics ==
=== Club ===
As of 23 February 2023.

Appearances and goals by club, season and competition
Club	Season	League			Cup		Other		Total	
Club	Season	Division	Apps	Goals	Apps	Goals	Apps	Goals	Apps	Goals
Puerto Montt	2016–17	Primera B de Chile	1	0	0	0	0	0	1	0
Deportes Recoleta	2021	Segunda División	12	1	0	0	0	0	12	1
Trasandino	2022	Segunda División	20	2	1 (Note: Appearances in the Copa Chile)	0	0	0	21	2
Career total			33	3	1	0	0	0	34	3
