= Rónald González =

Rónald González may refer to:

- Rónald González (cyclist) (born 1981), Venezuelan professional racing cyclist
- Rónald González (Costa Rican footballer) (born 1970), Costa Rican football (soccer) player
- Ronald González (Chilean footballer) (born 1990), Chilean football player
