= Christian Lovrincevich =

Argentine football manager

Personal information
- Full name: Christian Jorge Lovrincevich
- Date of birth: 26 September 1974 (age 52)
- Place of birth: San Telmo, Buenos Aires, Argentina
- Position: Forward

Youth career
- Years: Team
- 1983–1989: River Plate

Managerial career
- 1993–1999: Huracán (youth)
- 1999–2001: Quilmes (youth)
- 2002–2005: Argentinos Juniors (youth)
- 2006: Barcelona Academy
- 2007–2008: Rosario Central (youth)
- 2009: Comunicaciones (youth)
- 2010–2011: Estudiantes LP (youth)
- 2013–2014: All Boys (reserves)
- 2014: San Jorge
- 2014–2015: Central Norte
- 2016: Unión San Felipe
- 2017: Unión La Calera
- 2017: Juan Aurich
- 2018: Unión San Felipe
- 2019: Sport Boys Warnes (assistant)
- 2020: Orense (youth)
- 2020–2021: Banfield (assistant)
- 2023: Cipolletti
- 2023–2024: Deportes Concepción
- 2024: Unión San Felipe
- 2025: San Antonio Unido

Christian Jorge Lovrincevich (born 26 September 1974) is an Argentine football manager.

== Career ==
As a football forward, Lovrincevich was trained at River Plate and played for a club in a low category of the Argentine football. As a football coach, he started his career working at the Huracán youth system, aged 21. He continued working for youth systems of important clubs in his homeland such as Argentinos Juniors, Rosario Central, Estudiantes de La Plata, among others.

After coaching the All Boys reserve team, Lovrincevich started to manage senior teams in 2014 with San Jorge de Tucumán and Central Norte.

In 2016, Lovrincevich moved abroad and assumed as manager of Chilean club Unión San Felipe. The next year, he led Unión La Calera in Chile and Juan Aurich in the Peruvian Primera División. In 2018, me returned to Unión San Felipe.

After serving as coach for the Orense youth ranks and assistant coach in Banfield, he was appointed as manager of Cipolletti in 2023.

Lovrincevich returned to Chile with Deportes Concepción (2023–24), Unión San Felipe (2024) and San Antonio Unido (2025).

Lovrincevich has also developed a career as a football teacher.

== Personal life ==
Lovrincevich if of Spanish and Croatian descent.
