= Sebastián Contreras =

Sebastián Contreras may refer to:

- Sebastián Contreras (footballer, born 1988), Chilean football goalkeeper
- Sebastián Contreras (Argentine footballer) (born 1990), Argentine football midfielder
- Sebastián Contreras (footballer, born 1995), Chilean football centre-back for Iberia
