= Nicolás Forttes =

Chilean footballer

Personal information
- Full name: Nicolás Forttes Rojas
- Date of birth: 11 April 1997 (age 29)
- Place of birth: Vitacura, Santiago, Chile
- Position: Winger

Team information
- Current team: Real San Joaquín
- Number: 7

Youth career
- Universidad de Chile

Senior career*
Years	Team	Apps	(Gls)
2016–2017	Universidad de Chile	0	(0)
2016–2017	→ Alcanenense (loan)	14	(1)
2017–2021	Deportes Copiapó	30	(2)
2019	→ Fernández Vial (loan)	9	(0)
2020–2021	→ Colchagua (loan)	19	(2)
2021	Eendracht Aalter	–	(–)
2021	Lautaro de Buin	8	(1)
2021	→ Deportes Melipilla (loan)	2	(0)
2022	Trasandino	18	(3)
2023–2024	San Antonio Unido	30	(1)
2024	Deportes Linares	13	(2)
2025	Santiago Morning	1	(0)
2025–	Real San Joaquín	0	(0)
- * Club domestic league appearances and goals as of 6 March 2026

Nicolás Forttes Rojas (born 1 April 1997) is a Chilean professional footballer who plays as a winger for Real San Joaquín.

== Career ==
Born in Vitacura, Santiago de Chile, Forttes is a product of Universidad de Chile youth system and served as sparring of the Chile national team. In 2017, he was loaned to Portuguese club AC Alcanenense.

Back in Chile, he joined Deportes Copiapó in the second half of 2017. Later, he spent two seasons on loan with Fernández Vial and Colchagua in 2019 and 2020–21, respectively.

In 2021, he had a brief stint with Belgian club Eendracht Aalter before joining Lautaro de Buin, being loaned to Deportes Melipilla in the Chilean top division in the same year.

In 2022, Forttes joined Trasandino, switching to San Antonio Unido the next season. In the second half of 2024, he joined Deportes Linares.

During 2025, Forttes was with Santiago Morning. On 28 February 2026, he joined Real San Joaquín.

=== Controversies ===
As a player of Deportes Melipilla, on loan from Lautaro de Buin, he was involved in regulation issues about double contracts, since he would have received a pay from an external employer to get an upper salary. Another players such as José Barrera and Hans Martínez were also involved, as well as the coach Carlos Encinas.

== Style of play ==
Forttes has mainly developed his career as an attacking winger. However, he played also as a right wing-back in his stint with the Universidad de Chile youth ranks.

== Personal life ==
As a student, Forttes attended the Saint George's College and was the football team captain.
