= Miguel Escalona (Chilean footballer) =

Chilean footballer (born 1990)

Personal information
- Full name: Miguel Andrés Escalona Armijo
- Date of birth: 23 March 1990 (age 36)
- Place of birth: Santiago, Chile
- Height: 1.78 m (5 ft 10 in)
- Position: Defender

Team information
- Current team: Real San Joaquín
- Number: 5

Youth career
- Palestino

Senior career*
Years	Team	Apps	(Gls)
2008–2014	Palestino	92	(5)
2014–2017	Cobresal	77	(3)
2018–2021	Deportes Melipilla	83	(1)
2022	Cobreloa	20	(1)
2024	Provincial Ovalle	17	(1)
2025	Deportes Melipilla	1	(0)
2026–	Real San Joaquín	0	(0)
- * Club domestic league appearances and goals as of 4 May 2025

Miguel Andrés Escalona Armijo (born 23 March 1990) is a Chilean footballer who plays as a defender for Real San Joaquín in the Segunda División Profesional de Chile.

== Career ==
After being a free agent during 2023, Escalona signed with Provincial Ovalle in the Segunda División Profesional de Chile for the 2024 season.

== Honours ==
=== Player ===
Palestino

- Primera División de Chile (1): Runner-up 2008 Clausura

Cobresal

- Primera División de Chile (1): 2015 Clausura
