= Ángel Rojas (footballer, born 1997) =

Chilean footballer

Personal information
- Full name: Ángel Rafael Rojas Martínez
- Date of birth: 20 October 1997 (age 29)
- Place of birth: Requínoa, Chile
- Height: 1.80 m (5 ft 11 in)
- Position: Defender

Youth career
- 2013–2016: Colo-Colo

Senior career*
| Years | Team | Apps | (Gls) |
| 2013 | Colo-Colo B | 1 | (0) |
| 2016–2018 | Colo-Colo | 0 | (0) |
| 2018 | → Malleco Unido (loan) | 21 | (2) |
| 2019 | San Antonio Unido | 11 | (0) |
| 2019 | AD Oliveirense | 10 | (0) |
| 2020–2022 | Rodelindo Román | 26 | (1) |
- * Club domestic league appearances and goals as of 23 August 2023

Ángel Rafael Rojas Martínez (born 20 October 1997) is a Chilean professional footballer who plays as a defender. He last played for Rodelindo Román.

== Career ==
A left-footed defender, Rojas came to the Colo-Colo youth system at the age of fifteen and made his debut with the B-team in the 2013–14 Segunda División Profesional. As a member of the under-19 team, he won both the national championship (Apertura) and the champions cup in July and December 2017, respectively, alongside players such as Omar Carabalí, Iván Morales, Branco Provoste, among others. Promoted to the first team by the coach José Luis Sierra, he was a member of the squad that won both the 2017 Transición and the 2017 Supercopa de Chile.

In 2018, he was loaned to Malleco Unido, making twenty two appearances with two goals. After having no chances at his return to Colo-Colo, he switched to San Antonio Unido in 2019.

In the second half of 2019, he moved abroad and signed with Portuguese club AD Oliveirense, thanks to Manuel Crespo, a former coach of the Colo-Colo youth ranks.

Back in Chile, he spent three seasons with Rodelindo Román from 2020 to 2022 until the club was relegated to the amateur football for the 2023 season.
