= Martín Lara =

Chilean footballer

Personal information
- Full name: Martín Alonso Lara Collao
- Date of birth: 28 December 2000 (age 25)
- Place of birth: Valparaíso, Chile
- Height: 1.68 m (5 ft 6 in)
- Position: Midfielder

Team information
- Current team: Provincial Ovalle

Youth career
- Universidad Católica
- 2019: Necaxa

Senior career*
Years	Team	Apps	(Gls)
2019–2021	Necaxa	0	(0)
2020	→ Universidad de Concepción (loan)	9	(0)
2021	→ Deportes Melipilla (loan)	12	(0)
2022	Deportes Temuco	25	(2)
2023–2025	San Antonio Unido	65	(3)
2026–	Provincial Ovalle	0	(0)

International career
2017	Chile U17	13	(0)
- * Club domestic league appearances and goals as of 30 January 2026

Martín Alonso Lara Collao (born 28 December 2000) is a Chilean footballer who plays as a midfielder for Provincial Ovalle.

== Club career ==
Lara was trained at Universidad Católica. In January 2019, he moved abroad and signed with Liga MX club Necaxa. He made his professional debut in the 2–2 draw against Dorados de Sinaloa for the 2019–20 Copa MX on 14 August 2019.

In 2020, Lara returned to Chile and joined Universidad de Concepción in the Chilean Primera División on a one-year loan from Necaxa. In 2021, Lara continued in the Chilean top level with Deportes Melipilla.

In 2022, Lara signed with Deportes Temuco. The next year, he switched to San Antonio Unido.

On 28 January 2026, Lara joined Provincial Ovalle.

== International career ==
Meléndez represented Chile at under-17 level in the 2017 South American Championship, the 2017 FIFA World Cup and some friendlies.
