= Víctor González (footballer, born 1994) =

Chilean footballer (born 1994)

Personal information
- Full name: Víctor Miguel González Chang
- Date of birth: 30 May 1994 (age 32)
- Place of birth: Chuquicamata, Chile
- Height: 1.78 m (5 ft 10 in)
- Position: Centre-back

Team information
- Current team: Santiago City

Youth career
- –2015: Colo-Colo

Senior career*
Years	Team	Apps	(Gls)
2012–2014	Colo-Colo B	21	(0)
2015–2016	San Antonio Unido	27	(1)
2016–2019	Deportes Valdivia	71	(0)
2020–2022	Coquimbo Unido	41	(2)
2021	→ Unión La Calera (loan)	17	(0)
2023–2024	Deportes Temuco	54	(3)
2025	Santiago Wanderers	24	(0)
2026–	Santiago City	0	(0)
- * Club domestic league appearances and goals as of 5 December 2025

Víctor Miguel González Chang (born 30 May 1994) is a Chilean footballer who plays as a defender for Santiago City.

== Career ==
After playing for Colo-Colo B at the Segunda División, the third level of Chilean football, until 2013–14 season, González had no chances to play in the professional squad on 2014–15 season. So, he joined San Antonio Unido on second half year 2016.

Playing for Deportes Valdivia at the Primera B he achieved consistency, what carried him to join Coquimbo Unido for playing at the both Primera División and Copa Sudamericana by first time on 2020.

González joined Deportes Temuco for the 2023 season. He switched to Santiago Wanderers for the 2025 season.

In February 2026, González signed with Santiago City.

== Career statistics ==
=== Club ===
As of 14 February 2021.

Club	Season	League			Cup		Continental		Other		Total	
Club	Season	Division	Apps	Goals	Apps	Goals	Apps	Goals	Apps	Goals	Apps	Goals
Colo-Colo B (loan)	2012	Segunda; División	7	0	—		—		0	0	7	0
Colo-Colo B (loan)	2013–T	Segunda; División	6	0	—		—		0	0	6	0
Colo-Colo B (loan)	2013–14	Segunda; División	8	0	—		—		0	0	8	0
Colo-Colo B (loan)	Total		21	0	—		—		0	0	21	0
San Antonio; Unido	2015–16	Segunda; División	27	1	0	0	—		0	0	27	1
Deportes; Valdivia	2016–17	Primera B	21	0	0	0	—		0	0	21	0
Deportes; Valdivia	2017–T	Primera B	12	0	0	0	—		0	0	12	0
Deportes; Valdivia	2018	Primera B	24	0	7	0	—		0	0	31	0
Deportes; Valdivia	2019	Primera B	14	0	0	0	—		0	0	14	0
Deportes; Valdivia	Total		71	0	7	0	—		0	0	78	0
Coquimbo; Unido	2020	Primera; División	27	1	—		9 (Note: Appearances in the Copa Sudamericana)	1	0	0	36	2
Unión La; Calera (loan)	2021	Primera; División	0	0	0	0	0 (Note: Appearances in the Copa Libertadores)	0	0	0	0	0
Total career			146	2	7 (Note: Appearances in the Copa Chile)	0	9	1	0	0	162	3
