= Hernán Madrid =

Palestinian footballer (born 1981)

Personal information
- Full name: Hernán Antonio Madrid Cataldo
- Date of birth: 2 April 1981 (age 45)
- Place of birth: La Calera, Chile
- Height: 1.77 m (5 ft 9 1/2 in)
- Position: Central defender

Team information
- Current team: Universidad Católica (youth) (coach)

Youth career
- Cemento Melón
- Universidad Católica

Senior career*
Years	Team	Apps	(Gls)
1997–2000	Universidad Católica	0	(0)
2001	San Luis	–	(–)
2002–2005	Unión La Calera		
2006	Universidad Católica	1	(0)
2007	Deportes Antofagasta	24	(0)
2008	Huachipato	26	(1)
2009	Unión La Calera	29	(1)
2010	Wadi Al-Nes	–	(–)

International career
2004	Palestine	1	(0)

Managerial career
- 2011–2012: Deportes Iquique (assistant)
- 2014: Deportes Temuco (assistant)
- 2014: Cobreloa (assistant)
- 2015: San Marcos (assistant)
- 2015–2016: Unión Española (assistant)
- 2016–2017: Deportes Antofagasta (assistant)
- 2017: Unión San Felipe
- 2018: Unión San Felipe
- 2020–: Universidad Católica (youth)
- 2022: Universidad Católica (assistant)
- * Club domestic league appearances and goals

Hernán Antonio Madrid Cataldo (born April 2, 1981) is a football coach and former footballer who played as a central defender. Born in Chile, he represented the Palestine national team. He is currently in charge of the Universidad Católica under-21 team.

== Teams ==
=== Player ===
- (Chile) Cemento Melón (youth)
- (Chile) Universidad Católica 1997–2000
- (Chile) San Luis de Quillota 2001
- (Chile) Unión La Calera 2002–2005
- (Chile) Universidad Católica 2006
- (Chile) Deportes Antofagasta 2007
- (Chile) Huachipato 2008
- (Chile) Unión La Calera 2009
- (Palestine) Wadi Al-Nes 2010

=== Manager ===
- (Chile) Unión San Felipe 2017
- (Chile) Unión San Felipe 2018
- (Chile) Universidad Católica U21 2022–

== International ==
A naturalized Palestinian, Madrid represented the Palestine national team.
