= Gustavo Fuentealba =

Chilean footballer (born 1994)

Personal information
- Full name: Gustavo Nicolás Fuentealba Tobar
- Date of birth: 31 October 1994 (age 32)
- Place of birth: Coronel, Chile
- Position: Goalkeeper

Youth career
- Huachipato
- Universidad de Concepción

Senior career*
Years	Team	Apps	(Gls)
2014–2016	Lota Schwager	22	(0)
2016–2017	Fernández Vial	–	(–)
2018	Independiente Cauquenes	19	(0)
2019	Deportes Vallenar	0	(0)
2019	Deportes Quillón	–	(–)
2019–2021	Deportes La Serena	3	(0)
2021	Deportes Puerto Montt	4	(0)
2022	Deportes La Serena	3	(0)
2023	Unión Bellavista	–	(–)
2024	Unión Compañías	–	(–)
2024	Deportes Linares	2	(0)
Total		53	(0)
- * Club domestic league appearances and goals

Gustavo Nicolás Fuentealba Tobar (born 31 October 1994) is a Chilean former professional footballer who played as a goalkeeper.

== Career ==
Fuentealba started his career with Chilean second division side Lota Schwager, where he suffered relegation to the third division.

For the 2020 season, Fuentealba signed for La Serena in the Chilean top flight from fifth division club Deportes Quillón.

Fuentealba has played in the Chilean fifth, fourth, third, second divisions as well as the top flight.

In 2023, he joined Unión Bellavista from Coquimbo for the Copa Chile, alongside former professional players such as Ángel Carreño, Eladio Herrera, Mario Aravena, Renato Tarifeño, Gary Tello, among others. The next year, he joined Unión Compañías in the Tercera A. His last club was Deportes Linares in 2024.

Fuentealba confirmed his retirement in February 2025.
