= Renato Tarifeño =

Chilean footballer (born 1996)

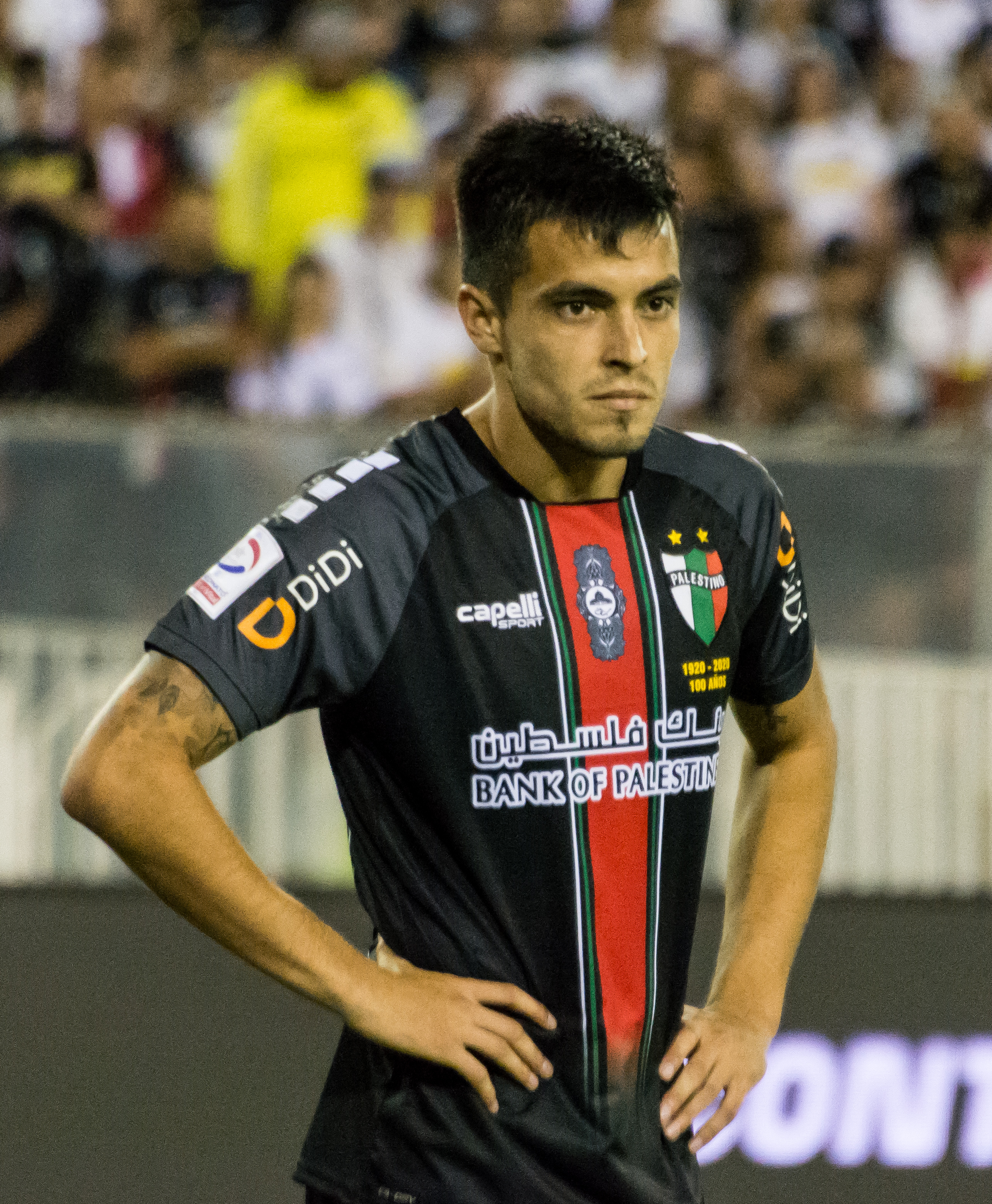
- Tarifeño with Palestino in 2020

Personal information
- Full name: Renato Nicolás Tarifeño Aranda
- Date of birth: 6 September 1996 (age 30)
- Place of birth: Coquimbo, Chile
- Height: 1.75 m (5 ft 9 in)
- Position: Forward

Team information
- Current team: Provincial Ovalle

Youth career
- Coquimbo Unido

Senior career*
Years	Team	Apps	(Gls)
2013–2016	Coquimbo Unido	57	(16)
2016–2018	Universidad de Concepción	25	(2)
2018	→ Audax Italiano (loan)	18	(0)
2019–2021	Palestino	26	(4)
2021	Coquimbo Unido	23	(3)
2022	Santiago Morning	20	(0)
2023	Unión Bellavista	1	(0)
2023–2025	Deportes Limache	42	(9)
2025	→ San Luis (loan)	9	(1)
2026–	Provincial Ovalle	0	(0)

International career
2014	Chile U20		
- * Club domestic league appearances and goals as of 30 January 2026

Renato Nicolás Tarifeño Aranda (born September 6, 1996) is a Chilean footballer who plays as a forward for Provincial Ovalle.

== Club career ==
In 2023, Tarifeño joined Unión Bellavista from Coquimbo for the Copa Chile, alongside former professional players such as Ángel Carreño, Eladio Herrera, Mario Aravena, Gustavo Fuentealba, Gary Tello, among others. In the second half of the same year, he joined Deportes Limache, winning the league title. In June 2025, was loaned out to San Luis de Quillota.

On 28 January 2026, Tarifeño joined Provincial Ovalle.

== International career ==
Tarifeño represented Chile U20 at the 2014 Torneo Cuatro Naciones Chile.

== Personal life ==
He is nicknamed Tari, a short form of his surname.

== Honours ==
Coquimbo Unido

- Primera B: 2014–C (Note: no promotion to Primera División)

Deportes Limache

- Segunda División Profesional: 2023
