= Daniel Navarrete (footballer) =

Chilean footballer

Personal information
- Full name: Daniel Alejandro Navarrete Candia
- Date of birth: 17 April 2001 (age 25)
- Place of birth: Santiago, Chile
- Height: 1.78 m (5 ft 10 in)
- Position: Right-back

Team information
- Current team: Real San Joaquín
- Number: 2

Youth career
- Universidad de Chile

Senior career*
Years	Team	Apps	(Gls)
2021–2025	Universidad de Chile	13	(0)
2024	→ Barnechea (loan)	3	(0)
2026–	Real San Joaquín	1	(0)
- * Club domestic league appearances and goals as of 23 March 2026

Daniel Alejandro Navarrete Candia (born 17 April 2001) is a Chilean footballer who plays as a right-back for Real San Joaquín.

== Club career ==
Born in Santiago de Chile, Navarrete is a product of Universidad de Chile. He made his professional debut in the 2–0 away loss against San Lorenzo de Almagro for the Copa Libertadores on 18 March 2021.

In February 2024, Navarrete was loaned out to Barnechea and suffered an ACL injury few weeks later. Back to Universidad de Chile for the 2025 season, he had no chances to play under Gustavo Álvarez.

In December 2025, Navarrete ended his contract with Universidad de Chile after about 13 years. On 28 February 2026, Navarrete joined Real San Joaquín.
