= Mauricio Maslovski =

Argentine footballer

Personal information
- Full name: Álvaro Mauricio Maslovski
- Date of birth: 15 March 2000 (age 26)
- Place of birth: San Ignacio, Argentina
- Height: 1.87 m (6 ft 1 1/2 in)
- Position: Goalkeeper

Team information
- Current team: Santiago City
- Number: 1

Youth career
- 2004–2009: Escuela Mario Oilher
- 2009–2013: Academia Ernesto Duchini
- 2013–2020: Rosario Central

Senior career*
Years	Team	Apps	(Gls)
2021–2023	Rosario Central	0	(0)
2023	→ Ferro General Pico (loan)	29	(0)
2024–2025	Racing de Córdoba	16	(0)
2026–	Santiago City	1	(0)

International career
2015	Argentina U15		
2017	Argentina U17		
- * Club domestic league appearances and goals as of 10 April 2026

Álvaro Mauricio Maslovski (born 15 March 2000), known as Mauricio Maslovski, is an Argentine professional footballer who plays as a goalkeeper for Chilean club Santiago City.

== Club career ==
Born in San Ignacio, Misiones, Argentina, Maslovski was trained at Escuela de Fútbol Mario Oilher and Academia Ernesto Duchini before joining Rosario Central at the end of 2013. In 2023, he was loaned out to Ferro Carril Oeste de General Pico.

In 2024 and 2025, Maslovski played for Racing de Córdoba.

In February 2026, Maslovski moved abroad and signed with Chilean club Santiago City.

== International career ==
Maslovski represented Argentina at under-15 level in the 2015 South American Championship.

Later, he represented the under 17's in the 2017 South American Championship.

== Personal life ==
He is of Polish descent on his paternal side. His father also was a footballer.

Both his grandfather, Jorge Adán Maslovski, and his uncle, Jorge Jr., were goalkeepers. Jorge Adán played for Tigre de Santo Pipó and Jorge Jr. played for Crucero del Norte, Corpus, among others.
