= Carlos Gómez (footballer, born 1992) =

Chilean footballer

Personal information
- Full name: Carlos Alfredo Gómez Astudillo
- Date of birth: 14 February 1992 (age 34)
- Place of birth: El Bosque, Santiago, Chile
- Height: 1.72 m (5 ft 8 in)
- Position: Defensive midfielder

Youth career
- 2002–2010: Cobreloa

Senior career*
Years	Team	Apps	(Gls)
2010–2016	Cobreloa	71	(1)
2014–2015	→ Santiago Morning (loan)	33	(0)
2016–2017	Unión Española	10	(1)
2017	Deportes Iquique	6	(0)
2018–2021	Santiago Morning	66	(1)
2019	→ Bolívar (loan)	19	(0)
2022	Destroyer's	–	(–)
2023	Fernández Vial	23	(0)
2024–2025	San Antonio Unido	17	(0)
- * Club domestic league appearances and goals as of 26 May 2026

Carlos Alfredo Gómez Astudillo (born 14 February 1992) is a Chilean professional footballer who plays as a defensive midfielder.

== Career ==
Born in Santiago, Gómez joined Cobreloa youth system at the age of 10 in his city of birth and moved to Calama in 2009, making his professional debut in a Chilean Primera División match against Santiago Morning on 31 October 2010, by replacing Alejandro Kruchowski.

After playing for Cobreloa until the first half 2016 in the Primera B, he played for Unión Española in the 2016–17 Primera División season. In the second half of 2017, he played for Deportes Iquique in the same division.

In 2018, he returned to Santiago Morning after having played for them in the 2014–15 Primera B season. In 2019 he played on loan at Bolívar, winning the 2019 Apertura.

In March 2022 he was going to join Argentine club Ferro General Pico, but he rejected the option by signing with Bolivian club Destroyer's to play in the Copa Simón Bolívar.

Back in Chile, he joined Fernández Vial in the Segunda División Profesional de Chile. He switched to San Antonio Unido in 2024.

== Personal life ==
Due to his haircut, he has gotten many nicknames, but he prefers Puyol del Desierto (Puyol from Desert) for being related to football because of his resemblance to Spanish former footballer Carles Puyol.

== Honours ==
Bolívar

- Bolivian Primera División: 2019 Apertura
