= Bryan Figueroa =

Chilean footballer (born 1999)

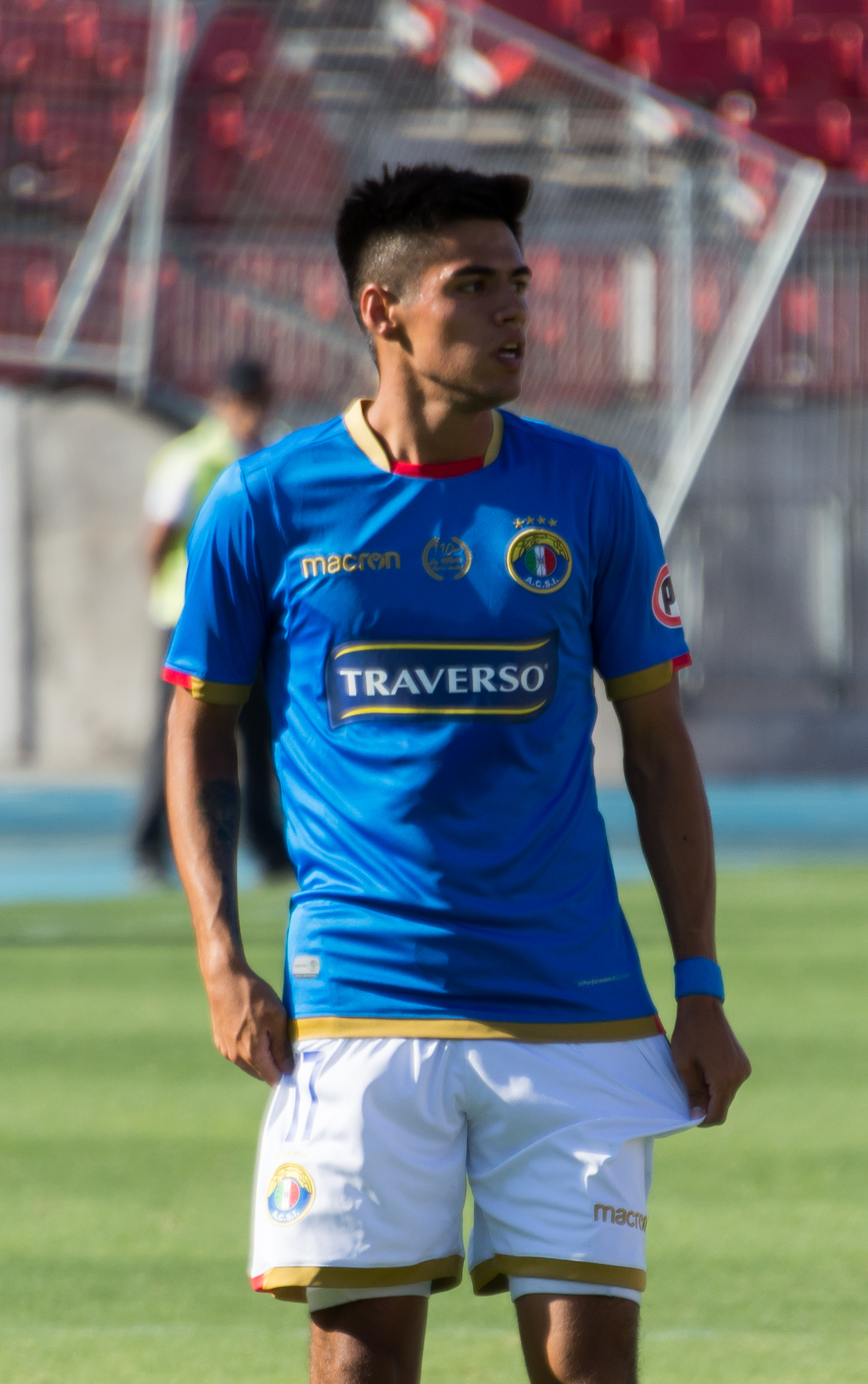
- Figueroa with Audax Italiano in 2020

Personal information
- Full name: Bryan Jesús Figueroa De La Hoz
- Date of birth: 21 June 1999 (age 27)
- Place of birth: La Granja, Santiago, Chile
- Height: 1.82 m (6 ft 0 in)
- Position: Midfielder

Team information
- Current team: Real San Joaquín
- Number: 14

Youth career
- Audax Italiano

Senior career*
Years	Team	Apps	(Gls)
2019–2023	Audax Italiano	40	(1)
2023	→ Deportes Rengo (loan)	14	(1)
2024	Deportes Rengo	1	(0)
2025	Deportes Linares	22	(0)
2026–	Real San Joaquín	0	(0)
- * Club domestic league appearances and goals as of 31 December 2025

Bryan Jesús Figueroa De La Hoz (born 21 June 1999) is a Chilean footballer who plays as a midfielder for Real San Joaquín.

== Career ==
Trained at Audax Italiano, Figueroa played on loan for Deportes Rengo in 2023.

The next years, Figueroa played for Deportes Rengo again, Deportes Linares and Real San Joaquín.
