= Diego Bravo =

Chilean footballer (born 1996)

Personal information
- Full name: Diego Antonio Bravo San Martín
- Date of birth: 22 November 1996 (age 29)
- Place of birth: Peñalolén, Santiago, Chile
- Height: 1.70 m (5 ft 7 in)
- Position: Left back

Team information
- Current team: Unión San Felipe

Youth career
- 2010–2015: Universidad Católica

Senior career*
Years	Team	Apps	(Gls)
2015–2017	Universidad Católica	0	(0)
2015–2016	→ Unión La Calera (loan)	8	(0)
2016	→ San Luis (loan)	11	(0)
2017	Deportes Copiapó	1	(0)
2018	Rangers	0	(0)
2018–2019	Provincial Ovalle	–	(–)
2020	Celaya	0	(0)
2020–2021	Provincial Ovalle	–	(–)
2021	Iberia	22	(2)
2022	San Luis	22	(0)
2023	Santiago Morning	13	(0)
2024	Barnechea	27	(0)
2025	San Marcos	8	(0)
2026–	Unión San Felipe	0	(0)
- * Club domestic league appearances and goals as of 19 January 2026

Diego Antonio Bravo San Martín (born 22 November 1996) is a Chilean footballer who plays as left-back for Unión San Felipe.

== Club career ==
Diego did all lower in Universidad Católica but his debut was in Unión La Calera.

After playing for Provincial Ovalle, he moved to Mexico in 2020 and joined Celaya in the Liga de Expansión.

In 2023, he joined Santiago Morning from San Luis de Quillota. The next season, he switched to Barnechea.

On 27 December 2025, Bravo signed with Unión San Felipe.
