= Óscar Lee-Chong =

Chilean-Chinese footballer (born 1965)

Personal information
- Full name: Óscar Rigoberto Lee-Chong Pinilla
- Date of birth: 20 March 1965 (age 61)
- Place of birth: Santiago, Chile
- Height: 1.71 m (5 ft 7 in)
- Position: Midfielder

Youth career
- 1979–1980: Universidad de Chile
- 1981–1983: Universidad Católica

Senior career*
| Years | Team | Apps | (Gls) |
| 1983–1984 | Universidad Católica | 0 | (0) |
| 1985 | Súper Lo Miranda | | |
| 1985 | Quintero Unido | | |
| 1986–1988 | Coquimbo Unido | | |
| 1989–1990 | Naval de Talcahuano | 48 | (4) |
| 1991 | Deportes Concepción | 22 | (0) |
| 1992 | Antofagasta | 26 | (2) |
| 1993 | Coquimbo Unido | 23 | (1) |
| 1994 | Deportes Temuco | 20 | (1) |
| 1995–1998 | Palestino | 97 | (7) |
| 1999 | Rangers de Talca | 26 | (1) |

International career
| 1997 | Chile | 1 | (0) |
- * Club domestic league appearances and goals

Óscar Rigoberto Lee-Chong Pinilla (born 20 March 1965) is a Chilean former international footballer who played as a midfielder.

== Club career ==
Lee-Chong played for a number of clubs in Chile, across the top three divisions. In 1991, he turned down a move to Colo-Colo.

== International career ==
Lee-Chong made one appearance in the Chile national team, playing the last few minutes when coming on as a substitute for Iván Zamorano in a 1–1 draw with Bolivia during the 1998 FIFA World Cup qualifications.

== Personal life ==
Lee-Chong's father, Chong Lee Lam (known in Chile as Benito Lee Chong Lam), fled his native China to avoid the rising tensions between China and Japan, as well as the Chinese Civil War, arriving in Chile in 1928. He went on to run a butchers shop in Santiago, and had six children, including Óscar, as well as Luis, who also went on to play football.

His son, Felipe, and nephew, Jaime Carreño, are also professional footballers.

Following his retirement, Lee-Chong went on to work as a chef in Pucón, and has his own restaurant - La Revancha del Chino Lee Chong.

== Career statistics ==
=== International ===
| National team | Year | Apps | Goals |
|---|---|---|---|
| Chile | 1997 | 1 | 0 |
| Total | | 1 | 0 |
