= Gary Tello =

Chilean footballer (born 1993)

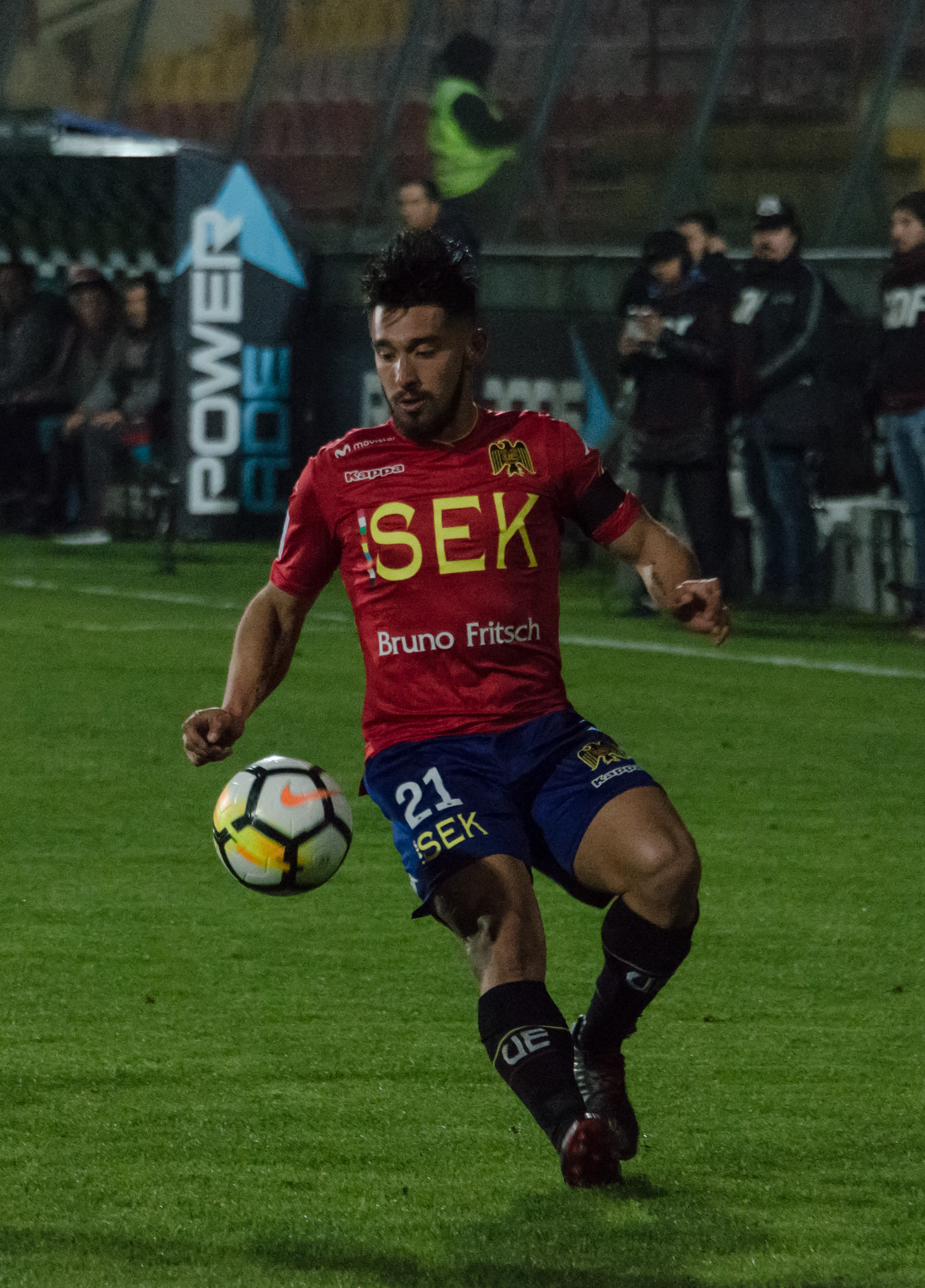
- Tello with Unión Española in 2018.

Personal information
- Full name: Gary Felipe Tello Mery
- Date of birth: 11 April 1993 (age 33)
- Place of birth: La Serena, Chile
- Height: 1.66 m (5 ft 5 in)
- Position: Winger

Youth career
- 2006–2010: Deportes La Serena

Senior career*
Years	Team	Apps	(Gls)
2010–2014	Deportes La Serena	57	(7)
2013	→ Deportes Melipilla (loan)	19	(10)
2015–2016	Magallanes	24	(1)
2016–2017	Curicó Unido	42	(6)
2018–2019	Unión Española	39	(6)
2020–2022	Deportes Antofagasta	30	(2)
2021	→ Rangers (loan)	20	(1)
2023	Unión Bellavista	1	(0)
2023–2025	Deportes Concepción	20	(0)
2024	→ San Luis (loan)	8	(0)
2025	Concepción Norte	–	(–)
2025	Deportivo ENAP	–	(–)
- * Club domestic league appearances and goals as of 27 December 2025

Gary Felipe Tello Mery (born 11 April 1993) is a Chilean footballer who plays as a winger.

== Career ==
In 2023, Tello joined Unión Bellavista from Coquimbo for the Copa Chile, alongside former professional players such as Ángel Carreño, Eladio Herrera, Mario Aravena, Renato Tarifeño, Gustavo Fuentealba, among others. In July of the same year, he joined Deportes Concepción. After a stint on loan with San Luis de Quillota in the second half of 2024, he left Deportes Concepción in July 2025.

After leaving Deportes Concepción, Tello continued playing football in the Biobío Region for clubs such as Concepción Norte and Deportivo ENAP.
