= Ignacio Ayala =

Chilean footballer (born 1997)

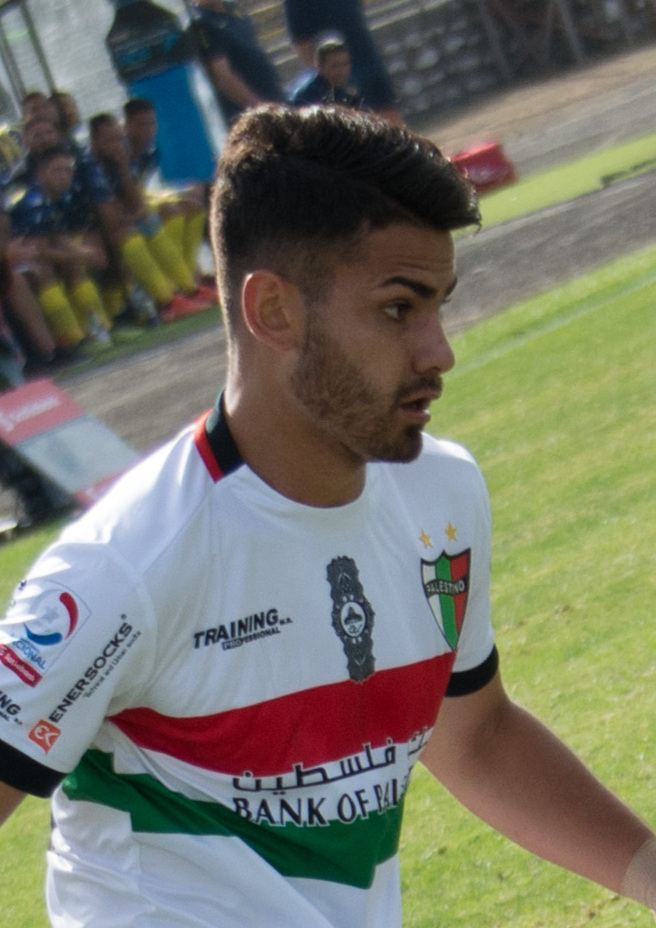
- Ignacio Ayala in 2018.

Personal information
- Full name: Ignacio Nicolás Ayala Rojas
- Date of birth: 29 November 1997 (age 28)
- Place of birth: San Miguel, Santiago, Chile
- Position: Defender

Youth career
- Palestino

Senior career*
Years	Team	Apps	(Gls)
2015–2021	Palestino	20	(0)
2020–2021	→ Deportes Recoleta (loan)	16	(1)
2021	Barnechea	7	(0)
2022	Rodelindo Román	4	(0)
- * Club domestic league appearances and goals as of 21 September 2020

Ignacio Nicolás Ayala Rojas (born 29 November 1997) is a Chilean footballer. He has played for Rodelindo Román, San Marcos de Arica, A.C. Barnechea, and Club Deportivo Palestino. He played for San Marcos de Arica in the 2025 Copa Chile.
