= Pablo Cárdenas =

Chilean footballer (born 2000)

Personal information
- Full name: Pablo Ignacio Cárdenas Baeza
- Date of birth: 10 February 2000 (age 26)
- Place of birth: Providencia, Santiago, Chile
- Height: 1.77 m (5 ft 10 in)
- Position: Right-back

Team information
- Current team: Santiago City

Youth career
- Colo-Colo
- Cobresal

Senior career*
Years	Team	Apps	(Gls)
2018–2023	Cobresal	87	(3)
2024–2025	Cusco FC	26	(1)
2025	Comerciantes Unidos	11	(2)
2026–	Santiago City	0	(0)
- * Club domestic league appearances and goals as of 30 December 2025

Pablo Ignacio Cárdenas Baeza (born 10 February 2000) is a Chilean footballer who plays as a defender for Santiago City.

== Career ==
As a child, Cárdenas was with the Colo-Colo youth team, before joining Cobresal, ending his contract with them in December 2023.

In 2024, Cárdenas moved to Peru and joined Cusco FC.

Back to Chile, Cárdenas joined Santiago City in February 2026.

== Personal life ==
His father is Peruvian, being eligible to represent both Chile and Peru.
