= Juan Luvera =

Argentine football manager

Personal information
- Full name: Juan José Luvera
- Date of birth: 24 November 1980 (age 45)
- Place of birth: Rosario, Argentina

Managerial career
- Years: Team
- 2016: Universitario (youth)
- 2017: Juan Aurich (youth)
- 2017: Deportivo Coopsol
- 2017–2021: Huachipato (youth)
- 2021: Huachipato (interim)
- 2021: Huachipato
- 2022: Universidad San Martín
- 2022: Rangers
- 2023: Deportes La Serena
- 2024: Rangers
- 2025: Santiago City
- 2025: San Luis
- 2026: Provincial Ovalle
- 2026: Unión San Felipe

Juan José Luvera (born 24 November 1980) is an Argentine football manager.

== Career ==
Born in Rosario, Santa Fe, Luvera began his career in 2001 with lowly local sides. In 2016, he moved to Peru and joined Universitario's youth setup.

On 31 May 2017, Luvera was named manager of Peruvian Segunda División side Deportivo Coopsol. He was relieved of his duties in August, and joined Chilean side Huachipato in September, to work in the club's youth categories.

On 6 January 2021, Luvera was named interim manager of Huachipato, replacing sacked Gustavo Florentín. On 26 February, he was definitely appointed manager for the 2021 campaign.

Luvera left Huachipato on a mutual consent on 17 October 2021, and was named in charge of Peruvian side Universidad San Martín the following 27 January. He left the latter on 5 April 2022, after just eight league matches.

In January 2025, Luvera assumed as manager of Santiago City in the Segunda División Profesional de Chile. He left them in March of the same year. On 4 July of the same year, he was appointed the manager of San Luis de Quillota.

On 15 April 2026, Luvera assumed as mamager of Provincial Ovalle. He left them on 26 May and switched to Unión San Felipe.
