= Estadio Municipal Doctor Olegario Henríquez Escalante =

Stadium in San Antonio, Chile

Estadio Doctor Olegario Henríquez Escalante
- Interactive map of Estadio Doctor Olegario Henríquez Escalante
- Full name: Estadio Municipal Doctor Olegario Henríquez Escalante
- Location: San Antonio, Chile
- Coordinates: 33°35′12″S 70°38′9″W
- Owner: Municipality of San Antonio
- Capacity: 5,000
- Surface: grass
- Field size: 105 x 68 m

Tenant
- San Antonio Unido

Estadio Municipal Doctor Olegario Henríquez Escalante is a multi-use stadium in San Antonio, Chile. It is used mostly for football matches and is the home stadium of San Antonio Unido. The stadium holds 5,000 spectators after their last renovation between 2018 and 2025. Previously the capacity was 2,024 people.
