= Fabián Núñez (footballer) =

Chilean footballer (born 1992)

Personal information
- Full name: Fabián Israel Núñez Cortés
- Date of birth: 25 June 1992 (age 34)
- Place of birth: Santiago, Chile
- Height: 1.71 m (5 ft 7 1/2 in)
- Position: Attacking midfielder

Team information
- Current team: Santiago City

Youth career
- Santiago Morning

Senior career*
Years	Team	Apps	(Gls)
2011–2018	Santiago Morning	194	(26)
2016–2017	→ Cobresal (loan)	18	(1)
2019–2021	Rangers	19	(0)
2021	Deportes Copiapó	29	(5)
2022	Deportes Puerto Montt	33	(7)
2023–2024	Deportes Temuco	47	(11)
2024–2025	Deportes Concepción	32	(1)
2026–	Santiago City	0	(0)
- * Club domestic league appearances and goals as of 9 February 2026

Fabián Israel Núñez Cortés (born 25 June 1992) is a Chilean footballer who plays as an attacking midfielder for Santiago City.

== Career ==
In June 2024, Núñez signed with Deportes Concepción, winning the 2024 Segunda División Profesional. He left them at the end of 2025.

In 2026, Núñez joined Santiago City.

== Personal life ==
Núñez is nicknamed Zombie.

== Honours ==
Deportes Concepción

- Segunda División Profesional de Chile: 2024
