= Darko Fiamengo =

Chilean footballer

Personal information
- Full name: Darko Nicolás Fiamengo Pinto
- Date of birth: 13 February 2003 (age 23)
- Place of birth: Copiapó, Chile
- Height: 1.83 m (6 ft 0 in)
- Position: Centre-back

Youth career
- Colo-Colo

Senior career*
Years	Team	Apps	(Gls)
2022–2026	Colo-Colo	0	(0)
2023	→ Curicó Unido (loan)	6	(0)
2024	→ Unión La Calera (loan)	4	(0)
2025	→ San Antonio Unido (loan)	19	(0)
2026	Real Kashmir	0	(0)

International career
2022–2023	Chile U20	6	(0)
- * Club domestic league appearances and goals as of 3 February 2026

Darko Nicolás Fiamengo Pinto (born 13 February 2003) is a Chilean footballer who plays as a centre-back.

== Club career ==
Born in Copiapó, Chile, Fiamengo is a product of Colo-Colo and signed his first professional contract in April 2022. In July 2023, he was loaned out to Curicó Unido in the Chilean Primera División and made his professional debut in the 1–1 away draw against Deportes Copiapó on 6 August 2023. The next year, he switched to Unión La Calera. In 2025, he was loaned out to San Antonio Unido.

Back to Colo-Colo for the 2026 season, Fiamengo ended his contract and announced he would play in European football.

After some failed signings with Swedish clubs, Fiamengo signed with Indian club Real Kashmir for three months until July 2026. Later, he moved to Croatia to get European passport.

== International career ==
During 2022, Fiamengo represented the Chile U20 team under Patricio Ormazábal in the friendly tournament Costa Cálida Supercup, the South American Games and a friendly against Uruguay on 16 December.

The next year, Fiamengo was part of the Chile squad in the 2023 South American U20 Championship.
