= Jaime Soto (footballer) =

Chilean footballer (born 1992)

Personal information
- Full name: Jaime José Soto Kaempfer
- Date of birth: 20 April 1992 (age 34)
- Place of birth: Valdivia, Chile
- Height: 1.71 m (5 ft 7 in)
- Position: Right-back

Team information
- Current team: Provincial Ovalle

Senior career*
Years	Team	Apps	(Gls)
2012–2013	Unión Temuco	24	(0)
2013–2018	Deportes Temuco	88	(2)
2013–2014	→ Deportes Valdivia (loan)	20	(2)
2019	Coquimbo Unido	8	(1)
2020–2021	Cobreloa	48	(1)
2023	Unión Wanderers	–	(–)
2024	Deportes Rengo	22	(2)
2026–	Provincial Ovalle	0	(0)
- * Club domestic league appearances and goals as of 13 March 2024

Jaime José Soto Kaempfer (born 20 April 1992) is a Chilean footballer who plays as a right-back for Provincial Ovalle in the Segunda División Profesional de Chile.

== Career ==
Born in Valdivia, Chile, Soto has played in the Chilean Primera División for Deportes Temuco and Coquimbo Unido.

In 2024, Soto joined Deportes Rengo in the Segunda División Profesional de Chile from Unión Wanderers General Lagos.

On 28 January 2026, Soto joined Provincial Ovalle.
