= Luis Cabrera (Chilean footballer) =

Chilean footballer (born 1994)

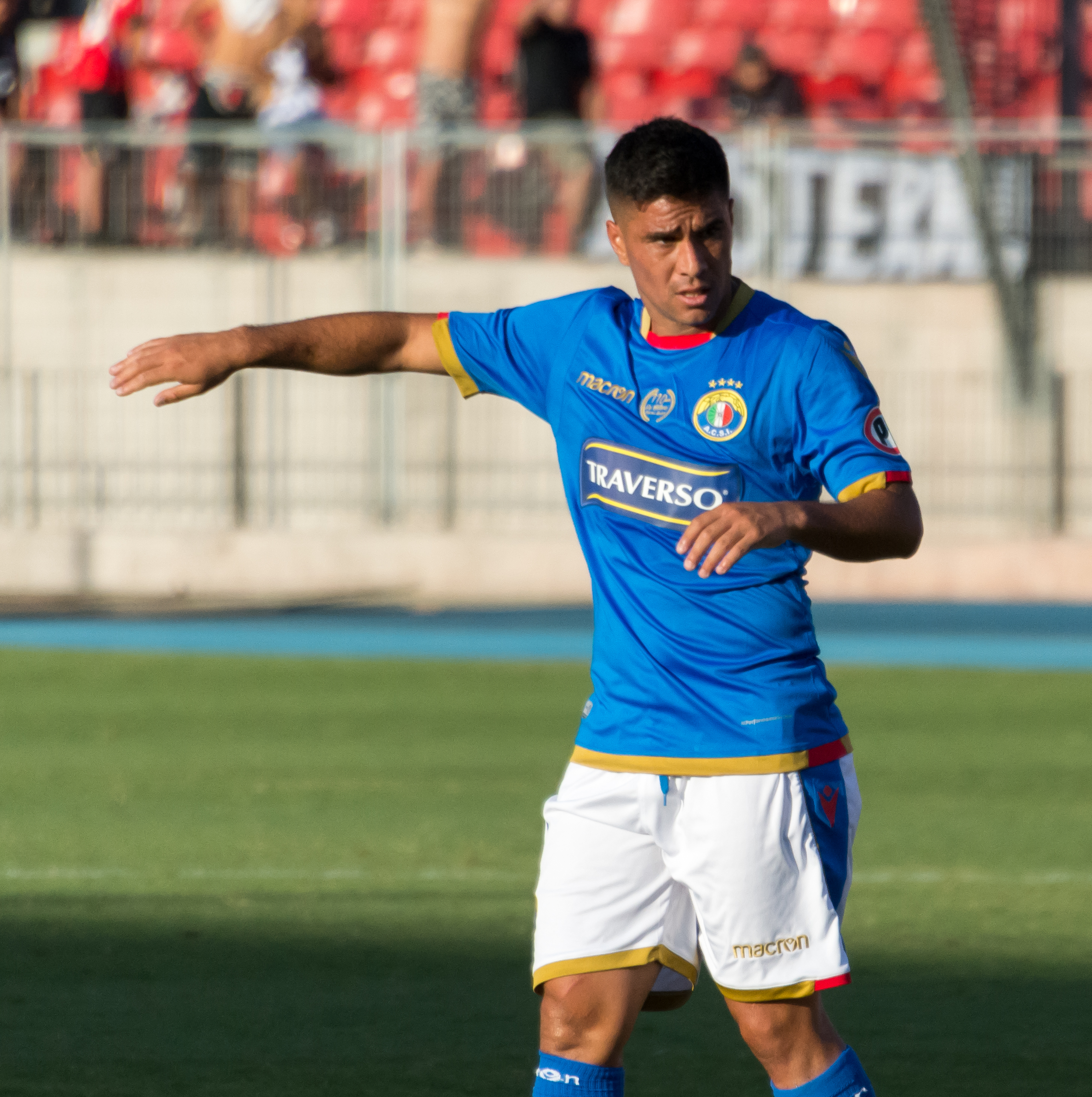
- Cabrera with Audax Italiano in 2020

Personal information
- Full name: Luis Alberto Cabrera Figueroa
- Date of birth: 7 January 1994 (age 32)
- Place of birth: Antofagasta, Chile
- Position: Midfielder

Team information
- Current team: Provincial Ovalle
- Number: 8

Youth career
- Deportes Antofagasta

Senior career*
Years	Team	Apps	(Gls)
2010–2017	Deportes Antofagasta	115	(5)
2018–2020	Audax Italiano	77	(0)
2022	Coquimbo Unido	18	(1)
2023	Deportes Copiapó	18	(0)
2024	Deportes Limache	28	(0)
2025	San Luis	16	(0)
2026–	Provincial Ovalle	0	(0)
- * Club domestic league appearances and goals as of 26 December 2024

Luis Alberto Cabrera Figueroa (born 7 January 1994) is a Chilean footballer who plays as a midfielder for Provincial Ovalle.

== Career ==
He signed with Deportes Copiapó for the 2023 season of the Chilean Primera División.

In 2024, Cabrera joined Deportes Limache in the Primera B de Chile. The next season, he switched to San Luis de Quillota.

On 28 January 2026, Cabrera joined Provincial Ovalle.
