= Matías Carrera =

Argentine footballer (born 1996)

Personal information
- Full name: Matías Ezequiel Carrera
- Date of birth: 22 December 1996 (age 29)
- Place of birth: Cipolletti, Argentina
- Height: 1.70 m (5 ft 7 in)
- Position: Right-back

Team information
- Current team: Deportivo Rincón

Youth career
- San Martín Cipolletti
- 2011–2015: Cipolletti

Senior career*
| Years | Team | Apps | (Gls) |
| 2015–2021 | Cipolletti | 99 | (3) |
| 2022–2023 | Deportes Iquique | 31 | (0) |
| 2024 | Cipolletti | 27 | (0) |
| 2025 | San Antonio Unido | 5 | (0) |
| 2026– | Deportivo Rincón | 0 | (0) |
- * Club domestic league appearances and goals as of 28 April 2025

Matías Ezequiel Carrera (born 22 December 1996) is an Argentine-Chilean footballer who plays as a right-back for Deportivo Rincón.

== Club career ==
Born in Cipolletti, Argentina, Carrera was with San Martín de Cipolletti before joining Club Cipolletti, at the age of fourteen. He made his professional debut in 2015 under Ricardo Pancaldo. A historical player of the club, he reached one hundred matches in total at the age of 24, being awarded for this on 3 September 2021.

In 2022, he moved to Chile and signed with Deportes Iquique. The next year, they got promotion to the Primera División after winning the promotion play-offs of the 2023 Primera B.

In 2024, Carrera returned to his country of birth and rejoined Cipolletti.

In 2025, Carrera returned to Chile and joined San Antonio Unido. The next year, he returned to Argentina with Deportivo Rincón.

== Personal life ==
Carrera holds dual Argentine-Chilean nationality due to his Chilean descent.
