= Mario Aravena =

Chilean footballer (born 1985)

Personal information
- Full name: Mario Antonio Aravena Bonilla
- Date of birth: 31 January 1985 (age 41)
- Place of birth: Santiago, Chile
- Height: 1.68 m (5 ft 6 in)
- Position: Attacking midfielder

Youth career
- 2002–2005: Coquimbo Unido

Senior career*
Years	Team	Apps	(Gls)
2004–2008	Coquimbo Unido	109	(16)
2008–2011	Unión Española	76	(22)
2011–2013	Universidad de Concepción	25	(1)
2014	Deportes Concepción	11	(2)
2020–2023	Unión Bellavista	–	(–)
Total		221	(41)
- * Club domestic league appearances and goals

Mario Antonio Aravena Bonilla (born 31 January 1985) is a Chilean former footballer who played as an attacking midfielder.

== Career ==
A product of Coquimbo Unido youth system, Aravena played for them, Unión Española, Universidad de Concepción and Deportes Concepción at professional level.

In 2023, as a member of Unión Bellavista from Coquimbo, he took part in the Copa Chile, alongside former professional players such as Ángel Carreño, Eladio Herrera, Gustavo Fuentealba, Renato Tarifeño, Gary Tello, among others.
