= Jonathan Orellana =

Chilean football manager and player

Personal information
- Full name: Jonathan Osvaldo Orellana Beis
- Date of birth: 3 March 1979 (age 47)
- Place of birth: Santiago, Chile
- Position: Midfielder

Youth career
- Colo-Colo
- Magallanes
- Cobreloa
- Unión Española

Senior career*
Years	Team	Apps	(Gls)
2000	Barnechea	–	(–)
2001–2004	Deportes Copiapó		
2005	Unión Española	10	(1)
2006	Santiago Morning	1	(0)
2006	Unión La Calera	25	(4)
2007	Fernández Vial	2	(0)
2008	Deportes Copiapó		

Managerial career
- 2013–2015: San Luis (youth)
- 2015: San Luis (assistant)
- 2016–2018: Everton (youth)
- 2019: Deportes Limache
- 2020–2021: Unión La Calera (assistant)
- 2021: Santiago Wanderers (assistant)
- 2021: Unión San Felipe (assistant)
- 2022: Unión San Felipe
- 2023: Fernández Vial
- 2024: Unión San Felipe
- 2024: Concón National
- 2025: Rancho Santana
- 2026: Provincial Ovalle
- * Club domestic league appearances and goals

Jonathan Osvaldo Orellana Beis (born 3 March 1979) is a Chilean football manager and former player who played as a midfielder.

== Playing career ==
A football midfielder, Orellana developed his career from 1999 to 2008 and played for Barnechea, Deportes Copiapó, Unión Española, Santiago Morning, Unión La Calera and Fernández Vial. With Unión Española, he won the 2005 Torneo Apertura.

== Coaching career ==
Orellana started his career with San Luis de Quillota as coach for the youth ranks and assistant coach. In 2017 and 2018, he did internships with Mexican club Pachuca and Argentine club Talleres, respectively. After coaching the Everton de Viña del Mar youth teams from 2016 to 2018, winning five national titles, he assumed as manager of Deportes Limache in 2019.

After serving as assistant coach for Unión La Calera, Santiago Wanderers and Unión San Felipe, Orellana took in charge the last one in December 2021.

The next years, Orellana led Fernández Vial, Unión San Felipe again and Concón National before moving abroad and taking in charge Nicaraguan club Rancho Santana in January 2025.

Back to Chile, Orellana assumed as manager of Provincial Ovalle in December 2025.
