= Guillermo Orellana =

Chilean footballer (born 1986)

Personal information
- Full name: Guillermo Enrique Orellana Riquelme
- Date of birth: 29 June 1986 (age 40)
- Place of birth: Santiago, Chile
- Height: 1.81 m (5 ft 11 in)
- Position: Goalkeeper

Team information
- Current team: Provincial Ovalle

Youth career
- Cobresal

Senior career*
| Years | Team | Apps | (Gls) |
| 2006–2007 | Cobresal | 4 | (0) |
| 2008–2009 | Trasandino | 38 | (0) |
| 2010 | Deportes Puerto Montt | 2 | (0) |
| 2011–2014 | Universidad de Concepción | 14 | (0) |
| 2015–2016 | Coquimbo Unido | 6 | (0) |
| 2016–2018 | Deportes Copiapó | 52 | (0) |
| 2019 | Deportes Temuco | 0 | (0) |
| 2020–2023 | Coquimbo Unido | 20 | (0) |
| 2024– | Provincial Ovalle | 0 | (0) |
- * Club domestic league appearances and goals as of 26 February 2024

Guillermo Enrique Orellana Riquelme (born 29 July 1986) is a Chilean professional footballer who plays as a goalkeeper for Provincial Ovalle in the Segunda División Profesional de Chile.

== Career ==
In 2024, he joined Provincial Ovalle in the Segunda División Profesional de Chile.

== Honours ==
Universidad de Concepción

- Primera B (1): 2013–Transición
- Copa Chile (1): 2014–15

Coquimbo Unido

- Primera B (1): 2021
