= Bastián Solano =

Chilean footballer (born 1999)

Personal information
- Full name: Bastián Felipe Solano Molina
- Date of birth: 16 June 1999 (age 27)
- Place of birth: Melipilla, Chile
- Height: 1.83 m (6 ft 0 in)
- Position: Centre-back

Team information
- Current team: Provincial Ovalle
- Number: 16

Youth career
- –2015: Universidad de Chile
- 2016–2017: Deportes Melipilla
- 2017–2019: Huachipato

Senior career*
| Years | Team | Apps | (Gls) |
| 2018–2020 | Huachipato | 1 | (0) |
| 2020 | → Deportes Melipilla (loan) | 4 | (0) |
| 2021–2022 | Fernández Vial | 38 | (3) |
| 2023 | Trasandino | 22 | (0) |
| 2024 | Fernández Vial | 16 | (0) |
| 2025– | Provincial Ovalle | 5 | (0) |
- * Club domestic league appearances and goals as of 5 May 2025

Bastián Felipe Solano Molina (born 16 June 1999) is a Chilean footballer who plays as a centre-back for Provincial Ovalle.

== Career ==
In 2024, Solano rejoined Fernández Vial from Trasandino after playing for them in 2021–22.
