= Luckas Carreño =

Chilean footballer (born 2003)

Personal information
- Full name: Luckas Benjhamín Carreño Oñate
- Date of birth: 4 July 2003 (age 23)
- Place of birth: Maipú, Santiago, Chile
- Height: 1.76 m (5 ft 9 in)
- Position: Midfielder

Team information
- Current team: Provincial Ovalle
- Number: 27

Youth career
- Palestino
- Colo-Colo
- Magallanes
- Oriente Petrolero
- 2019–2021: Deportes La Serena

Senior career*
Years	Team	Apps	(Gls)
2021–2025	Deportes La Serena	57	(2)
2024	→ Audax Italiano (loan)	1	(0)
2026–	Provincial Ovalle	1	(0)

International career^{‡}
2021–	Chile U20	5	(0)
- * Club domestic league appearances and goals as of 5 April 2026 ‡ National team caps and goals as of 30 September 2022

Luckas Benjhamín Carreño Oñate (born 4 July 2003) is a Chilean professional footballer who plays as a midfielder for Provincial Ovalle.

== Club career ==
As a child, Carreño was with Palestino, Colo-Colo and Magallanes in Chile and with Oriente Petrolero in Bolivia, then he joined Deportes La Serena in 2019. He made his professional debut in a 2021 Copa Chile match against Deportes Colina on June 23, 2021, and scored his first goal in the match against Huachipato on March 20, 2022.

In 2024, he was loaned out to Audax Italiano.

In February 2026, Carreño joined Provincial Ovalle in the Segunda División Profesional de Chile.

== International career ==
Since 2021, Carreño has been frequently called up for Chile at under-20 level and took part in the tournament Copa Rául Coloma Rivas, playing a match against Paraguay U20. Also, he played in a friendly match against the same opponent in 2022. Next he made appearances in two friendly matches against Peru U20 in July 2022. In September 2022, he made an appearance in the Costa Cálida Supercup.

== Personal life ==
He is the son of Ángel Carreño, a former professional footballer who played for Colo-Colo and Deportes La Serena, among others clubs. As a curiosity, Luckas scored by first time against the same opponent in the same goal than his father.
