= Ángel Carreño =

Chilean footballer (born 1980)

Personal information
- Full name: Ángel Rodrigo Carreño Ballesteros
- Date of birth: 29 October 1980 (age 46)
- Place of birth: Santiago, Chile
- Height: 1.80 m (5 ft 11 in)
- Position: Central midfielder

Team information
- Current team: Unión Compañías (manager)

Youth career
- 1990–1993: Colo-Colo
- 1994–1998: Palestino

Senior career*
Years	Team	Apps	(Gls)
1999–2004	Palestino	87	(4)
2003	→ Deportes Puerto Montt (loan)	33	(4)
2004–2005	Colo-Colo	37	(2)
2005	Örebro	27	(7)
2006	Palestino	19	(1)
2007–2010	Deportes La Serena	105	(10)
2009	→ Ñublense (loan)	12	(0)
2010	→ Universidad Católica (loan)	10	(0)
2011–2014	Unión La Calera	88	(5)
2014–2015	Deportes La Serena	27	(2)
2023	Unión Bellavista	–	(–)
Total		445	(35)

Managerial career
- 2026–: Unión Compañías
- * Club domestic league appearances and goals

Ángel Rodrigo Carreño Ballesteros (born 29 October 1980) is a Chilean former footballer who played as a central midfielder.

== Career ==
Carreño was with Colo-Colo from the age of 10 to 13 before joining the Palestino youth ranks.

In 2023, he returned to play in an official championship by signing with Unión Bellavista from Coquimbo, Chile, for the 2023 Copa Chile, alongside former professional players such as Gustavo Fuentealba, Eladio Herrera, Mario Aravena, Renato Tarifeño, Gary Tello, among others.

== Personal life ==
He is the father of Luckas Carreño, a professional footballer who is a product of Deportes La Serena youth system. As a curiosity, Luckas scored by first time against the same opponent in the same goal than himself.

He is a renowned fan of metal music.

== Coaching career ==
In January 2026, Carreño assumed as manager of Unión Compañías in the Tercera B.
