= Kevin Hidalgo =

Chilean footballer (born 1995)

Personal information
- Full name: Kevin Bastián Staling Hidalgo Silva
- Date of birth: 29 July 1995 (age 31)
- Place of birth: Talcahuano, Chile
- Height: 1.77 m (5 ft 10 in)
- Position: Defender

Team information
- Current team: San Antonio Unido
- Number: 2

Senior career*
Years	Team	Apps	(Gls)
2014–2019	Huachipato	26	(1)
2019	→ Ñublense (loan)	7	(0)
2020–2021	Fernández Vial	21	(1)
2021	Deportes Iquique	28	(1)
2022–2023	Lautaro de Buin	42	(2)
2024–	San Antonio Unido	14	(0)
- * Club domestic league appearances and goals as of 31 July 2024

Kevin Bastián Staling Hidalgo Silva (born 29 July 1995) is a Chilean footballer who plays for San Antonio Unido in the Segunda División Profesional de Chile.

== Career ==
In 2024, Hidalgo joined San Antonio Unido.
