= Nicolás Brun =

Uruguayan footballer

Personal information
- Full name: Jorge Nicolás Brun Bentancur
- Date of birth: 2 August 1999 (age 27)
- Place of birth: Trinidad, Uruguay
- Height: 1.75 m (5 ft 9 in)
- Position: Winger

Team information
- Current team: Unión San Felipe
- Number: 21

Youth career
- Porongos
- 2015–2016: Defensor Sporting
- 2016–2017: Nacional
- 2018: Racing Montevideo

Senior career*
Years	Team	Apps	(Gls)
2018	Racing Montevideo	0	(0)
2019–2021	Albion	26	(1)
2022	Santamarina	2	(0)
2022	Uruguay Montevideo	12	(0)
2023–2024	Plaza Colonia	46	(2)
2025	Oriental	27	(6)
2026–	Unión San Felipe	1	(0)
- * Club domestic league appearances and goals as of 23 February 2026

Jorge Nicolás Brun Bentancur (born 2 August 1999), known as Nicolás Brun, is a Uruguayan professional footballer who plays as a winger for Chilean club Unión San Felipe.

== Career ==
Brun started his senior career with Racing Club de Montevideo in 2018. He spent the next three seasons with Albion until 2021.

In 2022, Brun moved to Argentina to play for Ramón Santamarina. He returned to his homeland with Uruguay Montevideo in the second half of the same year.

On 20 January 2023, Brun signed with Plaza Colonia in the Uruguayan Primera División. He continued with them in the 2024 Segunda División, winning the league title and returning to the top level. In 2025, he switched to Oriental.

In December 2025, Brun moved abroad again and joined Chilean club Unión San Felipe.
