= Andrés Díaz (Chilean footballer) =

Chilean footballer (born 1995)

Personal information
- Full name: Andrés Eduardo Díaz Durán
- Date of birth: 4 January 1995 (age 31)
- Place of birth: Santiago, Chile
- Height: 1.78 m (5 ft 10 in)
- Position: Central midfielder

Team information
- Current team: Santiago City
- Number: 6

Youth career
- 2005–2015: Universidad Católica

Senior career*
Years	Team	Apps	(Gls)
2015	Universidad Católica	0	(0)
2015–2018	Deportes Valdivia	79	(7)
2018	→ Palestino (loan)	2	(0)
2019–2020	Ñublense	28	(0)
2020–2022	Deportes Santa Cruz	49	(0)
2023	Deportes Rengo	25	(1)
2024	San Luis	28	(2)
2025–	Santiago City	6	(0)
- * Club domestic league appearances and goals as of 5 May 2025

Andrés Eduardo Díaz Durán (born 4 January 1995), is a Chilean footballer who currently plays as a central midfielder for Santiago City in the Segunda División Profesional de Chile.

== Club career ==
Andres did all lower in Universidad Católica but his debut was in Deportes Valdivia.

He signed with Deportes Rengo in the Segunda División Profesional de Chile for the 2023 season.
