= Jaime Carreño =

Chilean footballer (born 1997)

Personal information
- Full name: Jaime Matías Carreño Lee-Chong
- Date of birth: 3 March 1997 (age 29)
- Place of birth: Recoleta, Chile
- Height: 1.66 m (5 ft 5 in)
- Position: Midfielder

Team information
- Current team: Real San Joaquín
- Number: 22

Youth career
- 2008–2010: Santiago Morning
- 2010–2015: Universidad Católica

Senior career*
Years	Team	Apps	(Gls)
2015–2021	Universidad Católica	50	(3)
2017	→ Everton (loan)	14	(0)
2020	→ Oriente Petrolero (loan)	9	(1)
2020–2021	→ Universidad de Concepción (loan)	15	(0)
2021–2022	Deportes La Serena	23	(0)
2023	Deportes Iquique	18	(1)
2024	Santiago Morning	8	(0)
2025	Deportes Santa Cruz	23	(1)
2026–	Real San Joaquín	0	(0)

International career
2013	Chile U17	3	(0)
2017	Chile U20	1	(0)
- * Club domestic league appearances and goals as of 19 March 2026

Jaime Matías Carreño Lee-Chong (born 3 March 1997), is a Chilean footballer who plays as a midfielder for Real San Joaquín.

== Club career ==
Carreño made his debut at Universidad Católica for the first time against Santiago Wanderers in Valparaíso in 2015.

In the first half of 2016, Jaime was consolidated as a starter in the team, with great performances. On 23 April 2016 Jaime gave the victory to U.C. in the "university Clasico", scoring the 2–1. This was his first goal in professionalism.

In 2024, Carreño joined Santiago Morning from Deportes Iquique. The next season, he switched to Deportes Santa Cruz.

== International career ==
Carreño got his first call up to the senior Chile squad for a friendly against Paraguay in September 2015.

== Personal life ==
From his maternal line, Carreño is of Chinese descent and the nephew of the former Chile international footballer Óscar Lee-Chong and the cousin of the also footballer Felipe Lee-Chong, son of Óscar.

== Honors ==
Universidad Católica

- Primera División de Chile: 2016–C, 2016–A, 2018, 2019
- Supercopa de Chile: 2016, 2019
