= Eladio Herrera (footballer) =

Chilean footballer (born 1984)

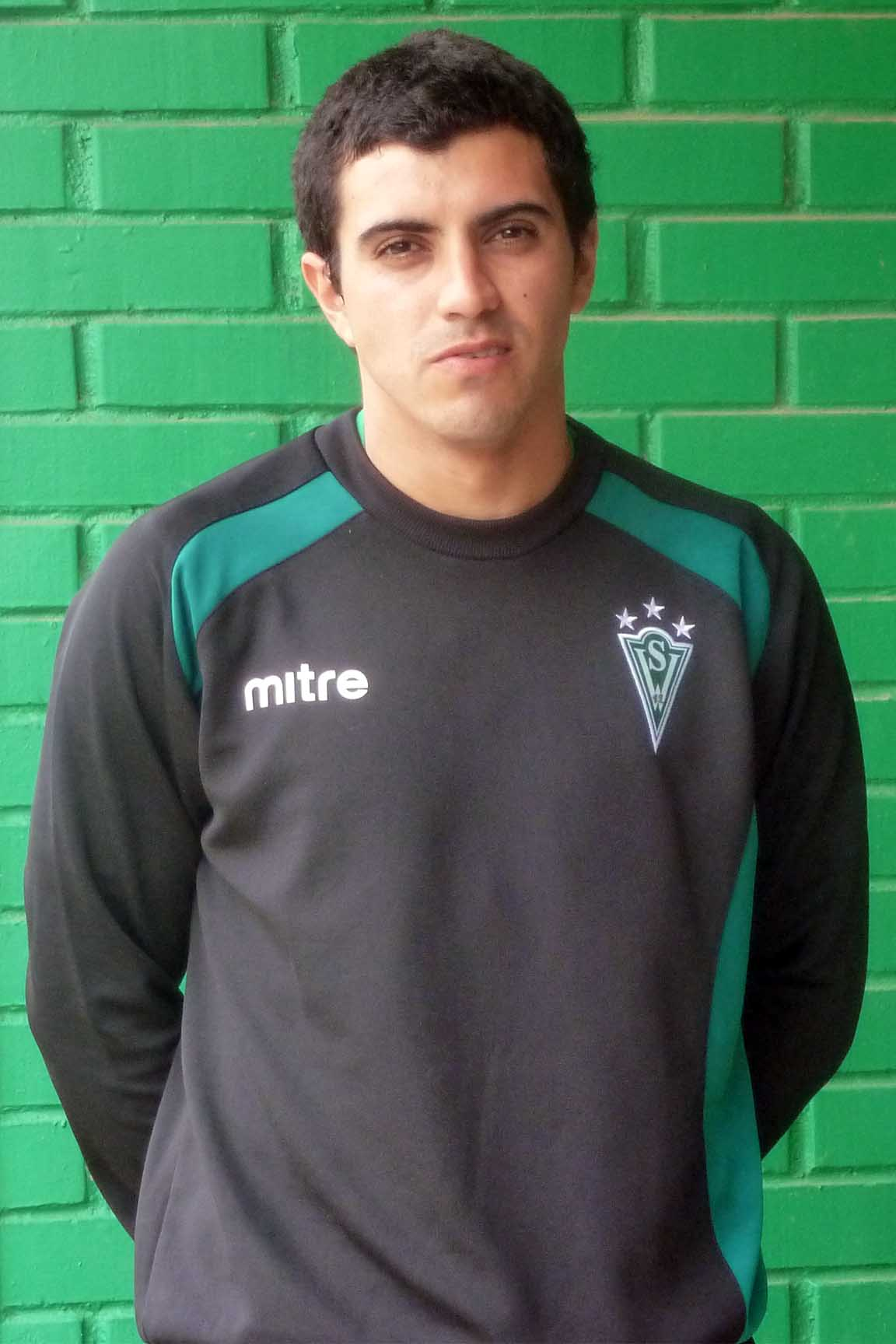
- Herrera with Santiago Wanderers in 2012

Personal information
- Full name: Eladio Enrique Herrera Segovia
- Date of birth: 13 July 1984 (age 42)
- Place of birth: La Serena, Chile
- Height: 1.78 m (5 ft 10 in)
- Position: Defender

Youth career
- Academia Santa Inés
- Coquimbo Unido

Senior career*
| Years | Team | Apps | (Gls) |
| 2002–2007 | Coquimbo Unido | 79 | (0) |
| 2008–2011 | Deportes Puerto Montt | 101 | (12) |
| 2012–2013 | Santiago Wanderers | 5 | (1) |
| 2013–2014 | Deportes Iquique | 0 | (0) |
| 2017–2025 | Unión Bellavista | – | (–) |
| Total | | 185 | (13) |
- * Club domestic league appearances and goals

Eladio Enrique Herrera Segovia (born 13 July 1984) is a Chilean former professional footballer who played as a defender.

== Career ==
A product of Coquimbo Unido youth system, Herrera made his professional debut in 2002, with whom reached the final of the 2005 Torneo Apertura. From 2008 to 2011 he played for Deportes Puerto Montt, becoming the top goalscorer as a defender for the club. In 2012 he joined Santiago Wanderers.

After his retirement, he has played for the amateur club Unión Bellavista of the Asociación San Juan from Coquimbo, performing as the team captain and coach and winning various regional and national championships. In the club, he has played along with another professional footballers such as Mario Aravena and Miguel Ángel Estay. In 2023, he took part in the Copa Chile, alongside former professional players such as Ángel Carreño, Gustavo Fuentealba, Mario Aravena, Renato Tarifeño, Gary Tello, among others.

== Honours ==
Deportes Iquique

- Copa Chile: 2013–14

Unión Bellavista

- Campeonato Regional Amateur: 2017, 2018, 2019
