= Ronald González (Chilean footballer) =

Chilean footballer (born 1990)

Personal information
- Full name: Ronald Damián González Tabilo
- Date of birth: 17 October 1990 (age 36)
- Place of birth: Antofagasta, Chile
- Height: 1.67 m (5 ft 6 in)
- Position: Winger

Team information
- Current team: Municipal Mejillones

Youth career
- 1999–2004: Minera Escondida
- 2004–2006: Deportes Antofagasta

Senior career*
Years	Team	Apps	(Gls)
2007–2017	Deportes Antofagasta	161	(20)
2017–2018	San Luis	21	(1)
2018–2021	Deportes Copiapó	55	(5)
2020–2021	→ Unión Española (loan)	12	(1)
2021	Cobreloa	23	(1)
2022	Deportes Copiapó	13	(0)
2023	Deportes Limache	14	(2)
2024	Provincial Ovalle	16	(0)
2025	Estudiantes Antofagasta	–	(–)
2026–	Municipal Mejillones	–	(–)

International career
2010	Chile	1	(0)
- * Club domestic league appearances and goals as of 17 March 2026

Ronald Damián González Tabilo (born 17 October 1990) is a Chilean footballer who plays as a winger for Municipal Mejillones.

== Career ==
For the 2023 season, González signed with Deportes Limache, winning the league title. The next season, he signed with Provincial Ovalle.

González officially retired in 2025. However, he continued playing football with Club Deportivo Estudiantes from Antofagasta during 2025 and the next year he joined Municipal Mejillones in the Tercera B.

== Honours ==
Deportes Antofagasta

- Primera B: 2011 Apertura, 2011 season

Deportes Limache

- Segunda División Profesional: 2023
