= Rodolfo Madrid =

Chilean footballer and manager (born 1980)

Personal information
- Full name: Rodolfo Alejandro Madrid González
- Date of birth: 14 May 1980 (age 46)
- Place of birth: San Vicente de Tagua Tagua, Chile
- Height: 1.70 m (5 ft 7 in)
- Position: Midfielder

Team information
- Current team: Rodelindo Román (manager)

Youth career
- 1993–1999: Colo-Colo

Senior career*
Years	Team	Apps	(Gls)
2000–2005	Colo-Colo	135	(7)
2000	→ Deportes Antofagasta (loan)		
2001	→ Deportes Temuco (loan)		
2006	Huachipato	35	(4)
2007–2008	Palestino	69	(5)
2009–2012	Unión Española	85	(2)
2013–2014	Deportes Temuco	23	(0)

Managerial career
- 2015–2017: Colo-Colo B
- 2018–: Rodelindo Román
- * Club domestic league appearances and goals as of 15 May 2014

Rodolfo Alejandro Madrid González (Spanish pronunciation: [roˈðolfo maˈðɾið], born 14 May 1980), is a Chilean former footballer and current manager of Rodelindo Román.

He has coached Club Rodelindo Román since 2018.

== Honours ==
=== As player ===
==== Club ====
Deportes Temuco

- Primera B (1): 2001

Colo-Colo

- Primera División (1): 2002 Clausura
