= Jorge Araya (footballer, born 1996) =

Chilean footballer

Personal information
- Full name: Jorge Matías Araya Pozo
- Date of birth: 25 March 1996 (age 30)
- Place of birth: Santiago, Chile
- Height: 1.77 m (5 ft 9 1/2 in)
- Position: Midfielder

Youth career
- 2004–2015: Colo-Colo

Senior career*
Years	Team	Apps	(Gls)
2012–2014	Colo-Colo B	3	(0)
2014–2021	Colo-Colo	20	(0)
2019–2021	→ Palestino (loan)	23	(0)
2022	Deportes Melipilla	11	(0)
2023	Trasandino	11	(0)
2023	Cobreloa	1	(0)
2024	Provincial Ovalle	11	(1)
2025	Tallahassee (seven-a-side)	–	(–)
2026-	Fc Kanks	1	(0)

International career^{‡}
2013	Chile U17	4	(0)
2014	Chile U20		
- * Club domestic league appearances and goals as of 12 February 2024 ‡ National team caps and goals as of 10 April 2013

Jorge Matías Araya Pozo (born 25 March 1996) is a Chilean footballer who plays as a midfielder.

== Club career ==
Product from Chilean giants Colo-Colo, Araya joined the club's youth ranks aged 8. Two seasons later, in 2016, he was considered by coach José Luis Sierra and fully debuted in a 0–0 Copa Libertadores group stage draw with Atlético Mineiro as home, previously playing some minutes in the derby against Universidad Católica, won 3–0 by Colo-Colo.

After being loaned to Palestino from 2019 to 2021, in 2022 he left Colo-Colo and joined Deportes Melipilla in the Primera B de Chile.

In 2023, he signed with Cobreloa from Trasandino de Los Andes. The next season, he switched to Provincial Ovalle in the Segunda División Profesional de Chile.

In 2025, Araya moved to the United States and played for seven-a-side football club Tallahassee alongside his former fellow in Colo-Colo, Daniel Malhue. They won the Premium Cup in Atlanta.

== International career ==
Araya represented Chile U20 at the 2014 Aspire Four Nations International Tournament in Qatar.

== Honours ==
Colo-Colo

- Primera División (2): 2015–A, 2017
- Copa Chile (1): 2016
- Supercopa de Chile (2): 2017, 2018

Tallahassee

- Premium Cup: 2025
