= 1971 Campeonato Nacional Primera División =

Campeonato Nacional 1971
- Dates: 10 April 1971 – 22 December 1971
- Champions: Unión San Felipe (1st title)
- Relegated: Audax Italiano
- 1972 Copa Libertadores: Unión San Felipe; Universidad de Chile
- Matches: 307
- Goals: 853 (2.78 per match)
- Top goalscorer: Eladio Zárate (25 goals)
- Biggest home win: Magallanes 6–0 Antofagasta Portuario (18 April)
- Highest attendance: 67,456 Universidad de Chile 0–0 Colo-Colo (26 September)
- Total attendance: 3,112,958
- Average attendance: 10,140

The 1971 Campeonato Nacional was Primera División de Chile’s 39th season since its foundation in 1933. Unión San Felipe was the tournament's champion, winning its first ever league title at top-level. By doing this, San Felipe became the only Chilean team to win the second division one year, and the first division tournament the next year.

== Standings ==
Pos	Team	Pld	W	D	L	GF	GA	GD	Pts	Qualification
1	Unión San Felipe	34	18	10	6	61	40	+21	46	Champions & Qualified to the 1972 Copa Libertadores
2	Universidad de Chile	34	17	10	7	73	42	+31	44	Qualified to the 1972 Copa Libertadores
3	Unión Española	34	14	14	6	52	40	+12	42	
4	Colo-Colo	34	16	9	9	62	42	+20	41	
5	Deportes Concepción	34	15	7	12	40	41	−1	37	
6	Unión La Calera	34	12	12	10	51	47	+4	36	
7	Santiago Wanderers	34	12	10	12	43	47	−4	34	
8	Deportes La Serena	34	11	12	11	45	50	−5	34	
9	Rangers	34	11	10	13	40	43	−3	32	
10	Antofagasta Portuario	34	10	12	12	42	51	−9	32	
11	O'Higgins	34	12	8	14	36	47	−11	32	
12	Huachipato	34	10	11	13	43	45	−2	31	
13	Universidad Católica	34	13	4	17	49	51	−2	30	
14	Magallanes	34	13	4	17	50	55	−5	30	
15	Green Cross Temuco	34	10	10	14	45	51	−6	30	
16	Everton	34	10	9	15	43	52	−9	29	
17	Lota Schwager	34	9	8	17	42	52	−10	26	Qualified for the Relegation Play-off
18	Audax Italiano	34	7	12	15	33	54	−21	26	Qualified for the Relegation Play-off

1971 Campeonato Nacional
champions
Unión San Felipe
1st title

== Results ==
Home \ Away	DAN	AUD	COL	DCO	EVE	GCT	HUA	DLS	LSC	MAG	OHI	RAN	USF	ULC	UCA	UCH	UES	SWA
Antofagasta		1–1	2–0	0–0	3–1	3–1	0–2	0–0	3–2	1–2	1–1	0–0	0–0	2–4	0–3	0–0	4–1	2–0
Audax	1–2		0–3	1–1	0–1	2–1	1–1	2–1	0–0	1–0	3–1	0–0	1–6	2–2	1–2	0–1	0–0	0–0
Colo-Colo	1–2	1–1		4–1	2–0	2–2	1–0	1–1	3–2	1–2	1–3	0–1	0–2	2–1	2–0	2–1	3–1	2–2
Concepción	3–0	4–1	2–0		2–1	2–1	3–1	1–1	0–1	2–1	1–0	2–1	0–1	2–0	0–1	1–1	1–1	1–0
Everton	2–2	1–0	0–4	1–2		3–1	3–2	1–0	1–2	2–2	0–1	2–2	2–2	2–1	1–2	2–0	0–1	3–2
Green Cross T.	1–2	2–0	2–3	1–2	0–0		0–0	2–2	1–0	1–0	3–1	4–2	2–0	0–1	2–1	1–1	1–1	1–2
Huachipato	3–0	2–2	0–1	1–0	1–1	1–0		0–0	3–1	2–2	0–1	2–2	2–3	3–0	2–1	1–1	0–0	1–2
La Serena	1–4	4–0	1–1	2–0	1–1	1–4	3–2		2–1	1–2	3–0	1–0	1–2	1–1	0–1	2–1	3–3	1–0
Lota S.	2–2	1–2	3–1	2–0	0–1	1–1	1–2	2–2		3–2	0–1	1–1	2–0	3–2	3–2	0–2	1–1	0–1
Magallanes	6–0	2–1	0–0	3–0	2–1	1–1	2–4	0–1	3–1		3–0	3–0	1–2	0–3	3–0	0–1	1–2	1–3
O'Higgins	2–1	1–0	2–2	2–2	0–2	1–0	0–1	1–2	0–0	3–1		1–0	0–0	0–1	1–0	1–0	1–1	0–2
Rangers	0–0	1–2	2–3	1–0	2–1	6–1	1–0	1–0	3–1	0–1	2–2		2–1	1–1	2–1	2–3	1–0	0–1
San Felipe	3–1	2–1	2–1	2–0	2–0	2–2	1–1	2–0	2–1	4–0	1–0	1–1		1–4	3–1	2–3	1–1	1–0
La Calera	2–0	1–2	1–6	1–1	3–2	2–0	5–1	0–2	0–0	2–0	1–1	1–0	1–1		1–0	2–2	2–2	1–1
U. Católica	2–1	1–1	2–4	0–1	2–0	2–3	1–1	5–0	1–2	4–2	2–0	0–0	3–3	1–0		1–3	1–4	2–1
U. de Chile	2–1	5–2	0–0	7–2	2–2	3–0	2–0	5–1	1–2	3–0	5–4	4–0	3–4	2–2	2–0		0–1	4–1
U. Española	1–1	1–1	0–0	0–1	3–2	0–2	1–0	2–2	3–1	2–1	4–1	3–1	2–1	3–1	2–1	2–2		3–0
S. Wanderers	1–1	2–1	1–5	1–0	1–1	1–1	3–1	2–2	2–1	4–0	2–3	0–2	1–1	1–1	0–3	1–1	2–0	

Legend: Blue = home team win; Yellow = draw; Red = away team win.

== Relegation play-off ==
Lota Schwager	2–1	Audax Italiano

Pos	Team	Pld	W	D	L	GF	GA	GD	Pts	Relegation
1	Lota Schwager	1	1	0	0	2	1	+1	2	
2	Audax Italiano	1	0	0	1	1	2	−1	0	Relegated to 1972 Segunda División

== Top goalscorers ==
Rank	Name	Club	Goals
1	(Paraguay) Eladio Zárate	Universidad de Chile	25
2	(Chile) Fernando Espinoza	Magallanes	24
3	(Chile) Julio Crisosto	Unión Española	21
4	(Chile) Sergio Ahumada	Colo-Colo	17
5	(Chile) Manuel Núñez	Unión San Felipe	15

== Bibliography ==
- Marín Méndez, Edgardo (1995). Centenario historia total del fútbol chileno: 1895-1995. Santiago: Editores y Consultores REI.
