= Santiago City FC =

- Full name: Santiago City Football Club
- Nicknames: SanCity; Los Ciudadanos (The Citizens)
- Short name: Santiago City
- Founded: 25 May 2020; 6 years ago
- Ground: Estadio Municipal Las Condes; Las Condes, Santiago, Chile
- Owner: Francisco Basoalto
- Manager: Rafael Celedón
- League: Segunda División Profesional
- 2024: 1st (Champion)
- Website: www.sancity.cl
colours	colours

Santiago City FC is a Chilean association football club based in Las Condes, Santiago, Chile. They were founded in 2020 by Jorge Sotomayor and currently play in Segunda División Profesional de Chile at the Municipal Stadium in Las Condes, Santiago.

== History ==
Santiago City were founded in 2020 and entered the Chilean football leagues at tier 5 in the Tercera B. The club's president Jorge Sotomayor expressed a desire for the club to be promoted to the top tier. In their first season, they were promoted as champions. Their next season, they finished third in Tercera A. In November 2023, Sotomayor sold the club to a local lawyer. However, in December 2023 the Asociación Nacional de Fútbol Amateur de Chile (ANFA) suspended Santiago City for 3 years for failing to comply with media access requirements and for attempting to censor press coverage of the club. Specifically for cutting the electric cables that the media used. The club appealed against the sanction but their appeal was rejected and they were thrown out of the Tercera leagues. A further appeal in January 2024 to the ANFA Council of Presidents was successful and the ban was lifted.

== Colours and crest ==
When the club was founded, the colours were decided as a result of a market study. Black and pink were selected on the grounds that no other club in Chile aside of Colo-Colo played in a predominantly black kit and the pink was a tribute to women suffering from breast cancer, despite claims they looked like the American club Inter Miami CF. In February 2022, the English Premier League club Manchester City F.C. and its holding group City Football Group, issued a cease and desist letter against Santiago City for their crest being similar to the Manchester City crest. A year later, Santiago City announced they would follow any guidelines for their crest set down by Manchester City but had not received any.

== Players ==
=== Current squad ===
As of 2 August 2026. Note: Flags indicate national team as defined under FIFA eligibility rules; some limited exceptions apply. Players may hold more than one non-FIFA nationality.

No.	Pos.	Nation	Player
1	GK	ARG	Mauricio Maslovski
2	DF	CHI	Miguel Arias
3	DF	CHI	Ítalo Müller
4	DF	CHI	Diego González
5	DF	CHI	Diego Muñoz
6	MF	CHI	Andrés Díaz
7	FW	CHI	Matías Sáez
8	MF	CHI	Carlos Lobos
9	FW	CHI	Joaquín Agüero
10	MF	CHI	Marco Medel (c)
11	FW	CHI	Diego Cuéllar
12	GK	CHI	Ignacio Schulz
13	DF	CHI	Max Gatica
14	MF	CHI	Nicolás Clavería
15	MF	CHI	Ricardo Parra (loan from Santiago Wanderers)

No.	Pos.	Nation	Player
17	DF	CHI	Pablo Cárdenas
18	MF	CHI	Paulo Violante
20	MF	CHI	Bastián Arias (loan from Colo-Colo)
21	MF	CHI	Benjamín Arancibia
22	DF	CHI	Matías Quiroz
23	DF	CHI	Víctor González
24	FW	CHI	Tomás Barrios Du Monceau
25	GK	CHI	Martín Ballesteros (loan from Audax Italiano)
27	MF	CHI	Roberto Molina
28	DF	CHI	Diego Álvarez
29	MF	CHI	Ignacio Cataldo
30	FW	CHI	Fabián Núñez
35	GK	CHI	Carlos Ili
38	DF	CHI	Eugenio Orellana

== Managers ==
- (Chile) Cristian Febre (2022)
- (Chile) Jorge Acuña (2023)
- (Chile) Carlos Bussenius (2023)
- (Chile) Cristian Febre (2023)
- (Chile) Claudio Rojas (2024)
- (Chile) Luis Pérez (2024)
- (Argentina) Juan José Luvera (2025)
- (Chile) Yerko Abayay (2025)
- (Chile) Rafael Celedón (2025)
- (Chile) Cristian Febre (2026–Present)
