= Real Juventud San Joaquín =

Chilean football club

Real San Joaquín
- Nickname: Blucerchiati (Sampdoria)
- Founded: 1998
- Ground: Arturo Vidal; San Joaquín, Chile
- Capacity: 3,500 onlooker
- Owner: Jaime Lizama
- Chairman: Tatiana Reyes
- Coach: Jaime Lizama
- League: Segunda División Profesional
- 2021: Tercera División A 2° (Playoffs)
- Website: www.realjuventudsanjoaquin.cl
Home colours	Away colours	Third colours

Club Deportivo Real Juventud San Joaquín, also called Real San Joaquín, is a Chilean football club based in the commune of San Joaquín, Santiago de Chile. They currently play in the third level of Chilean football, the Segunda División.

== Stadium ==
The stadium of Real Juventud San Joaquín is the Stadium Arturo Vidal, named after footballer Arturo Vidal, whose home town was also San Joaquin.

- Direction: San Joaquín, Chile
- Capacity: 3,500

== Current squad ==
As of 9 July 2026. Note: Flags indicate national team as defined under FIFA eligibility rules; some limited exceptions apply. Players may hold more than one non-FIFA nationality.

No.	Pos.	Nation	Player
1	GK	CHI	Vicente Castellano
2	DF	CHI	Daniel Navarrete
4	DF	CHI	Alexandro Benavente
5	DF	CHI	Miguel Escalona
6	MF	CHI	Israel Muñoz (c)
7	FW	CHI	Nicolás Forttes
8	MF	CHI	Pablo Contreras
9	MF	CHI	Lucas Marcotti
10	MF	CHI	Benjamín Márquez
11	FW	CHI	Luis Farías
12	GK	HAI	Rutherley Saul
13	FW	CHI	Javier Fica
14	MF	CHI	Bryan Figueroa
15	DF	CHI	Vicente Cabrera

No.	Pos.	Nation	Player
16	MF	CHI	Joao Ugarte
17	FW	HAI	Lens Leger
18	FW	CHI	Boris González
19	FW	CHI	Matías Peralta
20	MF	CHI	Francisco Reyes
21	FW	CHI	Alberto Delus
22	MF	CHI	Jaime Carreño
23	MF	CHI	Luciano López
24	FW	CHI	Rocco Abruzzese
25	MF	COL	Yhoyner Gómez
26	MF	CHI	Yodilan Cruz
27	FW	CHI	Sebastián Núñez
28	MF	CHI	David Maureira
29	FW	CHI	Rubén Cobo

== Coach ==
- (Chile) Jaime Lizama (2013-)

== Honours ==
- Tercera División B: 1

2014

- Copa Absoluta: 0

Runner-up 2015

== Uniform ==
- Home Uniform: T-shirt sampdoria, blue pants and half blue.
- Away Uniform: T-shirt sampdoria red, red pants and half red.
- Third Uniform: T-shirt sampdoria black, black pants and half black.

Principal	Variant

== Sponsors ==
Period	Brand	Sponsor
2013	Kuden	Yanfranco Patuelli
2014	Kuden	La Gran Ocasión
2015	Kuden	Carnes Bilbao
2016	Kuden	La Gran Ocasión
2017-18	Kuden	Carnes Bilbao
2019-20	Vicaf	Carnes Bilbao
2022	Playmaker	Carnes Bilbao
2023	7PKTE	Carnes Bilbao
