= Rodelindo Román =

Chilean football club based in San Joaquín, Santiago

- Full name: Rodelindo Román Fútbol Club
- Nickname(s): El Rode, Banda del Rey
- Founded: November 16, 1956
- Ground: Estadio Municipal Arturo Vidal; San Joaquín, Chile
- Capacity: 3,500
- Owner: Arturo Vidal
- Chairman: Carlos Aliaga
- Coach: Rodolfo Madrid
- League: Segunda División
- 2020: Tercera A, 2nd (promoted)
Home colours	Away colours

Rodelindo Román is a Chilean Football club, their home town is San Joaquín, Santiago. They currently play in the third level of Chilean football, the Segunda División.

The club were founded on November 16, 1956 and participated for 1 year in Tercera División A and 2 year in Cuarta División.

It was the first club of midfielder Arturo Vidal, who became its owner in 2016.

== Seasons ==
- 1 season in Segunda División
- 1 season in Tercera A
- 2 season in Tercera B

== Players ==
=== Current squad ===
As of July 2022

Note: Flags indicate national team as defined under FIFA eligibility rules; some limited exceptions apply. Players may hold more than one non-FIFA nationality.

No.	Pos.	Nation	Player
1	GK	(Chile) CHI	Claudio Abarca
2	DF	(Chile) CHI	Ricardo Muñoz
3	MF	(Chile) CHI	Ramiro Gálvez
4	DF	(Chile) CHI	Rodrigo Sandoval
5	DF	(Chile) CHI	Ángel Rojas
6	MF	(Chile) CHI	Víctor Labrín
7	FW	(Chile) CHI	Nicolás Silva
8	MF	(Chile) CHI	Jorge Lagües
9	FW	(Chile) CHI	Martín Garrido
10	FW	(Chile) CHI	Fabián Bustos
11	FW	(Chile) CHI	Ignacio Ayala
12	GK	(Chile) CHI	Marcelo Jélvez
13	GK	(Chile) CHI	Andro Martinic
14	FW	(Chile) CHI	Christian Bustamante
15	DF	(Chile) CHI	Diego Carimán

No.	Pos.	Nation	Player
16	MF	(Chile) CHI	Nazareno Fernández
17	MF	(Chile) CHI	Roberto Romero
18	DF	(Chile) CHI	Luis Salazar
19	MF	(Chile) CHI	Víctor Castro
20	FW	(Chile) CHI	David Quiroz
21	DF	(Chile) CHI	Nicolás Aravena
22	MF	(Chile) CHI	Israel Muñoz
23	MF	(Chile) CHI	Mario Gajardo
24	MF	(Chile) CHI	Diego Oyarzún
25	GK	(Chile) CHI	José Castillo
26	MF	(Chile) CHI	Carlos Cisternas
27	DF	(Chile) CHI	César Evans
28	MF	(Chile) CHI	Lucas Rojas
29	MF	(Nigeria) NGA	Augustine Ezeali
30	FW	(Chile) CHI	Alessandro Rizzoli

== Titles ==
- Tercera B: 2019

== See also ==
- Chilean football league system
