= Unión San Felipe =

Association football club

- Full name: Club de Deportes Unión San Felipe
- Nicknames: Uni-Uni; Aconcagüinos
- Founded: October 16, 1956; 69 years ago
- Ground: Estadio Municipal de San Felipe
- Capacity: 12,000
- Chairman: Raúl Delgado
- Manager: Francisco Palladino
- League: Primera B
- 2025: Primera B, 15th of 16
| Home colours | Away colours |

Club de Deportes Unión San Felipe, commonly known as Unión San Felipe or simply San Felipe, is a professional football club based in the city of San Felipe, in the Valparaíso Region of Chile. Founded on October 16, 1956, the club currently competes in the Primera B, the second tier of the Chilean football league system.

Unión San Felipe is best known for its historic ascent in the early 1970s, when it became the only club in Chilean football history to win the second division (1970) and the first division in consecutive seasons—claiming the Primera División de Chile title in 1971, just a year after earning promotion. That triumph earned them a place in the 1972 Copa Libertadores, marking their debut on the continental stage.

The club has also won the Primera B championship twice (1970 and 2009) and lifted the Copa Chile in 2009, qualifying for the 2010 Copa Sudamericana. San Felipe's home ground is the Estadio Municipal de San Felipe, a traditional venue with a capacity of approximately 12,000 spectators.

Nicknamed «El Uni-Uni», the club is renowned for its provincial identity, strong local fanbase, and historic role in breaking the dominance of Chile’s major urban teams in early 1970s.

== History ==
The club was founded on October 16, 1956, as a merger between San Felipe F.C. and Atlético Unión, two traditional amateur clubs from the city of San Felipe, located in the Aconcagua Valley of central Chile. The aim of the merger was to unite local efforts and talent in order to gain entry into the professional ranks of Chilean football, and to represent the province at a national level.

The club was admitted into the Segunda División de Chile (Second Division) in 1958. During its early seasons, Unión San Felipe became known for its disciplined playing style, solid local support, and a strong sense of identity rooted in its provincial pride. The team gradually improved its standings, gaining respect as a well-managed institution despite limited financial resources.

The turning point in the club's history came in 1970, when Unión San Felipe won the Segunda División, earning promotion to the Primera División for the first time in its history. Astonishingly, just one year later, in 1971, Unión San Felipe achieved an unprecedented feat by winning the Primera División championship in its debut season at the top level. Coached by Luis Santibáñez, the team featured a blend of experienced players and emerging talents, playing an aggressive and organized style that surprised many of the country’s traditional football powers.

This title win made Unión San Felipe the only Chilean club in history to win the second division and the first division in back-to-back seasons, a record that still stands. As national champions, they qualified for the 1972 Copa Libertadores, where they were drawn into a group with Nacional and Peñarol of Uruguay and fellow Chilean side Universidad de Chile. Although they were eliminated in the group stage, their participation marked a milestone for the club.

Throughout the 1970s and 1980s, Unión San Felipe remained in the Primera División, though unable to replicate its earlier success. The club became a fixture in the mid-to-lower end of the table and experienced several relegation battles.

=== 21st Century ===
After several seasons of struggle in the lower tiers, Unión San Felipe experienced a major resurgence in 2009. Under the management of Ivo Basay, the team had an extraordinary year, winning the Primera B (Second Division) title and earning promotion to the Primera División. That same year, the club also claimed the Copa Chile title, defeating Deportes Iquique 3–0 in the final. This made Unión San Felipe one of the few clubs in Chilean football history to win both a league title and a major domestic cup in the same season.

Their Copa Chile triumph qualified them for the 2010 Copa Sudamericana, in which they faced Ecuadorian club LDU Quito. Although they were eliminated in the first round, the club once again made headlines for reaching an international competition.

Back in the top flight, San Felipe initially managed to stay competitive, finishing 9th in the 2010 season. However, financial difficulties, managerial instability, and inconsistent performances led to the club’s eventual relegation back to the Primera B in 2012. Since then, Unión San Felipe has remained in the Primera B.

== Current squad ==
Current squad of Unión San Felipe as of 1 July 2026 (edit)
Sources: ANFP Official Web Site

| No. | | Position | Player |
|---|---|---|---|
| 1 | CHI | GK | Andrés Fernández |
| 2 | ARG | DF | Valentín Perales |
| 3 | CHI | DF | Byron Guajardo |
| 4 | CHI | DF | Martín Ramírez (loan from Deportes La Serena) |
| 5 | CHI | DF | Diego Bravo |
| 6 | CHI | MF | Axel León |
| 7 | CHI | FW | Óscar Henríquez |
| 8 | ARG | MF | Norberto Palmieri |
| 9 | CHI | FW | Benjamín Aravena (loan from Universidad de Chile) |
| 10 | CHI | MF | Gonzalo Jara |
| 11 | CHI | FW | Facundo Mera |
| 12 | CHI | GK | Leandro Cañete |
| 14 | CHI | FW | Bairo Riveros |
| 16 | CHI | DF | Diego Pereira |
| 17 | CHI | MF | Raimundo Díaz |

| No. | | Position | Player |
|---|---|---|---|
| 18 | CHI | FW | Patricio Muñoz |
| 20 | ARG | FW | Agustín Fontana |
| 21 | URU | MF | Nicolás Brun |
| 23 | ARG | FW | Bruno Vides |
| 24 | CHI | MF | Mariano Galleguillos |
| 25 | CHI | MF | Valentín Sánchez |
| 26 | CHI | MF | Bruno Ponce |
| 27 | CHI | MF | Luis García |
| 28 | CHI | MF | Ignacio Jara |
| 29 | CHI | MF | Lucas Martínez |
| 31 | CHI | MF | Joaquín Olguín |
| 32 | CHI | FW | Franco Lobos (loan from Santiago Wanderers) |
| 33 | CHI | MF | Bryan González (loan from Universidad Católica) |
| 34 | CHI | DF | Cristián Suárez (c) |
| 35 | CHI | GK | Roberto Palacios |

Manager: Juan José Luvera

== Managers ==
- (Argentina) José Luis Boffi (1958)
- (Chile) Delfín Silva (1958)
- (Chile) Ulises Ramos (1959)
- (Argentina) Julio Baldovinos (1960-1961)
- (Chile) Luis Tirado (1964)
- (Argentina) Julio Baldovinos (1964)
- (Chile) Delfín Silva (1964-1968)
- (Chile) Guillermo Díaz Zambrano (1968)
- (Chile) Luis Santibáñez (1970-1971)
- (Chile) Claudio Ramírez (1972)
- (Chile) Luis Santibáñez (1972)
- (Argentina) Donato Hernández (1973)
- (Chile) Salvador Gálvez (1973)
- (Argentina) Julio Baldovinos (1974)
- (Chile) Isaac Carrasco (1977)
- (Chile) Jorge Venegas (1980)
- (Argentina) Julio Baldovinos (1982-1983)
- (Chile) Andrés Prieto (1983)
- (Chile) Luis Santibáñez (1983)
- (Argentina) Julio Baldovinos (1984)
- (Chile) Antonio Vargas (1984)
- (Chile) Jorge Luco (1985)
- (Chile) Pedro Quiroz Flores (1985)
- (Chile) Salvador Gálvez (1986)
- (Chile) Víctor Zelada (1988)
- (Chile) Eugenio Jara (1988)
- (Chile) Rolando García (1988)
- (Chile) Luis Ramírez (1989)
- (Chile) Gustavo Cortés (1989-1990)
- (Chile) Eugenio Jara (1990)
- (Chile) Gustavo Cortés (1991-1992)
- (Chile) Miguel Hermosilla (1992)
- (Chile) Manuel Gaete (1993-1994)
- (Chile) Salvador Gálvez (1994)
- (Chile) Gustavo Cortés (1995-1996)
- (Chile) Freddy Delgado (1997)
- (Chile) Alfredo Núñez (1997)
- (Argentina) Julio Di Meola (1998-1999)
- (Argentina) César Laraignée (1999)
- (Chile) Hernán Godoy (1999)
- (Chile) Raúl Toro (2000-2003)
- (Chile) Mario Soto (2004)
- (Chile) Hernán Godoy (2004-2005)
- (Chile) Rubén Espinoza (2006)
- (Argentina) Ariel Paolorossi (2006)
- (Argentina) Daniel Chazarreta (2007-2008)
- (Chile) Héctor Roco (2008)
- (Argentina) Roberto Mariani (2008-2009)
- (Argentina) Gustavo Cisneros (2010)
- (Chile) Ivo Basay (2010)
- (Chile) Nelson Cossio (2011)
- (Chile) Héctor Roco (2011)
- (Argentina) Daniel Chazarreta (2011)
- (Argentina) Víctor Hugo Marchesini (2011)
- (Chile) Nelson Cossio (2011-2012)
- (Argentina) Daniel Chazarreta (2012)
- (Chile) Marco Antonio Figueroa (2012)
- (Chile) Nelson Soto (2012-2013)
- (Chile) Jorge Miranda (2013)
- (Argentina) Gustavo Cisneros (2013)
- (Argentina) Sebastián Rambert (2014)
- (Chile) Jorge Miranda (2014)
- (Chile) Miguel Ponce (2014-2015)
- (Argentina) César Vigevani (2015)
- (Chile) Fernando Guajardo (2015)
- (Argentina) Germán Corengia (2015-2016)
- (Chile) Luis Fredes (2016)
- (Argentina) Christian Lovrincevich (2016)
- (Argentina) César Vigevani (2017)
- (Chile) Hernán Madrid (2017)
- (Argentina) Damián Ayude (2017-2018)
- (Chile) Omar Arcos (2018)
- (Argentina) Christian Lovrincevich (2018)
- (Chile) Omar Arcos (2018)
- (Chile) Hernán Madrid (2018)
- (Argentina) Andrés Yllana (2019)
- (Argentina) Mauro Peralta (2019)
- (Argentina) Germán Corengia (2019)
- (Chile) Erwin Durán (2020)
- (Chile) Héctor Roco (2020-2021)
- (Argentina) Tomás Arrotea (2021)
- (Chile) Jorge Acuña (2021)
- (Chile) Víctor Rivero (2021)
- (Chile) Jonathan Orellana (2022)
- (Chile) Nicolás Suárez (2022)
- (Chile) Víctor Rivero (2022)
- (Argentina) Germán Cavalieri (2023)
- (Chile) Miguel Sánchez (2023)
- (Argentina) Juan Manuel López (2023)
- (Chile) Víctor Rivero (2023)
- (Chile) Jonathan Orellana (2024)
- (Argentina) Christian Lovrincevich (2024)
- (Chile) Ricardo González (2024)
- (Chile) Damián Muñoz (2024)
- (Chile) Ítalo Pinochet (2025)
- (Argentina) Pablo Álvarez (2025)
- (Uruguay) Francisco Palladino (2025)
- (Chile) Luis Landeros (2026)
- (Chile) Esteban Carvajal (2026)
- (Argentina) Juan José Luvera (2026-)

== Honours ==
=== National ===
- Primera División
  - Winners (1): 1971
- Copa Chile
  - Winners (1): 2009
- Primera B
  - Winners (3): 1970, 2000, 2009

== South American cups history ==
| Season | Competition | Round | Country | Club | Home | Away | Aggregate |
|---|---|---|---|---|---|---|---|
| 1972 | Copa Libertadores | Group Stage; Group 4 | (Chile) | Universidad de Chile | 3–2 | 1–2 | 4th Place |
| 1972 | Copa Libertadores | Group Stage; Group 4 | (Peru) | Alianza Lima | 0–0 | 0–1 | 4th Place |
| 1972 | Copa Libertadores | Group Stage; Group 4 | (Peru) | Universitario | 1–3 | 0–0 | 4th Place |
| 2010 | Copa Sudamericana | Second Round | (Paraguay) | Guaraní | 1–1 | 1–1 | 2–2 8-7p |
| 2010 | Copa Sudamericana | Third Round | (Ecuador) | L.D.U. Quito | 4–2 | 1–6 | 5–8 |
