= Provincial Ovalle =

Chilean football team

- Full name: Club Deportivo Provincial Ovalle FC
- Nickname: Ciclón del Limarí (Cyclone from Limarí)
- Short name: Provincial Ovalle
- Founded: 1 June 1942; 84 years ago (as Deportivo Socos)
- Ground: Estadio Diaguita; Ovalle, Chile
- Capacity: 5,160
- Chairman: Cristián Venegas
- Manager: Juan José Luvera
- League: Segunda División Profesional
- 2023: Tercera A, 1st of 15 (champions)

Provincial Ovalle is a Chilean football club based in the city of Ovalle, Chile. They currently play in the Segunda División Profesional and have played in Copa Chile.

== Players ==
=== Current squad ===
As of 16 August 2026. Note: Flags indicate national team as defined under FIFA eligibility rules; some limited exceptions apply. Players may hold more than one non-FIFA nationality.

No.	Pos.	Nation	Player
1	GK	CHI	Kevin Catalán
2	MF	CHI	Lukas Arce
3	DF	CHI	César González
4	DF	CHI	Sebastián Contreras
5	DF	CHI	Erick Millalén
6	DF	CHI	Jaime Soto
7	FW	CHI	Nicolás Julio (loan from Coquimbo Unido)
8	MF	CHI	Luis Cabrera (c)
9	FW	CHI	Martín Meneses
10	MF	ARG	Albano Becica
11	FW	CHI	Luis Maluenda (loan from Deportes Limache)
12	GK	CHI	Guillermo Orellana
13	MF	ARG	Mauro Maureira
14	DF	CHI	Odswart Canessa
16	DF	CHI	Bastián Solano

No.	Pos.	Nation	Player
17	MF	CHI	Benjamín Vega
18	GK	CHI	Claudio Abarca
19	FW	CHI	Benjamín Castro (loan from Colo-Colo)
20	DF	CHI	Nicolás Rivera
21	DF	CHI	Camilo Matamala (loan from Universidad Católica)
22	DF	CHI	Diego Cerón
23	FW	CHI	Renato Tarifeño
24	DF	CHI	Matías Ávila
25	MF	CHI	Fabián Rosales
26	FW	CHI	Gabriel Suazo
27	MF	CHI	Luckas Carreño
28	FW	CHI	Benjamín Cortés
29	FW	ARG	Cristian Duma
30	MF	CHI	Bastián Araya

=== Former players ===
- (Argentina) Nicolás Aguirre
- (Chile) Jorge Araya
- (Chile) Diego Bravo
- (Chile) Ronald González
- (Chile) Matías Rojas

== Honours ==
Nationals
Competition	Titles	Runners-up
Tercera División B (1/0)	2016

== Managers ==
- (Chile) Ramón Climent (2018)
- (Chile) Ricardo Rojas (2020–2022)
- (Chile) Luis Pérez (2023–2024)
- (Chile) Felipe Cornejo (2024–present)
- (Chile) Marcelo Palma (2025)
- (Chile) Jonathan Orellana (2026)
- (Argentina) Juan José Luvera (2026–)
