= San Antonio Unido =

Association football club in Chile

- Full name: Club Social y Deportivo San Antonio Unido
- Nicknames: SAU; Lilas (Lilac) "La Gaviota" (The Seagull)
- Founded: July 21, 1961; 65 years ago
- Ground: Estadio Municipal Doctor Olegario Henríquez Escalante; San Antonio, Chile
- Capacity: 2,024
- Owner: Esteban Paredes
- Chairman: Guillermo Lee
- Manager: Ariel Pereyra
- League: Segunda División
- 2020: 7th
Home colours	Away colours

Club Social y Deportivo San Antonio Unido, usually referred to as SAU is a football club located in the port city of San Antonio, Chile, situated in the Valparaíso Region. It was founded on July 21, 1961. Its football team currently plays in Segunda División.

== History ==
The club was created in 1961, in order to bring the enjoyment of football to a growing port city that was experiencing a surge with internal migration. In 1967 the club was known as San Antonio Unido Portuario (SAUP) in order to include the management company that was in charge of the port.

After 1975 the name returned as San Antonio Unido until 1983, when the team was relegated to the Chilean third division never returning to the Primera B. The club experienced a financial recession of eight years and were not active until being refounded on December 10, 1991, adding the Social to their club name.

== Squad ==
As of 5 May 2025. Note: Flags indicate national team as defined under FIFA eligibility rules; some limited exceptions apply. Players may hold more than one non-FIFA nationality.

No.	Pos.	Nation	Player
1	GK	CHI	Nery Veloso
2	DF	CHI	Kevin Hidalgo
3	DF	ARG	Yago Piro
4	DF	CHI	Sebastián Monreal
5	DF	CHI	Darko Fiamengo
7	FW	CHI	Mauro Lopes
8	MF	CHI	Jesús Arancibia
9	FW	CHI	Diego Cuéllar
10	MF	ARG	Ramón Fernández
12	GK	CHI	Joaquín Araya
14	MF	CHI	David Núñez
15	FW	CHI	Yerald Pinilla
16	MF	CHI	Dilan Acevedo

No.	Pos.	Nation	Player
17	MF	CHI	Carlos Gómez
18	FW	ARG	Gabriel Tellas
19	FW	CHI	Cristóbal Díaz
20	MF	CHI	Martín Lara
21	MF	CHI	Pablo Sanhueza
22	DF	CHI	Alan Riquelme
23	MF	CHI	René Meléndez
24	DF	ARG	Matías Carrera
25	FW	ARG	Matías Sandoval
27	FW	CHI	Juan Pablo Reyes
28	DF	CHI	Roberto Cereceda
30	GK	CHI	Sergio Cabello

== Honours ==
- Copa Apertura Segunda División
  - Winners (1): 1970

== See also ==
- Chilean football league system
