= List of foreign Primera División de El Salvador players (1926–1998) =

The following is a list of foreign players who played in the Primera División de Fútbol Profesional, a fully professional soccer league which existed in El Salvador between 1926 and 1998, prior to the restructure and change of format in 1998.

The listed players have played at least one official game for their respective clubs. Players in italic were born overseas but went on to be naturalised and in some cases played for the El Salvador national football team. Players in bold played for their national team.

== Naturalized players (Note: Players that have been born abroad, moved to El Salvador later than the age of twelve, acquired El Salvador citizenship and waived the opportunity to play for the national teams of their native countries in order to be eligible to play for El Salvador) ==
- (Argentina) Manolo Jovino Álvarez – UES (1970), LA Firpo (1970), FAS (1975–1976), (1981–1986), Once Municipal (1977), Alianza (1986)
- (Honduras) Francisco "El Tigre" Zamora – Alianza
- (Uruguay) Albert Fay - Juventud Olimpica, Aguila (1973-74), Platense (1975-1976)
- (Uruguay) Jorge Leonardo Garay – C.D. Aguila 1996–1997
- (Uruguay) Jorge Milton "Bomba" Villar – C.D. Aguila 1996–1997
- (Socialist Federal Republic of Yugoslavia) Vladan Vićević – C.D. Águila (1996–1998)

== Africa – CAF ==
=== Nigeria ===
- Charles Unaka – Alianza F.C. (1995)

=== Sierra Leone ===
- **Abdul Thompson Conteh** – Atlético Marte (1994–1995)

== South America – CONMEBOL ==
=== Argentina ===
- Luis Condomi – C.D. Aguila (1974), Juventud Olímpica (1971-73), Atletico Marte (1978)
- José Emilio Mitrovich – C.D. Aguila (1984)
- Juan Carlos Veloso – C.D. Aguila (1985)
- Fabián Suchini – C.D. Aguila (1989–1990)
- Carlos Rubén Salas – C.D. Aguila (1989–1990)
- Daniel Messina – C.D. Aguila (1993–1994)
- Gregorio Bundio – Atlético Marte (1952–1953), C.D. Dragón (1954–1955)
- Ariel Goldman – C.D. Aguila (1993–1994)
- Raúl Forteis – ANTEL (1976), Alianza (1978–1980), Chalatenango (1979)
- Martin di Luca – Alianza (1993–1994)
- Hugo Neira – Alianza (1993–1994)
- Sergio Bufarini – Alianza (1993–1994)
- Hugo Sigliano – Alianza
- Óscar "Nene" Escalante – Atletico Marte (1978–1979)
- Alfredo di Maio – Atletico Marte (1978–1979)
- Miguel Ángel "Trucutú" Martínez – Atletico Marte (1978–1979), Chalatenango (1988–1989)
- Arnaldo Luis Martínez – C.D. Chalatenango (1985–1987)
- Roberto López – FAS (1975)
- Enzo Graniello – FAS (1975)
- Domingo Albil – FAS (1970-72, 1974–1976), Sonsonate (1975-77)
- **Agustín Balbuena** –FAS (1977)
- Antonio Imbelloni – FAS (1955–1958)
- Héctor Pasaquiri – FAS (1968)
- Gabriel Perrone – FAS (1991–1995)
- Amado Abraham – C.D. FAS (1974–1975, 1976–1985)
- Hector Alcides Piccioni – C.D. FAS (1968–1980)
- Raúl Casadei – C.D. FAS (1974–1978)
- José Luis Cárdenas – C.D. FAS (1991–1992)
- Juan Manuel Villarreal – C.D. FAS (1991–1992)
- Nelson San Lorenzo – C.D. FAS (1965-1968), Exclesior (1971-72), ADLER
- Néstor Cataldo – C.D. FAS (1983)
- Dario Juarez – C.D. FAS (1989)
- Sergio Castellanos – C.D. FAS (1989)
- Carlos Álvarez – C.D. FAS (1989)
- Marcelo Bauzá – C.D. FAS (1995)
- Fulgencio Deonel Bordón – C.D. FAS (1995)
- Carlos Eduardo Martínez Sequeira – C.D. FAS, Once Lobos
- Mariano Dalla Libera – C.D. FAS (1986-1987)
- Ricardo Carreño – Once Lobos (1985)
- Roberto López – Once Municipal (1977–1978)
- Raúl Cocherari – UCA (1971), Tapachulteca (1975–1976), Once Municipal (1977–1978), Alianza (1979)
- Norberto Zafanella – ADLER, Platense (1975–1977)
- Roque Antonio 'Tony' Rojas – UES (1974–1975), Platense (1976–1978), Juventud Olímpica (1973)
- Nicolás Volpini – Platense (1977–1978)
- Luis Secundino Páez – Fuerte Aguilares (1974), Platense (1977–1979), Alianza, C.D. FAS (1980)
- Rene Joaquin Cazalbón – UES (1971), Juventud Olímpica (1974–1975)
- Oswaldo Crosta – Once Municipal (1965–1968)
- Victor Donato – UES (1973–1976), Firpo (1976–1977)
- Bruno Ferrari – C.D. Dragón
- Nestor Doroni – C.D. Aguila (1988)
- Jorge Tripicchio – Fuerte Aguilares (1974), UES (1977-78)
- Miguel Ángel "Rata" Cobián – Negocios Internacionales (1974–1976)
- Kelerman – Juventud Olímpica
- Jorge Tripchio - Fuerte Aguilares (1976)
- Gerónimo Pericullo – Atlético Marte
- Juan Bautista Pérez – Atlético Marte
- Raúl ‘Pibe’ Vásquez – Leones FC (1966), Atlético Marte (1957, 1964), Aguila (1959-1960)
- Juan Andres Rios – Atlético Marte (1964, 1971), Limeno (1974)
- Carlos Alberto Chavano – Atlético Marte (1966)
- Hugo Ponce - C.D. Adler (1965)
- Hector Edmundo Abrita - Aguila (1973-74)
- Guillermo Fischer - TBD, Dragon (1978-79)
- Daniel Cacho Sosa - Juventud Olímpica
- Roberto Celestino - Independiente (1978)
- José Luis Giusti - Independiente (1978)
- Mariano del Olivera - TBD
- Hugo Luis Lencina - Juventud Olímpica (1969-71), Atletico Marte ()
- Ruben Bueno - Santiagueno
- Jose Alberto Volpe - Santiagueno
- Eduardo Space - Aguila (1966)
- Jorge Alberto Diz - Once Municipal (1965)
- Hector Mariano - FAS (1957-59)
- Jose Chingolo Rodriguez - FAS (1959)
- Hector Dadderio - FAS (1957-59)
- Alberto Cevasco - FAS (1957)
- Omar Muraco - FAS (1957)
- Javier Novello - FAS (1957)
- Hector Omar Cuco Lopez - FAS (1962)
- Alejandro Biegler - Cojutepeque (1987)
- Omar Chiodin - Juventud Olímpica
- Rodolfo Baello - Juventud Olímpica (1973), Atletico Marte (1964-65, 1971)
- Juan Quarterone - UES (1970-72)
- Jose Carlos Lupporini - ANTEL (1976)
- Planetti - Once Lobos (1979-80)
- Roberto Lopez - Once Municipal, FAS (1975)
- Mario Zanotti - Once Municipal (1977)
- Anselmo Marocchi – ADLER
- Oscar Tedini - Atletico Marte
- Eduardo Lamparelli - Atletico Marte
- Alejandro Juan Glomba - Aguila (1982)
- Salvador Azerrad - FAS (1985)
- Juan Carlos Conde - Atletico Marte (1966)
- Marcelo Guitterez - Metapan FC (1991)
- Enrique Mendoza - Fuerte Aguilares (1974)
- Oscar Escalante - Atletico Marte (1978)

=== Brazil ===
- Adalto Barbosa - Alianza F.C. (1969)
- Ademir Barbosa Das Neves – C.D Santiagueño (1979), C.D. Águila (1974–1978)
- Adilson Barbon - Alianza F.C. (1969)
- Adonis Hilario – C.D. Águila (1996)
- Aguinaldo Pinto de Melo - C.D. Águila (1978)
- Alan Marcos de Queiroz – C.D. Águila (1975–1976,78)
- Alcides de Oliveira - Metapan FC (1991)
- Alcyr Coutinho – Sonsonate (1968), C.D. Águila (1968), UCA (1971), Atletico Marte
- Alvery Rodrigues Dos Santos - Atletico Marte (1992)
- Ailton Batista- Apaneca (1992–93)
- Antonio David Pinho Gomes – C.D. Águila (1968–1983)
- Bimba Barrabas – Firpo (1980)
- Candido de Asis- Once Lobos (1986–1987)
- Carlos Alberto - Excelsior (1971-72)
- Carlos Alberto Lopez – Aguila (1968)
- Carlos Alberto Seixas – Alianza F.C. (1990–91), C.D. FAS (1992–1993)
- Carlos López Neves – Firpo (1976–1985)
- Carlos Roberto Barbosa - ANTEL (1976), Dragon (1977-79)
- Carlos Roberto Barboza – ANTEL, Once Municipal(1977–1978), Independiente (1979–1980)
- Clarival Oliveira – C.D. Águila (1967–1968), Sonsonate (1968-69)
- Coutiñho - Sonsonate
- Custodio Le Roy – Sonsonate
- De Oliveira – C.D. Chalatenango (1982)
- Dercy Custodio - C.D. Sonsonate (1968)
- Dorivaldo Becca – FAS (1967–1969)
- Durval Carvalho - C.D. Sonsonate (1968)
- Edenilson Franco – Sonsonate (1969), UES, Alianza F.C., Atletico Marte (1971)
- Edson Ferreira da Silva – Fuerte San Francisco (1992–1993)
- Eraldo Correia – C.D Santiagueño (1977–1980), C.D. FAS (1981–1982), C.D. Sonsonate (1983, 1984), Firpo (1985), Acajutla (1986–1990), Cojutepeque F.C. (1991–1992), ADET (1992–1993), C.D. Dragon (1994–1995)
- Ernesto Páez de Oliveira – Firpo (1980–1981)
- Eduardo Santana – C.D. Aguila (1986–1987)
- Enos Pereira - ANTEL (1974-75)
- Fernando de Moura – Firpo (1989–1992), ADET (1995–1997)
- Ferreira da Silva – Sonsonate (1967)
- Figueredo - Atletico Marte (1977-78)
- Francisco Puglio – UES
- Francisco Salvador Filho – C.D. Aguila (1992–1993)
- Geraldo Barreto – Firpo (1993–1994)
- Gerardo de Oliveira – Metapan FC (1991–1992)
- Zizinho – FAS (1985–1987)
- Gérson Enor Voss - Atletico Marte
- Hélio Rodrigues – Atletico Marte, Alianza F.C. (1969), UES (1972), Juventud Olímpica (1973), C.D. Águila (1974–1975)
- Henrique Pasiquirl - Alianza F.C. (1969)
- **João Batista Nunes** - Tiburones F.C.
- João Alves – Sonsonate (1967)
- João Cabral Filho – Firpo (1986–1987)
- João Da Silva – ADET (1995–1996)
- Jonás López – C.D. Águila (1967–1968)
- Jorge Linares Barbosa - Fuerte Aguilares (1976)
- Jorge Lopes dos Santos - C.D. Águila (1971)
- José Luis Januario – Alianza F.C. (1978–1980)
- Jorge Nunes – Firpo(1985–1986)
- Jorge Tupinambá dos Santos – C.D. Águila (1967–1968), UES (1971-72)
- José "Zé" Rodríguez – Acajutla (1987–1988)
- José Taneses - Alianza F.C. (1970-71)
- Juarandyr Dos Santos – Excelsior (1971), C.D. Luis Ángel Firpo (1974), Negocios Internacionales (1975–1976)
- Jurandir dos Santos - Alianza F.C. (1969), Negocios Internacionales (1974-75)
- Justino da Silva – Independiente (1979–1980)
- Luis Ferreira – Firpo (1986–1987)
- Marco Antonio Pereira – Firpo (1982), Once Lobos (1983), C.D. Aguila (1984–1985), C.D. Chalatenango (1986–1987), C.D. Dragon (1989–1990), Metapan FC (1990-1991), Independiente FC
- Marcos Aparecido – Apaneca (1992–1993)
- Mario Aparecido Baezo – Sonsonate (1967)
- Mario Baesso - C.D. Sonsonate (1967-68)
- Marquinho – C.D. Aguila (1981-82)
- Mazinho – Alianza F.C. (1979–1980)
- Naudemir Sales da Silva – Apaneca (1992–93)
- Ned Barboza – C.D. Aguila (1986–1987)
- Nelson de Moraes – Firpo (1975–1980), Alianza F.C. (1980-1981)
- Nestor Trevisan - Alianza F.C. (1968)
- Nilton Nobrega – Sonsonate (1976-77)
- Nilton Rodarte – Alianza F.C. (1970-71)
- Nilton Rodarte – C.D. Águila (1995)
- Odir Jacques – Sonsonate (1968,1975-77), C.D. FAS (1968-1969), Alianza F.C., Atletico Marte (1971)
- Odón da Rocha – Alianza F.C. (1978–1979)
- Paulo Italmir - C.D. Águila (1967)
- Pedro Dacunha – Once Municipal
- Pedro Damasco – C.D Santiagueño
- Pio da Silva – Firpo (1975)
- Roberto Cousanni – Sonsonate (1967)
- Robson Mattos de Moura – Firpo (1986)
- Salvador Azerrad – FAS (1986–1987)
- Salvador Filho – Firpo (1986–1987), C.D. Aguila (1991–1992)
- Sebastian Pío da Silva – Firpo (1983)
- Toninho – Sonsonate (1968–1969)
- Toninho Dos Santos – Firpo (1989–1991), C.D. Aguila (2002)
- Vermelho Rodriguez - C.D. Águila (1968)
- Virgilio de Camargo - Alianza F.C. (1970-71)
- Wendel Ramos – Fuerte San Francisco (1990), C.D. Aguila (1992), C.D. Dragon (1995)
- Zezinho - Atletico Marte (1977-78)
- Ze Rodriguez - Acajutla (1987)
- **Zózimo** – C.D. Águila (1967–1968)

=== Chile ===
- **Luis Hernán Álvarez** – Alianza F.C. (1966–1967)
- Jorge Amaya – C.D. Luis Ángel Firpo (1975–76)
- Juan Arrastoa - Dragon (1978)
- Manuel Baeza – Acajutla (1989–1990)
- Henry Barrientos - Dragon (1990–91)
- Wilfredo Barrientos – Izabal JC (1974), Sonsonate (1974–78), UES (1978–79)
- Juan Carlos Carreño – C.D. Aguila (1986–1988)
- Belisario Díaz – Atlético Marte (1975)
- Horacio Díaz Luco – C.D. Aguila (1974–1977)
- Julio Escobar – C.D. Luis Ángel Firpo (1967)
- **Julio Gallego** – C.D. Luis Ángel Firpo (1975)
- Hernán Godoy – Alianza F.C. (1973)
- Carlos González – C.D. Luis Ángel Firpo (198?–9?)
- Hernán Gonzáles – UES
- Miguel Hermosilla – Alianza F.C. (1965–1968, 1974)
- Enrique Iturra – Alianza F.C. (1973-74), Sonsonate (1975), Tapachulteca (1975–1976)
- Mario Iubini – Atlético Marte (1975), C.D Santiagueño (1978), Cojutepeque F.C. (1986)
- Francisco Labraña - Atlante
- **José Moris** – Atlético Marte (1974)
- **Adolfo Olivares** – Alianza F.C. (1974)
- Hugo Ottensen – Alianza F.C. (1973), Independiente (1978), C.D. Chalatenango (1979)
- Sergio Pardo – C.D Santiagueño (197?)
- Andrés Paretti – Alianza F.C. (1965–1966), C.D. Luis Ángel Firpo
- Eduardo Quintanilla – C.D. Águila (197?–1977)
- Leonardo Salas - Atlante San Alejo (1967, 1968–?), Alianza F.C. (1967–68)
- **Efraín Santander** - Excelsior (1972)
- Patricio Sasmay - Excelsior (1971), Atlético Marte (1972)
- Ricardo Sepúlveda – Alianza F.C. (1965–68), Atlético Marte (1969–71), Municipal Limeño (1972–73)
- José Sulantay – UES (1968), Atlético Marte (1969)
- Raúl Toro – Alianza F.C. (1989–90), C.D. Luis Ángel Firpo (1991–2000)
- **Ricardo Toro** – C.D. FAS (1994)
- **Hugo Villanueva** – UES (1967)

=== Colombia ===
- Juan Carlos Cachimbo – ADET (1997–1998)
- Camilo Prado – Apaneca (1993–1994)

=== Paraguay ===
- Julio Cesar Achucarro – Metapan F.C. (1988)
- **Benigno Apodaca** - UES (1972)
- Miguel Godoy Baldovinos - Aguila (1984)
- Tito Bernal - Alianza FC
- Nelson Brizuela – Sonsonate (1970), Excélsior F.C. (1973–1974), Municipal Limeno (1974–1975)
- Gervasio Martínez Canete – Metapan F.C. (1988–1992), Once Lobos (1995–1996)
- Julio César Chávez – Cojutepeque (1988–1990), Firpo (1989–1990), Fuerte San Francisco (1992–1993)
- **Julián Coronel** - Alianza FC
- Eradio Espinoza - Alianza FC
- Jose Maria Gonzalez - Dragon (1989-90)
- Domingo Irala – Firpo (1986-87)
- Emiliano Ramón Fernández Riera – Jose Maria Gondro (1986–1987), Metapan F.C., Firpo (1986-87)
- **Jorge Lino Romero** - Atlante (1961-1962), Atletico Marte (1963)
- Julio Servin – Tapachulteca (1975–1976), Sonsonate (1977)
- Luis Alberto Sosa – Metapan F.C. (1988), Firpo (1986-87, 1992–1993)
- Venancio Zelaya - UES (1986)

=== Peru ===
- Percy Aguilar – Alianza F.C. (1993),
- Fernando Alva – Alianza F.C. (1975–1976), FAS (1976–1977), Once Municipal (1977–1978)
- **Agustín Castillo** – Atletico Marte (1990–1993), C.D. Aguila (1994–1996), C.D. FAS (1996–1997)
- **Fidel Ernesto Suárez Becerra** – Atlético Marte (1994)
- Carlos Izquierdo Sánchez – UES (1982)
- Guillermo Correa – C.D. Luis Ángel Firpo (1974)
- Manuel "Loco" Dávila – ADET (1992)
- Martín Duffú – C.D. Luis Ángel Firpo (1988–1989)
- **Jesus Goyzueta** – C.D. Sonsonate (1975-77)
- **Miguel Seminario** – C.D. Luis Ángel Firpo (1988–1989)
- José Luis Vásquez "Camote" – Atlético Balboa (1993), Atlético Marte, C.D. Chalatenango
- Wilmar Valencia – Atletico Marte (1987)
- Cesar Larrea - Alianza (1979)
- Guillermo Vargas - Alianza (1979)
- Cesar Dinlegra – UES (1977)

=== Uruguay ===
- Fernando Currutchet – ADET (1988–1989)
- Luis Enrique Guelmo – C.D. Aguila (1987–1988), Firpo (1990–1991)
- Daniel Darío López – C.D. Aguila 1992–1993, Metapan F.C. (1991–1992)
- Hernán Fernando Sosa – Alianza F.C. 1986–1987
- Néstor Pereira – Alianza F.C. (1988–1989)
- Victor de los Santos – Alianza F.C. (1991–1992)
- Ever Mauro Jorge – Alianza F.C. (1991–1992)
- Hernán Fernando Sosa – Alianza F.C. (1993–1996)
- Washington Leonardo Rodríguez – Alianza F.C. (1995–1996)
- Carlos Reyes – Alianza F.C. (1985–1987)
- **Julio César Cortés** – Alianza F.C. (1975)
- Claudio Ciccia – Alianza F.C. (1996–1998)
- Rubén Alonso – Alianza F.C., Fuerte San Francisco, Apaneca, C.D. Sonsonate, ADET, C.D. Municipal Limeño
- Richard Raffo – Apaneca (1993–1994)
- **Alejandro Larrea** – Atlético Marte (1994–1996)
- Jose Mario Figueroa Viscarret – Atlético Marte (1986–1987)
- José Luis González – Atletico Marte (1986–1987)
- Eduardo Lamparelli – Atletico Marte (1989–1990)
- **Raúl Esnal** – Atlético Marte (1985–1987), Maestranza (1987–1988), Acajutla (1988–1989), Tiburones (1989–1990), CESSA (1990), Fuerte San Francisco (1991), Cojutepeque F.C. (1992), Apaneca (1993)
- Gustavo Faral – Alianza F.C. (1986–87, 1989–1990), C.D. Dragon (1990–1991), Fuerte San Francisco (1991–1992)
- Óscar Roberto Suárez – C.D. Dragon (1995–1996)
- Carlos Villarreal – C.D. Dragon (1995–1996), C.D. FAS (1996–1997)
- Diego Aguirre – C.D. FAS (1996)
- Ademar Benítez – C.D. FAS (1986–1987)
- Héctor Cedrés – C.D. FAS (1987–1989)
- Robert Brittes – C.D. FAS (1988–1989)
- Luis Heiman – C.D. FAS (1988–1990)
- Carlos Álvarez – C.D. FAS (1989–1990)
- Daniel Uberti – Metpan F.C. (1987), C.D. FAS (1990–1992), Atlético Marte (1996), Firpo (1997)
- Héctor Mario Molina – C.D. FAS(1991–1992)
- Gustavo Lucas – C.D. FAS (1991–1992)
- Rubén Baeque – C.D. FAS (1992–1993)
- Mauricio Silvera – C.D. FAS (1992–1993)
- Jorge Mocecchi – C.D. FAS (1995–1997)
- Julio Cesar Tejeda – C.D. FAS (1987–1988), Atletico Marte (1989), Tiburones (1992)
- José Jaureguiberry- C.D. FAS (1987)
- Eduardo Rinaldi – C.D. FAS (1989)
- Daniel Lopez – C.D. FAS (19
- Luis Carlos Sánchez – C.D. FAS (1996–1997)
- Luis Ernesto Sosa – C.D. Luis Ángel Firpo (1992–1993)
- Enrique Washington Olivera – C.D. Luis Ángel Firpo (1988–1991)
- Víctor Pereira – UES (1965–1966)
- Clemente Gusso – CESSA (1986–1988)
- Raúl "Canario" Avellaneda – UES (1965–1966)
- Rubén Filomeno – UES (1965–1966)
- Leonel Conde – C.D. FAS (1966–67)
- Jorge Laclau - Santiagueno (1979)
- Roberto Castelli - Juventud Olímpica
- Ademar Saccone – Atletico Marte (1966)
- Santos Claudio Gonzalez - Platense (1976)
- Julio Rodriguez Silvera - Aguila (1978)
- Angel Roldan - Dragon (1978)
- Gregorio Silva - Aguila (1976), Santiagueno (1978-79)
- Miguel del Rio - Metpan F.C. (1987)
- Ruben Calixtro Sosa - Metpan F.C. (1987)
- Roberto Fernandez - Juventud Olímpica (1974-75)

== North & Central America, Caribbean – CONCACAF ==
=== Costa Rica ===
- Luis Águila ‘Tapita’ Aguilar – FAS
- Ernesto Aldana – FAS (1965–66)
- Walter Rubén Aldana – FAS
- Gerardo Alfaro - Once Municipal (1965)
- Oscar Jimenez Araya – Dragob
- **Javier Astúa** - Municipal Limeño (1996)
- Enrique Barboza - Alianza F.C.
- **Álvaro Cascante Barquero'** – Aguila (1964-65), Leones FC (1966), Sonsonate (1968-69)
- Carlos Bonilla – Once Municipal (1948–1949)
- **Victor Calvo** – UES (1974-75)
- Oswaldo Chávez – Once Municipal (1948–1949)
- **Pedro Cubillo** – Dragon, Alianza F.C.
- Carl Davis - Tiburones (1995)
- Henry Duarte - Metapan F.C. (1988)
- **Guillermo Elizondio** - Aguila (1965)
- Rodrigo Gallardo - Atlante (1965)
- Tarcisio Guillen – Agui;a (1964)
- **Floyd Guthrie** – Firpo (1996)
- **Didier Gutiérrez** – Municipal Limeno(1972–1976)
- **Juan Alberto Gutiérrez** – Alianza F.C. (1975–1976)
- Jairo Hernandez – Dragon
- Raúl Lizano Pato – Aguila (1959–1968)
- **Claudio Jara** – Alianza F.C. (1995)
- **Justiniano Fernando Jimenez** – Aguila (1958–1961), FAS (1962)
- **Martín Jiménez** – Alianza F.C. , Municipal Limeno
- Jose Manuel Lopez Pecas - Once Municipal (1965)
- Juan José ‘Turrialbeño’ López – FAS
- Juan Manuel Lopez - Once Municipal (1965)
- **Carlos Marín** “Cayaca” – C.D. FAS (1965–1969)
- Lester Marzon – Firpo (1996)
- Angel Mena – Aguila (1964)
- Jorge Gómez McCarthy – Platense (1978–1979)
- **Fernando Montero** – Platense (1975)
- Guillermo Orozco – FAS
- **Allan Oviedo** – C.D. FAS (1996)
- **Eduardo Tanque Ramirez** – Alianza F.C. (1991–1993)
- Carlos Luis Rodríguez – Municipal Limeno (1997–1998)
- **Ramon "mon" Rodriguez** – Dragon (1958-1959) , Aguila (1960) , Firpo (1961-1962)
- **Tarcisio Rodriguez** - Once Municipal (1965)
- Anarias Ruiz - Atlante (1965)
- **Roy Sáenz** – UES (1974-75)
- Adonay Salas – FAS (1964–1965), Once Municipal (1965), C.D. Sonsonate (1967–1968), Alianza (1969)
- Willian Salas - Once Municipal (1965)
- Gerardo Salazar – FAS (1968)
- **William Fisher Salgado**; - Tapachulteca (1975-76), Firpo (1987)
- Sergio Benavides Sánchez – Municipal Limeno (1995–1996)
- Manuel Pena Selva - Dragon
- **Gilbert Solano** – FAS (1997-1998)
- **José Luis Soto** – Atlético Marte (1965), FAS (1962–1963)
- Guido Elvido Alvarado Ulloa – Alianza F.C. (1965–1968)
- Cristian Vactory – Municipal Limeno
- **Guillermo Valenciano** - UES (1966)
- **José Elías Valenciano** – UES (1968)
- Jose Ruiz Vargas - Atletico Marte ()
- Miguel Antonio Segura Vargas – Dragon (1995–1996), Municipal Limeno (1994)
- Onix Vargas – FAS
- Guillermo Otarola Vega – Aguila (1966)
- **Walter Pearson Wilson** – Aguila (1965-66, 1968)
- Ramón Omar Zumbado – Atlético Marte, La Constancia, Atlante, FAS

=== Domican ===
- Wilkenson Saint Louis Pierre - Atletico Marte

=== Grenada ===
- **Keith Fletcher** – C.D. Águila (1996–1997)

=== Guatemala ===
- Joaquin Álvarez – Once Lobos (1986–1987)
- La Masoca Bobadilla - UCA (1985)
- Jose Medrano Castillo - Aguila
- Carlos Coyoy – Once Lobos (1985)
- **Erwin Donis** – Once Lobos (1986–1987)
- **Jorge Fernández** "Chana" – Once Lobos (1983), Metapan F.C. (1986–1987)
- Rogelio Flores – Aguila (1981–1983), FAS (1983, 1988)
- **Tomás Gamboa** – Municipal Limeno, ADLER (1965), FAS (1973)
- Hermes Chaz Garcia - Municipal Limeno (1974)
- Vitalino García – Once Lobos (1987–1988)
- Carlos Guerra - FAS (1955–56)
- Alfredo McNish - Juventud Olimpica (1969)
- Mynor Mendez - Metapan FC
- Carlos Alberto Mijangos – Chalatenango (1978=1979), Platense (1975–1978), UES (1977)
- **Roberto Montepeque** – FAS (1987–1988)
- Luis Morales – FAS (1983)
- **Adán Paniagua** – Aguila (1985), Metapan F.C. (1986–1987)
- Julio Rubén Flecha Paredes – Independiente (1978–1980)
- **Hugo Peña** – FAS (1965), UES (1966)
- **Selvin Pennant** - Independiente
- **Byron Pérez** – Once Lobos (1983)
- **Miguel Ángel Pérez** – FAS (1986–1987)
- **Ricardo Piccinini** – Aguila
- **Julio Adán de la Roca** – Chalatenango (1985)
- **Julio Rodas** – FAS (1995–1996)
- Carlos Enrique Rojas - Municipal Limeno (1972)
- **Oscar Sanchez "La Coneja"** – Aguila
- Peter Sandoval – Once Lobos (1985)
- **Pedro Segura** - FAS
- D Jerry Slusher - ADLER
- **David Stokes** - ADLER (1971)
- Ricardo Tadeo - Aguila (1968), Alianza (1970-71)
- **Gabriel Urriola** – Atlético Marte (1956–1957)
- Bobby White – LA Firpo (1975–1976)
- **Roberto Zúñiga** – UES (1966), ADLER (1968)

=== Haiti ===
- Jean Louis Frank Girantz – Municipal Limeno (1995–1996)

=== Honduras ===
- Juan Ramon Lagos – Once Municipal
- **Rudy Williams** – ADET (1994–1995)
- **Ciro Paulino Castillo** – ADET (1997–1998)
- **Julio César Arzú** – ADET (1983)
- Karl Roland – Baygon-ADET
- Mario Rosa Chávez – Atletico Marte (1955–1957)
- Jorge Armando "Tin" Martinez + – ADET (1996–1997), Aguila, C.D. Santa Clara
- **Ramón Maradiaga** "Primitivo" – Independiente (1983), Alianza (1985) Aguila (1986–1988)
- Juan Ramon Castro – Aguila (1994–1995)
- Patrocinio Sierra – Alianza (1988–1989)
- Pedro Cubillo – Alianza (1996–1997)
- Henry Guevara – Cojutepeque F.C. (1994–1995)
- Iván Nolasco – Cojutepeque F.C. (1994–1995), Limeno (1995–1996)
- Miguel "Gallo" Mariano – El Roble (1995–1996), FAS
- Germán Pérez – Fuerte San Francisco (1991–1992), El Roble (1994–1996)
- Cipriano Dueñas – Dragon (1990–1991)
- Carlos Ruiz – Dragon (1995–1996)
- Héctor Amaya Fernández – Dragon (1999)
- **Belarmino Rivera** – FAS (1986–1987)
- Danilo Galindo – FAS(1987), Fuerte San Francisco (1991–1992)
- Jorge Martínez Ogaldes – Fuerte San Francisco (1991–1993), Limeno, El Roble (1995–1996)
- Nelín Pastore – Fuerte San Francisco (1992–1993)
- Tomás Rochez – Metapan F.C. (1988–1989)
- Raúl Centeno Gamboa – LA Firpo (1984), Metapan F.C. (1988–1989)
- Domingo Drummond – Metapan F.C. (1988–1989)×
- Edwin Geovanny Castro – Limeno (1993–1994)
- Jorge Ernesto Pineda – Limeno (1995–1996)
- Germán Rodríguez – Limeno (1995–1998)
- Idelfonso Mejía Bonilla – Limeno
- Francisco Javier Flores – Tiburones (1992–1995)
- **Gilberto Yearwood** – ADET (1992–1993)
- Manuel Larios - C.D. Aguila (1959-1960)
- Victor Zuniga - Aguila (1994–1995)
- Miguel Angel Lanza Breve - Agave (1982)
- Daniel Sambula - Agave (1982)
- Danilo Galindo – Fuerte San Francisco (1991-1992)
- Nahum Espinoza – Fuerte San Francisco (1991-1992)
- Luis Chito Reyes – Independiente (1984)
- Mario Bonilla Pacharaca - UES (1986)
- Miguel Antonio Mathews - Aguila (1982-83)
- Roger Chavarria - TBD
- Omar Ascencio Castaneda - Acatluja
- Daniel Yanez – Dragon (1989-1990)
- Augusto Alvarez – Dragon (1966)
- Javier Padilla - El Roble (1994)
- Martin Garcia - El Roble (1995)
- Juan Cruz Murillo – LA Firpo (1984)

=== Mexico ===
- **Manuel Camacho** – Atlético Marte
- Nahún Corro Bazan – C.D. Aguila (1987)
- Emmanuel Valle, Dalorso – C.D. Aguila (1993–1994)
- Álex López Buenfil – Atlético Marte

=== Netherlands Antilles ===
- **Roland Albert Martell** - Alianza F.C.

=== Nicaragua ===
- **Rudi Sobalvarro Rivera** – C.D. Aguila (1968-69)
- **Rodolfo Orellana Castro** (Fito Castro) – C.D. FAS (1963–1965)
- **Roger Mayorga** – C.D. Águila (1969-71)

=== Panama ===
- **Erick Ortega** – Alianza F.C. (1988–1989), C.D. FAS (1990–1991), Fuerte San Francisco (1992–1993)
- **José Alfredo Poyatos** – Cojutepeque F.C. (1988–1989),(1991–1993)
- **Rubén Guevara** – Cojutepeque F.C. (1987–1989), Tiburones
- **René Mendieta** – Cojutepeque F.C. (1987–1989)
- Carlos Maldonado – Cojutepeque F.C. (1989–1990)
- **Percival Piggott** – Cojutepeque F.C. (1988–1990), (1992–1993)
- Patricio "Patrigol" Guevara – Cojutepeque F.C. (1991–1992)
- Noel Gutiérrez – Cojutepeque F.C. (1991–1992)
- Agustín Sánchez – UES (1978–1979)
- Daniel Montilla – UES (1978–1979)
- Jorge Méndez – UES (1978–1979), Santiagueno (1979)
- **Franklin“Morocho” Delgado** – Tiburones (1992–1993), Municipal Limeno (1994–1995)
- Néstor Hernández Polo – UES (1974)
- **Luis Ernesto Tapia** – Atlético Marte (1970–1971), C.D. Juventud Olímpica Metalio (1972–1974), Alianza F.C. (1963–1970)
- Radamés Oriel Avila – Municipal Limeno (1994–1995)
- Erick Martinez – Municipal Limeno (1994–1995)
- Gaspar Romero - C.D. Aguila (1968)
- Guillermo Bunting – UES
- Mauricio Perez - C.D. Juventud Olímpica Metalio
- Ignacio Torres - Municipal Limeno (1972)

=== United States ===
- **Hugo Pérez** – C.D. FAS (1994–1996)
- **David Quezada** – C.D. FAS (1996–1997)
- **Robert Weavert** - Alianza F.C.

== Europe – UEFA ==
=== Germany ===
- Rugvao Leichiz – C.D. Aguila (1998)

=== Switzerland ===
- Juan Pablo Bolens - Leones de Sonsonate (1951–53)

=== Yugoslavia ===
- Dragan Kovačević – C.D. Águila (1997)
- Vladimir Avramović – C.D. Águila (1997)
