= 2011 Copa Chile =

Tournament details
- Country: Chile
- Teams: 75

Final positions
- Champions: Universidad Católica
- Runners-up: Magallanes

Tournament statistics
- Top goal scorer(s): Paolo Frangipane, Claudio Latorre (7 goals)

The 2011 Copa Chile was the 32nd edition of the Copa Chile, the country's national cup tournament. The competition started on May 11, 2011 with the preliminary rounds and concluded on November 16, 2011 with the second leg of the final. The winner qualified for the 2012 Copa Sudamericana. A new format was used for the teams that was created by the Chilean Leandro A. Shara

== Schedule ==
Round	Date
Preliminary round	May 11, 2011; May 18, 2011
First round	May 25, 2011; June 1, 2011
Second round	June 8, 2011; June 15, 2011
Third round	June 19, 2011; August 3, 2011
Quarterfinals	August 31, 2011; September 4, 2011
Semifinals	October 5, 2011; October 13, 2011
Final	November 9, 2011; November 16, 2011

== Teams ==
A total 76 clubs were accepted for the competition; one club, Juventud Puente Alto, folded before the fixtures were released, leaving 75 clubs in the draw. The teams for this edition were from the Primera Division, Primera B, Tercera Division, Tercera B, regional amateur club champions, and selected amateur teams.

=== Primera División ===
- Audax Italiano
- Cobreloa
- Cobresal
- Colo-Colo
- Huachipato
- Deportes Iquique
- Deportes La Serena
- Ñublense
- O'Higgins
- Palestino
- Santiago Morning
- Santiago Wanderers
- Unión Española
- Unión La Calera
- Unión San Felipe
- Universidad Católica
- Universidad de Chile
- Universidad de Concepción

=== Primera B ===
- Coquimbo Unido
- Curicó Unido
- Deportes Antofagasta
- Deportes Concepción
- Deportes Copiapó
- Deportes Puerto Montt
- Everton
- Lota Schwager
- Naval
- Magallanes
- Rangers
- San Luis
- San Marcos de Arica
- Unión Temuco

=== Tercera División ===
- Deportivo Barnechea
- Deportes Colchagua
- Deportes Ovalle
- Deportes Quilicura
- Deportes Melipilla
- Deportes Temuco
- Fernández Vial
- Iberia
- Municipal La Pintana
- Municipal Mejillones
- Provincial Osorno
- Provincial Talagante
- Pudahuel Barrancas
- San Antonio Unido
- Trasandino
- Unión Santa María

=== Tercera B ===
- Academia Quilpué
- Defensor Casablanca
- Deportes Cerro Navia
- Enfoque de Rancagua
- Ferroviarios
- General Velásquez
- Independiente de Cauquenes
- Lautaro de Buin
- Linares Unido
- Luis Matte Larraín
- Corporación Peñalolén
- Deportivo Purranque
- Deportes Rengo
- Deportes Santa Cruz
- Sportverein Jugendland
- Deportes Valdivia

=== Regional teams ===
- Araucanía - Dante (Nueva Imperial)
- Atacama - Selección San Pedro de Atacama
- Atacama - Juventud Hospital (Chañaral)
- Biobío - Estrella del Mar (Lota)
- Los Lagos - Quesos Kümey (Río Negro)
- Los Lagos - José Miguel Carrera (Purranque)
- Los Ríos - Unión Wanderers (Valdivia)
- Maule - Favorita (Lontué)
- O'Higgins - Deportes Paniahue (Santa Cruz)
- Tarapacá - Municipal Pozo Almonte
- Valparaíso - Balmaceda (San Antonio)

== First round ==
This round comprised the 2011 Tercera División teams, one regional amateur champion, one invitee amateur team, and the eight winners of the preliminary round.

Team 1	Agg.	Team 2	1st leg	2nd leg
Selección San Pedro de Atacama	1–13	Municipal Mejillones	0–4	1–9
Deportivo Barnechea	6–1	Deportes Quilicura	1–0	5–1
Deportes Ovalle	4–1	Trasandino	2–0	2–1
Provincial Talagante	2–2 (4-5p)	Pudahuel Barrancas	1–1	1–1
Deportes Melipilla	1–5	San Antonio Unido	0–1	1–4
Iberia	3–1	Unión Santa María	0–1	3–0
Fernández Vial	2–2 (2-4p)	Deportes Temuco	1–1	1–1
Deportes Cerro Navia	2–5	Corporación Peñalolén	1–2	1–3
Defensor Casablanca	2–4	Lautaro de Buin	2–2	0–2
Deportes Valdivia	3–5	Linares Unido	1–2	2–3
Municipal La Pintana	5–5 (4-2p)	Deportes Colchagua	4–4	1–1
Deportes Santa Cruz	5–6	Enfoque de Rancagua	2–3	3–3
Unión Wanderers (Valdivia)	3–5	Provincial Osorno	2–0	1–5

== Second round ==
The second round was the beginning of the competition for professional teams. This round comprised the winners of the first round, the 2011 Primera B teams and 11 Regional Champions amateur teams.

Team 1	Agg.	Team 2	1st leg	2nd leg
Deportes Ovalle	0–4	Coquimbo Unido	0–3	0–1
Deportivo Barnechea	1–1 (4-5p)	Magallanes	0–0	1–1
Estrella del Mar (Lota)	0–10	Deportes Concepción	0–6	0–4
Favorita (Lontué)	2–7	Deportes Temuco	0–2	2–5
Pudahuel Barrancas	1–6	Rangers	1–2	0–4
San Antonio Unido	1–4	Everton	0–1	1–3
Enfoque de Rancagua	4–4 (3-2p)	Iberia	0–1	4–3
Municipal Mejillones	3–3 (5-4p)	Deportes Antofagasta	1–0	2–3
Juventud Hospital (Chañaral)	0–6	Deportes Copiapó	0–1	0–5
Municipal Pozo Almonte	2–6	San Marcos de Arica	2–2	0–4
Corporación Peñalolén	1–7	Municipal La Pintana	0–1	1–6
Balmaceda (San Antonio)	1–6	San Luis	0–3	1–3
Lautaro de Buin	2–10	Curicó Unido	2–3	0–7
Deportes Paniahue (Santa Cruz)	0–2	Lota Schwager	0–2	0–0
Linares Unido	5–7	Naval	4–4	1–3
Dante (Nueva Imperial)	0–9	Unión Temuco	0–2	0–7
José Miguel Carrera (Purranque)	1–2	Deportes Puerto Montt	1–1	0–1
Quesos Kümey (Río Negro)	3–3 (5-3p)	Provincial Osorno	3–1	0–2

== Third round ==
The third round marked the beginning of the competition for Primera División teams. This round comprised the winners of the second round and the 2011 Primera División teams. Each team played six games against three rivals. The best 8 teams advanced to the next round.

This round was based on the format called Leandro Shara © System, whose creation and property corresponds to Leandro A. Shara, which is duly registered in his name in the Department of Intellectual Rights, in the Intellectual Property Registry of the Republic of Chile. Under this modality the development of the round was as follows:

=== First & Fourth matchdays ===
DLSE	2-0	CSAL	1-0
AUDI	4-1	PALE	1-2
DIQU	1-0	CLOA	0-2
UCON	2-1	HUAC	3-1
DCOP	1-0	COQU	2-1
RANG	0-1	CURI	1-2
SWAN	3-1	UCAL	1-0
MEJI	1-0	SMAR	2-1
LPIN	0-3	UESP	7-0
DTEM	0-0	UTEM	3-0
QKUM	0-1	DPMO	3-1
SMOR	1-0	USFE	1-1
UCAT	2-0	NAVA	0-2
DCON	1-2	ÑUBL	0-2
EVER	1-1	SLUI	1-1
UCHI	0-2	MAGA	1-1
OHIG	2-2	ENFO	0-3
LSCH	2-1	COLO	4-1

=== Second and Fifth matchdays ===
COLO	0-3	UCAT	0-0
PALE	1-2	SMOR	1-0
USFE	0-1	UCHI	1-0
LSCH	2-2	DCON	2-0
UTEM	5-1	QKUM	1-2
ÑUBL	1-0	NAVA	0-1
DPMO	1-2	HUAC	8-0
OHIG	1-1	AUDI	4-1
SMAR	0-0	DIQU	1-1
CLOA	2-2	MEJI	1-1
DCOP	0-2	CSAL	2-1
COQU	1-1	DLSE	4-2
UCAL	1-0	SLUI	0-0
SWAN	0-2	EVER	0-0
UESP	2-0	CURI	0-2
LPIN	0-4	MAGA	3-1
ENFO	1-3	RANG	6-1
UCON	4-2	DTEM	0-0

=== Third and Sixth matchdays ===
UCAT	0-0	ÑUBL	0-2
UCHI	2-1	UESP	0-1
QKUM	1-4	UCON	3-0
EVER	0-0	UCAL	2-2
MAGA	0-0	USFE	1-2
SMAR	1-2	CLOA	0-2
CSAL	3-1	COQU	3-2
RANG	1-1	PALE	3-3
DLSE	1-0	DCOP	1-3
SMOR	2-1	LPIN	0-1
HUAC	2-1	UTEM	0-2
ENFO	1-4	AUDI	4-0
SWAN	1-2	SLUI	0-1
MEJI	0-1	DIQU	4-1
DTEM	1-2	DPMO	1-4
CURI	1-0	OHIG	0-1
NAVA	2-2	LSCH	1-0
DCON	1-1	COLO	3-2

=== Third Round Table ===
Pos	Team	Pts	GD
1	Audax Italiano	16	+14
2	Santiago Morning	16	+5
3	Huachipato	15	+13
4	Magallanes	14	+9
5	Universidad Católica	14	+9
6	Deportes Iquique	14	+7
7	Universidad de Concepción	13	+7
8	Deportes La Serena	13	+6
9	Universidad de Chile	13	+2
10	Unión Española	12	+12
11	Cobresal	12	+3
12	Rangers	11	+7
13	Unión Temuco	10	+5
14	Ñublense	10	-1
15	Unión La Calera	9	0
16	Curicó Unido	9	-2
17	Deportes Puerto Montt	9	-8
18	Deportes Concepción	8	+2

Pos	Team	Pts	GD
19	Everton	8	+2
20	San Marcos de Arica	8	+1
21	Colo-Colo	8	0
22	Lota Schwager	8	-3
23	Santiago Wanderers	7	-1
24	Coquimbo Unido	7	-3
25	San Luis	6	-1
26	O'Higgins	5	-2
27	Deportes Temuco	5	-3
28	Municipal Mejillones	5	-4
29	Cobreloa	5	-4
30	Deportes Copiapó	3	-6
31	Unión San Felipe	2	-4
32	Palestino	2	-6
33	Naval	1	-7
34	Enfoque de Rancagua	1	-17
35	Quesos Kümey (Río Negro)	0	-14
36	Municipal La Pintana	0	-18

== Quarterfinals ==
Team 1	Agg.	Team 2	1st leg	2nd leg
Magallanes	3–1	Santiago Morning	0–1	3–0
Universidad Católica	3–3 (4-2p)	Audax Italiano	2–0	1–3
Universidad de Concepción	8–2	Huachipato	3–0*	5–2
Deportes La Serena	3–1	Deportes Iquique	2–1	1–0

* The first leg of the tie were awarded 3–0 to U. de Concepción after Huachipato was found to have fielded six foreign players.

== Semifinals ==
October 5, 2011

Deportes La Serena	0 – 1	Magallanes
		Cisternas 65'

Estadio La Portada, La Serena
Attendance: 4,742
Referee: R. De la Rosa

October 9, 2011

Universidad de Concepción	0 – 1	Universidad Católica
		Mier 44'

Estadio Municipal, Concepción
Attendance: 3,868
Referee: C. Rumiano

October 9, 2011

Magallanes	3 – 0	Deportes La Serena
Latorre 62' (pen.); Cisternas 78'; Salas 83'

Estadio Santiago Bueras, Santiago
Attendance: 2,288
Referee: R. Tobar

October 13, 2011

Universidad Católica	5 – 4	Universidad de Concepción
Martínez 1'; Cereceda 3'; Carignano 13'; Mier 40'; Pizarro 42'		F. Muñoz 36', 45+1'; Aravena 39'; P. Muñoz 75'

Estadio San Carlos de Apoquindo, Santiago
Attendance: 3,156
Referee: J. Bascuñán

== Finals ==
November 9, 2011

Universidad Católica	0 – 1	Magallanes
		Cárdenas 85'

Estadio San Carlos de Apoquindo, Santiago
Attendance: 8,551
Referee: E. Gamboa

November 16, 2011

Magallanes	0 – 1	Universidad Católica
		Gazale 88'
Penalties
Cisternas (penalty scored); Cárdenas (penalty missed); Latorre (penalty scored); Aguilera (penalty missed)	2 – 4	(penalty missed) Mirosevic; (penalty scored) Calandria; (penalty scored) Meneses; (penalty scored) Gutiérrez; (penalty scored) Cereceda

Estadio Santa Laura, Santiago
Attendance: 9,040
Referee: J. Bascuñán

Copa Chile
2011 Champion
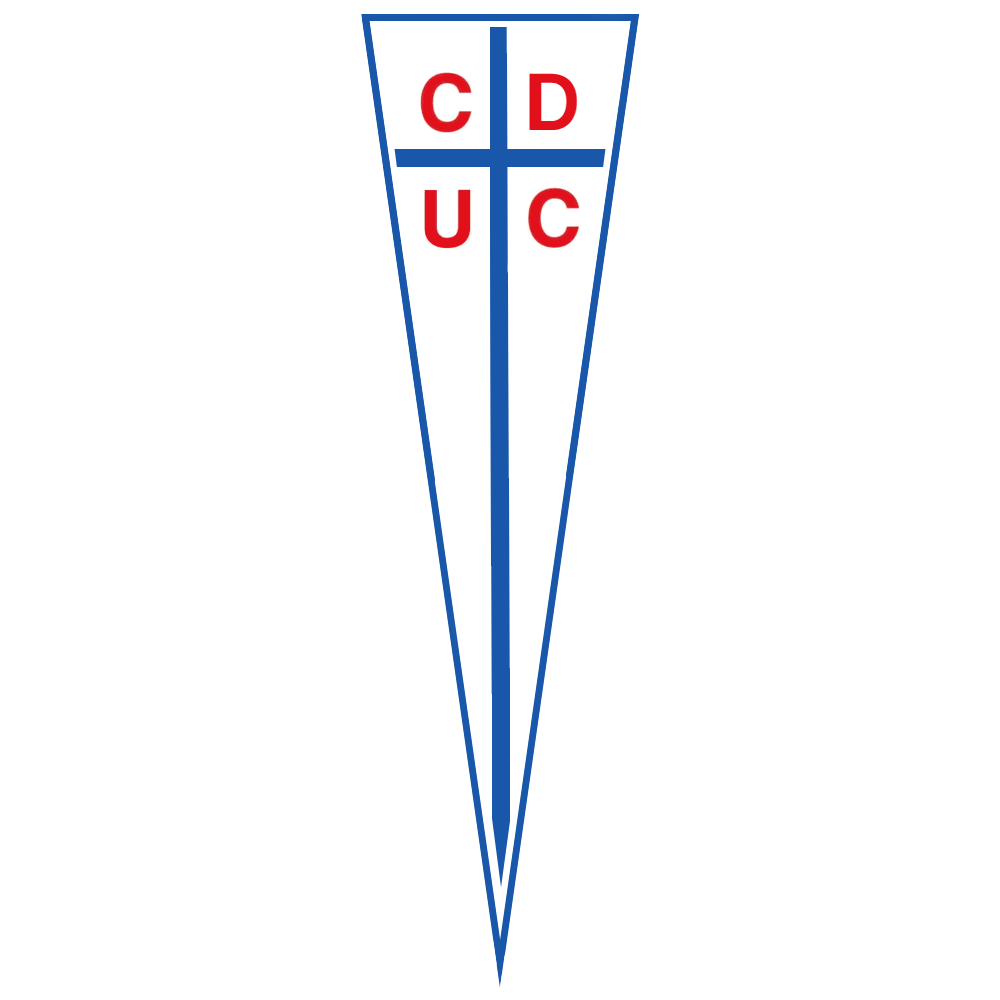
U. Católica
4th Title

== Top goalscorers ==
Pos	Name	Club	Goals
1	(Argentina) Paolo Frangipane	Huachipato	7
1	(Chile) Claudio Latorre	Magallanes	7
3	(Paraguay) Jaison Ibarrola	D. Concepción	6
3	(Chile) Rodrigo Pereira	Curicó U.	6
3	(Chile) Cristian Canio	Audax I.	6
