= Barrientos =

Barrientos (Spanish pronunciation: [baˈrjentos]) is a Spanish surname. Notable people with the surname include:

== Politicians and scholars ==
- Andrea Barrientos (born 1989), Bolivian politician, businesswoman and former singer-songwriter
- Baltasar Alamos de Barrientos (1555–1640), Spanish scholar
- Gonzalo Barrientos (born 1941), Democratic member of the Texas Senate from 1985 to 2007
- Lope de Barrientos (1382–1469), clergyman and statesman of the Spanish Crown of Castile
- Manuel Espino Barrientos (born 1959), president of the National Action Party (PAN) of Mexico
- Nora Barrientos (born 1960), Chilean politician
- René Barrientos (1919–1969), president of Bolivia from 1964 to 1966 and 1966 to 1969
- Simone Barrientos (born 1963), German politician

== Sportspeople ==
- Armando Barrientos (1906–1998), Cuban fencer
- Claudio Barrientos (1936–1982), Chilean boxer
- Felipe Barrientos (born 1984), Chilean handball player
- Felipe Barrientos (footballer) (born 1997), Chilean footballer
- Felix Barrientos (born 1967), Filipino tennis player
- Fernando Barrientos (born 1991), Argentine footballer
- Hamlet Barrientos (born 1978), Bolivian footballer
- Henry Barrientos (born 1966), Chilean footballer and manager
- Hernando Barrientos (born 1953), Colombian sports shooter
- Hugo Barrientos (born 1977), Argentine footballer
- Isaac Barrientos (1966–1987), Puerto Rican boxer
- Jaime Barrientos (born 1980), Chilean footballer and manager.
- Jean Barrientos (born 1990), Uruguayan footballer
- José Barrientos (1904–1945), Cuban sprinter
- Juan Manuel Barrientos (born 1982), Argentine footballer
- Marcelo Barrientos (born 1970), Chilean long-distance runner.
- Nicolás Barrientos (born 1987), Colombian tennis player
- Pablo Barrientos (born 1985), Argentine footballer
- Rafael Ernesto Barrientos (born 1979), Salvadoran footballer
- Rene Barrientos (born 1943), Filipino boxer
- Rudy Barrientos (born 1999), Guatemalan footballer
- Sebastián Barrientos (born 1989), Chilean footballer
- Sergio Barrientos (born 1986), Colombian chess player
- Wilfredo Barrientos (born 1946), Chilean footballer
- Yashira Barrientos (born 1994), Mexican footballer

== Entertainment ==
- Adriana Barrientos (born 1980), Chilean model, dancer and television personality
- Jennifer Barrientos, Miss Universe pageant representative for the Philippines
- Marco Barrientos (born 1963), Mexican Christian musician
- Maria Barrientos (1883–1946), Spanish opera singer
- Mauricio Barrientos (born 1977), Mexican actor
- Paola Barrientos (born 1975), Argentine actress
- Rafael Barrientos (musician) (1919–2008), Salvadoran musician

== Others ==
- Margarita Barrientos, Argentine activist
