= List of football stadiums in Chile =

The following is a list of football stadiums in Chile, ordered by capacity.

== Current stadiums ==
#	Image	Stadium	Capacity	City	Home team(s)
1		Estadio Nacional Julio Martínez Prádanos	48,745	Santiago	Chile national football team Universidad de Chile
2		Monumental David Arellano	47,000	Santiago	Colo Colo
3		Ester Roa	30,448	Concepción	Deportes Concepción Universidad de Concepción Fernández Vial
4		Sausalito	23,423	Viña del Mar	Everton
5		Regional de Antofagasta	21,178	Antofagasta	Deportes Antofagasta
6		Elías Figueroa Brander	20,575	Valparaíso	Santiago Wanderers
7		Claro Arena	20,249	Santiago	Universidad Católica
8		Santa Laura Universidad SEK	19,887	Santiago	Unión Española
9		Francisco Sánchez Rumoroso	18,750	Coquimbo	Coquimbo Unido
10		Germán Becker	18,413	Temuco	Deportes Temuco
11		La Portada	18,243	La Serena	La Serena
12		Fiscal de Talca	16,070	Talca	Rangers de Talca
13		Tierra de Campeones	13,171	Iquique	Deportes Iquique
14		El Teniente	12,476	Rancagua	O'Higgins
15		Zorros del Desierto	12,346	Calama	Cobreloa
16		Bicentenario Municipal de La Florida	12,000	Santiago	Audax Italiano
17		Nelson Oyarzún Arenas	12,000	Chillán	Ñublense
18		La Granja	12,000	Curicó	Curicó Unido
19		El Cobre	11,240	El Salvador	Cobresal
20		Estadio CAP	10,500	Talcahuano	Huachipato
21		Regional Chinquihue	10,000	Puerto Montt	Deportes Puerto Montt
22		Rubén Marcos Peralta	10,000	Osorno	Provincial Osorno
23		Municipal de San Felipe	10,000	San Felipe	Unión San Felipe
24		Carlos Dittborn	9,746	Arica	San Marcos de Arica
25		Nicolás Chahuán Nazar	9,200	La Calera	Unión La Calera
26		Luis Valenzuela Hermosilla	8,000	Copiapó	Deportes Copiapó
27		Municipal de La Cisterna	8,000	Santiago	Palestino
28		Lucio Fariña Fernández	7,680	Quillota	San Luis
29		El Morro	7,000	Talcahuano	Naval
30		Fiscal Tucapel Bustamante	7,000	Linares	Deportes Linares
31		Roberto Bravo Santibáñez	6,500	Melipilla	Deportes Melipilla
32		Municipal de La Pintana	6,000	Santiago	Santiago Morning Deportes Pintana
33		Joaquín Muñoz García	6,000	Santa Cruz	Deportes Santa Cruz
34		Jorge Silva Valenzuela	5,900	San Fernando	CD Colchagua
35		Federico Schwager	5,700	Coronel	Lota Schwager
36		Diaguita	5,160	Ovalle	Deportes Ovalle Provincial Ovalle
37		Parque Municipal	5,000	Valdivia	Deportes Valdivia
38		Olegario Henríquez	5,000	San Antonio	San Antonio Unido
39		Nelson Rojas	5,000	Vallenar	Deportes Vallenar
40		Fiscal Manuel Moya Medel	5,000	Cauquenes	Independiente de Cauquenes
41		Ascanio Cortés	5,000	Tocopilla	Deportes Tocopilla
42		Monumental Arístides Bahamondes	5,000	Chillán Viejo	Ñublense CD Chillán Viejo
43		Antonio Ríspoli Díaz	4,500	Punta Arenas	CF Punta Arenas
44		Municipal de Los Ángeles	4,150	Los Ángeles	Deportes Iberia
45		Alberto Larraguibel Morales	4,000	Angol	Malleco Unido
46		Santiago Bueras	4,000	Santiago	Santiago Morning Cultural Maipú
47		Félix Gallardo	4,000	Valdivia	Deportes Valdivia
48		Parque Juan López	4,000	Antofagasta	Deportes Antofagasta
49		Luis Becerra Constanzo	4,000	Calama	Cobreloa
50		La Pampilla	4,000	Coquimbo	Coquimbo Unido
51		Manuel Rojas del Río	4,000	Colina	Deportes Colina
52		Municipal de Castro	4,000	Castro, Chiloé Island	CF Castro Local teams
53		Municipal Carlos Vogel Meyer	4,000	La Unión	Provincial Ranco
54		O'Higgins de Valparaíso	4,000	Valparaíso	Santiago Wanderers (Women's); Local teams
55		Lautaro	3,700	Buin	Lautaro de Buin
56		Municipal de San Joaquín	3,515	Santiago	Real Juventud San Joaquín Rodelindo Román
57		Luis Navarro Avilés	3,500	San Bernardo	Magallanes San Bernardo Unido
58		Estadio USACH	3,500	Santiago	Santiago Morning University of Santiago
59		Ítalo Composto Scarpatti	3,500	Villa Alemana	Iván Mayo
60		Silas Smith	3,500	San Nicolás	Local teams
61		Regional de Los Andes	3,300	Los Andes	Trasandino de Los Andes
62		Cavancha	3,300	Iquique	Deportes Iquique
63		Augusto Rodríguez	3,000	San Vicente de Tagua Tagua	General Velásquez
64		Guillermo Guzmán Díaz	3,000	Rengo	Deportes Rengo
65		Ángel Navarrete Candia	3,000	Limache	Deportes Limache
66		Gustavo Ocaranza	3,000	Limache	Deportes Limache
67		Atlético Municipal	3,000	Concón	Concón National
68		Municipal de Salamanca	3,000	Salamanca	Brujas de Salamanca
69		Matías Vidal Pérez	3,000	Villarrica	Deportivo Pilmahue
70		Municipal de Puente Alto	3,000	Puente Alto	Municipal Puente Alto; Luis Matte Larraín; Juventud Puente Alto
71		Municipal de Peñalolén	3,000	Santiago	Corporación Peñalolén; Santiago Morning Women's
72		Luis Figueroa Riquelme	3,000	Cabrero	Comunal Cabrero
73		Raúl Erazo	3,000	Curanilahue	Lota Schwager; Local teams
74		Luis Álamos Luque	3,000	Chañaral	Deportes Copiapó; Local teams
75		La Caldera	3,000	Caldera	Deportes Copiapó; Local teams
76		Eladio Rojas	3,000	Tierra Amarilla	Deportes Copiapó; Local teams
77		Facela	3,000	Laja	Deportes Laja
78		Lucas Pacheco Toro	2,883	Talagante	Provincial Talagante
79		Municipal de Lo Barnechea	2,500	Santiago	A.C. Barnechea
80		Raúl Vargas Verdejo	2,500	Quintero	Quintero Unido
81		Municipal de Paine	2,500	Paine	Tricolor Municipal de Paine
82		Hanga Roa	2,500	Hanga Roa, Easter Island	CF Rapa Nui
83		Bernardo O'Higgins	2,200	Santiago	Santiago City FC
84		Enrique Donn Müller	2,060	Constitución	Constitución Unido
85		Leonel Sánchez	2,000	Santiago	Deportes Recoleta
86		Municipal de Molina	2,000	Molina	Curicó Unido; Local teams
87		Fernando Ross Marchessi	2,000	Cartagena	San Antonio Unido; Local teams
88		Arturo Echazarreta Larraín	1,672	Casablanca	Defensor Casablanca
89		Soinca Bata	1,500	Melipilla	Deportes Melipilla
90		Rolando Cortés Dubó	1,500	Mejillones	Municipal Mejillones

== See also ==
- List of South American stadiums by capacity
- List of association football stadiums by capacity
- List of association football stadiums by country
- List of sports venues by capacity
- List of stadiums by capacity
- Lists of stadiums
