= Manuel Baeza =

Chilean footballer

Personal information
- Full name: Manuel Hernán Baeza Cornejo
- Date of birth: 9 October 1956 (age 70)
- Place of birth: Providencia, Santiago, Chile
- Height: 1.75 m (5 ft 9 in)
- Position: Forward

Youth career
- Los Cóndores
- Magallanes

Senior career*
| Years | Team | Apps | (Gls) |
| 1975–1978 | Magallanes | | |
| 1979–1980 | Huachipato | | |
| 1981–1982 | Santiago Morning | | |
| 1983 | Regional Atacama | 24 | (12) |
| 1984 | Unión San Felipe | 21 | (6) |
| 1985–1986 | Deportes Antofagasta | | |
| 1987 | Provincial Osorno | | |
| 1987 | O'Higgins | | |
| 1988 | Santiago Wanderers | | |
| 1989 | Deportes Linares | | |
| 1989–1990 | Acajutla | | |
| 1990 | Magallanes | | |
| 1990–1991 | Deportes Arica | | |
- * Club domestic league appearances and goals

Manuel Hernán Baeza Cornejo (born 9 October 1956) is a Chilean former professional footballer who played as a forward for clubs in Chile and El Salvador.

== Career ==
Born in Santiago, Chile, as a youth player, Baeza was with club Los Cóndores from Lo Prado and Magallanes. As a professional player, he played for clubs such as Magallanes, Santiago Morning, Regional Atacama, Unión San Felipe, O'Higgins, among others.

As a player in the Segunda División, he got promotion to the top division with both Santiago Morning by becoming the runner-up in the 1982 season, and O'Higgins by winning the promotion playoffs in the 1987 season. He also became the top goalscorer in the 1987 season playing for Deportes Antofagasta, with 18 goals.

He moved to El Salvador in 1989, where he played for Acajutla.

His last club was Deportes Arica in 1991.

== Personal life ==
He was nicknamed Camión (Truck), due to his physical build.

Following his retirement, he continued playing football at amateur level in clubs such as Unión Lo Franco.

== Honours ==
- Segunda División de Chile Top Goalscorer: 1985
