= Henry Barrientos =

Chilean footballer and manager

Personal information
- Full name: Henry Ricardo Barrientos Pinto
- Date of birth: 20 April 1963 (age 63)
- Place of birth: Rancagua, Chile
- Positions: Defensive midfielder; centre-back

Team information
- Current team: Aguacatán (manager)

Youth career
- 1978–1982: O'Higgins

Senior career*
Years	Team	Apps	(Gls)
1983	O'Higgins		
1983	Chiprodal		
1984	Cultural Doñihue		
1985–1986	Tricolor Municipal		
1986	Juventud O'Higgins		
1987–1989	Católico 21 de Mayo		
1990–1991	Dragón		
1991	Verdes FC		
1991–1992	Real Estelí		
1992	UNAN Managua		
1993	Águilas de León		

Managerial career
- 1993: Águilas de León
- 1993–1994: Deportivo Usumatlán
- 1995–1996: Deportivo Carchá
- 1996–1997: Gualán
- 1997: Segunda División (GUA) (league team)
- 1997–1998: Deportivo Sanarate
- 1999: Atlético La Mesilla
- 2001: Deportivo Guastatoya
- 2006–2008: Deportivo Achuapa
- 2008–2009: Peñarol La Mesilla
- 2014–2015: Deportivo Sanarate
- 2016: Santa Lucía Cotzumalguapa
- 2016–2018: Sololá
- 2018: Quiché
- 2019–2020: Barillas
- 2020: Jacalteco
- 2021–2022: Jacalteco
- 2022–: Aguacatán
- * Club domestic league appearances and goals

Henry Ricardo Barrientos Pinto (born 20 April 1966) is a Chilean football manager and former footballer who played as a defensive midfielder and centre-back.

== Playing career ==
Barrientos came to O'Higgins youth system in 1977, coinciding with players such as Cristian Trejos and Aníbal González, and was part of the first team in the 1983 Primera División de Chile. Next, he played for Chiprodal de Graneros (1983) and Católico 21 de Mayo (1987–89) in the Chilean Cuarta División and for Cultural Doñihue (1984), Tricolor Municipal from Paine (1985–86) and Juventud O'Higgins (1986) in the Chilean Tercera División.

In 1990, he emigrated to Central America thanks to his uncle Wilfredo Barrientos. He first arrived to Honduras and next moved to Nicaragua to join Dragón. After he played for Verdes FC in Belize, Real Estelí, UNAN Managua and Águilas de León in the Nicaraguan top division. As a member of Real Estelí, he won the league title in 1991.

== Coaching career ==
With an extensive career as coach in Guatemala, he began his career performing as both player and coach of Nicaraguan club Águilas de León in 1993. After rejecting an offer to play for Deportivo San Marcos, he assumed as coach of Guatemalan club Deportivo Usumatlán in the Segunda División in the same year.

In 1997, he also led a league team from the Segunda División de Ascenso in an inter-league championship.

He has coached at all divisions of the Guatemalan football, winning league titles with Deportivo Sanarate in 1997–98 and Sololá in 2016 of the Segunda División.

He is well known as El Señor de los Ascensos (The Lord of the Promotions) due to the fact that he has got promotions with Deportivo Sanarate (1997–98, 2014–15), Peñarol La Mesilla (2008), Sololá (2017) and Quiché FC (2018).

In 2019 he coached Barillas FC.

In 2020 and 2021–22 he coached Jacalteco FC.

In June 2022, he signed with Aguacatán FC.

== Personal life ==
He is the nephew of the former professional footballers Wilfredo Barrientos and Sergio "The Doctor" Fuenzalida, who played for O'Higgins. In addition, his father served as director for the same club.

He performed as a football commentator in the TV program Dueños del balón (Ball Owners) from Antigua Sports channel.

== Honours ==
=== As player ===
Real Estelí

- Liga Primera de Nicaragua: 1991

=== As manager ===
Deportivo Sanarate

- Segunda División de Ascenso: 1997–98

Sololá

- Segunda División de Ascenso: Apertura 2016
