= Felipe Barrientos (footballer) =

Chilean footballer (born 1997)

Personal information
- Full name: Felipe Andrés Barrientos Mena
- Date of birth: 6 March 1997 (age 29)
- Place of birth: Valdivia, Chile
- Height: 1.69 m (5 ft 7 in)
- Position: Forward

Team information
- Current team: Municipal Paillaco

Youth career
- Universidad Católica

Senior career*
Years	Team	Apps	(Gls)
2015–2019	Celaya	0	(0)
2015–2016	→ Irapuato (loan)	–	(–)
2017–2018	→ Palestino (loan)	17	(2)
2019	→ Huachipato (loan)	17	(0)
2020–2021	Deportes La Serena	26	(1)
2021	Curicó Unido	14	(0)
2022–2023	Coquimbo Unido	3	(0)
2023	Deportes Puerto Montt	13	(1)
2024	Cobresal	19	(0)
2025	Rangers	16	(0)
2026–	Municipal Paillaco		

International career^{‡}
2016	Chile U20		
- * Club domestic league appearances and goals as of 27 January 2026 ‡ National team caps and goals as of 15 May 2022

Felipe Andrés Barrientos Mena (born 6 March 1997) is a Chilean professional footballer who plays as a forward for Tercera B club Municipal Paillaco.

== Club career ==
A product of Universidad Católica youth system, on second half 2015 Barrientos moved to Mexico at the age of 18 and joined Celaya in the Ascenso MX, being loaned to Irapuato in the Liga Premier. In 2017, he returned to Chile to join Palestino. After his steps for Palestino, Huachipato, Deportes La Serena and Curicó Unido, he joined Coquimbo Unido for the 2022 season.

In second half 2023, Barrientos signed with Deportes Puerto Montt in the Chilean second level. The next year, he joined Cobresal in the top level. In 2025, he joined Rangers de Talca.

== International career ==
During 2016, Barrientos was frequently called up to Chile U20. Prior to this, he was a sparring player of Chile senior team while preparing 2015 Copa América.

== Honours ==
Palestino

- Copa Chile: 2018
