= Paulo Cárdenas =

Chilean footballer (born 1988)

Personal information
- Full name: Paulo César Cárdenas Riquelme
- Date of birth: 14 January 1988 (age 38)
- Place of birth: Rancagua, Chile
- Height: 1.68 m (5 ft 6 in)
- Position: Forward

Senior career*
Years	Team	Apps	(Gls)
2006–2007	O'Higgins	3	(0)
2008	Colchagua	–	(–)
2009–2010	Trasandino	–	(–)
2011–2013	Magallanes	65	(8)
2013–2016	Querétaro	0	(0)
2013–2014	→ Unión Española (loan)	2	(0)
2013–2014	→ Unión Española B (loan)	5	(1)
2014–2015	→ Deportes La Pintana (loan)	31	(13)
2015–2016	→ Curicó Unido (loan)	9	(1)
2016–2017	San Antonio Unido	29	(4)
2017–2019	Deportes Melipilla	30	(7)
2019	Deportes Santa Cruz	12	(1)
Total		186	(35)
- * Club domestic league appearances and goals

Paulo César Cárdenas Riquelme (born 14 January 1988) is a Chilean former professional footballer who played as a forward.

== Career ==
In 2013, he signed with Mexican side Querétaro and after he was loaned to Unión Española in his country of birth.
