= Deportivo Purranque =

Chilean football club

- Full name: Club Deportivo Purranque SADP
- Nicknames: El Purra, Manciboys
- Founded: September 29, 2010
- Ground: Estadio Centenario de Purranque; Purranque, Chile
- Capacity: 1,800
- Chairman: Héctor Mancilla Coronado
- Manager: Oscar Lepe
- League: Tercera División B
- 2011: 6º Zone South
Home colours	Away colours

Club Deportivo Purranque is a Chilean Football club, their home town is Purranque, Chile. They currently play in the fourth level of Chilean football, the Tercera División B.

The club were founded in on 2010 and participated for 1 year in Tercera División B.

== Seasons played ==
- 1 season in Tercera División B

== See also ==
- Chilean football league system
