= Claudio Latorre =

Chilean footballer (born 1986)

Personal information
- Full name: Claudio Andrés Latorre Meza
- Date of birth: 8 June 1986 (age 40)
- Place of birth: Santiago, Chile
- Height: 1.83 m (6 ft 0 in)
- Position: Striker

Senior career*
Years	Team	Apps	(Gls)
2005–2007	Unión Española	12	(1)
2008	Deportes Puerto Montt	15	(2)
2009	Deportes Melipilla	33	(13)
2010	Coquimbo Unido	16	(0)
2011	Magallanes	35	(22)
2012–2015	Unión San Felipe	33	(10)
2013–2014	→ San Marcos (loan)	18	(9)
2014	→ Palestino (loan)	10	(2)
2015	Deportes Temuco	28	(7)
2016	Barnechea	16	(4)
2016–2017	Deportes Puerto Montt	21	(3)
2017	Deportes Melipilla	12	(1)
2017–2018	San Antonio Unido	17	(6)
Total		266	(80)
- * Club domestic league appearances and goals

Claudio Andrés Latorre Meza (born 8 June 1986) is a Chilean former footballer who played as a striker. His last club was San Antonio Unido.

== Career ==
Latorre was part of a Chile under-25 squad in a training session led by Claudio Borghi in May 2011, alongside his teammates in Magallanes, Juan Cornejo, Carlos Cisternas and Felipe Reynero.

== Honours ==
Individual

- Primera B de Chile Top-scorer (1): 2011 Apertura
- Copa Chile Top-scorer (1): 2011
