= Juan Cornejo =

Chilean footballer (born 1990)

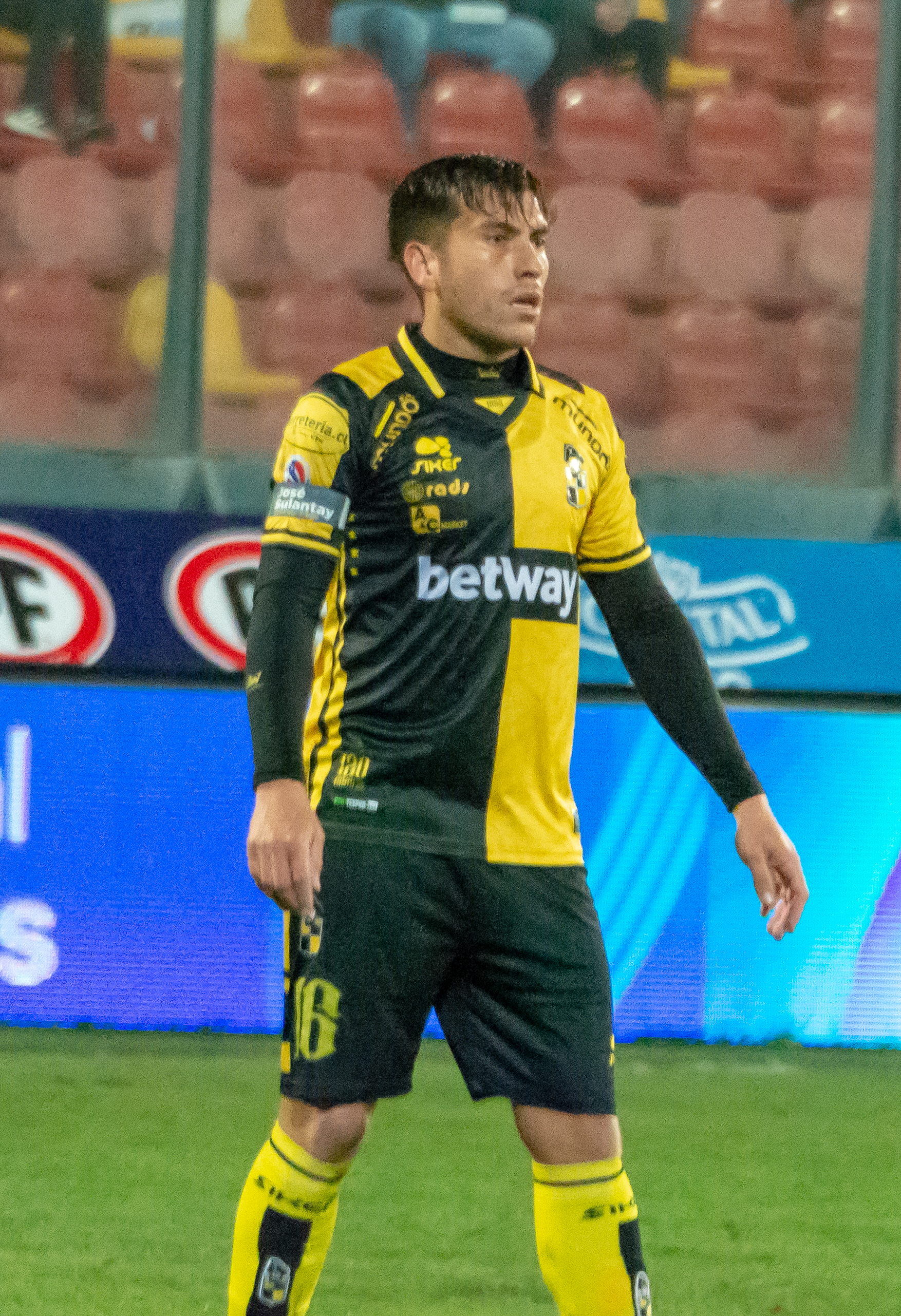
- Cornejo with Coquimbo Unido in 2023

Personal information
- Full name: Juan Francisco Cornejo Palma
- Date of birth: 27 February 1990 (age 36)
- Place of birth: Pichidegua, O'Higgins, Chile
- Height: 1.77 m (5 ft 9 1/2 in)
- Position: Left back

Team information
- Current team: Coquimbo Unido
- Number: 16

Youth career
- Santa Amelia
- Colo-Colo

Senior career*
| Years | Team | Apps | (Gls) |
| 2009–2012 | Magallanes | 71 | (6) |
| 2013–2016 | Audax Italiano | 98 | (11) |
| 2016–2020 | León | 53 | (2) |
| 2019–2020 | → Universidad Católica (loan) | 32 | (1) |
| 2021 | Universidad Católica | 10 | (1) |
| 2022 | Deportes Antofagasta | 19 | (0) |
| 2023– | Coquimbo Unido | 46 | (0) |

International career^{‡}
| 2015– | Chile | 3 | (0) |
- * Club domestic league appearances and goals as of 3 July 2023 ‡ National team caps and goals as of 29 March 2015

Juan Francisco Cornejo Palma (born 27 February 1990) is a Chilean footballer who currently plays for Coquimbo Unido in the Primera División de Chile as a left back.

== Club career ==
Born in Pichidegua, Chile, Cornejo was with local club CD Santa Amelia.

On 14 January 2017 Cornejo made his Liga MX debut against Club Necaxa playing the last 3 minutes of the 1–0 win.

In December 2022, Cornejo signed with Coquimbo Unido for the 2023 season. With them, he won the 2025 Chilean Primera División, the first one for the club.

== International career ==
Cornejo was part of a Chile under-25 squad in a training session led by Claudio Borghi in May 2011, alongside his teammates in Magallanes, Claudio Latorre, Carlos Cisternas and Felipe Reynero.

He was named in the preliminary squad for the 2015 Copa America but was omitted from the final squad.

== Honours ==
Magallanes

- Tercera A de Chile (1): 2010

Universidad Católica

- Chilean Primera División (3): 2019, 2020, 2021
- Supercopa de Chile (3): 2019, 2020, 2021

Coquimbo Unido

- Chilean Primera División (1): 2025
- Supercopa de Chile (1): 2026
- Copa de La Liga (1): 2026

Individual

- Chilean Primera División Ideal Team: 2025
