= Felipe Reynero =

Chilean footballer (born 1989)

Personal information
- Full name: Felipe Andrés Reynero Galarce
- Date of birth: 14 March 1989 (age 37)
- Place of birth: Santiago, Chile
- Height: 1.78 m (5 ft 10 in)
- Position: Right winger

Youth career
- 2006–2008: Universidad Católica

Senior career*
Years	Team	Apps	(Gls)
2009	San Antonio Unido	–	(–)
2010–2011	Magallanes	54	(20)
2012	Rangers	35	(5)
2013–2014	Huachipato	42	(5)
2014–2016	Universidad de Concepción	33	(4)
2016–2017	Deportes Iquique	24	(1)
2017	Atlante	9	(0)
2018	Curicó Unido	9	(0)
2019–2021	Cobresal	58	(12)
2022	Ñublense	18	(0)
2023–2024	Deportes Copiapó	45	(6)
2025	Coquimbo Unido	1	(0)
2025–2026	Deportes Temuco	21	(3)
- * Club domestic league appearances and goals as of 13 November 2026

Felipe Andrés Reynero Galarce (born 14 March 1989) is a Chilean footballer who plays as a winger.

== Career ==
He signed with Deportes Copiapó for the 2023 season of the Chilean Primera División.

In February 2025, Reynero signed with Coquimbo Unido. In July of the same year, he switched to Deportes Temuco.

At the international level, Reynero was part of a Chile under-25 squad for a training session led by Claudio Borghi in May 2011, alongside his teammates in Magallanes, Juan Cornejo, Claudio Latorre and Carlos Cisternas.

== Personal life ==
He is the son of the former professional footballer Roberto Reynero.

== Honours ==
Magallanes

- Tercera A de Chile (1): 2010
