= Club Deportivo Pilmahue =

Chilean football club

Pilmahue
- Nickname(s): Verdes (Green) "Los Volcanicos"
- Ground: Matías Vidal Pérez; Villarrica, Chile
- Capacity: 3,000 onlooker
- Coach: John Bustamante
- League: Tercera División B
Home colours	Away colours	Third colours

Club Deportivo Pilmahue, also known as Pilmahue, is a Chilean football club based in the city of Villarrica. They currently play at the fifth level of Chilean football, the Tercera B of Chile.

== Stadium ==
The stadium of Pilmahue, is the Stadium Matías Vidal Pérez.

- Direction: Villarrica, Chile
- Capacity: 4,000

== Coach ==
- (Chile) Freddy Ferragut (2017–18)
- (Chile) John Bustamante (2018-)

== Honours ==
Nationals
Competition	Titles	Runners-up
Tercera División B (1/0)	2018

== Uniform ==
- Home Uniform: Green shirt, green pants and half black.
- Away Uniform: White shirt, green pants and half black.

== Sponsors ==
Period	Brand	Sponsor
2017	OneFit	Mora Valero
2018	OneFit	Correo del Lago
2019	Squadra	Repuestos Barrera
