= Simone Barrientos =

German politician

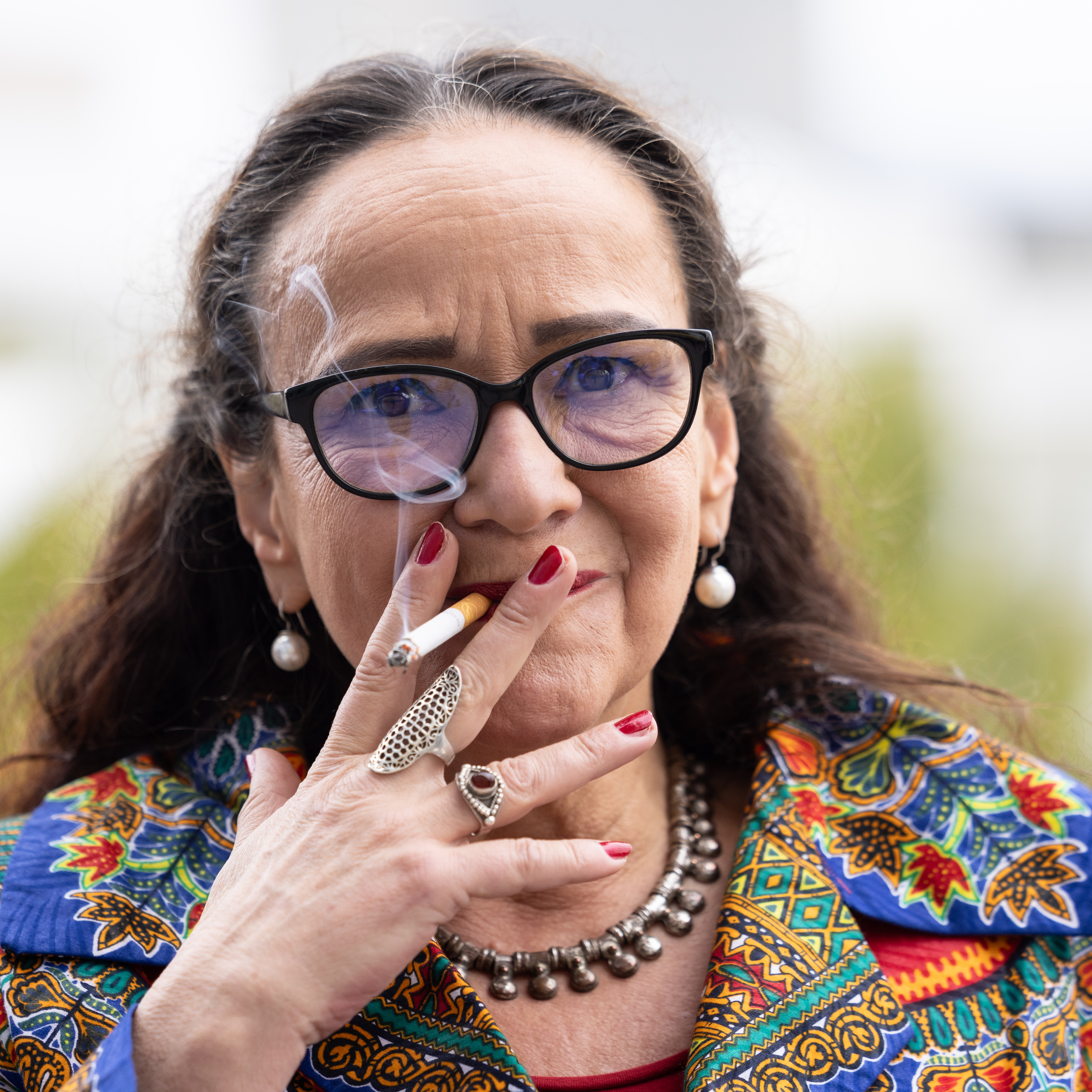
- Simone Barrientos in 2025

Member of the Bundestag
- In office 2017–2021

Personal details
- Born: 5 October 1963 (age 62) Eisleben, East Germany (now Germany)
- Party: The Left

Simone Barrientos (born 5 October 1963) is a German politician. Born in Eisleben, Saxony-Anhalt, she represents The Left. Simone Barrientos has served as a member of the Bundestag from the state of Bavaria from 2017 until 2021.

== Life ==
Barrientos grew up in Neustrelitz as the child of a single mother who was a dancer with the folklore ensemble of the GDR and the Friedrich-Wolf-Theater in Neustrelitz. She was also looked after in state nurseries and in a Catholic children's home. After attending school, she first learned the profession of an industrial electrician at the Deutsche Reichsbahn. At the age of 17 she gave birth to a son whose father had left for the "West". She completed a further apprenticeship as a commercial advertiser. After the fall of the Berlin Wall in the GDR, she worked in various sectors until 2008: as a draftswoman, interpreter, in a casting office and in film production. From 2008 to 2017, she managed the publishing house Kulturmaschinen. She became member of the bundestag after the 2017 German federal election, where she was a member of the Committee for Culture and Media. She was also the spokesperson for cultural policy for her parliamentary group.
