= 1987 Campeonato Nacional Segunda División =

Segunda División
- Season: 1987
- Champions: Deportes La Serena
- Promoted: Deportes La Serena; Deportes Valdivia; O'Higgins
- Relegated: Iván Mayo; Quintero Unido; Deportes Laja; Unión Santa Cruz

The 1987 Segunda División de Chile was the 36th season of the Segunda División de Chile.

Deportes La Serena was the tournament's champion.

== Aggregate table ==
=== North Zone ===
Pos	Team	Pld	W	D	L	GF	GA	GD	Pts	Promotion or relegation
1	Deportes La Serena	26	12	11	3	45	22	+23	37 (Note: Two bonus points after reaching 1987 Segunda División Copa Polla Gol final.)	Promoted to 1988 Chilean Primera División
2	Regional Atacama	26	13	7	6	47	27	+20	33	Qualified to Promotion playoffs
3	Antofagasta	26	12	8	6	44	27	+17	32	
4	Coquimbo Unido	26	10	10	6	39	29	+10	31 (Note: One bonus point after reaching 1987 Segunda División Copa Polla Gol semifinals.)	
5	Deportes Ovalle	26	11	8	7	39	28	+11	30	
6	Santiago Wanderers	26	9	11	6	35	31	+4	29	
7	Deportes Arica	26	8	12	6	31	25	+6	28	
8	Audax Italiano	26	9	9	8	40	43	−3	27	
9	Unión San Felipe	26	8	10	8	29	40	−11	26	
10	Cobreandino	26	6	11	9	24	30	−6	23	
11	Unión La Calera	26	7	7	12	27	42	−15	21	
12	Soinca Bata	26	4	11	11	33	39	−6	19	To Relegation Playoffs
13	Iván Mayo	26	4	10	12	26	50	−24	18	Relegated to 1988 Tercera División de Chile
14	Quintero Unido	26	4	5	17	28	54	−26	13	Relegated to 1988 Tercera División de Chile

Source: rsssf.com

=== South Zone ===
Pos	Team	Pld	W	D	L	GF	GA	GD	Pts	Promotion or relegation
1	Deportes Valdivia	26	11	13	2	30	15	+15	35	Promoted to 1988 Chilean Primera División
2	O'Higgins	26	11	9	6	35	23	+12	32 (Note: One bonus point after reaching 1987 Segunda División Copa Polla Gol semifinals.)	Qualified to Promotion playoffs
3	Deportes Temuco	26	9	10	7	42	32	+10	30 (Note: Two bonus points after reaching 1987 Segunda División Copa Polla Gol final.)	
4	Curicó Unido	26	8	13	5	32	26	+6	29	
5	Deportes Puerto Montt	26	9	11	6	30	25	+5	29	
6	Iberia Biobío	26	9	10	7	25	24	+1	28	
7	Ñublense	26	10	6	10	43	39	+4	26	
8	Malleco Unido	26	7	11	8	32	33	−1	25	
9	Provincial Osorno	26	8	8	10	30	32	−2	24	
10	Deportes Linares	26	7	10	9	24	35	−11	24	
11	General Velásquez	26	8	7	11	27	32	−5	23	
12	Magallanes	26	7	7	12	21	32	−11	21	To Relegation Playoffs
13	Deportes Laja	26	6	9	11	21	35	−14	21	Relegated to 1988 Tercera División de Chile
14	Unión Santa Cruz	26	6	8	12	19	28	−9	20	Relegated to 1988 Tercera División de Chile

Source: rsssf.com

== See also ==
- Chilean football league system
