= Juventud Olímpica =

C.D. Juventud Olímpica
- Full name: Club Deportivo Juventud Olímpica
- Nickname: Academia Azul y Oro azul y oro capitalino
- Dissolved: 2007
- Ground: Estadio Ana Mercedez; Sonsonate, El Salvador
- Capacity: 8,000
Home colours

Club Deportivo Juventud Olímpica , commonly known as Juventud Olímpica was a Salvadoran professional football club based in several locations including Sonsonate, Acajutla and also Barrio Santa Anita, San Salvador.

== History ==
On January 13, 1939, the club merged with Maya to be named Juventus, however one year the club reverted to its old name leaving for Club Maya to become defunct. In 1974–1975, the club rebranded itself as Negocios Internacionales and it only lasted one year reverting to Juventud Olímpica.

== Achievements ==
- Salvadoran Primera División: 2

Champions (2):1971, 1973
Runner-up (4): 1952–53, 1963–64, 1972, 1974–75

== Records ==
=== Club records ===
- First Match (prior to creation of a league): vs. TBD (a club from TBD), Year
- First Match (official): vs. TBD, year
- Most points in La Primera: 00 points (00 win, 00 draws, 0 losses) Year/Year
- Least points in La Primera: 00 points (0 win, 0 draws, 00 losses) Year/year

=== Individual records ===
- Most capped player for El Salvador: 50 (0 whilst at Juventud Plimpica), TBD
- Most international caps for El Salvador while a Juventud Olimpica player: 1, TBD
- Most goals in a season, all competitions: unknown player, O (Year/year) (00 in League, 00 in Cup competitions)
- Most goals in a season, La Primera: TBD, 7

=== Concacaf competitions record ===
| Competition | Played | Won | Drawn | Lost | GF | GA |
|---|---|---|---|---|---|---|
| Copa Interclubes UNCAF | 30 | 6 | 5 | 19 | 25 | 49 |
| CONCACAF Champions League | 8 | 1 | 3 | 5 | 9 | 12 |
| TOTAL | 38 | 7 | 8 | '24 | 34 | 61 |

- Copa Interclubes UNCAF: 2 appearances

Best: Fifth Place
1973 : Fifth Place
1975 : Sixth Place

- CONCACAF Champions League: 3 appearances

Best: Second Round
1973 : First Round
1974 : Second Round
1975 : First Round

=== Historical Matches ===
| December 22, 1946 Friendly | Juventud Olimpica | 1-4 | Club Leon | San Salvador, El Salvador |
| | Miguel Jose Deras | | Adalberto López; Marcos Aurelio; Luis Luna | Stadium: TBD |

| December 22, 1951 Friendly | Juventud Olimpica | 3-6 | Newell's Old Boys | San Salvador, El Salvador |
| | TBD; TBD; TBD | | TBD; TBD; TBD | Stadium: TBD |

| 1955 Friendly | Juventud Olimpica | 1-1 | Huracán | San Salvador, El Salvador |
| | TBD | | TBD | Stadium: TBD |

| September 15, 1956 Friendly | Juventud Olimpica | 0–3 | Brasil de Pelotas | San Salvador, El Salvador |
| | Nil | | TBD; TBD; TBD | Stadium: TBD |

| 22 December 1957 Friendly | Juventud | 0-3 | Cúcuta Deportivo | San Salvador, El Salvador |
| | Nil | | TBD; TBD | Stadium: TBD |

| 1971 Friendly | Juventud | 1-2 | Central Español | San Salvador, El Salvador |
| | Juan Ramon Martinez 36' | | Sergio Castillo 48'; Antonio Veloso | Stadium: TBD |

== Notable players ==
- (El Salvador) Orlando “Calulo” Hernández
- (Argentina) Mario Carlos Rey
- (Argentina) Juan Quarterone (1965–1968)
- (Honduras) Rodolfo Popo Godoy

=== Captains ===
| Years | Captain |
|---|---|
| 1973 | (El Salvador) Rene Toledo (DF) |
| 1976-77 | (El Salvador) Guillermo Castro (FW) |
| TBD | (El Salvador) Fredy Rivera (FW) |
| TBD | (El Salvador) TBD (FW) |

== Notable coaches ==
- (El Salvador) Manuel “Cuico” Gómez (1959)
- (Uruguay) (Brazil) Luis Comitante (1967)
- (Argentina) Mario Carlos Rey (1971)
- (Argentina) Juan Quarterone (1973)
- (Argentina) Gregorio Bundio (1974)
- (El Salvador) Ricardo Tomasino (1974–1975)
- (El Salvador) Victor Manuel Ochoa (1975)
- (El Salvador) Raúl Magaña (1976)
- (Brazil) Jorge Tupinambá dos Santos
- (El Salvador) Santiago Chicas
- Mauro Liberia
