= Unión Santa María =

Chilean football club

- Full name: Club Unión Santa María de Los Ángeles
- Nicknames: Angelinos, La Luciernaga, Mecánica, Marianos, Fluorescentes' papiti
- Founded: November 19, 2009
- Ground: Estadio Municipal de Los Ángeles; Los Ángeles, Chile
- Capacity: 3,450
- Chairman: Pedro Heller
- Manager: Gerardo Silva
- League: Tercera División
- 2010: Tercera División B (Champion)
- Website: http://www.unionsantamaria.com
Home colours	Away colours

Unión Santa María is a Chilean Football club, their home town is Los Ángeles, Chile. They currently play in the fourth level of Chilean football, the Tercera División.

The club were founded on November 19, 2009, and participated for 1 year in Tercera División A and 1 year in Cuarta División.

== Seasons played ==
- 1 season in Tercera División
- 1 season in Cuarta División

== Titles ==
- Cuarta División: 2010

== See also ==
- Chilean football league system
