= Wilfredo Barrientos =

Chilean footballer (born 1946)

Personal information
- Full name: Wilfredo Ramón Barrientos Valdés
- Date of birth: 29 July 1946 (age 80)
- Place of birth: Rancagua, Chile
- Position: Forward

Youth career
- O'Higgins

Senior career*
Years	Team	Apps	(Gls)
- O'Higgins
- Colchagua
- Chiprodal
- Colchagua
1974	Izabal JC		
1974–1978	Sonsonate		
1978–1979	UES		
1979–1982	Xelajú MC		
- * Club domestic league appearances and goals

Wilfredo Ramón Barrientos Valdés (born 29 July 1946), also known as Willy Barrientos, is a Chilean former professional footballer who played as a forward for clubs in Chile and Central America.

== Playing career ==
Barientos is a product of O'Higgins youth system, playing after for Colchagua and Chiprodal de Graneros, with whom he won the Campeonato Regional Zona Central.

He emigrated to Central America and spent ten years in Guatemala and five years in El Salvador. In Guatemala, he played for Izabal JC and Xelajú MC, with whom he won the league title in 1980 with his compatriot Javier Mascaró as coach. In El Salvador he played for both Sonsonate and Universidad de El Salvador.

== Coaching career ==
Barrientos has developed an extensive career as coach of youth players, men and women, in the United States, also winning many titles in New York.

== Personal life ==
He is the uncle of the former professional footballer and current coach Henry Barrientos, whom he suggested to move towards Central America at the end of 1989. In addition, his brother and Henry's father, served as director for O'Higgins.

Both Wilfredo and his nephew, Henry, were coached by the Chilean coach Rolando Torino.

== Honours ==
=== As player ===
Xelajú MC

- Liga Nacional de Fútbol de Guatemala: 1980
