= Acajutla F.C. =

Association football club in El Salvador

Acajutla-Tiburones F.C.
- Full name: Acajutla Futbol Club
- Founded: 1948 (as El Puerto de Acajutla F.C.); 1981 (as Acajutla Futbol Club); 1989 (as C.D Tiburones)
- Manager: Unknown
- League: Unknown
Home colours

Acajutla Futbol Club is a Salvadoran professional football club based in Acajutla. They changed their name in 1989 season to the Tiburones.

== History ==
The club started as El Puerto de Acajutla, the club later changed to Tiburones, during their first Primera División campaign. Prior to the club relegation they changed their name to Árabe Marte. The club won promotion to the Primera División for the 1997–1998 season before they sold their spot to Atletico Marte. The club briefly returned in 2008–2009, however they become defunct again.

== Honours ==
=== Domestic honours ===
- Segunda División Salvadorean and predecessors
- Champions (1) : 1985/86
- Tercera División Salvadorean and predecessors
- Champions:(1) : TBD

== Sponsors ==
- 1995–1996: Canal 12, Umbro, Coca-Cola, Urgente Express

== Record ==
=== Year-by-year ===
Season	Positions	Final series
1986–87	9th	Did not qualify
1987–88	2nd	Semi-Finals
1988–89	4th	Semi-Finals
1989–90	6th	Did not qualify
1990–91	4th	Did not qualify
1991–92	6th	Did not qualify
1992–93	8th	Did not qualify
1993–94	4th	Semi-finals
1994–95	7th	Did not qualify
1995–96	10th	Relegated

== Notable players ==
Players listed below have had junior and/or senior international caps for their respective countries before, while and/or after playing at Acajutla/Tiburones. Players marked in bold gained their caps while playing at Acajutla/Tiburones.

- (Brazil) Eraldo Correia
- (Brazil) Nunes
- (El Salvador) **Salvador Alfaro** (1 Cap)
- (El Salvador) **Ricardo Colorado** (1 Cap)
- (El Salvador) Elias Montes
- (El Salvador) Jorge Morán Mojica
- (El Salvador) Carlos Cacho Melenedez (1987)
- (El Salvador) Oscar Lagarto Ulloa (1987)
- (Panama) **Franklin Delgado** (10 caps)
- (Uruguay) Carlos Asrubal Padin
- (Uruguay) Carlos Reyes
- (El Salvador) Luis Atilio Estrada
- (El Salvador) Gerardo Galán
- (El Salvador) Raúl Chamagua
- (El Salvador) **Francisco Navarrete** (1 Cap)
- (El Salvador) **Amílcar González** (3 Caps)
- (El Salvador) Mario Guevara
- (El Salvador) **Salomón Campos** (3 Caps)

=== Captains ===
Years	Captain
1987	(El Salvador) Carlos Cacho Melenedez (GK)
TBD	(El Salvador) TBD (FW)
TBD	(Brazil) Eraldo Correia (FW)

== Former coaches ==
- (El Salvador) Cesar Acevedo (1982)
- (Argentina) Juan Quarterone
- (El Salvador) Conrado Miranda
- (El Salvador) Ricardo Lopez Tenorio (1987)
- (El Salvador) Demar Moran (1993–1994)
- (El Salvador) Saul Molina (February 1995-)
- (El Salvador) Jorge Patris (October 1995)
- (El Salvador) Raimundo Amaya Revelo (October 1995)
- (El Salvador) Victor Manuel Pacheco (October 1995)
- (El Salvador) Carlos Melendez (October 1995)
