= Rodrigo Pereira (Chilean footballer) =

Chilean footballer (born 1982)

Personal information
- Full name: Rodrigo Antonio Pereira Pereira
- Date of birth: 10 May 1982 (age 44)
- Place of birth: Santiago, Chile
- Height: 1.78 m (5 ft 10 in)
- Position: Forward

Senior career*
Years	Team	Apps	(Gls)
2004–2007	Curicó Unido	–	(–)
2005–2006	→ Magallanes (loan)	–	(–)
2008	Rangers	26	(1)
2009	Naval	17	(3)
2009	Puerto Montt	15	(3)
2010	Unión La Calera	25	(5)
2011	Curicó Unido	58	(7)
2012	San Luis de Quillota	22	(0)
2014	Lota Schwager	11	(0)
- * Club domestic league appearances and goals as of 31 March 2020

Rodrigo Antonio Pereira Pereira (born 10 May 1982) is a Chilean footballer. His last club was Lota Schwager.
