= Jorge Amaya (footballer) =

Chilean footballer and manager

Personal information
- Full name: Jorge Enrique Amaya Villalobos
- Date of birth: 9 October 1952 (age 74)
- Place of birth: Santiago, Chile
- Height: 1.73 m (5 ft 8 in)
- Position: Midfielder

Senior career*
Years	Team	Apps	(Gls)
1973	Naval	12	(0)
1974	O'Higgins	24	(2)
1975–1976	Luis Ángel Firpo		
1979–1980	O'Higgins		
1984	Universidad Católica		

Managerial career
- Cerro Porteño (assistant)
- Libertad (assistant)
- 1994: Caaguazú (city team)
- 1995: Colo-Colo (youth)
- Club Nacional (reserves)
- Rubio Ñu (reserves)
- 12 de Octubre (reserves)
- Sol de América (reserves)
- 2003: Atlántida
- 2005–2006: Manzanillo
- 2006: Rubio Ñu (assistant)
- 2006: Rubio Ñu (reserves)
- 2006–2007: Olimpia (reserves)
- 2007: Persekabpas Pasuruan
- 2008: Tacuary
- 2008: Manzanillo
- 2011: PSIR Rembang
- 2015–2016: Sport Colombia
- * Club domestic league appearances and goals

Jorge Enrique Amaya Villalobos (born 9 October 1952) is a Chilean football manager and former player who played as a midfielder.

== Career ==
A midfielder, Amaya played for Naval, O'Higgins and Universidad Católica in his homeland. Abroad, he played for Luis Ángel Firpo in the Salvadoran top division.

A football manager who graduated in 1989, he has mainly worked in Paraguay. As assistant, he has served in clubs such as Cerro Porteño, Libertad and Rubio Ñu. As coach, he has worked for the reserves of Club Nacional, Rubio Ñu, 12 de Octubre, Sol de América and Olimpia. As head coach, he has worked for Atlántida, Tacuary and Sport Colombia as well as the Caaguazú city team.

In his homeland, he had a stint in the Colo-Colo youth ranks in 1995 alongside Oscar Paulín.

In Mexico, he has worked as coach of Manzanillo.

In Indonesia, he had stints with Persekabpas Pasuruan in 2007, coinciding with his compatriot Francisco Rotunno as player, and PSIR Rembang in 2011.
