= Carlos Reyes (Uruguayan footballer) =

Uruguayan footballer and manager (1957–2009)

Personal information
- Full name: Carlos Reyes Argibay
- Date of birth: 4 July 1956
- Place of birth: Montevideo, Uruguay
- Date of death: 10 June 2009 (aged 52)
- Place of death: Colón, El Salvador
- Position: Midfielder

Youth career
- Nacional

Senior career*
Years	Team	Apps	(Gls)
1975–1981	Sud América		
1982–1983	Peñarol	11	(0)
1984	Audax Italiano	16	(1)
1985	Progreso	6	(0)
1985–1987	Alianza		
1988	Real España		
1989–1990	Aurora		
1990	Sud América		
1991–1993	Acajutla		
1993–1994	Central Izalco		

International career
1979–1980	Uruguay	2	(0)

Managerial career
- 1998: Alianza (assistant)
- 1999: Topiltzín
- 2001: Alianza
- San Salvador FC (assistant)
- 2005–2006: Isidro Metapán (assistant)
- 2007: Independiente FC (assistant)
- 2008–2009: Alianza (assistant)
- * Club domestic league appearances and goals

Carlos Reyes Argibay (4 July 1956 – 10 June 2009) was an Uruguayan football player and manager.

== Career ==
Born in Montevideo, Reyes began playing as a creative midfielder for local side Nacional, the club his parents supported. When he joined rivals Peñarol, his family were upset.

In the first half of 1984, Reyes moved to Chile to play for Audax Italiano at the end of the 1983 season.

At age 29, Reyes moved to play in El Salvador, and ended his career playing in Honduras with Real España, in Uruguay with Sud América and in Guatemala with Aurora.

At international level, Reyes was part of the Uruguay squad in the 1979 Copa América and made 2 appearances in friendlies the next year.

== Death ==
Reyes died of a heart attack nearly Los Chorros resort, El Salvador, on 10 June 2009..
