= Margarita Barrientos =

Argentine activist

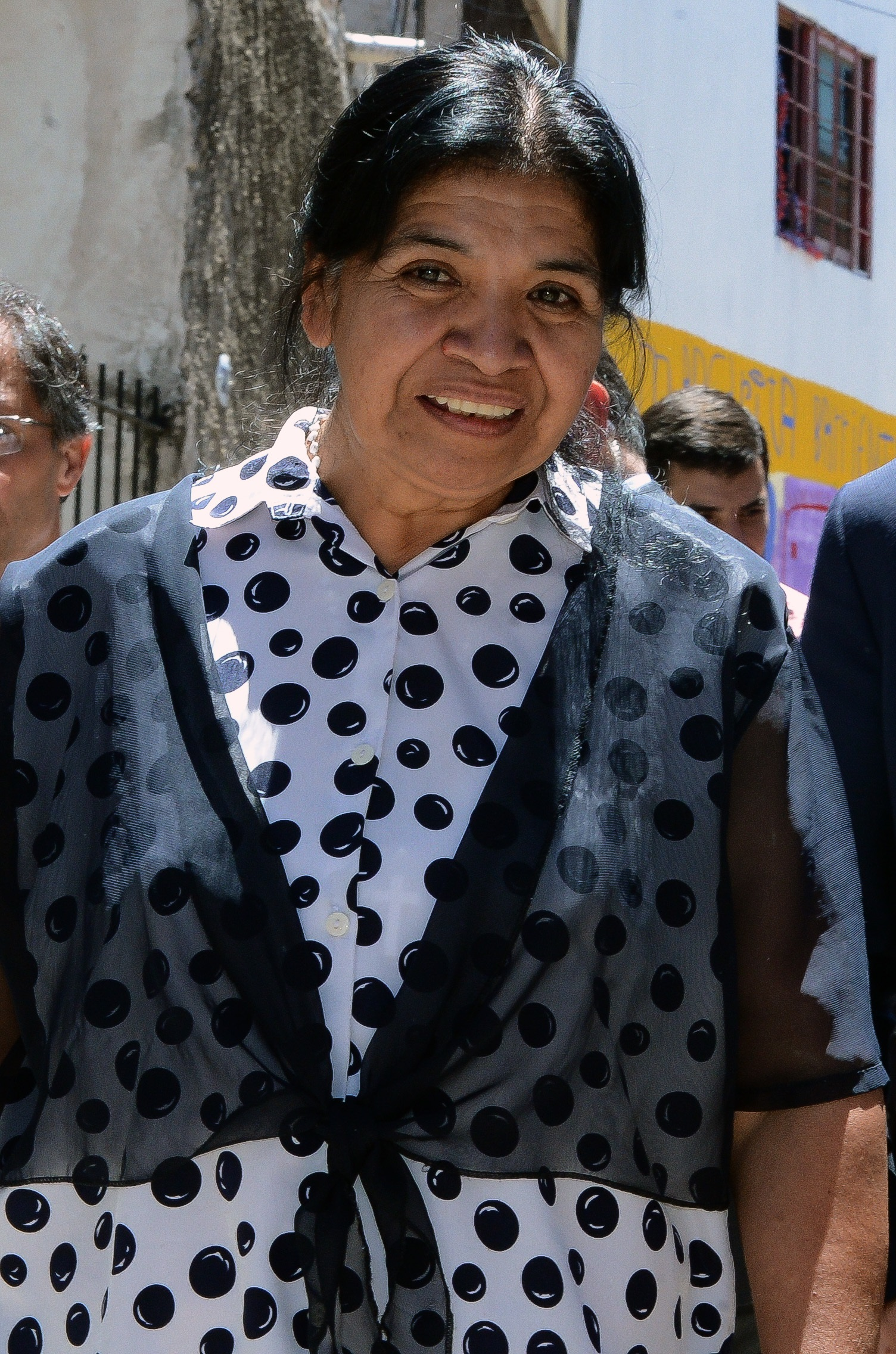
- At Los Piletones Soup Kitchen in 2015
- Born: 12 October 1961 (age 63); Santiago del Estero Province, Argentina
- Occupation: Activist
- Spouse: Isidro Antúnez (died 2017)
- Children: 12

Margarita Barrientos (born 12 October 1961) is an Argentine activist and founder of Los Piletones Soup Kitchen. In 2024, the BBC included her in its 100 Women list, recognizing the most influential women in the world.

== Early life ==
Margarita Barrientos was born in a town near Añatuya on 12 October 1961. Her mother died of Chagas disease when she was a child. There are differing accounts of the years that followed. One is that she traveled directly from Añatuya to Comodoro. Another, maintained by Barrientos' sister Nilda, is that she ran away from her home while her mother was still ill and convalescing.

== Career ==
She married Isidro Antúnez, with whom she had nine children and adopted three. In 1996, she moved to Barrio Los Piletones, a disadvantaged quarter in the south of the city of Buenos Aires. She earned some money by cleaning houses and she and her husband scavenged and sold what they could. In 1966 they started a soup kitchen, calling it Los Piletones and feeding 15 people, eventually increasing to the provision of 2,700 plates of food per day in 2018. The soup kitchen eventually began receiving donations of money and grocery vouchers from Disco supermarkets. Other free services run by volunteers were later added to the dining hall, such as the San Cayetano daycare center, the Ángela Palmisano health center, and a day center for the elderly. Computer, art, and gymnastics classes were organized in the neighborhood. The Margarita Barrientos Foundation built a mothers' club, a club for the elderly, two kindergartens, and a center for victims of domestic violence.

In 2017, her husband Isidro died from complications of diabetes.

In February 2018, Barrientos opened a restaurant in an old Underground car parked 200 meters from Los Piletones, with the idea of bringing funds and visibility to the work in the kitchen, and also to teach cooking. It also prepares food for people in Cañuelas and Santiago del Estero.

By 2020, four community kitchens were feeding more than 5,000 people. Barrientos complained that since the beginning of the COVID-19 pandemic, she had only received help twice from the Ministry of Social Development of Alberto Fernandez's government.

I always said that the kitchen does not have to exist. What should exist is decent work for the people. People have to choose what they want to eat, not me choosing for them.

In August 2024, footballer Lionel Messi showed his support by presenting her with a signed jersey to be auctioned at the annual fundraising dinner of the Margarita Barrientos Foundation.

== Political positions ==
Barrientos has been a supporter of the PRO, including its representatives Mauricio Macri and Horacio Rodríguez Larreta. In 2021, she was received by President Alberto Fernández at the Casa Rosada.

== Awards and recognition ==
- 1999: "Woman of the Year" from the Social Action Co-op (Spanish: Cooperadora de Acción Social)
- 2010: Abanderados de la Argentina Solidaria Award
- 2011: Domingo Faustino Sarmiento Award for outstanding women from the Argentine Senate
- 2011: Illustrious Citizen of Buenos Aires
- 2011: Margarita Barrientos Foundation declared to be of Social Interest by the Buenos Aires City Legislature
- 2014: Tribute from the Argentine Chamber of Deputies
- 2018: Konex Award Diploma of Merit as one of the most important social leaders of the last decade in Argentina
- 2024: Included on the BBC's 100 Women list
