= Carlos Cisternas =

Chilean footballer (born 1985)

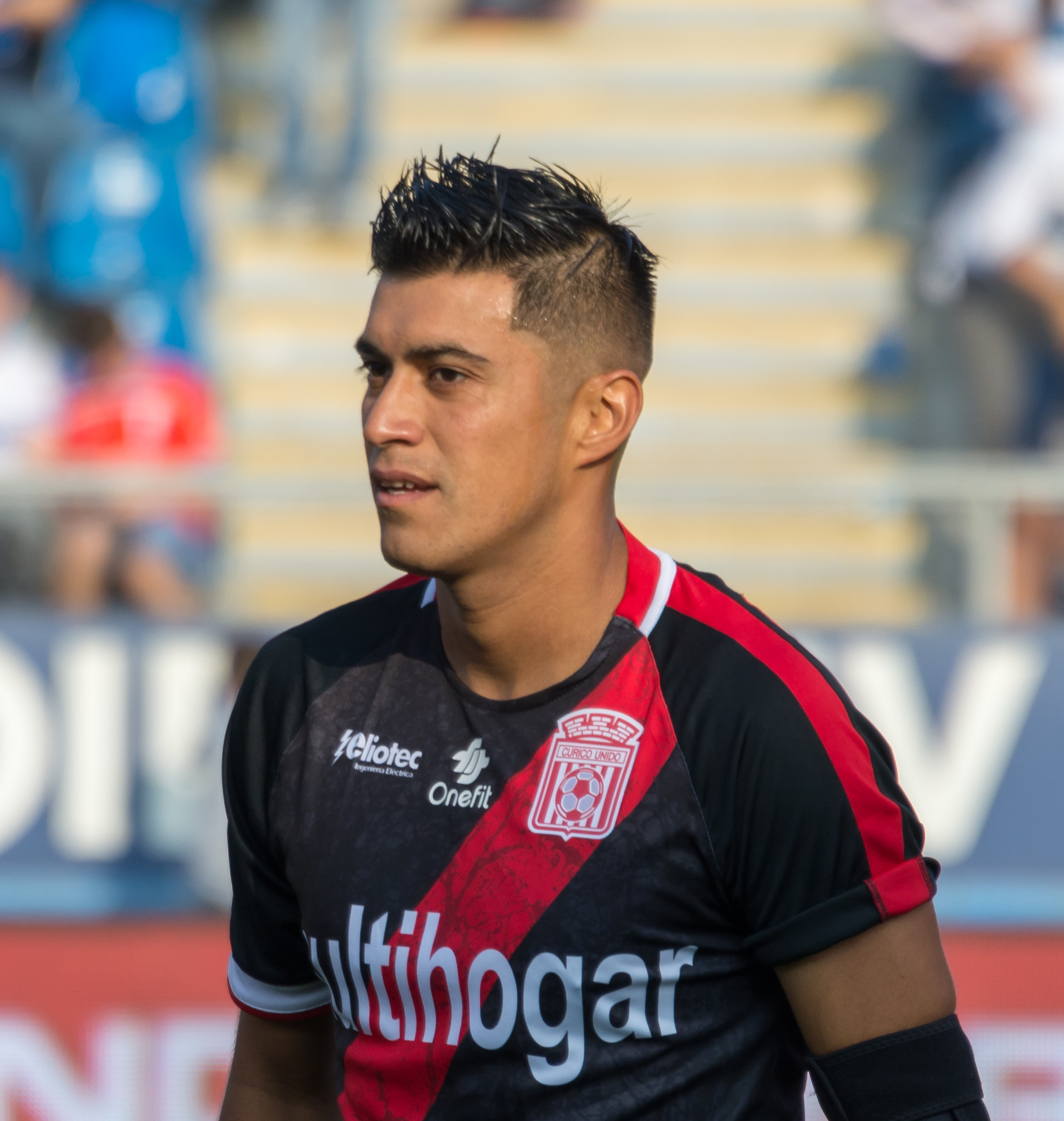
- Cisternas with Curicó Unido in 2019

Personal information
- Full name: Carlos Patricio Cisternas Tobar
- Date of birth: 27 September 1985 (age 41)
- Place of birth: San Fernando, Chile
- Height: 1.79 m (5 ft 10 1/2 in)
- Position: Midfielder

Youth career
- Colo-Colo

Senior career*
Years	Team	Apps	(Gls)
2004–2006	Colo-Colo	5	(0)
2005	→ Magallanes (loan)	24	(3)
2007	Ñublense	16	(2)
2008	Universidad de Concepción	12	(0)
2009–2010	Deportes Puerto Montt	26	(1)
2011–2017	Magallanes	153	(6)
2017–2019	Curicó Unido	28	(0)
2020	Deportes Santa Cruz	17	(0)
2021–2022	Rodelindo Román	26	(0)
2023	General Velásquez	20	(0)
2024	Colchagua	–	(–)
Total		327	(12)

International career
2007	Chile	1	(0)
- * Club domestic league appearances and goals

Carlos Patricio Cisternas Tobar (born 27 September 1985) is a Chilean former footballer who played as a midfielder.

== Club career ==
In 2021, Cisternas signed with Rodelindo Román in the Chilean Segunda División.

His last club was Colchagua in 2024.

== International career ==
He played for Chile in an international friendly match against Cuba on 16 May 2007.

Cisternas was part of a Chile under-25 squad in a training session led by Claudio Borghi in May 2011, alongside his teammates in Magallanes, Juan Cornejo, Claudio Latorre and Felipe Reynero.
