= Juventud O'Higgins =

Chilean football club

- Full name: Club Deportivo Juventud O'Higgins
- Nickname: Juventud O'Higgins
- Founded: 1956
- Ground: Estadio Balneario Municipal; Curacaví, Chile
- Capacity: 2,000
- League: Curacaví Amateur League
- 1997: 8th (Lig. Zona Norte) Tercera División
Home colours

Juventud O'Higgins is a Chilean football club, their home town is Curacaví, Santiago Metropolitan Region. They currently play in the Curacaví Amateur Association.

The club founded in October 17, 1956, played between 1986 and 1997 in the third and fourth levels of the Chilean League system, winning two fourth level championships, the last one in 1993.

Their last season was 1997, when they finalized last at the Northern group of the third level league and refused to play the next season at the fourth level because of economic issues.

== Honours ==
- Cuarta División (2): 1985, 1993

=== Minor Titles ===
- Campeonato Regional Amateur Santiago (1): 2010

== Seasons played ==
- 8 seasons in Tercera División
- 6 seasons in Cuarta División
