= Patricio Sasmay =

Chilean footballer

Personal information
- Full name: Jorge Patricio Sasmay Román
- Place of birth: Chile
- Date of death: 17 January 2016
- Place of death: Antiguo Cuscatlán, El Salvador
- Position: Goalkeeper

Youth career
- Universidad Católica

Senior career*
Years	Team	Apps	(Gls)
1962	Unión Española		
1962–1963	Magallanes		
196?	UCA		
1971	Excélsior		
1972	Atlético Marte		
197?	Águila		
- * Club domestic league appearances and goals

Jorge Patricio Sasmay Román (unknown – 17 January 2016), known as Patricio Sasmay, was a Chilean professional footballer who played as a goalkeeper for clubs in Chile and El Salvador.

== Career ==
In his homeland, Sasmay played for Unión Española and Magallanes in the top division.

He after developed his career in the Salvadoran football, playing for clubs such as Club Deportivo UCA, Excélsior, Atlético Marte and Águila.

== Personal life ==
His parents were Jorge Sasmay Vera and Sylvia Iris Román Rojas.

Sasmay was of Diaguita descent.

He died on 17 January 2016 in Antiguo Cuscatlán, El Salvador.
