= Defensor Casablanca =

Chilean football club

- Full name: Club Deportivo Defensor Casablanca
- Founded: October 17, 1919
- Ground: Municipal de Casablanca; Casablanca, Chile
- Capacity: 1,000
- Manager: Rodrigo Bendeck
- League: Tercera División B
Home colours

Club Deportivo Defensor Casablanca is a Chilean football club, their home town is Casablanca, Chile. They currently play in the fifth level of Chilean football, the Tercera División B.

The club were founded on October 17, 1919 and participated for 15 years in Tercera División A and 10 years in Tercera División B.

== Seasons played ==
- 15 seasons in Tercera División A
- 11 seasons in Tercera División B

== See also ==
- Chilean football league system
