= Andrés Paretti =

Chilean footballer and manager

Personal information
- Full name: Andrés Enrique Paretti Toledo
- Date of birth: 12 May 1947 (age 79)
- Place of birth: Santiago, Chile
- Height: 1.67 m (5 ft 6 in)
- Position: Left winger

Youth career
- Universidad Católica

Senior career*
Years	Team	Apps	(Gls)
1963–1965	Universidad Católica		
1965	→ UTE (loan)		
1966	Alianza		
1967–1969	Luis Ángel Firpo		

Managerial career
- 1977–1990: IRA 26
- * Club domestic league appearances and goals

Andrés Enrique Paretti Toledo (born 12 May 1947) is a Chilean former professional footballer who played as a left winger for clubs in Chile and El Salvador.

== Career ==
Paretti joined Universidad Católica after making appearances in a youth championship. In his country of birth, he also played on loan at Universidad Técnica del Estado in the Chilean Segunda División in 1965.

After having chances to play for Huachipato and Universidad Católica, he emigrated to El Salvador and joined Alianza in 1966, winning the first league title for the club in its history. He coincided with his compatriots Miguel Hermosilla and Ricardo Sepúlveda, taking part of the well-known squad nicknamed La Orquesta Alba (The White Orchestra). Then, he played for Luis Ángel Firpo until 1969, leaving the activity at early age due to a knee injury.

After his retirement as a player, he became a football manager thanks to Hernán Carrasco and founded and coached IRA 26, the team of the company where he worked, reaching the Segunda División de El Salvador.

== Personal life ==
He was nicknamed Chico (Little) due to his height.

He made his home in El Salvador and worked for IRA, a milk and grain distribution company, for 23 years. After, he worked for a supermarket and a drugstore.

He married Blanca Lidia Flores and they have two children, Uberlinda and Andrés Jr.

== Honours ==
Alianza

- Salvadoran Primera División: 1965–66
