= Deportes Luis Matte Larraín =

Chilean football club

Luis Matte Larraín
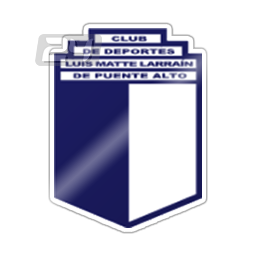
- Full name: Club de Deportes Luis Matte Larraín
- Nickname: Papeleros
- Founded: August 20, 1940
- Dissolved: 2018
- Ground: Estadio Municipal de Puente Alto; Puente Alto, Chile
- Capacity: 3,000
- Chairman: Juan Miguel Flores
- Manager: Francisco Lopez
- League: Tercera División B
- 2010: 10th Zona Sur
Home colours	Away colours

Club de Deportes Luis Matte Larraín was a Chilean football club based in Puente Alto, Chile. They currently play in the fifth level of Chilean football, the Tercera División B.

The club were founded on 20 August 1940, and participated for 9 years in Tercera División A and 20 years in Tercera División B. Finally the club was dissolved in 2018 for leaving the ANFA.

== Seasons played ==
- 9 seasons in Tercera División A
- 20 seasons in Tercera División B

== Titles ==
- Tercera División B: 1994

== See also ==
- Chilean football league system
