= Graneros Unido =

Chilean football club

- Full name: Club Deportivo Graneros Unido
- Founded: May 7, 1917
- Ground: Municipal de Graneros; Graneros, Chile
- Capacity: 3.500
- League: Tercera División
Home colours	Away colours

Club Deportivo Graneros Unido is a Chilean Football club, their home town is Graneros, Chile.

The club were founded on May 7, 1917, and participated for 4 years in Tercera División A and 10 seasons in Tercera División B.

== Seasons played ==
- 4 seasons in Tercera División A
- 10 seasons in Tercera División B

== Titles ==
- Tercera División B: 1 (1991)

== See also ==
- Chilean football league system
