= Franklin Delgado =

Panamanian footballer (born 1966)

Personal information
- Full name: Franklin Ulises Delgado
- Date of birth: February 18, 1966 (age 60)
- Place of birth: , Panama
- Height: 1.81 m (5 ft 11 in)
- Position: Defender

Senior career*
Years	Team	Apps	(Gls)
1989	Pan de Azúcar		
1992–1993	Tiburones		
1994–1995	Municipal Limeño		
1995–1996	Platense		
1999–2000	Sporting'89		
2000–2001	San Francisco		

International career^{‡}
1988–2000	Panama	49	(0)
- * Club domestic league appearances and goals ‡ National team caps and goals as of 15 August 2015

Franklin Ulises Delgado (born 18 February 1966) is a Panamanian retired football defender.

== Club career ==
Nicknamed Morocho (The dark-haired), Delgado was named 1989 MVP of the year of the second ANAPROF season, when playing for Pan de Azúcar. He had spells abroad at Salvadoran sides Municipal Limeño and Tiburones and in Honduras with Platense whom he joined in September 1995. He extended his stay at local side San Francisco in summer 2001 for a final season after joining them in summer 2000 from Sporting'89.

== International career ==
Delgado made his debut for Panama in a July 1988 FIFA World Cup qualification match against Costa Rica and has earned a total of 49 caps, scoring no goals. He represented his country in 21 FIFA World Cup qualification matches and played at the 1993 CONCACAF Gold Cup.

His final international was a November 2000 FIFA World Cup qualification match against Trinidad and Tobago.
