= Deportes Pintana =

Chilean football club

- Full name: Club de Deportes Pintana
- Nickname: Auriverdes
- Founded: February 18, 2009
- Dissolved: 2017
- Ground: Municipal de La Pintana; La Pintana, Chile
- Capacity: 6,000
- League: Segunda División
- 2017 (last): 10th (relegated)
| Home colours | Away colours |

Club de Deportes Pintana was a Chilean football club based in the commune of La Pintana, Santiago. They lastly played in the third level of Chilean football, the Segunda División.

The club was founded on February 18, 2009, as Municipal La Pintana and played five seasons in the Tercera División and one season in the Tercera B.

At the end of 2017, the club was disbanded after being relegated to the fourth-tier amateur level (the Tercera División).

== Seasons played ==
- 3 seasons in Segunda División
- 5 seasons in Tercera División
- 1 season in Tercera B

== Titles ==
- Tercera División B: 2009

== See also ==
- Chilean football league system
