= Tercera B =

Tercera División B
- Founded: 1983
- Country: Chile
- Confederation: CONMEBOL
- Number of clubs: 36
- Level on pyramid: 5
- Promotion to: Tercera División
- Relegation to: Local Association
- Current champions: Aguará (1st title)
- Most championships: Juventud O'Higgins (2 titles)
- Broadcaster(s): DirecTV Sports; CDF
- Website: Official webpage

Tercera División B de Chile (Third Division B of Chile) is the fifth tier of Chilean football (soccer) in the Liga Chilena de Fútbol, and is organized by the Federación de Fútbol de Chile and the Asociación Nacional de Fútbol Amateur de Chile. It is both the fifth level of the Chilean football league system and the second league for Chilean Football Youth Leagues.

== History ==
The Cuarta División de Chile was founded in 1983, as the successor to the Campeonato Regional Zona Central, The division was disbanded in late 2003 before returning in 2009 with its name changed to Tercera División B.

Thirty-six teams participated in the 2024 season. The winner and the runner-up of the league are promoted to Tercera División.

== Cuarta División / Tercera B champions ==
=== As fourth level of the Chilean League system ===
Ed.	Season	Champion	Runner-up
1	1983	Chilectra	Andarivel de El Monte
2	1984	Soinca Bata	Andarivel de El Monte
3	1985	Juventud O'Higgins	Estudiantes de Quilpué
4	1986	Deportes Gasco	LAN Chile
5	1987	Municipal Las Condes	Barnechea
6	1988	Thomas Bata	Barnechea
7	1989	Unión Veterana	C.T.C.
8	1990	Tricolor Municipal	Juventud Puente Alto
9	1991	Chiprodal de Graneros	Deportes Gasco
10	1992	Trasandino	Cultural Orocoipo
11	1993	Juventud O'Higgins	Unión Municipal La Florida
12	1994	Luis Matte Larraín	Arturo Prat de Hualañé
13	1995	Deportes San Bernardo	Juventud O'Higgins
14	1996	Malloco Atlético	Deportes Maipo
15	1997	Deportes Polpaico	Ferroviarios
16	1998	Hosanna	Estrella de Chile
17	1999	C.T.I.	Municipal Limache
18	2000	Municipal Nogales Melón	Manuela Figueroa
19	2001	Con Con National	Cristo Salva
20	2002	Deportes Quilicura	Lautaro de Buin
21	2003	Ferroviarios	Deportes San Bernardo
2004–2008: No tournament
22	2009	Municipal La Pintana	Deportes Quilicura
23	2010	Unión Santa María	Pudahuel Barrancas
24	2011	Deportes Linares	Deportes Valdivia

=== As fifth level of the Chilean League system ===
Ed.	Season	Champion	Runner-up
25	2012	Deportes Santa Cruz	Malleco Unido
26	2013 Transición	Independiente	Tomás Greig
27	2013 Clausura	Deportes Limache	Estrella del Huasco
28	2014	Real San Joaquín	Chimbarongo
29	2015	Deportes Recoleta	Provincial Osorno
30	2016	Provincial Ovalle	Brujas de Salamanca
31	2017	Municipal Santiago	Escuela Macul
32	2018	Pilmahue	Deportes Concepción
33	2019	Rodelindo Román	La Pintana Unida
2020: Canceled due to the pandemic
34	2021	Deportes Quillón	Unión Compañías
35	2022	Santiago City	Comunal Cabrero
36	2023	Imperial Unido	Constitución Unido
37	2024	Aguará	Quintero Unido
38	2025	Deportes Rancagua	Atlético Oriente

== Titles by Team ==
Club	Titles	Runners-up	Seasons won	Seasons runner-up
Juventud O'Higgins	2	1	1985, 1993	1995
Deportes Gasco	1	1	1986	1991
Deportes Quilicura	1	1	2002	2009
Deportes San Bernardo	1	1	1995	2003
Ferroviarios	1	1	2003	1997
Trasandino	1	1	1992	1988
Aguará	1	—	2024	—
Chiprodal de Graneros	1	—	1991	—
C.T.I.	1	—	1999	—
Con Con National	1	—	2001	—
Deportes Limache	1	—	2013 Clausura	—
Deportes Linares	1	—	2011	—
Deportes Polpaico	1	—	1997	—
Deportes Rancagua	1	—	2025	—
Deportes Recoleta	1	—	2015	—
Deportes Santa Cruz	1	—	2012	—
Deportivo Chilectra	1	—	1983	—
Deportivo Pilmahue	1	—	2018	—
Deportes Quillón	1	—	2021	—
Hosanna	1	—	1998	—
Imperial Unido	1	—	2023	—
Independiente	1	—	2013 Transición	—
Luis Matte Larraín	1	—	1994	—
Malloco Atlético	1	—	1996	—
Municipal La Pintana	1	—	2009	—
Municipal Las Condes	1	—	1987	—
Municipal Nogales Melón	1	—	2000	—
Municipal Santiago	1	—	2017	—
Provincial Ovalle	1	—	2016	—
Rodelindo Román	1	—	2019	—
Real San Joaquín	1	—	2014	—
Santiago City	1	—	2022	—
Soinca Bata	1	—	1984	—
Thomas Bata	1	—	1988	—
Tricolor Municipal	1	—	1990	—
Unión Santa María	1	—	2010	—
Unión Veterana	1	—	1989	—
