= 2026 Liga de Primera =

Liga de Primera Mercado Libre
- Season: 2026
- Dates: 30 January – 6 December 2026
- Champions: Colo-Colo (35th title)
- Copa Libertadores: Colo-Colo; Coquimbo Unido (via Copa de la Liga)
- Matches: 223
- Goals: 628 (2.82 per match)
- Top goalscorer: Fernando Zampedri (29 goals)
- Biggest home win: U. de Chile 6–0 Ñublense (12 October)
- Biggest away win: Everton 0–3 Huachipato (13 February); U. de Concepción 0–3 Everton (1 March); Cobresal 2–5 Dep. Limache (15 March); Huachipato 0–3 U. Católica (31 March); Huachipato 1–4 Everton (8 August); Dep. Limache 0–3 Everton (29 August)
- Highest scoring: Colo-Colo 6–2 Ñublense (17 May)
- All statistics correct as of 22 November 2026 (2 of 3 matches finished).

The 2026 Liga de Primera, known as Liga de Primera Mercado Libre 2026 for sponsorship purposes, is the 96th season of the Liga de Primera, Chile's top-flight football league. The season began on 30 January and is scheduled to end on 6 December 2026.

Colo-Colo won their thirty-fifth league title in this season, clinching the championship with three rounds to go after a 2–1 win over Ñublense on 8 November 2026. Coquimbo Unido were the defending champions.

== Format changes ==
Although the competition kept its usual double round-robin format with teams playing each other twice for a total of 30 matchdays, changes were made to the distribution of international berths due to the introduction of a new competition named Copa de la Liga starting from this season.

The Liga de Primera champions and runners-up will still qualify for the group stage of the 2027 Copa Libertadores, whilst the team placing third in the league will face the 2026 Copa Chile champions in a play-off match for a berth into the Copa Libertadores second stage. The teams placing from fourth to sixth will qualify for the 2027 Copa Sudamericana, with the loser of the play-off match between the third-placed team and the Copa Chile champions being entitled to claim the last Copa Sudamericana berth.

== Teams ==
Locations of the 2026 Liga de Primera teams.
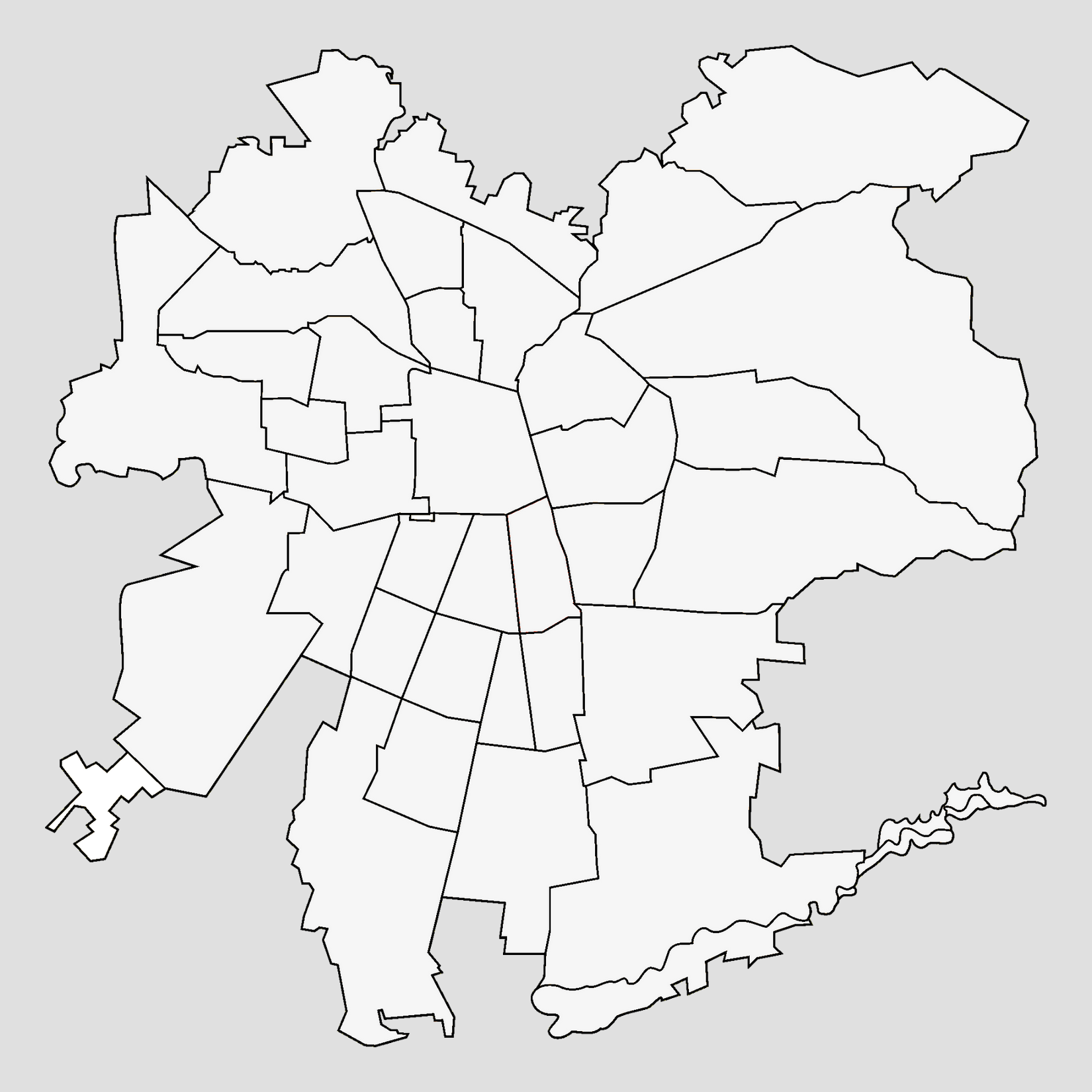
Locations of the 2026 Liga de Primera teams – Santiago.

Sixteen teams take part in the league in this season: the top 14 teams from the 2025 Liga de Primera, plus the 2025 Primera B champions Universidad de Concepción and the winners of the Primera B promotion play-offs Deportes Concepción. Universidad de Concepción returned to the top tier after five years, clinching promotion as well as winning the Primera B tournament with a 3–0 victory over Deportes Copiapó on 1 November 2025, whilst Deportes Concepción confirmed their first promotion to the top flight in 17 years after defeating Cobreloa in the promotion play-off finals on 7 December 2025.

The promoted teams replaced Deportes Iquique, who were relegated after two seasons, and Unión Española, relegated to the second tier after 28 years.

=== Stadia and locations ===
Team	City	Stadium	Capacity
Audax Italiano	Santiago (La Florida)	Bicentenario de La Florida	11,637
Cobresal	El Salvador	El Cobre	11,240
Colo-Colo	Santiago (Macul)	Monumental David Arellano	43,667
Coquimbo Unido	Coquimbo	Francisco Sánchez Rumoroso	15,809
Deportes Concepción	Concepción	Ester Roa Rebolledo	30,448
Deportes La Serena	La Serena	La Portada	17,134
Deportes Limache	Quillota	Lucio Fariña Fernández (Note: Deportes Limache play their home matches at Estadio Municipal Lucio Fariña Fernández in Quillota since their regular stadium Estadio Gustavo Ocaranza in Limache does not meet ANFP requirements.)	7,680
Everton	Viña del Mar	Sausalito	21,754
Huachipato	Talcahuano	Huachipato-CAP Acero	10,032
Ñublense	Chillán	Nelson Oyarzún Arenas	11,319
O'Higgins	Rancagua	El Teniente	12,476
Palestino	Santiago (La Cisterna)	Municipal de La Cisterna	8,000
Unión La Calera	La Calera	Nicolás Chahuán Nazar	8,353
Universidad Católica	Santiago (Las Condes)	Claro Arena	20,249
Universidad de Chile	Santiago (Ñuñoa)	Nacional Julio Martínez Prádanos	46,190
Universidad de Concepción	Concepción	Ester Roa Rebolledo	30,448

=== Personnel and kits ===
Team	Manager	Kit manufacturer	Main shirt sponsors
Audax Italiano	(Argentina) Patricio Graff	Macron	Apuestas Royal, Traverso
Cobresal	(Chile) Gustavo Huerta	KS7	Apuestas Royal, Pullman Bus
Colo-Colo	(Argentina) Fernando Ortiz	Adidas	JugaBet
Coquimbo Unido	(Chile) Hernán Caputto	Capelli Sport	Pin-Up Casino
Deportes Concepción	(Chile) Fernando Díaz	Kelme	Apuestas Royal
Deportes La Serena	(Chile) Felipe Gutiérrez	Fiume	Apuestas Royal
Deportes Limache	(Chile) Víctor Rivero	Claus-7	Apuestas Royal
Everton	(Argentina) Walter Ribonetto	Skechers	Terrawind
Huachipato	(Chile) Jaime García	Marathon	Apuestas Royal
Ñublense	(Chile) Vicente Núñez (caretaker)	Macron	Apuestas Royal
O'Higgins	(Argentina) Lucas Bovaglio	Joma	BC.GAME
Palestino	(Argentina) Guillermo Farré	Capelli Sport	Bank of Palestine
Unión La Calera	(Chile) John Armijo	Givova	Apuestas Royal
Universidad Católica	(Argentina) Daniel Garnero	Puma	BICE
Universidad de Chile	(Argentina) Fernando Gago	Adidas	JugaBet
Universidad de Concepción	(Chile) Cristián Muñoz	Gladiatore (January – April); Macron (May – December)	Apuestas Royal

=== Managerial changes ===
Team	Outgoing manager	Manner of departure	Date of vacancy	Position in table	Incoming manager	Date of appointment
Universidad de Concepción	(Chile) Cristián Muñoz	Resigned	1 December 2025	Pre-season	(Argentina) Juan Cruz Real	16 December 2025
Coquimbo Unido	(Chile) Esteban González	Resigned	6 December 2025	Pre-season	(Argentina) Hernán Caputto	13 December 2025
Palestino	(Argentina) Lucas Bovaglio	End of contract	7 December 2025	Pre-season	(Chile) Cristián Muñoz	19 December 2025
Ñublense	(Chile) Ronald Fuentes	End of contract	8 December 2025	Pre-season	(Chile) Juan José Ribera	18 December 2025
Deportes La Serena	(Argentina) Mario Sciacqua	Sacked	11 December 2025	Pre-season	(Chile) Felipe Gutiérrez	26 December 2025
O'Higgins	(Argentina) Francisco Meneghini	End of contract	22 December 2025	Pre-season	(Argentina) Lucas Bovaglio	27 December 2025
Universidad de Chile	(Argentina) Gustavo Álvarez	Mutual agreement	23 December 2025	Pre-season	(Argentina) Francisco Meneghini	29 December 2025
Everton	(Argentina) Javier Torrente	Sacked	25 February 2026	16th	(Chile) Davis González (Note: Caretaker manager.)	25 February 2026
Everton	(Chile) Davis González	End of caretaker spell	8 March 2026	15th	(Argentina) Walter Ribonetto	10 March 2026
Universidad de Chile	(Argentina) Francisco Meneghini	Sacked	10 March 2026	12th	(Chile) Jhon Valladares	11 March 2026
Universidad de Concepción	(Argentina) Juan Cruz Real	Resigned	10 March 2026	11th	(Argentina) Facundo Gareca	11 March 2026
Deportes Concepción	(Chile) Patricio Almendra	Resigned	13 March 2026	16th	(Argentina) Walter Lemma	17 March 2026
Universidad de Chile	(Chile) Jhon Valladares	End of caretaker spell	20 March 2026	8th	(Argentina) Fernando Gago	20 March 2026
Universidad de Concepción	(Argentina) Facundo Gareca	End of caretaker spell	30 March 2026	5th	(Uruguay) Leonardo Ramos	27 March 2026
Palestino	(Chile) Cristián Muñoz	Sacked	24 April 2026	9th	(Argentina) Guillermo Farré	26 April 2026
Universidad de Concepción	(Uruguay) Leonardo Ramos	Resigned	12 May 2026	12th	(Chile) Ricardo Viveros (Note: Originally as caretaker manager, appointed on a permanent basis on 19 June 2026.)	12 May 2026
Deportes Concepción	(Argentina) Walter Lemma	Mutual agreement	18 May 2026	16th	(Chile) Fernando Díaz (Note: Alejandro Gutiérrez was the caretaker manager for the 13th round match against Huachipato.)	21 May 2026
Audax Italiano	(Argentina) Gustavo Lema	Resigned	20 June 2026	13th	(Argentina) Patricio Graff (Note: Pablo Álvarez was the caretaker manager for the 2026 Copa Chile's 1st, 4th and 2nd matchdays.)	1 July 2026
Universidad de Concepción	(Chile) Ricardo Viveros	Return to the youth setup	4 August 2026	14th	(Chile) Cristián Muñoz	4 August 2026
Unión La Calera	(Argentina) Martín Cicotello	Mutual agreement	8 September 2026	16th	(Chile) Carlos Galdames	8 September 2026
Unión La Calera	(Chile) Carlos Galdames	End of caretaker spell	15 September 2026	16th	(Chile) John Armijo	15 September 2026
Ñublense	(Chile) Juan José Ribera	Sacked	12 October 2026	10th	(Chile) Vicente Núñez	13 October 2026

== Standings ==
Pos	Team	Pld	W	D	L	GF	GA	GD	Pts	Qualification or relegation
1	Colo-Colo (C, Q)	28	20	4	4	62	30	+32	64	Qualification for Copa Libertadores group stage
2	Universidad de Chile (X)	28	16	6	6	48	22	+26	54	Qualification for Copa Libertadores group stage
3	Universidad Católica (X)	28	15	4	9	56	40	+16	49	Qualification for Copa Libertadores play-off
4	Coquimbo Unido (Q)	28	12	5	11	41	37	+4	41	Qualification for Copa Libertadores second stage (Note: Coquimbo Unido qualified for the Copa Libertadores second stage by winning the 2026 Copa de la Liga.)
5	Deportes Limache	27	12	4	11	48	40	+8	40	Qualification for Copa Sudamericana first stage
6	Everton	28	11	7	10	44	37	+7	40	Qualification for Copa Sudamericana first stage
7	Deportes Concepción	28	11	6	11	30	30	0	39	Qualification for Copa Sudamericana first stage
8	Palestino	28	11	5	12	39	39	0	38	
9	Ñublense	28	10	8	10	34	43	−9	38	
10	Deportes La Serena	27	9	10	8	40	42	−2	37	
11	Huachipato	28	10	7	11	35	41	−6	37	
12	O'Higgins	28	9	4	15	32	43	−11	31	
13	Audax Italiano	28	7	9	12	30	39	−9	30	
14	Cobresal	28	8	6	14	42	52	−10	30	
15	Unión La Calera	28	7	6	15	25	43	−18	27	Relegation to Liga de Ascenso
16	Universidad de Concepción	28	7	5	16	24	52	−28	26	Relegation to Liga de Ascenso

Updated to match(es) played on 22 November 2026 (2 of 3 matches finished). Source: Campeonato Chileno, Soccerway
Rules for classification: 1) Points, 2) Playoff game (only if needed to decide championship between two teams), 3) Goal difference, 4) Matches won, 5) Goals for, 6) Away goals for, 7) Red cards, 8) Yellow cards, 9) Drawing of lots.
(C) Champions; (Q) Qualified for the phase indicated; (X) Assured of Copa Sudamericana, but may still qualify for Copa Libertadores

== Results ==
Home \ Away	AUD	CSL	CC	COQ	DCO	DLS	LIM	EVE	HUA	ÑUB	OHI	PAL	ULC	UC	UCH	UDC
Audax Italiano	—	2–1	0–1	0–1	3–0	1–1	2–2	1–0	1–1	2–2	1–0		0–0	3–4	1–2	3–0
Cobresal	3–2	—		3–2	0–2	0–1	2–5	2–2	1–0	0–1	2–3	2–0	4–0	3–2	1–0	1–1
Colo-Colo	5–1	3–0	—	3–1	1–1		3–1	2–0	2–0	6–2	2–2	0–1	1–0	3–0	0–1	6–1
Coquimbo Unido	3–0	3–2	5–2	—	0–1	1–1		2–1	0–1	1–1	0–0	3–1	1–0	1–2	0–1	1–0
Deportes Concepción	0–1	1–1	0–1	1–1	—	3–3	3–2	0–2	2–0	0–2	2–0	1–0	1–1	3–0		1–0
Deportes La Serena		3–3	2–4	0–1	3–1	—	4–1	1–0	0–0	2–1	1–2	1–0	3–0	2–2	0–3	1–1
Deportes Limache	2–0	3–0	3–1	2–3			—	0–3	3–0	2–0	2–1	2–2	4–0	0–2	1–3	3–0
Everton	1–1	3–1	3–4	1–1	0–2	3–2	1–0	—	0–3	0–0		1–2	3–0 (Note: Matches awarded as 3–0 losses for Unión La Calera by forfeit as they breached competition rules by fielding six foreign players, exceeding the quota of five. The original scores in those matches were Unión La Calera 3–1 Cobresal and Everton 0–1 Unión La Calera.)	0–1	0–0	3–1
Huachipato	3–2	3–3	0–0	1–3	0–0	0–0	1–3	1–4	—		2–0	2–1	3–1	0–3	2–1	5–1
Ñublense	1–0		1–2	2–1	0–1	2–2	1–1	1–3	2–2	—	0–2	2–0	2–1	1–2	1–0	2–2
O'Higgins	2–1	1–1	0–1		2–1	1–0	1–3	2–3	0–2	1–0	—	0–1	2–1	1–0	0–1	0–1
Palestino	0–0	4–2	1–1	2–1	0–1	5–1	1–0		5–1	1–1	4–2	—	0–1	2–3	0–0	2–1
Unión La Calera	3–0	0–3	1–2	1–2	1–0	0–1	1–0	1–1	1–0	0–1	3–3	1–2	—	3–1	2–2	
Universidad Católica	1–1	2–0	1–2	3–1	2–0	3–3	3–0	2–2		1–2	3–2	6–1	1–2	—	1–0	5–1
Universidad de Chile	0–0	2–1	1–2	4–2	2–1	4–0	2–2	4–1	2–0	6–0	2–0	2–1		1–0	—	1–1
Universidad de Concepción	0–1	1–0	1–2	1–0	2–1	0–2	0–1	0–3	0–2	2–3	3–2	1–0	0–0		2–1	—

Updated to match(es) played on 22 November 2026 (2 of 3 matches finished). Source: Campeonato Chileno, Soccerway
Legend: Blue = home team win; Yellow = draw; Red = away team win.

== Copa Libertadores play-off ==
The team placing third in the Liga de Primera at the end of the season will play the 2026 Copa Chile champions in a single match, with the winner qualifying for the 2027 Copa Libertadores second stage as Chile 4. The losing side will enter the 2027 Copa Sudamericana first stage as Chile 4.

TBD December 2026
--:-- UTC−3

Liga de Primera third place	v	Copa Chile champions

== Season statistics ==
=== Top scorers ===
As of 22 November 2026 (2 of 3 matches finished)

Rank	Player	Club	Goals
1	(Chile) Fernando Zampedri	Universidad Católica	29
2	(Argentina) Javier Correa	Colo-Colo	18
3	(Chile) Eduardo Vargas	Universidad de Chile	13
3	(Chile) Daniel Castro	Deportes Limache	13
5	(Uruguay) Alan Medina	Everton	12
6	(Argentina) Maximiliano Romero	Colo-Colo	11
7	(Chile) Sebastián Sáez	Unión La Calera	10
7	(Argentina) Lionel Altamirano	Huachipato	10
9	(Argentina) Nelson Da Silva	Palestino	9
9	(Argentina) Nicolás Johansen	Coquimbo Unido	9
9	(Chile) Arnaldo Castillo	O'Higgins	9
9	(Chile) Steffan Pino	Cobresal	9

Source: BeSoccer

=== Hat-tricks ===
Player	For	Against	Result	Date
(Chile) Fernando Zampedri	Universidad Católica	Universidad de Concepción	5–1 (H)	14 June 2026
(Chile) Eduardo Vargas	Universidad de Chile	Everton	4–1 (H)	26 October 2026
(Argentina) Javier Correa	Colo-Colo	Universidad de Concepción	6–1 (H)	30 October 2026

== Attendance ==
=== Average home attendances ===
As of 8 November 2026

Rank	Team	GP	Cumulative	High	Low	Mean
1	Colo-Colo	13	428,634	41,255	21,386	32,972
2	Universidad de Chile	14	322,482	46,000	6,689	23,034
3	Universidad Católica	14	211,398	18,516	10,131	15,100
4	Deportes Concepción	14	128,865	14,709	4,232	9,205
5	Coquimbo Unido (Note: Coquimbo Unido played behind closed doors in round 16 of the championship following a resolution by the Coquimbo Presidential Delegation.)	12	78,522	9,690	3,500	6,544
6	O'Higgins	13	72,667	7,438	4,263	5,590
7	Ñublense	14	69,189	8,881	3,237	4,942
8	Everton (Note: Everton played behind closed doors during the first two rounds of the tournament following an ANFP sanction due to incidents that occurred in 2025.)	12	60,702	9,640	2,493	5,059
9	Universidad de Concepción	13	53,226	16,217	525	4,094
10	Deportes La Serena	14	53,175	8,995	2,185	3,798
11	Huachipato (Note: Huachipato played behind closed doors in round 2 of the championship following a resolution by the Biobío Presidential Delegation.)	12	46,635	18,855	769	3,886
12	Unión La Calera	14	33,329	5,600	1,440	2,381
13	Palestino	13	32,577	4,555	833	2,506
14	Deportes Limache	13	31,278	4,456	1,057	2,406
15	Audax Italiano	14	30,724	4,632	1,045	2,195
16	Cobresal	13	7,267	2,774	221	559
Total		212	1,660,670	46,000	221	7,833

Source: Worldfootball

== See also ==
- 2026 Copa de la Liga
- 2026 Liga de Ascenso
- 2026 Copa Chile
- 2026 Supercopa de Chile
