= 2023 Campeonato Nacional Primera División =

Campeonato Nacional
- Season: 2023
- Dates: 20 January – 9 December 2023
- Champions: Huachipato (3rd title)
- Relegated: Magallanes; Curicó Unido
- Copa Libertadores: Huachipato; Cobresal; Colo-Colo; Palestino
- Copa Sudamericana: Coquimbo Unido; Everton; Universidad Católica; Unión La Calera
- Matches: 240
- Goals: 654 (2.73 per match)
- Top goalscorer: Fernando Zampedri (17 goals)
- Biggest home win: Colo-Colo 6–0 Cobresal (23 September)
- Biggest away win: Palestino 1–5 Cobresal (14 April)
- Highest scoring: Dep. Copiapó 2–5 Colo-Colo (22 January); U. Católica 5–2 Palestino (25 February); Ñublense 2–5 Audax Italiano (24 April); U. de Chile 2–5 O'Higgins (7 August); Dep. Copiapó 4–3 Unión Española (26 August); Cobresal 3–4 Audax Italiano (11 November); Curicó Unido 3–4 Magallanes (26 November); Cobresal 4–3 U. de Chile (3 December)
- Total attendance: 1,362,187
- Average attendance: 5,676

The 2023 Campeonato Nacional de la Primera División del Fútbol Profesional Chileno, known as Campeonato Betsson 2023 for sponsorship purposes until 15 October 2023, was the 93rd season of the Campeonato Nacional, Chile's top-flight football league. The season began on 20 January and ended on 9 December 2023.

Huachipato were the champions, clinching their third league title on the final round of the season with a 2–0 win over Audax Italiano and a 1–0 defeat for Cobresal at the hands of Unión Española on 8 December 2023, regaining the title after 11 years and being the first team from outside Santiago to win the title since 2015. Colo-Colo were the defending champions.

== Teams ==
Locations of the 2023 Chilean Primera División teams.
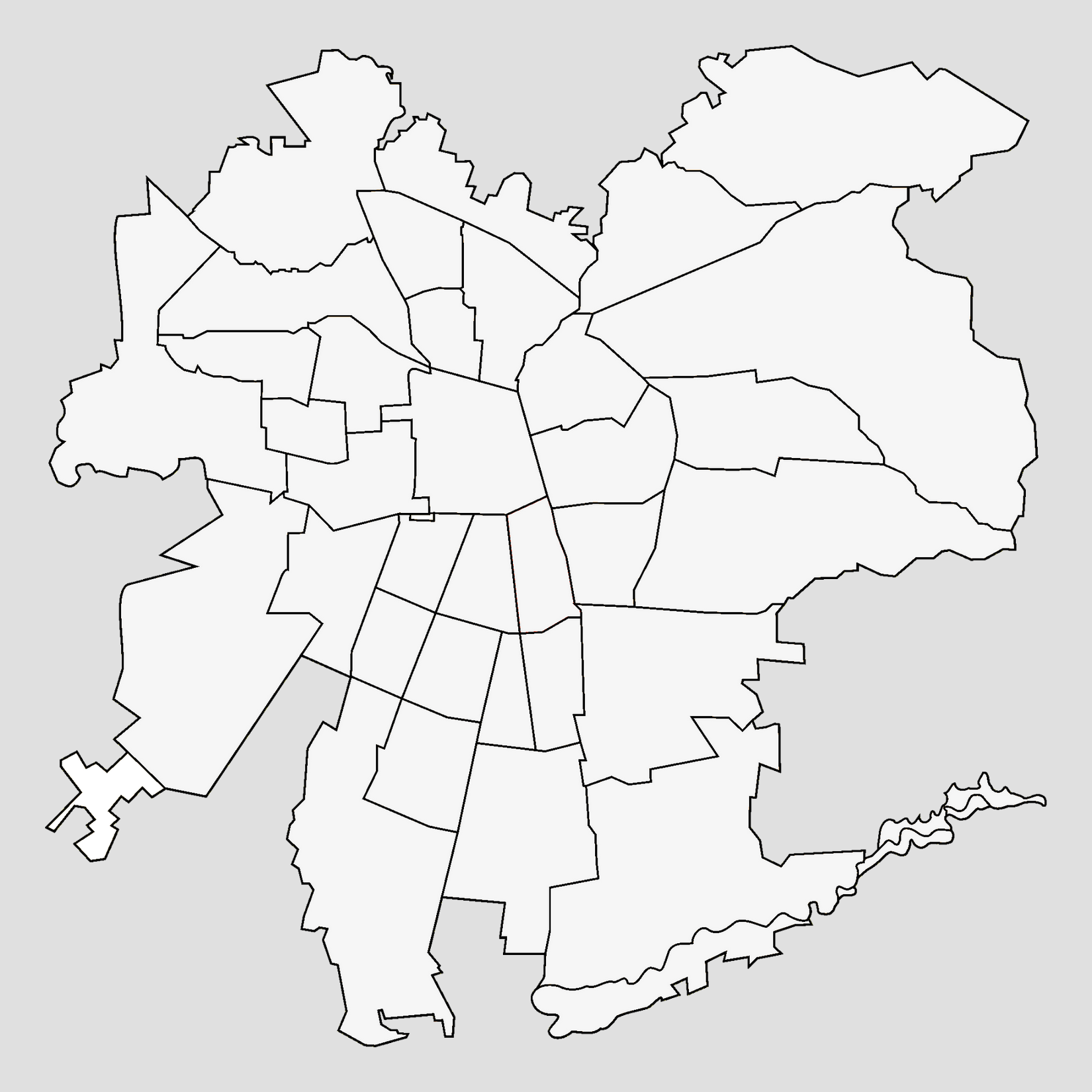
Locations of the 2023 Chilean Primera División teams – Santiago.

16 teams took part in the league in this season: the top 14 teams from the 2022 tournament, plus the 2022 Primera B champions Magallanes and the winners of the promotion play-off Deportes Copiapó. The promoted teams replaced Deportes La Serena and Deportes Antofagasta, who were relegated to Primera B at the end of the 2022 season.

=== Stadia and locations ===
Team	City	Stadium	Capacity
Audax Italiano	Santiago (La Florida)	Bicentenario de La Florida	12,000
Cobresal	El Salvador	El Cobre	12,000
Colo-Colo	Santiago (Macul)	Monumental David Arellano	47,347
Coquimbo Unido	Coquimbo	Francisco Sánchez Rumoroso	18,750
Curicó Unido	Curicó	La Granja	8,278
Deportes Copiapó	Copiapó	Luis Valenzuela Hermosilla	8,000
Everton	Viña del Mar	Sausalito	22,360
Huachipato	Talcahuano	Huachipato-CAP Acero	10,500
Magallanes	Santiago (San Bernardo)	Luis Navarro Avilés	3,500
Ñublense	Chillán	Nelson Oyarzún Arenas	12,000
O'Higgins	Rancagua	El Teniente	13,849
Palestino	Santiago (La Cisterna)	Municipal de La Cisterna	8,000
Unión Española	Santiago (Independencia)	Santa Laura-Universidad SEK	19,000
Unión La Calera	La Calera	Nicolás Chahuán Nazar	9,200
Universidad Católica	Santiago (Las Condes)	San Carlos de Apoquindo (Note: Universidad Católica played their home matches at Estadio Santa Laura-Universidad SEK in Santiago since Estadio San Carlos de Apoquindo was closed for remodeling works.)	14,118
Universidad de Chile	Santiago (Ñuñoa)	Nacional Julio Martínez Prádanos (Note: Universidad de Chile played their home matches at Estadio Santa Laura-Universidad SEK in Santiago since Estadio Nacional Julio Martínez Prádanos was closed for remodeling works for the 2023 Pan American Games.)	48,665

=== Personnel and kits ===
Team	Manager	Kit manufacturer	Sponsors
Audax Italiano	(Chile) Francisco Arrué	Macron	Traverso
Cobresal	(Chile) Gustavo Huerta	KS7	CSI, Pullman Bus
Colo-Colo	(Bolivia) Gustavo Quinteros	Adidas	Coolbet
Coquimbo Unido	(Chile) Fernando Díaz	Siker	Betway
Curicó Unido	(Chile) Miguel Riffo (caretaker)	OneFit	Multihogar
Deportes Copiapó	(Chile) Ivo Basay	Claus-7	Kinross
Everton	(Argentina) Francisco Meneghini	Charly	Claro, Betway, MallMarina
Huachipato	(Argentina) Gustavo Álvarez	KS7	Novibet
Magallanes	(Chile) Mario Salas	Siker	Novibet
Ñublense	(Argentina) Hernán Caputto	OneFit	Betway, IANSA, Copelec
O'Higgins	(Argentina) Juan Manuel Azconzábal	Joma	LatamWin
Palestino	(Argentina) Pablo Sánchez	Capelli Sport	Bank of Palestine
Unión Española	(Chile) Ronald Fuentes	Kappa	Universidad SEK, Starken, SsangYong
Unión La Calera	(Argentina) Martín Cicotello	Siker	Betway
Universidad Católica	(Chile) Nicolás Núñez	Under Armour	BICE
Universidad de Chile	(Argentina) Mauricio Pellegrino	Adidas	Betano

=== Managerial changes ===
Team	Outgoing manager	Manner of departure	Date of vacancy	Position in table	Incoming manager	Date of appointment
Unión La Calera	(Argentina) Federico Vilar	Mutual agreement	6 November 2022	Pre-season	(Argentina) Gerardo Ameli	26 November 2022
Palestino	(Argentina) Gustavo Costas	Signed by Bolivia	7 November 2022	Pre-season	(Argentina) Pablo Sánchez	24 October 2022
Universidad de Chile	(Chile) Sebastián Miranda	Demoted to the youth setup	7 November 2022	Pre-season	(Argentina) Mauricio Pellegrino	29 November 2022
O'Higgins	(Argentina) Mariano Soso	Mutual agreement	7 November 2022	Pre-season	(Argentina) Pablo de Muner	25 November 2022
Audax Italiano	(Chile) Juan José Ribera	End of contract	9 November 2022	Pre-season	(Argentina) Manuel Fernández	14 November 2022
Huachipato	(Chile) Mario Salas	Mutual agreement	10 November 2022	Pre-season	(Argentina) Gustavo Álvarez	15 November 2022
Unión Española	(Chile) Gustavo Canales	Sacked	21 November 2022	Pre-season	(Chile) Ronald Fuentes	22 November 2022
Audax Italiano	(Argentina) Manuel Fernández	Sacked	17 April 2023	15th	(Chile) José Calderón (Note: Caretaker manager.)	17 April 2023
Audax Italiano	(Chile) José Calderón	End of caretaker spell	26 April 2023	13th	(Argentina) Luca Marcogiuseppe	26 April 2023
Unión La Calera	(Argentina) Gerardo Ameli	Sacked	11 May 2023	11th	(Chile) Carlos Galdames	11 May 2023
Magallanes	(Chile) Nicolás Núñez	Resigned	13 May 2023	16th	(Chile) Braulio Leal	15 May 2023
Unión La Calera	(Chile) Carlos Galdames	End of caretaker spell	17 May 2023	13th	(Argentina) Martín Cicotello	17 May 2023
Curicó Unido	(Chile) Damián Muñoz	Sacked	22 May 2023	14th	(Chile) Juan José Ribera	14 June 2023
Magallanes	(Chile) Braulio Leal	End of caretaker spell	26 May 2023	16th	(Chile) Mario Salas	26 May 2023
Universidad Católica	(Argentina) Ariel Holan	Sacked	17 July 2023	8th	(Chile) Rodrigo Valenzuela	18 July 2023
Universidad Católica	(Chile) Rodrigo Valenzuela	End of caretaker spell	24 July 2023	7th	(Chile) Nicolás Núñez	24 July 2023
O'Higgins	(Argentina) Pablo de Muner	Resigned	28 July 2023	13th	(Argentina) Juan Manuel Azconzábal	3 August 2023
Deportes Copiapó	(Argentina) Héctor Almandoz	Mutual agreement	1 August 2023	16th	(Chile) Ivo Basay	1 August 2023
Audax Italiano	(Argentina) Luca Marcogiuseppe	Resigned	4 September 2023	13th	(Chile) Francisco Arrué	15 September 2023
Ñublense	(Chile) Jaime García	Mutual agreement	4 September 2023	12th	(Argentina) Hernán Caputto	15 September 2023
Curicó Unido	(Chile) Juan José Ribera	Resigned	23 September 2023	16th	(Chile) Miguel Riffo	25 September 2023

== Standings ==
Pos	Team	Pld	W	D	L	GF	GA	GD	Pts	Qualification or relegation
1	Huachipato (C)	30	17	6	7	48	30	+18	57	Qualification for Copa Libertadores group stage
2	Cobresal	30	16	8	6	56	39	+17	56	Qualification for Copa Libertadores group stage
3	Colo-Colo (Note: Colo-Colo were deducted three points as punishment for failing to submit evidence of salary payments to the coaching staff in December 2023.)	30	15	9	6	45	29	+16	51	Qualification for Copa Libertadores second stage (Note: Since the 2023 Copa Chile champions Colo-Colo qualified for the Copa Libertadores on league performance and the runners-up Magallanes were relegated, the berth allocated to the Copa Chile champions was transferred to the league's fourth-placed team.)
4	Palestino	30	14	7	9	46	40	+6	49	Qualification for Copa Libertadores second stage
5	Coquimbo Unido	30	14	5	11	43	42	+1	47	Qualification for Copa Sudamericana first stage
6	Everton	30	13	6	11	42	39	+3	45	Qualification for Copa Sudamericana first stage
7	Universidad Católica	30	11	9	10	48	43	+5	42	Qualification for Copa Sudamericana first stage
8	Unión La Calera	30	10	11	9	42	41	+1	41	Qualification for Copa Sudamericana first stage
9	Universidad de Chile	30	11	7	12	40	42	−2	40	
10	Unión Española	30	10	9	11	40	36	+4	39	
11	O'Higgins	30	9	8	13	37	39	−2	35	
12	Ñublense	30	9	8	13	33	39	−6	35	
13	Audax Italiano	30	10	5	15	36	43	−7	35	
14	Deportes Copiapó	30	8	10	12	32	45	−13	34	
15	Magallanes (R)	30	8	5	17	36	49	−13	29	Relegation to Primera B
16	Curicó Unido (R)	30	6	5	19	30	58	−28	23	Relegation to Primera B

Source: ANFP, Soccerway
Rules for classification: 1) Points, 2) Playoff game (only if needed to decide championship between two teams), 3) Goal difference, 4) Matches won, 5) Goals for, 6) Away goals for, 7) Red cards, 8) Yellow cards, 9) Drawing of lots.
(C) Champions; (R) Relegated

== Results ==
Home \ Away	AUD	CSL	CC	COQ	CUR	CDC	EVE	HUA	MAG	ÑUB	OHI	PAL	UE	ULC	UC	UCH
Audax Italiano	—	1–0	0–1	1–1	3–0	3–0	0–1	1–0	0–2	1–0	2–2	0–3	1–1	2–1	1–2	1–2
Cobresal	3–4	—	3–1	3–2	2–0	1–0	3–2	2–0	3–1	1–1	1–0	2–1	0–0	3–1	2–2	4–3
Colo-Colo	2–1	6–0	—	2–3	0–1	1–1	1–1	3–1	2–0	1–0	2–0	3–1	0–2	2–0	2–1	0–0
Coquimbo Unido	3–1	0–3 (Note: Match awarded 3–0 to Cobresal due to Coquimbo Unido fielding an ineligible player. It had originally ended with a 2–1 win for Coquimbo Unido.)	2–2	—	1–0	1–0	0–2	1–2	1–0	1–3	2–1	1–1	3–1	1–2	2–1	2–1
Curicó Unido	2–1	1–2	0–1	1–0	—	1–2	2–3	1–3	3–4	0–3	1–3	0–1	0–1	0–3	2–0	1–3
Deportes Copiapó	1–0	0–3	2–5	1–0	1–1	—	2–0	1–1	2–1	1–1	2–2	1–3	4–3	0–0	1–4	3–1
Everton	3–1	2–2	1–2	2–0	1–1	2–1	—	1–2	2–0	1–0	0–2	2–2	1–0	1–2	0–3	1–2
Huachipato	2–0	2–1	0–1	2–2	3–0	1–0	3–0	—	1–1	2–0	2–0	2–2	1–0	2–3	1–1	1–2
Magallanes	1–2	2–1	1–2	2–3	1–2	0–2	1–4	1–1	—	1–1	0–1	2–0	1–0	1–1	1–1	2–1
Ñublense	2–5	1–2	0–0	1–3	1–2	1–0	1–0	0–1	3–2	—	2–1	1–1	0–1	1–1	1–2	1–1
O'Higgins	2–1	0–0	5–1	0–2	2–2	1–1	1–1	0–1	1–2	1–2	—	0–1	1–1	0–1	0–3	0–1
Palestino	1–1	1–5	1–0	1–1	4–0	2–0	0–2	2–1	3–2	1–2	0–1	—	2–1	1–1	3–0	2–0
Unión Española	3–0	1–0	1–1	2–0	2–2	3–0	1–1	0–1	1–2	0–1	3–3	2–0	—	3–2	2–2	3–0
Unión La Calera	0–0	1–1	0–0	1–2	3–2	1–1	3–2	2–4	2–1	1–1	0–1	2–3	4–0	—	0–3	2–1
Universidad Católica	0–2	3–3	0–0	2–1	3–1	2–2	0–1	1–2	1–0	2–1	0–1	5–2	2–2	1–1	—	1–3
Universidad de Chile	2–0	0–0	1–1	1–2	1–1	0–0	1–2	1–3	2–1	3–1	2–5	0–1	1–0	1–1	3–0	—

Source: ANFP, Soccerway
Legend: Blue = home team win; Yellow = draw; Red = away team win.

== Top scorers ==
Rank	Player	Club	Goals
1	(Argentina) Fernando Zampedri	Universidad Católica	17
2	(Argentina) Rodrigo Holgado	Coquimbo Unido	16
3	(Chile) Patricio Rubio	Ñublense	15
4	(Argentina) Leandro Garate	Unión Española	14
5	(Chile) Alexander Aravena	Universidad Católica	13
6	(Paraguay) Cris Martínez	Huachipato	12
6	(Argentina) Sebastián Sáez	Everton	12
8	(Uruguay) Rodrigo Piñeiro	Unión Española	11
9	(Chile) Misael Dávila	Palestino	10
9	(Argentina) Leandro Fernández	Universidad de Chile	10
9	(Argentina) Gastón Lezcano	Cobresal	10
9	(Argentina) Gonzalo Sosa	Audax Italiano	10
9	(Panama) Cecilio Waterman	Cobresal	10

Source: Soccerway

== Attendances ==
No.	Club	Average
1	Colo-Colo	34,400
2	Universidad de Chile	12,140
3	Universidad Católica	6,684
4	Coquimbo Unido	6,717
5	O'Higgins	6,361
6	Everton	6,441
7	Curicó Unido	4,083
8	Huachipato	4,320
9	Ñublense	5,354
10	Unión Española	3,766
11	Deportes Copiapó	4,822
12	Audax Italiano	3,228
13	Magallanes	2,625
14	Unión La Calera	2,622
15	Palestino	2,079
16	Cobresal	1,083

== See also ==
- 2023 Primera B de Chile
- 2023 Copa Chile
- 2023 Supercopa de Chile
