= Yonathan Andía =

Chilean footballer (born 1992)

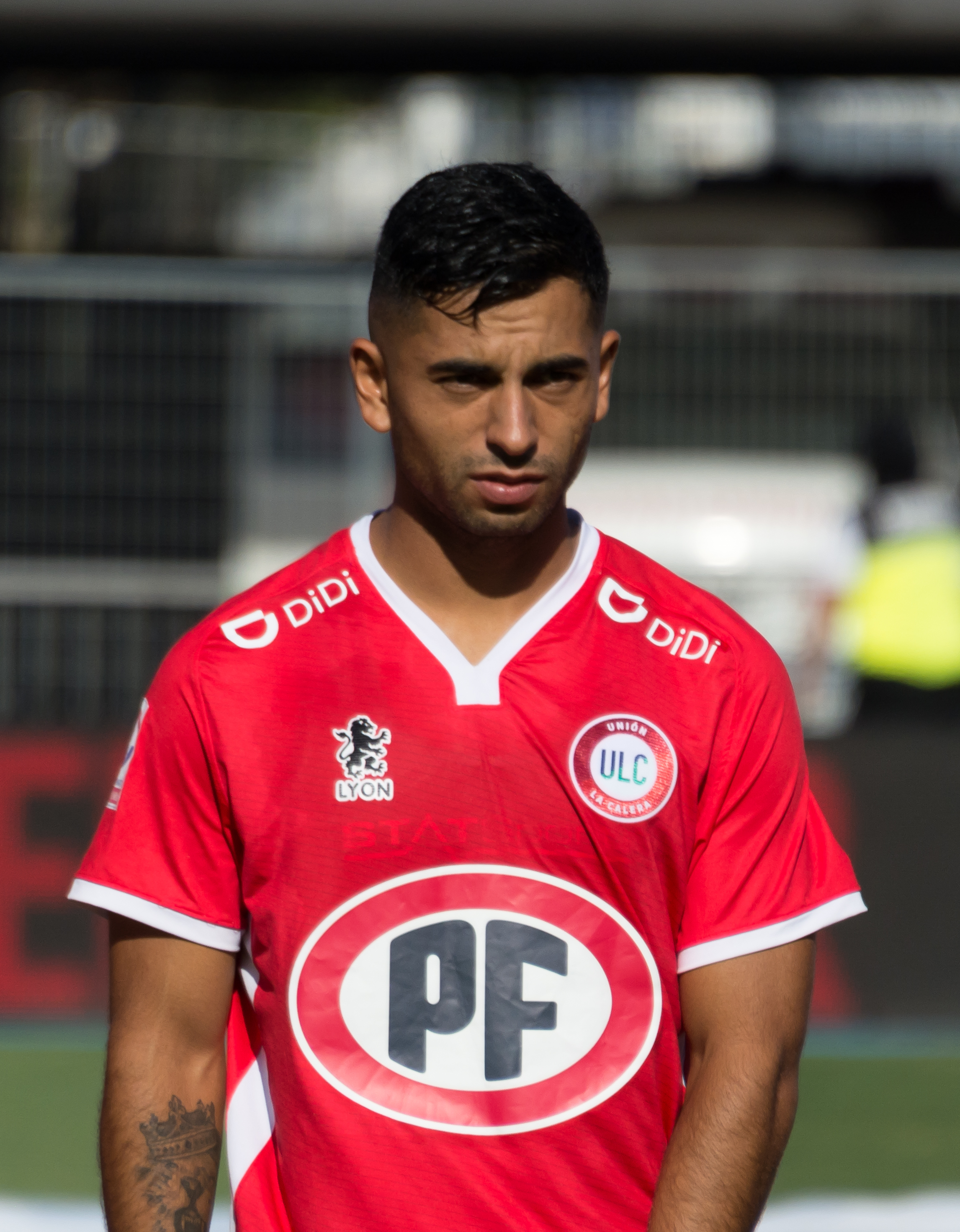
- Andía with Unión La Calera in 2020

Personal information
- Full name: Yonathan Wladimir Andía León
- Date of birth: August 6, 1992 (age 34)
- Place of birth: Santa Bárbara, Chile
- Height: 1.75 m (5 ft 9 in)
- Positions: Right-back; midfielder

Team information
- Current team: Unión La Calera

Youth career
- Escuela Benjamín Muñoz

Senior career*
Years	Team	Apps	(Gls)
2011–2012	Unión Santa María	–	(–)
2013	Deportes Rengo	–	(–)
2014	General Velásquez	–	(–)
2015	Deportes Rengo	–	(–)
2016	Chimbarongo FC	–	(–)
2016	Huertos La Perla	–	(–)
2017	Deportes Limache	–	(–)
2018–2021	Unión La Calera	82	(3)
2021–2023	Universidad de Chile	74	(2)
2024	Deportes Iquique	8	(0)
2024	Deportes Copiapó	8	(0)
2025	Deportes Limache	21	(0)
2026	Iberia	0	(0)
2026–	Unión La Calera	0	(0)

International career
2020	Chile	1	(0)
- * Club domestic league appearances and goals as of 20 April 2026

Yonathan Wladimir Andía León (born August 6, 1992) is a Chilean footballer who plays as a right back for Unión La Calera.

== Club career ==
A product of the Escuela de Fútbol (football academy) Benjamín Muñoz, Andía played for several amateur clubs like Club Deportivo Huertos La Perla at local championships and both the Tercera A and Tercera B, the fourth and the fifth level of the Chilean football, respectively, until he was seen by Víctor Rivero, then manager of Unión La Calera in 2018.

In 2018, Andía signed with Unión La Calera. He arrived as a central midfielder, but the coach Francisco Meneghini turned him on a right back, being a recurring starting player, also appearing in Copa Sudamericana matches in 2019 and 2020.

After being the runner-up at the Campeonato Nacional AFP PlanVital 2020 with Unión La Calera, Andía signed with Universidad de Chile a three-year contract.

In 2024, Andía switched to Deportes Iquique. He left them in August of the same year. In the second half of 2024, he signed with Deportes Copiapó.

In 2025, Andía signed with Deportes Limache.

In February 2026, Andía joined Iberia in the Chilean Tercera B. However, he switched to Unión La Calera to replace Javier Saldías in April of the same year.

== International career ==
He received his first call up to the Chile senior team for the 2022 World Cup qualifiers against Uruguay and Colombia in October 2020, but he made his international debut in a match against Peru on 13 November 2020.

== Personal life ==
Andía is nicknamed Cachorro (Puppy) since he was a child, due to he used to attend to the local amateur matches along with his uncles surnamed León (Lion).

In July 2022, he was involved in legal issues due to that he was arrested after not respecting a red traffic light and drunk driving in La Florida, Santiago. His club, Universidad de Chile, applied him disciplinary bans.
