= Alfonso Sepúlveda =

Chilean footballer (1939–2021)

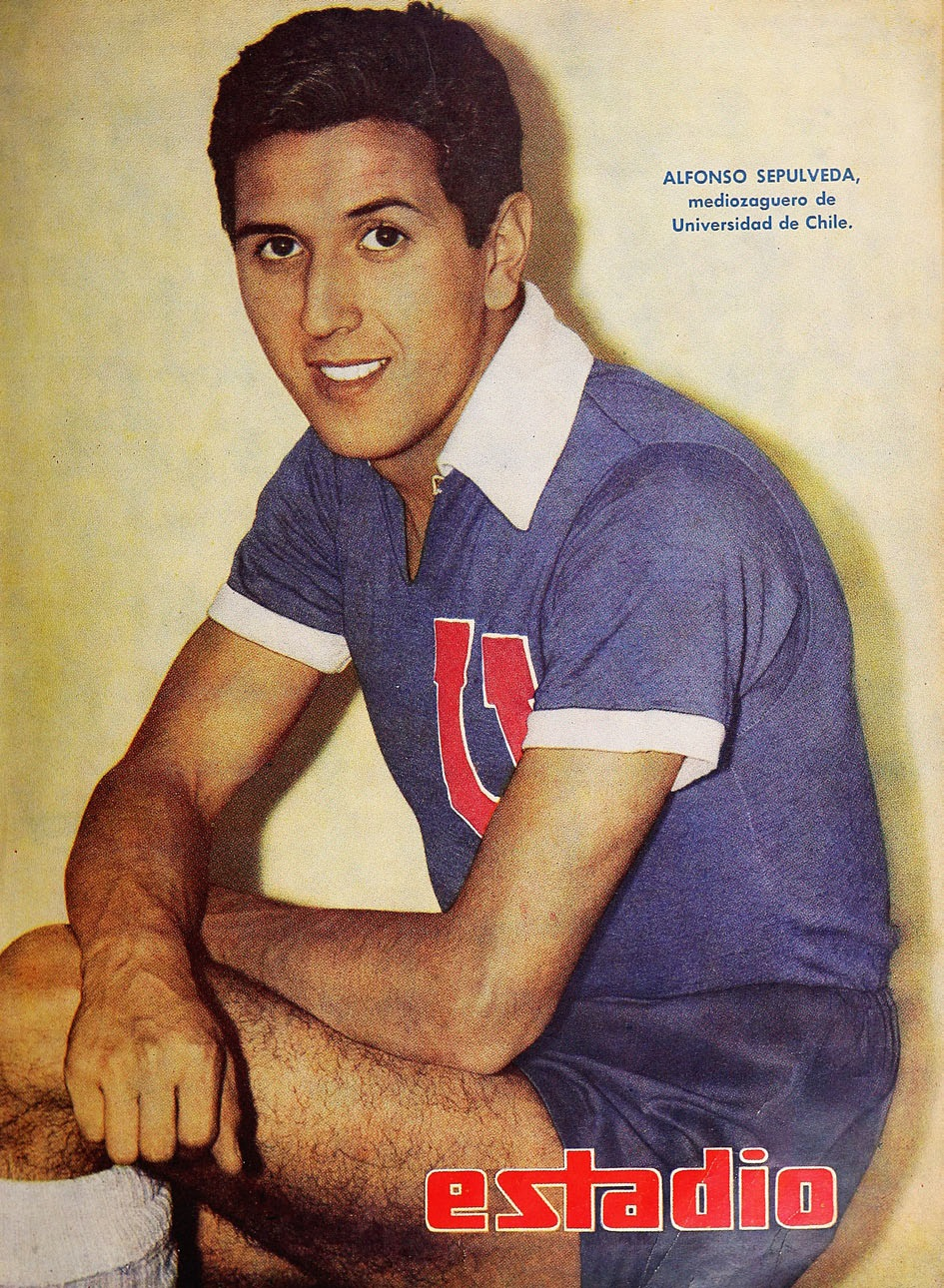
- Sepúlveda in 1960.

Personal information
- Full name: Víctor Alfonso Sepúlveda Torres
- Date of birth: 3 April 1939
- Place of birth: Santiago, Chile
- Date of death: 12 August 2021 (aged 82)
- Place of death: Viña del Mar, Chile
- Position: Midfielder

Senior career*
Years	Team	Apps	(Gls)
1959–1964	Universidad de Chile		
1966–1967	Unión Española		
1968–1970	Huachipato		

International career
1961–1964	Chile	4	(1)

Managerial career
- 1974–1975: The Strongest
- 1976: Deportes Concepción
- 1977–1978: Deportes La Serena
- 1981: Rangers
- 1981–1982: Unión La Calera
- 1983: Deportes Linares
- 1983–1984: Unión La Calera
- 1985–1986: Unión La Calera
- 1986: Deportes Antofagasta
- 1987: Unión La Calera
- 1992: Deportes Puerto Montt
- 1993–1994: Unión La Calera
- 1995–1997: Deportes Puerto Montt
- 1997–1998: Unión La Calera
- * Club domestic league appearances and goals

Víctor Alfonso Sepúlveda Torres (3 April 1939 – 12 August 2021) was a Chilean professional footballer who played as a midfielder.

== Club career ==
Born in Santiago, Sepúlveda began his career with Universidad de Chile, scoring 14 goals in 138 games for the club between 1959 and 1964, which included winning three national championships. He later played for Unión Española and Huachipato. He also earned 4 international caps for the Chile national team, scoring a one goal.

== Coaching career ==
In his coaching career, he is for managing Unión La Calera in different leagues, having been promoted to the Chilean Primera División after winning the 1984 Segunda División de Chile. In addition, he coached Deportes Concepción, Deportes La Serena, Deportes Linares, Rangers, Deportes Antofagasta and Deportes Puerto Montt in Chile and The Strongest in Bolivia.

== Personal life ==
He was nicknamed Chepo.

He was the cousin of the also Chile international footballer, Nelson Torres. In addition, his cousins Jorge Torres, older brother of Nelson, and José Failla Torres were professional footballers: Jorge played for Universidad de Chile and Palestino and José played for Ferrobádminton. Another cousins played football at different levels: Hugo and Rodi Torres, younger brothers of Nelson, and Sergio Torres.

Since 1999 he made his home in Nogales, Chile, spending time as a football commentator for the local radio Radio La Calera. He died in a nursing home in Viña del Mar from heart failure, aged 82.
