= Meneghini =

Meneghini is an Italian surname. Notable people with the surname include:

- Elisa Meneghini (born 1997), Italian artistic gymnast
- Francisco Meneghini (born 1988), Argentine football manager
- Giuseppe Giovanni Antonio Meneghini (1811–1889), Italian botanist, geologist, and paleontologist
