= John Valladares =

Chilean footballer

Personal information
- Full name: John Nicolás Valladares Moya
- Date of birth: 3 September 2003 (age 23)
- Place of birth: La Serena, Chile
- Height: 1.70 m (5 ft 7 in)
- Position: Left winger

Team information
- Current team: Deportes Copiapó

Youth career
- Santiago Wanderers

Senior career*
Years	Team	Apps	(Gls)
2022–2025	Santiago Wanderers	56	(5)
2023	→ Deportes Copiapó (loan)	24	(4)
2026–	Deportes Copiapó	0	(0)
- * Club domestic league appearances and goals as of 12 January 2026

John Nicolás Valladares Moya (born 3 September 2003) is a Chilean footballer who plays as a left winger for Deportes Copiapó.

== Club career ==
Born in La Serena, Chile, Valladares is a product of the Santiago Wanderers youth system and made his professional debut in the 2–0 win against Deportes Puerto Montt on 16 April 2022 for the Primera B under his father, Jhon Valladares, as interim coach.

In 2023, Valladares was loaned out to Deportes Copiapó in the Chilean Primera División. He spent the next two seasons with Santiago Wanderers.

In January 2026, Valladares returned to Deportes Copiapó.

== International career ==
Valladares took part in training microcycles of Chile at under-23 level under Eduardo Berizzo with views to the 2023 Pan American Games.

== Personal life ==
John is the son of the former footballer and current coach of a similar name, Jhon Valladares.
