= Jonathan Domínguez =

Argentine footballer (born 1987)

Personal information
- Date of birth: 19 October 1987 (age 39)
- Place of birth: Buenos Aires, Argentina
- Height: 1.71 m (5 ft 7 in)
- Position: Midfielder

Youth career
- 2004–2007: San Lorenzo

Senior career*
Years	Team	Apps	(Gls)
2008	Deportes La Serena	10	(0)
2009–2010	Unión San Felipe	61	(12)
2011	Unión La Calera	18	(2)
2011	→ FC Brașov (loan)	2	(0)
2012	Coquimbo Unido	17	(2)
2013	Deportes Concepción	10	(1)
2014–2015	Unión San Felipe	12	(0)
2015–2016	Iberia	10	(0)
2016	Tiro y Gimnasia	14	(1)
2017	Independiente Hipolito Yrigoyen	6	(2)
2019	San Francisco Bancario	8	(2)
Total		168	(22)
- * Club domestic league appearances and goals

Jonathan Domínguez (born 19 October 1987) is an Argentine-Chilean former professional footballer who played as a midfielder.

== Career ==
In his early career, Domínguez was with San Lorenzo, but he was released at the end of 2007 and moved to Chilean side Deportes La Serena on 2008. In 2011, he played for Romanian side FC Brașov.

== Personal life ==
He is of Chilean descent and acquired the Chilean nationality.

== Honours ==
Unión San Felipe

- Primera B: 2009
- Copa Chile: 2009
