= Rodrigo Pérez (footballer, born 1996) =

Uruguayan footballer

Personal information
- Full name: Rodrigo Pérez Casada
- Date of birth: 23 July 1996 (age 30)
- Place of birth: Montevideo, Argentina
- Height: 1.80 m (5 ft 11 in)
- Position: Midfielder

Team information
- Current team: Unión La Calera

Youth career
- Fénix

Senior career*
Years	Team	Apps	(Gls)
2016	Fénix	0	(0)
2016–2017	Picerno	30	(5)
2018	Miramar Misiones	12	(0)
2019–2020	Cerrito	36	(1)
2021	Atenas	18	(0)
2022	Boston River	33	(0)
2023–2024	Defensor Sporting	29	(0)
2024	→ Instituto (loan)	11	(0)
2024–2025	Peñarol	27	(1)
2025–2026	Olimpia	17	(0)
2026–	Unión La Calera	0	(0)
- * Club domestic league appearances and goals as of 22 July 2026

Rodrigo Pérez Casada (born 23 July 1996) is a Uruguayan footballer who plays as a midfielder for Chilean club Unión La Calera.

== Career ==
Born in Montevideo, Uruguay, Pérez was trained and started his career with Fénix. In 2016, he moved to Italy to play for Picerno in the Serie D.

Back to Uruguay, Pérez spent seasons with Miramar Misiones, Cerrito, Atenas de San Carlos and Boston River before joining Defensor Sporting in 2023. In January 2024, he was sent on loan to Instituto in the Argentine Primera División.

In August 2024, Pérez joined Uruguayan giant Peñarol as a free agent and the next year he switched to Paraguayan giant Olimpia.

In July 2026, Pérez moved to Chile and signed with Unión La Calera.

== Personal life ==
Pérez holds Italian citizenship.
