= Martín Cicotello =

Argentine footballer

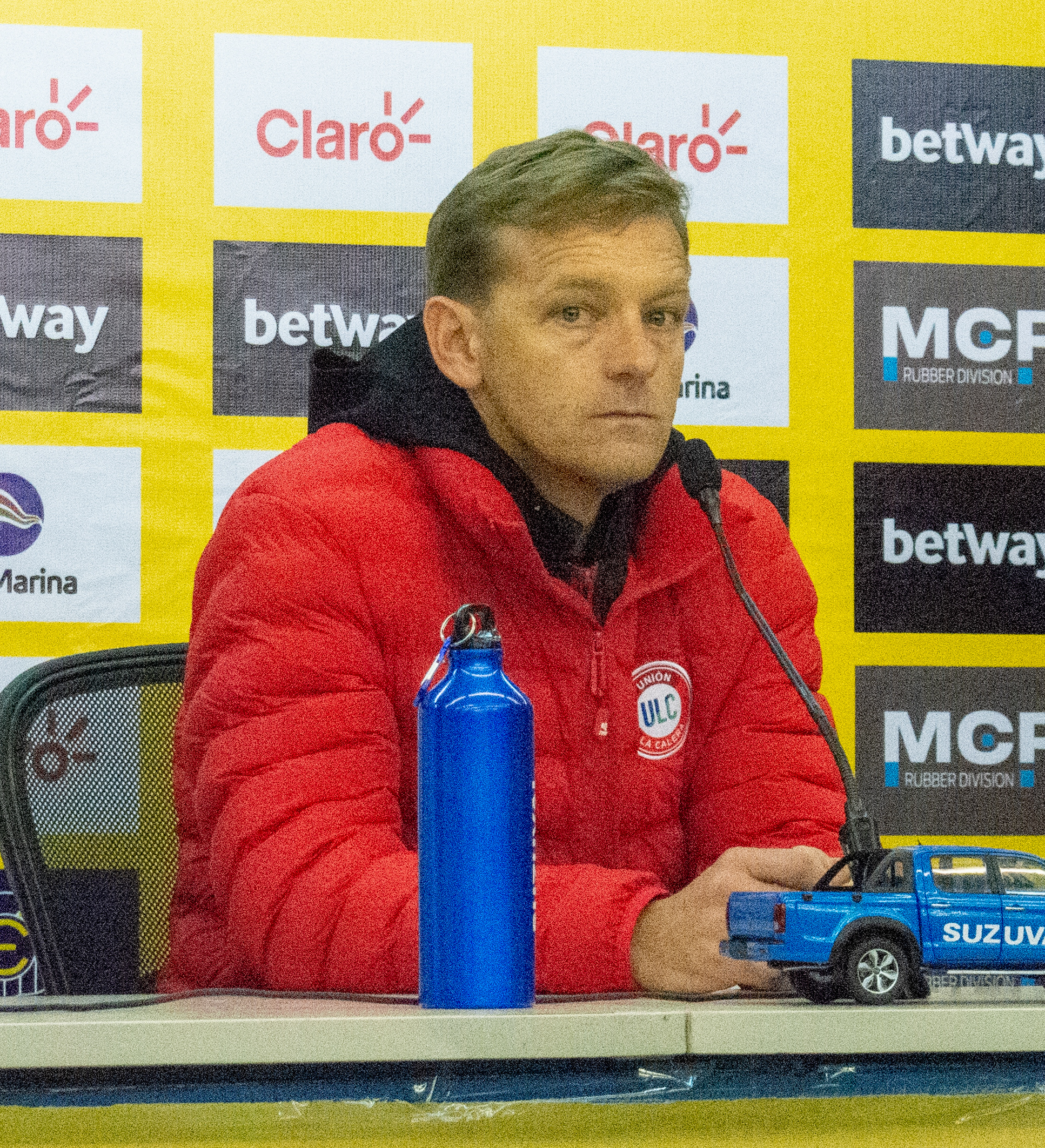
- Cicotello leading Unión La Calera in 2023

Personal information
- Full name: Martín Leonel Cicotello
- Date of birth: 14 May 1981 (age 45)
- Place of birth: Santa Fe, Argentina
- Height: 1.83 m (6 ft 0 in)
- Position: Forward

Youth career
- 1998–2002: Unión de Santa Fe

Senior career*
Years	Team	Apps	(Gls)
2002–2004	Sporting Genzano	60	(30)
2004–2005	Lavello	6	(0)
2005–2006	Real Altamura	34	(18)
2006–2007	Fasano	14	(8)
2007–2008	Spal Lanciano		(15)
2008–2009	L'Aquila		
2009–2010	Fermana	34	(7)
2010	Mosciano		
2011	Turris		
2011–2012	Correggese		

Managerial career
- 2013–2014: Deportivo Español (youth)
- 2014: San Jorge de Tucumán (assistant)
- 2014–2015: Sancheong HS
- 2015: Central Norte (assistant)
- 2016: San Telmo (youth)
- 2016–2017: All Boys (assistant)
- 2017: Juan Aurich (assistant)
- 2017–2018: Unión de Santa Fe (youth)
- 2018–2019: Universidad de Chile (assistant)
- 2019–2021: Newell's Old Boys (assistant)
- 2021–2022: Huracán (assistant)
- 2022: Defensa y Justicia (reserves)
- 2023: Arsenal de Sarandí
- 2023: Unión La Calera
- 2024: Independiente Rivadavia
- 2025: Montevideo City Torque
- 2025–2026: Unión La Calera
- * Club domestic league appearances and goals

Martín Leonel Cicotello (born 14 May 1981) is an Argentine football manager and former player who played as a forward.

== Playing career ==
Born in Santa Fe, Cicotello was a youth graduate of hometown side Unión de Santa Fe. Due to his Italian passport, he moved to the country in 2002, and started playing for Eccellenza side Sporting Genzano.

Aside from a one-year spell at Serie D side Lavello, Cicotello only played for Eccellenza sides during his career. He represented Real Altamura, Fasano, Spal Lanciano, L'Aquila, Fermana, Mosciano, Turris and Correggese.

== Coaching career ==
After retiring, Cicotello returned to his native country and joined Deportivo Español in 2013, as a youth coach. He left the club in the following year to work as an assistant manager at San Jorge de Tucumán, and later moved to South Korea to coach Sancheong HS.

Back to Argentina in 2015, Cicotello was an assistant at Central Norte, before joining San Telmo's youth sides in the following year. In September 2016, he was named as an assistant of José Santos Romero at All Boys, while being in charge of the reserve team.

Cicotello left All Boys in May 2017, and joined Christian Lovrincevich's staff at Peruvian side Juan Aurich, as his assistant. In November, however, he returned to his native country to become a youth coordinator at his first club Unión.

Cicotello left Unión on 28 May 2018, and subsequently became one of Frank Darío Kudelka's assistants at Universidad de Chile. He continued to work with Kudelka at Newell's Old Boys and Huracán, also acting as an interim manager of the latter in April 2021 after Kudelka tested positive for COVID-19.

On 24 November 2022, Cicotello was appointed manager of the reserve side of Defensa y Justicia. The following 2 January, however, he became the manager of Arsenal de Sarandí along with Carlos Ruiz, after his former duo Luca Marcogiuseppe resigned.

Cicotello and Ruiz resigned from Arsenal on 8 May 2023, and he moved to Chile nine days later, after being named in charge of Unión La Calera. Despite qualifying the club to the 2024 Copa Sudamericana, he left on 9 December.

On 29 February 2024, Cicotello returned to his home country after being appointed manager of Independiente Rivadavia in the top tier. He resigned from the club on 25 August.

On 23 December 2024, Cicotello was announced as manager of Uruguayan club Montevideo City Torque for the upcoming season. The following 5 July, he was sacked.

In September 2025, Cicotello returned to led Chilean club Unión La Calera. They ended the contract by mutual agreement on 9 September 2026.
