= Jorge Ampuero =

Chilean footballer (born 1987)

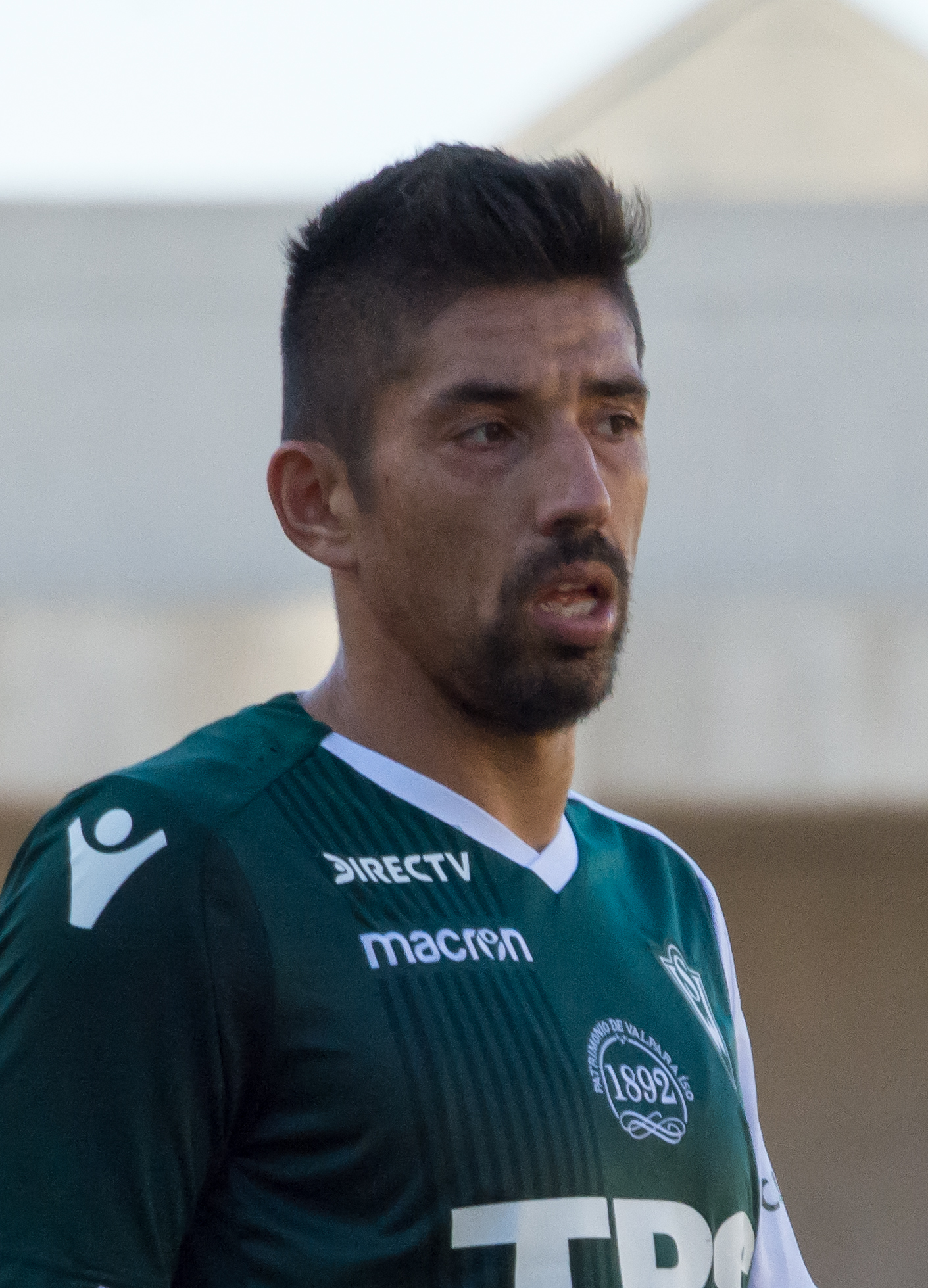
- Ampuero with Santiago Wanderers in 2019.

Personal information
- Full name: Jorge Enrique Ampuero Cabello
- Date of birth: 17 April 1987 (age 39)
- Place of birth: Santiago, Chile
- Height: 1.83 m (6 ft 0 in)
- Position: Centre-back

Youth career
- Unión Española

Senior career*
Years	Team	Apps	(Gls)
2006–2018	Unión Española	258	(14)
2008	→ Deportes Melipilla (loan)	2	(0)
2011	→ Unión La Calera (loan)	36	(1)
2019	Santiago Wanderers	9	(2)
2020–2021	Ñublense	24	(0)
2021	Rodelindo Román	11	(0)
Total		340	(17)
- * Club domestic league appearances and goals

Jorge Enrique Ampuero Cabello (born 17 April 1987) is a Chilean former footballer who played as a centre-back.

== Career ==
He is commonly known for having played at Unión Española.

In 2021, he played for Chilean Segunda División side Rodelindo Román. He retired at the end of the season.

== Personal life ==
Since 2021, Ampuero and his father have a construction company called Constructora Sagrada Familia (Holy Family Construction). At the same time he played for Rodelindo Román, he worked in the construction field.

== Honours ==
Unión Española

- Primera División (1): 2013 Transición
- Supercopa de Chile (1): 2013

Santiago Wanderers

- Primera B (1): 2019

Ñublense

- Primera B (1): 2020
