= 1961 Campeonato Nacional Segunda División =

Segunda División
- Season: 1961
- Champions: Unión La Calera
- Promoted: Unión La Calera; Unión San Felipe
- Relegated: None
- Top goalscorer: José Borello (20 goals); Ñublense

The 1961 Segunda División de Chile was the 10th season of the Segunda División de Chile.

Unión La Calera was the tournament's champion.

== Table ==
Pos	Team	Pld	W	D	L	GF	GA	GD	Pts
1	Unión La Calera (C, P)	22	14	6	2	60	24	+36	34
2	Unión San Felipe (P)	22	12	9	1	51	24	+27	33
3	Trasandino	22	11	5	6	52	41	+11	27
4	La Serena	22	9	8	5	47	30	+17	26
5	Ñublense	22	9	7	6	49	35	+14	25
6	Magallanes	22	9	7	6	37	33	+4	25
7	Universidad Técnica del Estado	22	9	4	9	36	37	−1	22
8	Coquimbo Unido	22	9	3	10	41	45	−4	21
9	Deportes Colchagua	22	8	2	12	50	52	−2	18
10	Lister Rossel	22	5	5	12	30	55	−25	15
11	San Bernardo Central	22	3	5	14	28	54	−26	11
12	Iberia	22	2	3	17	20	71	−51	7

Source: rsssf.com
(C) Champions; (P) Promoted

== See also ==
- Chilean football league system
