= Nicolás Ferreyra (footballer, born 1996) =

Argentine footballer

Personal information
- Full name: Brian Nicolás Ferreyra
- Date of birth: 11 November 1996 (age 29)
- Place of birth: Oliva, Argentina
- Height: 1.89 m (6 ft 2 in)
- Position: Striker

Team information
- Current team: Unión La Calera (on loan from Gimnasia de Mendoza)

Youth career
- 2012–2013: Vélez Sarsfield
- 2013–2017: Belgrano

Senior career*
Years	Team	Apps	(Gls)
2017	Belgrano	0	(0)
2017	Sarmiento La Banda	16	(7)
2018–2019	Atenas Río Cuarto	–	(–)
2019–2021	Defensores Unidos	22	(5)
2020–2021	→ Almagro (loan)	11	(1)
2021–2025	Colegiales	20	(4)
2022	→ Estudiantes RC (loan)	0	(0)
2022	→ Flandria (loan)	35	(5)
2023	→ Estudiantes BA (loan)	7	(0)
2023–2024	→ Deportivo Madryn (loan)	50	(12)
2025	→ Gimnasia de Mendoza (loan)	35	(10)
2026–	Gimnasia de Mendoza	10	(0)
2026–	→ Unión La Calera (loan)	0	(0)
- * Club domestic league appearances and goals as of 13 August 2026

Brian Nicolás Ferreyra (born 11 November 1996), known as Nicolás Ferreyra, is an Argentine footballer who plays as a striker for Chilean Primera División club Unión La Calera on loan from Gimnasia y Esgrima de Mendoza.

== Career ==
Born in Oliva, Argentina, Ferreyra was trained at Vélez Sarsfield and Belgrano. He started his career with Sarmiento de La Banda in 2017 and later he played for Atenas de Río Cuarto, Defensores Unidos and Almagro before joining Colegiales in 2021.

After playing for Colegiales in 2021, Ferreyra was sent on loan to Estudiantes de Río Cuarto, Flandria, Estudiantes de Buenos Aires, Deportivo Madryn and Gimnasia y Esgrima de Mendoza. He helped Gimnasia de Mendoza to win the 2025 Primera Nacional and get promotion to the Argentine Primera División.

Ferreyra continued with Gimnasia de Mendoza in the 2026 season. In August of the same year, he moved abroad by first time and joined Chilean Primera División club Unión La Calera on a loan until December.
