= Walter Lemma =

Argentine football manager (born 1973)

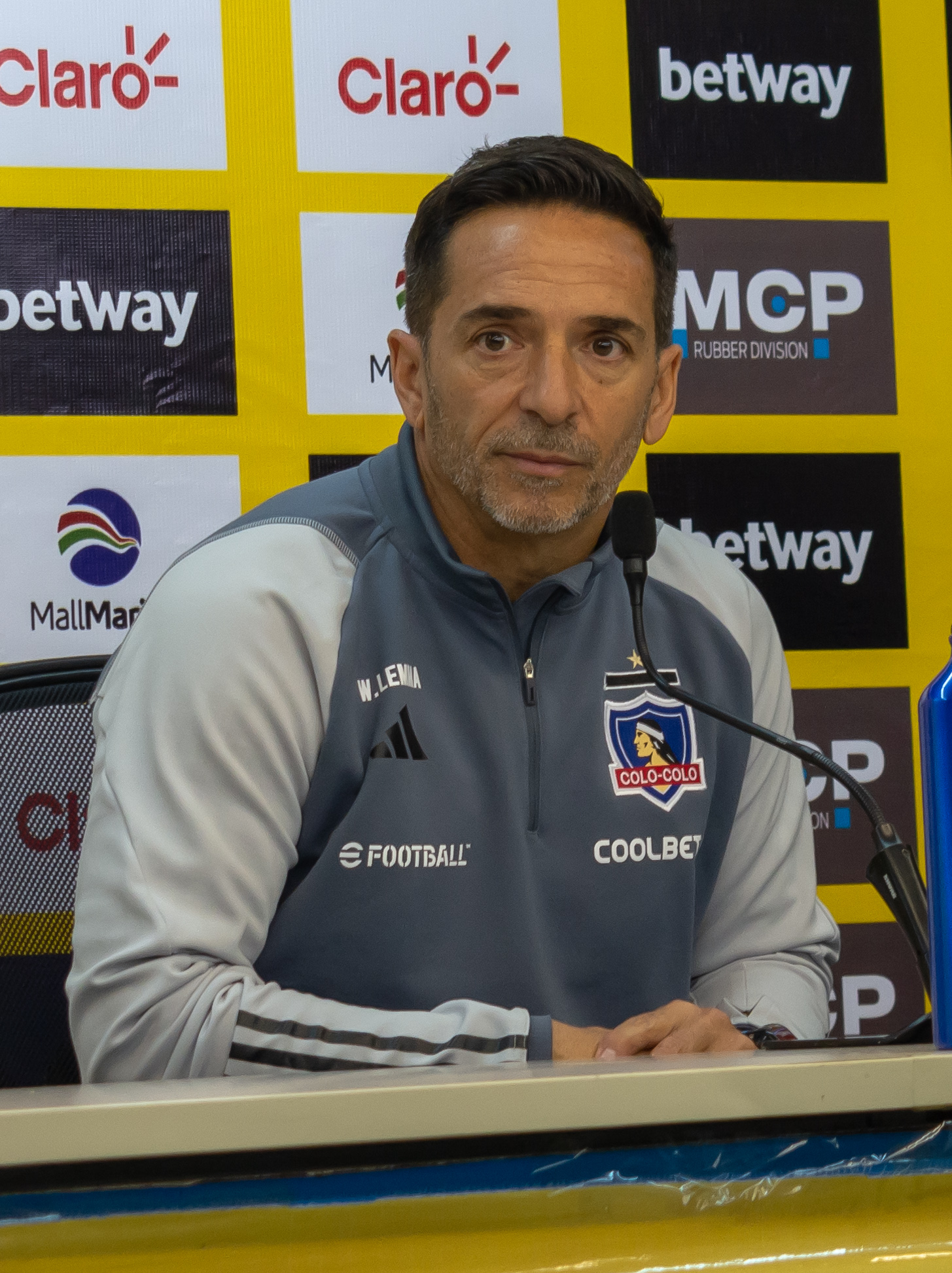
- Lemma in 2023

Personal information
- Full name: Walter Oscar Lemma
- Date of birth: 6 March 1973 (age 53)
- Place of birth: Lanús, Argentina
- Position: Midfielder

Youth career
- Lanús

Senior career*
Years	Team	Apps	(Gls)
1991–1995	Lanús	94	(3)
1995	Estudiantes LP	7	(0)
1996–1997	Banfield	29	(1)
1998–1999	Ancona		
1999–2000	Virtus Entella		
2000–2001	San Martín SJ	8	(0)

Managerial career
- 2009–2014: Lanús (youth)
- 2015–2017: Talleres (youth)
- 2017–2019: Talleres (reserves)
- 2020: Tijuana (assistant)
- 2020–2023: Colo-Colo (assistant)
- 2024: Vélez Sarsfield (assistant)
- 2024–2025: Unión La Calera
- 2026: Deportes Concepción
- * Club domestic league appearances and goals

Walter Oscar Lemma (born 6 March 1973) is an Argentine football manager and former player who played as a midfielder. He was recently the manager of Chilean club Deportes Concepción.

== Playing career ==
Born in Lanús, Buenos Aires Province, Lemma made his senior debut with hometown side Lanús before moving to Estudiantes de La Plata in 1995. In the following year, after being rarely used, he joined Banfield.

After spells at Italian clubs Ancona and Virtus Entella, Lemma returned to his home country in 2000 with San Martín de San Juan. He retired in the following year, aged 28.

== Managerial career ==
Lemma began his managerial career in 2009, after being named in charge of the youth sides of his first club Lanús. He moved to Talleres in 2015 under the same role, before replacing Lucas Bovaglio at the helm of the latter's reserve team on 21 July 2017.

On 18 December 2019, Lemma left Talleres to become Gustavo Quinteros' assistant at Liga MX side Tijuana. He followed Quinteros to Colo-Colo and Vélez Sarsfield, also as his assistant.

On 5 June 2024, Lemma was presented as manager of Unión La Calera in Chile, which was his first managerial experience. He was released on 2 September 2025. In March 2026, he took in charge Deportes Concepción.

== Managerial statistics ==
As of match played 17 May 2026

Managerial record by team and tenure
Team	Nat	From	To	Record							
Team	Nat	From	To	G	W	D	L	GF	GA	GD	Win %
Unión La Calera	(Chile)	5 June 2024	2 September 2025	48	16	12	20	45	54	−9	33.33
Deportes Concepción	(Chile)	17 March 2026	19 May 2026	10	1	2	7	9	18	−9	10.00
Total				58	17	14	27	54	72	−18	29.31
