= Salvador Biondi =

Argentine football player and manager

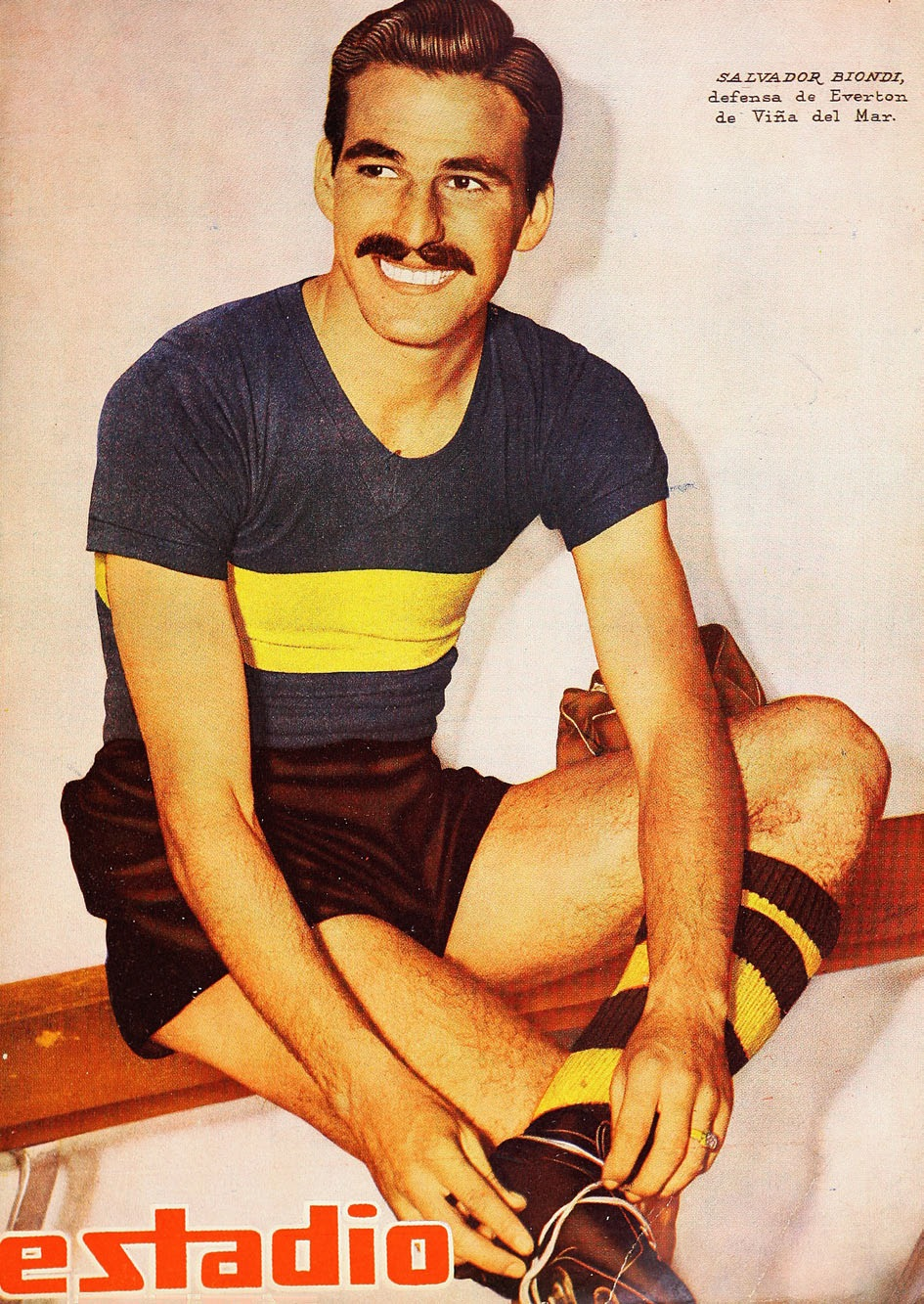
- Biondi in 1950

Personal information
- Full name: Rodolfo Salvador Biondi Logguzzo
- Date of birth: 24 January 1926
- Place of birth: Villa Urquiza, Buenos Aires, Argentina
- Date of death: 24 November 2016 (aged 90)
- Place of death: Santiago, Chile
- Position: Midfielder

Senior career*
Years	Team	Apps	(Gls)
1943	Acassuso	17	(0)
1945–1947	Boca Juniors	3	(0)
1948–1950	Everton		
1951	Platense	5	(0)
1952	Everton		
1953	Boca Juniors	0	(0)
1954	Everton		
1955	Unión La Calera		
1956	Deportes La Serena		
1957	Unión La Calera		

Managerial career
- 1958: Unión La Calera
- 1959–1963: Everton
- 1964: Unión La Calera
- 1965–1966: Audax Italiano
- 1967: Unión La Calera
- 1968–1969: Chile (assistant)
- 1969: Chile (caretaker)
- 1969: Cadetes ACF
- 1969: Magallanes
- 1969–1970: Audax Italiano
- 1974: Unión San Felipe
- 1975: Unión La Calera
- 1976: Huachipato
- 1978–1979: Ferroviarios
- 1979: Audax Italiano
- 1980: Universidad de Chile (youth)
- 1981: Iberia-Bío Bío
- 1982: Audax Italiano (assistant)
- 1983: Santiago Wanderers (assistant)
- 1983: Santiago Wanderers (interim)
- 1984: Cadetes V Región
- 1986–1994: Universidad de Chile (youth)
- * Club domestic league appearances and goals

Rodolfo Salvador Biondi Logguzzo (24 January 1926 – 24 November 2016), known as Salvador Biondi, was an Argentine football midfielder and manager.

== Playing career ==
A midfielder, Biondi played for Acassuso before playing for Boca Juniors from 1945 to 1947. He returned to Boca Juniors in 1953 to make appearances in friendlies. In his homeland, he also played for Platense in 1951.

Biondi is better known by his stints with Chilean club Everton de Viña del Mar with whom he won the league titles in 1950 and 1952 as the team captain.

In his last seasons, Biondi played for Unión La Calera and Deportes La Serena in the Chilean Segunda División.

== Coaching career ==
=== Senior clubs ===
Following his retirement as a player, Biondi started his career as manager of Unión La Calera in 1958 in the Chilean Segunda División. In that division, he coached them again in 1975 and also Ferroviarios in 1978–79 and Iberia-Bío Bío in 1981.

In the Chilean Primera División, Biondi led Everton, Unión La Calera, Audax Italiano, Magallanes, Unión San Felipe, Huachipato and Santiago Wanderers. As important landmarks, he made possible the professional debuts of the historical Chilean players Elías Figueroa with Unión La Calera in 1964 and Carlos Reinoso with Audax Italiano in 1965 and passed the signing of Oscar Fabbiani with Unión San Felipe in 1974. He also served as assistant coach for Audax Italiano and Santiago Wanderers in 1982 and 1983, respectively.

=== National team ===
Biondi served as assistant coach of Salvador Nocetti for the Chile national team in 1968 and 1969. He led the team in two friendly matches: a 2-1 loss against Argentina on 11 June 1969 and a 0–0 draw against Paraguay on 6 July 1969.

In 1969, Biondi also coached a team made up by youth players from clubs belonging to the Asociación Central de Fútbol (ACF) (Central Football Association of Chile).

=== Youth teams ===
Biondi is well known as coach of the Universidad de Chile youth ranks from 1986 to 1994. He passed the signing of historical players such as Marcelo Salas and Sergio Vargas.

In 1984, he also coached a team made up by youth players from clubs in the Chilean Segunda División based in Valparaíso Region for the Copa Polla Gol de Segunda.

== Personal life ==
Son of María Loguzzo and Mariano Biondi, Salvador was nicknamed Tano due to his Italian descent.

His son, Ricardo, is a Chilean former football goalkeeper who played for several clubs in his homeland and the Chile national B-team.
