= Francisco Bahamondes =

Chilean footballer (born 1988)

Personal information
- Full name: Francisco Javier Bahamondes Galea
- Date of birth: 7 April 1988 (age 38)
- Place of birth: La Calera, Chile
- Height: 1.77 m (5 ft 9 1/2 in)
- Position: Left back

Youth career
- Unión La Calera

Senior career*
Years	Team	Apps	(Gls)
2010–2015	Unión La Calera	125	(5)
2014	→ Everton (loan)	30	(1)
2015	Deportes Iquique	24	(1)
2016–2017	Rangers	7	(0)
2017	San Marcos	13	(1)
2018	Unión San Felipe	18	(0)
2019–2021	San Luis	25	(1)
Total		242	(9)
- * Club domestic league appearances and goals

Francisco Javier Bahamondes Galea (born 7 April 1988) is a Chilean former footballer who played as a left back.

== Career ==
He developed his career in his country of birth playing for Unión La Calera, Everton de Viña del Mar, Deportes Iquique, Rangers de Talca, San Marcos de Arica, Unión San Felipe and San Luis de Quillota.

He retired at the end of the 2020 season, which ended in January 2021, as a player of San Luis de Quillota.
