= Jhon Valladares =

Chilean footballer (born 1980)

Personal information
- Full name: Jhon Cristofer Valladares Contreras
- Date of birth: 24 March 1980 (age 46)
- Place of birth: San Javier de Loncomilla, Chile
- Height: 1.76 m (5 ft 9 in)
- Position: Centre-back

Team information
- Current team: Universidad de Chile (interim)

Youth career
- 5 de Abril
- Universidad de Chile

Senior career*
Years	Team	Apps	(Gls)
2001–2002	Universidad de Chile		
2003	Deportes La Serena		
2004	Unión San Felipe		
2005	Audax Italiano		
2006–2008	Deportes Melipilla		
2008–2011	San Luis		
2009	→ Santiago Wanderers (loan)		
2012	Coquimbo Unido		

International career
1997	Chile U17		

Managerial career
- Santiago Wanderers (youth)
- 2022: Santiago Wanderers (interim)
- 2024–: Universidad de Chile (youth)
- 2026–: Universidad de Chile (interim)
- * Club domestic league appearances and goals

Jhon Cristofer Valladares Contreras (born 24 March 1980), frequently named John Valladares, is a Chilean football manager and former player who played as a centre-back. He is the current interim manager of Universidad de Chile.

== Career ==
A product of Universidad de Chile, Valladares was a member of the squad that won the league title in 2000. He developed his entire career in his homeland, playing also for Deportes La Serena, Unión San Felipe, Audax Italiano, Deportes Melipilla, San Luis, Santiago Wanderers and Coquimbo Unido.

At international level, he represented the Chile national under-17 team in the 1997 South American Championship.

As a football manager, he began his career at the Santiago Wanderers youth ranks. In 2022, he assumed as the interim coach of the first team.

In 2024, he joined the Universidad de Chile youth system as coach of the under-18's.

== Personal life ==
He is the father of the football winger of a similar name, John Valladares, who made his professional debut under his father with Santiago Wanderers in 2022.

== Honours ==
=== Player ===
Universidad de Chile

- Primera División de Chile (1): 2000
- Copa Chile (1): 2000

Deportes Melipilla

- Primera B (1): 2006
