= Manuel Fernández (Argentine footballer) =

Argentine football manager (born 1983)

Personal information
- Date of birth: 31 October 1983 (age 42)
- Place of birth: San Carlos de Bolívar, Argentina
- Position: Midfielder

Team information
- Current team: Tigres UANL (assistant)

Youth career
- Empleados de Comercio
- 2001–2002: Deportivo Morón

Senior career*
Years	Team	Apps	(Gls)
2002–2003	Empleados de Comercio		
2003–2004	Sportivo Barracas	8	(0)
2005	San Telmo	1	(0)
2005	Deportivo Riestra	4	(1)
2006–2007	Sportivo Barracas	31	(1)
2007–2008	Redován		

Managerial career
- 2009–2012: Tigre (youth)
- 2012: Central Norte (youth)
- 2013–2016: Racing Club (youth)
- 2016–2017: Unión Española (assistant)
- 2017–2018: Defensa y Justicia (reserves)
- 2017: Defensa y Justicia (interim)
- 2018: Sport Boys
- 2019: Sport Boys
- 2019–2021: Agropecuario
- 2022: Ferro Carril Oeste
- 2022: Alvarado
- 2023: Audax Italiano
- 2023: Ciudad de Bolívar
- 2024: Unión La Calera
- 2024: Chacarita Juniors
- 2025–2026: Tigres UANL (assistant)
- * Club domestic league appearances and goals

Manuel Fernández (born 31 October 1983) is an Argentine football manager and former player who played as a midfielder.

== Playing career ==
Born in San Carlos de Bolívar, Buenos Aires Province, Fernández began his career with hometown side Empleados de Comercio before joining Deportivo Morón at the age of 17. Upon returning to his hometown, he made his senior debut with Empleados before moving to Sportivo Barracas.

Fernández subsequently played for San Telmo and Deportivo Riestra before returning to Barracas in 2006. In the following year, he moved abroad with Spanish side FB Redován CF in the Primera Regional de la Comunidad Valenciana, but retired in 2008 at the age of just 25 after a knee injury.

== Managerial career ==
After retiring, Fernández joined Fabio Radaelli's staff at Tigre's youth categories, and later worked for six months with Central Norte. He then rejoined Radaelli at Racing Club, being in charge of the club's youth sides.

On 2 February 2016, Fernández moved to Chile and joined Martín Palermo's staff at Unión Española. In June 2017, he returned to managerial duties after taking over the reserve side of Defensa y Justicia, and was named interim manager of the first team on 25 September, after the resignation of Nelson Vivas. He returned to his previous role after the appointment of Juan Pablo Vojvoda.

In June 2018, Fernández started the pre-season in charge of Defensa after Vojvoda left, but left the club himself shortly after as Sebastián Beccacece was appointed as manager. On 4 September of that year, he was named manager of Peruvian Liga 2 side Sport Boys.

Fernández resigned from Sport Boys on 1 November 2018, but was again named manager of the club the following 11 March. On 3 July 2019, he resigned again, and returned to his home country to take over Agropecuario on 15 October.

On 12 November 2021, Fernández announced his resignation from Agropecuario, and was appointed Ferro Carril Oeste manager on 28 December. He was sacked on 29 March 2022, and was named at the helm of Alvarado on 4 April.

Fernández was dismissed by Alvarado on 18 July 2022, as the club was nearing the relegation zone. On 14 November, he returned to Chile to take over Audax Italiano.

Fernández was sacked by Audax on 17 April 2023, after just one win in 10 league matches. He subsequently returned to his home country to take over Ciudad de Bolívar on 23 June.

Fernández left Ciudad on 14 October 2023, despite being in the first position of their group. On 5 January 2024, he agreed to return to Chile after being named at the helm of Unión La Calera, but left by mutual consent on 27 May.
