= Luca Marcogiuseppe =

Argentine football manager

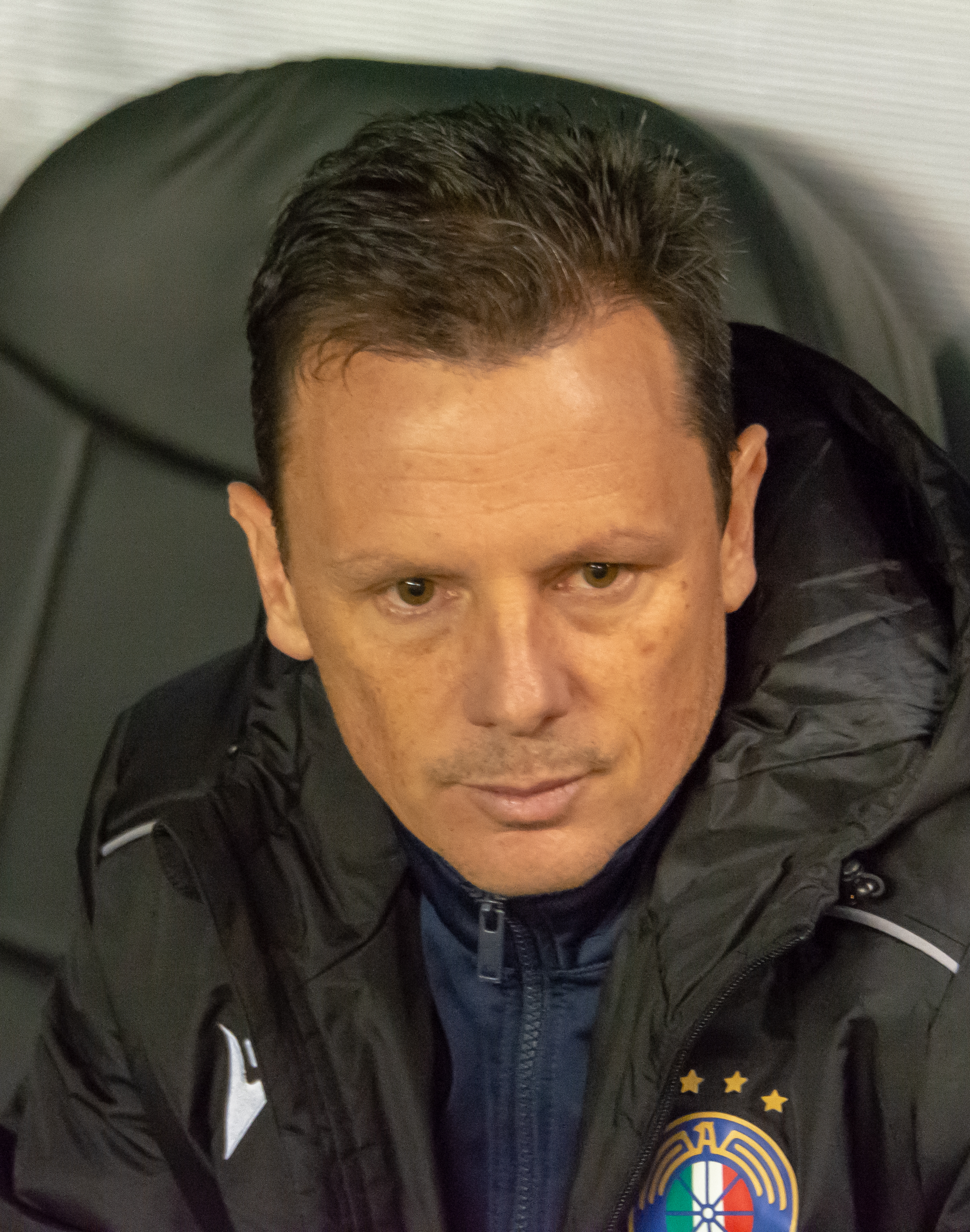
- Marcogiuseppe with Audax Italiano in 2023

Personal information
- Full name: Luca Miguel Marcogiuseppe
- Date of birth: 21 February 1980 (age 46)
- Place of birth: Concordia, Argentina

Team information
- Current team: Huracán (assistant)

Managerial career
- Years: Team
- 2003: La Bianca (youth)
- 2004–2011: Salto Grande (youth)
- 2012: Vélez Sarsfield (youth)
- 2012–2015: Gimnasia LP (youth)
- 2016–2017: Racing Club (youth)
- 2017–2020: Unión de Santa Fe (assistant)
- 2020–2021: Real Pilar
- 2021: Unión La Calera
- 2022: Gimnasia Mendoza
- 2023: Audax Italiano
- 2024–2025: Huracán (assistant)
- 2026: Talleres (assistant)

Luca Miguel Marcogiuseppe (born 21 February 1980) is an Argentine football manager. His last club was Chilean side Audax Italiano.

== Career ==
Born in Concordia, Entre Ríos, Marcogiuseppe started his career at local side La Bianca in 2003. He subsequently worked at Salto Grande's youth categories before knowing Marcelo Bielsa in a conference in 2010; after showing Bielsa his work method, Marcogiuseppe was hired by him to work as a video analyst at Athletic Bilbao.

After leaving Athletic in 2012, Marcogiuseppe worked in the youth categories of Vélez Sarsfield, Gimnasia La Plata and Racing Club. In July 2017, he was named Leonardo Madelón's assistant at Unión de Santa Fe.

On 27 October 2020, Marcogiuseppe started his managerial career after being appointed in charge of Primera C Metropolitana side Real Pilar. The following 28 February, he replaced compatriot Juan Pablo Vojvoda at the helm of Chilean Primera División club Unión La Calera.

Marcogiuseppe left La Calera on a mutual consent on 1 July 2021, and returned to his home country the following 24 February, replacing Diego Pozo at Gimnasia y Esgrima de Mendoza. He reached the semifinals of the play-offs in the 2022 Primera Nacional, but announced his departure from the club on 7 November.

On 22 November 2022, Marcogiuseppe was named manager of Primera División side Arsenal de Sarandí, along with Carlos Ruiz, but resigned on 30 December. The following 26 April, he returned to Chile after being appointed in charge of Audax Italiano. On 4 September, he left the club due to bad results.

== Personal life ==
Marcogiuseppe's younger brother Kevin is also a football manager.
