= Javier Saldías =

Chilean footballer

Personal information
- Full name: Javier Ignacio Saldías Cea
- Date of birth: 21 August 2001 (age 25)
- Place of birth: Penco, Chile
- Height: 1.74 m (5 ft 9 in)
- Position: Full-back

Youth career
- Universidad de Concepción

Senior career*
Years	Team	Apps	(Gls)
2017–2024	Universidad de Concepción	99	(2)
2020–2021	→ Barnechea (loan)	14	(1)
2025–2026	Unión La Calera	29	(1)
- * Club domestic league appearances and goals as of 25 August 2026

Javier Ignacio Saldías Cea (born 21 August 2001) is a Chilean footballer who plays as a full-back. He last played for Chilean Primera División club Unión La Calera.

== Club career ==
Born in Penco, Chile, Saldías is a product of Universidad de Concepción. He was promoted to the first team at the age of 15 and made his professional debut in 2020. In October 2020, he was loaned out to Barnechea. Back to Universidad de Concepción the next season, he ended his contract with them at the end of the 2024 season after playing over a hundred official matches.

On 17 December 2024, Saldías signed with Unión La Calera in the Chilean Primera División.

In March 2026, Saldías suffered a pulmonary embolism that kept him out from football activity for the rest of the season. He left Unión La Calera in August of the same year.

== Personal life ==
In 2022, Saldías started an undertaking in clothes sale alongside his partner.

== Style of play ==
A versatile player, Saldías mainly operates as a right-back, but he can also operate as a left-back or a centre-back. He also has played as a midfielder.
