= 1984 Campeonato Nacional Segunda División =

Segunda División
- Season: 1984
- Champions: Unión La Calera
- Promoted: Unión La Calera; Deportes Concepción
- Relegated: Deportes Laja; General Velásquez; Iván Mayo
- Top goalscorer: Luis Martínez (28 goals); Curicó Unido

The 1984 Segunda División de Chile was the 33rd season of the Segunda División de Chile.

Unión La Calera was the tournament's champion.

== Final table ==
=== North Zone ===
| Pos | Team | Pld | W | D | L | GF | GA | GD | Pts | Qualification or relegation |
|---|---|---|---|---|---|---|---|---|---|---|
| 1 | Unión Santa Cruz | 16 | 9 | 2 | 5 | 20 | 16 | +4 | 20 | Qualified to Promotion Playoffs |
| 2 | Unión La Calera | 16 | 7 | 5 | 4 | 24 | 18 | +6 | 19 | Qualified to Promotion Playoffs |
| 3 | Curicó Unido | 16 | 7 | 4 | 5 | 29 | 22 | +7 | 18 | Qualified to Promotion Playoffs |
| 4 | Super Lo Miranda | 16 | 7 | 3 | 6 | 23 | 19 | +4 | 17 | Qualified to Promotion Playoffs |
| 5 | Deportes Ovalle | 16 | 5 | 6 | 5 | 18 | 18 | 0 | 16 | |
| 6 | Quintero Unido | 16 | 4 | 8 | 4 | 15 | 17 | −2 | 16 | |
| 7 | Deportes Linares | 16 | 4 | 6 | 6 | 14 | 15 | −1 | 14 | |
| 8 | Iván Mayo | 16 | 4 | 6 | 6 | 21 | 24 | −3 | 14 | Relegated to 1985 Tercera División de Chile |
| 9 | General Velásquez | 16 | 3 | 4 | 9 | 13 | 28 | −15 | 10 | Relegated to 1985 Tercera División de Chile |

Source: rsssf.com

=== South Zone ===
| Pos | Team | Pld | W | D | L | GF | GA | GD | Pts | Promotion or relegation |
|---|---|---|---|---|---|---|---|---|---|---|
| 1 | Deportes Concepción | 16 | 9 | 4 | 3 | 20 | 8 | +12 | 22 | Promoted to 1985 Primera División de Chile |
| 2 | Deportes Puerto Montt | 16 | 7 | 3 | 6 | 13 | 14 | −1 | 17 | |
| 3 | Malleco Unido | 16 | 7 | 2 | 7 | 20 | 18 | +2 | 16 | |
| 4 | Lota Schwager | 16 | 6 | 4 | 6 | 18 | 17 | +1 | 16 | |
| 5 | Iberia | 16 | 6 | 4 | 6 | 16 | 15 | +1 | 16 | |
| 6 | Deportes Valdivia | 16 | 5 | 5 | 6 | 18 | 21 | −3 | 15 | |
| 7 | Deportes Victoria | 16 | 4 | 6 | 6 | 26 | 27 | −1 | 14 | |
| 8 | Provincial Osorno | 16 | 5 | 4 | 7 | 13 | 18 | −5 | 14 | |
| 9 | Deportes Laja | 16 | 5 | 4 | 7 | 14 | 20 | −6 | 14 | Desciende a 1985 Tercera División de Chile |

Source: rsssf.com

== Promotion playoffs ==
| Pos | Team | Pld | W | D | L | GF | GA | GD | Pts | Promotion |
|---|---|---|---|---|---|---|---|---|---|---|
| 1 | Unión La Calera (C) | 3 | 3 | 0 | 0 | 6 | 2 | +4 | 6 | Champion and promoted to 1985 Primera División de Chile |
| 2 | Curicó Unido | 3 | 1 | 0 | 2 | 6 | 6 | 0 | 2 | |
| 3 | Super Lo Miranda | 3 | 1 | 0 | 2 | 3 | 3 | 0 | 2 | |
| 4 | Unión Santa Cruz | 3 | 1 | 0 | 2 | 3 | 7 | −4 | 2 | |

Source: rsssf.com
(C) Champions

== See also ==
- Chilean football league system
