= Unión La Calera =

Association football club

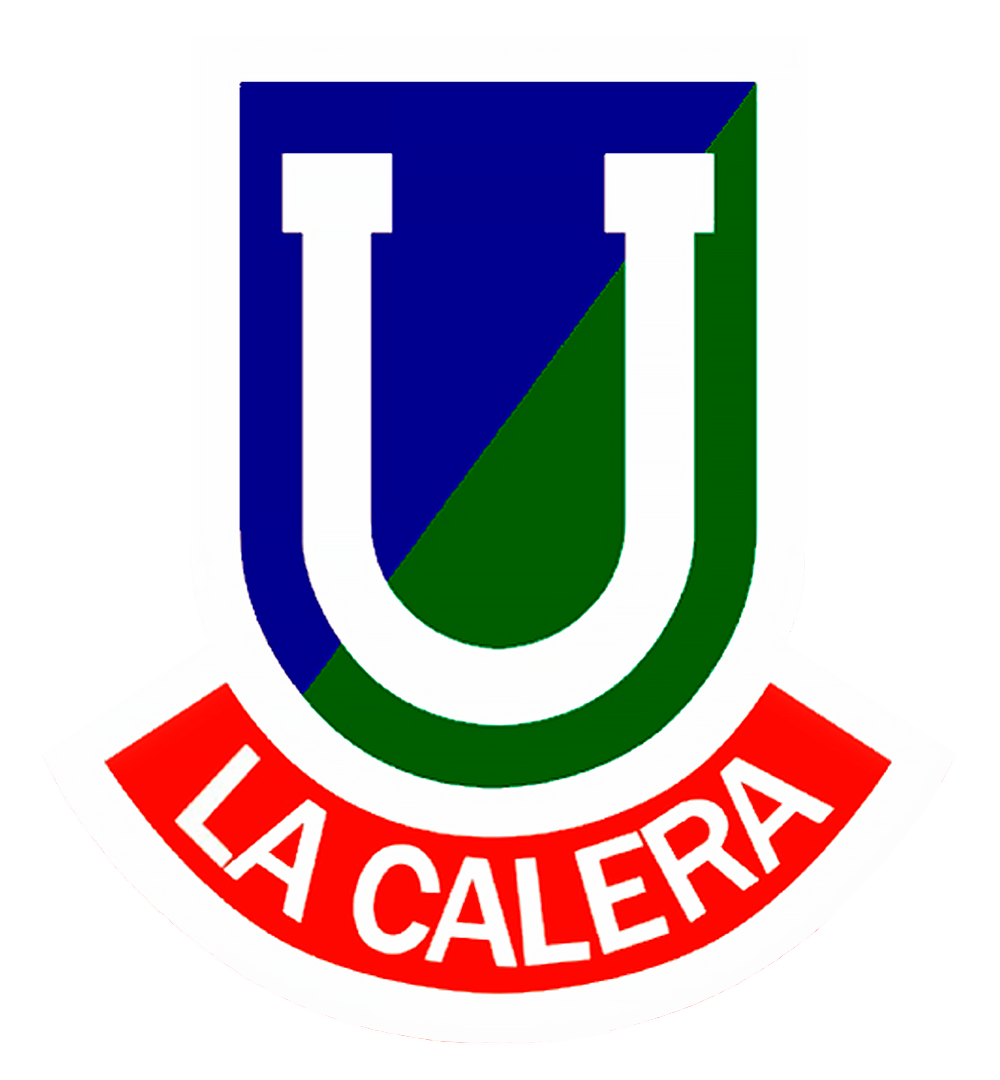
- Full name: Club Deportivo Unión La Calera
- Nicknames: Cementeros (Cement Men); Rojos (Reds)
- Founded: 26 January 1954; 72 years ago
- Ground: Nicolás Chahuán Nazar Municipal Stadium, La Calera, Chile
- Capacity: 9,200
- Chairman: Gustavo Cerioni
- Manager: Martín Cicotello
- League: Liga de Primera
- 2025: Liga de Primera, 12th of 16
- Website: ulc.cl
Home colours	Away colours

Unión La Calera is a Chilean football club based in La Calera, Chile. The club competes in the Primera División de Chile.

It was founded as Club de Deportes La Calera on 26 January 1954, after the merger of three teams from the city: Condor, Calera Comercio and Tifón. The following year, Deportes La Calera joined Club de Deportes Melón (originated by the merger between Cemento Melón and Minas Navío) to form Unión La Calera.

After spending 6 seasons in the second division, the club obtained its first promotion to Primera División de Chile in 1961, where they remained until 1974. In 1985, they returned to top-tier, but they were relegated the incoming season. From there, they wandered through second division and third division, until returning to the top category in 2011, and in 2018, after a brief stint in the promotion division (Primera B). Unión La Calera has won three second division titles (the 1961 and 1984 Segunda División de Chile titles; and a 2017 Primera B title) and two Tercera División de Chile honors (1990 and 2000).

The color that identifies the club is red (present in their uniform since the formation as Union La Calera) and disputes their home games at the Nicolás Chahuán Nazar Municipal Stadium. Nevertheless, due to its reconstruction, around 2017 and 2018 they moved to Estadio Municipal Lucio Fariña Fernández in neighboring Quillota (which has a capacity for 7703 spectators). Their main local rivals are San Luis de Quillota.

The club is well known for be the team when Sergio Jadue began his sports manager career before coming to power in the ANFP in 2011. He assumed Unión La Calera Corporation's presidency in 2007. In June 2009 he was appointed Club's President of the Board. During his management, Unión La Calera was promoted, after 26 years, to top-tier in 2010. After his departure, the team had a brief success in 2011's first part, reaching the Torneo Apertura's semi-final. In that tournament, highlighted players like Ramón Ignacio Fernández, Braian Rodríguez or Gonzalo Barriga.

== History ==
=== 1954–1970: Beginnings ===
The club was founded on 15 April 1955. It was following the merger between five local clubs: Tifón, Minas Navío, Cóndor, Cemento Melón and Calera Comercio. Nevertheless, the club's foundation was recorded on 26 January 1954.

=== 2011–2016: Primera División de Chile ===
==== The successful 2011 season ====
===== 2011 Torneo Apertura =====
Unión La Calera began the 2011 season hiring eight players: Jonathan Domínguez (forward from Unión San Felipe), Rodrigo Flores (goalkeeper from O'Higgins), Ángel Carreño (midfielder from Deportes La Serena), Jorge Ampuero (defender from Unión Española), Ramón Ignacio Fernández (from Argentinian powerhouse Estudiantes de La Plata), Braian Rodríguez (from Peru's top-tier Club Deportivo Universidad de San Martín de Porres), Claudio Muñoz (from Universidad de Concepción) and Luis Jiménez Barrera (from Deportes Melipilla).

====== Regular Phase ======
They debuted in the 2011 Torneo Apertura on 30 January with a 1–1 draw with Santiago Morning. In this match the scores were from Paraguayan striker Ever Cantero for Santiago Morning and an own-goal from Edgardo Abdala. The next week on 6 February, the Uruguayan Braian Rodríguez (the striker from San Martín de Porres) scored Calera's first goal in top-tier in a 1–0 home win over Unión San Felipe. Besides, it was the club's first goal scored by a team's player after its 24 year-absence in Primera from 1987 season (considering Abdala's own goal). On 12 February, for the third week, they surprised everyone after beating 2–1 to Universidad Católica as local in Nicolás Chahuán Nazar Municipal Stadium. The goals for Calera were scored by the defender Claudio Muñoz in the 39th minute (who precisely played in Universidad Católica between 2004 and 2007, prior to play in Universidad de Concepción) and Diego Cuéllar in the 75th minute, who netted the tie-breaker goal after Hans Martínez's equalizing goal in 66th minute. Thereby, Unión La Calera broke the small unbeaten Universidad Católica had in the first two games (a 0–2 away win over Deportes Iquique and a 3–1 victory against Audax Italiano). Nevertheless, on 19 February, now Calera's short unbeaten was broken by Cobresal which defeat 3–1 the team in El Salvador with a hat-trick of Joel Soto. The goal for Calera was of Alejandro Risso. The following week the team was recovered from the 3–1 defeat with Cobresal, beating 2–0 to Deportes La Serena at Nicolás Chahuán Nazar, but after this victory, an important triumph was against Cobreloa in Calama with a goal of Ramón Fernández in the 17th minute. This victory meant the team's climb to the league table's first place, being there with thirteen points next to Universidad Católica. The next matchday, Católica and Calera remained as table's leaders after both teams won to Universidad de Concepción (Calera; 2–0) and Palestino (Católica; 1–2).

On 11 March, Unión La Calera had to play with giants Colo-Colo at the Estadio Monumental in the capital city of Santiago. However, the team was defeated in a 2–0 loss with goals of the Argentinian Lucas Wilchez and Chilean international José Pedro Fuenzalida. The next matchday, on 20 March, Unión La Calera defeated 3–1 as local to Audax Italiano, thereby confirming its second place behind Universidad Católica. The team began losing with a goal of Bryan Carrasco in the 20th minute, but the score of Braian Rodríguez through a penalty, gave encouragement so that later Octavio Pozo and Jorge Ampuero contribute with goals.

Since the 10th week after a 3–1 loss to Unión Española, the team went into a losing streak until the end of the regular phase which finished in the seventeenth week. Since there, Unión La Calera draw then with Palestino (with a goal of Braian Rodríguez in 90th minute), lost with Universidad de Chile by a 2–0 score, again 2–0 with O'Higgins the next week (13th) and in the 15th matchday (after a 0–0 draw Huachipato in the 14th week) lost 1–0 to Deportes Iquique with a score of defender Juan González Calderón. Only a 2–0 win over Ñublense with a twice of Braian Rodríguez in the 16th matchday, and a 1–1 away draw with Santiago Wanderers in regular phase's final matchday, secured the team's classification to the playoffs (the qualified were eight teams out of a total of eighteen). The team finished in the sixth position with 25 points over Unión San Felipe with 24 points (7th) and Colo-Colo with 23 points (8th).

====== League table ======
Pos	Team	Pld	W	D	L	GF	GA	GD	Pts	Qualification
4	Palestino	17	9	3	5	26	20	+6	30	Playoffs
5	O'Higgins	17	8	3	6	29	26	+3	27	Playoffs
6	Unión La Calera	17	7	4	6	18	18	0	25	Playoffs
7	Unión San Felipe	17	7	3	7	24	21	+3	24	Playoffs
8	Colo-Colo	17	7	3	7	28	26	+2	24 (Note: Colo-Colo lost three points for not present hiring files of midfielder Joan Muñoz during the game against Cobresal, so that Colo-Colo lost for walkover.)	Playoffs

Source: Asociación Nacional de Fútbol Profesional
Rules for classification: 1. Points; 2. Wins; 3. Goal difference; 4. Goals scored; 5. Away goals; 6. Red cards; 7. Yellow cards; 8. Draw.

===== Playoffs =====
====== Background and Results ======
The favorite to win the championship was Universidad Católica which finished in the regular phase's first place. Nevertheless, Católica (after winning to Unión La Calera in the semi-finals) lost to Universidad de Chile in the final's second leg, where Universidad de Chile won 4–1, reversing the first leg's 0–2. For its part, Unión La Calera already without the surprise sensation which generated in the tournament's early part, defeated to Unión Española in the quarterfinals for then repeat a 2–1 triumph over Católica in the semifinals first leg. Unfortunately, in the next leg, the team was eliminated after losing 1–0 in Santiago.

Quarterfinals
1	Universidad Católica	4	1	5
8	Colo-Colo	2	1	3
3	Unión Española	0	0	0
6	Unión La Calera	1	0	1
2	Universidad de Chile	2	1	3
7	Unión San Felipe	1	1	2
4	Palestino	1	0	1
5	O'Higgins	1	3	4

Semifinals
1	Universidad Católica	1	1	2
6	Unión La Calera	2	0	2
2	Universidad de Chile	1	7	8
5	O'Higgins	0	1	1

Finals
1	Universidad Católica	2	1	3
2	Universidad de Chile	0	4	4

====== Quarterfinals: Calera vs. Unión Española ======
First leg

On 26 May, Unión La Calera and Unión Española played the quarterfinal's first leg at Nicolás Chahuán Nazar Municipal Stadium and the team recovered from its 3–1 loss in the regular phase. The game's only one goal was scored by Ángel Carreño in the 68th minute. The match had 2,459 spectators.

Astorga this time played with a 3–4–1–2 lineup: Lucas Giovini in the goal; in the rear, Jorge Ampuero as left sweeper, Mario Berríos as centre-back, Nicolás Suárez as right sweeper; in the midfield, Ángel Carreño and Claudio Muñoz as central midfielders, Francisco Bahamondes and Gonzalo Barriga as left midfielder and right midfielders respectively and finally with Ramón Fernández as playmaker; meantime the forward was composite by Braian Rodríguez and Jonathan Domínguez. On the other hand, José Luis Sierra played with a 4–2–1–3 lineup: Eduardo Lobos in the goal; in the rear, Rafael Olarra and Leandro Delgado as centre backs, Fernando Cordero as left back and Esteban González as right back; in the midfield, Braulio Leal and Gonzalo Villagra (captain) as central midfielders and Martín Ligüera as playmaker; the forwards were Raúl Estévez, Sebastián Jaime and Mario Aravena.

26 May 2011 First leg	Unión La Calera	1–0	Unión Española	La Calera
16:00 (CLT)	Carreño 68'	Report		Stadium: Nicolás Chahuán; Attendance: 2,459; Referee: Enrique Osses

Second leg

On 29 May, the teams played the quarterfinal's second leg at Estadio Santa Laura. The game ended in a 0–0 draw which allowed to Unión La Calera the qualification to the semifinal. The match had 4,842 spectators.

For its part, Unión with Sierra also repeated the 4–2–1–3 lineup, being the only one change Leonardo Monje (who scored against Calera in the team's 3–1 defeat as visitors in Santa Laura for the regular phase) instead of Mario Aravena. Between the key events, Leal missed a penalty in the 24th minute and Jaime was sent-off in the 71st minute.

29 May 2011 Second leg	Unión Española	0–0 (0–1 agg.)	Unión La Calera	Independencia, Santiago
18:00 (CLT)	Jaime (red card) 71'	Report		Stadium: Santa Laura; Attendance: 4,842; Referee: Claudio Puga

====== Semifinals: Católica vs. Calera ======
First Leg

Unión La Calera played the semifinal's first leg with Universidad Católica on 2 June. Astorga played with the same lineup that occupied against Unión Española in the quarterfinal's second leg, whilst Católica, coached by Juan Antonio Pizzi, played with a 4–2–2–2 lineup: Christopher Toselli in the goal; David Henríquez and Alfonso Parot as central backs; Rodrigo Valenzuela and Juan Eluchans as full backs; Gonzalo Sepúlveda and Tomás Costa as central midfielders; Fernando Meneses and Milovan Mirosevic as right and left midfielders; and finally Pablo Calandria and Francisco Pizarro as forwards.

Bahamondes opened the score in the 26th minute and a minute later Gonzalo Barriga scored the partial 2–0. Eight minutes later, Milovan Mirosevic scored through a header the discount, beating thereby to Giovini. The rest of the game was dominated by Unión La Calera, and Universidad Católica suffered the sent-off of Mirosevic (double yellow card; 64th minute) and Rodrigo Valenzuela (direct red card; 72nd minute).

Finished the game, with this victory Unión La Calera had the first opportunity to qualify to the final. They just had to draw in Estadio San Carlos de Apoquindo or win by one goal there, in Chile's capital city Santiago.

2 June 2011 First leg	Unión La Calera	2–1	Universidad Católica	La Calera
16:00 (CLT)	Bahamondes 25'; Barriga 27'	Report	Mirošević 35' (red card) 63'; Valenzuela (red card) 82'	Stadium: Nicolás Chahuán; Attendance: 3,500; Referee: Eduardo Gamboa

Second Leg

For this match, Pizzi changed Católica's lineup to face Calera, this time he remained Toselli in the goal, but played with a 3–2–3–2 lineup (similar to Astorga's 3–4–1–2 lineup): the defenders were Enzo Roco (then Enzo Andía) as left sweeper, Hans Martínez as centre back and Alfonso Parot as right sweeper; as central midfielders were Jorge Ormeño and Francisco Silva; the attacking midfielders were Fernando Meneses (left midfielder), Marcelo Cañete (playmaker) and Felipe Gutiérrez; whilst the forwards were Roberto Gutiérrez and Lucas Pratto. Astorga for its part, remained the same lineup, again with the same players.

The game's only one goal was scored by Enzo Andía in the beginnings of the second half (46th minute). This goal, frustrated Calera's chances to qualify to the final. In that way, thereby was how Calera concluded its first great campaign in Chilean top-level.

5 June 2011 Second leg	Universidad Católica	1–0 (2–2 agg.)	Unión La Calera	Las Condes, Santiago
17:00 (CLT)	Andía 46'; Silva (red card) 90+1'	Report		Stadium: San Carlos de Apoquindo; Attendance: 13,200; Referee: Claudio Puga
Note: Universidad Católica won due to its position at the regular season (U. Católica: 1st, La Calera: 6th)

== Emblem ==
The traditional shield of Unión La Calera consists of one with the colors blue and green divided diagonally, with a "U" in white and borders of the same color. Below, on a red background "La Calera" is presented. In mid-2018 this shield was registered for commercial purposes by Sabino Jadue, former head of the institution, so since 2019 the club occupies a white circular shield with a thick red border where it says “Unión La Calera”, and within the white area the abbreviation «ULC» appears in greenish bluish tones.

This change was resisted by the fans, who held demonstrations in La Calera, and started a campaign on social networks to restore the historic shield. In 2021 the traditional shield returned to the shirts, this time in conjunction with the new insignia. In January 2026, the club returned to its original emblem.

== Uniform ==
Traditionally Unión La Calera's home kit is composed by a red shirt, white pants and white socks. Its away kit meanwhile is entirely white. During the 2007 Primera B season, Calera's home kit was symbolized by a white and red horizontal striped shirt; its pants and socks were white. This kit is similar to the one used by the team when it got its promotion to Primera División in 1984.

For the 2010 second-tier season, the titular uniform is a red shirt with vertical white bars, red pants and red socks.

Once promoted to 2018 Primera División de Chile, during that tournament, the team changed its kit colors to entirely red like the kit which occupied during the 2014–15 season.

=== Sponsorship ===
Period	Kit manufacturer	Shirt sponsor
1955–1983	None	None
1983–1984	Costa	None
1985–1992	None	None (1985)
1985–1992	None	Dolphin (1986)
1985–1992	None	None (1986–1992)
1994–1996	Torpedo Sport	None (1994)
1994–1996	Torpedo Sport	Maquinaria Ribas (1995)
1994–1996	Torpedo Sport	None (1996)
1997	Diadora	
1998–2001	Torpedo Sport	None (1998)
1998–2001	Torpedo Sport	Santa Isabel (1999–2001)
2001–2003	Adidas	None
2004–2016	Training	Cemento Melón (2004–2008)
2004–2016	Training	Censocal (2009)
2004–2016	Training	PF (2010–2016)
2017–	KS7	Refugio de Cristo (2017–2018)
2017–	KS7	PF (2018–)

== Players ==
=== Current squad ===
Current squad of Unión La Calera as of 13 August 2026 (edit)
Sources: ANFP Official Web Site

No.		Position	Player
1	ARG	GK	Nicolás Avellaneda
2	CHI	DF	Yonathan Andía
3	CHI	DF	Nicolás Palma
4	CAN	DF	Cristián Gutiérrez
5	CHI	MF	Camilo Moya
6	CHI	DF	Vicente Lavín (loan from Deportes Temuco)
7	CHI	MF	Bayron Oyarzo
8	CHI	MF	Yerko Leiva
9	ARG	FW	Francisco Pozzo (loan from Vélez Sarsfield)
10	URU	MF	Kevin Méndez
11	ARG	FW	Sebastián Sáez (c)
12	CHI	GK	Nelson Espinoza
13	CHI	MF	Pablo Valero
14	CHI	MF	Carlo Villanueva
15	ARG	DF	Juan Pablo Salomoni
16	CHI	MF	Gustavo Saavedra

No.		Position	Player
17	CHI	FW	Martín Hiriart (loan from Universidad Católica)
18	ARG	MF	Axel Encinas
19	CHI	FW	Matías Campos López
20	CHI	MF	Joan Cruz (loan from Oviedo B)
21	ARG	DF	Valentino Torrente
23	URU	MF	Rodrigo Pérez
25	CHI	DF	Christopher Díaz
26	CHI	DF	Michael Maturana
27	CHI	DF	Daniel Gutiérrez (loan from Colo-Colo)
28	CHI	MF	Cristóbal Lindermann
29	CHI	MF	Joaquín Soto
30	CHI	FW	Maximiliano Fernández
32	ARG	FW	Nicolás Ferreyra (loan from Gimnasia de Mendoza)
–	ARG	DF	Rodrigo Cáseres
–	ARG	MF	Benjamín Argandoña

Manager: John Armijo

=== 2026 Winter Transfers ===
==== In ====
Note: Flags indicate national team as defined under FIFA eligibility rules; some limited exceptions apply. Players may hold more than one non-FIFA nationality.

No.	Pos.	Nation	Player
6	DF	CHI	Vicente Lavín (loan from Deportes Temuco)
15	DF	ARG	Juan Pablo Salomoni (from Beroe)
21	DF	ARG	Valentino Torrente (from Newell's Old Boys)

No.	Pos.	Nation	Player
23	MF	URU	Rodrigo Pérez (from Olimpia)
32	FW	ARG	Nicolás Ferreyra (loan from Gimnasia de Mendoza)

==== Out ====
Note: Flags indicate national team as defined under FIFA eligibility rules; some limited exceptions apply. Players may hold more than one non-FIFA nationality.

No.	Pos.	Nation	Player
13	DF	CHI	Alexander Pastene (released)
24	MF	ARG	Juan Manuel Requena (to Universitario)

No.	Pos.	Nation	Player
—	DF	CHI	Javier Saldías (released)
—	FW	CHI	Tomás Casanova (to Sporting Polistena)

== Managers ==
- (Italy) Mario Pretto (1954)
- (Chile) Guillermo Saavedra (1954)
- (Chile) Óscar Andrade (1954)
- (Chile) Luis Vidal (1954)
- (Chile) Sergio Cruzat (1955–1956)
- (Chile) Raúl Román (1956)
- (Argentina) José Manuel Ufano (1957)
- (Chile) Julio Varela (1957)
- (Argentina) Salvador Biondi (1958)
- (Argentina) Donato Hernández (1959–1960)
- (Chile) Óscar Andrade (1960–1962)
- (Hungary) Ladislao Pakozdi (1962)
- (Chile) Raúl Marchant (1963)
- (Argentina) Salvador Biondi (1964)
- (Argentina) Julio Baldovinos (1965)
- (Argentina) José María Lourido (1965–1966)
- (Chile) Isaac Carrasco (1966)
- (Chile) Carlos Marchant (1966)
- (Chile) Raúl Pino (1966)
- (Argentina) Salvador Biondi (1967)
- (Chile) Francisco Torres (1967–1968)
- (Hungary) Ladislao Pakozdi (1968)
- (Chile) Armando Aravena (1968)
- (Chile) Sergio Cruzat (1969–1970)
- (Argentina) Donato Hernández (1970)
- (Chile) René García (1970)
- (Chile) Rómulo Betta (1970)
- (Argentina) José María Lourido (1970–1971)
- (Chile) Óscar Andrade (1972)
- (Chile) René García (1972)
- (Chile) Jorge Venegas (1973)
- (Chile) Sasha Mitjaew (1973–1974)
- (Chile) Ramón Estay (1974)
- (Argentina) José María Lourido (1974)
- (Chile) Ramón Estay (1975)
- (Chile) Rodrigo Salazar (1975)
- (Argentina) Salvador Biondi (1975)
- (Argentina) José María Lourido (1976)
- (Chile) Viterbo Valdivia (1976)
- (Chile) Julio Varela (1976)
- (Argentina) Donato Hernández (1976–1977)
- (Chile) Rubén Mondaca (1977)
- (Chile) Sergio Cruzat (1977)
- (Chile) Jorge Toro (1978)
- (Chile) Jaime Ramírez (1979)
- (Chile) Viterbo Valdivia (1979)
- (Chile) Óscar Andrade (1979)
- (Chile) Antonio Vargas (1980)
- (Chile) Carlos Contreras (1980–1981)
- (Chile) Óscar Andrade (1981)
- (Chile) Viterbo Valdivia (1981)
- (Chile) Alfonso Sepúlveda (1981–1982)
- (Chile) Luis Anabalón (1983)
- (Chile) Rolando Torino (1983)
- (Chile) Fidel Zuleta (1983)
- (Chile) Alfonso Sepúlveda (1983–1984)
- (Chile) Jorge Toro (1984)
- (Chile) Fidel Zuleta (1984)
- (Chile) Alfonso Sepúlveda (1985–1986)
- (Chile) Rolando García (1986)
- (Chile) Álex Veloso (1986)
- (Chile) Viterbo Valdivia (1986)
- (Chile) Luis Anabalón (1986)
- (Chile) Viterbo Valdivia + Fidel Zuleta (1987)
- (Chile) Ricardo Horta (1987)
- (Chile) Viterbo Valdivia (1987)
- (Chile) Wilson Castillo (1987)
- (Chile) Alfonso Sepúlveda (1987)
- (Chile) Antonio Vargas (1988)
- (Chile) Fidel Zuleta (1989)
- (Chile) Ramón Estay (1989)
- (Chile) Viterbo Valdivia (1990)
- (Chile) Manuel Gaete (1990–1992)
- (Chile) Manfredo González (1993)
- (Chile) Luis Ramírez (1993)
- (Chile) Alfonso Sepúlveda (1993–1994)
- (Chile) Manuel Gaete (1994–1995)
- (Chile) Antonio Vargas (1995)
- (Chile) José González (1995)
- (Chile) Alfredo Núñez (1996–1997)
- (Chile) Alfonso Sepúlveda (1997–1998)
- (Chile) Alfredo Núñez (1998)
- (Chile) Hernán Castro (1999)
- (Chile) Rodolfo Dubó (2000)
- (Chile) Horacio Rivas (2001)
- (Chile) Manuel Gaete (2002)
- (Chile) Hernán Ibarra (2002)
- (Chile) Luis Marcoleta (2003)
- (Uruguay) Jorge Luis Siviero (2004)
- (Chile) Alfredo Núñez (2004–2005)
- (Palestine) (Chile) Nicola Hadwa (2005)
- (Chile) Alexis Ortega (2005)
- (Chile) Alfredo Núñez (2006)
- (Chile) Hernán Ibarra (2006–2007)
- (Argentina) Claudio Nigretti (2007)
- (Chile) Alexis Ortega (2007)
- (Chile) Jorge Socías (2008)
- (Chile) Alexis Ortega (2008)
- (Chile) Jorge Contreras (2008–2009)
- (Chile) Alexis Ortega (2009)
- (Chile) Miguel Alegre (2009)
- (Argentina) Víctor Milanese Comisso (2009)
- (Chile) Emiliano Astorga (2010–2012)
- (Chile) Raúl Toro (2012)
- (Argentina) Néstor Craviotto (2013–2014)
- (Argentina) Ariel Pereyra (2014–2015)
- (Chile) Miguel Riffo (2015–2016)
- (Uruguay) Leonardo Ramos (2016)
- (Argentina) Mario Pobersnik (2016)
- (Argentina) Humberto Grondona (2016)
- (Argentina) Christian Lovrincevich (2017)
- (Chile) Víctor Rivero (2017–2018)
- (Argentina) Francisco Meneghini (2018–2019)
- (Argentina) Walter Coyette (2019)
- (Argentina) Juan Pablo Vojvoda (2020–2021)
- (Argentina) Luca Marcogiuseppe (2021)
- (Argentina) Francisco Meneghini (2021)
- (Argentina) Martín Anselmi (2022)
- (Chile) Carlos Galdames (2022)
- (Argentina) Federico Vilar (2022)
- (Argentina) Gerardo Ameli (2023)
- (Chile) Carlos Galdames (2023)
- (Argentina) Martín Cicotello (2023)
- (Argentina) Manuel Fernández (2024)
- (Chile) Carlos Galdames (2024)
- (Argentina) Walter Lemma (2024–2025)
- (Argentina) Martín Cicotello (2025–Present)

== South American cups history ==
Season	Competition	Round	Opponent	Home	Away	Aggregate
2019	Copa Sudamericana	First Stage	(Brazil) Chapecoense	0–0	1–1	1–1 (a)
2019	Copa Sudamericana	Second Stage	(Brazil) Atlético Mineiro	1–0	0–1	1–1 (0-3p)
2020	Copa Sudamericana	First Stage	(Brazil) Fluminense	0–0	1–1	1–1 (a)
2020	Copa Sudamericana	Second Stage	(Colombia) Deportes Tolima	0–0	1–1	1–1 (a)
2020	Copa Sudamericana	Round of 16	(Colombia) Junior	2–1	1–2	3–3 (2-4p)
2021	Copa Libertadores	Group Stage	(Ecuador) LDU Quito	2–2	2–5	4th Place (2 pts.)
2021	Copa Libertadores	Group Stage	(Brazil) Flamengo	2–2	1–4	4th Place (2 pts.)
2021	Copa Libertadores	Group Stage	(Argentina) Vélez Sarsfield	0–2	1–2	4th Place (2 pts.)
2022	Copa Sudamericana	First Stage	(Chile) Ñublense	0–0	2–1	2–1
2022	Copa Sudamericana	Group Stage	(Brazil) Santos	1–1	0–1	2nd Place (11 pts.)
2022	Copa Sudamericana	Group Stage	(Argentina) Banfield	1–0	1–0	2nd Place (11 pts.)
2022	Copa Sudamericana	Group Stage	(Ecuador) Universidad Católica	3–2	0–0	2nd Place (11 pts.)
2024	Copa Sudamericana	First Stage	(Chile) Everton	1–0 (single-leg)		
2024	Copa Sudamericana	Group Stage	(Brazil) Cruzeiro	0–0	0–1	4th Place (4 pts.)
2024	Copa Sudamericana	Group Stage	(Ecuador) Universidad Católica	0–1	0–4	4th Place (4 pts.)
2024	Copa Sudamericana	Group Stage	(Colombia) Alianza FC	0–1	1–0	4th Place (4 pts.)

== Honours ==
=== National ===
- Primera B de Chile
  - Winners: 1961, 1984, 2017
- Tercera División de Chile
  - Winners (1): 1990, 2000

== See also ==
- La Calera
- Chilean football league system
- Sergio Jadue
