= Carlos Ruiz (Argentine footballer) =

Argentine footballer and manager

Personal information
- Full name: Carlos David Ruiz
- Date of birth: 10 November 1971 (age 54)
- Place of birth: Buenos Aires, Argentina
- Height: 1.78 m (5 ft 10 in)
- Position: Right back

Youth career
- 1992–1993: Racing Club

Senior career*
| Years | Team | Apps | (Gls) |
| 1993–2008 | Arsenal de Sarandí | 399 | (9) |

Managerial career
- 2010–2017: Arsenal de Sarandí (assistant)
- 2010: Arsenal de Sarandí (caretaker)
- 2017–2020: Unión de Santa Fe (assistant)
- 2020–2021: Platense (assistant)
- 2021–2022: Arsenal de Sarandí (assistant)
- 2023: Arsenal de Sarandí
- 2024–: Comunicaciones
- * Club domestic league appearances and goals

Carlos David Ruiz (born 10 November 1971) is an Argentine football manager and former player who played as a right back.

== Playing career ==
Born in Buenos Aires, Ruiz started his professional career with Racing Club de Avellaneda in 1992, but he never played a league game with the club. The following year, 1993, he joined Arsenal de Sarandí, where he played ever since, making him one of the club's longest serving players of all time. One of the highlights of his career was being part of the 2002 Arsenal team that was promoted to the Argentine Primera. During his career, he made 399 appearances for Arsenal, making him the most capped player in the club's history.

== Coaching career ==
On 30 April 2010, Ruiz was named as caretaker coach of Arsenal de Sarandí and replaced Jorge Burruchaga.

== Honours ==
=== Player ===
Arsenal de Sarandí

- Copa Sudamericana: 2007

== See also ==
- List of one-club men
