= Carlos Galdames =

Chilean footballer (born 1980)

Personal information
- Full name: Carlos Patricio Galdames Vásquez
- Date of birth: 1 March 1980 (age 46)
- Place of birth: Osorno, Chile
- Height: 1.73 m (5 ft 8 in)
- Position: Forward

Team information
- Current team: Unión La Calera (interim)

Senior career*
Years	Team	Apps	(Gls)
2005–2007	Provincial Osorno	34	(2)
2006	→ San Luis (loan)	34	(5)
2008	Unión San Felipe	36	(15)
2009–2011	Unión La Calera	27	(4)
2012	Magallanes	6	(0)

Managerial career
- 2020–: Unión La Calera (youth)
- 2022: Unión La Calera (interim)
- 2023: Unión La Calera (interim)
- 2024: Unión La Calera (interim)
- 2026: Unión La Calera (caretaker)
- * Club domestic league appearances and goals

Carlos Patricio Galdames Vásquez (born 1 March 1980) is a Chilean football coach and former player who played as a forward.

== Honours ==
=== Player ===
Provincial Osorno

- Primera B: 2007
