= Lucas Bovaglio =

Argentine footballer (born 1979)

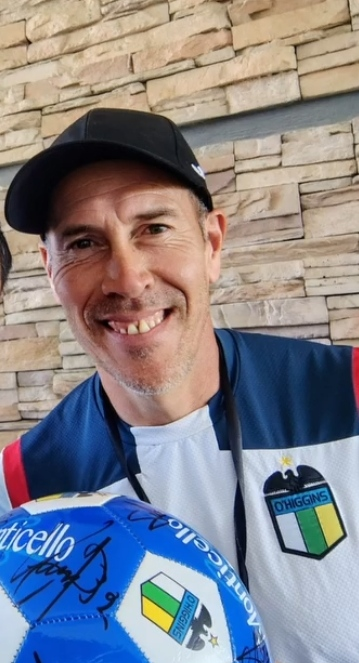
- Bovaglio with O'Higgins in 2026

Personal information
- Full name: Lucas Alfredo Bovaglio
- Date of birth: 19 April 1979 (age 47)
- Place of birth: Rafaela, Argentina
- Height: 1.79 m (5 ft 10 in)
- Position: Centre back

Team information
- Current team: O'Higgins (manager)

Youth career
- Atlético Rafaela

Senior career*
Years	Team	Apps	(Gls)
1998–2000	Atlético Rafaela		
2000–2001	Los Andes	26	(0)
2001–2003	Atlético Rafaela		
2004–2006	Maracaibo	67	(3)
2006	Atlético Rafaela		
2007–2009	Deportivo Táchira	62	(5)
2009–2011	Atlético Rafaela	59	(5)
2011–2012	Estudiantes Tecos	14	(0)
2012–2014	Atlético Rafaela	41	(3)
2014–2015	Talleres	11	(0)

Managerial career
- 2016–2017: Talleres (reserves)
- 2017–2018: Atlético Rafaela
- 2019–2020: Villa Dálmine
- 2021: Deportivo Morón
- 2022–2023: Instituto
- 2024: Guaraní
- 2024–2025: Palestino
- 2026–: O'Higgins
- * Club domestic league appearances and goals

Lucas Alfredo Bovaglio (born 19 April 1979) is an Argentine football manager and former player who played as a central defender. He is the current manager of Chilean club O'Higgins.

== Playing career ==
He played for Argentine clubs Atlético Rafaela (1998–2000, 2001–2003, 2006, 2009–2011, and 2012–2014), Los Andes (2000–2001) and Talleres de Córdoba (2014–2016), in Venezuelan football for Unión Atlético Maracaibo (2004–2006) and Deportivo Táchira (2007–2009), and for Mexican club Estudiantes Tecos (2011–2012).

== Managerial career ==
In June 2024, Bovaglio moved to Chile and signed with Palestino. He renewed with them for the 2025 season He switched to O'Higgins for the 2026 season.
