= Colo Colo–Universidad Católica rivalry =

Footballing rivalry

- Location: Santiago
- Teams: Colo-Colo; Universidad Católica
- First meeting: Colo-Colo 3–2 U. Católica; 1939 Campeonato Nacional (30 May 1939)
- Latest meeting: Colo-Colo 1–4 U. Católica; 2025 Campeonato Nacional (16 August 2025)

Statistics
- Most wins: Colo-Colo (108)
- Most player appearances: Sergio Livingstone (32)
- Top scorer: Francisco Valdés (15)
- Largest victory: U. Católica 1–7 Colo-Colo (29 May 1943)

The Colo Colo–Universidad Católica rivalry also known as Clásico Albo-Cruzado and Clásico Moderno is a footballing rivalry between Chilean clubs Colo-Colo and Universidad Católica. It is considered to be one of the biggest rivalry matches in Chile.

== Statistics ==
Updated 16 August 2025

	Matches	Wins		Draws
	Matches	COLO	UCAT	Draws
Campeonato Nacional	187	82	55	51
Copa Chile	41	16	12	13
Supercopa de Chile	3	2	1	0
Campeonato de Apertura (1933–50)	1	1	0	0
Liguilla Pre-Libertadores	3	0	2	1
Liguilla Pre-Sudamericana	2	1	0	1
Conmebol Libertadores	16	6	5	5
All competitions	251	108	73	70
