= Francisco Meneghini =

Argentine football manager (born 1988)

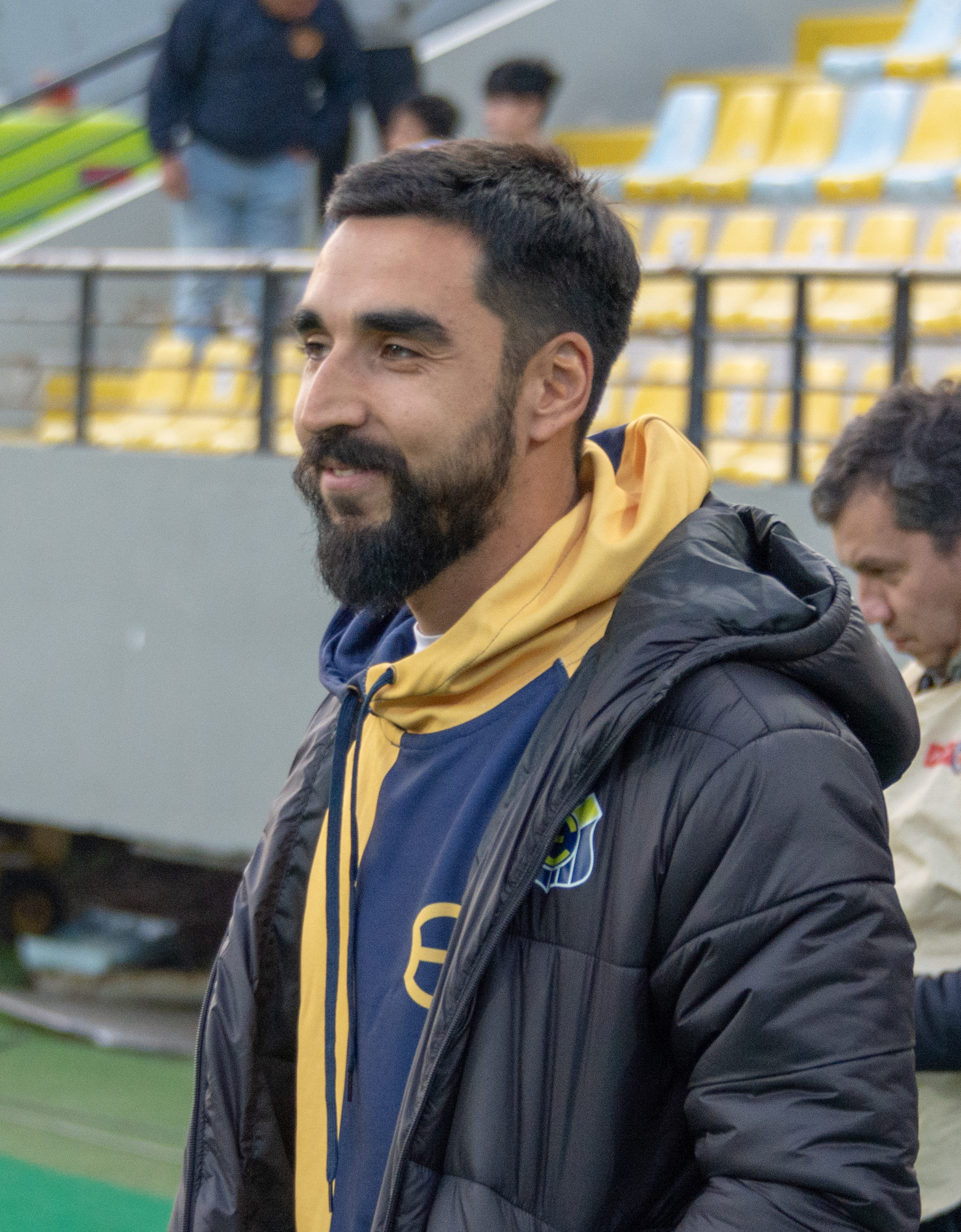
- Meneghini with Everton in 2023.

Personal information
- Full name: Francisco Gustavo Meneghini Correa
- Date of birth: 13 August 1988 (age 38)
- Place of birth: Rosario, Argentina
- Height: 1.77 m (5 ft 10 in)

Managerial career
- Years: Team
- 2016: Universidad de Chile (assistant)
- 2016–2017: Defensa y Justicia (assistant)
- 2018–2019: Unión La Calera
- 2020: Audax Italiano
- 2021: Unión La Calera
- 2022–2024: Everton Viña del Mar
- 2024: Defensa y Justicia
- 2025: O'Higgins
- 2026: Universidad de Chile

Francisco Meneghini Correa (born 13 August 1988) is an Argentine football manager who recently managed Universidad de Chile.

== Career ==
Meneghini began his career joining the technical staff of Marcelo Bielsa in the Chile national team, as an analyst; he was initially recommended by Bielsa's daughter Inés, who was his classmate. After remaining in the staff under Jorge Sampaoli, he became the assistant coach of Sebastián Beccacece in Defensa y Justicia in 2016.

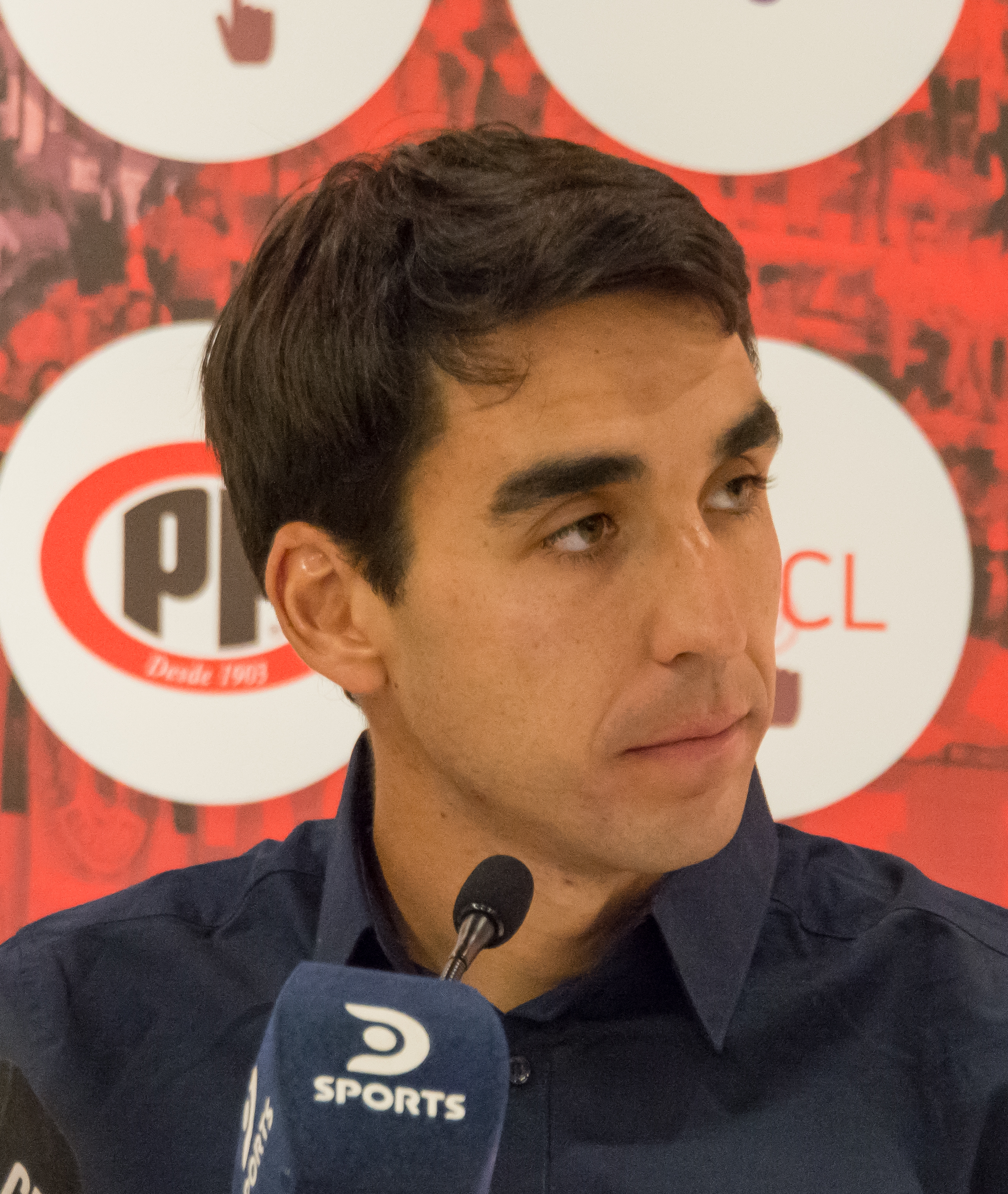
Meneghini as manager of Unión La Calera in 2019

On 9 November 2018, Meneghini returned to Chile after being appointed manager of Unión La Calera in the top division. He remained in charge until 16 September 2019, when he was sacked after a loss to Deportes Antofagasta.

Meneghini was named manager of Audax Italiano also in the top tier on 16 December 2019, but left by mutual consent the following 4 December. He returned to La Calera on 1 July 2021, but opted to leave the club on 5 December, as his contract was due to expire.

On 17 December 2021, Everton de Viña del Mar announced Meneghini as their manager for the upcoming season. He led the side to a qualification to the 2024 Copa Sudamericana, but was sacked on 10 March of that year.

On 23 November 2024, Meneghini took over O'Higgins still in the Chilean top tier. Despite qualifying the side to the 2026 Copa Libertadores, he left on 22 December 2025.

On 29 December 2025, Meneghini was appointed as manager of Universidad de Chile.

== Personal life ==
Meneghini is better known by his nickname Paqui.
