= 2025 Copa Chile =

Copa Chile Coca-Cola Sin Azúcar 2025

Tournament details
- Country: Chile
- Dates: 26 January – 10 December 2025
- Teams: 32

Final positions
- Champions: Huachipato (1st title)
- Runners-up: Deportes Limache
- Copa Libertadores: Huachipato

Tournament statistics
- Matches played: 125
- Goals scored: 349 (2.79 per match)

The 2025 Copa Chile, officially known as Copa Chile Coca-Cola Sin Azúcar 2025 for sponsorship purposes, was the 45th edition of the Copa Chile, the country's national football cup tournament. The tournament began on 26 January and ended on 10 December 2025.

Huachipato were the champions, winning their first Copa Chile title after defeating Deportes Limache 4–3 on penalty kicks following a 1–1 draw in the final. Universidad de Chile were the defending champions, but they were eliminated by Curicó Unido in the round of 16.

== Format ==
For this edition, the Copa Chile had a change in its format, being played only by the 16 Primera División and 16 Primera B teams, leaving out teams from Segunda División Profesional and amateur sides, and the competition featured a group stage for the first time since 2015 instead of the regional and national stages played in the two previous editions. In the group stage, the 32 participating teams were divided into eight groups of four according to geographical location, with each of the four geographical zones in which the competition has been split (North, Central–North, Central–South, and South) being allocated two groups. The top two teams in each group advanced to the knockout stages (round of 16, quarter-finals, semi-finals, and final).

== Prizes ==
The champions of this edition earned the right to compete in the 2026 Copa Libertadores, taking the Chile 4 berth which enabled them to enter the second stage of that competition, provided that they competed in the top flight in the 2026 season. In the event that the winning club failed to fulfill this criterion, it would have been entitled to a monetary prize equivalent to half of the final match's profits and the runners-up would qualify for the Copa Libertadores instead. If the cup runners-up were also ineligible or had already qualified for the Copa Libertadores on league performance, the Liga de Primera's best team not yet qualified would be awarded the Copa Chile's berth. In addition to this, starting from this edition both finalists were also entitled to play the 2026 Supercopa de Chile against the 2025 Liga de Primera champions and runners-up.

== Schedule ==
The group stage draw was held on 15 January 2025, and matches in the group stage were played from 24 January to 12 May 2025.

Round	Draw date	First leg	Second leg
Group stage	15 January 2025	Matchday 1: 26–30 January 2025; Matchday 2: 31 January – 4 February 2025; Matchday 3: 6–12 February 2025; Matchday 4: 21–24 March 2025; Matchday 5: 3–6 April 2025; Matchday 6: 9–12 May 2025	
Round of 16	No draw	6 June – 2 July 2025	11 June – 10 July 2025
Quarter-finals	No draw	9–13 July 2025	13–16 July 2025
Semi-finals	No draw	7–29 September 2025	5–12 October 2025
Final	No draw	10 December 2025	

== Teams ==
32 clubs took part in this edition of the Copa Chile: 16 from Primera División and 16 from Primera B, with their Copa Chile ranking in brackets. This edition of the competition did not have any teams from lower tiers, nor amateur invitees.

=== Primera División ===
- Audax Italiano (11)
- Cobresal (14)
- Colo-Colo (1)
- Coquimbo Unido (12)
- Deportes Iquique (17)
- Deportes La Serena (21)
- Deportes Limache (41)
- Everton (8)
- Huachipato (9)
- Ñublense (10)
- O'Higgins (13)
- Palestino (6)
- Unión Española (3)
- Unión La Calera (25)
- Universidad Católica (5)
- Universidad de Chile (2)

=== Primera B ===
- Cobreloa (7)
- Curicó Unido (22)
- Deportes Antofagasta (19)
- Deportes Concepción (33)
- Deportes Copiapó (30)
- Deportes Recoleta (39)
- Deportes Santa Cruz (32)
- Deportes Temuco (18)
- Magallanes (4)
- Rangers (24)
- San Luis (29)
- San Marcos de Arica (28)
- Santiago Morning (27)
- Santiago Wanderers (16)
- Unión San Felipe (26)
- Universidad de Concepción (15)

== Group stage ==
=== Group A ===
Pos	Team	Pld	W	D	L	GF	GA	GD	Pts	Qualification	ANT	COB	CDC	IQQ
1	Deportes Antofagasta	6	3	1	2	10	12	−2	10	Advance to the knockout stage	—	0–3	2–1	3–1
2	Cobreloa	6	2	3	1	8	4	+4	9	Advance to the knockout stage	1–1	—	3–0	0–0
3	Deportes Copiapó	6	2	1	3	9	9	0	7		4–0	1–1	—	1–0
4	Deportes Iquique	6	2	1	3	8	10	−2	7		2–4	2–0	3–2	—

Source: Campeonato Chileno, Soccerway
Legend: Blue = home team win; Yellow = draw; Red = away team win.
Rules for classification: 1) Points; 2) Goal difference; 3) Matches won; 4) Goals for; 5) Away goals for; 6) Red cards; 7) Yellow cards; 8) Copa Chile ranking; 9) Drawing of lots.

=== Group B ===
Pos	Team	Pld	W	D	L	GF	GA	GD	Pts	Qualification	LIM	SW	CC	USF
1	Deportes Limache	6	3	2	1	12	7	+5	11	Advance to the knockout stage	—	1–2	4–1	1–1
2	Santiago Wanderers	6	3	1	2	6	5	+1	10	Advance to the knockout stage	0–2	—	1–0	0–1
3	Colo-Colo	6	2	2	2	8	7	+1	8		2–2	0–0	—	4–0
4	Unión San Felipe	6	1	1	4	4	11	−7	4		1–2	1–3	0–1	—

Source: Campeonato Chileno, Soccerway
Legend: Blue = home team win; Yellow = draw; Red = away team win.
Rules for classification: 1) Points; 2) Goal difference; 3) Matches won; 4) Goals for; 5) Away goals for; 6) Red cards; 7) Yellow cards; 8) Copa Chile ranking; 9) Drawing of lots.

=== Group C ===
Pos	Team	Pld	W	D	L	GF	GA	GD	Pts	Qualification	DLS	COQ	SMA	CSL
1	Deportes La Serena	6	3	2	1	8	5	+3	11	Advance to the knockout stage	—	2–0	2–1	1–1
2	Coquimbo Unido	6	2	3	1	8	5	+3	9	Advance to the knockout stage	1–1	—	3–0	0–0
3	San Marcos de Arica	6	2	1	3	6	11	−5	7		1–0	2–2	—	2–1
4	Cobresal	6	1	2	3	6	7	−1	5		1–2	0–2	3–0	—

Source: Campeonato Chileno, Soccerway
Legend: Blue = home team win; Yellow = draw; Red = away team win.
Rules for classification: 1) Points; 2) Goal difference; 3) Matches won; 4) Goals for; 5) Away goals for; 6) Red cards; 7) Yellow cards; 8) Copa Chile ranking; 9) Drawing of lots.

=== Group D ===
Pos	Team	Pld	W	D	L	GF	GA	GD	Pts	Qualification	ULC	SLQ	EVE	UC
1	Unión La Calera	6	3	2	1	5	4	+1	11	Advance to the knockout stage	—	0–0	1–0	2–2
2	San Luis	6	3	1	2	8	7	+1	10	Advance to the knockout stage	0–1	—	3–2	2–1
3	Everton	6	3	0	3	7	6	+1	9		2–0	1–0	—	2–1
4	Universidad Católica	6	1	1	4	7	10	−3	4		0–1	2–3	1–0	—

Source: Campeonato Chileno, Soccerway
Legend: Blue = home team win; Yellow = draw; Red = away team win.
Rules for classification: 1) Points; 2) Goal difference; 3) Matches won; 4) Goals for; 5) Away goals for; 6) Red cards; 7) Yellow cards; 8) Copa Chile ranking; 9) Drawing of lots.

=== Group E ===
Pos	Team	Pld	W	D	L	GF	GA	GD	Pts	Qualification	AUD	DCO	UE	PAL
1	Audax Italiano	6	3	3	0	9	4	+5	12	Advance to the knockout stage	—	2–1	3–1	2–2
2	Deportes Concepción	6	2	2	2	10	13	−3	8	Advance to the knockout stage	0–0	—	1–0	3–2
3	Unión Española	6	2	1	3	10	7	+3	7		0–0	5–1	—	3–0
4	Palestino	6	1	2	3	10	15	−5	5		0–2	4–4	2–1	—

Source: Campeonato Chileno, Soccerway
Legend: Blue = home team win; Yellow = draw; Red = away team win.
Rules for classification: 1) Points; 2) Goal difference; 3) Matches won; 4) Goals for; 5) Away goals for; 6) Red cards; 7) Yellow cards; 8) Copa Chile ranking; 9) Drawing of lots.

=== Group F ===
Pos	Team	Pld	W	D	L	GF	GA	GD	Pts	Qualification	HUA	TEM	RAN	OHI
1	Huachipato	6	3	2	1	11	5	+6	11	Advance to the knockout stage	—	5–0	2–0	2–1
2	Deportes Temuco	6	2	2	2	9	12	−3	8	Advance to the knockout stage	4–2	—	3–2	1–1
3	Rangers	6	2	1	3	5	8	−3	7		0–0	1–0	—	1–0
4	O'Higgins	6	1	3	2	6	6	0	6		0–0	1–1	3–1	—

Source: Campeonato Chileno, Soccerway
Legend: Blue = home team win; Yellow = draw; Red = away team win.
Rules for classification: 1) Points; 2) Goal difference; 3) Matches won; 4) Goals for; 5) Away goals for; 6) Red cards; 7) Yellow cards; 8) Copa Chile ranking; 9) Drawing of lots.

=== Group G ===
Pos	Team	Pld	W	D	L	GF	GA	GD	Pts	Qualification	UCH	MAG	SM	REC
1	Universidad de Chile	6	4	1	1	16	5	+11	13	Advance to the knockout stage	—	0–1	3–0	1–1
2	Magallanes	6	4	1	1	7	4	+3	13	Advance to the knockout stage	1–3	—	0–0	2–0
3	Santiago Morning	6	1	2	3	3	8	−5	5		1–3	1–2	—	1–0
4	Deportes Recoleta	6	0	2	4	2	11	−9	2		1–6	0–1	0–0	—

Source: Campeonato Chileno, Soccerway
Legend: Blue = home team win; Yellow = draw; Red = away team win.
Rules for classification: 1) Points; 2) Goal difference; 3) Matches won; 4) Goals for; 5) Away goals for; 6) Red cards; 7) Yellow cards; 8) Copa Chile ranking; 9) Drawing of lots.

=== Group H ===
Pos	Team	Pld	W	D	L	GF	GA	GD	Pts	Qualification	ÑUB	CUR	UDC	DSC
1	Ñublense	6	3	1	2	13	11	+2	10	Advance to the knockout stage	—	3–2	2–0	2–2
2	Curicó Unido	6	2	2	2	7	6	+1	8 (Note: Away goals for: Curicó Unido 5, Universidad de Concepción 4.)	Advance to the knockout stage	2–1	—	0–1	0–0
3	Universidad de Concepción	6	2	2	2	7	6	+1	8		2–3	1–1	—	0–0
4	Deportes Santa Cruz	6	1	3	2	5	9	−4	6		3–2	0–2	0–3	—

Source: Campeonato Chileno, Soccerway
Legend: Blue = home team win; Yellow = draw; Red = away team win.
Rules for classification: 1) Points; 2) Goal difference; 3) Matches won; 4) Goals for; 5) Away goals for; 6) Red cards; 7) Yellow cards; 8) Copa Chile ranking; 9) Drawing of lots.

== Knockout stage ==
=== Bracket ===
Round of 16
22	Curicó Unido	2	2	4
2	Universidad de Chile	1	2	3
18	Deportes Temuco	1	0	1
11	Audax Italiano	2	2	4
4	Magallanes	1	0	1
10	Ñublense	1	2	3
33	Deportes Concepción	1	0	1
9	Huachipato	1	2	3
7	Cobreloa	1	0	1
41	Deportes Limache	3	3	6
12	Coquimbo Unido	2	4	6
25	Unión La Calera	1	1	2
29	San Luis	3	1	4
21	Deportes La Serena	1	4	5
16	Santiago Wanderers	3	3	6
19	Deportes Antofagasta	0	2	2

Quarter-finals
22	Curicó Unido	0	0	0
11	Audax Italiano	1	1	2
10	Ñublense	2	1	3
9	Huachipato	2	2	4
41	Deportes Limache	2	3	5
12	Coquimbo Unido	1	2	3
21	Deportes La Serena	4	5	9
16	Santiago Wanderers	2	1	3

Semi-finals
11	Audax Italiano	1	2	3
9	Huachipato	0	4	4
41	Deportes Limache	2	6	8
21	Deportes La Serena	0	1	1

Final
9	Huachipato (p)	1 (4)
41	Deportes Limache	1 (3)

=== Round of 16 ===
Team 1	Agg.	Team 2	1st leg	2nd leg
Santiago Wanderers	6–2	Deportes Antofagasta	3–0	3–2
San Luis	4–5	Deportes La Serena	3–1	1–4
Cobreloa	1–6	Deportes Limache	1–3	0–3
Coquimbo Unido	6–1	Unión La Calera	2–1	4–1
Deportes Temuco	1–4	Audax Italiano	1–2	0–2
Curicó Unido	4–3	Universidad de Chile	2–1	2–2
Deportes Concepción	1–3	Huachipato	1–1	0–2
Magallanes	1–3	Ñublense	1–1	0–2

==== First leg ====
6 June 2025	San Luis	3–1	Deportes La Serena	Quillota
19:00 UTC−4	Juárez 33'; Avello 57'; Carreño 63'	Report	Ferreyra 39'	Stadium: Municipal Lucio Fariña Fernández; Referee: Víctor Abarzúa

7 June 2025	Magallanes	1–1	Ñublense	San Bernardo, Santiago
12:30 UTC−4	Aránguiz 90+6' (pen.)	Report	Plaza 13'	Stadium: Municipal Luis Navarro Avilés; Referee: Fernando Véjar

7 June 2025	Deportes Temuco	1–2	Audax Italiano	Temuco
17:30 UTC−4	Villegas 36'	Report	González 18'; Troyansky 55'	Stadium: Municipal Germán Becker; Referee: Héctor Jona

8 June 2025	Santiago Wanderers	3–0	Deportes Antofagasta	Quillota
12:30 UTC−4	Duma 18'; Pereyra 50', 69'	Report		Stadium: Municipal Lucio Fariña Fernández; Referee: Cristián Droguett

8 June 2025	Curicó Unido	2–1	Universidad de Chile	Talcahuano
12:30 UTC−4	N. Fernández 32'; Bustamante 41'	Report	L. Fernández 45' (pen.)	Stadium: Huachipato-CAP Acero; Referee: Cristián Galaz

8 June 2025	Cobreloa	1–3	Deportes Limache	Calama
15:00 UTC−4	Ponce 90+3' (pen.)	Report	Salgado 6'; Jara 45+2', 60'	Stadium: Zorros del Desierto; Referee: Matías Assadi

8 June 2025	Coquimbo Unido	2–1	Unión La Calera	Coquimbo
17:30 UTC−4	Galani 2'; Cabrera 76'	Report	Campos 30'	Stadium: Municipal Francisco Sánchez Rumoroso; Referee: Miguel Araos

2 July 2025	Deportes Concepción	1–1	Huachipato	Concepción
19:30 UTC−4	Larrivey 61' (pen.)	Report	Altamirano 44'	Stadium: Ester Roa; Referee: Rodrigo Rivera

==== Second leg ====
11 June 2025	Universidad de Chile	2–2 (3–4 agg.)	Curicó Unido	Ñuñoa, Santiago
18:00 UTC−4	Zaldivia 38'; Assadi 90+1'	Report	Aliaga 46'; N. Fernández 69'	Stadium: Nacional Julio Martínez Prádanos; Referee: Mario Salvo

30 June 2025	Deportes Antofagasta	2–3 (2–6 agg.)	Santiago Wanderers	Antofagasta
19:00 UTC−4	Felipe 9' (o.g.); Figueroa 51' (pen.)	Report	Pereyra 39'; Cuadra 76', 88'	Stadium: Regional Calvo y Bascuñán; Referee: Rodrigo Carvajal

1 July 2025	Audax Italiano	2–0 (4–1 agg.)	Deportes Temuco	La Florida, Santiago
18:00 UTC−4	Espejo 4', 12'	Report		Stadium: Bicentenario; Referee: Benjamín Saravia

1 July 2025	Ñublense	2–0 (3–1 agg.)	Magallanes	Chillán
19:00 UTC−4	Sosa 37' (pen.), 70'	Report		Stadium: Municipal Nelson Oyarzún Arenas; Referee: Reinerio Alvarado

1 July 2025	Deportes Limache	3–0 (6–1 agg.)	Cobreloa	La Calera
19:30 UTC−4	Da Silva 18', 84' (pen.); Jara 85'	Report		Stadium: Municipal Nicolás Chahuán Nazar; Referee: Piero Maza

2 July 2025	Unión La Calera	1–4 (2–6 agg.)	Coquimbo Unido	La Calera
15:00 UTC−4	Sáez 7'	Report	Salinas 11'; Galani 34'; Johansen 37'; Palavecino 90+4'	Stadium: Municipal Nicolás Chahuán Nazar; Referee: Franco Jiménez

2 July 2025	Deportes La Serena	4–1 (5–4 agg.)	San Luis	La Serena
18:00 UTC−4	Jara 8'; Chamorro 23'; Rojas 63'; Gutiérrez 69'	Report	Araya 79' (pen.)	Stadium: La Portada; Referee: Gastón Philippe

10 July 2025	Huachipato	2–0 (3–1 agg.)	Deportes Concepción	Talcahuano
18:00 UTC−4	M. Gutiérrez 52'; Altamirano 87'	Report		Stadium: Huachipato-CAP Acero; Referee: Manuel Vergara

=== Quarter-finals ===
Team 1	Agg.	Team 2	1st leg	2nd leg
Deportes La Serena	9–3	Santiago Wanderers	4–2	5–1
Deportes Limache	5–3	Coquimbo Unido	2–1	3–2
Curicó Unido	0–2	Audax Italiano	0–1	0–1
Ñublense	3–4	Huachipato	2–2	1–2

==== First leg ====
9 July 2025	Curicó Unido	0–1	Audax Italiano	Molina
15:00 UTC−4		Report	Valencia 77'	Stadium: Municipal; Referee: Héctor Jona

9 July 2025	Deportes La Serena	4–2	Santiago Wanderers	La Serena
19:00 UTC−4	Pinto 31'; Jara 58'; Chamorro 69'; Rojas 87' (pen.)	Report	Cuadra 79'; Espinoza 90+2'	Stadium: La Portada; Referee: Cristián Garay

10 July 2025	Deportes Limache	2–1	Coquimbo Unido	La Calera
20:30 UTC−4	Peñailillo 4'; Romero 6'	Report	Salinas 23'	Stadium: Municipal Nicolás Chahuán Nazar; Referee: Francisco Gilabert

13 July 2025	Ñublense	2–2	Huachipato	Chillán
17:30 UTC−4	Ávalos 9'; Rodríguez 34'	Report	Altamirano 58'; M. Gutiérrez 64'	Stadium: Municipal Nelson Oyarzún Arenas; Referee: Felipe González

==== Second leg ====
13 July 2025	Coquimbo Unido	2–3 (3–5 agg.)	Deportes Limache	Coquimbo
15:00 UTC−4	Waterman 69'; Johansen 85' (pen.)	Report	Portilla 28'; Da Silva 57'; Castro 90+4'	Stadium: Municipal Francisco Sánchez Rumoroso; Referee: Reinerio Alvarado

16 July 2025	Santiago Wanderers	1–5 (3–9 agg.)	Deportes La Serena	Quillota
12:30 UTC−4	Espinoza 15'	Report	Vargas 14' (pen.); Chamorro 33'; Jara 36'; Pinto 65'; Gallegos 88'	Stadium: Municipal Lucio Fariña Fernández; Referee: Nicolás Gamboa

16 July 2025	Huachipato	2–1 (4–3 agg.)	Ñublense	Talcahuano
15:00 UTC−4	Altamirano 14'; M. Gutiérrez 26'	Report	Sosa 90+7'	Stadium: Huachipato-CAP Acero; Referee: Cristián Garay

16 July 2025	Audax Italiano	1–0 (2–0 agg.)	Curicó Unido	La Florida, Santiago
18:00 UTC−4	Valencia 67'	Report		Stadium: Bicentenario; Referee: Diego Flores

=== Semi-finals ===
Team 1	Agg.	Team 2	1st leg	2nd leg
Deportes Limache	8–1	Deportes La Serena	2–0	6–1
Audax Italiano	3–4	Huachipato	1–0	2–4

==== First leg ====
7 September 2025	Deportes Limache	2–0	Deportes La Serena	Quillota
20:00 UTC−3	Guerra 55'; Pinares 90+2'	Report		Stadium: Municipal Lucio Fariña Fernández; Referee: Claudio Díaz

29 September 2025	Audax Italiano	1–0	Huachipato	La Florida, Santiago
19:00 UTC−3	Matus 67'	Report		Stadium: Bicentenario; Referee: Miguel Araos

==== Second leg ====
5 October 2025	Huachipato	4–2 (4–3 agg.)	Audax Italiano	Talcahuano
17:30 UTC−3	Altamirano 26', 39'; Malanca 51'; M. Gutiérrez 89'	Report	Vargas 12'; Valencia 79' (pen.)	Stadium: Huachipato-CAP Acero; Referee: Gastón Philippe

12 October 2025	Deportes La Serena	1–6 (1–8 agg.)	Deportes Limache	La Serena
15:00 UTC−3	Fuentes 23'	Report	Pons 3', 56'; Castro 8', 54'; Guerra 70'; Fritz 81' (pen.)	Stadium: La Portada; Referee: Juan Lara

=== Final ===
10 December 2025
20:00 UTC−3

Huachipato	1–1	Deportes Limache
Villanueva 90+6'	Report	Pons 53'
Penalties
M. Gutiérrez (penalty scored); Villanueva (penalty scored); Altamirano (penalty scored); Martínez (penalty missed); Sepúlveda (penalty scored)	4–3	(penalty missed) Arce; (penalty scored) Guerra; (penalty scored) Parot; (penalty scored) Pacheco; (penalty missed) Pons

Estadio El Teniente, Rancagua
Referee: Piero Maza

== See also ==
- 2025 Chilean Primera División
- 2025 Primera B de Chile
- 2025 Supercopa de Chile
