= 2024 Campeonato Nacional Primera B =

Primera B de Chile
- Season: 2024
- Dates: 23 February – 7 December 2024
- Champions: Deportes La Serena (4th title)
- Promoted: Deportes La Serena; Deportes Limache
- Relegated: Barnechea
- Matches: 248
- Goals: 624 (2.52 per match)
- Top goalscorer: Lionel Altamirano (22 goals)
- Biggest home win: Santiago Wanderers 6–0 San Luis (5 June); Barnechea 6–0 Dep. Limache (19 October)
- Biggest away win: San Luis 0–6 Barnechea (19 August)
- Highest scoring: Magallanes 7–1 San Luis (19 October)

The 2024 Primera B de Chile, also known as Campeonato Ascenso Clínicas ACHS Salud 2024 due to sponsorship by the Chilean Safety Association (ACHS), was the 70th season of the Primera B de Chile, Chile's second-tier football league. The fixture for the season was announced on 24 January 2024, with the competition beginning on 23 February and ending on 7 December 2024.

Deportes La Serena won their fourth Primera B de Chile title in this season, securing both the championship and promotion to the Chilean Primera División with three matchdays to go in the regular season after a 1–0 win against Deportes Recoleta and a 3–2 loss for Barnechea against Deportes Antofagasta on 29 September. The other promoted side was Deportes Limache, who won the promotion play-offs after defeating Rangers on penalty kicks in the finals.

== Format ==
The competition was run under the same format used in the most recent seasons, in which the 16 participating teams played each other in a double round-robin tournament (once at home and once away) for a total of 30 matches, with the top team at the end of the 30 rounds winning the championship as well as promotion to the Campeonato Nacional for the following season. The next seven best-placed teams at the end of the regular season took part in a play-off tournament (known as Liguilla) to decide the second promoted team, with the league runners-up receiving a bye to the semi-finals. The playoffs winning team was the second and last promoted team to the top flight for the following season. The bottom-placed team at the end of the regular season was relegated to the Segunda División Profesional.

== Teams ==
Locations of the 2024 Primera B de Chile teams
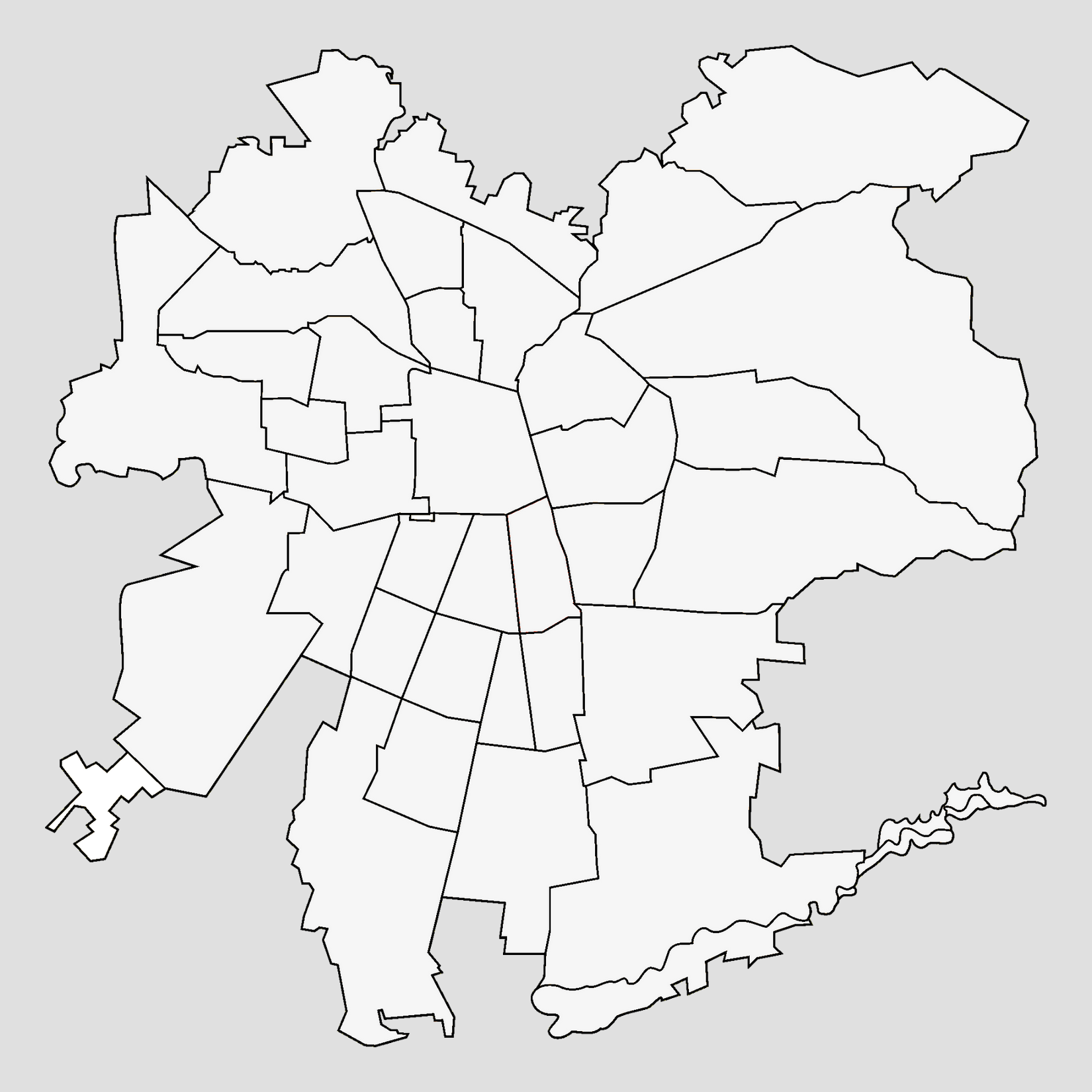
Locations of the 2024 Primera B de Chile teams in Santiago.

The tournament was played by 16 teams, 13 of them returning from the previous season, two relegated from the 2023 Campeonato Nacional (Magallanes and Curicó Unido), and the 2023 Segunda División Profesional champions Deportes Limache. These teams replaced Cobreloa and Deportes Iquique, who were promoted to the 2024 Campeonato Nacional, as well as Deportes Puerto Montt, relegated to Segunda División for this season.

=== Stadia and locations ===
Club	City	Stadium	Capacity
Barnechea	Santiago (Lo Barnechea)	Municipal de Lo Barnechea	3,000
Curicó Unido	Curicó	La Granja	8,278
Deportes Antofagasta	Antofagasta	Calvo y Bascuñán	21,178
Deportes La Serena	La Serena	La Portada	18,243
Deportes Limache	Limache	Nicolás Chahuán Nazar (Note: Deportes Limache played their home matches at Estadio Municipal Nicolás Chahuán Nazar in La Calera since their regular stadium Estadio Gustavo Ocaranza in Limache does not meet ANFP requirements.)	9,200
Deportes Recoleta	Santiago (Recoleta)	Leonel Sánchez Lineros	1,000
Deportes Santa Cruz	Santa Cruz	Joaquín Muñoz García	5,000
Deportes Temuco	Temuco	Germán Becker	18,413
Magallanes	Santiago (San Bernardo)	Luis Navarro Avilés	3,500
Rangers	Talca	Fiscal de Talca	8,200
San Luis	Quillota	Lucio Fariña Fernández	7,680
San Marcos de Arica	Arica	Carlos Dittborn	9,746
Santiago Morning	Santiago (La Pintana)	Municipal de La Pintana	6,000
Santiago Wanderers	Valparaíso	Elías Figueroa Brander	20,575
Unión San Felipe	San Felipe	Municipal de San Felipe	12,000
Universidad de Concepción	Concepción	Alcaldesa Ester Roa Rebolledo	30,448

== Standings ==
Pos	Team	Pld	W	D	L	GF	GA	GD	Pts	Qualification or relegation
1	Deportes La Serena (C, P)	30	21	7	2	42	15	+27	70	Promotion to Primera División
2	Magallanes	30	15	7	8	46	29	+17	52	Advance to Promotion play-off semi-finals
3	Rangers	30	14	8	8	42	34	+8	50	Advance to Promotion play-off quarter-finals
4	Deportes Antofagasta	30	11	10	9	43	36	+7	43	Advance to Promotion play-off quarter-finals
5	Deportes Recoleta	30	11	7	12	38	35	+3	40	Advance to Promotion play-off quarter-finals
6	Santiago Morning	30	11	7	12	35	35	0	40	Advance to Promotion play-off quarter-finals
7	Deportes Limache (O, P)	30	11	7	12	42	43	−1	40	Advance to Promotion play-off quarter-finals
8	Deportes Santa Cruz	30	11	7	12	43	47	−4	40	Advance to Promotion play-off quarter-finals
9	Universidad de Concepción	30	11	7	12	33	39	−6	40	
10	Santiago Wanderers	30	9	11	10	45	39	+6	38	
11	San Marcos de Arica	30	9	8	13	32	35	−3	35	
12	Deportes Temuco	30	9	6	15	30	37	−7	33	
13	San Luis	30	7	7	16	29	56	−27	28	
14	Unión San Felipe	30	6	8	16	27	47	−20	26	
15	Curicó Unido (Note: Curicó Unido were deducted three points as punishment for delayed payments in February 2024 and a further six points for incomplete payments of wages.)	30	9	7	14	29	41	−12	25	
16	Barnechea (Note: Barnechea were deducted 45 points as punishment for not showing up to their matches against Deportes Recoleta, Rangers, and Deportes La Serena due to the withdrawal of their Clubs License.) (R)	30	14	8	8	51	39	+12	5	Relegation to Segunda División Profesional

Source: ANFP, Soccerway
Rules for classification: 1) Points, 2) Goal difference, 3) Matches won, 4) Goals for, 5) Away goals for, 6) Red cards, 7) Yellow cards, 8) Drawing of lots, 9) Play-off game (only if needed to decide championship).
If needed to decide championship between two teams: 2) Play-off game.
(C) Champions; (O) Play-off winners; (P) Promoted; (R) Relegated

== Results ==
Home \ Away	BAR	CUR	ANT	DLS	LIM	REC	DSC	TEM	MAG	RAN	SLQ	SMA	SM	SW	USF	UDC
Barnechea	—	4–1	0–0	0–3 (Note: Match awarded 0–3 to Deportes La Serena due to the withdrawal of Barnechea's Clubs License.)	6–0	0–3 (Note: Match awarded 0–3 to Deportes Recoleta due to the withdrawal of Barnechea's Clubs License.)	4–2	2–1	0–2	2–1	2–3	1–1	2–0	2–1	1–0	0–0
Curicó Unido	0–1	—	0–2	1–2	0–3	1–0	1–2	0–0	0–0	0–2	1–0	1–0	2–1	2–2	2–0	2–3
Deportes Antofagasta	3–2	1–1	—	0–1	1–2	3–0	3–2	0–1	2–1	1–1	1–1	2–1	0–0	1–2	4–1	3–0
Deportes La Serena	0–0	1–0	2–1	—	2–0	1–0	2–1	4–2	1–0	0–0	2–0	2–1	1–0	1–2	3–0	1–0
Deportes Limache	2–2	2–0	1–3	1–0	—	1–0	0–1	0–1	2–2	0–1	2–1	1–3	2–2	2–2	1–2	0–1
Deportes Recoleta	1–2	2–1	2–2	0–0	0–3	—	1–0	2–1	0–1	2–2	1–2	1–2	1–1	3–1	0–0	5–0
Deportes Santa Cruz	1–1	1–0	2–1	1–1	1–1	1–2	—	3–1	3–1	2–4	1–1	1–0	0–1	1–2	0–2	3–0
Deportes Temuco	0–1	1–1	1–0	0–1	2–3	2–3	1–1	—	1–0	0–1	0–3	0–0	0–1	2–0	4–0	1–0
Magallanes	3–0	0–0	1–0	1–2	2–2	1–1	4–1	3–1	—	0–1	7–1	0–2	2–1	2–1	2–1	0–0
Rangers	3–0 (Note: Match awarded 3–0 to Rangers due to the withdrawal of Barnechea's Clubs License.)	2–3	4–0	1–1	2–0	1–2	1–1	1–0	2–3	—	2–4	0–0	0–0	1–0	1–1	1–2
San Luis	0–6	0–2	2–2	0–1	0–5	1–0	1–2	1–1	0–1	1–2	—	1–1	1–3	0–0	3–1	2–0
San Marcos de Arica	1–4	2–3	1–1	1–1	0–2	2–1	3–4	0–1	0–1	0–1	1–0	—	2–0	0–0	1–2	1–1
Santiago Morning	3–1	0–1	0–1	2–4	1–0	2–1	2–1	2–1	0–2	0–1	4–0	0–1	—	1–1	0–1	2–1
Santiago Wanderers	1–1	2–2	1–2	0–1	1–1	1–1	1–2	2–1	2–3	4–0	6–0	2–0	2–2	—	3–0	0–3 (Note: Match suspended and awarded 0–3 to Universidad de Concepción after Santiago Wanderers failed to provide security guards.)
Unión San Felipe	1–2	3–1	1–1	0–0	2–3	0–1	1–1	2–3	0–0	1–2	0–0	0–2	2–2	1–2	—	1–0
Universidad de Concepción	2–2	2–0	2–2	0–1	2–0	0–2	4–1	0–0	2–1	2–1	1–0	1–3	1–2	1–1	2–1	—

Source: ANFP, Soccerway
Legend: Blue = home team win; Yellow = draw; Red = away team win.

== Promotion play-off ==
The teams placed from second to eighth place in the regular season played a double-legged knockout competition with the regular season runner-up getting a bye to the semi-finals. The winning side claimed the last promotion spot to Primera División for the next season.

=== Bracket ===
Quarter-finals
7	Deportes Limache	2	4	6
4	Deportes Antofagasta	1	0	1
6	Santiago Morning	1	1	2
5	Deportes Recoleta	1	2	3
8	Deportes Santa Cruz	1	2	3
3	Rangers	2	2	4

Semi-finals
7	Deportes Limache (p)	1	1	2 (4)
2	Magallanes	1	1	2 (3)
5	Deportes Recoleta	0	0	0
3	Rangers	1	0	1

Finals
7	Deportes Limache (p)	3	1	4 (4)
3	Rangers	1	3	4 (3)

=== Quarter-finals ===
12 November 2024
20:30 UTC−3

Deportes Santa Cruz	1–2	Rangers
Pinto 7'	Report	Márquez 33'; Felipe 60'

Estadio Municipal Joaquín Muñoz García, Santa Cruz
Attendance: 2,528
Referee: Miguel Araos
17 November 2024
20:30 UTC−3

Rangers	2–2	Deportes Santa Cruz
Reyes 45'; Díaz 85'	Report	Ledezma 10'; Pinto 46'

Estadio Fiscal, Talca
Referee: José Cabero

Rangers won 4–3 on aggregate.

13 November 2024
18:00 UTC−3

Deportes Limache	2–1	Deportes Antofagasta
Fritz 28'; Tarifeño 85'	Report	Ubilla 71'

Estadio Municipal Nicolás Chahuán Nazar, La Calera
Referee: Rodrigo Carvajal
17 November 2024
12:30 UTC−3

Deportes Antofagasta	0–4	Deportes Limache
	Report	Castro 64', 68'; Flores 81' (pen.); C. Díaz 90+6' (o.g.)

Estadio Regional Calvo y Bascuñán, Antofagasta
Referee: Felipe González

Deportes Limache won 6–1 on aggregate.

12 November 2024
18:00 UTC−3

Santiago Morning	1–1	Deportes Recoleta
Manríquez 62'	Report	Riveros 38'

Estadio Municipal, La Pintana
Referee: Fernando Véjar
16 November 2024
17:30 UTC−3

Deportes Recoleta	2–1	Santiago Morning
Estigarribia 35'; Fuenzalida 90+6'	Report	Díaz 32'

Estadio Municipal Leonel Sánchez Lineros, Recoleta
Referee: Juan Lara

Deportes Recoleta won 3–2 on aggregate.

=== Semi-finals ===
26 November 2024
20:30 UTC−3

Deportes Limache	1–1	Magallanes
Da Silva 67' (pen.)	Report	Vicuña 61'

Estadio Municipal Nicolás Chahuán Nazar, La Calera
Referee: Fernando Véjar
30 November 2024
17:30 UTC−3

Magallanes	1–1	Deportes Limache
Vicuña 8'	Report	Da Silva 75'
Penalties
Jorquera (penalty scored); Espinoza (penalty missed); Rivera (penalty missed); Larrivey (penalty scored); Cuadra (penalty scored); Zamorano (penalty scored)	3–4	(penalty scored) Provoste; (penalty scored) Fritz; (penalty missed) Flores; (penalty missed) Jara; (penalty scored) Da Silva; (penalty scored) Moreira

Estadio Municipal Luis Navarro Avilés, San Bernardo
Referee: Felipe González

Tied 2–2 on aggregate, Deportes Limache won on penalties.

26 November 2024
18:00 UTC−3

Deportes Recoleta	0–1	Rangers
	Report	Márquez 20'

Estadio Municipal, La Pintana
Referee: Cristian Garay
30 November 2024
20:00 UTC−3

Rangers	0–0	Deportes Recoleta
	Report

Estadio Fiscal, Talca
Referee: Piero Maza

Rangers won 1–0 on aggregate.

=== Finals ===
3 December 2024
20:00 UTC−3

Deportes Limache	3–1	Rangers
Castro 34', 59'; Jara 78'	Report	Felipe 82'

Estadio Municipal Nicolás Chahuán Nazar, La Calera
Attendance: 3,997
Referee: Cristian Garay

7 December 2024
18:00 UTC−3

Rangers	3–1 (a.e.t.)	Deportes Limache
González 34', 56' (pen.); Gotti 48'	Report	Fritz 80' (pen.)
Penalties
Ábalos (penalty missed); Moya (penalty scored); Márquez (penalty scored); Díaz (penalty scored); San Juan (penalty missed)	3–4	(penalty scored) Provoste; (penalty scored) Fritz; (penalty scored) Jara; (penalty scored) Paz; (penalty missed) Da Silva

Estadio Fiscal, Talca
Referee: José Cabero

Tied 4–4 on aggregate, Deportes Limache won on penalties and promoted to the Chilean Primera División.

== Top scorers ==
Rank	Player	Club	Goals
1	(Argentina) Lionel Altamirano	Deportes La Serena	22
2	(Chile) Gonzalo Tapia	Barnechea	21
3	(Argentina) Joaquín Larrivey	Magallanes	19
4	(Argentina) Nelson Da Silva	Deportes Limache	15
5	(Argentina) Juan Ignacio Duma	Santiago Wanderers	11
5	(Chile) Harol Salgado	Barnechea	11
7	(Paraguay) Mauro Caballero	San Luis	10
7	(Argentina) Juan Sánchez Sotelo	Universidad de Concepción	10
9	(Uruguay) Diego González	Deportes Santa Cruz	9
9	(Argentina) Mauro Quiroga	Deportes Antofagasta	9

Source: Soccerway

== See also ==
- 2024 Chilean Primera División
- 2024 Copa Chile
- 2024 Supercopa de Chile
