= Juan Figueroa =

Juan Figueroa may refer to:

- Juan Figueroa (activist) (born 1953), Puerto Rican activist
- Juan Figueroa (Argentine footballer) (born 1992), Argentine goalkeeper
- Juan Figueroa (Chilean footballer) (born 2003)
