= Joaquín Gutiérrez (footballer) =

Chilean footballer (born 2002)

Personal information
- Full name: Joaquín Ignacio Gutiérrez Jara
- Date of birth: 4 July 2002 (age 24)
- Place of birth: Chiguayante, Chile
- Height: 1.72 m (5 ft 8 in)
- Position: Right-back

Team information
- Current team: Deportes La Serena (on loan from Huachipato)

Youth career
- Huachipato

Senior career*
Years	Team	Apps	(Gls)
2020–	Huachipato	129	(5)
2026–	→ Deportes La Serena (loan)	0	(0)

International career^{‡}
2018–2019	Chile U17	1	(0)
2020	Chile U20	3	(0)
2024	Chile U23	3	(0)
- * Club domestic league appearances and goals as of 4 January 2026 ‡ National team caps and goals as of 13 February 2024

Joaquín Ignacio Gutiérrez Jara (born July 4, 2002) is a Chilean professional footballer who plays as a right-back for Chilean Primera División club Deportes La Serena on loan from Huachipato.

== Club career ==
Gutiérrez was promoted to Huachipato's main squad on 2020, and made his professional debut in a 2020 Primera División match against Deportes La Serena on September 25, 2020.

On 4 January 2026, Gutiérrez joined Deportes La Serena on a one-year loan.

== International career ==
Gutiérrez was part of the Chile U17 squad at the 2019 South American U-17 Championship, where Chile was the runner-up, but he didn't make any appearance. Also, he represented Chile U20, as team captain, in a friendly tournament played in Teresópolis (Brazil) called Granja Comary International Tournament, playing all matches against Peru U20, Bolivia U20, and Brazil U20.

Gutiérrez was called up to the training microcycle of Chile's senior team on 2021. He received his first senior call-up for friendly matches in June 2023, being named to the bench in the match against Cuba.

In 2024, he took part in the Pre-Olympic Tournament.

== Personal life ==
He is nicknamed Guti, a hypocoristic of "Gutiérrez".

His younger brother, Maximiliano, is also a right-back from the Huachipato youth system.

== Honours ==
Huachipato

- Chilean Primera División: 2023
- Copa Chile: 2025
