= Marcos Sepúlveda =

Chilean footballer

Personal information
- Full name: Marcos Leonardo Sepúlveda San Juan
- Date of birth: 21 May 1976 (age 50)
- Place of birth: Chillán, Chile
- Position: Forward

Youth career
- Deportivo Zaragoza
- Unión Católica
- Ñublense

Senior career*
Years	Team	Apps	(Gls)
1994–1996	Ñublense	30	(1)
1997	Deportes Linares		(8)
1998	Ñublense		(8)
1999	Gimnasia LP		
1999	Santiago Morning	11	(1)
2000	O'Higgins		
2000	Ñublense		(11)
2001	Fernández Vial		(7)
2002	Arema Malang		
2003–2004	Fernández Vial		(3)
2006–2007	Provincial Osorno		(10)
2008	Curicó Unido		(4)

Managerial career
- Ñublense (youth)
- 2013: Ñublense B
- 2013–2016: Ñublense (youth)
- 2017: CD Buenos Aires
- 2019: Independiente de Cauquenes
- * Club domestic league appearances and goals

Marcos Leonardo Sepúlveda San Juan (born 21 May 1976) is a Chilean former professional footballer who played as a forward for clubs in Chile, Argentina and Indonesia.

== Playing career ==
Born in Chillán, Chile, as a youth player, Sepúlveda was with the local clubs Deportivo Zaragoza and Unión Católica before joining Ñublense youth ranks.

A well remembered player of Ñublense in three stints (1994–96, 1998 and 2000), he made his professional debut thanks to the coach Eduardo de la Barra in 1994, taking part in the 1995 Copa Chile where the team reached the semi-finals after knocking-out Huachipato and Colo-Colo.

In his homeland he also played for Deportes Linares (1997), Santiago Morning (1999), O'Higgins (2000), Fernández Vial (2001, 2003–04), Provincial Osorno (2006–07) and Curicó Unido (2008).

Abroad, he had stints with Gimnasia LP in the Argentine Primera División and Arema Malang in the 2002 Liga Indonesia Premier Division.

He retired in 2008 after playing for Curicó Unido.

== Coaching career ==
Sepúlveda began his career as coach at the Ñublense youth ranks, leading the B-team in the Segunda División Profesional in 2013.

In 2017, he coached Club Deportivo Buenos Aires from Parral in the fifth level of the Chilean football.

In 2019, he coached Independiente de Cauquenes in the Segunda División Profesional.

After he worked as football coach and motivational teller for the Municipality of Chillán until June 2020, being fired in the context of the COVID-19 pandemic.

== Honours ==
Curicó Unido

- Primera B de Chile: 2008
