= Eduardo de la Barra =

Eduardo de la Barra may refer to:

- Eduardo de la Barra (writer) (1839–1900), Chilean writer, diplomat, and geographer
- Eduardo de la Barra (footballer) (1959–2025), Chilean football player and manager
