= Maximiliano Gutiérrez =

Chilean footballer

- Gutiérrez with Huachipato in 2025.

Personal information
- Full name: Maximiliano José Gutiérrez Jara
- Date of birth: 3 May 2004 (age 22)
- Place of birth: Chiguayante, Chile
- Height: 1.83 m (6 ft 0 in)
- Positions: Right winger; right-back

Team information
- Current team: Dynamo Moscow
- Number: 28

Youth career
- Huachipato

Senior career*
Years	Team	Apps	(Gls)
2022–2026	Huachipato	54	(9)
2026	→ Independiente (loan)	14	(3)
2026	Independiente	0	(0)
2026–	Dynamo Moscow	7	(0)

International career^{‡}
- Chile U15
- Chile U17
2022	Chile U20	2	(0)
2025–	Chile	12	(4)
- * Club domestic league appearances and goals as of 22 November 2026 ‡ National team caps and goals as of 17 November 2026

Maximiliano José Gutiérrez Jara (born 3 May 2004), also known as Maxi Gutiérrez, is a Chilean footballer who plays as a right winger for Russian Premier League club Dynamo Moscow and the Chile national team. He can also operate as a right-back.

== Club career ==
A product of the Huachipato youth system, Gutiérrez won the Chilean national under-21 championship with the reserve team. He made his senior debut in the Copa Chile match against Coquimbo Unido on 18 August 2022. At league level, he made his debut in the match against Palestino on 5 November of the same year.

On 21 February 2026, Gutiérrez signed with Argentine club Independiente on a loan for a year with an obligation to buy in January 2027.

In September 2026, Gutiérrez was transferred to Russian club Dynamo Moscow and signed a five-year contract.

== International career ==
Gutiérrez has represented Chile at under-15, under-17 and under-20 level. With the under-20's, he made an appearance in the friendly match against Paraguay on 8 April 2022.

At senior level, he received his first call up for the friendly match against Panama on 8 February 2025. Later, he made his debut in the 2026 FIFA World Cup qualification match against Brazil on 4 September 2025.

== Personal life ==
His older brother, Joaquín, is also a right-back from the Huachipato youth system.

== Career statistics ==
=== Club ===
As of 22 November 2026

Club	Season	League			Cup		Continental		Other		Total	
Club	Season	Division	Apps	Goals	Apps	Goals	Apps	Goals	Apps	Goals	Apps	Goals
Huachipato	2022	Liga de Primera	1	0	5	0	—		—		6	0
Huachipato	2023	Liga de Primera	0	0	0	0	—		—		0	0
Huachipato	2024	Liga de Primera	26	3	3	0	9 (Note: Five appearances, one goal in Copa Libertadores, four appearances in Copa Sudamericana)	1	—		38	4
Huachipato	2025	Liga de Primera	24	3	11	4	—		—		35	7
Huachipato	2026	Liga de Primera	3	3	—		1 (Note: Appearance in Copa Libertadores)	0	1 (Note: Appearance in Supercopa de Chile)	0	5	3
Huachipato	Total		54	9	19	4	10	1	1	0	84	14
Independiente (loan)	2026	AFA Liga Profesional de Fútbol	14	3	2	1	—		1 (Note: Appearance in Apertura play-off)	0	17	4
Dynamo Moscow	2026–27	Russian Premier League	7	0	2	0	—		—		9	0
Career total			75	12	23	5	10	1	2	0	110	18

=== International ===
As of match played 17 November 2026

Appearances and goals by national team and year
National team	Year	Apps	Goals
Chile	2025	3	1
Chile	2026	9	3
Total		12	4

Scores and results list Chile's goal tally first, score column indicates score after each Gutiérrez goal.

List of international goals scored by Maximiliano Gutiérrez
No.	Date	Venue	Opponent	Score	Result	Competition
1	10 October 2025	Estadio Bicentenario de La Florida, Santiago, Chile	Peru	2–1	2–1	Friendly
2	27 March 2026	Eden Park, Auckland, New Zealand	Cape Verde	2–2	4–2	2026 FIFA Series
3	29 September 2026	Energizer Park, St. Louis, United States	United States	2–1	2–4	Friendly
4	6 October 2026	Los Angeles Memorial Coliseum, Los Angeles, United States	Mexico	1–0	2–0	Friendly

== Honours ==
Huachipato

- Chilean Primera División: 2023
- Copa Chile: 2025
