= Gonzalo Jara =

Gonzalo Jara may refer to:

- Gonzalo Jara (footballer, born 1985), Chilean footballer
- Gonzalo Jara (footballer, born 1998), Chilean footballer
