= Juan Figueroa (Chilean footballer) =

Chilean footballer

Personal information
- Full name: Juan Ignacio Figueroa Araya
- Date of birth: 26 September 2003 (age 23)
- Place of birth: Talcahuano, Chile
- Height: 1.70 m (5 ft 7 in)
- Position: Winger

Team information
- Current team: Huachipato
- Number: 11

Youth career
- Huachipato

Senior career*
Years	Team	Apps	(Gls)
2023–	Huachipato	17	(0)
2024	→ Deportes La Serena (loan)	27	(1)
- * Club domestic league appearances and goals as of 11 December 2025

Juan Ignacio Figueroa Araya (born 26 September 2003) is a Chilean professional footballer who plays as a winger for Huachipato.

== Club career ==
A product of the Huachipato youth system, Figueroa made his professional debut in the 1–3 away win against Teniente Merino for the 2023 Copa Chile on 9 April.

In January 2024, Figueroa was loaned out to Deportes La Serena in the Primera B de Chile, winning the league title. Back to Huachipato in 2025, he won the Copa Chile.

== International career ==
In 2022, Figueroa took part in training microcycles of Chile U20 under Patricio Ormazábal.

== Honours ==
Huachipato

- Chilean Primera División: 2023
- Copa Chile: 2025

Deportes La Serena

- Primera B de Chile: 2024
