= Fernando Cavalleri (footballer) =

Argentine–Chilean footballer and manager (1949–2017)

Personal information
- Full name: Fernando Oscar Cavalleri Guerrero
- Date of birth: 8 September 1949
- Place of birth: Rosario, Argentina
- Date of death: 3 October 2017 (aged 68)
- Place of death: Santiago, Chile
- Height: 1.74 m (5 ft 9 in)
- Position: Midfielder

Senior career*
Years	Team	Apps	(Gls)
1964	Morning Star		
1965–1970	Gimnasia LP		
1971	Antofagasta Portuario	26	(6)
1972	Jorge Wilstermann		
1972	Stormers		
1973	Antofagasta Portuario	27	(9)
1974–1976	Palestino	25	(3)
1974	→ Unión San Felipe (loan)	31	(10)
1975	→ Deportes Concepción (loan)	35	(11)
1977	Universidad Católica	18	(2)
1978–1980	Deportes Concepción	82	(24)
1981	Everton	15	(1)
1982–1983	Deportes Concepción		
1984	Lota Schwager		

Managerial career
- 1986: Atlético Paraná
- 1986: Quilmes
- 1987–1988: Provincial Osorno
- 1989–1990: Deportes Concepción
- 1991–1992: Cobreloa
- 1992: Palestino
- 1993: Unión Española (assistant)
- 1993–1996: Deportes Concepción
- 1998–1999: Deportivo Italchacao
- 1999–2000: Coquimbo Unido
- 2001: Deportes Concepción
- 2002–2003: Chile U20 (assistant)
- 2003: Chile U20
- 2005–2007: Deportes Puerto Montt
- 2007: Deportes Concepción
- 2009–2010: Deportes Concepción
- 2010: Rangers
- * Club domestic league appearances and goals

Fernando Oscar Cavalleri Guerrero (8 September 1949 – 3 October 2017) was an Argentine naturalized Chilean football player and manager.

== Playing career ==
Born in Rosario, Argentina, Cavalleri made his professional debut with Morning Star in his city of birth and then played for Gimnasia La Plata from 1965 to 1970, where he coincided with players such as Jorge Spedaletti, Hugo Gatti and Delio Onnis. In 1970 he emigrated to Chile to join Universidad de Chile, but he finally signed with Antofagasta Portuario in the Chilean Primera División.

After a stint in Bolivia with Jorge Wilstermann and Stormers, he returned to Antofagasta Portuario in 1973 and played in Chile until his retirement in 1984, becoming a historical player of Deportes Concepción.

== Managerial career ==
Cavalleri began his career in his country of birth with Atlético Paraná and Quilmes. Then he returned to Chile where he worked until 2010, with a stint in Venezuela with Deportivo Italchacao in the 1998–99 season, winning the league title.

He also was the assistant of both Nelson Acosta in Unión Española (1993) and César Vaccia in the Chile national under-20 team (2002–03). He led Chile U20 in the 2003 South American Championship since Vaccia was in charge of Chile at under-17 level.

He stood out as manager of Deportes Concepción by coaching them in 313 matches in total and having won the 1994 Segunda División de Chile.

== Personal life ==
Cavalleri naturalized Chilean by residence in 1980 and made his home in Chile.

In Argentina, he was nicknamed Petete, like a comics character, by their teams, but he was better known as Palito Cavalleri (Thin Stick) due to his thinness.

Cavalleri was the uncle of the professional footballer Matías Cavalleri.

== Honours ==
Deportes Concepción

- Chilean Segunda División: 1994

Deportivo Italchacao

- Venezuelan Primera División: 1998–99
