= Antonio Zaracho =

Paraguayan footballer

Personal information
- Full name: Antonio Román Zaracho Núñez
- Date of birth: 13 June 1957 (age 69)
- Place of birth: Asunción, Paraguay
- Position: Goalkeeper

Team information
- Current team: Deportes Concepción (women) (manager)

Senior career*
Years	Team	Apps	(Gls)
1977	Tacuary		
1978–1979	Deportivo Táchira		
1980	Resistencia		
1981–1982	Nacional Asunción		
1983–1984	Deportes Antofagasta	38	(0)
1985	San Luis	34	(0)
1986–1991	Huachipato	170	(0)
1992	Fernández Vial	23	(0)
1993	Frutilinares	–	(–)
1994–1997	Deportes Concepción	64	(0)
1998–1999	Cobresal	51	(0)
2000	General Caballero ZC		

Managerial career
- 2004: Paraguay U20 (gk coach)
- Nacional Asunción (gk coach)
- 2007–2008: Huachipato
- 2008: Deportes Concepción
- 2011–2019: Deportes Concepción (youth)
- 2011: Deportes Concepción (caretaker)
- 2014: Deportes Concepción (caretaker)
- 2015: Deportes Concepción (caretaker)
- 2019: Fernández Vial (youth)
- 2019: Fernández Vial (caretaker)
- 2021–2023: Fernández Vial (women)
- 2025–: Deportes Concepción (women)
- * Club domestic league appearances and goals

Antonio Román Zaracho Núñez (born 13 June 1957) is a Paraguayan naturalized Chilean football manager and former footballer who played as a goalkeeper.

== Club career ==
A Paraguayan goalkeeper, Zaracho developed the most part of his career in the Chilean Primera División. He came to Deportes Antofagasta in 1983 and switched to San Luis de Quillota in 1985.

In 1986, Zaracho joined Huachipato and became a historical player for playing for them until 1991.

The next years, Zaracho played for Fernández Vial, Frutilinares, Deportes Concepción and Cobresal. He won the Segunda División de Chile with Deportes Concepción in 1994 and Cobresal in 1998.

== Coaching career ==
Zaracho started his career as goalkeeping coach for Paraguay at the 2004 Summer Olympics, winning the silver medal, and Nacional.

Back in Chile, Zaracho led Huachipato and Deportes Concepción in 2007 and 2008.

As coach for the Deportes Concepción youth teams, Zaracho assumed as interim coach for the first team several times.

As coach of the Fernández Vial under-19 team, he led them replacing the first team in the 2019 Segunda División Profesional.

The next years, Zaracho switched to women's football with the Fernández Vial and Deportes Concepción.

Zaracho also leads an eponymous football academy alongside former footballer Fernando Lazcano.

== Personal life ==
Zaracho naturalized Chilean by residence in 1992.
