= Claudio Sepúlveda =

Chilean footballer (born 1992)

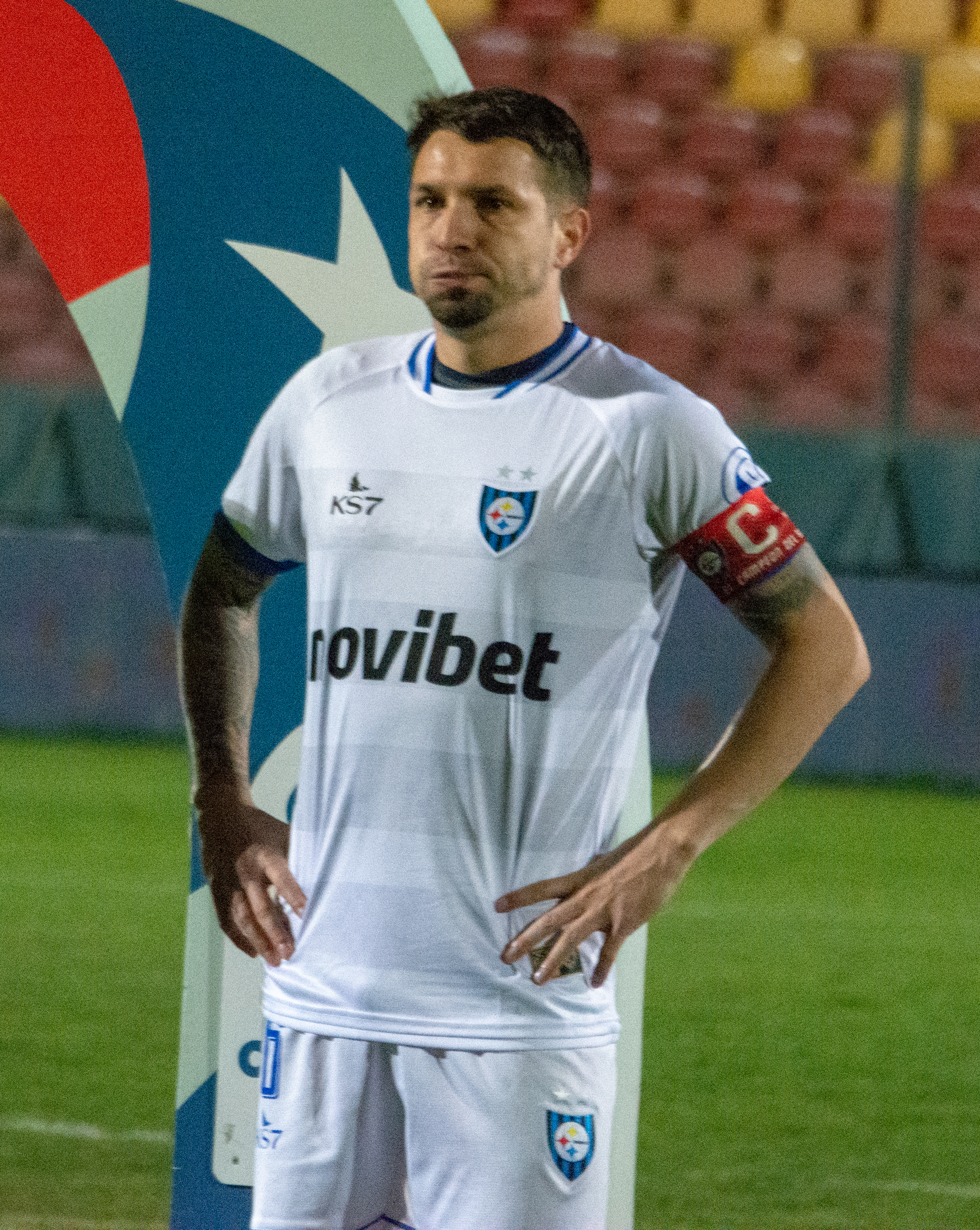
- Sepúlveda with Huachipato in 2023

Personal information
- Full name: Claudio Elías Sepúlveda Castro
- Date of birth: June 19, 1992 (age 34)
- Place of birth: Santiago, Chile
- Height: 1.74 m (5 ft 9 in)
- Position: Defensive midfielder

Team information
- Current team: Huachipato
- Number: 6

Youth career
- 2007–2010: Universidad Católica

Senior career*
Years	Team	Apps	(Gls)
2012–2017	Universidad Católica	57	(0)
2011	→ Rangers (loan)	33	(0)
2015–2017	→ Huachipato (loan)	62	(6)
2017–	Huachipato	143	(9)
- * Club domestic league appearances and goals as of 21 January 2021

Claudio Elías Sepúlveda Castro (Note: In this Spanish name, the first or paternal surname is Sepúlveda and the second or maternal family name is Castro.) (born 19 June 1992), known as Claudio Sepúlveda, is a Chilean footballer who plays as defensive midfielder, and captains Huachipato in Chile's Primera División. He is Huachipato's record appearance holder, with 335 matches played for the club.

== Honours ==
Huachipato

- Chilean Primera División: 2023
- Copa Chile: 2025
