= Carlos Orlandelli =

Argentine football player and manager

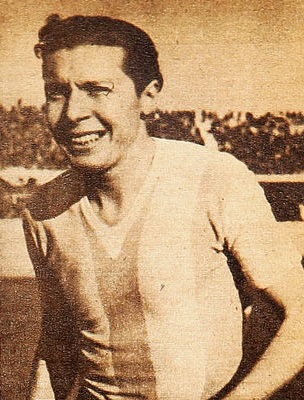
- Orlandelli in 1948

Personal information
- Full name: Carlos Alberto Orlandelli Medina
- Date of birth: 23 September 1918
- Place of birth: Buenos Aires, Argentina
- Date of death: 22 September 1992 (aged 73)
- Place of death: Viña del Mar, Chile
- Position: Right midfielder

Senior career*
Years	Team	Apps	(Gls)
1937	Platense		
1940–1941	Santiago Wanderers		
1942–1949	Magallanes		
1950	Emelec		

Managerial career
- 1950: Emelec (player-manager)
- 1954: Magallanes
- 1956: San Luis
- 1957: Ferrobádminton
- 1959: Magallanes
- 1960–1961: O'Higgins
- 1962: Universidad Técnica
- 1966: Deportes Concepción
- * Club domestic league appearances and goals

Carlos Alberto Orlandelli Medina (23 September 1918 – 22 September 1992) was an Argentine football midfielder and manager.

== Playing career ==
A right midfielder, Orlandelli joined Platense for the 1937 Argentine Primera División from Liga Cordobesa de Fútbol. Later, he moved to Chile to play for Santiago Wanderers and Magallanes. His last club was Ecuadorian side Emelec in 1950 as a player-manager.

== Coaching career ==
Orlandelli started to coach Emelec in 1950. He returned to Chile and led clubs in the top division such as Magallanes, San Luis de Quillota, Ferrobádminton and O'Higgins.

In the Chilean second division, he also led Universidad Técnica del Estado and Deportes Concepción.
