= Lionel Altamirano =

Argentine footballer

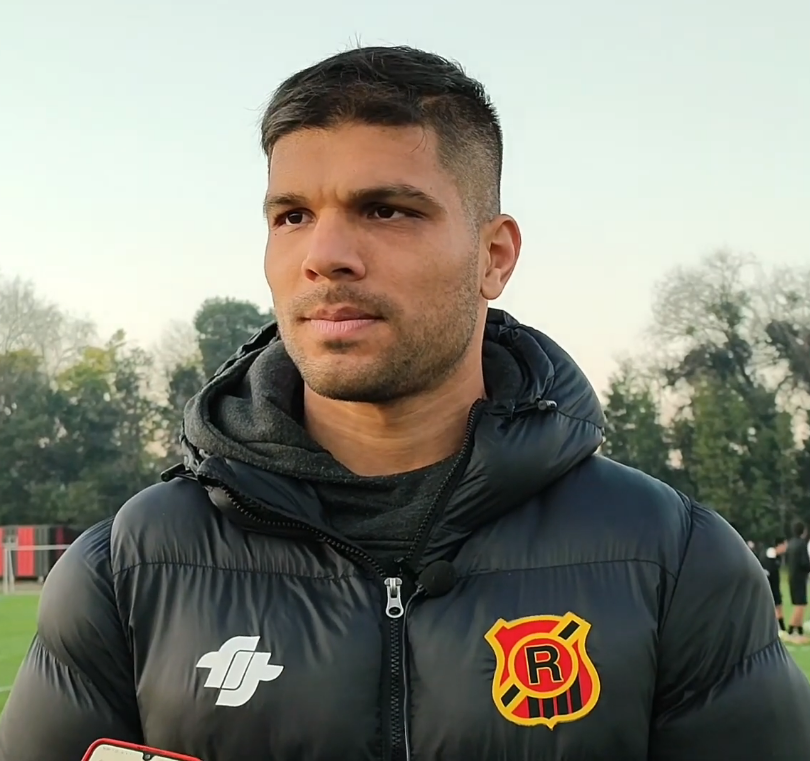
- Altamirano with Rangers in 2022

Personal information
- Full name: Lionel Alejandro Altamirano
- Date of birth: 11 November 1992 (age 34)
- Place of birth: Laguna Paiva, Santa Fe, Argentina
- Height: 1.82 m (6 ft 0 in)
- Position: Striker

Team information
- Current team: Huachipato
- Number: 9

Youth career
- Atlético Rafaela
- Unión Santa Fe

Senior career*
Years	Team	Apps	(Gls)
2012–2014	Unión Santa Fe	12	(0)
2012–2013	→ Deportivo Merlo (loan)	11	(0)
2015	Altos Hornos Zapla	26	(4)
2016–2017	Colegiales	50	(17)
2017–2018	Estudiantes BA	51	(23)
2019	Santiago Wanderers	21	(5)
2020–2021	Deportes Puerto Montt	25	(11)
2021	Universidad de Concepción	28	(11)
2022–2023	Rangers	54	(24)
2024	Deportes La Serena	29	(22)
2025–	Huachipato	28	(12)
- * Club domestic league appearances and goals as of 28 April 2024

Lionel Alejandro Altamirano (born 11 November 1992) is an Argentine footballer who plays as a striker for Chilean club Huachipato.

== Club career ==
Born in Laguna Paiva, Santa Fe, Argentina, Altamirano was with Atlético Rafaela before joining Unión de Santa Fe. He was promoted to the first team in 2012 by Frank Kudelka. In July of the same year, he was loaned to Deportivo Merlo. He returned to Unión in April 2013.

In 2015, he played for Altos Hornos Zapla. The next year, he switched to Colegiales de Munro.

In the second half of 2017, Altamirano joined Estudiantes de Buenos Aires.

In 2019, he moved to Chile and signed with Santiago Wanderers. The next season, he joined Deportes Puerto Montt, switching to Universidad de Concepción in March 2021.

In 2022 and 2023, Altamirano played for Rangers de Talca. In 2024, he switched to Deportes La Serena.

Altamirano joined Huachipato for the 2025 season in the Chilean top level.

== Personal life ==
Lionel is the nephew of the former Argentine international footballer, Ricardo Altamirano.

== Honours ==
Rangers

- Primera B de Chile: 2019

Deportes La Serena

- Primera B de Chile: 2024

Huachipato

- Copa Chile: 2025

Individual

- Primera B de Chile Top Goalscorer: 2024
- Primera B de Chile Best Player: 2024
