= Jonathan Espínola =

Paraguayan footballer

Personal information
- Full name: Jonathan Jesús Espínola
- Date of birth: 18 April 2002 (age 24)
- Place of birth: Iturbe, Paraguay
- Height: 1.80 m (5 ft 11 in)
- Position: Defender

Team information
- Current team: Guaraní
- Number: 24

Youth career
- 2021: Magallanes

Senior career*
Years	Team	Apps	(Gls)
2021–2023	Magallanes	8	(0)
2023	→ Deportes Concepción (loan)	12	(1)
2024–2026	Deportes Concepción	40	(3)
2026–	Guaraní	1	(0)
- * Club domestic league appearances and goals as of 28 July 2026

Jonathan Jesús Espínola (born 18 April 2002) is a Paraguayan footballer who plays as a defender for Paraguayan Primera División club Guaraní. He can operate as a left-back or a centre-back.

== Club career ==
Espínola started his career with Chilean club Magallanes in 2021. A player during a successful stint of the club, he was part of the squad that won the 2022 Primera B, the 2022 Copa Chile and the 2023 Supercopa de Chile. He continued with them for the 2023 Primera División and was loaned out to Deportes Concepción for the second half of 2023.

In 2024, Espínola continued with Deportes Concepción. An important player, he helped them to get two consecutives promotions to the 2025 Primera B de Chile winning the 2024 Segunda División Profesional de Chile, and the 2026 Liga de Primera.

In June 2026, Espínola ended his contract with Deportes Concepción and returned to his homeland signing with Guaraní in the top division. He made his debut with Guaraní in the 1–2 home loss against Sportivo Luqueño on 27 July.
