= Sergio Núñez =

Uruguayan footballer (born 2000)

Personal information
- Full name: Sergio Fabián Núñez Rosas
- Date of birth: 30 June 2000 (age 26)
- Place of birth: Paysandú, Uruguay
- Height: 1.77 m (5 ft 10 in)
- Position: Forward

Team information
- Current team: Huachipato (on loan from Liverpool Montevideo)

Youth career
- 2016–2020: Peñarol

Senior career*
Years	Team	Apps	(Gls)
2020–2023	Peñarol	16	(0)
2021	→ Cerrito (loan)	9	(0)
2023	→ AEL (loan)	3	(1)
2023–2024	Cerro Largo	30	(9)
2024–	Liverpool Montevideo	12	(1)
2025	→ Danubio (loan)	36	(5)
2026	→ Barcelona SC (loan)	8	(1)
2026–	→ Huachipato (loan)	0	(0)
- * Club domestic league appearances and goals as of 19 August 2026

Sergio Fabián Núñez Rosas (born 30 June 2000) is a Uruguayan professional footballer who plays as a forward for Chilean club Huachipato on loan from Liverpool Montevideo.

== Career ==
A youth academy graduate of Peñarol, Núñez made his professional debut on 16 August 2020 in Peñarol's 2–0 win against Boston River. In April 2021, he joined Cerrito on a season long loan deal.

On 12 January 2023, Greek club AEL announced the signing of Núñez on a one-year loan deal.

On 19 August 2026, Núñez joined Chilean club Huachipato on loan from Liverpool Montevideo.

== Career statistics ==
As of 29 January 2023

Appearances and goals by club, season and competition
Club	Season	League			Cup		Continental		Other		Total	
Club	Season	Division	Apps	Goals	Apps	Goals	Apps	Goals	Apps	Goals	Apps	Goals
Peñarol	2020	Uruguayan Primera División	9	0	—		0	0	—		9	0
Peñarol	2021	Uruguayan Primera División	0	0	—		0	0	0	0	0	0
Peñarol	2022	Uruguayan Primera División	7	0	3	1	0	0	0	0	10	1
Peñarol	Total		16	0	3	1	0	0	0	0	19	1
Cerrito (loan)	2021	Uruguayan Primera División	9	0	—		—		—		9	0
AEL (loan)	2022–23	Super League Greece 2	1	1	—		—		—		1	1
Career total			26	1	3	1	0	0	0	0	29	2
