= Diego Carrasco (footballer) =

Chilean footballer (born 1995)

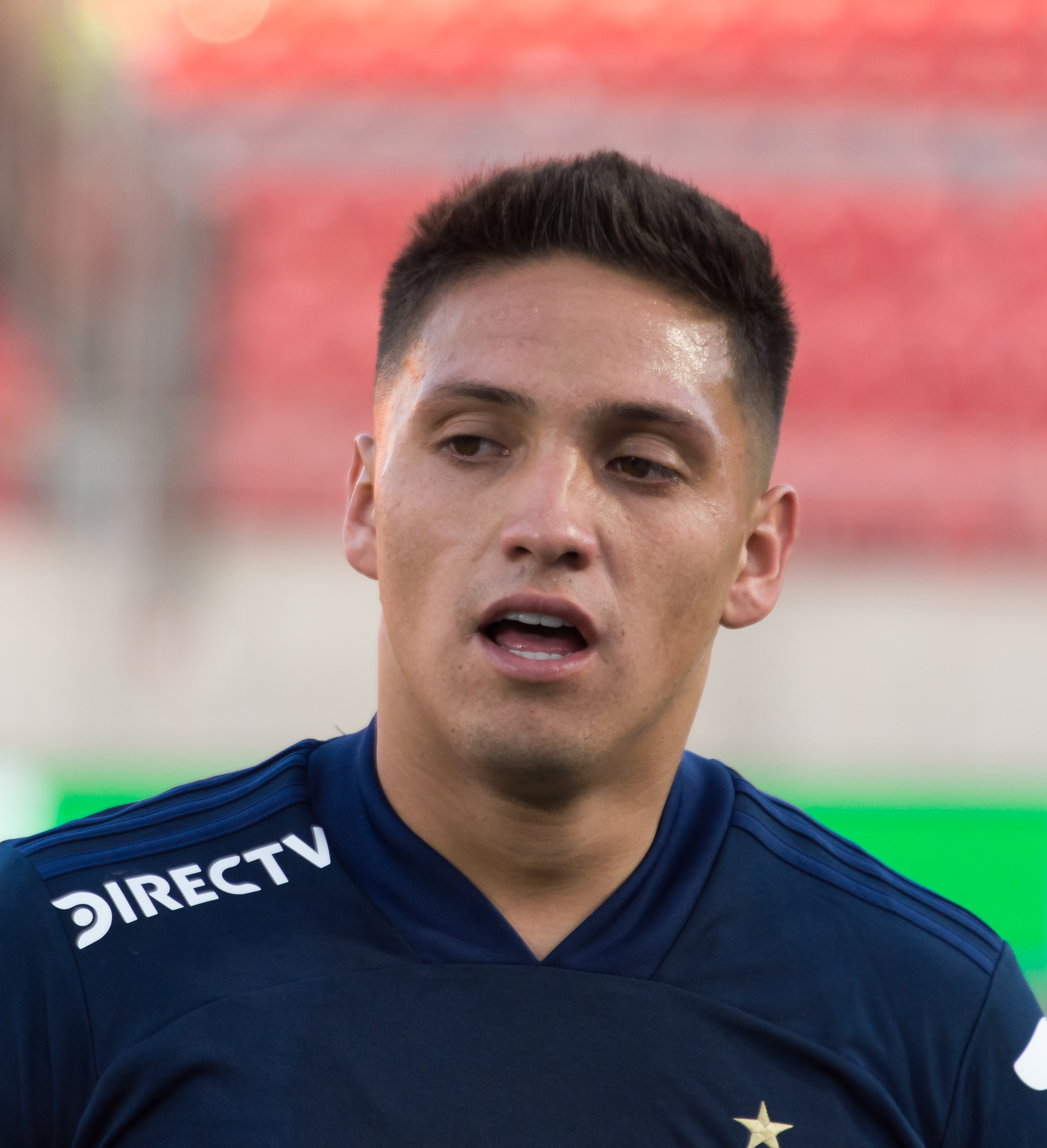
- Carrasco with Universidad de Chile in 2020

Personal information
- Full name: Diego Andrés Carrasco Muñoz
- Date of birth: May 25, 1995 (age 31)
- Place of birth: Coquimbo, Chile
- Height: 1.76 m (5 ft 9 in)
- Positions: Centre-back; left-back

Team information
- Current team: Deportes Concepción
- Number: 3

Youth career
- Coquimbo Unido

Senior career*
Years	Team	Apps	(Gls)
2013–2018	Coquimbo Unido	93	(3)
2019–2021	Universidad de Chile	47	(1)
2022	O'Higgins	20	(1)
2023	Coquimbo Unido	20	(1)
2024	Deportes Copiapó	14	(0)
2025–	Deportes Concepción	0	(0)
- * Club domestic league appearances and goals as of 6 January 2025

Diego Andrés Carrasco Muñoz (born May 25, 1995) is a Chilean footballer who currently plays for Deportes Concepción. He can operate as a central defender or left-back.

== Career ==
On 13 July 2013, Carrasco made his professional debut at the age of 18 years in a match from 2013–14 Copa Chile against Deportes Copiapó, playing ninety minutes. He always played along with the pirate team at the Primera B, the second highest level of Chilean football.

On 2018 season, he became team captain and Coquimbo Unido became Primera B's champion getting the promotion to Primera División after defeating Deportes Puerto Montt. So this way, Carrasco earned his first professional title.

On 3 January 2019, Carrasco signed with Universidad de Chile on a deal for three years.

Carrasco returned to Coquimbo Unido for the 2023 season. In 2024, he signed with Deportes Copiapó.

In 2025, Carrasco signed with Deportes Concepción.

== Career statistics ==
=== Club ===
As of 25 September 2020.

Club	Season	League			Cup		Continental		Other		Total	
Club	Season	Division	Apps	Goals	Apps	Goals	Apps	Goals	Apps	Goals	Apps	Goals
Coquimbo Unido	2013–14	Primera B	3	0	1	0	0	0	0	0	4	0
Coquimbo Unido	2014–15	Primera B	25	1	5	0	0	0	0	0	30	1
Coquimbo Unido	2015–16	Primera B	22	0	3	0	0	0	0	0	25	0
Coquimbo Unido	2016–17	Primera B	1	0	0	0	0	0	0	0	1	0
Coquimbo Unido	2017–T	Primera B	13	0	4	0	0	0	0	0	17	0
Coquimbo Unido	2018	Primera B	29	2	0	0	0	0	0	0	29	2
Coquimbo Unido	Total		93	3	13	0	0	0	0	0	106	3
Universidad de Chile	2019	Primera División	12	0	2	0	0	0	0	0	14	0
Universidad de Chile	2020	Primera División	8	1	0	0	2	0	0	0	10	1
Universidad de Chile	Total		20	1	2	0	2 (Note: Appearances in the Copa Libertadores)	0	0	0	24	1
Total career			113	4	15 (Note: Appearances in the Copa Chile)	0	2	0	0	0	130	4

== Personal life ==
He is nicknamed Experiencia (Experience) due to his career, having played many matches being a young player.

== Honours ==
Coquimbo Unido

- Primera B (2): 2014-C (Note: no promotion to Primera División), 2018
