= Renzo Malanca =

Argentine professional footballer

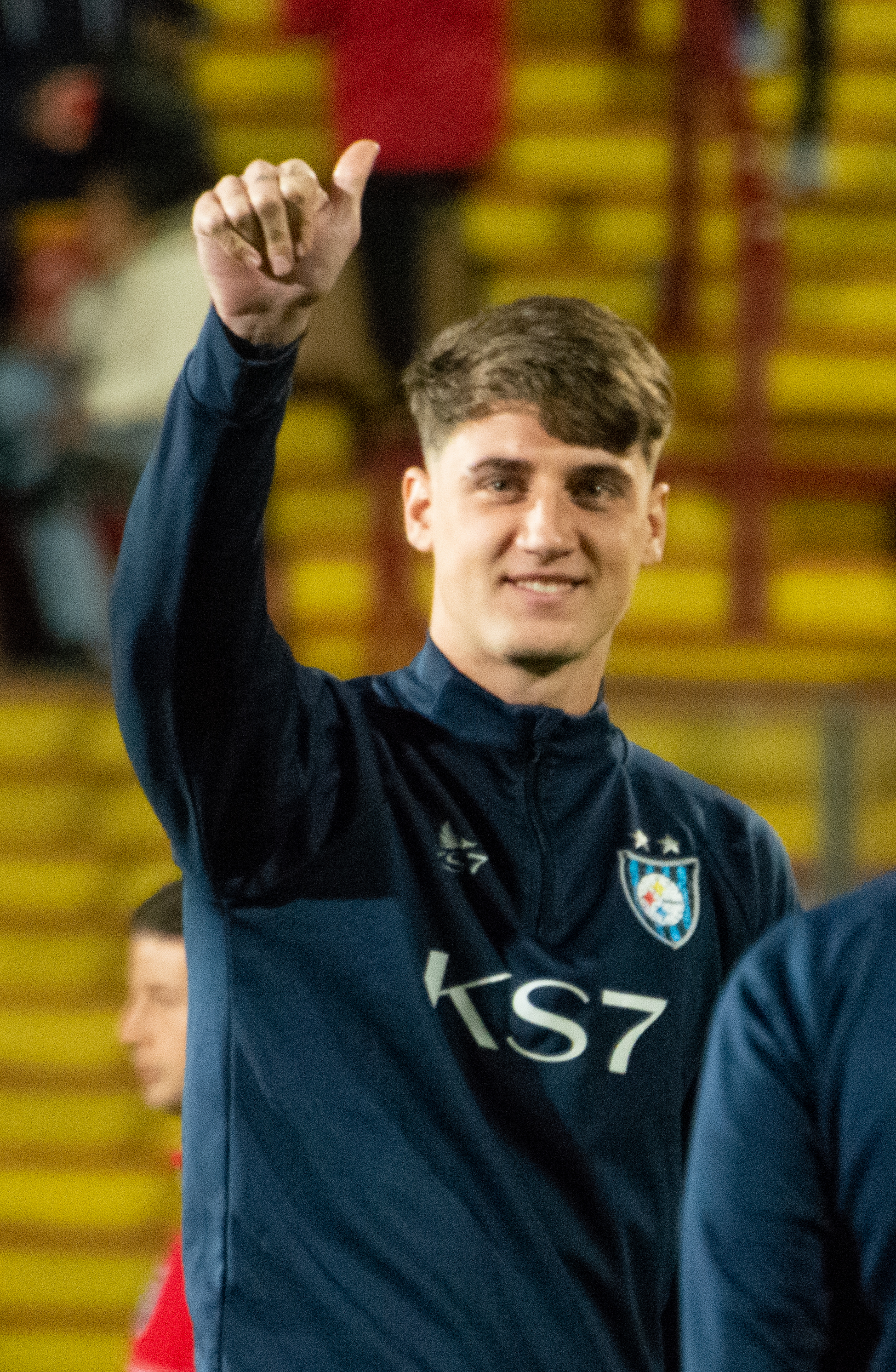
- Malanca with Huachipato in 2023

Personal information
- Full name: Renzo Mariano Malanca
- Date of birth: 6 May 2003 (age 23)
- Place of birth: Guaymallén, Argentina
- Height: 1.92 m (6 ft 4 in)
- Position: Centre-back

Team information
- Current team: Banfield
- Number: 37

Youth career
- Leonardo Murialdo
- 2015–2020: Independiente Rivadavia

Senior career*
Years	Team	Apps	(Gls)
2020–2022	Independiente Rivadavia	24	(0)
2022–2026	Huachipato	82	(2)
2026–	Banfield	3	(0)
- * Club domestic league appearances and goals as of 17:57, 8 November 2026 (UTC)

Renzo Mariano Malanca (born 6 May 2003) is an Argentine professional footballer who plays as a centre-back for Banfield.

== Career ==
Malanca switched Club Leonardo Murialdo for Independiente Rivadavia in 2015. He signed his first professional contract at the age of sixteen on 9 October 2019, becoming the youngest ever player to do so for the club. In the succeeding February, Malanca appeared on the first-team's subs bench for a Primera B Nacional fixture away to Ferro Carril Oeste; though wasn't substituted on by manager Matías Minich. The latter was replaced by Marcelo Straccia midway through the year, with the new coach selecting Malanca to start for his senior debut, aged seventeen, on 3 January 2021 against Alvarado.

In August 2026, Malanca returned to Argentina and signed with Banfield in the top division.

== Personal life ==
In October 2020, Malanca and two other teammates showed possible symptoms of COVID-19 amid the pandemic. They were separated from the main squad, with a player testing positive soon after; though their identity wasn't revealed by Independiente Rivadavia.

== Career statistics ==
As of 5 January 2021.

Appearances and goals by club, season and competition
Club	Season	League			Cup		League Cup		Continental		Other		Total	
Club	Season	Division	Apps	Goals	Apps	Goals	Apps	Goals	Apps	Goals	Apps	Goals	Apps	Goals
Independiente Rivadavia	2019–20	Primera B Nacional	0	0	0	0	—		—		0	0	0	0
Independiente Rivadavia	2020	Primera B Nacional	1	0	0	0	—		—		0	0	1	0
Career total			1	0	0	0	—		—		0	0	1	0

== Honours ==
Huachipato

- Chilean Primera División: 2023
- Copa Chile: 2025
