= Deportes Concepción (Chile) =

Chilean football club

- Full name: Club Social y de Deportes Concepción
- Nicknames: El Conce; El León de Collao; Los Lilas
- Founded: February 24, 1966
- Ground: Estadio Ester Roa; Concepción, Chile
- Capacity: 30,448
- Chairman: Diego Livinsgton
- Manager: Fernando Díaz
- Coach: Fernando Díaz
- League: Liga de Primera
- 2025: Primera B, 6th of 16 (promoted via play-offs)
Home colours	Away colours

Deportes Concepción is a Chilean football club based in the city of Concepción, Biobio Region. As of 2026, they play at the top tier of the Chilean League system, the Liga De Primera.

The club was founded in 1966, by the organizations of several amateur clubs such as Galvarino, Liverpool, Juvenil Unido, Santa Fe and Club Lord Cochrane. The club is one of the most popular in the VIII region of Chile. Their main rivals are Fernández Vial, with whom they play the "clásico penquista" and Huachipato. The club played their home games at Estadio Ester Roa in Concepción, Chile, which seats 30,448 people.

== History ==
The team joined the second level of the Chilean professional league in 1966 and won the tournament a year later, gaining promotion to the Primera División de Chile.

In 1991, the team joined in representing Chile in the Copa Libertadores, they passed through the 1st round phase but lost in the round of sixteen against América de Cali.

In 1993, the club was relegated after finishing 15th of 16 teams, but the club bounced straight back by winning the second division title in 1994.

Concepción played their next big international tournament in 1999, they participated in the Copa CONMEBOL and made it all the way to the semifinals but lost against Talleres de Córdoba from Argentina which was a real disappointment to the fans.

In the year 2001, they once again played the Copa Libertadores and beat rivals such as San Lorenzo from Argentina and Jorge Wilstermann from Bolivia. Once again they made it into the round of sixteen but lost this time to Vasco da Gama from Brazil who had top class players like Romário in their team.

In 2002, the club were again relegated by finishing 15th of 16 teams in the aggregated table, they returned to the topflight in 2004.

In the year 2006, the team was suspended and could not play professionally in the whole year due to debts and unpaid salaries. The club was going to be relegated, but after a legal battle, they were readmitted in the Chilean first division, where they play in 2007. An alternative team (Deportes Concepción B) played that season at the Third level, as well.

In 2016, the club was expelled of the Chilean National League system due to economic problems and returned in 2018 at the last level of the league system, the fifth tier, Tercera B, gaining promotion in their debut season on the category to the next level, the fourth tier Tercera División, for 2019, in which they get a consecutive promotion to the next level, the third tier Segunda División, for 2020.

In 2024, they lost the Segunda División final to Deportes Melipilla. However, a legal battle ensued over payment irregularities by Melipilla, and Melipilla was eventually assigned a three-point penalty. As a result, the ANFP awarded the division title to Deportes Concepción and promoted them to the second-tier Primera B de Chile for 2025.

== Current squad ==
Current squad of Deportes Concepción (Chile) as of 10 September 2026 (edit)
Sources: ANFP Official Web Site

No.		Position	Player
2	CHI	DF	Martín Ramírez
3	CHI	DF	Diego Carrasco
4	CHI	DF	Ariel Cáceres
7	PAR	FW	Fernando Romero (loan from Independiente Rivadavia)
8	PAR	MF	Fernando Martínez
9	CHI	FW	Carlos Escobar
11	CHI	DF	Brayan Véjar (loan from Unión Española)
12	CHI	GK	Nery Veloso
14	CHI	MF	Sebastián Martínez
15	CHI	FW	Joaquín Montecinos
16	CHI	MF	Mario Sandoval
18	URU	MF	Yonatan Rodríguez
19	CHI	FW	Aldrix Jara
20	CHI	MF	Jorge Henríquez
21	URU	DF	Norman Rodríguez (loan from Carabobo)
22	CHI	MF	Misael Dávila
23	CHI	DF	Cristian Riquelme (loan from Colo-Colo)

No.		Position	Player
24	CHI	FW	Matías Cavalleri
25	CHI	GK	Nicolás Araya
26	VEN	MF	Leenhan Romero (loan from Universidad Católica)
27	PAR	FW	Diego Acosta
28	CHI	DF	Mateo González (loan from Universidad de Chile)
29	CHI	DF	Dilan Varas
30	CHI	MF	Ethan Espinoza (loan from Colo-Colo)
31	CHI	MF	Nicolás Fuentes
32	ARG	FW	Joaquín Larrivey (c)
34	CHI	MF	Claudio Toro
36	CHI	GK	Benjamín Sepúlveda
37	ARG	DF	Fausto Grillo
39	CHI	FW	Bastián Escobar
40	CHI	MF	Franco Cáceres (loan from Universidad de Chile)
42	CHI	MF	Tomás Carrillo
43	CHI	DF	Matías Bordón
–	CHI	MF	Fabrizio Manzo

Manager: Fernando Díaz

=== 2026 Winter Transfers ===
==== In ====
Note: Flags indicate national team as defined under FIFA eligibility rules; some limited exceptions apply. Players may hold more than one non-FIFA nationality.

No.	Pos.	Nation	Player
8	MF	PAR	Fernando Martínez (from Rubio Ñu)
23	DF	CHI	Cristian Riquelme (loan from Colo-Colo)
—	FW	PAR	Diego Acosta (from 2 de Mayo)

No.	Pos.	Nation	Player
—	FW	CHI	Joaquín Montecinos (from Deportes Limache)
—	FW	PAR	Fernando Romero (loan from Independiente Rivadavia)

==== Out ====
Note: Flags indicate national team as defined under FIFA eligibility rules; some limited exceptions apply. Players may hold more than one non-FIFA nationality.

No.	Pos.	Nation	Player
1	GK	BRA	César Dutra (loan to Deportes Limache)
7	FW	ARG	Ángel Gillard (to Corvinul Hunedoara)
10	MF	CHI	Leonardo Valencia (to Deportes Limache)
13	DF	CHI	Cristián Suárez (to Unión San Felipe)
17	FW	CHI	Ignacio Mesías (back to Unión La Calera)

No.	Pos.	Nation	Player
23	DF	CHI	Javier Rojas (back to Colo-Colo)
27	MF	CHI	Nelson Sepúlveda (loan to Deportes Antofagasta)
—	DF	PAR	Jonathan Espínola (to Guaraní)
—	MF	ARG	Mauricio Vera (released)

== Manager ==
- (Argentina) Carlos Orlandelli (1966)
- (Chile) Isaac Carrasco (1967)
- (Chile) Sergio Cruzat (1968)
- (Chile) Luis Vera (1969-1973)
- (Chile) Jaime Ramírez (1973)
- (Argentina) (Chile) Néstor Isella (1974)
- (Chile) Guillermo Báez (1975-1976)
- (Chile) Alfonso Sepúlveda (1976)
- (Chile) Nelson Oyarzún (1977)
- (Chile) Manuel González (1977)
- (Chile) Álex Veloso (1977)
- (Chile) Isaac Carrasco (1978)
- (Chile) Luis Vera (1978-1979)
- (Chile) Pedro García (1980)
- (Chile) Carlos Hoffmann (1981)
- (Chile) Jaime Ramírez (1981)
- (Chile) Hernán Godoy (1982)
- (Chile) Rolando García (1983)
- (Chile) Luis Vera (1984)
- (Chile) Rolando García (1985)
- (Chile) Gustavo Cortés (1986)
- (Chile) Eduardo de la Barra (1987)
- (Chile) Luis Vera (1987)
- (Chile) Eduardo de la Barra (1988)
- (Chile) Gastón Guevara (1988)
- (Argentina) (Chile) Fernando Cavalleri (1989-1990)
- (Chile) Luis Vera (1990)
- (Uruguay) Jorge Luis Siviero (1991)
- (Chile) Eduardo de la Barra (1991)
- (Uruguay) Julio César Antúnez (1992)
- (Chile) Luis Vera (1992)
- (Chile) Sasha Mitjaew (1993)
- (Chile) Luis Vera (1993)
- (Argentina) (Chile) Fernando Cavalleri (1993-1996)
- (Paraguay) Sergio Nichiporuk (1997)
- (Chile) Óscar del Solar (1998-1999)
- (Argentina) Oscar Garré (2000)
- (Paraguay) Sergio Nichiporuk (2001)
- (Argentina) (Chile) Fernando Cavalleri (2001)
- (Chile) Carlos González (2002)
- (Chile) Eduardo Cortázar (2003)
- (Chile) Víctor Merello (2003)
- (Chile) Luis Marcoleta (2004)
- (Chile) Óscar del Solar (2004-2005)
- (Chile) Gustavo Viveros (2005)
- (Chile) Humberto López (2005)
- (Chile) Jaime Nova (2007)
- (Chile) Sergio Herrera (2007)
- (Argentina) (Chile) Fernando Cavalleri (2007)
- (Chile) Jorge Rodríguez (2007)
- (Chile) Jorge Garcés (2008)
- (Paraguay) Antonio Zaracho (2008-2009)
- (Argentina) (Chile) Fernando Cavalleri (2009-2010)
- (Chile) Daniel Salvador (2010)
- (Chile) Óscar del Solar (2010-2011)
- (Paraguay) Antonio Zaracho (2011)
- (Chile) Jorge Garcés (2011)
- (Argentina) Germán Corengia (2012)
- (Argentina) Roberto Mariani (2013)
- (Chile) Víctor Merello (2013)
- (Chile) Patricio Almendra (2013-2014)
- (Paraguay) Antonio Zaracho (2014)
- (Argentina) Fernando Quiroz (2014)
- (Paraguay) Antonio Zaracho (2014)
- (Chile) Juan José Ribera (2014-2015)
- (Paraguay) Antonio Zaracho (2015)
- (Argentina) (Chile) Ariel Pereyra (2015-2016)
- (Paraguay) Antonio Zaracho (2017)
- (Chile) Esteban González (2018-2020)
- (Chile) Christian Muñoz (2020-2021)
- (Chile) Renato Ramos (2021)
- (Chile) Óscar del Solar (2021-2022)
- (Chile) Nicolás Fernández (2022)
- (Chile) César Bustamante (2023)
- (Chile) Claudio Rojas (2023)
- (Chile) Nicolás Fernández (2023)
- (Argentina) Christian Lovrincevich (2023-2024)
- (Chile) Felipe Cornejo (2024)
- (Chile) Manuel Suárez (2024-2025)
- (Chile) Patricio Almendra (2025-2026)
- (Argentina) Walter Lemma (2026)
- (Chile) Alejandro Gutiérrez (2026)
- (Chile) Fernando Díaz (2026-)

== Club records ==
- Seasons in Primera División (I): 33 (1968–81), (1985–93), (1995–02), (2005), (2007–08)
- Seasons in Primera B (II): 12 (1966–67), (1982–84), (1994), (2003–04), (2009–2016), (2025)
- Seasons in Segunda División (III): 5 (2020–2024)
- Seasons in Tercera División (IV): 1 (2019)
- Seasons in Tercera B (V): 1 (2018)
- Copa Libertadores appearances: 2 (1991, 2001)
- Copa CONMEBOL appearances: 1 (1999)
- Largest Margin of Victory: 7–1 vs. Santiago Morning (1976)
- Largest Margin of Defeat: 0–7 vs Universidad de Chile (1987)
- Best Finish in Primera División: 2nd (1975)
- Best Finish in Copa Chile: Runner-up (2010)
- Highest home attendance — 37,423 v. Colo-Colo (1 October 1972)
- Most Goals in Primera División matches: Víctor Estay (77 goals)
- All-time Goalscorer: Víctor Estay (88 goals)
- All-time Appearances: Patricio Almendra (269 games)

== Honours ==
=== National ===
- Copa Francisco Candelori
  - Winners (1): 1970
- Primera B
  - Winners (2): 1967, 1994

=== Regional ===
- Torneo Provincial de Chile
  - Winners (2): 1968, 1970

== Crest ==
1998 to 2017

== South American cups history ==
Season	Competition	Round	Country	Club	Home	Away	Aggregate
1991	Copa Libertadores	First Stage; Group 2	(Chile)	Colo-Colo	0–0	0–2	3rd Place
1991	Copa Libertadores	First Stage; Group 2	(Ecuador)	Barcelona	1–0	2–2	3rd Place
1991	Copa Libertadores	First Stage; Group 2	(Ecuador)	L.D.U. Quito	3–0	0–4	3rd Place
1991	Copa Libertadores	Round of 16	(Colombia)	América de Cali	0–3	3–3	3–6
1999	Copa CONMEBOL	Quarterfinals	(Argentina)	Rosario Central	2–1	2–2	4–3
1999	Copa CONMEBOL	Semifinals	(Argentina)	Talleres de Córdoba	1–1	1–2	2–3
2001	Copa Libertadores	First Stage; Group 3	(Uruguay)	Nacional	0–0	0–2	2nd Place
2001	Copa Libertadores	First Stage; Group 3	(Argentina)	San Lorenzo	3–2	1–2	2nd Place
2001	Copa Libertadores	First Stage; Group 3	(Bolivia)	Jorge Wilstermann	3–0	1–2	2nd Place
2001	Copa Libertadores	Round of 16	(Brazil)	Vasco da Gama	1–3	0–1	1–4
