= Jeyson Rojas =

Chilean footballer (born 2002)

Personal information
- Full name: Jeyson Alejandro Rojas Orellana
- Date of birth: 23 January 2002 (age 24)
- Place of birth: San Javier, Chile
- Height: 1.85 m (6 ft 1 in)
- Position: Defender

Team information
- Current team: Colo-Colo

Youth career
- 2015–2020: Colo-Colo

Senior career*
Years	Team	Apps	(Gls)
2020–	Colo-Colo	61	(0)
2024	→ Unión Española (loan)	9	(1)
2025	→ Deportes La Serena (loan)	25	(0)

International career^{‡}
2021–	Chile	4	(0)
2022–2024	Chile U23	2	(0)
- * Club domestic league appearances and goals as of 7 December 2025 ‡ National team caps and goals as of 27 February 2025

Jeyson Alejandro Rojas Orellana (born 23 January 2002) is a Chilean footballer who plays as a defender for Colo-Colo.

== Club career ==
He came to Colo-Colo in 2015 and made three appearances at the 2020 U-20 Copa Libertadores scoring a goal against Jorge Wilstermann U20. Later, he made his professional debut in a Primera División match against Huachipato on October 3, 2020.

In the second half of 2024, Rojas was loaned out to Unión Española. The next year, he was loaned out ot Deportes La Serena.

== International career ==
Rojas made his debut for the Chile national team on 9 December 2021 in a 2–2 draw against Mexico.

He represented Chile at under-23 level in a 1–0 win against Peru U23 on 31 August 2022, in the context of preparations for the 2023 Pan American Games.

In 2024, he took part in the Pre-Olympic Tournament.
