= Fernando Martínez (Paraguayan footballer) =

Paraguayan footballer

Personal information
- Full name: Fernando Martínez Rojas
- Date of birth: 13 May 1994 (age 32)
- Place of birth: Itauguá, Paraguay
- Height: 1.76 m (5 ft 9 in)
- Position: Midfielder

Team information
- Current team: Deportes Concepción

Youth career
- Olimpia

Senior career*
Years	Team	Apps	(Gls)
2014–2015	Olimpia	14	(0)
2015	→ Deportivo Capiatá (loan)	6	(0)
2016	General Díaz	2	(0)
2016	Sportivo San Lorenzo		
2017	Olimpia Itá		
2017	Deportivo Santaní		
2018	2 de Mayo	26	(0)
2019–2020	Sportivo Luqueño	50	(0)
2021	Nacional Asunción	18	(0)
2022	Resistencia	17	(1)
2022–2023	Sarmiento Junín	39	(0)
2024	General Caballero JLM	37	(0)
2025	Athletic-MG	18	(0)
2025	→ Pouso Alegre (loan)	4	(0)
2026	Rubio Ñu	20	(1)
2026–	Deportes Concepción	0	(0)
- * Club domestic league appearances and goals as of 26 June 2026

Fernando Martínez Rojas (born 13 May 1994) is a Paraguayan professional footballer who plays as a midfielder for Chilean Primera División club Deportes Concepción.

== Career ==
Having started his professional career with Olimpia in 2014 at age of 19, "Chapa" Martínez also played for the teams Deportivo Capiatá, General Díaz, 2 de Mayo, Sportivo Luqueño, Nacional and Resistencia. In 2022, he was announced by Sarmiento de Junín, from Argentine Primera División. He returned to Paraguay in 2024, playing for General Caballero of Juan León Mallorquín.

In 2025, Martínez was signed by Brazilian team Athletic Club, being loaned to another Minas Gerais team Pouso Alegre, where he played in the state league and the first phase of the 2025 Copa do Brasil. In April, the player joined Athletic's squad for the 2025 Campeonato Brasileiro Série B dispute.

In June 2026, Martínez moved to Chile and signed with Deportes Concepción in the top division from Rubio Ñu.
