= Diego Acosta =

Paraguayan footballer (born 2002)

Personal information
- Full name: Diego Emmanuel Acosta Curtido
- Date of birth: 12 November 2002 (age 24)
- Place of birth: Minga Guazú, Paraguay
- Height: 1.75 m (5 ft 9 in)
- Position: Centre-forward

Team information
- Current team: Deportes Concepción
- Number: 27

Youth career
- Libertad
- 2021–2022: Atlético Mineiro

Senior career*
Years	Team	Apps	(Gls)
2022	KAMAZ Naberezhnye Chelny	10	(0)
2022–2023	Orenburg	2	(0)
2023–2024	Sportivo Luqueño	9	(1)
2025–2026	2 de Mayo	45	(11)
2026–	Deportes Concepción	0	(0)

International career^{‡}
2018	Paraguay U16	3	(0)
2019	Paraguay U17	9	(0)
2019	Paraguay U18	2	(1)
- * Club domestic league appearances and goals as of 13 August 2025 ‡ National team caps and goals as of 10 November 2019

Diego Emmanuel Acosta Curtido, known as Diego Acosta (born 12 November 2002) is a Paraguayan professional footballer who plays as a centre-forward for Chilean club Deportes Concepción.

== Club career ==
After making his senior professional debut earlier in 2022 in the Russian second tier with FC KAMAZ Naberezhnye Chelny, on 10 July 2022 Acosta signed with Russian Premier League club FC Orenburg. He made his RPL debut for Orenburg on 28 August 2022 in a game against FC Lokomotiv Moscow.

In July 2026, Acosta moved to Chile and signed with Deportes Concepción from 2 de Mayo.

== International career ==
Acosta represented Paraguay at the 2019 FIFA U-17 World Cup, where they reached the quarter-finals.

== Career statistics ==
As of 27 November 2022

Appearances and goals by club, season and competition
Club	Season	League			Cup		Continental		Total	
Club	Season	Division	Apps	Goals	Apps	Goals	Apps	Goals	Apps	Goals
KAMAZ	2021–22	Russian First League	10	0	1	0	–		11	0
Orenburg	2022–23	RPL	2	0	4	0	–		6	0
Career total			12	0	5	0	0	0	17	0
