= Juan Figueroa (Argentine footballer) =

Argentine footballer

Personal information
- Full name: Juan Eduardo Figueroa
- Date of birth: 14 July 1992 (age 34)
- Place of birth: Martín Coronado, Argentina
- Height: 1.76 m (5 ft 9 in)
- Position: Goalkeeper

Team information
- Current team: Defensores Unidos

Youth career
- San Lorenzo

Senior career*
Years	Team	Apps	(Gls)
2011–2013	San Lorenzo	0	(0)
2013–2014	Defensa y Justicia	0	(0)
2015–	Defensores Unidos	157	(0)
- * Club domestic league appearances and goals as of 13:18, 14 May 2019 (UTC)

Juan Eduardo Figueroa (born 14 July 1992) is an Argentine professional footballer who plays as a goalkeeper for Defensores Unidos.

== Career ==
Figueroa started with San Lorenzo. He didn't appear competitively for the club, though was an unused substitute four times in all competitions in November/December 2011. Figueroa departed on 20 July 2013, subsequently signing for Primera B Nacional side Defensa y Justicia. He remained for the 2013–14 campaign as they won promotion, though the goalkeeper again didn't feature. Figueroa switched Defensa y Justicia for Defensores Unidos in January 2015. One hundred and twenty-five appearances occurred in Primera C Metropolitana across four campaigns, which culminated with them being promoted to the third tier.

== Career statistics ==
As of 14 May 2019.

Appearances and goals by club, season and competition
Club	Season	League			Cup		League Cup		Continental		Other		Total	
Club	Season	Division	Apps	Goals	Apps	Goals	Apps	Goals	Apps	Goals	Apps	Goals	Apps	Goals
San Lorenzo	2011–12	Primera División	0	0	0	0	—		—		0	0	0	0
San Lorenzo	2012–13	Primera División	0	0	0	0	—		—		0	0	0	0
San Lorenzo	Total		0	0	0	0	—		—		0	0	0	0
Defensa y Justicia	2013–14	Primera B Nacional	0	0	0	0	—		—		0	0	0	0
Defensa y Justicia	2014	Primera División	0	0	0	0	—		—		0	0	0	0
Defensa y Justicia	Total		0	0	0	0	—		—		0	0	0	0
Defensores Unidos	2018–19	Primera B Metropolitana	32	0	2	0	—		—		0	0	34	0
Career total			32	0	2	0	—		—		0	0	34	0

== Honours ==
Defensores Unidos

- Primera C Metropolitana: 2017–18
