= Harol Salgado =

Chilean footballer (born 2000)

Personal information
- Full name: Harol Anderson Enrique Salgado Oñate
- Date of birth: 4 September 2000 (age 26)
- Place of birth: Talcahuano, Chile
- Height: 1.70 m (5 ft 7 in)
- Position: Winger

Team information
- Current team: Universidad de Concepción
- Number: 25

Youth career
- Juventud Letelier
- Juventud Porteña
- Unión Española

Senior career*
Years	Team	Apps	(Gls)
2019	Comunal Cabrero	–	(–)
2020–2021	Fernández Vial	17	(2)
2021–2023	Coquimbo Unido	26	(5)
2022	→ Fernández Vial (loan)	15	(3)
2023	→ Santiago Morning (loan)	15	(0)
2024	Barnechea	26	(11)
2025	Deportes Limache	5	(0)
2025–	Universidad de Concepción	12	(0)
- * Club domestic league appearances and goals as of 15 February 2026

Harol Anderson Enrique Salgado Oñate (born 4 September 2000) is a Chilean footballer who plays as a winger for Chilean Primera División club Universidad de Concepción.

== Club career ==
Born in Talcahuano, Chile, Salgado was with the local clubs Juventud Letelier and Juventud Porteña before joining for a brief stint to the Unión Española youth ranks. Later, he started his senior career with Comunal Cabrero in the Tercera B. He switched to Fernández Vial in 2020 thanks to Patricio Almendra, winning the Segunda División Profesional.

In 2021, Salgado signed with Coquimbo Unido, winning the 2021 Primera B de Chile. He continued with them in the 2022 Chilean Primera División and was loaned out to Fernández Vial in June of the same year. The next season, he switched to Santiago Morning.

After a successful stint with Barnechea during 2024, Salgado joined Deportes Limache in the 2025 Liga de Primera. He moved to Universidad de Concepción in July of the same year, winning the 2025 Liga de Ascenso.
