= Joaquín Pereyra (Uruguayan football midfielder) =

Uruguayan footballer

Personal information
- Full name: Joaquín Mauricio Pereyra Faggiano
- Date of birth: 5 September 1994 (age 32)
- Place of birth: Montevideo, Uruguay
- Height: 1.74 m (5 ft 9 in)
- Position: Midfielder

Team information
- Current team: Deportes Iquique

Youth career
- Atlético Florida
- Liverpool Montevideo

Senior career*
Years	Team	Apps	(Gls)
2015–2016	Miramar Misiones	32	(0)
2017–2021	Sud América	110	(3)
2021–2025	Santiago Wanderers	125	(5)
2026–	Deportes Iquique	0	(0)
- * Club domestic league appearances and goals as of 5 December 2025

Joaquín Mauricio Pereyra Faggiano (born 5 September 1994) is a Uruguayan footballer who plays as a midfielder for Chilean club Deportes Iquique.

== Club career ==
As a youth player, Pereyra was with Atlético Florida and Liverpool Montevideo. He began his professional career with Miramar Misiones and switched to Sud América in the Uruguayan Primera División in 2017. After Sud América was relegated to the second level, Pereyra was a member of the squad that returned to the top level in the 2020 season.

In the second half of 2021, Pereyra moved abroad and signed with Santiago Wanderers in the Chilean Primera División. He renewed his contract for the 2024 season and left them at the end of the 2025 season.

In December 2025, Pereyra joined Deportes Iquique.
