= Diego González (footballer, born 1997) =

Uruguayan footballer

Personal information
- Full name: Diego Alexis González Miranda
- Date of birth: 21 February 1997 (age 29)
- Place of birth: Paso de los Toros, Uruguay
- Height: 1.77 m (5 ft 10 in)
- Position: Forward

Team information
- Current team: San Luis

Youth career
- 2010–2012: Defensor Sporting
- 2012–2013: Ferrocarril Tacuarembó
- 2013–2015: Defensor Sporting
- 2015: Juventud Las Piedras

Senior career*
Years	Team	Apps	(Gls)
2015–2019	Juventud Las Piedras	27	(3)
2019	Cerrito	10	(1)
2020	Tacuarembó	18	(5)
2021	Atenas	1	(0)
2021	→ Rocha (loan)	6	(0)
2022	Villa Española	16	(4)
2022	Rampla Juniors	15	(7)
2023	Almagro	8	(0)
2023	La Luz FC	15	(2)
2024	Deportes Santa Cruz	29	(9)
2025	Unión San Felipe	26	(4)
2026–	San Luis	0	(0)
- * Club domestic league appearances and goals as of 25 December 2025

Diego Alexis González Miranda (born 21 February 1997) is a Uruguayan footballer who plays as a forward for Chilean club San Luis de Quillota.

== Career ==
Born in Paso de los Toros, Uruguay, González started his career with Juventud de Las Piedras and made his senior debut at the age of 18. He stayed with them until 2019.

From 2019 to 2022, González played in his homeland for Cerrito, Tacuarembó, Atenas de San Carlos, Rocha, Villa Española and Rampla Juniors.

In 2023, González moved to Argentina and joined Almagro. In the second half of the same year, he returned to Uruguay to play for La Luz FC.

In 2024, González moved abroad again and signed with Chilean club Deportes Santa Cruz. The next season, he switched to Unión San Felipe.

González joined San Luis de Quillota for the 2026 season.
