= Gonzalo Jara (footballer, born 1998) =

Chilean footballer

Personal information
- Full name: Gonzalo Andrés Jara González
- Date of birth: 1 December 1998 (age 27)
- Place of birth: Las Condes, Santiago, Chile
- Height: 1.71 m (5 ft 7 in)
- Position: Right midfielder

Team information
- Current team: Unión San Felipe
- Number: 10

Youth career
- Universidad Católica

Senior career*
Years	Team	Apps	(Gls)
2017–2019	Universidad Católica	0	(0)
2017	→ Barnechea (loan)	14	(0)
2018	→ Unión La Calera (loan)	2	(0)
2018	→ Barnechea (loan)	14	(1)
2019	→ Magallanes (loan)	10	(0)
2019	AD Oliveirense	7	(0)
2020	Progreso	20	(2)
2021–2022	Mushuc Runa	26	(1)
2022	Progreso	18	(1)
2023–	Unión San Felipe	61	(14)
2025	→ Deportes La Serena (loan)	28	(3)

International career
2015	Chile U17	4	(1)
- * Club domestic league appearances and goals as of 31 December 2025

Gonzalo Andrés Jara González (born 1 December 1998) is a Chilean professional footballer who plays as midfielder for Unión San Felipe.

== Club career ==
After playing loaned to several clubs and having no chances to play for his native club, Universidad Católica, on second half 2019 Jara joined LigaPro club Oliveirense as a free agent, taking up his first international experience.

On 2020 season, he joined Uruguayan club Progreso. In 2021, he moved to Ecuador and joined Mushuc Runa.

In 2023, Jara returned to Chile and joined Unión San Felipe. He was loaned out to Deportes La Serena for the 2025 season.

== International career ==
Jara represented Chile U17 at the 2015 FIFA U17 World Cup, making appearances in all four matches played by Chile and scoring a goal.

== Career statistics ==
=== Club ===
As of 18 January 2021

Appearances and goals by club, season and competition
Club	Season	League			Cup		Continental		Other		Total	
Club	Season	Division	Apps	Goals	Apps	Goals	Apps	Goals	Apps	Goals	Apps	Goals
Barnechea (loan)	2017–T	Primera B	14	0	0	0	—		0	0	14	0
Barnechea (loan)	2018	Primera B	14	1	0	0	—		0	0	14	1
Barnechea (loan)	Total		28	1	0	0	—		0	0	28	1
Unión La Calera (loan)	2018	Chilean Primera División	2	0	3 (Note: Appearances in the Copa Chile)	1	—		0	0	5	1
Magallanes (loan)	2019	Primera B	10	0	1	0	—		0	0	11	0
Oliveirense	2019–20	LigaPro	7	0	0	0	—		0	0	7	0
Progreso	2020	Uruguayan Primera División	20	2	0	0	—		0	0	20	2
Mushuc Runa	2021	Ecuadorian Serie A	0	0	0	0	—		0	0	0	0
Career total			67	3	4	1	—		0	0	71	4
