= Luis Vera (Chilean footballer) =

Chilean footballer (1929-2014)

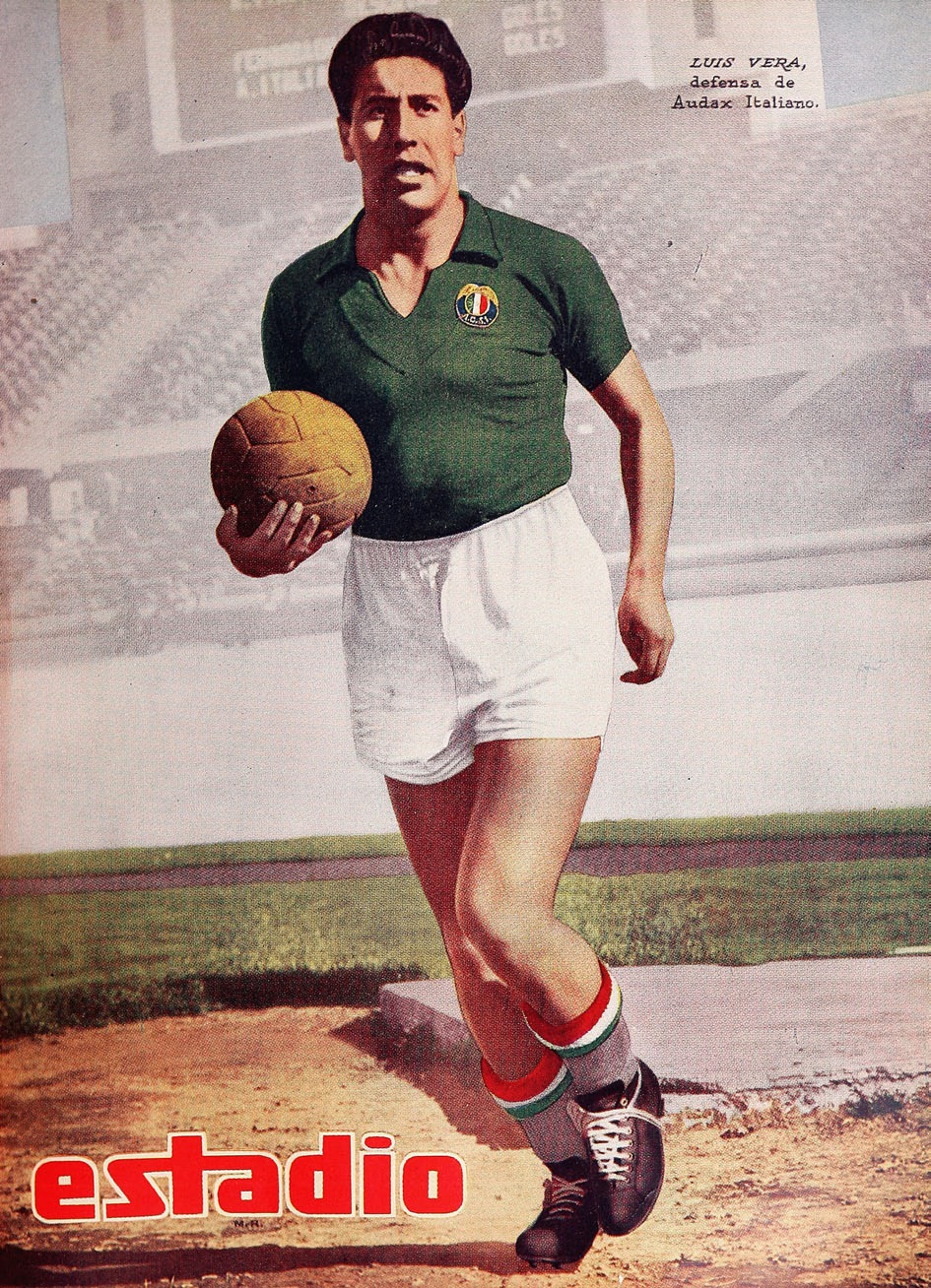
- 1952

Personal information
- Full name: Luis Alberto Vera Avendaño
- Date of birth: 22 December 1929
- Date of death: 28 June 2014 (aged 84)
- Position: Defender

International career
Years	Team	Apps	(Gls)
1954–1959	Chile	14	(0)

Luis Vera (22 December 1929 – 28 June 2014) was a Chilean footballer. He played in 14 matches for the Chile national football team from 1954 to 1959. He was also part of Chile's squad for the 1959 South American Championship that took place in Argentina.
