= Eduardo de la Barra (footballer) =

Chilean footballer and manager (1959–2025)

Personal information
- Full name: Eduardo Federico de la Barra Tobar
- Date of birth: 9 November 1959
- Place of birth: Chile
- Date of death: 23 January 2025 (aged 65)
- Position: Defender

Senior career*
Years	Team	Apps	(Gls)
–1972	Ñublense		
1973–1975	Green Cross-Temuco	47	(5)
1976	Avaí		
1977–1980	Deportes Concepción	102	(9)
1981–1982	Naval	59	(2)
1983	Fernández Vial	8	(0)
1984–1985	Deportes Concepción	40	(0)

Managerial career
- 1987: Deportes Concepción
- 1988: Deportes Concepción
- 1989: Naval
- 1990: Naval (assistant)
- 1990: Naval (caretaker)
- 1991: Los Naúticos
- 1991: Deportes Concepción
- 1992: Everton
- 1993: Deportes Talcahuano
- 1994: Ñublense
- 1995: Everton
- 1996–2009: Universidad de Concepción (youth)
- 2010: Fernández Vial
- 2010–2017: Universidad de Concepción (youth)
- 2017–2021: Universidad de Concepción (women)
- * Club domestic league appearances and goals

Eduardo Federico de la Barra Tobar (9 November 1959 – 23 January 2025) was a Chilean football player and manager who played as a defender for clubs in Chile and Brazil.

== Playing career ==
A defender, de la Barra played for clubs from the South zone in his country of birth. He made his debut with Ñublense in the Chilean second level. He played at the Chilean top division for Green Cross-Temuco (1973–75), Deportes Concepción (1977–1980, 1985), Naval (1981–82) and Fernández Vial (1983).

Abroad, he played for Brazilian Série A side Avaí in 1976.

A historical player of Deportes Concepción, he also played for them in the 1984 Segunda División, earning the promotion to the top division after becoming the runner-up.

== Coaching career ==
As a football coach, he has stated that his favourite formation is 4–4–2.

As a head coach, de la Barra had mainly led clubs from the South zone of Chile. In the top division, he coached Deportes Concepción three times, Naval, also being the assistant of Luis Ibarra in the first half of 1990, and Everton de Viña del Mar twice.

In the second level, he coached Ñublense in 1994.

In the Tercera A, he coached Fernández Vial in 2010.

At youth level, he worked in the Universidad de Concepción youth ranks from 1996 to 2017 and subsequently he became coach of the women's team from 2017 to 2021.

== Personal life and death ==
De la Barra was born on 9 November 1959. He was diagnosed with kidney cancer in 2023, and died from the disease on 23 January 2025, at the age of 65.
