= Felipe Fritz =

Chilean footballer (born 1997)

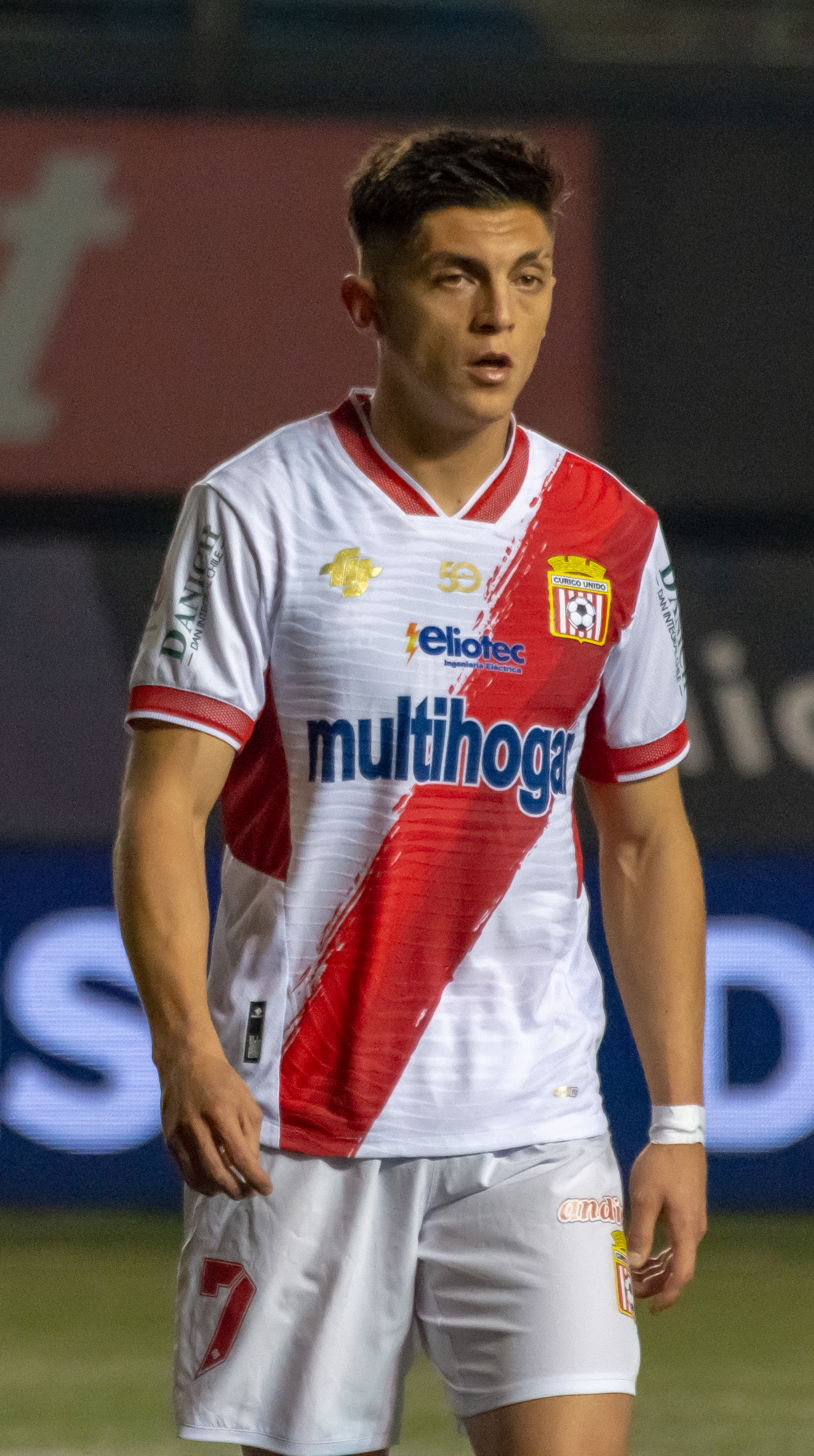
- Fritz with Curicó Unido in 2023

Personal information
- Full name: Felipe Luciano Fritz Saldías
- Date of birth: 23 September 1997 (age 29)
- Place of birth: Coronel, Chile
- Height: 1.75 m (5 ft 9 in)
- Position: Left wing-back

Team information
- Current team: Cobreloa

Youth career
- Universidad de Concepción

Senior career*
| Years | Team | Apps | (Gls) |
| 2015–2019 | Universidad de Concepción | 32 | (3) |
| 2018 | → Cobreloa (loan) | 7 | (1) |
| 2019 | → Rangers (loan) | 20 | (1) |
| 2020 | Unión Española | 28 | (3) |
| 2021 | Colo-Colo | 1 | (0) |
| 2021 | → Curicó Unido (loan) | 16 | (4) |
| 2022–2023 | Curicó Unido | 51 | (2) |
| 2024–2025 | Deportes Limache | 51 | (4) |
| 2026– | Cobreloa | 0 | (0) |

International career^{‡}
| 2017 | Chile U20 | 0 | (0) |
- * Club domestic league appearances and goals as of 3 January 2026 ‡ National team caps and goals as of 20 May 2017

Felipe Luciano Fritz Saldías (born 23 September 1997) is a Chilean football player who plays as a left wing-back for Cobreloa.

== Club career ==
In 2021, Fritz joined Chilean Primera División club Colo-Colo from Unión Española, but he was loaned to Curicó Unido in July of the same year.

In 2024, Fritz joined Deportes Limache in the Primera B de Chile. He left them at the end of 2025.

On 4 January 2026, Fritz joined Cobreloa.

== International career ==
He was in the Chile U20 squad for the 2017 South American U-20 Championship, but he didn't make any appearance.

== Honours ==
Cobreloa

- Primera B de Chile: 2026
