= Nelson Da Silva (Argentine footballer) =

Argentine footballer (born 1996)

Personal information
- Full name: Nelson Matías Da Silva
- Date of birth: 25 August 1996 (age 30)
- Place of birth: Andalgalá, Catamarca, Argentina
- Height: 1.87 m (6 ft 2 in)
- Position: Striker

Team information
- Current team: Palestino

Youth career
- Tiro Federal Andalgalá

Senior career*
Years	Team	Apps	(Gls)
2014	Villa Cubas	–	(–)
2015	Tiro Federal Andalgalá	–	(–)
2015	Unión Aconquija	0	(0)
2015	Defensores de Esquiú	–	(–)
2016	Villa Cubas	10	(4)
2016–2018	All Boys	6	(0)
2019	Villa Cubas	–	(–)
2019–2020	Inter Playa del Carmen	5	(0)
2020	Villa Cubas	–	(–)
2020–2021	Juventud Antoniana	6	(4)
2021	Peñarol Chimbas	21	(7)
2022	Olimpo	31	(6)
2023	Resistencia	30	(2)
2024–2025	Deportes Limache	48	(20)
2026–	Palestino	0	(0)
- * Club domestic league appearances and goals as of 6 January 2026

Nelson Matías Da Silva (born 25 August 1996) is an Argentine footballer who plays as a striker for Chilean Primera División club Palestino.

== Club career ==
Born in Andalgalá, Argentina, Da Silva is a product of Club Tiro Federal y Gimnasia from his hometown. In August 2014, he joined Villa Cubas in the Torneo Provincial Catamarca.

During 2015, he played for Tiro Federal y Gimnasia Andalgalá, Unión Aconquija and Defensores de Esquiú.

In 2016, Da Silva rejoined Villa Cubas in the Torneo Federal B before signing with All Boys in the Primera Nacional. He also made appearances for the reserve team.

In April 2019, Da Silva signed with Villa Cubas for a third time after a trial with a club in Paraguay. In July of the same year, he had a trial with Nueva Chicago. In December, he emigrated to Mexico and joined Inter Playa del Carmen.

The next year, he returned to Villa Cubas before signing with Juventud Antoniana in October 2020. In February 2021, he switched to Peñarol de Chimbas.

In 2022, Da Silva played for Olimpo.

In 2023, he moved to Paraguay for a second time and signed with Resistencia in the top division. He ended the season with them despite receiving threats after the Olimpia goalkeeper, Gastón Olveira, got injured as a result of a crash with him on 15 July.

In 2024, Da Silva moved to Chile and signed with Deportes Limache.

On 6 January 2026, Da Silva signed with Palestino.
