= Huachipato FC =

Chilean football club

Huachipato
- Full name: Club Deportivo Huachipato
- Nicknames: Los Acereros (Steelers); Campeón del Sur (Champion of the South); Los de la usina (Steelmillers); Siderúrgicos (Steelworkers); Negriazules (Black and blues)
- Founded: 7 June 1947; 79 years ago
- Ground: Estadio Huachipato-CAP Acero, Talcahuano
- Capacity: 10,500
- Chairman: Hernán Rosenblum
- Manager: Jaime García
- League: Liga de Primera
- 2025: Liga de Primera, 9th of 16
- Website: www.huachipatofc.cl
Home colours	Away colours

Huachipato FC is a Chilean football club based in Talcahuano that currently plays in the Chilean Primera División. Huachipato was founded on 7 June 1947 by workers of the homonymous steel mill in Talcahuano, and it currently plays its home games at the Estadio Huachipato-CAP Acero which it owns, being one of only five Chilean professional football clubs to own their own ground.

Huachipato have been Chilean champions three times and it is the only team from Southern Chile to ever win the Chilean top flight title. Huachipato is known in Chile from its academy and youth talent production that makes up the bulk of their squad, qualifying for the U-20 Copa Libertadores twice, both times as reigning youth Chilean champions.

== History ==
In 1947, CD Huachipato was officially notarized, and the first official recorded game was played. The original fans were the local company employees of the steel industry in Huachipato. It took a few years for the club to achieve its first successes, obtaining regional championships in 1956 and 1964.

In its early seasons, "the Steelers" (Acereros), as they are known, were quite satisfactory in the second division. The 1965 debut was against Municipal de Santiago with a 3–0 victory.

After 36 games the standings would show Huachipato second with 46 points, 3 points less than that of Ferrobádminton another second-division team that took the championship and thus passage (which is how it was granted in those years) to the First Division.

However, a year later (1966), the Steelers managed promotion to the first division, after winning the second division champions Chile with 49 points, they remained well above teams like Coquimbo (42 points) and San Antonio (39) who stayed with the second and third place respectively after thirty games.

With only two years in the professionalism of Talcahuano, Huachipato was installed in the top-flight professional football in Chile, La Primera División.

With a tie on a goal, as local and against Audax Italiano, the "Steelers" debuted in the first division. In the first season of the first division, Huachipato had an acceptable term in sixth place among 18 teams, although the tournament was on two wheels. The following years were quiet for steel, culminating their shares in the mid-high zone of the standings. However, a few years after this change, Huachipato won the 1974 First Division Football Championship, with this triumph they are the only Chilean Football team from the south of Chile to obtain the title.

1974 was a year that many Huachipato fans will never forget, after 34 matches played, Huachipato had to beat Aviación to become champions in their last match, and they did it, Moisés Silva scored the only goal that crowned Huchipato champions that year.

From the end of the 1990s, Huachipato was characterized by a club trainer of players from lower divisions. Examples of these are important values steelmakers who emerged from the quarry as Roberto Cartes, Cristian Uribe, Rodrigo Rain, Cristián Reynero, Rodrigo Millar, Mario Salgado, Héctor Mancilla, Gonzalo Jara, Pedro Morales, Mauricio Arias, among others.

As for sporting achievements, Huachipato reached the Semi-Finals in the Torneos Apertura in the years 2003, 2004, 2005 and 2006. In addition, since the end of the 1990s, the Huachipato classification achieved an international tournament and the Copa Sudamericana 2006 and their second championship in 38 years, after defeating Unión Española in the 2012 Chilean Clausura Tournament final.

Huachipato were crowned champions of the 2023 Chilean Primera División by 1 point, and in dramatic fashion. They triumphed 2-0 against Audax Italiano at home on the final day of matches, to increase their point tally to 57, while Cobresal, who had 56 points, failed to gain any points during the same day, suffering a 1-0 away loss to Unión Española. This gave Huachipato its third overall league title, and first since 2012.

As a result of their triumph of Chile's top flight in 2023, they participated in the 2024 Copa Libertadores.

== Team colours and symbols ==
From its foundation in 1947 and until 1966, Huachipato wore a red shirt, blue pants and white socks uniform in the same vein as the Chile national football team. Upon Huachipato's first promotion to the top flight in 1967, the team switched to its current black and blue uniform, inspired by Inter Milan's colours.

Huachipato's name is derived from the Mapudungun eponomyous term that coined the area where the team is located, with the term meaning "Bird-catching trap".

Huachipato's badge was inspired by the Steelmark logo owned by the American Iron and Steel Institute, bearing a similarity to the NFL's Pittsburgh Steelers logo, given both teams' steelmaking roots.

== Club data ==
- Seasons in Primera División: 50 (1967-1978, 1983–1990, 1992, 1995-)
- Seasons in Primera B: 9 (1965-1966, 1979–1982, 1991, 1993–1994)
- Copa Chile appearances: 33 (1974-1975-1977-1984-1985-1986-1987-1988-1989-1990-1991-1992-1993-1994-1995-1996-1998-2000-2008-2009-2010-2011-2012-2013-2014-2015-2016-2017-2018-2019-2021-2022-2023)
- Copa Libertadores appearances: 3 (1975, 2013, 2024)
- Copa Sudamericana appearances: 6 (2006, 2014, 2015, 2020, 2021, 2024)

== Honours ==
=== National ===
- Primera División
  - Winners (3): 1974, 2012-C, 2023
- Copa Chile
  - Winners (1): 2025
- Segunda División
  - Winners (1): 1966

=== Regional ===
- Asociación de Fútbol de Talcahuano
  - Winners (1): 1950
- Campeonato Regional de Fútbol
  - Winners (2): 1956, 1964

=== Women's team ===
- Primera B
  - Champions (1): 2021

== South American cups history ==
Season	Competition	Round	Country	Club	Home	Away	Aggregate
1975	Copa Libertadores	Group 2	(Chile)	Unión Española	0–0	2–7	2nd Place
1975	Copa Libertadores	Group 2	(Bolivia)	The Strongest	4–2	0–1	2nd Place
1975	Copa Libertadores	Group 2	(Bolivia)	Jorge Wilstermann	4–0	0–0	2nd Place
2006	Copa Sudamericana	First Round	(Chile)	Colo-Colo	1–2	2–1	3–3 3-5p
2013	Copa Libertadores	Group 8	(Brazil)	Fluminense	1–3	1–1	3rd Place
2013	Copa Libertadores	Group 8	(Brazil)	Grêmio	1–1	2–1	3rd Place
2013	Copa Libertadores	Group 8	(Venezuela)	Caracas	1–2	4–0	3rd Place
2014	Copa Sudamericana	First Round	(Bolivia)	San José	3–1	3–2	6–3
2014	Copa Sudamericana	Second Round	(Ecuador)	Universidad Católica	2–0	0–1	2–1
2014	Copa Sudamericana	Round of 16	(Brazil)	São Paulo	2–3	0–1	2–4
2015	Copa Sudamericana	First Round	(Paraguay)	Olimpia	0–2	0–2	0–4
2020	Copa Sudamericana	First Round	(Colombia)	Pasto	1–0	1–0	2–0
2020	Copa Sudamericana	Second Round	(Uruguay)	Fénix	1–1	1–3	2–4
2021	Copa Sudamericana						
2021	Copa Sudamericana	First Round	(Chile)	Antofagasta	3–0	1–0	4–0
2021	Copa Sudamericana	Group A	(Argentina)	San Lorenzo	0–3	1–0	2nd Place
2021	Copa Sudamericana	Group A	(Argentina)	Rosario Central	1–1	0–5	2nd Place
2021	Copa Sudamericana	Group A	(Paraguay)	12 de Octubre	0-0	2-1	2nd Place
2024	Copa Libertadores	Group C	(Argentina)	Estudiantes	1–1	4–3	3rd Place
2024	Copa Libertadores	Group C	(Bolivia)	The Strongest	0–0	0–4	3rd Place
2024	Copa Libertadores	Group C	(Brazil)	Grêmio	0-1	2-0	3rd Place
2024	Copa Sudamericana	Knockout round play-offs	(Uruguay)	Racing (URU)	2–3	1–0	3–3 3-0p
2024	Copa Sudamericana	Round of 16	(Argentina)	Racing (ARG)	0–2	1–6	1–8

== Club records ==
- Record Primera División victory — 6–0 v. Aviación (1975) and La Calera (2014)
- Record Primera División defeat — 0–7 v. Palestino (1978)
- Record Copa Chile victory — 12–0 v. Presidente Ibáñez de Punta Arenas (2024)
- Record Copa Chile defeat — 0–4 v. Osorno (1989) and Unión Española (1990)
- Record Copa Libertadores victory — 4–0 v. Caracas (2013)
- Record Copa Libertadores defeat — 2–7 v. Unión Española (1974)
- Record Copa Sudamericana victory — 3–0 v. Antofagasta (2021)
- Record Copa Sudamericana defeat — 0–5 v. Rosario Central (2021)
- Record Top Scorer — 72 goals, Héctor Mancilla (2000–2005, 2015)
- Most Appearances — 335 matches, Claudio Sepúlveda (2015–)
- Highest home attendance — 43,340 v. Colo-Colo (12 November 1967, at Estadio Regional de Concepción)
- Primera División Best Result — Champions (1974, 2012 C)
- Copa Chile Best Result — Champions (2025)

== Other sports ==
Up until 2015, Huachipato was a multisports club, maintaining basketball, karate, taekwondo, artistic roller skating, roller hockey, tennis, table tennis, volleyball, and futsal branches.

== Supporters and rivalries ==
Huachipato's supporters, nicknamed the Acereros, largely come from its home city of Talcahuano, with groups of fans coming from cities belonging to the Greater Concepción conurbation. A smaller group of fans reside in Santiago, often attending away games.

Huachipato's main rivals are Naval, who are also based in Talcahuano and with whom Huachipato contest the Clásico Chorero, and Deportes Concepción, from the neighbouring city and regional capital, with whom Huachipato contest the Clasico del Gran Concepción.

Huachipato and O'Higgins F.C. have a longstanding mutual friendship, originating from the Tomé tragedy of 2013, where 16 travelling O'Higgins fans tragically lost their lives in a road accident in Tomé, while returning from Estadio CAP after a 2-0 O'Higgins victory. In every fixture played between both teams since, both clubs organize a memorial ceremony previous to each match. Huachipato installed a permanent commemorative plaque at Estadio CAP in 2018, in remembrance of the tragedy, and since 2022, both clubs symbolically contest the Copa 16 (Trophy of the 16), in honour of the departed fans.

== Players ==
=== Current squad ===
Current squad of Huachipato FC as of 19 August 2026 (edit)
Sources: ANFP Official Web Site

No.		Position	Player
1	CHI	GK	Sebastián Mella
2	CHI	DF	Guillermo Guaiquil
3	CHI	DF	Benjamín Mellado
4	CHI	DF	José Castro (loan from Universidad de Chile)
5	CHI	MF	Rafael Caroca
6	CHI	MF	Claudio Sepúlveda (c)
7	CHI	FW	Mario Briceño
9	ARG	FW	Lionel Altamirano
10	ARG	MF	Ezequiel Cañete
11	CHI	FW	Juan Figueroa
12	CHI	GK	Christian Bravo
14	CHI	DF	Nicolás Vargas
15	CHI	FW	Maximiliano Rodríguez
16	CHI	FW	Luciano Arriagada
18	CHI	MF	Benjamín Ampuero
20	CHI	DF	Cristian Toro
21	CHI	MF	Carlos Herrera

No.		Position	Player
22	CHI	MF	Nicolás Cárcamo
23	PAR	FW	Cris Martínez
24	CHI	MF	Maicol León
25	URU	GK	Rodrigo Odriozola
26	CHI	FW	Harold Antiñirre
27	CHI	DF	Lucas Velásquez
29	CHI	MF	Claudio Torres
30	URU	MF	Kevin Altez (loan from Defensor Sporting)
33	CHI	FW	Álvaro Abarzúa
36	CHI	DF	Ezequiel Osorio
38	CHI	DF	Sebastián Melgarejo
42	CHI	FW	Pablo Bohle
49	CHI	GK	Ignacio Cruzat
51	CHI	MF	Martín Torrejón
52	COL	FW	David Larrahondo
53	COL	FW	Freddy Alegría
–	URU	FW	Sergio Núñez (loan from Liverpool Montevideo)

Manager: Jaime García

=== 2026 Winter Transfers ===
==== In ====
Note: Flags indicate national team as defined under FIFA eligibility rules; some limited exceptions apply. Players may hold more than one non-FIFA nationality.

No.	Pos.	Nation	Player
—	FW	URU	Sergio Núñez (loan from Liverpool Montevideo)

==== Out ====
Note: Flags indicate national team as defined under FIFA eligibility rules; some limited exceptions apply. Players may hold more than one non-FIFA nationality.

No. / Pos. / Nation / Player; 8 / MF / URU / Santiago Silva (loan to Nacional)	No. / Pos. / Nation / Player; 13 / DF / ARG / Renzo Malanca (to Banfield)

== Managers ==
In Italics, the caretaker managers of Huachipato. In bold, the managers who won a title with Huachipato.

- (Chile) Arturo Gutiérrez (1949-1950)
- (Chile) Gastón Osbén (1950)
- (Chile) Arturo Gutiérrez (1950-1951)
- (Argentina) Teodoro Contreras (1951)
- (Chile) Félix Caballero (1952-1953)
- (Chile) Nestór Madariaga (1954-1955)
- (Chile) Sergio Cruzat (1956-1959)
- (Chile) Nestór Madariaga (1959-1960)
- (Argentina) José Luis Boffi (1961)
- (Chile) Amadeo Silva (1962)
- (Chile) Luis Vera (1963-1968)
- (Chile) Andrés Prieto (1969–70)
- (Chile) Caupolicán Peña (1971)
- (Chile) **Pedro Morales** (1972-1975)
- (Argentina) Miguel Ángel Ruiz (1975)
- (Chile) Armando Tobar (1975)
- (Argentina) Salvador Biondi (1976)
- (Chile) Alberto Fouilloux (1977–78)
- (Chile) Armando Tobar (1978)
- (Chile) Luis Vera (1979-1982)
- (Chile) Francisco Hormazábal (1983-1984)
- (Chile) Luis Ibarra (1984)
- (Chile) Luis Santibañez (1985)
- (Chile) Luis Vera (1985)
- (Chile) Antonio Vargas (1985–86)
- (Chile) Luis Vera (1986–87)
- (Chile) Nelson Gatica (1987)
- (Chile) Manfredo González (1987–89)
- (Chile) Juan Carlos Gangas (1990)
- (Chile) Germán Cornejo (1991)
- (Uruguay) Manuel Keosseián (1992)
- (Chile) Carlos Felipe Pedemonte (1992)
- (Chile) Rolando García (1992-1995)
- (Croatia) Andrija Perčić (1995-1999)
- (Chile) Carlos Felipe Pedemonte (2000)
- (Chile) Yuri Fernández (2000)
- (Argentina) Jorge Solari (2000)
- (Argentina) Oscar Garré (2001-2003)
- (Chile) Arturo Salah (2004-2007)
- (Paraguay) Antonio Zaracho (2007–08)
- (Chile) Carlos Felipe Pedemonte (2008)
- (Chile) Fernando Vergara (2008-2009)
- (Chile) Pedro García (2009)
- (Chile) Arturo Salah (2009-2011)
- (Chile) Alejandro Padilla (2011)
- (Chile) **Jorge Pellicer** (2011-2013)
- (Chile) Mario Salas (2013–2014)
- (Chile) Hugo Vilches (2015)
- (Chile) Miguel Ponce (2016-2017)
- (Argentina) César Vigevani (2017)
- (Argentina) Nicolás Larcamón (2018-2019)
- (Paraguay) Gustavo Florentín (2019-2021)
- (Argentina) Juan José Luvera (2021)
- (Chile) Mario Salas (2021–2022)
- (Argentina) **Gustavo Álvarez** (2023)
- (Argentina) Javier Sanguinetti (2024)
- (Chile) Francisco Troncoso (2024)
- (Spain) Igor Oca (2024)
- (Chile) **Jaime García** (2025-)
