= Cheema =

Cheema may refer to:

== People ==
- Cheema (surname) (including a list of people with the name)

== Places ==
=== India ===
- Jammu and Kashmir
  - Cheema, Kashmir, a border village on LOC covered under the Vibrant Village Programme in one of the districts of Kupwara, Baramulla and Bandipore
- Punjab, India
  - Cheema, Sangrur, a town in Sangrur district
  - Cheema, Dhuri, a village in Dhuri, Sangrur district
  - Cheema, Gurdaspur, a village in Gurdaspur district
  - Cheema, Barnala, a village in Barnala district

=== Pakistan ===
- Punjab, Pakistan
  - Gujranwala District
    - Banka Cheema
    - Dilawar Cheema
    - Wadala Cheema
    - Kalaske Cheema
  - Sialkot District
    - Jamke Cheema
    - Shamsa Cheema
    - Adamke Cheema
    - Baddoke Cheema
  - Rawalpindi District
    - Sui Cheemian

== See also ==
- Chima (disambiguation)
