= Vadala =

Vadala or Wadala may refer to:

== Places ==
=== India ===
- Wadala, a locality in Mumbai
  - Wadala Assembly constituency
  - Wadala Bridge monorail station
  - Wadala Depot monorail station
  - Wadala Road railway station
- Wadala Granthian, a village in Punjab
- Wadala Kalan, a village in Punjab
- Wadala Khurd, a village in Punjab
- Mota Vadala, a village in Gujarat

=== Pakistan ===
- Wadala Cheema, a village in Punjab
  - Wadala Cheema Halt railway station
- Wadala Sandhuan, a town in Punjab

== Others ==
- SS Vadala, a British steamship
- Vadala (surname)
- Wadala (surname)
- Shootout at Wadala, a 2013 Indian Hindi-language action film set in Wadala, Mumbai

== See also ==
- Vadali (disambiguation)
- Wadali brothers, Sufi singers from India
