= Gonzalo Flores =

Chilean footballer

Personal information
- Full name: Gonzalo Alejandro Flores Osorio
- Date of birth: 29 February 2000 (age 26)
- Place of birth: La Florida, Santiago, Chile
- Height: 1.92 m (6 ft 4 in)
- Position: Goalkeeper

Team information
- Current team: Coquimbo Unido
- Number: 1

Youth career
- 14 de Agosto
- Audax Italiano
- 2016: Palestino
- 2016–2019: Universidad de Chile

Senior career*
Years	Team	Apps	(Gls)
2020	Deportes Linares	0	(0)
2020–2024	Deportes Santa Cruz	39	(0)
2025–	Coquimbo Unido	7	(0)
- * Club domestic league appearances and goals as of 23 May 2026

Gonzalo Alejandro Flores Osorio (born 29 February 2000) is a Chilean professional footballer who plays as a goalkeeper for Chilean Primera División side Coquimbo Unido.

== Career ==
As a youth player, Flores was with Club Deprtivo 14 de Agosto. He was trained at Audax Italiano and Palestino as a central midfielder before joining the Universidad de Chile youth ranks as a goalkeeper in 2017. In 2019, he left the football activity to take care of his daughter.

In 2020, Flores returned to football joining Deportes Linares. In the second half of the same year, he signed with Deportes Santa Cruz and spent five seasons with them.

In December 2024, Flores signed with Coquimbo Unido in the Chilean top level and helped them to win the first Chilean Primera División title for the club. The next season, they won the 2026 Supercopa de Chile. At international level, Flores made his debut in the 3–0 home victory against Deportes Tolima for the 2026 Copa Libertadores.

== International career ==
In May 2026, Flores was called up to a training microcycle of Chile national team under Nicolás Córdova.

== Honours ==
Coquimbo Unido

- Chilean Primera División: 2025
- Supercopa de Chile: 2026
- Copa de La Liga: 2026
