= Benjamín Chandía =

Chilean footballer

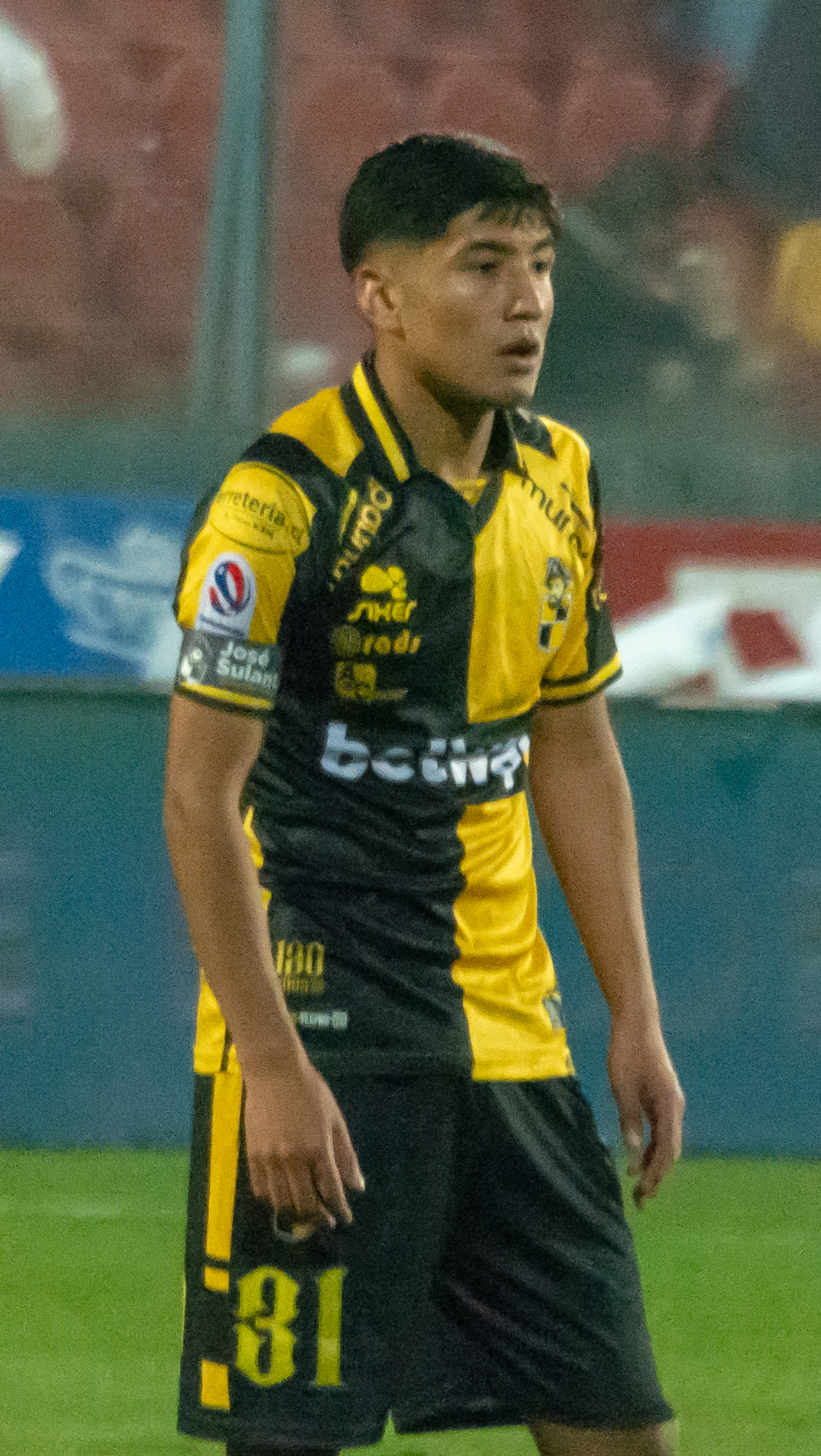
- Chandía with Coquimbo Unido in 2023

Personal information
- Full name: Benjamín Andrés Chandía Miles
- Date of birth: 25 November 2002 (age 23)
- Place of birth: Vicuña, Chile
- Height: 1.66 m (5 ft 5 in)
- Position: Left winger

Team information
- Current team: Coquimbo Unido
- Number: 30

Youth career
- Barrabases Vicuña
- 2019–2021: Coquimbo Unido

Senior career*
Years	Team	Apps	(Gls)
2021–	Coquimbo Unido	92	(6)

International career^{‡}
2026–	Chile	1	(0)
- * Club domestic league appearances and goals as of 14 March 2026 ‡ National team caps and goals as of 27 March 2026

Benjamín Andrés Chandía Miles (born 25 November 2002) is a Chilean professional footballer who plays as a left winger for Chilean Primera División side Coquimbo Unido and the Chile national team.

== Club career ==
Born in Vicuña, Chile, Chandía played for club Barrabases in his hometown. He came to Coquimbo Unido youth system at the age of 16 after taking part in a tournament between commune teams from Coquimbo Region.

Chandía was called up to the Coquimbo Unido first team in 2021 for the Copa Chile and made his professional debut in the 0–0 draw against Fernández Vial on 10 July of the same year. As an anecdote, he wore boots borrowed from his then teammate Carlos Carmona. He scored his first goal at league level in the 2–3 win against Colo-Colo on 26 February 2023.

A regular player of Coquimbo Unido since 2023, Chandía competed at the 2024 Copa Sudamericana with them and won the 2025 league title, the first one for the club.

== International career ==
During 2023, Chandía and his teammate Dylan Escobar were called up to training microcycles of the Chile under-23 national team with views to the 2023 Pan American Games.

At senior level, Chandía received his first call-up for the 2026 FIFA Series matches against Cape Verde and New Zealand on 27 and 30 March 2026, respectively. He made his debut in the first match by replacing Maximiliano Gutiérrez at the minute 78 and made an assist to Gonzalo Tapia the next minute.

== Style of play ==
Mainly a left winger, Chandía can also operate as an attacking midfielder or a right winger.

== Personal life ==
Chandía is nicknamed Chandi, a short form of his surname.

== Career statistics ==
=== International ===
As of match played 27 March 2026

Appearances and goals by national team and year
National team	Year	Apps	Goals
Chile	2026	1	0
Total		1	0

== Honours ==
Coquimbo Unido

- Primera B de Chile: 2021
- Chilean Primera División: 2025
- Supercopa de Chile: 2026
- Copa de La Liga: 2026

Individual

- Chilean Primera División Best Youth Player: 2025
