= Alejandro Camargo =

Argentine-Chilean footballer (born 1989)

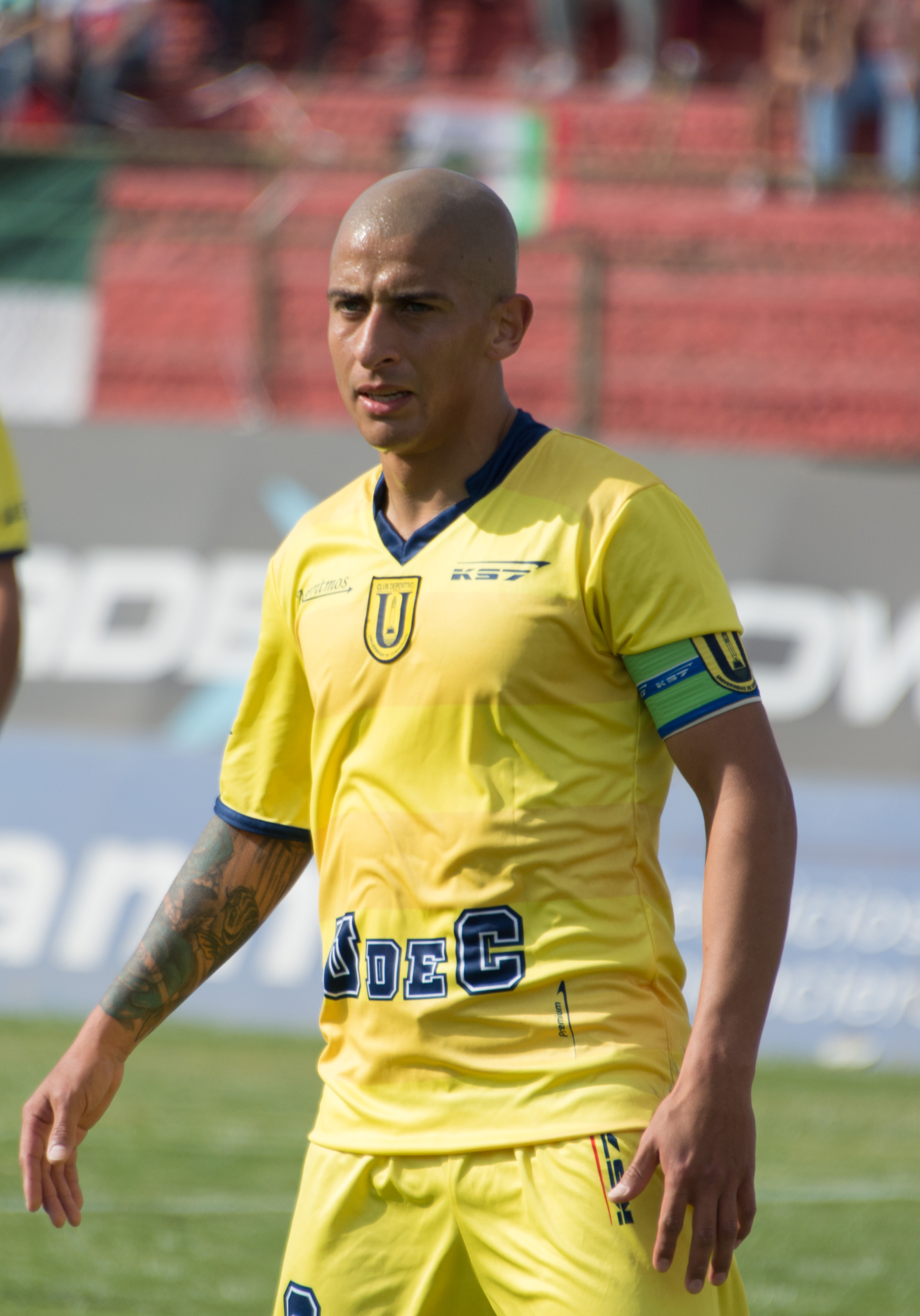
- Camargo with Universidad de Concepción in 2018

Personal information
- Date of birth: 12 June 1989 (age 37)
- Place of birth: Guaymallén, Argentina
- Height: 1.75 m (5 ft 9 in)
- Position: Defensive midfielder

Team information
- Current team: Coquimbo Unido
- Number: 8

Youth career
- Huracán Las Heras
- Godoy Cruz

Senior career*
Years	Team	Apps	(Gls)
2007–2012	Godoy Cruz	13	(1)
2011	Sarmiento de Junin	6	(0)
2012–2013	Gutiérrez	25	(4)
2013–2014	Lota Schwager	36	(1)
2014–2015	Curicó Unido	35	(5)
2015–2020	Universidad de Concepción	151	(5)
2021	Deportes Melipilla	28	(2)
2022–2023	Cobresal	55	(7)
2024–	Coquimbo Unido	22	(0)
- * Club domestic league appearances and goals as of 13 December 2023

Alejandro Maximiliano Camargo (born 12 June 1989) is an Argentine-Chilean professional footballer who plays as a defensive midfielder for Coquimbo Unido of the Primera División de Chile.

== Career ==
As a youth player, Camargo was with Huracán Las Heras.

Camargo previously played for Godoy Cruz in the Argentine Primera División.

His goal against O'Higgins was nominated for the FIFA Puskás Award in 2017.

In 2021, he played for Deportes Melipilla in the Chilean top division. The next season, he switched to Cobresal in the same division.

He spent two seasons with Cobresal, becoming the runner-up in the 2023 Chilean Primera División. He switched to Coquimbo Unido for the 2024 season and won the 2025 Chilean Primera División, the first one for the club.

== Personal life ==
He acquired the Chilean nationality by descent when he was a player of Lota Schwager, due to the fact that his mother, Jacqueline Cecilia, is Chilean. His maternal family comes from San Javier.

While playing for Gutiérrez, Camargo had a video shop in his neighbourhood.

== Honours ==
Sarmiento de Junín

- Primera B Metropolitana: 2011–12

Coquimbo Unido

- Chilean Primera División: 2025
- Supercopa de Chile: 2026
- Copa de La Liga: 2026
