= Diego Sánchez (footballer, born 1987) =

Chilean footballer

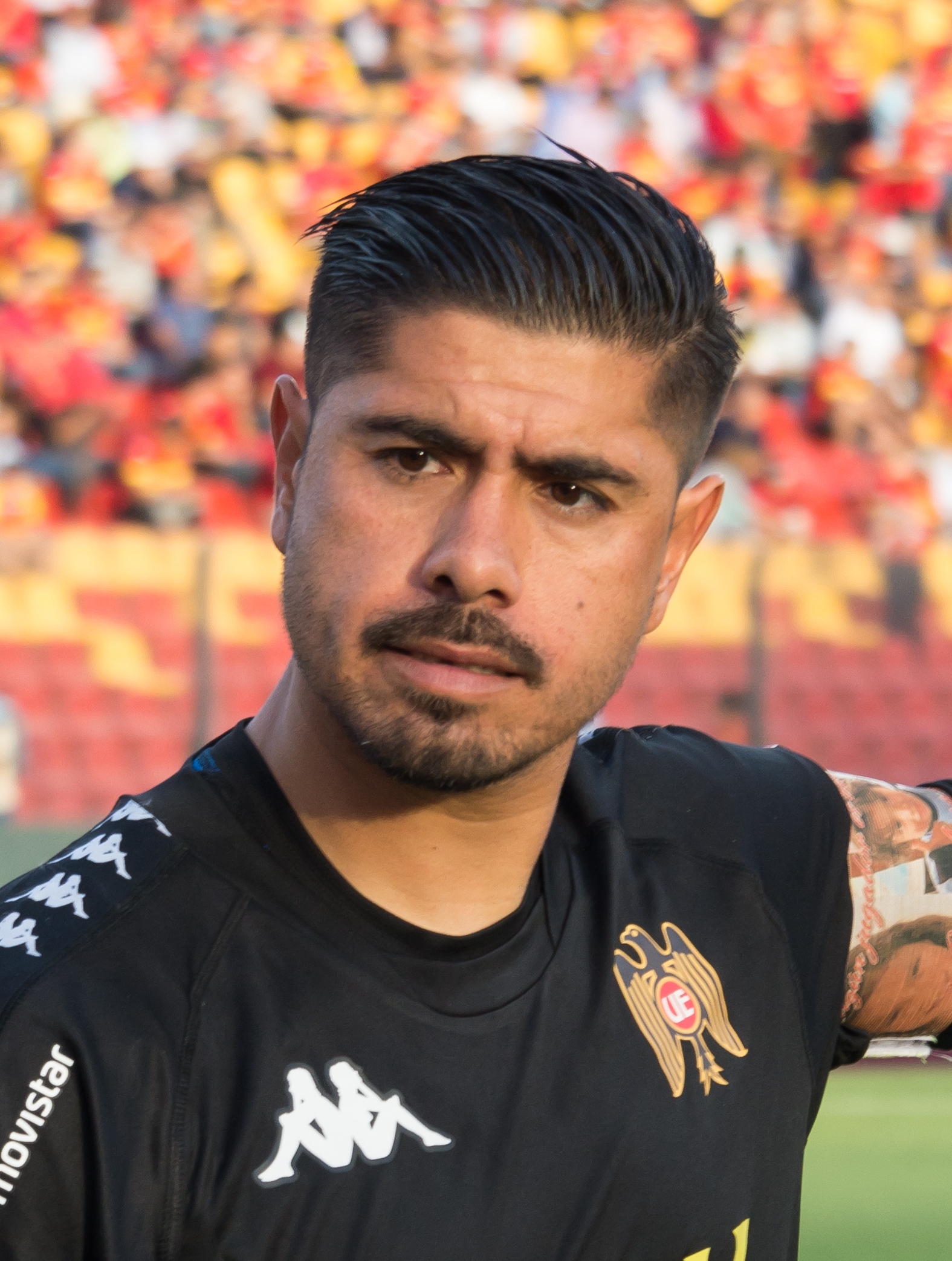
- Sánchez with Unión Española in 2019

Personal information
- Full name: Diego Ignacio Sánchez Carvajal
- Date of birth: 8 May 1987 (age 39)
- Place of birth: Santiago, Chile
- Height: 1.84 m (6 ft 0 in)
- Position: Goalkeeper

Team information
- Current team: Coquimbo Unido
- Number: 13

Youth career
- 2003–2007: Palestino

Senior career*
Years	Team	Apps	(Gls)
2007–2009	Palestino	5	(0)
2008	→ Unión Temuco (loan)	14	(0)
2009	Deportes Temuco	19	(0)
2010	Barnechea	20	(0)
2011–2012	Unión San Felipe	43	(0)
2013–2021	Unión Española	164	(0)
2022	Deportes Antofagasta	19	(0)
2023–	Coquimbo Unido	50	(0)
- * Club domestic league appearances and goals as of 20 December 2022

Diego Ignacio Sánchez Carvajal (Spanish pronunciation: [ˈdjeɣo ˈsantʃeθ], born 8 May 1987) is a Chilean footballer that currently plays for the Primera División club Coquimbo Unido as a goalkeeper.

== Club career ==
=== Early career ===
Born in Santiago, Sánchez joined Palestino youth ranks aged twelve thanks to his father Gustavo that played there during the 1980s and was member of the team's 1986 Primera División runner-up squad. Diego was promoted to Palestino first adult team in 2007 by Luis Musrri (club's coach), because the bad shape of Fernando Burgos in the goal, and the injury of first-choice Felipe Núñez. On 8 August, he made his debut against Universidad Católica in a 1–1 draw at Estadio Nacional, playing another four games that season.

In January 2008, Sánchez was loaned to third-tier side Unión Temuco, for then the next season join cross–town rivals Deportes Temuco, for finally move to Barnechea in 2010, being all of those third-level teams. Because his well performances he join first-tier club Unión San Felipe in 2011, where in his second game against Universidad de Chile was the man of the match in a 2–0 away win. However, the next season San Felipe relegated to Primera B and Sánchez was released of Aconcagua Valley-based team.

In December 2022, he joined Coquimbo Unido for the 2023 season.

== International career ==
Sánchez got his first call up to the senior Chile squad for friendlies against Venezuela and Uruguay in November 2014.

== Personal life ==
Diego is the son of Gustavo Sánchez, a former goalkeeper for Palestino in the 1980s who represented Chile in the 1985 Indonesian Independence Cup.

== Honours ==
Unión Española

- Chilean Primera División: 2013 Transición
- Supercopa de Chile: 2013

Coquimbo Unido

- Chilean Primera División: 2025
- Supercopa de Chile: 2026
- Copa de La Liga: 2026

Individual

- Chilean Primera División Ideal Team: 2025
