= Francisco Salinas =

Chilean footballer

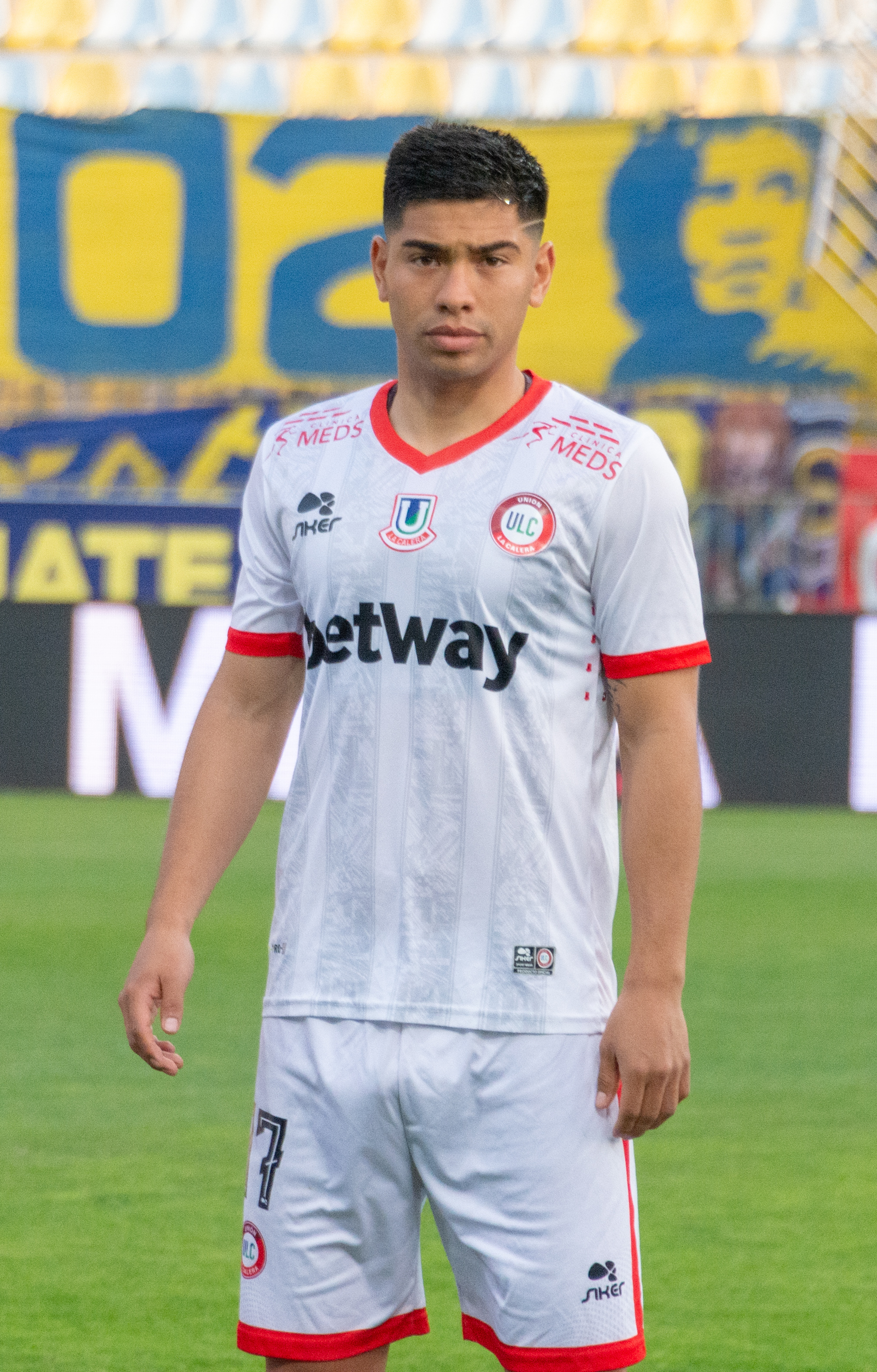
- Salinas with Unión La Calera in 2023

Personal information
- Full name: Francisco Antonio Salinas Concha
- Date of birth: 4 December 1999 (age 26)
- Place of birth: San Felipe, Chile
- Height: 1.79 m (5 ft 10 in)
- Position: Right-back

Team information
- Current team: Coquimbo Unido
- Number: 17

Youth career
- Mario Inostroza
- 2014–2017: Unión San Felipe

Senior career*
Years	Team	Apps	(Gls)
2017–2023	Unión San Felipe	113	(4)
2023	→ Unión La Calera (loan)	25	(2)
2024–	Coquimbo Unido	73	(9)
2024	→ Unión San Felipe (loan)	14	(1)

International career^{‡}
2025–	Chile	4	(0)
- * Club domestic league appearances and goals as of 8 November 2025 ‡ National team caps and goals as of 29 September 2026

Francisco Antonio Salinas Concha (born 4 December 1999) is a Chilean footballer who plays as a right-back for Coquimbo Unido in the Chilean Primera División and the Chile national team.

== Club career ==
Born in San Felipe, Chile, Salinas was with CD Mario Inostroza before joining the Unión San Felipe youth system in 2014 and signed his first professional contract in January 2019. Despite he was with the first team since 2017 as a substitute player, he made his debut in the first matchday of the 2019 season against Barnechea on 16 February.

A regular player for four seasons with Unión San Felipe, he was loaned out to Unión La Calera in the Chilean top division for the 2023 season, making his debut in a friendly match against River Plate on 22 December 2022. At league level, he made twenty five appearances, scored two goals and made three assists.

In 2024, Salinas moved to Coquimbo Unido in the same division, a club qualified to the Copa Sudamericana. After a brief stint on loan with Unión San Felipe in the second half of 2024, he returned to Coquimbo Unido for the 2025 season. and won the 2025 league title, the first one for the club.

== International career ==
Salinas received his first call up to the Chile national team for the friendly match against Peru on 10 October 2025. He made his debut in the friendly against Russia on 15 November 2025.

== Personal life ==
Salinas is nicknamed Coreano (Korean) due to his resemblance to Asian people.

== Career statistics ==
=== International ===
As of match played 29 September 2026

Appearances and goals by national team and year
National team	Year	Apps	Goals
Chile	2025	2	0
Chile	2026	2	0
Total		4	0

== Honours ==
Coquimbo Unido

- Chilean Primera División: 2025
- Supercopa de Chile: 2026
- Copa de La Liga: 2026
