= Martín Mundaca =

Chilean footballer (born 2007)

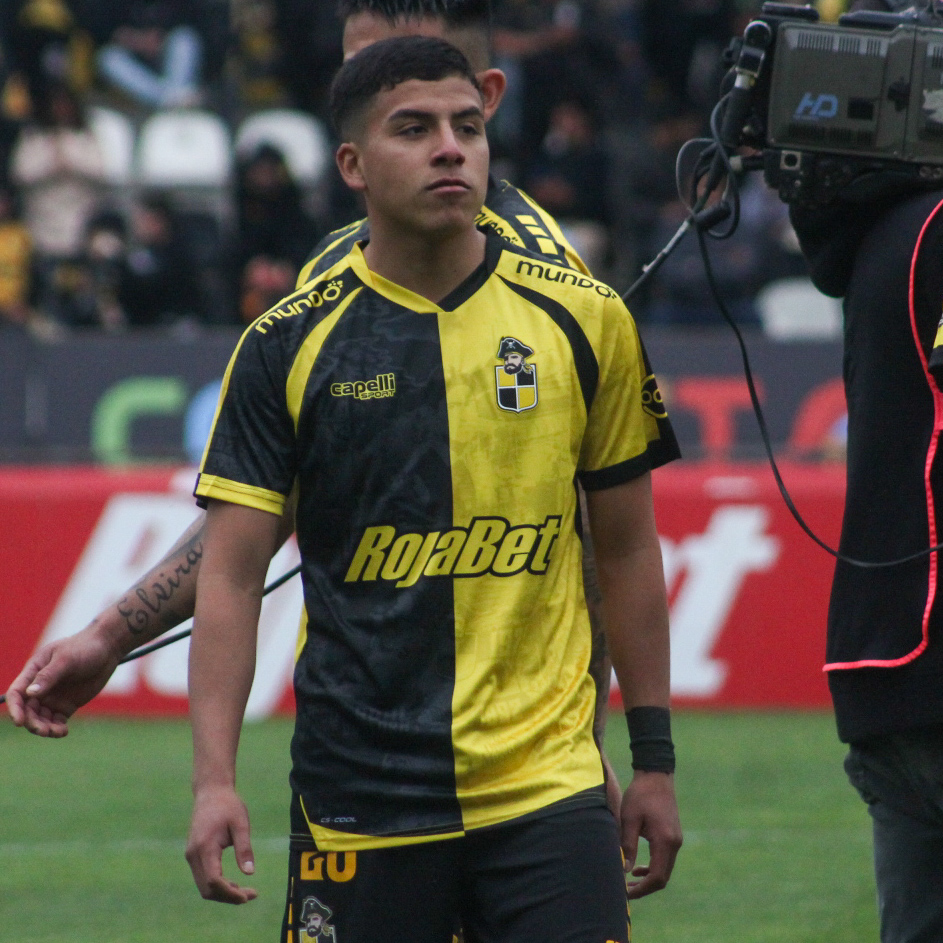
- Mundaca with Coquimbo Unido in 2025

Personal information
- Full name: Martín Andrés Mundaca Barraza
- Date of birth: 8 January 2007 (age 19)
- Place of birth: Ovalle, Chile
- Height: 1.75 m (5 ft 9 in)
- Position: Left winger

Team information
- Current team: Coquimbo Unido
- Number: 32

Youth career
- Campo Lindo
- 2015–2021: Academia Municipal Ovalle
- 2019: Universidad de Chile
- 2022–2024: Coquimbo Unido

Senior career*
Years	Team	Apps	(Gls)
2024–	Coquimbo Unido	17	(3)

International career^{‡}
2024	Chile U18	1	(0)
2024–2026	Chile U20	7	(1)
- * Club domestic league appearances and goals as of 12 December 2024 ‡ National team caps and goals as of 25 September 2026

Martín Andrés Mundaca Barraza (born 8 January 2007) is a Chilean professional footballer who plays as a left winger for Chilean Primera División side Coquimbo Unido.

== Club career ==
Born in Ovalle, Chile, Mundaca was with Club Deportivo Campo Lindo, Academia Municipal de Fútbol Ovalle and the Universidad de Chile under-13 team before joining the Coquimbo Unido youth ranks in 2022.

Mundaca made his professional debut in the Chilean Primera División match against Audax Italiano on 28 March 2024. As an anecdote, he joined the first team after the manager Fernando Díaz needed one player to finish a training session. He stood out in his second official match against Cobreloa on 7 April of the same year by scoring twice, surpassing records of players such as Alexis Sánchez and Jeisson Vargas. Two weeks later, he scored again in the 2–0 win against O'Higgins.

With Coquimbo Unido, Mundaca also competed at the 2024 Copa Sudamericana, with appearances against Sportivo Luqueño and Racing Club, and won the 2025 Chilean Primera División, the first one for the club.

== International career ==
In his youth, Mundaca was called up to the Chile under-16 team.

During 2024, Mundaca was frequently called up to friendly tournaments and training microcycles of the Chile under-20 national team with views to the 2025 FIFA U20 World Cup. As a member of the Chile under-18 team, he took part in the Leonel Sánchez Tournament in October 2024.

Mundaca was called up to the Chile under-20 squad for the friendly matches against Brazil on 6 and 9 June 2026. In September of the same year, he represented them at the South American Games.

== Honours ==
Coquimbo Unido

- Chilean Primera División: 2025
- Supercopa de Chile: 2026
- Copa de La Liga: 2026
