= Hernán Caputto =

Argentine-Chilean football manager and player

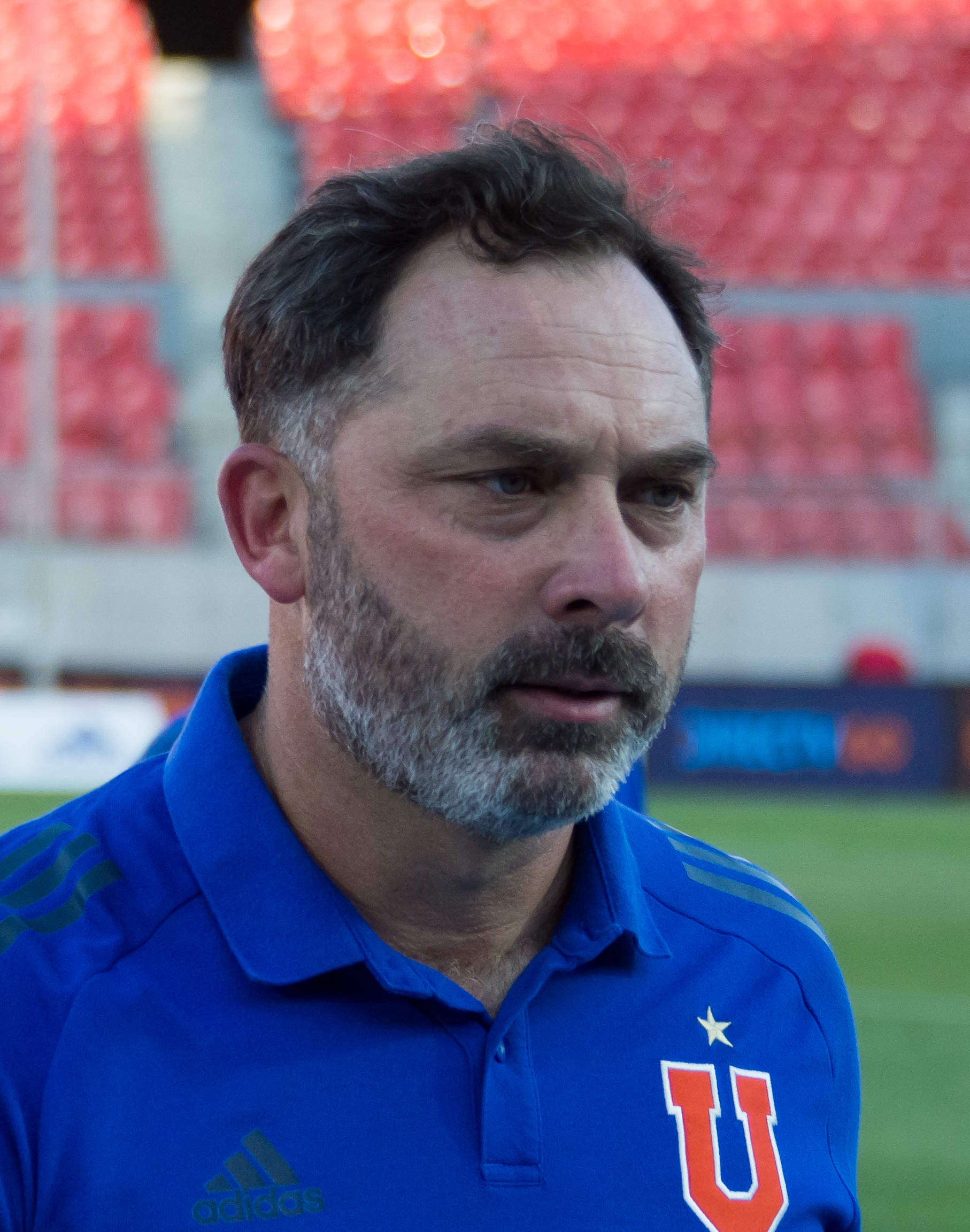
- Caputto with Universidad de Chile in 2020.

Personal information
- Full name: Héctor Hernán Caputto Gómez
- Date of birth: October 6, 1974 (age 52)
- Place of birth: San Andrés de Giles, Buenos Aires, Argentina
- Height: 1.84 m (6 ft 0 in)
- Position: Goalkeeper

Team information
- Current team: Coquimbo Unido (manager)

Youth career
- El Frontón
- Platense

Senior career*
Years	Team	Apps	(Gls)
1989–1993	Platense		
1995–1997	Tigre	26	(0)
1997–1999	Provincial Osorno	97	(0)
2000–2003	Unión Española	46	(0)
2001	→ Magallanes (loan)		
2004	Deportes Puerto Montt	13	(0)
2004	PSM Makassar	8	(0)
2004–2005	Palestino	39	(0)
2006	Unión San Felipe	14	(0)
2006–2009	Universidad de Chile	11	(0)
2010–2011	Huachipato	3	(0)

Managerial career
- 2013–2015: Chile U15
- 2016–2019: Chile U17
- 2019–2020: Universidad de Chile
- 2021–2023: Chile U17
- 2023: Ñublense
- 2024–2025: Deportes Copiapó
- 2026–: Coquimbo Unido
- * Club domestic league appearances and goals

Héctor Hernán Caputto Gómez (born 6 October 1974 in San Andrés de Giles), known as Hernán Caputto, is an Argentine naturalized Chilean football manager and former footballer who played as a goalkeeper. He is the current manager of Coquimbo Unido.

== Playing career ==
As a youth player, Caputto was with Club Social y Deportivo El Frontón. A product of Platense, he has never played in Argentine Primera División. In the Chilean Primera División Caputto has played for Unión Española, Palestino, Deportes Puerto Montt, and Provincial Osorno. In the Chilean Second Division Caputto has played for Magallanes and Unión San Felipe. In the Argentine Second Division he played for Tigre. In addition, he had a brief step with Indonesian club PSM Makassar in 2004.

Before the 2006 Clausura tournament in Chile, Caputto was signed by Universidad de Chile to replace José Carlo Fernández. Caputto was the backup until January 27, 2008, when, after a year and a half on Universidad de Chile, Caputto finally debuted with 2–1 victory over Deportes Concepción in the 2008 Apertura opener. Regular first team goalkeeper Miguel Pinto was in Asia with the Chile national team.

Caputto retired from football in 2011.

== Managerial career ==
From 2011 to 2012, Caputto worked as the goalkeeping coach of Chile at youth levels and as the coach of Chile at under-15 level between 2013 and 2015, winning the friendly 2015 Aspire Tri-Series International Tournament in Doha, Qatar. In 2016 he assumed as the coach of Chile U17, getting qualification to two World Cup editions: 2017 and 2019.

After Alfredo Arias was released from Universidad de Chile, in 2019 he assumed as the coach for the first team until November 2020.

In the second half of 2023, he led Ñublense.

On 13 December 2025, Caputto was appointed as the manager of the Chilean champions Coquimbo Unido.

== Personal life ==
Caputto naturalized Chilean by residence.

His son, Franco, is a footballer from the Barnechea youth ranks.

== Honours ==
=== Player ===
Universidad de Chile

- Primera División de Chile (1): 2009 Apertura

=== Manager ===
Chile U15

- Aspire Tri-Series International Tournament: 2015

Coquimbo Unido

- Supercopa de Chile: 2026
- Copa de La Liga: 2026
