= Elvis Hernández =

Argentine-Chilean footballer (born 1999)

Personal information
- Full name: Elvis Hernández Huentén
- Date of birth: 24 September 1999 (age 27)
- Place of birth: Neuquén, Argentina
- Height: 1.83 m (6 ft 0 in)
- Position: Centre-back

Team information
- Current team: Coquimbo Unido
- Number: 4

Youth career
- Maronese
- 2017–2018: Cipolletti

Senior career*
Years	Team	Apps	(Gls)
2018–2023	Cipolletti	97	(2)
2020	→ Unión La Calera (loan)	0	(0)
2022	→ 9 de Julio (loan)	7	(0)
2024–	Coquimbo Unido	9	(0)
- * Club domestic league appearances and goals as of 1 April 2024

Elvis Hernández Huentén (born 24 September 1999) is an Argentine-Chilean footballer who plays as a centre-back for Chilean Primera División side Coquimbo Unido.

== Club career ==
Born in Neuquén, Argentina, Hernández was with Maronese before joining Cipolletti in 2017. After winning the Apertura 2018 of the Liga Deportiva Confluencia, a Río Negro Province league, he made his debut with the first team against Independiente de Neuquén on 14 October 2018.

In 2019, he signed his first professional contract with Cipolletti and, subsequently, trialed with Chilean club Huachipato. In 2020, he was loaned out to Unión La Calera in the Chilean top division on a one-year deal.

Back to Cipolletti in 2021, he was loaned out to 9 de Julio in the second half of 2022.

In 2024, Hernández returned to Chile and signed with Coquimbo Unido in the top division, also making appearances in the Copa Sudamericana and winning the 2025 Chilean Primera División, the first one for the club.

== Personal life ==
Hernández holds dual Argentine-Chilean citizenship.

He is nicknamed Vikingo (Viking).

== Honours ==
Coquimbo Unido

- Chilean Primera División: 2025
- Supercopa de Chile: 2026
- Copa de La Liga: 2026
