= Benjamín Gazzolo =

Chilean footballer

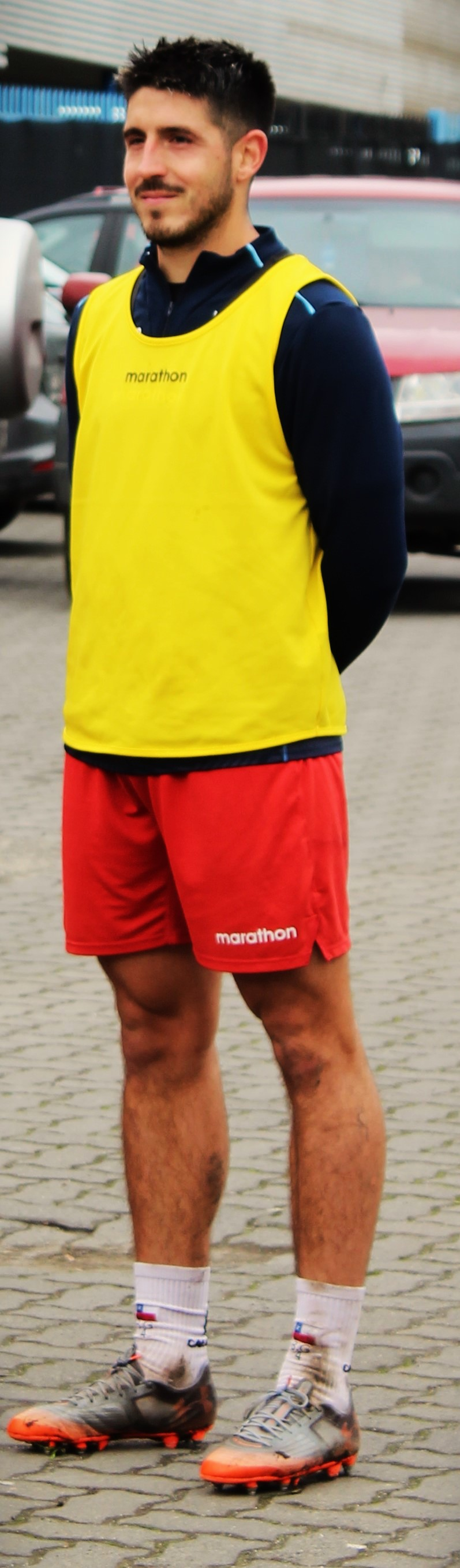
- Gazzolo with Huachipato in 2024

Personal information
- Full name: Benjamín José Gazzolo Freire
- Date of birth: 14 July 1997 (age 29)
- Place of birth: San Felipe, Chile
- Height: 1.82 m (6 ft 0 in)
- Position: Centre-back

Team information
- Current team: Coquimbo Unido
- Number: 2

Youth career
- Escuela Luis Quezada
- SuperDeportivo
- Unión San Felipe

Senior career*
Years	Team	Apps	(Gls)
2014–2019	Unión San Felipe	48	(0)
2020–2025	Huachipato	121	(4)
2026–	Coquimbo Unido	0	(0)

International career^{‡}
2016	Chile U20		
2019–2020	Chile U23		
- * Club domestic league appearances and goals as of 5 January 2026 ‡ National team caps and goals as of 22 March 2023

Benjamín José Gazzolo Freire (born 4 July 1997) is a Chilean footballer who plays as a centre-back for Coquimbo Unido.

== Club career ==
Born in San Felipe, Chile, as a child, Gazzolo played for Escuela de Fútbol Luis Quezada and SuperDeportivo before joining San Felipe's youth system, making his professional debut for Unión San Felipe at the age of sixteen.

In 2020, Gazzolo switched for Huachipato in the Chilean top division. He left them at the end of 2025.

On 12 January 2026, Gazzolo signed with then Chilean champions, Coquimbo Unido, winning the 2026 Supercopa de Chile and the 2026 Copa de La Liga. He became the first player to win the four main titles in Chilean football.

== International career ==
Gazzolo took part of the Chile under-23 squad in the 2020 Pre-Olympic Tournament. Previously, he was called up to Chile's squad at under-20 level in 2016.

== Personal life ==
He's an Unión San Felipe supporter. Gazzolo's father, Andrés, played football at amateur level for Deportivo Putaendo, as a goalkeeper. Gazzolo's twin brother, Santiago, also played youth football for Unión San Felipe.

Gazzolo is of Italian descent and holds Italian citizenship. His Italian relatives are fans of Genoa.

He got a degree in business administration.

== Honours ==
Huachipato

- Chilean Primera División: 2023
- Copa Chile: 2025

Coquimbo Unido

- Supercopa de Chile: 2026
- Copa de La Liga: 2026
