= Chima =

Chima may refer to:

== Entertainment ==
- Lego Legends of Chima, a 2013–2015 Lego theme
  - Legends of Chima, a 2013 television series
  - Lego Legends of Chima Online, a 2013 MMORPG

== People ==
=== Given name ===
- Chima (singer) (born 1972), Nigerian-born German singer
- Chima Akachukwu (born 2000), Nigerian cricketer
- Chima Akas (born 1994), Nigerian footballer
- Chima Ihekwoaba (born 1988), Canadian football player
- Chima Moneke (born 1995), Nigerian-Australian basketball player
- Chima Nwafor (born 1948), Nigerian surgeon and politician
- Chima Centus Nweze (1958–2023), Nigerian jurist
- Chima Nwosu (born 1986), Nigerian footballer
- Chima Obieze (born 1983), Nigerian lawyer and politician
- Chima Okorie (born 1968), Nigerian footballer
- Chima Okoroji (born 1997), German footballer
- Chima Onyeike (born 1975), Dutch association football coach
- Chima Simone (born 1976), American journalist
- Chima Ugwu (born 1973), Nigerian shot putter
- Chima Uzoka (born 1998), Filipino footballer
- Chima Williams, Nigerian environmental activist

=== Surname ===
- Cinda Williams Chima (born 1952), American fantasy author
- Udoka Chima (born 2002), Italian-born Nigerian footballer

== Places ==
- Chima, Santander, a town in Santander Department, Colombia
- Chimá, a town and municipality in Córdoba Department, Colombia
- Chima, Iran, or Chimeh, a village in Isfahan Province, Iran

== Other uses ==
- Chima (clothing), a type of traditional Korean skirt
  - Chima jeogori, a women's outfit consisting of a chima skirt and jeogori top
- Ugali, or chima, a type of corn meal in several African countries
- A nickname for chimarrão, names for the mate drink in Portuguese

== See also ==
- Cheema (disambiguation)
- Cimarron (disambiguation)
