= Lucas Pratto =

Argentine footballer

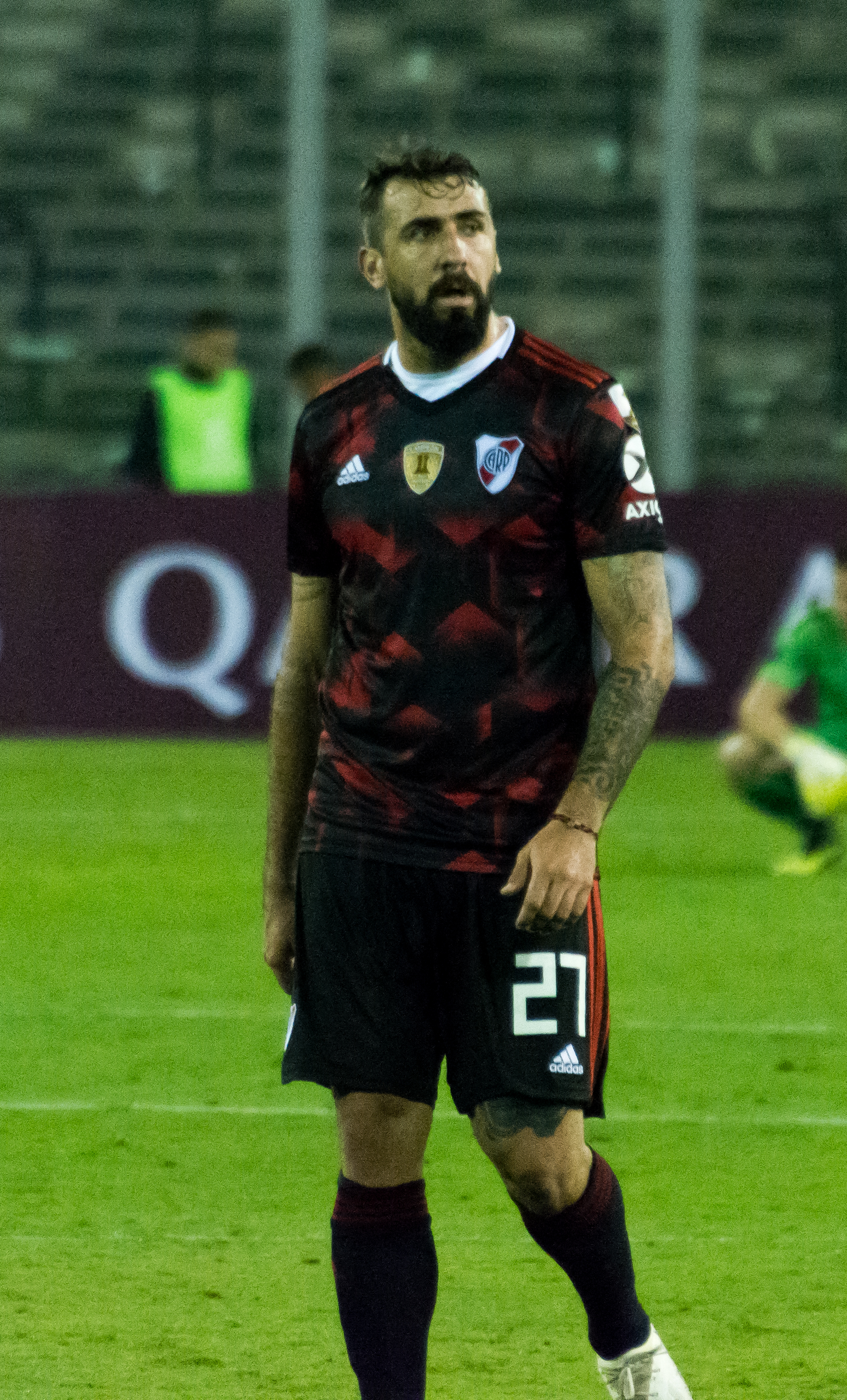
- Pratto with River Plate in 2018

Personal information
- Full name: Lucas David Pratto
- Date of birth: 4 June 1988 (age 38)
- Place of birth: La Plata, Argentina
- Height: 1.87 m (6 ft 2 in)
- Position: Striker

Team information
- Current team: Coquimbo Unido
- Number: 12

Youth career
- 2002–2005: Cambaceres
- 2006–2007: Boca Juniors

Senior career*
Years	Team	Apps	(Gls)
2007–2011	Boca Juniors	2	(0)
2007–2008	→ Tigre (loan)	13	(1)
2008–2009	→ Lyn (loan)	21	(4)
2010	→ Unión Santa Fe (loan)	19	(6)
2010–2011	→ Universidad Católica (loan)	35	(10)
2011–2012	Genoa	14	(1)
2012	→ Vélez Sarsfield (loan)	12	(2)
2012–2014	Vélez Sarsfield	85	(33)
2015–2017	Atlético Mineiro	54	(18)
2017	São Paulo	42	(12)
2018–2021	River Plate	58	(9)
2021	→ Feyenoord (loan)	7	(0)
2021–2023	Vélez Sarsfield	59	(6)
2023–2024	Defensa y Justicia	13	(3)
2024–2025	Olimpia	53	(6)
2025	Sarmiento de Junín	10	(0)
2026–	Coquimbo Unido	0	(0)

International career^{‡}
2016–2017	Argentina	5	(2)
- * Club domestic league appearances and goals as of 7 January 2026 ‡ National team caps and goals as of 28 March 2017

Lucas David Pratto, (Spanish pronunciation: [ˈlukas daˈβið ˈpɾato]; born 4 June 1988) nicknamed Oso (lit. 'Bear') is an Argentine professional footballer who plays as a striker for Liga de Primera club Coquimbo Unido.

Pratto has been described as possessing unusual technique and ball control for a player of strong physique. His first professional club was Boca Juniors, by whom he was loaned to Argentine sides Tigre and Unión, Norway's Lyn and Chile's Universidad Católica. His performances for the latter prompted a transfer to Italian club Genoa, shortly after which he joined Vélez Sarsfield, first on loan and then permanently, when he was elected Argentina's 2014 Footballer of the Year. He then moved to Brazil, playing for Atlético Mineiro and São Paulo, before returning to Argentina for River Plate in 2018, with whom he won the Copa Libertadores title later that year. In 2021, he joined Dutch club Feyenoord on loan.

Pratto has been capped at international level for Argentina.

== Early life ==
Pratto was born in La Plata, where he lived most of his early life in the Altos de San Lorenzo neighborhood. He started playing in local club Gimnasia of the Los Hornos neighborhood and was rejected by the youth ranks of Estudiantes de La Plata before eventually making it into the Defensores de Cambaceres youth team, where his brother then played.

== Club career ==
=== Early career and loan spells ===
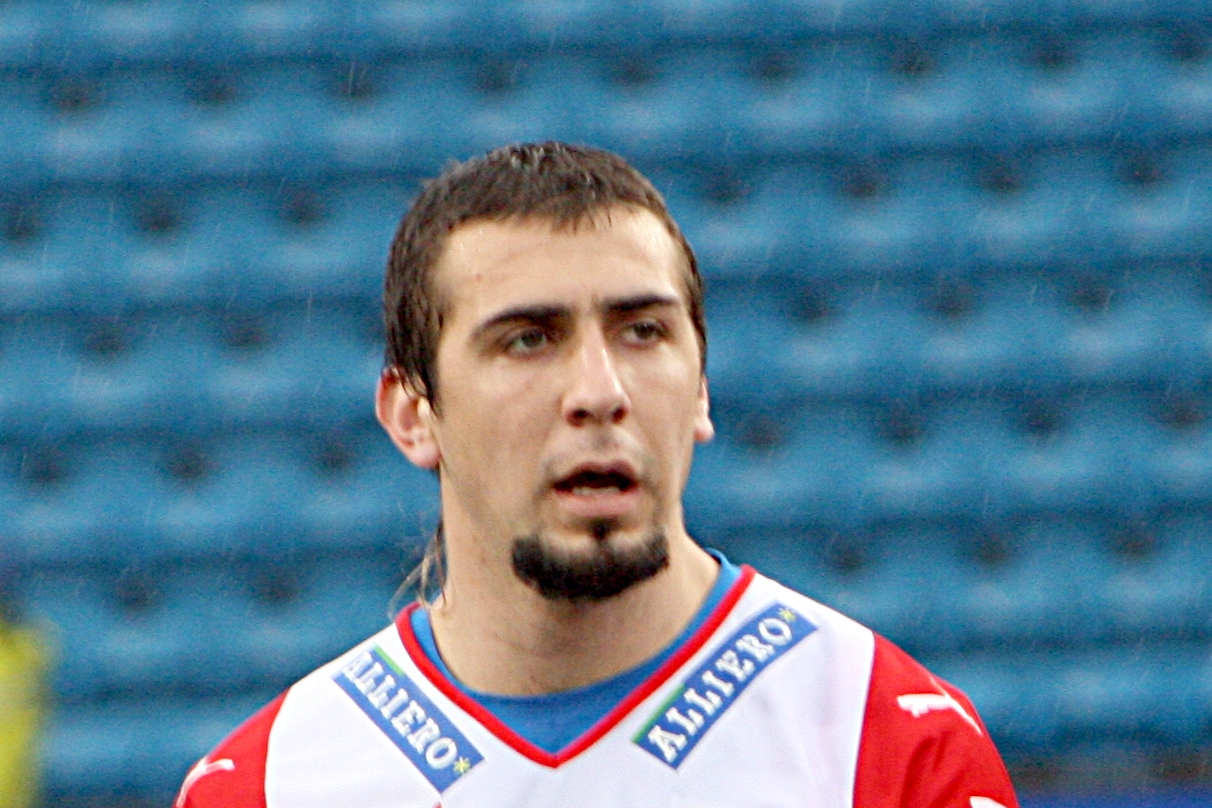
Pratto with Lyn in 2009

Product of Defensores de Cambaceres lower divisions, Pratto joined Argentine club Boca Juniors in 2006, after a recommendation by Martín Palermo. Once in the La Boca-based team, he was sent to the team's fifth division, where he scored more than 20 goals and formed an attacking partnership with Óscar Trejo.

In June 2007, he was loaned to Tigre, but mostly played for the reserve team in their first season. Leandro Lázzaro's departure to Estudiantes, however, allowed Pratto to break into the starting eleven and challenge the possibility of being the team's first choice striker. Following Lázzaro's absence, Lucas played ten 2008 Clausura games and scored one goal against San Martín de San Juan, which was his side's winning goal in a 2–1 home win at José Dellagiovanna.

On 2 August 2008, Pratto joined Norway's Lyn Fotball on a free loan from Boca, after being recommended by the scout Terje Liverød who helped with the negotiations. On 15 August, Lucas made a goalscoring debut during a 3–1 defeat against Molde FK in a Tippeligaen game as a 71st-minute substitute. Between 2008 and 2009 Pratto made 21 league appearances and scored four goals for Lyn. He then returned to Argentina in mid-2009 to join Boca's first-team squad, then coached by Alfio Basile.

After once again not being considered at the La Bombonera squad, Pratto had another brief loan spell in the first half of 2010, this time at Unión de Santa Fe in the Primera B Nacional.

=== Universidad Católica ===
On 29 June 2010 Pratto joined Chile's Universidad Católica on loan from Boca, this time as part of Gary Medel's contract extension negotiation. In the Chilean club, Pratto scored in his debut against Everton in a 1–1 league draw at Viña del Mar. At first, Lucas was heavily criticized for his bad shape at the Las Condes-based team, but key goals in the end of the season against Universidad de Chile and Cobreloa helped Católica achieve their 10th Campeonato Nacional title. He had an impressive season start in 2011 when he scored six Copa Libertadores goals (including a brace against Grêmio, in a historic 2–1 triumph at Brazil) and six league goals, which allowed him be sold by Boca to Italian Serie A side Genoa for a US$2,4 million fee.

=== Genoa ===
Pratto joined the Genovese club on 30 June 2011, being described months before by the club's president Enrico Preziosi as the team's new Diego Milito. He officially debuted as a starter during Genoa's first 2011–12 Coppa Italia game against Nocerina in a 4–3 home win, in which he scored his side's second goal after an assist by Kévin Constant. His Serie A debut was on 11 September in a 2–2 draw with Atalanta for the league's first matchday, and his first goal came on 18 December in a 2–1 victory over Bologna, the match-winner at the 85th minute. His second goal for Coppa Italia was on 24 November against Bari in a 3–2 victory, where once again he scored the match's winning goal, now after an impressive header in the 115th minute during extra-time. Pratto made an attacking partnership with Rodrigo Palacio, but coach Alberto Malesani, by whom he was selected for the first squad, was fired in December 2011. Since that time Lucas failed to play the rest of season, being relegated to the bench by the team's next coaches (Pasquale Marino, the same Malesani and Luigi De Canio).

=== Vélez Sarsfield ===
"Pratto's football matches mine. We understood each other pretty quickly. I don't have his strength, nor his guts. I don't know where he takes it from. I did not expect for him to be so technical. When I saw him training, I realized I had a great passer by my side."

— Facundo Ferreyra, Pratto's attack partner in Vélez Sarsfield, about his style of play.

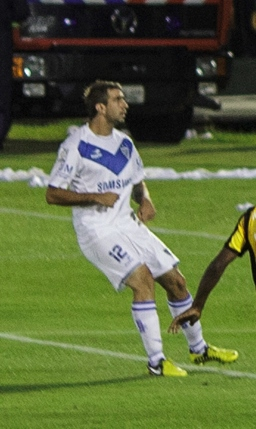
Pratto playing for Vélez during a 2013 Copa Libertadores match against Peñarol

On 7 February 2012 it was reported that Pratto had joined Vélez Sarsfield in a season-long loan deal, with the option to be fully signed by the Argentine club. After a decent first season with the Liniers side, in which he played 20 times and scored 4 goals, Lucas became a starter during Vélez's 2012 Torneo Inicial championship-winning campaign. Pratto made a partnership with Facundo Ferreyra, and played a key role appearing in all 19 games and scoring seven goals.

In January 2013 it was reported that Vélez had come to an agreement with Genoa for the definitive purchase of the player on a three-year contract. On 29 June 2013, Lucas scored the match winner in the Superfinal, the match that concluded the 2012–13 Primera División season, as Vélez defeated Newell's 1–0 and were crowned Super Champions. At the end of the year Pratto was selected as Vélez's best player of the season.

In the start of 2014 he won the Supercopa Argentina with his club, and was the top goalscorer of the Torneo de Transición, with 11 goals. For his performances Pratto was once again selected as Vélez's player of the year, and was honored with the Olimpia de Plata award as Footballer of the Year of Argentina, chosen by Argentine sports media as the best player in the local league.

=== Atlético Mineiro ===
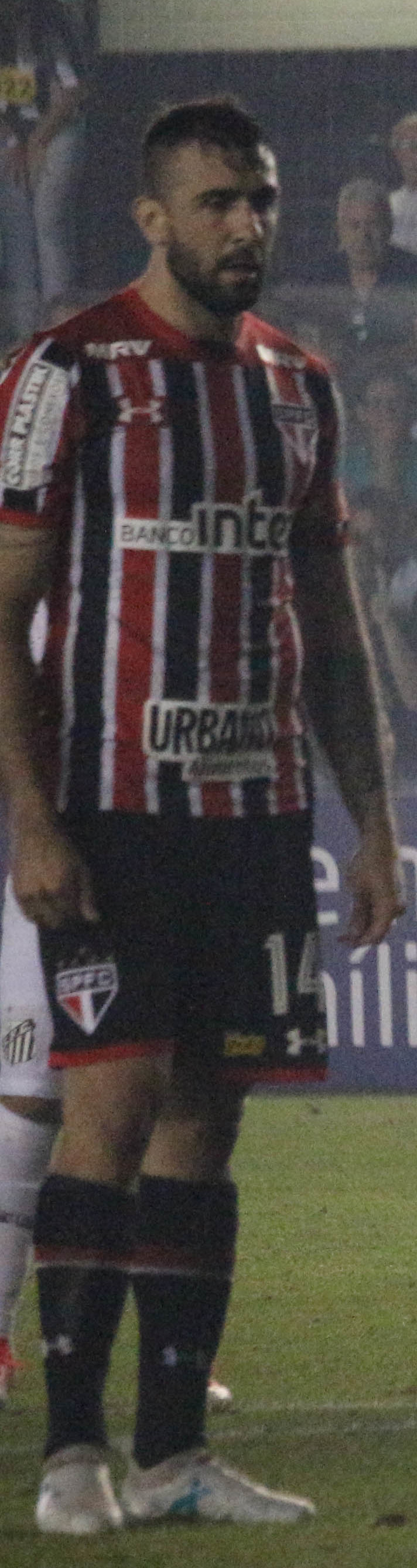
Pratto with São Paulo in 2017

On 16 December 2014, Lucas Pratto joined Brazilian club Atlético Mineiro on a four-year contract. Pratto made his unofficial debut and scored his first goal for Atlético in a pre-season friendly against Shakhtar Donetsk, which his new team won 4–2. Pratto also scored in his first official match for the club, against Tupi, for the 2015 Campeonato Mineiro, as well as in his debut in Copa Libertadores for Atlético, scoring the winner in a 1–0 away win against Independiente Santa Fé.

In the second leg of the Campeonato Mineiro semifinals against fierce rivals Cruzeiro, Pratto managed to score a brace with two assists by Guilherme, one of the goals an impressive volley, and helped his team make a 2–1 comeback after trailing in half-time. Atlético were eventually crowned champions of the competition, with Pratto finishing with six goals and being selected for the team of the tournament and as its best player. In July 2015, Pratto became Atlético's highest-ever foreign goalscorer and scored his first-ever hat-trick, with all three goals coming in the first half of a 3–1 home win against São Paulo. He still holds this record as the club's highest-ever foreign goalscorer, with 42 goals.

=== São Paulo ===
On 10 February 2017, Pratto signed a four-year contract with Brazilian club São Paulo FC. The transfer totalled around €12 million, with the São Paulo-based club paying approximately €6 million for 50 per cent of the player's rights. According to Carlos Augusto de Barros e Silva, São Paulo's president, the club would acquire up to 95% of the rights in the future. Atlético Mineiro president Daniel Nepomuceno stated that payment for the remaining shares would occur within three years.

He netted in his debut for Tricolor, in a 2–2 draw against Mirassol, and, three days later, he scored twice in his second match for club, in a 3–2 victory against São Bento. Pratto, along with his compatriot Calleri, is the only debut player at the club to score in his two first official matches.

On 9 July 2017, Pratto lost a penalty kick in a 3–2 loss of São Paulo FC against rivals Santos FC. At the end of this match, he was seven consecutive games without scoring any goal.

=== River Plate ===
On 8 January 2018, São Paulo confirmed the selling of Pratto to River Plate for €11.5 million, becoming River's highest ever transfer acquisition.

Pratto scored two goals in the 2018 Copa Libertadores finals against Boca Juniors, once in each leg, helping River to the title.

=== Feyenoord ===
On 1 January 2021, Eredivisie club Feyenoord announced the signing of Pratto on loan for the remainder of the season. He made his debut nine days later, in a Rotterdam derby against Sparta in the league, won 2–0 by Feyenoord.

On 9 May, in a 3–0 league defeat to Ajax, Pratto suffered a fracture in his right ankle when challenging for the ball; he underwent surgery on the same day, with an expected recovery time of four to six months.

=== Return to Vélez Sarsfield ===
On 27 August 2021, Pratto returned to Vélez Sarsfield, with a contract valid until December 2023. Pratto made his debut on 30 October 2021 in a substitute appearance against Banfield, coming on for Agustín Bouzat, where the match finished 2–1 to Banfield. His first goal came on 23 November 2021, against Argentinos Juniors, to make the score 2–0 to Vélez. However, he was released from the club in June 2023, due to bad results.

=== Defensa y Justicia ===
On 26 July 2023, Defensa y Justicia signed Pratto on a one-year deal. He made his debut on 1 August 2023 against Emelec in a 2–1 win in the Copa Sudamericana, providing an assist for Nicolás Fernández. He made his league debut and scored his first goal in a 2–2 draw against Godoy Cruz on 12 September 2023.

=== Olimpia ===
On 13 January 2024, Pratto joined Paraguayan club Olimpia.

=== Sarmiento ===
On 5 July 2025, Pratto returned to Argentina to join Sarmiento, signing a contract until the end of 2026.

=== Coquimbo Unido ===
On 6 January 2026, Pratto returned to Chile and signed with then Chilean champions Coquimbo Unido.

== International career ==
Pratto received his first international call-up for Argentina on 12 August 2016, for 2018 FIFA World Cup qualification matches against Uruguay and Venezuela. He started for the national team for the first time in the match against Uruguay on 1 September 2016, and scored his first goal against Venezuela on 7 September. Pratto scored his second international goal helping Argentina to a 3–0 win over Colombia in November 2016.

In the Jorge Sampaoli's first calling up for Argentina, Pratto was not called, in spite of being remembered in Edgardo Bauza's lists.

== Style of play ==
"Lucas Pratto is the best "tough" player I've ever seen! It seems he will lose every ball, but he hardly does."

— Four-time Best Futsal Player in the World Falcão comments on Pratto's style of play.

Pratto has an unusually fast pace for a player with 1.88m, and frequently floats outside the box to assist other players. He has been praised for his technique, ball control, and link-up play. Tactically, Pratto has not usually been deployed as a target man centre forward throughout most of his career, as is commonly the case for a player with a strong physique; he has normally played as a striker or second striker. In his best season with Vélez, he played as a second striker or even as an outside forward, with Facundo Ferreyra occupying the centre-forward role. Upon his arrival at Atlético Mineiro, he started to play in a more central role in the attack, while still contributing with assists and playing in the flanks during the matches.

== Personal life ==
Pratto was raised by his mother Daniela, helped by his older brother Leandro. Aside from him, Lucas has three other siblings from his father's other family. Pratto has one daughter, Pia, born in 2010, and has tattoos portraying her and his mother. Lucas has an interest on rock and roll, being a fan of AC/DC, Foo Fighters, Kiss and Argentine band La Renga, of whom he also has a tattoo. He is also an avid fan of The Simpsons, has tattoos of both Homer and Bart, and an English bulldog named Santa's Little Helper. Pratto has stated that he is a Boca Juniors supporter. He holds an Italian passport.

== Career statistics ==
=== Club ===
As of 16 December 2024

Appearances and goals by club, season and competition
Club	Season	League			Cup		Continental		Other		Total	
Club	Season	Division	Apps	Goals	Apps	Goals	Apps	Goals	Apps	Goals	Apps	Goals
Tigre	2007–08	Primera División	13	1	—		—		—		13	1
Lyn	2008	Eliteserien	6	1	—		—		—		6	1
Lyn	2009	Eliteserien	15	3	4	3	—		—		19	6
Lyn	Total		21	4	4	3	0	0	0	0	25	7
Boca Juniors	2009–10	Primera División	2	0	—		—		—		2	0
Unión	2009–10	Primera Nacional	19	6	—		—		—		19	6
Universidad Católica	2010	Chilean Primera División	17	4	1	0	—		—		18	4
Universidad Católica	2011	Chilean Primera División	18	6	—		10 (Note: Appearances in Copa Libertadores)	6	—		28	12
Universidad Católica	Total		35	10	1	0	10	6	0	0	46	16
Genoa	2011–12	Serie A	14	1	3	2	—		—		17	3
Vélez Sarsfield	2011–12	Primera División	12	2	1	1	7	1	—		20	4
Vélez Sarsfield	2012–13	Primera División	33	10	1	0	7	1	—		41	11
Vélez Sarsfield	2013–14	Primera División	35	12	1	0	13 (Note: Seven appearances and three goals in Copa Libertadores, six appearances and two goals in Copa Sudamericana)	5	1 (Note: Appearance in Supercopa Argentina)	0	50	17
Vélez Sarsfield	2014	Primera División	17	11	—		—		—		17	11
Vélez Sarsfield	Total		97	35	3	1	27	7	1	0	128	43
Atlético Mineiro	2015	Campeonato Brasileiro	36	13	2	0	6	3	10 (Note: Appearances in Campeonato Mineiro)	6	54	22
Atlético Mineiro	2016	Campeonato Brasileiro	18	5	8	4	10	4	11 (Note: Ten appearances and six goals in Campeonato Mineiro, one appearance in Primeira Liga)	6	47	19
Atlético Mineiro	2017	Campeonato Brasileiro	0	0	0	0	0	0	3 (Note: Two appearances in Campeonato Mineiro, one appearance in Primeira Liga)	0	3	0
Atlético Mineiro	Total		54	18	10	4	16	7	24	12	104	41
São Paulo	2017	Campeonato Brasileiro	35	7	4	2	2 (Note: Appearances in Copa Sudamericana)	0	7 (Note: Appearances in Campeonato Paulista)	5	48	14
River Plate	2017–18	Primera División	13	3	4	4	6	2	1	0	24	9
River Plate	2018–19	Primera División	21	4	5	0	14	5	7 (Note: Four appearances and three goals in Copa de la Superliga, two appearances and one goal in Recopa Sudamericana, one appearance in FIFA Club World Cup)	4	47	13
River Plate	2019–20	Primera División	17	0	0	0	8	0	—		25	0
River Plate	2020	Primera División	7	2	—		6	2	—		13	4
River Plate	Total		58	9	9	4	34	9	8	4	109	26
Feyenoord	2020–21	Eredivisie	7	0	1	0	0	0	—		8	0
Vélez Sarsfield	2021	Primera División	5	1	—		—		—		5	1
Vélez Sarsfield	2022	Primera División	34	2	3	0	12	3	—		48	5
Vélez Sarsfield	2023	Primera División	20	3	1	0	—		—		21	3
Vélez Sarsfield	Total		59	6	4	0	12	3	0	0	75	9
Defensa y Justicia	2023	Primera División	13	3	4	0	6	0	—		23	3
Olimpia	2024	Paraguayan Primera División	38	5	1	0	1	0	—		40	5
Career Total			465	91	105	16	101	32	40	21	657	174

=== International ===
Argentina
Year	Apps	Goals
2016	4	2
2017	1	0
Total	5	2

Scores and results list Argentina's goal tally first:

Goal	Date	Venue	Opponent	Score	Result	Competition
1	6 September 2016	Estadio Metropolitano de Mérida, Mérida, Venezuela	Venezuela	1–2	2–2	2018 FIFA World Cup qualification
2	15 November 2016	Estadio San Juan del Bicentenario, San Juan, Argentina	Colombia	2–0	3–0	2018 FIFA World Cup qualification

== Honours ==
Universidad Católica

- Primera División de Chile: 2010

Vélez Sarsfield

- Primera División: 2012 Inicial
- Copa Campeonato: 2013
- Supercopa Argentina: 2013

Atlético Mineiro

- Campeonato Mineiro: 2015

River Plate

- Supercopa Argentina: 2017
- Copa Libertadores: 2018
- Copa Argentina: 2019
- Recopa Sudamericana: 2019

Olimpia

- Primera División: 2024 Clausura

Coquimbo Unido

- Supercopa de Chile: 2026
- Copa de La Liga: 2026

Individual

- Foreign Footballer of the Year of Chile: 2011
- Vélez Sarsfield Player of the Year: 2013, 2014
- Primera División de Argentina top scorer: 2014
- Footballer of the Year of Argentina: 2014
- Campeonato Mineiro Best Player: 2015
- Campeonaro Mineiro Team of the Year: 2015
- Campeonato Mineiro Best Goal: 2015
- Bola de Prata: 2015
- Campeonato Brasileiro Série A Best Foreign Player: 2015
