= Cristián Zavala =

Chilean footballer (born 1999)

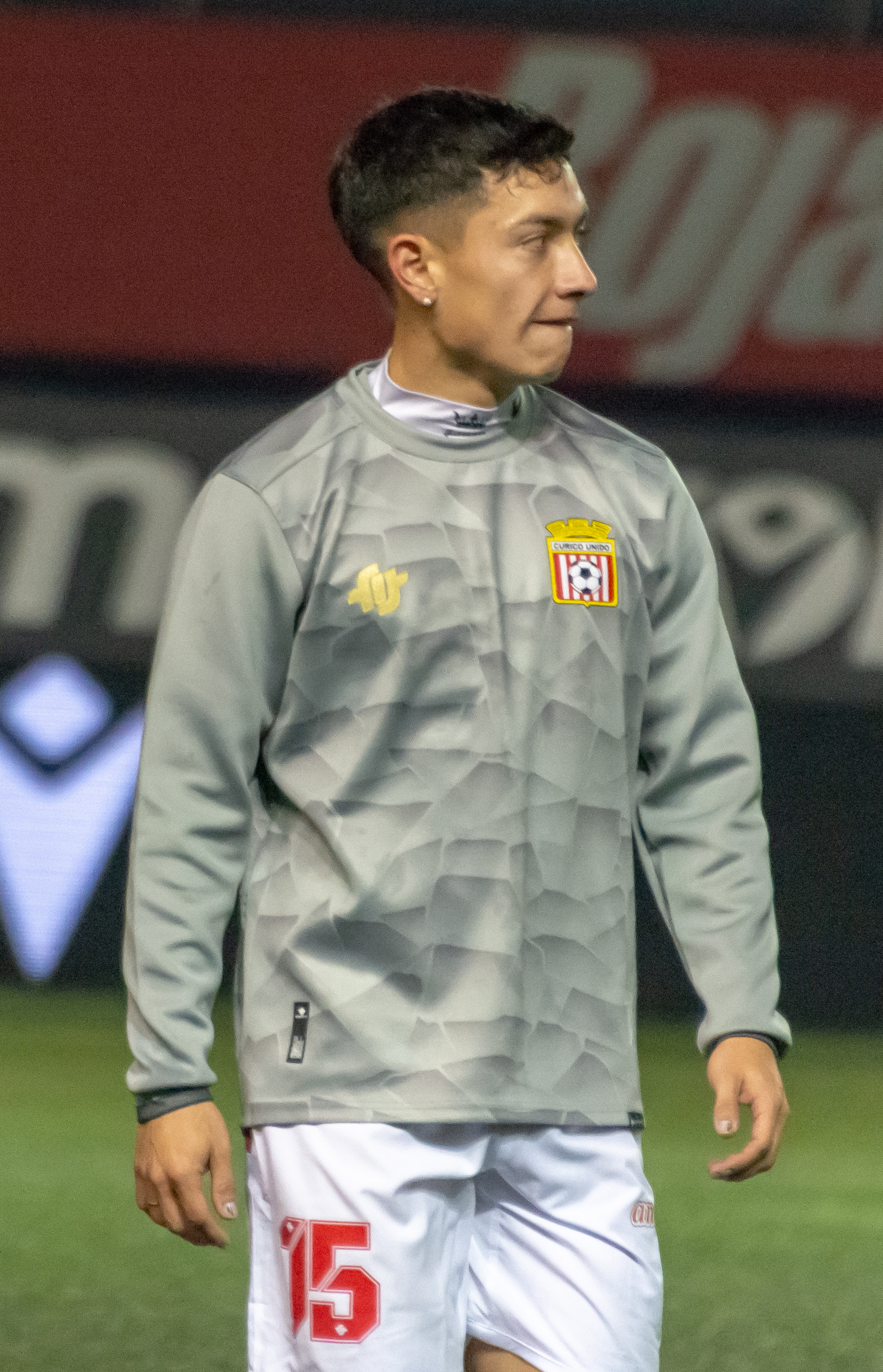
- Zavala with Curicó Unido in 2023

Personal information
- Full name: Cristián Alexander Zavala Briones
- Date of birth: August 3, 1999 (age 27)
- Place of birth: Puente Alto, Santiago, Chile
- Height: 1.73 m (5 ft 8 in)
- Position: Winger

Team information
- Current team: Coquimbo Unido (on loan from Colo-Colo)
- Number: 15

Youth career
- San Vicente de Pirque
- Colo-Colo
- Magallanes
- Coquimbo Unido

Senior career*
Years	Team	Apps	(Gls)
2018–2020	Coquimbo Unido	14	(0)
2020	→ Fernández Vial (loan)	8	(1)
2021	Deportes Melipilla	31	(5)
2022–	Colo-Colo	46	(4)
2023	→ Curicó Unido (loan)	26	(1)
2025–	→ Coquimbo Unido (loan)	13	(2)

International career^{‡}
2021–	Chile	3	(0)
- * Club domestic league appearances and goals as of 3 January 2026 ‡ National team caps and goals as of 22 March 2024

Cristián Alexander Zavala Briones (born 3 August 1999) is a Chilean professional footballer who plays as a winger for Chilean Primera División club Coquimbo Unido on loan from Colo-Colo.

== Career ==
Born in Puente Alto, Santiago de Chile, Zavala was with CD San Vicente de Pirque as a youth player. At the age of 15, Zavala left the youth academy of Colo-Colo, Chile's most successful team. On 2018, he made his professional debut playing for Coquimbo Unido at the Primera B in a match against Santiago Wanderers.

For the 2020 season, he was sent on loan to Fernández Vial in the Chilean Segunda División from top flight side Coquimbo Unido., but he came back to Coquimbo on November of the same year.

On 2021 season, he joined Deportes Melipilla.

In December 2021, Zavala signed with Colo-Colo. For the 2023 season, he was loaned to Curicó Unido. In the second half of 2025, he was loaned to Coquimbo Unido and won the 2025 league title, the first one for the club. In February 2026, he renewed with Colo-Colo until December 2027 and returned on loan to Coquimbo Unido.

== International career ==
Zavala made his debut for the Chile national team on 9 December 2021 in a 2–2 draw against Mexico.

== Career statistics ==
=== International ===
As of match played 22 March 2024.

Appearances and goals by national team and year
National team	Year	Apps	Goals
Chile	2021	2	0
Chile	2024	1	0
Total		3	0

== Honours ==
Coquimbo Unido

- Primera B (1): 2018
- Chilean Primera División (1): 2025
- Copa de La Liga (1): 2026

Colo-Colo

- Chilean Primera División (2): 2022, 2024
