= Salvador Cordero =

Chilean footballer (born 1996)

Personal information
- Full name: Salvador Eduardo Manuel Cordero
- Date of birth: 11 March 1996 (age 30)
- Place of birth: Antofagasta, Chile
- Height: 1.77 m (5 ft 10 in)
- Positions: Defender; midfielder

Team information
- Current team: Coquimbo Unido

Youth career
- Halcón del Oriente
- Minera Escondida
- 2013–2015: Deportes Antofagasta

Senior career*
Years	Team	Apps	(Gls)
2016–2024	Deportes Antofagasta	179	(4)
2025–	Coquimbo Unido	0	(0)
- * Club domestic league appearances and goals as of 11 December 2024

Salvador Eduardo Manuel Cordero (born 11 March 1996) is a Chilean footballer who plays for Coquimbo Unido. A defender, he can also operate as a midfielder.

== Career ==
Born in Antofagasta, Cordero was with Halcón del Oriente and Minera Escondida before joining Deportes Antofagasta at the age of 17. He made his professional debut with them in 2016 and became the team captain in 2021. He left the team after nine seasons at the end of 2024.

Cordero signed with Coquimbo Unido for the 2025 season. and won the 2025 league title, the first one for the club.

== Honours ==
Coquimbo Unido

- Chilean Primera División: 2025
- Supercopa de Chile: 2026
- Copa de La Liga: 2026
