= Sebastián Galani =

Chilean footballer (born 1997)

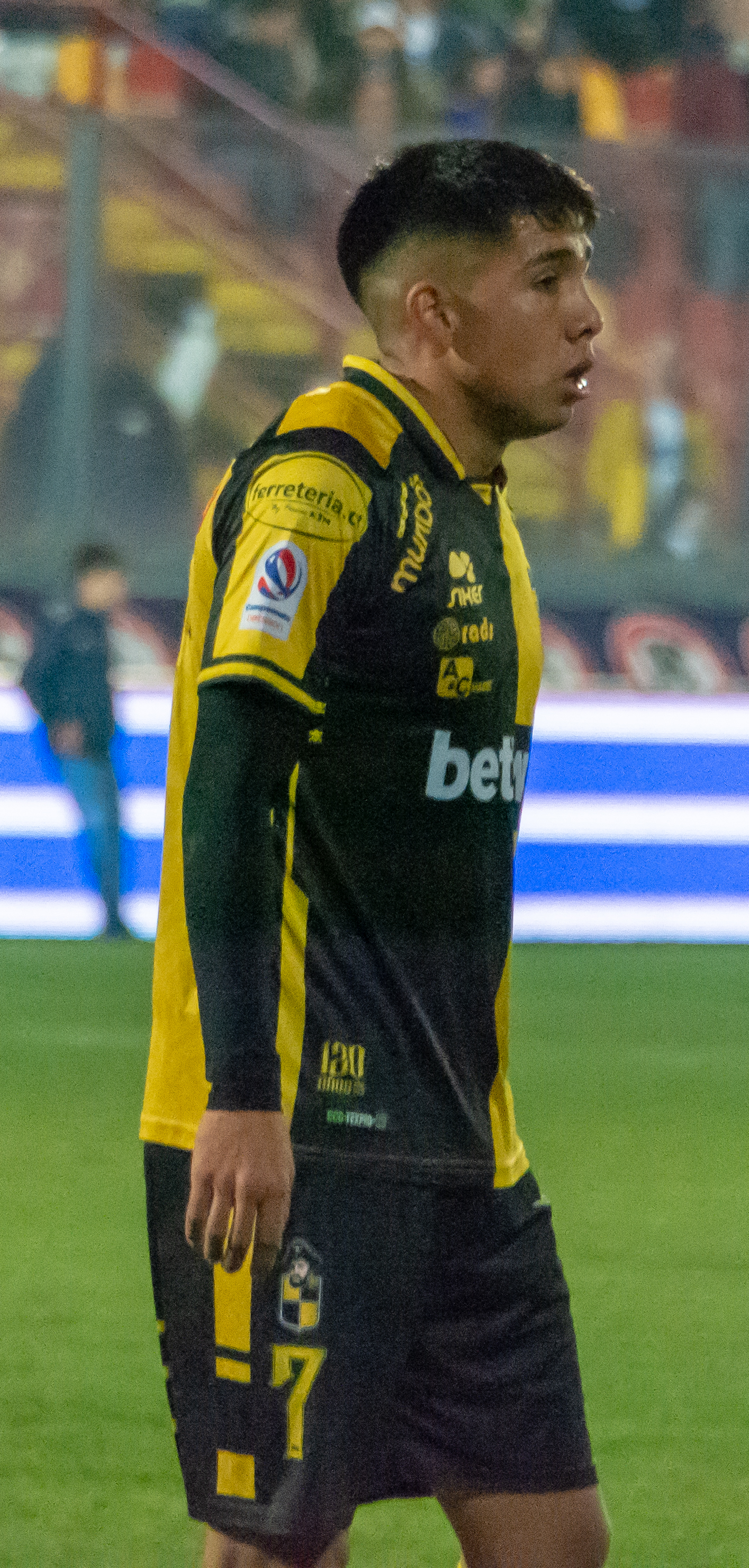
- Galani with Coquimbo Unido in 2023

Personal information
- Full name: Sebastián Paolo Galani Villega
- Date of birth: August 17, 1997 (age 29)
- Place of birth: Coquimbo, Chile
- Height: 1.78 m (5 ft 10 in)
- Position: Midfielder

Team information
- Current team: Coquimbo Unido
- Number: 7

Youth career
- Coquimbo Unido

Senior career*
Years	Team	Apps	(Gls)
2015–2018	Coquimbo Unido	60	(3)
2019–2021	Universidad de Chile	43	(0)
2019	→ Coquimbo Unido (loan)	24	(0)
2022	Universidad Católica	5	(0)
2022–	Coquimbo Unido	43	(0)

International career^{‡}
2019	Chile U23	1	(0)
- * Club domestic league appearances and goals as of 11 January 2024 ‡ National team caps and goals as of 9 September 2019

Sebastián Paolo Galani Villega (born August 17, 1997) is a Chilean footballer who currently plays for Chilean Primera División club Coquimbo Unido as a midfielder.

== Club career ==
=== Coquimbo Unido ===
On 13 August 2016, Galani made his professional debut in a match against Ñublense, playing ninety minutes, accomplishing consistency since the arrival of the coach Patricio Graff on 2017. After Coquimbo Unido won the 2018 Primera B and got promotion to Primera División, he joined to Universidad de Chile along with his teammate Diego Carrasco, but Galani stayed on loan at the pirate team for all 2019 season.

=== Universidad de Chile ===
On 2 January 2020, he was officially presented as Universidad de Chile player for 2020 season.

=== Back to Coquimbo Unido ===
In the second half of 2022, Galani returned to Coquimbo Unido in the Chilean Primera División and won the 2025 league title, the first one for the club.

== International career ==
Galani represented Chile U23 in a friendly match against Brazil U23 on September 9, 2019.

== Career statistics ==
=== Club ===
As of 29 May 2022

Club	Season	League			Cup		Continental		Other		Total	
Club	Season	Division	Apps	Goals	Apps	Goals	Apps	Goals	Apps	Goals	Apps	Goals
Coquimbo Unido	2014-15	Primera B	0	0	0	0	0	0	0	0	0	0
Coquimbo Unido	2015-16	Primera B	0	0	0	0	0	0	0	0	0	0
Coquimbo Unido	2016-17	Primera B	20	0	0	0	0	0	0	0	20	0
Coquimbo Unido	2017	Primera B	11	0	4	0	0	0	0	0	15	0
Coquimbo Unido	2018	Primera B	29	0	1	0	0	0	0	0	30	0
Coquimbo Unido	Total		60	0	5	0	0	0	0	0	65	0
Universidad de Chile	2020	Primera División	21	0	0	0	2 (Note: Appearances in the Copa Libertadores)	0	0	0	23	0
Universidad de Chile	2021	Primera División	22	0	3	0	2	0	0	0	27	0
Universidad de Chile	Total		43	0	3	0	4	0	0	0	50	0
Coquimbo Unido (loan)	2019	Primera División	24	0	2	0	0	0	0	0	26	0
Universidad Católica	2022	Primera División	5	0	0	0	3	0	1 (Note: Appearances in the Supercopa de Chile)	0	9	0
Coquimbo Unido	2022	Primera División	0	0	0	0	0	0	0	0	0	0
Total career			132	0	10	0	7	0	1	0	150	0

== Honours ==
Coquimbo Unido

- Primera B de Chile: 2018
- Chilean Primera División: 2025
- Supercopa de Chile: 2026
- Copa de La Liga: 2026

Individual

- Chilean Primera División Ideal Team: 2025
