= Sebastián Cabrera =

Chilean footballer (born 1998)

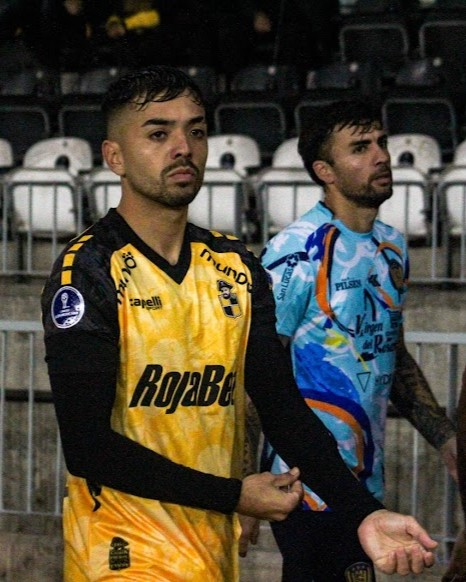
- Cabrera with Coquimbo Unido in 2024

Personal information
- Full name: Sebastián Eduardo Cabrera Morgado
- Date of birth: 16 March 1998 (age 28)
- Place of birth: Coquimbo, Chile
- Height: 1.74 m (5 ft 9 in)
- Position: Left-back

Team information
- Current team: Coquimbo Unido
- Number: 28

Youth career
- Coquimbo Unido
- 2016–2017: → Universidad de Chile (loan)

Senior career*
| Years | Team | Apps | (Gls) |
| 2013–2019 | Coquimbo Unido | 26 | (0) |
| 2016–2017 | → Universidad de Chile (loan) | 0 | (0) |
| 2020–2023 | Palestino | 29 | (0) |
| 2023– | Coquimbo Unido | 0 | (0) |
| 2023 | → Curicó Unido (loan) | 12 | (1) |

International career^{‡}
| 2019 | Chile U23 | 7 | (0) |
- * Club domestic league appearances and goals as of 7 January 2024 ‡ National team caps and goals as of 31 January 2020

Sebastián Eduardo Cabrera Morgado (born 16 March 1998) is a Chilean footballer who plays as a left back for Chilean club Coquimbo Unido.

== Club career ==
Back to Coquimbo Unido from his loan with Curicó Unido in 2023, Cabrera won the 2025 Chilean Primera División, the first one for the club.

== Personal life ==
Cabrera is nicknamed Pichu.

== Career statistics ==
As of 27 September 2020.

| Club | Season | League | | | Cup | | Continental | | Other | | Total | |
| Club | Season | Division | Apps | Goals | Apps | Goals | Apps | Goals | Apps | Goals | Apps | Goals |
|---|---|---|---|---|---|---|---|---|---|---|---|---|
| Coquimbo Unido | 2013–14 | Primera B | 0 | 0 | 0 | 0 | 0 | 0 | 0 | 0 | 0 | 0 |
| Coquimbo Unido | 2014–15 | Primera B | 0 | 0 | 7 | 0 | 0 | 0 | 0 | 0 | 7 | 0 |
| Coquimbo Unido | 2015–16 | Primera B | 2 | 0 | 3 | 0 | 0 | 0 | 0 | 0 | 5 | 0 |
| Coquimbo Unido | 2017–T | Primera B | 0 | 0 | 0 | 0 | 0 | 0 | 0 | 0 | 0 | 0 |
| Coquimbo Unido | 2018 | Primera B | 6 | 0 | 4 | 0 | 0 | 0 | 0 | 0 | 10 | 0 |
| Coquimbo Unido | 2019 | Primera División | 18 | 0 | 0 | 0 | 0 | 0 | 0 | 0 | 18 | 0 |
| Coquimbo Unido | Total | | 26 | 0 | 14 | 0 | 0 | 0 | 0 | 0 | 40 | 0 |
| Universidad de Chile (U19) (loan) | 2016–17 | Primera División | 0 | 0 | 0 | 0 | 0 | 0 | 0 | 0 | 0 | 0 |
| Palestino | 2020 | Primera División | 6 | 0 | 0 | 0 | 1 (Note: Appearances in the Copa Libertadores) | 0 | 0 | 0 | 7 | 0 |
| Career total | | | 32 | 0 | 14 (Note: Appearances in the Copa Chile) | 0 | 1 | 0 | 0 | 0 | 47 | 0 |

=== International ===
As of match played 30 January 2020.

Appearances and goals by national team and year
| National team | Year | Competition | Apps | Goals |
|---|---|---|---|---|
| Chile U23 | 2019 | Maurice Revello Tournament | 3 | 0 |
| Chile U23 | 2020 | Pre-Olympic Tournament | 4 | 0 |
| Chile U23 | Total | | 7 | 0 |
| Total career | | | 7 | 0 |

== Honours ==
Coquimbo Unido

- Primera B: 2018
- Chilean Primera División: 2025
- Supercopa de Chile: 2026
- Copa de La Liga: 2026
