= Luis Riveros =

Paraguayan footballer

Personal information
- Full name: Luis Enrique Riveros Valenzuela
- Date of birth: 24 March 1998 (age 28)
- Place of birth: Isla Umbú, Paraguay
- Height: 1.78 m (5 ft 10 in)
- Position: Forward

Team information
- Current team: Coquimbo Unido
- Number: 27

Youth career
- 2 de Mayo Isla Umbú
- RI 3 Corrales
- 2016–2017: Universidad de Concepción

Senior career*
Years	Team	Apps	(Gls)
2017–2021	Universidad de Concepción	49	(14)
2017	→ Naval (loan)	6	(3)
2020	→ Colchagua (loan)	0	(0)
2020–2021	→ Fernández Vial (loan)	17	(3)
2022–2025	Audax Italiano	59	(11)
2023–2024	→ Cerro Porteño (loan)	15	(1)
2024	→ Tacuary (loan)	17	(1)
2026–	Coquimbo Unido	0	(0)
- * Club domestic league appearances and goals as of 10 December 2025

Luis Enrique Riveros Valenzuela (born 24 March 1998) is a Paraguayan footballer who plays as a forward for Chilean club Coquimbo Unido.

== Career ==
Born in Isla Umbú, Paraguay, Riveros started his career with local club 2 de Mayo and the Pilar city team before joining the RI 3 Corrales youth ranks. In June 2016, he moved to Chile thanks to the former footballer Carlos Guirland and joined Universidad de Concepción. He made his professional debut in the Chilean Primera División match against Universidad de Chile on 1 April 2017.

During his contract with Universidad de Concepción, Riveros was loaned out to Naval in 2017, Colchagua in 2020 and Fernández Vial in 2020–2021.

In 2022, Riveros signed with Audax Italiano. In July 2023, he returned to his homeland by joining Cerro Porteño on a one-year loan with an option to buy. In July 2024, he was loaned out to Tacuary. He returned to Audax Italiano for the 2025 season.

On 30 December 2025, Riveros signed with then Chilean champions, Coquimbo Unido. In January 2026, they won the Supercopa de Chile.

== Honours ==
Fernández Vial

- Segunda División Profesional de Chile: 2020

Coquimbo Unido

- Supercopa de Chile: 2026
- Copa de La Liga: 2026
