= Addha =

Village in Punjab province, Pakistan

Adha is a village in Daska Tehsil, Sialkot District of the Punjab province of Pakistan. It is situated at 32°26′N 74°29′E and lies 18 kilometres (11 mi) from Daska and 8 kilometres (5.0 mi) from Sialkot.
