= Vadala (surname) =

Vadalà, also spelled Vadala or Vadalá when adapted to other languages, is an Italian surname from Reggio Calabria and Sicily, possibly derived from the Arabic theophoric given name ʿAbd Allāh (عبد الله, 'Servant of God'). Notable people with the surname include:

- Eleanor Vadala (1923–2023), American chemist, materials engineer and balloonist
- Giuseppina Vadalà (1824–1914), Italian patriot
- Guido Vadalá (born 1997), Argentine football forward
- Guillermo Vadalá (born 1968), Argentine bass guitarist
- Julia Vadala Taft (1942–2008), U.S. official involved in international humanitarian assistance

== See also ==
- Wadala (surname)
