= Mohra Sandhu =

- Village
- Country: Pakistan
- Province: Punjab (Pakistan)
- District: Rawalpindi
- Time zone: UTC+5 (PST)

Mohra Sandhu is a village situated in the Gujar Khan Tehsil of Rawalpindi District, of Punjab, Pakistan. Its geographical coordinates are 33° 21' 37 North and 73° 25' 40 East and situated in Sui Cheemian Union Council.

Most of the population is Muslim, and belongs to the Sandhu clan of the Jat tribe. The word Mohra Sandhu means the settlement of the Sandhus. They are said to have emigrated from Gujranwala District at the start of the 18th Century.

== See also ==
- Sui Cheemian
