= Jamke Cheema =

- Village and union council
- Country: Pakistan
- Region: Sialkot
- District: Sialkot District
- Tehsil: Daska Tehsil
- Time zone: UTC+5 (PST)
- Postal code: 51020

Jamke Cheema is one of the largest towns and a union council in Daska Tehsil, Sialkot District of Punjab, Pakistan. The town is about 8 kilometres from Daska and is located on the west bank of Marala-Ravi Link Canal.

The town is about 18.9km from Sialkot. The area of Jamke Cheema is 3,963 square acres and the population is 28,603, according to the 2017 census.
