= Shamsa Cheema =

Shamsa Cheema is a village in Daska Tehsil, Sialkot District, Punjab, Pakistan.

== Demographics ==
The population of the village was 1,071, according to the 2017 census.
