= Ralioke =

Village in Punjab, Pakistan

Coordinates: 32°25′N 74°24′E

Ralioke is a village in Sialkot District of the Punjab province of Pakistan. It is located some 6 km from Daska city.
