= Baddoke Cheema =

Baddoke Cheema is a village of Sialkot District in the Punjab province of Pakistan. It is located nearly 10 km away from Daska. It is a Union Council of Sambrial Tehsil, and was previously part of Daska Tehsil. The creek Aaik passes north of this village. The village has one hospital, and a high schools each for boys and girls.
