= Guido Vadalá =

Argentine footballer

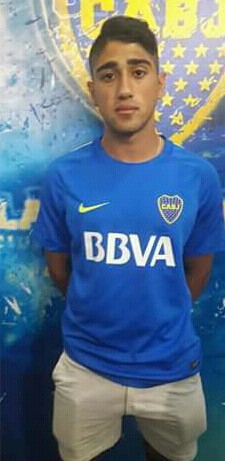
- Vadala with Boca Juniors in 2017.

Personal information
- Full name: Guido Nahuel Vadalà
- Date of birth: 8 February 1997 (age 29)
- Place of birth: Rosario, Argentina
- Height: 1.67 m (5 ft 5 1/2 in)
- Position: Forward

Team information
- Current team: Coquimbo Unido
- Number: 10

Youth career
- Provincial de Rosario
- 2012–2015: Boca Juniors
- 2015–2016: → Juventus (loan)

Senior career*
Years	Team	Apps	(Gls)
2015–2019	Boca Juniors	4	(1)
2015–2016	→ Juventus (loan)	0	(0)
2016–2017	→ Unión Santa Fe (loan)	19	(1)
2018–2019	→ Universidad de Concepción (loan)	15	(1)
2019	→ Deportes Tolima (loan)	3	(0)
2020	Charlotte Independence	10	(0)
2021	Sarmiento de Junín	3	(0)
2022	Mitre SdE	28	(2)
2023–2024	Alvarado	55	(4)
2025	Blooming	27	(10)
2026–	Coquimbo Unido	7	(1)
- * Club domestic league appearances and goals as of 19 March 2026

Guido Nahuel Vadalá (born 8 February 1997) is an Argentine footballer who plays as a forward for Chilean club Coquimbo Unido.

== Career ==
Vadalá began playing football in the Club Atlético Provincial youth system. He was a highly regarded prospect, and made a strong impression while training with FC Barcelona at age 12. He signed his first professional contract with Boca Juniors in 2014. Vadalá made his competitive debut in a Copa Libertadores group stage match in February 2015, before he went on loan to Unión de Santa Fe where he scored one goal in 19 matches.

In December 2024, Vadalá joined Deportes Melipilla for the 2025 Chilean Primera B season. In January 2025, he switched to Bolivian club Blooming.

On 25 December 2025, Vadalá joined the Chilean champions, Coquimbo Unido. In January 2026, they won the Supercopaq de Chile.

== Honours ==
Boca Juniors

- Argentine Primera División: 2017–18

Sarmiento de Junín

- Primera B Nacional: 2020

Coquimbo Unido

- Supercopa de Chile: 2026
- Copa de La Liga: 2026
