= Vadali =

Vadali may refer to the following places in India :

- Vadali, Gujarat
- Vadali State, former princely state in Saurashtra region
- Vadali taluka in Idar (Vidhan Sabha constituency), Sabarkantha District, also in Gujarat

== See also ==
- Vadala (disambiguation)
- Wadali Brothers, Sufi singers from India
