= Wadala Kalan =

- Village
- Location in Punjab, India Wadala Kalan (India)
- Coordinates: 31.362274°N 75.441028°E
- Country: India
- State: Punjab
- District: Kapurthala

Government
  - Type: Panchayati raj (India)
  - Body: Gram panchayat

Population (2011)
  - Total: 1,639
- Sex ratio 822/817♂/♀

Languages
  - Official: Punjabi
  - Other spoken: Hindi
- Time zone: UTC+5:30 (IST)
- PIN: 144601
- Telephone code: 01822
- ISO 3166 code: IN-PB
- Vehicle registration: PB-09
- Website: kapurthala.gov.in

Wadala Kalan is a village in Kapurthala district of Punjab State, India. It is located 7 kilometres (4.3 mi) from Kapurthala, which is both district and sub-district headquarters of Wadala Kalan. The village is administrated by a Sarpanch who is an elected representative of village as per the constitution of India and Panchayati raj (India).

== Demography ==
According to the report published by Census India in 2011, Wadala Kalan has 352 houses with the total population of 1,639 persons of which 822 are male and 817 females. Literacy rate of Wadala Kalan is 81.05%, higher than the state average of 75.84%. The population of children in the age group 0–6 years is 140 which is 8.54% of the total population. Child sex ratio is approximately 867, higher than the state average of 846.

== Population data ==
Particulars	Total	Male	Female
Total No. of Houses	352	-	-
Population	1,639	822	817
Child (0-6)	140	75	65
Schedule Caste	613	308	305
Schedule Tribe	0	0	0
Literacy	81.05 %	87.01 %	75.13 %
Total Workers	624	453	171
Main Worker	449	0	0
Marginal Worker	175	82	93
