= Wadala Granthian =

- Village
- Country: India
- State: Punjab
- District: Gurdaspur
- Tehsil: Batala
- Region: Majha

Government
  - Type: Panchayat raj
  - Body: Gram panchayat

Area
  - Total: 573 ha (1,420 acres)

Population (2011)
  - Total: 4,015; 2,102/1,913 ♂/♀
  - Scheduled Castes: 890; 459/431 ♂/♀
  - Total Households: 774

Languages
  - Official: Punjabi
- Time zone: UTC+5:30 (IST)
- Telephone: 01871
- ISO 3166 code: IN-PB
- Vehicle registration: PB-18
- Website: gurdaspur.nic.in

Wadala Granthian is a village in Batala in Gurdaspur district of Punjab State, India. It is located 8 kilometres (5.0 mi) from sub district headquarter, 30 kilometres (19 mi) from district headquarter and 8 kilometres (5.0 mi) from Sri Hargobindpur. The village is administrated by Sarpanch an elected representative of the village.

== Demography ==
As of 2011, the village has a total number of 774 houses and a population of 4015 of which 2102 are males while 1913 are females. According to the report published by Census India in 2011, out of the total population of the village 890 people are from Schedule Caste and the village does not have any Schedule Tribe population so far.

== Notable people ==
- Ranjit Bawa, a Punjabi singer and actor

== See also ==
- List of villages in India
