= Fernando Burgos =

Chilean footballer (born 1980)

Personal information
- Full name: Fernando Mario Burgos Gallardo
- Date of birth: 17 January 1980 (age 46)
- Place of birth: Santiago, Chile
- Height: 1.83 m (6 ft 0 in)
- Position: Goalkeeper

Youth career
- Universidad Católica

Senior career*
| Years | Team | Apps | (Gls) |
| 1999–2001 | Universidad Católica | 2 | (0) |
| 2002–2003 | Provincial Osorno | 33 | (0) |
| 2004–2006 | Magallanes | 102 | (0) |
| 2007 | Real Potosí | 14 | (0) |
| 2007 | Palestino | 7 | (0) |
| 2008 | Provincial Osorno | 10 | (0) |
| 2010 | Cobresal | 4 | (0) |
| 2011–2016 | Deportes Copiapó | 108 | (0) |
| 2012 | → Curicó Unido (loan) | 14 | (0) |
| 2016–2017 | Colchagua | 29 | (0) |
| Total | | 323 | (0) |
- * Club domestic league appearances and goals

Fernando Mario Burgos Gallardo (born 17 January 1980) is a Chilean former footballer who played as a goalkeeper.

== Honours ==
=== Club ===
Real Potosí

- Torneo Apertura: 2007
