= Wadala Khurd =

- Village
- Location in Punjab, India Wadala Khurd (India)
- Coordinates: 31.368708°N 75.448310°E
- Country: India
- State: Punjab
- District: Kapurthala

Government
  - Type: Panchayati raj (India)
  - Body: Gram panchayat

Population (2011)
  - Total: 516
- Sex ratio 284/232♂/♀

Languages
  - Official: Punjabi
  - Other spoken: Hindi
- Time zone: UTC+5:30 (IST)
- PIN: 144601
- Telephone code: 01822
- ISO 3166 code: IN-PB
- Vehicle registration: PB-09
- Website: kapurthala.gov.in

Wadala Khurd is a village in Kapurthala district of Punjab State, India. It is located 8 kilometres (5.0 mi) from Kapurthala, which serves as both the district and sub-district headquarters for Wadala Khurd. The village is administrated by a Sarpanch, an elected representative.

== Demography ==
According to the 2011 Census India report, Wadala Khurd has 108 houses and a total population of 516 people, comprising 284 males and 232 females. The literacy rate in Wadala Khurd is 81.41%, which is higher than the state average of 75.84%. The population of children aged 0–6 years is 48, accounting for 9.30% of the total population. The child sex ratio is approximately 778, which is lower than the state average of 846.

== Population data ==
Particulars	Total	Male	Female
Total No. of Houses	108	-	-
Population	516	284	232
Child (0-6)	48	27	21
Schedule Caste	87	50	37
Schedule Tribe	0	0	0
Literacy	81.41 %	82.88 %	79.62 %
Total Workers	228	183	45
Main Worker	202	0	0
Marginal Worker	26	9	17
