= Sui Cheemian =

- Village and union council
- Interactive map of Sui Cheemian
- Coordinates: 33°22′12″N 73°25′53″E
- Country: Pakistan
- Province: Punjab
- District: Rawalpindi
- Tehsil: Kallar Syedan

Sui Cheemian, also spelt Sui Chimian, and less commonly as Sui Cheema, is a village in Punjab, Pakistan. It is a Union council of Kallar Syedan Tehsil (a subdivision of Rawalpindi District). Sui Cheemian gets its name from the Cheema tribe of Jats, who make up the majority of the population. They were a warrior clan known for their excellent fighting skill, built physiques and loyalty to their families. The Cheema Jatt tribe are wealthy land owners who were known for their hard working farming and cultural practices.

The village is located at 33.370427,73.431581 with an altitude of 492 metres (1617 feet).

== See also ==
- Lambardar
- Mohra Sandhu
