= 2026 Supercopa de Chile =

Supercopa Lanco 2026
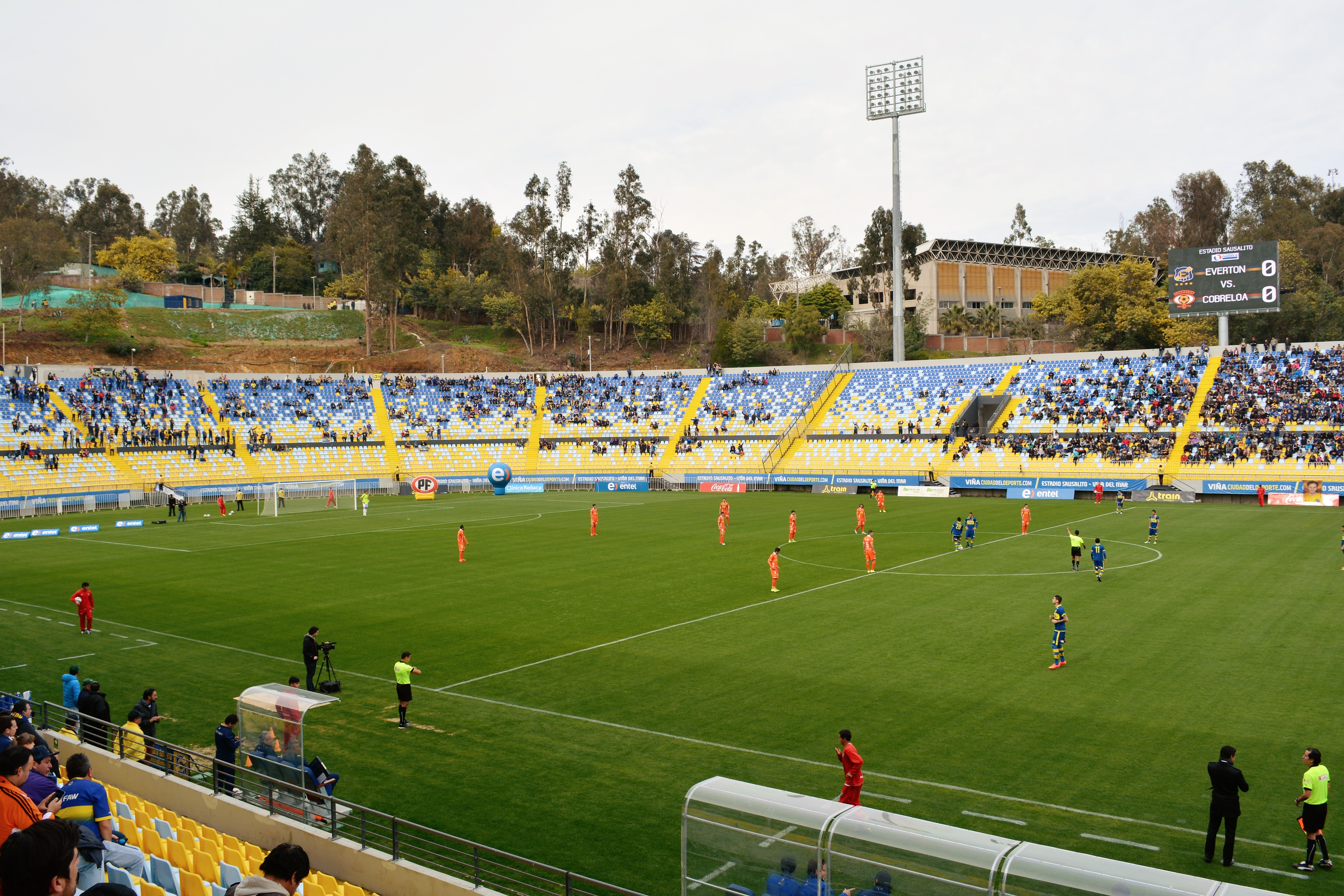
- Estadio Sausalito hosted the competition.

Tournament details
- Host country: Chile
- City: Viña del Mar
- Dates: 20–25 January 2026
- Teams: 4
- Venue: Estadio Sausalito

Final positions
- Champions: Coquimbo Unido (1st title)
- Runners-up: Universidad Católica

Tournament statistics
- Matches played: 3
- Goals scored: 11 (3.67 per match)
- Top scorer(s): Lionel Altamirano; Fernando Zampedri (2 goals each)

The 2026 Supercopa de Chile, known as the Supercopa Lanco 2026 for sponsorship purposes, was the fourteenth edition of the Supercopa de Chile, competition organised by the Asociación Nacional de Fútbol Profesional (ANFP). The competition was held from 20 to 25 January 2026 at Estadio Sausalito in Viña del Mar.

This was the first Supercopa de Chile edition contested by four teams, after an agreement was reached by the ANFP and Warner Bros. Discovery (owners of broadcaster TNT Sports) to expand the competition by involving the champions and runners-up of both the Liga de Primera and the Copa Chile, and changing to a final four format similar to the one used for the Supercopa de España.

Coquimbo Unido were the champions, claiming their first Supercopa de Chile title by defeating Universidad Católica 8–7 on penalties in the final, following a scoreless draw after 90 minutes.

== Teams ==
Following its expansion to four teams, the tournament featured the winners and runners-up of both the 2025 Liga de Primera and the 2025 Copa Chile.

Team	Qualification	Previous appearances (bold indicates winners)
Coquimbo Unido	2025 Liga de Primera champions	None
Huachipato	2025 Copa Chile champions	1 (2024)
Universidad Católica	2025 Liga de Primera runners-up	6 (**2016**, 2017, **2019**, **2020**, **2021**, 2022)
Deportes Limache	2025 Copa Chile runners-up	None

== Matches ==
The semi-final matches were played on 20 and 21 January, and the final was held on 25 January 2026.

=== Bracket ===
Semi-finals
20 January
Huachipato	2
**Universidad Católica**	**4**
21 January
**Coquimbo Unido**	**3**
Deportes Limache	2

Final
25 January
Universidad Católica	0 (7)
**Coquimbo Unido (p)**	**0 (8)**

=== Semi-finals ===
20 January 2026
19:00 UTC−3

Huachipato	2–4	Universidad Católica
Altamirano 40', 67' (pen.)	Report	Zampedri 57', 90'; Montes 74'; Giani 90+6'

Estadio Sausalito, Viña del Mar
Referee: Franco Jiménez

21 January 2026
19:00 UTC−3

Coquimbo Unido	3–2	Deportes Limache
Salinas 8'; Vadalá 72'; Pratto 85' (pen.)	Report	Meneses 20'; Castro 57' (pen.)

Estadio Sausalito, Viña del Mar
Referee: Mathías Riquelme

=== Final ===
25 January 2026
19:00 UTC−3

Universidad Católica	0–0	Coquimbo Unido
	Report
Penalties
Zampedri (penalty scored); Corral (penalty missed); Martínez (penalty scored); Asta-Buruaga (penalty scored); Giani (penalty scored); Farías (penalty scored); González (penalty scored); Mena (penalty missed); Medel (penalty scored); Ampuero (penalty missed)	7–8	(penalty scored) Galani; (penalty missed) Riveros; (penalty scored) Cornejo; (penalty scored) Pratto; (penalty scored) Sánchez; (penalty scored) Cabrera; (penalty scored) Rodríguez; (penalty missed) Salinas; (penalty scored) Hernández; (penalty scored) Camargo

Estadio Sausalito, Viña del Mar
Referee: Cristián Garay

**Universidad Católica**	**Coquimbo Unido**

GK	1	(Chile) Vicente Bernedo
RB	2	(Chile) Daniel González
CB	3	(Chile) Eugenio Mena
CB	19	(Chile) Branco Ampuero	(yellow card) 45+2'
LB	23	(Chile) Tomás Asta-Buruaga
RM	10	(Argentina) Matías Palavecino		(substituted off) 57'
CM	17	(Chile) Gary Medel
LM	20	(Colombia) Jhojan Valencia	(yellow card) 21'	(substituted off) 78'
RW	9	(Chile) Fernando Zampedri (c)	(yellow card) FT
LW	15	(Chile) Cristián Cuevas		(substituted off) 90+5'
CF	11	(Chile) Clemente Montes		(substituted off) 78'
Substitutes:
GK	27	(Chile) Darío Melo
DF	26	(Argentina) Juan Ignacio Díaz
DF	28	(Chile) Bernardo Cerezo
MF	14	(Chile) Jimmy Martínez		(substituted on) 78'
MF	25	(Argentina) Agustín Farías		(substituted on) 90+5'
FW	7	(Argentina) Justo Giani		(substituted on) 57'
FW	18	(Chile) Juan Rossel
FW	30	(Chile) Diego Valencia
FW	35	(Chile) Diego Corral		(substituted on) 78'
Manager:
(Argentina) Daniel Garnero

GK	13	(Chile) Diego Sánchez
RB	2	(Chile) Benjamín Gazzolo	(yellow card) 51'
CB	4	(Argentina) Elvis Hernández
CB	16	(Chile) Juan Cornejo
LB	17	(Chile) Francisco Salinas
RM	7	(Chile) Sebastián Galani (c)
CM	8	(Argentina) Alejandro Camargo
LM	10	(Argentina) Guido Vadalá	(yellow card) 56'	(substituted off) 70'
RW	9	(Argentina) Nicolás Johansen		(substituted off) 70'
LW	30	(Chile) Benjamín Chandía		(substituted off) 86'
CF	20	(Chile) Martín Mundaca		(substituted off) 59'
Substitutes:
GK	21	(Chile) Cristóbal Dorador
DF	5	(Chile) Dylan Escobar
DF	28	(Chile) Sebastián Cabrera		(substituted on) 86'
MF	6	(Argentina) Dylan Glaby
MF	14	(Chile) Salvador Cordero
MF	18	(Chile) Pablo Rodríguez		(substituted on) 70'
FW	12	(Argentina) Lucas Pratto		(substituted on) 70'
FW	27	(Paraguay) Luis Riveros		(substituted on) 59'
FW	31	(Chile) Dixon Pereira
Manager:
(Argentina) Hernán Caputto

Assistant referees:
Diego Gamboa
Felipe Jara
Fourth official:
Nicolás Millas
Video assistant referee:
Gastón Philippe
Assistant video assistant referee:
Alan Sandoval

**Match rules**

- 90 minutes.
- Penalty shoot-out if scores are level.
- Nine named substitutes.
- Maximum of five substitutions.

== See also ==
- 2026 Liga de Primera
- 2026 Copa Chile
- 2026 Copa de la Liga
