= Chima, Santander =

Coordinates: 6.35078°N 73.37116°W

Chima (town)
- Municipality and town
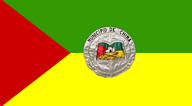
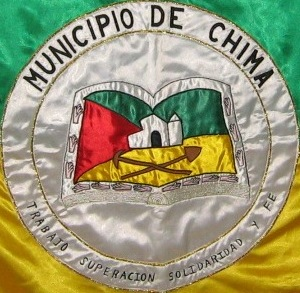
- Flag Seal

- Location of the municipality and town of Chima (town) in the Santander Department of Colombia.
- Country: Colombia
- Department: Santander Department
- Time zone: UTC-5 (Colombia Standard Time)

Chima is a town and municipality in the Santander Department of northeastern Colombia.

== Climate ==
Climate data for Chima (1991–2020)
Month	Jan	Feb	Mar	Apr	May	Jun	Jul	Aug	Sep	Oct	Nov	Dec	Year
Mean daily maximum °C (°F)	31.06 (87.91)	31.6 (88.9)	31.11 (88.00)	30.64 (87.15)	30.21 (86.38)	30.15 (86.27)	30.28 (86.50)	30.54 (86.97)	30.41 (86.74)	29.99 (85.98)	29.71 (85.48)	30.32 (86.58)	30.5 (86.9)
Daily mean °C (°F)	24.13 (75.43)	24.33 (75.79)	24.21 (75.58)	24.02 (75.24)	23.97 (75.15)	23.9 (75.0)	23.8 (74.8)	23.89 (75.00)	23.89 (75.00)	23.81 (74.86)	23.83 (74.89)	24.08 (75.34)	23.99 (75.18)
Mean daily minimum °C (°F)	17.85 (64.13)	18.13 (64.63)	18.25 (64.85)	18.52 (65.34)	18.62 (65.52)	18.31 (64.96)	17.88 (64.18)	17.75 (63.95)	17.95 (64.31)	18.27 (64.89)	18.55 (65.39)	18.37 (65.07)	18.2 (64.8)
Average precipitation mm (inches)	95.28 (3.75)	155.4 (6.12)	268.74 (10.58)	347.36 (13.68)	367.01 (14.45)	191.87 (7.55)	220.31 (8.67)	247.06 (9.73)	294.37 (11.59)	352.1 (13.86)	300.38 (11.83)	166.94 (6.57)	3,006.82 (118.38)
Average precipitation days (≥ 1.0 mm)	8.4	10.64	16.8	19.63	20.37	16.03	16.93	18.59	19.14	20.33	17.85	10.65	195.35
Source: NOAA
