= Wadala Cheema =

- Village
- Location within Pakistan
- Coordinates: 32.410967°N 74.072606°E
- Country: Pakistan
- Province: Punjab
- District: Gujranwala
- Time zone: UTC+5 (PKT)

Wadala Cheema, also known as simply Wadala, is a village located in Gujranwala district in the province of Punjab, Pakistan. It is situated on the bank of the river Chenab.

== Demographics ==
According to the 2017 census, the village population was 7,918.
