= Adamke =

Adamke Cheema
- Location within Pakistan
- Coordinates: 32°23′N 74°21′E
- Country: Pakistan
- Province: Punjab
- Tehsil: Daska
- District: Sialkot District
- Time zone: UTC+5 (PST)
  - Summer (DST): UTC+6 (PDT)
- Area code: 052

Adamke or Adamke Cheema is a village in Sialkot District of Punjab province in Pakistan. The village is located at 32°23'N 74°21'E, nearly 6 km from Daska tehsil headquarter, and closely bordered by nearby localities like Mandranwala and Tajokey Cheema.

== Geography and climate ==
Adamke is cold during winters and hot and humid during summers. May and June are the hottest months. It's quite humid during the rainy season of July and August. The temperature during winter may drop to 0°C. Most of the rain falls during the monsoon season in summer which sometimes results in flooding.

Climate data for Adamke, Pakistan
Month	Jan	Feb	Mar	Apr	May	Jun	Jul	Aug	Sep	Oct	Nov	Dec	Year
Mean daily maximum °C (°F)	18 (64)	21 (69)	26 (78)	33 (91)	39 (102)	40 (104)	35 (95)	33 (91)	34 (93)	32 (89)	26 (78)	20 (68)	29 (84)
Mean daily minimum °C (°F)	5 (41)	8 (46)	12 (53)	18 (64)	23 (73)	26 (78)	26 (78)	25 (77)	23 (73)	17 (62)	10 (50)	5 (41)	16 (60)
Source: Weatherbase
