= Daska Tehsil =

Daska Tehsil تحصیل ڈسکہ تحصیل ڈسکا
- Tehsil
- Country: Pakistan
- Province: (Punjab, Pakistan) Punjab
- District: Sialkot
- Capital: Daska

Government
  - MNA: Syeda Nosheen Shah
  - MPA: Zeshan Mughal

Area
  - Tehsil: 690 km^{2} (270 sq mi)

Population (2023)
  - Tehsil: 980,547
  - Density: 1,400/km^{2} (3,700/sq mi)
  - Urban: 228,626 (23.31%)
  - Rural: 751,921 (76.69%)
- Time zone: UTC+5 (PST)

Daska Tehsil is located in Sialkot District in Punjab, Pakistan. It has a population of approximately 980,547 as of 2023, with Daska city being the administrative center. The tehsil covers an area of 690 square kilometers and has a population density of around 1,421 people per square kilometer. Daska is known for its agricultural significance, with major crops like rice and wheat being grown in the region. The literacy rate in Daska Tehsil is relatively high at 79.19%, reflecting its emphasis on education and development.

== Localities ==
- Bambanwala
- Adamke Cheema
- Kotli Kuppa

== Demographics ==
=== Population ===
Historical population
Year	Pop.	±% p.a.
1951	...	—
1961	...	—
1972	...	—
1981	...	—
1998	605,435	—
2017	847,117	+1.78%
2023	980,547	+2.47%

As of the 2023 census, Daska Tehsil in Sialkot District, Punjab, Pakistan, has a population of 980,547. The urban population of Daska Municipal Committee is 228,626, comprising 116,384 males and 112,190 females. Daska Tehsil covers an area of 690 square kilometers, resulting in a population density of approximately 1,421 people per square kilometer. The literacy rate in Daska Tehsil is 79.19%. For context, Sialkot District, which includes Daska Tehsil, has a total population of 4,499,334 as of 2023.

== See also ==
- Tehsils of Pakistan
  - Tehsils of Punjab, Pakistan
  - Tehsils of Balochistan
  - Tehsils of Khyber Pakhtunkhwa
  - Tehsils of Sindh
  - Tehsils of Azad Kashmir
  - Tehsils of Gilgit-Baltistan
