= 2026 Copa de la Liga (Chile) =

2026 Copa de la Liga Marathon
Tournament details
- Country: Chile
- Dates: 20 March – 14 November 2026
- Teams: 16

Final positions
- Champions: Coquimbo Unido (1st title)
- Runners-up: O'Higgins
- Copa Libertadores: Coquimbo Unido

Tournament statistics
- Matches played: 53
- Goals scored: 143 (2.7 per match)
- Top goal scorer: Luis Riveros (5 goals)

The 2026 Copa de la Liga, known as Copa de la Liga Marathon 2026 for sponsoring purposes, was the first edition of the Chilean Copa de la Liga, a football cup tournament for the 16 clubs participating in the Liga de Primera, organised by the Asociación Nacional de Fútbol Profesional (ANFP). The competition was held from 20 March to 14 November 2026.

The creation of the competition was announced on 14 October 2025, following an agreement reached by the ANFP and Warner Bros. Discovery (owners of broadcaster TNT Sports), after the former was sentenced to pay USD 37 million to the latter in 2024 for breach of contract, owing to a decrease in the number of first division matches played as a result of the 2019 social outburst and the COVID-19 pandemic.

Coquimbo Unido were the champions, after defeating O'Higgins 3–0 in the final. By winning the competition, Coquimbo Unido qualified for the second stage of the 2027 Copa Libertadores as well as the 2027 Supercopa de Chile.

== Format ==
In the group stage, each group was played on a home-and-away round-robin basis. Teams were ranked according to the following criteria: 1. Points (3 points for a win, 1 point for a draw, and 0 points for a loss); 2. Goal difference; 3. Matches won; 4. Goals scored; 5. Away goals scored; 6. Fewest red cards; 7. Fewest yellow cards; 8. Higher seed number. The winners of each group advanced to the semi-finals, which were played on a home-and-away format, while the final was played as a single match on neutral ground.

== Prizes ==
The champion of this edition earned the right to compete in the 2027 Copa Libertadores, taking the Chile 3 berth, provided that they competed in the top flight in the 2027 season. In addition to this, the champions will also be entitled to play the 2027 Supercopa de Chile.

== Schedule ==
The schedule for the competition was as follows:

| Round | Dates |
|---|---|
| Group stage | Matchday 1: 20–23 March 2026; Matchday 2: 24–26 March 2026; Matchday 3: 28 March – 1 April 2026; Matchday 4: 2–4 May 2026; Matchday 5: 9–11 May 2026; Matchday 6: 5–7 June 2026 |
| Semi-finals | First leg: 8–9 July 2026; Second leg: 12 July 2026 |
| Final | 14 November 2026 (originally 18 July 2026) |

== Seeding ==
The groups for the competition were set on 8 January 2026, at the Complejo Deportivo Quilín in Santiago. The 16 teams were seeded according to their position at the end of the 2025 Liga de Primera (shown in parentheses), with the promoted teams from the 2025 Liga de Ascenso replacing the teams relegated from the top flight tournament and being assigned the lowest seeds, and distributed into four groups through the snake draft method.

Group stage draw
| Group A | Group B | Group C | Group D |
|---|---|---|---|
| Coquimbo Unido (1); Colo-Colo (8); Huachipato (9); Deportes Concepción (16) | Universidad Católica (2); Cobresal (7); Ñublense (10); Universidad de Concepción (15) | O'Higgins (3); Palestino (6); Deportes Limache (11); Everton (14) | Universidad de Chile (4); Audax Italiano (5); Unión La Calera (12); Deportes La Serena (13) |

== Group stage ==
=== Group A ===
| Pos | Team | Pld | W | D | L | GF | GA | GD | Pts | Qualification | COQ | CC | HUA | DCO |
|---|---|---|---|---|---|---|---|---|---|---|---|---|---|---|
| 1 | Coquimbo Unido | 6 | 4 | 2 | 0 | 9 | 5 | +4 | 14 | Advance to the semi-finals | — | 1–0 | 2–2 | 2–1 |
| 2 | Colo-Colo | 6 | 3 | 1 | 2 | 8 | 5 | +3 | 10 | | 1–1 | — | 1–0 | 3–1 |
| 3 | Huachipato | 6 | 2 | 2 | 2 | 6 | 6 | 0 | 8 | | 0–1 | 1–0 | — | 2–2 |
| 4 | Deportes Concepción | 6 | 0 | 1 | 5 | 6 | 13 | −7 | 1 | | 1–2 | 1–3 | 0–1 | — |

Source: Campeonato Chileno, Soccerway
Legend: Blue = home team win; Yellow = draw; Red = away team win.
Rules for classification: 1) Points; 2) Goal difference; 3) Matches won; 4) Goals for; 5) Away goals for; 6) Red cards; 7) Yellow cards; 8) Seeding.

=== Group B ===
| Pos | Team | Pld | W | D | L | GF | GA | GD | Pts | Qualification | ÑUB | UC | UDC | CSL |
|---|---|---|---|---|---|---|---|---|---|---|---|---|---|---|
| 1 | Ñublense | 6 | 4 | 2 | 0 | 9 | 3 | +6 | 14 | Advance to the semi-finals | — | 1–0 | 2–1 | 2–0 |
| 2 | Universidad Católica | 6 | 3 | 2 | 1 | 13 | 7 | +6 | 11 | | 1–1 | — | 2–1 | 5–1 |
| 3 | Universidad de Concepción | 6 | 1 | 1 | 4 | 7 | 11 | −4 | 4 | | 0–2 | 2–2 | — | 2–1 |
| 4 | Cobresal | 6 | 1 | 1 | 4 | 6 | 14 | −8 | 4 | | 1–1 | 1–3 | 2–1 | — |

Source: Campeonato Chileno, Soccerway
Legend: Blue = home team win; Yellow = draw; Red = away team win.
Rules for classification: 1) Points; 2) Goal difference; 3) Matches won; 4) Goals for; 5) Away goals for; 6) Red cards; 7) Yellow cards; 8) Seeding.

=== Group C ===
| Pos | Team | Pld | W | D | L | GF | GA | GD | Pts | Qualification | OHI | EVE | LIM | PAL |
|---|---|---|---|---|---|---|---|---|---|---|---|---|---|---|
| 1 | O'Higgins | 6 | 4 | 2 | 0 | 11 | 6 | +5 | 14 | Advance to the semi-finals | — | 2–1 | 1–1 | 2–1 |
| 2 | Everton | 6 | 2 | 1 | 3 | 8 | 9 | −1 | 7 | | 1–2 | — | 1–2 | 2–2 |
| 3 | Deportes Limache | 6 | 1 | 3 | 2 | 7 | 8 | −1 | 6 | | 1–1 | 0–1 | — | 1–1 |
| 4 | Palestino | 6 | 1 | 2 | 3 | 9 | 12 | −3 | 5 | | 1–3 | 1–2 | 3–2 | — |

Source: Campeonato Chileno, Soccerway
Legend: Blue = home team win; Yellow = draw; Red = away team win.
Rules for classification: 1) Points; 2) Goal difference; 3) Matches won; 4) Goals for; 5) Away goals for; 6) Red cards; 7) Yellow cards; 8) Seeding.

=== Group D ===
| Pos | Team | Pld | W | D | L | GF | GA | GD | Pts | Qualification | ULC | AUD | UCH | DLS |
|---|---|---|---|---|---|---|---|---|---|---|---|---|---|---|
| 1 | Unión La Calera | 6 | 4 | 1 | 1 | 7 | 3 | +4 | 13 | Advance to the semi-finals | — | 0–1 | 1–0 | 2–1 |
| 2 | Audax Italiano | 6 | 3 | 2 | 1 | 12 | 9 | +3 | 11 | | 1–1 | — | 1–3 | 3–1 |
| 3 | Universidad de Chile | 6 | 2 | 2 | 2 | 12 | 7 | +5 | 8 | | 0–1 | 2–2 | — | 2–2 |
| 4 | Deportes La Serena | 6 | 0 | 1 | 5 | 6 | 18 | −12 | 1 | | 0–2 | 2–4 | 0–5 | — |

Source: Campeonato Chileno, Soccerway
Legend: Blue = home team win; Yellow = draw; Red = away team win.
Rules for classification: 1) Points; 2) Goal difference; 3) Matches won; 4) Goals for; 5) Away goals for; 6) Red cards; 7) Yellow cards; 8) Seeding.

== Knockout stage ==
=== Bracket ===
Semi-finals
12 | Unión La Calera | 0 | 1 | 1 (4)
1 | Coquimbo Unido (p) | 1 | 0 | 1 (5)
10 | Ñublense | 2 | 0 | 2 (2)
3 | O'Higgins (p) | 1 | 1 | 2 (4)

Final
1 | Coquimbo Unido | 3
3 | O'Higgins | 0

=== Semi-finals ===
The first legs were played on 8 and 9 July, and both second leg matches were played on 12 July 2026.

| Team 1 | Agg. | Team 2 | 1st leg | 2nd leg |
|---|---|---|---|---|
| Unión La Calera | 1–1 (4–5 p) | Coquimbo Unido | 0–1 | 1–0 |
| Ñublense | 2–2 (2–4 p) | O'Higgins | 2–1 | 0–1 |

==== First leg ====
| 8 July 2026 | Unión La Calera | 0–1 | Coquimbo Unido | La Calera |
| 19:00 UTC−4 | | Report | Riveros 30' | Stadium: Municipal Nicolás Chahuán Nazar; Referee: Mathías Riquelme |

| 9 July 2026 | Ñublense | 2–1 | O'Higgins | Chillán |
| 19:00 UTC−4 | Calderón 25'; Jeraldino 90+6' | Report | Yáñez 38' | Stadium: Municipal Nelson Oyarzún Arenas; Referee: Matías Assadi |

==== Second leg ====
| 12 July 2026 | Coquimbo Unido | 0–1 (1–1 agg.) (5–4 p) | Unión La Calera | Coquimbo |
| 15:00 UTC−4 | | Report | Campos López 86' | Stadium: Municipal Francisco Sánchez Rumoroso; Referee: Héctor Jona |
| | Penalties |
| | Galani (penalty scored); Zavala (penalty missed); Cabrera (penalty missed); Pratto (penalty scored); Sánchez (penalty scored); Cordero (penalty scored); Pons (penalty scored) | | (penalty missed) Méndez; (penalty scored) Díaz; (penalty missed) Cruz; (penalty scored) Oyarzo; (penalty scored) Campos López; (penalty scored) Palma; (penalty missed) Gutiérrez |

| 12 July 2026 | O'Higgins | 1–0 (2–2 agg.) (4–2 p) | Ñublense | Rancagua |
| 20:00 UTC−4 | González 68' (pen.) | Report | | Stadium: El Teniente; Referee: Diego Flores |
| | Penalties |
| | González (penalty scored); Castillo (penalty scored); Brizuela (penalty scored); Moreira (penalty missed); Rabello (penalty scored) | | (penalty missed) Reyes; (penalty missed) Valdés; (penalty scored) Graciani; (penalty scored) Campusano |

=== Final ===
The final match, originally scheduled to be held at Estadio Elías Figueroa Brander in Valparaíso on 18 July 2026 at 18:00 local time, was postponed due to bad weather forecasts, with the ANFP proposing 17 October 2026 as a tentative new date for the match.

On 29 September 2026, it was confirmed that local authorities did not give their approval for the match to be played in Valparaíso, leading the ANFP to move it to Claro Arena in Santiago. However, the match was once again postponed due to the mudslides that occurred in the commune of Las Condes (where Claro Arena is located) in the days leading up to the match, as well as the rejection by the Presidential Delegation of the Santiago Metropolitan Region to the ANFP's alternate plan to hold the match at Estadio Santa Laura on safety grounds.

On 23 October 2026, the ANFP eventually confirmed that the match would be played on 14 November 2026 at Estadio Santa Laura.

14 November 2026
18:30 UTC−3

| Coquimbo Unido | 3–0 | O'Higgins |
|---|---|---|
| Riveros 31', 55'; Vadalá 45+3' | Report |

Estadio Santa Laura, Santiago
Referee: Franco Jiménez

== Statistics ==
=== Top scorers ===
| Rank | Player | Club | Goals |
|---|---|---|---|
| 1 | (Paraguay) Luis Riveros | Coquimbo Unido | 5 |
| 2 | (Argentina) Justo Giani | Universidad Católica | 4 |
| 2 | (Chile) Maximiliano Guerrero | Universidad de Chile | 4 |
| 4 | (Chile) Ignacio Fuenzalida | Audax Italiano | 3 |
| 4 | (Chile) Carlo Villanueva | Unión La Calera | 3 |
| 4 | (Chile) Giovanny Ávalos | Ñublense | 3 |
| 4 | (Chile) Michael Vadulli | Audax Italiano | 3 |
| 4 | (Chile) Steffan Pino | Cobresal | 3 |
| 4 | (Argentina) Joaquín Larrivey | Deportes Concepción | 3 |
| 4 | (Chile) Ronnie Fernández | Palestino | 3 |
| 4 | (Uruguay) Alan Medina | Everton | 3 |
| 4 | (Chile) Jeison Fuentealba | Universidad de Concepción | 3 |
| 4 | (Paraguay) Arnaldo Castillo | O'Higgins | 3 |

Source: BeSoccer

=== Hat-tricks ===
| Player | For | Against | Result | Date |
|---|---|---|---|---|
| (Chile) Ignacio Fuenzalida | Audax Italiano | Deportes La Serena | 4–2 (A) | 9 May 2026 |

== See also ==
- 2026 Liga de Primera
- 2026 Copa Chile
- 2026 Supercopa de Chile
