= Copa de la Liga (Chile) =

- Organiser(s): ANFP
- Founded: 14 October 2025; 13 months ago
- Region: Chile
- Teams: 16
- Related competitions: Liga de Primera
- Domestic cup: Supercopa de Chile
- International cup: Copa Libertadores
- Current champions: Coquimbo Unido (1st title)
- Most championships: Coquimbo Unido (1 title)
- Broadcaster: TNT Sports
- 2026 Copa de la Liga

The Copa de la Liga is a Chilean domestic football cup competition organised by the Asociación Nacional de Fútbol Profesional (ANFP), played from 2026 and involving the 16 clubs participating in the Liga de Primera.

The champions will earn the right to compete in the Copa Libertadores, taking the Chile 3 berth, as well as the Supercopa de Chile against the Copa Chile champion and Liga de Primera champions and runners-up.

== History ==
The creation of the competition was announced on 14 October 2025, following an agreement reached by the ANFP and Warner Bros. Discovery (owners of broadcaster TNT Sports), after the former was sentenced to pay USD 37 million to the latter in 2024 for breach of contract, owing to a decrease in the number of first division matches played as a result of the 2019 social outburst and later the COVID-19 pandemic. Furthermore, that same year TNT Sports (formerly known as Canal del Fútbol) was fined USD 28 million by the Court for the Defense of Free Competition for "abuse of dominant position" starting from 2006, when the channel was still owned by the ANFP. Since the clubs were unable to pay the sum of both debts, the ANFP offered to increase the number of matches played per season by creating an additional competition starting from 2026.

== Format ==
The competition is played in three stages: in the group stage, the 16 participating teams are distributed in four groups which will be played on a home-and-away round-robin basis. Teams will be ranked in each group according to the following criteria: 1. Points (3 points for a win, 1 point for a draw, and 0 points for a loss); 2. Goal difference; 3. Goals scored; 4. Fewest red cards; 5. Fewest yellow cards. The winners of each group will advance to the semifinals, which will be played on a home-and-away basis, while the two semi-final winners will play the final match on neutral ground.

== Results ==
Ed.	Year	Winners	Final score	Runners-up	Final venue
1	2026	Coquimbo Unido (1)	3–0	O'Higgins	Estadio Santa Laura, Santiago

== Performance ==
=== Performance by club ===
Club	Titles	Runners-up	Seasons won	Seasons runner-up
Coquimbo Unido	1	0	2026	—
O'Higgins	0	1	—	2026
