= Mario Chirino =

Chilean football manager and player

Personal information
- Full name: Mario Luis Chirino Jiménez
- Place of birth: Chile
- Position: Defender

Senior career*
Years	Team	Apps	(Gls)
1971–1975	Deportes La Serena	72	(1)
1976–1977	Universidad de Chile	22	(0)
1978	Rangers	30	(0)
1979	Ferroviarios		
1980	LD Estudiantil		

International career
1976	Chile U23		

Managerial career
- 1988: Coquimbo Unido
- –2014: Coquimbo Unido (youth)
- 2005: Coquimbo Unido (interim)
- 2008: Coquimbo Unido (interim)
- * Club domestic league appearances and goals

Mario Luis Chirino Jiménez, frequently and wrongly named Mario Chirinos, is a Chilean football manager and former player who played as a defender.

== Career ==
=== As player ===
A football defender, Chirino stood out as a player of Deportes La Serena in the Chilean Primera División in the first half of the 1970s alongside players such as Hugo Valdivia, Juan Koscina, Gregorio Vilches, among others.

In 1976, he switched to Universidad de Chile, playing for them for two seasons. In 1978, he played for Rangers de Talca.

In the Chilean Segunda División, he played for Ferroviarios in 1979.

In 1980, he moved abroad and joined LD Estudiantil in the Ecuadorian second level.

At international level, he represented Chile in the 1976 Pre-Olympic Tournament alongside players such as Nelson Sanhueza, Oscar Wirth, Eduardo Bonvallet, among others, where they reached the fifth place.

=== As coach ===
As a football manager, he has mainly worked for the Coquimbo Unido youth system, taking part of the training of players such as Enzo Guerrero, Carlos Carmona, Alí Manouchehri, among others. He led the first team in 1988. He also assumed as interim coach in 2005 by replacing Raúl Toro in the top level and 2008 by replacing Nelson Cossio in the Primera B. He was released in 2014 and won a work-related lawsuit against the club in the same year.

== Honours ==
=== Player ===
Universidad de Chile

- Pre-Libertadores Mini-League: 1976
