= List of Club Deportivo Universidad Católica managers =

Club Deportivo Universidad Católica is a professional football club based in Santiago, Chile, Chile, which plays in Chilean Primera División. This chronological list comprises all those who have held the position of manager of the first team of Universidad Católica from 1937.

Over the course of its history, the club has been led by more than thirty managers, both Chilean and foreign, who have guided the team through periods of success and adversity. During its professional era, Universidad Católica has appointed more than 50 managers, with Enrique Teuche being the first to hold the position. Chilean coach Alberto Buccicardi, who managed the team for a two-year period, became the first to lead the club to a national championship, securing the 1949 Primera División title.

The longest-serving manager in the history of Universidad Católica is Ignacio Prieto, who led the team across two separate tenures, initially from 1983 to 1990, and later between 1992 and 1994. Prieto is also considered the most successful manager in the club’s history. At the domestic level, he won two Chilean Primera División titles, a Copa Chile and one Copa República. Prieto is also considered the most successful manager in the club’s history.

== List of managers ==
The complete list of Universidad Católica managers is shown in the following table:

Information correct as of the match played on 12 June 2025. Only competitive matches are counted.

Name	Years	Honours
(Chile) Enrique Teuche	1937	
(Hungary) (Chile) Máximo Garay	1938	
(Chile) Alberto Buccicardi	1941-1942	
(Argentina) Antonio De Mare	1943-1946	
(Chile) Alberto Buccicardi	1949	1 Primera División; 1 Copa Apertura
(England) Billy Burnikell	1953-1954	1 Primera División
(Hungary) Jorge Ormos	1956-1957	1 Segunda División
(Argentina) José Manuel Moreno	1957	
(Chile) Alberto Buccicardi	1958-1959	
(Argentina) Miguel Mocciola	1960-1962	1 Primera División
(Chile) Fernando Riera	1963-1966	
(Chile) Andrés Prieto	1966	
(Chile) Luis Vidal	1966	1 Primera División
(Chile) Arturo Quiroz	1967	
(Chile) Fernando Riera	1968	
(Argentina) José Pérez	1969-1973	
(Argentina) (Chile) Néstor Isella	1973	
(Chile) Héctor Ortega	1973	
(Chile) Luis Vera	1974	
(Chile) Jorge Luco	1975	1 Segunda División
(Chile) Alberto Fouillioux	1976	
(Chile) Enrique Jorquera	1976	
(Chile) Arturo Quiroz	1976-1977	
(Chile) Jorge Luco	1977	
(Chile) Orlando Aravena	1978	
(Argentina) (Chile) Néstor Isella	1978-1979	
(Chile) Andrés Prieto	1980	
(Chile) Pedro Morales	1981	
(Chile) Luis Santibáñez	1981-1982	
(Chile) Ignacio Prieto	1983-1990	2 Primera División; 1 Copa Chile; 1 Copa República
(Chile) Fernando Carvallo	1990-1991	
(Argentina) (Chile) Vicente Cantatore	1991-1992	1 Copa Chile
(Chile) Ignacio Prieto	1992-1993	

Name	Years	Honours
(Chile) Manuel Pellegrini	1994-1996	1 Copa Chile; 1 Copa Interamericana
(Chile) Fernando Carvallo	1996-1999	1 Primera División
(Netherlands) Wim Rijsbergen	2000-2001	
(Chile) Juvenal Olmos	2001-2002	1 Primera División
(Chile) Óscar Meneses	2003	
(Argentina) Oscar Garré	2004	
(Chile) Jorge Pellicer	2004-2006	1 Primera División
(Peru) José del Solar	2007	
(Chile) Fernando Carvallo	2007-2008	
(Chile) Mario Lepe	2008	
(Chile) Marco Antonio Figueroa	2009-2010	
(Argentina) (Spain) Juan Antonio Pizzi	2010-2011	1 Primera División
(Chile) Mario Lepe	2011-2012	1 Copa Chile
(Chile) Andrés Romero	2012	
(Uruguay) Martín Lasarte	2012-2013	
(Chile) Rodrigo Astudillo	2014	
(Argentina) Julio César Falcioni	2014	
(Chile) Patricio Ormazábal	2014	
(Chile) Mario Salas	2015-2017	2 Primera División; 1 Supercopa de Chile
(Spain) Beñat San José	2018	1 Primera División
(Argentina) (Bolivia) Gustavo Quinteros	2019	1 Primera División; 1 Supercopa de Chile
(Argentina) Ariel Holan	2020-2021	1 Primera División
(Uruguay) Gustavo Poyet	2021	1 Supercopa de Chile
(Argentina) Cristian Paulucci	2021-2022	1 Primera División; 1 Supercopa de Chile
(Chile) Rodrigo Valenzuela	2022	
(Argentina) Ariel Holan	2022-2023	
(Chile) Rodrigo Valenzuela	2023	
(Chile) Nicolas Núñez	2023-2024	
(Chile) Rodrigo Valenzuela	2024	
(Brazil) Tiago Nunes	2024-2025	
(Chile) Rodrigo Valenzuela	2025	
(Argentina) Daniel Garnero	2025-	

== Trophies ==
Rank	Manager	PD	SD	CdC	SdC	CR	CA	CI	Total	Ref
1	(Chile) Ignacio Prieto	2	–	1	–	1	–	–	4	
2	(Chile) Mario Salas	2	–	–	1	–	–	–	3	
3	(Argentina) Cristian Paulucci	1	–	–	1	–	–	–	2	
3	(Chile) Alberto Buccicardi	1	–	–	–	–	1	–	2	
3	(Chile) Manuel Pellegrini	–	–	1	–	–	–	1	2	
3	(Argentina) (Bolivia) Gustavo Quinteros	1	–	–	1	–	–	–	2	
4	(England) Billy Burnikell	1	–	–	–	–	–	–	1	
4	(Hungary) Jorge Ormos	–	1	–	–	–	–	–	1	
4	(Argentina) Miguel Mocciola	1	–	–	–	–	–	–	1	
4	(Chile) Luis Vidal	1	–	–	–	–	–	–	1	
4	(Chile) Jorge Luco	–	1	–	–	–	–	–	1	
4	(Chile) Vicente Cantatore	–	–	1	–	–	–	–	1	
4	(Chile) Fernando Carvallo	1	–	–	–	–	–	–	1	
4	(Chile) Juvenal Olmos	1	–	–	–	–	–	–	1	
4	(Chile) Jorge Pellicer	1	–	–	–	–	–	–	1	
4	(Argentina) (Spain) Juan Antonio Pizzi	1	–	–	–	–	–	–	1	
4	(Chile) Mario Lepe	–	–	1	–	–	–	–	1	
4	(Spain) Beñat San José	1	–	–	–	–	–	–	1	
4	(Argentina) Ariel Holan	1	–	–	–	–	–	–	1	
4	(Uruguay) Gustavo Poyet	–	–	–	1	–	–	–	1	
