= Chapaleufú Department =

Coordinates: 35.2347°S 63.5919°W

- Department
- Location of Chapaleufú Department within La Pampa Province
- Country: Argentina
- Province: La Pampa
- Capital: Intendente Alvear

Area
  - Total: 2,570 km^{2} (990 sq mi)

Population (2022)
  - Total: 12,334
  - Density: 4.80/km^{2} (12.4/sq mi)
- Time zone: ART

Chapaleufú Department is a department of Argentina in La Pampa Province. The capital city of the department is Intendente Alvear.

== See also ==
- Vértiz
