= Esteban González (Chilean footballer) =

Chilean footballer and manager (born 1982)

Personal information
- Full name: Esteban Eduardo González Herrera
- Date of birth: May 22, 1982 (age 44)
- Place of birth: Santiago, Chile
- Height: 1.73 m (5 ft 8 in)
- Position: Right midfielder

Team information
- Current team: Querétaro (manager)

Senior career*
Years	Team	Apps	(Gls)
2001–2003	Deportes Concepción	51	(1)
2004	Cobreloa	20	(1)
2005	Deportes Concepción	33	(2)
2006	Palestino	21	(0)
2007	Deportes Puerto Montt	27	(11)
2008	Rangers	34	(3)
2009	Ñublense	31	(1)
2010–2011	Unión Española	48	(1)
2012	Universidad de Concepción	23	(0)
2013–2014	Deportes Antofagasta	44	(4)
2014–2015	Huachipato	23	(1)
2015–2016	O'Higgins	8	(0)
2017	Deportes Concepción	9	(1)
Total		372	(26)

Managerial career
- 2018–2020: Deportes Concepción
- 2021–2022: Deportes Concepción (assistant)
- 2022–2024: Coquimbo Unido (assistant)
- 2024: Coquimbo Unido (caretaker)
- 2025: Coquimbo Unido
- 2026–: Querétaro
- * Club domestic league appearances and goals

Esteban Eduardo González Herrera (born 22 May 1982) is a Chilean football manager and former player who played as a midfielder. He is the current manager of Liga MX club Querétaro.

== Club career ==
Chino González began his playing career with Deportes Concepción in 2001. He has also played for Cobreloa, Deportes Concepción, Palestino, Deportes Puerto Montt, Rangers and Ñublense.

In 2004, he was part of the Cobreloa squad that won the Chilean league championship.

He joined Unión Española in January 2010.

=== O'Higgins ===
On 18 June 2015, he joined O'Higgins for the 2014–15 season.

== Managerial career ==
In 2018, González became the manager of Deportes Concepción in the Tercera B, the fifth level of the Chilean football league system. He got promotion on two consecutive occasions in both 2018 and 2019 seasons, leaving the team in November 2020 when it was in the Segunda División Profesional. From 2021 to 2022 he worked as the assistant coach of Óscar del Solar for the same team.

In August 2022, González joined the Coquimbo Unido technical staff as the assistant coach of Fernando Díaz. In April 2024, he led the team in both the national championship and the Copa Sudamericana after Díaz contracted pneumonia.

In 2025, González was confirmed as the head coach of Coquimbo Unido and won the 2025 league title, the first one for the club.

After the last match with Coquimbo Unido, González was appointed as manager of Liga MX club Querétaro.

== Managerial statistics ==
As of 14 November 2026

Managerial record by team and tenure
Team	Nat	From	To	Record							
Team	Nat	From	To	G	W	D	L	GF	GA	GD	Win %
Coquimbo Unido	(Chile)	January 2025	December 2025	40	27	9	4	66	29	+37	67.50
Querétaro FC	(Mexico)	January 2026	Present	36	10	11	15	36	51	−15	27.78
Total				76	37	20	19	102	80	+22	48.68

== Personal life ==
He is nicknamed Chino (Chinese) due to his resemblance with the asian people.

== Honours ==
=== Player ===
Cobreloa

- Primera División de Chile: 2004 Clausura

=== Manager ===
Coquimbo Unido

- Primera División de Chile: 2025

=== Individual ===
- Chilean Primera División Best Manager: 2025
