= Seguel =

Seguel (Spanish pronunciation: [seˈɣel]) is a Spanish surname usually found in Chile and Argentina. Notable people with the surname include:

- Daniela Seguel (born 1992), Chilean tennis player
- Fernando Díaz Seguel (born 1961), Chilean football manager and a former goalkeeper
