= Raúl Toro =

Raúl Toro may refer to:

- Raúl Toro (footballer, born 1911) (1911–1982), Chilean football forward
- Raúl Toro (footballer, born 1954), Chilean football midfielder and manager
- Raúl Toro (footballer, born 1965), Chilean football forward and manager
