= Matías Zepeda =

Chilean footballer (born 2004)

- Zepeda with Coquimbo Unido in 2025

Personal information
- Full name: Matías Andrés Zepeda Flores
- Date of birth: 21 April 2004 (age 22)
- Place of birth: Ovalle, Chile
- Height: 1.72 m (5 ft 8 in)
- Position: Midfielder

Team information
- Current team: Coquimbo Unido
- Number: 23

Youth career
- Manuel Antonio Matta
- Coquimbo Unido

Senior career*
Years	Team	Apps	(Gls)
2024–	Coquimbo Unido	20	(0)
- * Club domestic league appearances and goals as of 16 November 2026

Matías Andrés Zepeda Flores (born 21 April 2004) is a Chilean professional footballer who plays as a midfielder for Coquimbo Unido.

== Club career ==
Originally from Sotaquí, Ovalle, Zepeda was with local club CD Manuel Antonio Matta before joining Coquimbo Unido. He made his debut for the first team of Coquimbo Unido on 6 July 2024, in a 4–0 victory against Cobresal in the Copa Chile semi-finals.

Zepeda scored his first professional goal on 2 February 2025, in a 1–1 draw against Deportes La Serena, in the Coquimbo Region derby, after which he signed a contract with Coquimbo Unido two days later. During that season his club won the Liga de Primera for the first time. The following season, his team won the Supercopa de Chile and the Copa de la Liga.

== Honours ==
Coquimbo Unido

- Liga de Primera: 2025
- Supercopa de Chile: 2026
- Copa de la Liga: 2026
