= Jaime Muñoz =

Chilean footballer

Personal information
- Full name: Jaime Alberto Muñoz Zúñiga
- Date of birth: 3 August 1959 (age 67)
- Place of birth: Los Andes, Chile
- Position: Centre-back

Senior career*
Years	Team	Apps	(Gls)
1982–1988	Deportes La Serena	22+	(0)
1988	Coquimbo Unido		
1989	Cobresal	7	(0)
1990–1994	Coquimbo Unido	100	(2)
1994–1997	Deportes Concepción	74	(1)

Managerial career
- Coquimbo Unido (youth)
- 2009: Coquimbo Unido (interim)
- 2011: Coquimbo Unido (interim)
- 2012: Coquimbo Unido (interim)
- 2013–2014: Deportes Antofagasta (youth)
- 2013–2014: Deportes Antofagasta (assistant)
- 2014: Deportes Antofagasta (interim)
- 2014: Coquimbo Unido
- 2014: Coquimbo Unido (youth)
- 2015: Trasandino (youth)
- * Club domestic league appearances and goals

Jaime Alberto Muñoz Zúñiga (born 3 August 1959) is a Chilean football manager and former player who played as a centre-back.

== Club career ==
A centre-back, Muñoz developed all his career in his homeland playing for Deportes La Serena, Coquimbo Unido, Cobresal and Deportes Concepción.

As a member of Deportes La Serena, Muñoz helped them to get promotion to the Chilean Primera División in the 1983 and the 1987 seasons.

A member of the Coquimbo Unido squad that got promotion to the Chilean Primera División in 1990, Muñoz helped them to become the 1991 Primera División runners-up and took part in the 1992 Copa Libertadores, the first international tournament for the club.

== Coaching career ==
Muñoz has coached and led the youth systems of Coquimbo Unido and Deportes Antofagasta. He assumed as interim manager of the Coquimbo Unido first team in 2009, 2011 and 2012.

As the assistant coach of Gustavo Huerta, Muñoz assumed as interim manager of the Deportes Antofagasta first team in the 2014 Torneo Clausura Primera División. In the 2014 Torneo Apertura Primera B, he assumed as the head coach of Coquimbo Unido, switching to the youth system in October.

In 2015, Muñoz served as coach for the Trasandino youth ranks.
