= Ángel Celoria =

Argentine football manager

Personal information
- Full name: Ángel Enrique Celoria
- Date of birth: 11 February 1944
- Place of birth: Intendente Alvear, Argentina
- Position: Defender

Youth career
- Argentinos Juniors

Senior career*
Years	Team	Apps	(Gls)
	Argentinos Juniors	1	(0)
- Deportivo Morón

Managerial career
- 1970–1974: Chacarita Juniors (youth)
- 1975: San Lorenzo (assistant)
- 1976: San Lorenzo II
- 1980: All Boys
- 1981: Huracán
- 1982: Deportivo Armenio
- 1985-1986: Banfield
- 1988: All Boys
- 1988–1990: Almirante Brown
- 1990: Los Andes
- 1990–1991: Atlanta
- 1992: Quilmes
- 1993–1994: Los Andes
- 1995–1996: Douglas Haig
- 1997: Instituto
- 1999: Coquimbo Unido
- 1999: Cipolletti
- 2000–2005: Hindú Club
- 2005: Deportivo Armenio
- 2007: Sportivo Italiano
- 2007: Rosario Central II
- 2008: Rosario Central (assistant)
- 2008–2009: Boca Juniors (assistant)
- 2008: Boca Juniors (caretaker)
- 2009–2010: Tiro Federal
- 2010–2022: Hindú Club
- * Club domestic league appearances and goals

Ángel Enrique Celoria (born 11 February 1944) is an Argentine football manager and former player who played as a defender.

== Playing career ==
Born in Intendente Alvear, Argentina, Celoria was trained at the Argentinos Juniors youth system. At senior level, he played for them and Deportivo Morón. He retired at the age of 27.

== Managerial career ==
Celoria started coaching the Chacarita Juniors youth ranks in 1970. In 1975, he served as assistant coach in San Lorenzo and coached the reserve team the next year.

As head coach, Celoria started leading All Boys in 1980. The next years, he led several teams in his homeland Huracán, Deportivo Armenio, Banfield, Almirante Brown, Los Andes, Atlanta, Quilmes, Douglas Haig, Instituto, Cipolletti, Deportivo Armenio, Sportivo Italiano and Tiro Federal, his last club at professional level.

Abroad, Celoria had a stint with Coquimbo Unido in the 1999 Primera División of Chile.

Following serving as the assistant coach of Carlos Ischia in Rosario Central and coaching the reserve team, Celoria followed him to Boca Juniors in 2008. On 27 March 2008, he was the caretaker manager in the Copa Libertadores match against Colo-Colo.

Celoria also served as coach and coordinator for Hindú Club for over twenty year since 2000.
