= Instituto Atlético Central Córdoba =

Association football club in Argentina

Instituto
- Full name: Instituto Atlético Central Córdoba
- Nicknames: La Gloria; El Glorioso Cordobés; Albirrojo
- Founded: 8 August 1918; 108 years ago
- Ground: Estadio Juan Domingo Perón
- Capacity: 22,000
- Chairman: Juan Manuel Cavagliatto
- Manager: Diego Flores
- League: Primera División
- 2026: 6th
- Website: institutoacc.com.ar
Home colours	Away colours	Third colours

Instituto Atlético Central Córdoba (commonly referred to as Instituto) is an Argentine sports club from the city of Córdoba, whose professional football team currently plays in the Primera División, the first division of the Argentine football league system.

Famous players who have played at Instituto include Osvaldo Ardiles, Mario Alberto Kempes, José Luis Saldaño, Hugo Curioni, Alberto Beltrán, Raúl Chaparro, Salvador Mastrosimone, Marcelo Bielsa, Ernesto Corti, Diego Klimowicz, Mauricio Caranta, Oscar Dertycia, Alejandro Faurlín, Gonzalo Bergessio, Daniel Jiménez, Paulo Dybala, Ramón Ábila, Silvio Romero.

The basketball team currently plays at Liga Nacional de Básquetbol (LNB), the first division of Liga Nacional de Básquetbol league system.

== History ==
As many other football clubs in Argentina, Instituto was founded by railway workers. The club was initially established in 1918 as Instituto Ferrocarril Central Córdoba. With the re-organization of the administration of the club 6 years later, due to the number of members in the Alta Córdoba neighbourhood, the name was changed to the current Instituto Atlético Central Córdoba.

After its foundation, Instituto quickly reached the first division of the Liga Cordobesa, which the team won in 1925, 1926, 1927 and 1928. With the professionalization of the game in 1931, Instituto lost momentum and sunk into an unsuccessful period. But years later the team revived, conquering the provincial league again in 1961, 1966, and finally in 1972, reaching the Argentine second division.

Instituto played its first ever season at the top level in 1973 where the team finished 8th out of a group of 15 teams, but it had to wait six years to try again. In 1979 Instituto won its group to reach the Quarter-Finals where the club was eliminated 5–3 on aggregate by Club Atlético Tucumán. Instituto also played the Torneo Nacional from 1981 to 1985, and the Metropolitano in 1981, 1982 and 1983. After the reorganisation of 1985 Instituto played all 5 of the long seasons although it was relegated at the end of the 1989–90 season.

The club then had to wait until the 1999–00 season to play in the top flight again. Instituto promoted to Argentine Primera División after winning the 1998–99 Nacional B tournament. Nevertheless, the club would be relegated from the first division the next season, finishing 16th out of 20 teams in the Apertura and 12th in the Clausura, but Instituto was finally relegated after a 2–1 play-off defeat at the hands of Almagro. The club won its second title, the Primera B Nacional 2003 Apertura, and promoted back to first division after getting the revenge over Club Almagro in a 2 legged play-off in 2004. The club survived one season at the top level after winning a two legged promotion/relegation play-off against Huracán by a score of 3–1. In its 2nd season in the first division, Instituto finished 19th overall and was automatically relegated back to B Nacional. The 1986–87 season was probably the most successful season in team's history, having finished 8th overall.

Roberto Castoldi replaced Gastón Defagot as president on 26 August 2019.

== Stadium ==
The club currently plays in Estadio Juan Domingo Perón in which is located in the neighborhood of Alta Cordoba. The origin of its name comes from Juan Perón, President of Argentina during the construction stage. The club has had a number of other homes in their history, all based in the city of Cordoba.

== Players ==
=== Current squad ===
As of 23 September 2026

Note: Flags indicate national team as defined under FIFA eligibility rules; some limited exceptions apply. Players may hold more than one non-FIFA nationality.

No.	Pos.	Nation	Player
2	DF	ARG	Hernán de la Fuente
3	DF	ARG	Diego Sosa
5	MF	ARG	Franco Moyano (on loan from Talleres)
6	DF	ARG	Fernando Alarcón (captain)
7	FW	CHI	Nicolás Guerra
8	FW	ARG	Jonás Acevedo
9	FW	ARG	Facundo Suárez
10	MF	ARG	Alex Luna
11	FW	URU	Matias Fonseca
13	MF	ARG	Juan Ignacio Méndez (on loan from Newell's Old Boys)
14	MF	PAR	Wilder Viera
15	MF	ARG	Matías Gallardo
17	FW	ARG	Matías Tissera
19	FW	URU	Lucas Sanseviero (on loan from Valladolid)

No.	Pos.	Nation	Player
20	FW	COL	Jhon Córdoba
21	MF	ARG	Jeremías Lázaro
22	DF	ARG	Agustín Massaccesi
23	DF	ARG	Andrés Meli
25	FW	ARG	Lorenzo Albarracín
26	DF	ARG	Leonel Mosevich (on loan from Argentinos Juniors)
29	GK	ARG	Marcos Ledesma (on loan from Defensa y Justicia)
30	DF	ARG	Jonatan Galván (on loan from Argentinos Juniors)
32	DF	ARG	Agustín Bravo (on loan from Rosario Central)
35	GK	ARG	Emanuel Sittaro
44	DF	ARG	Giuliano Cerato
55	MF	ARG	Gustavo Abregú
61	MF	ARG	Joaquín Medina
72	FW	ARG	Luca Rafaelli

=== Reserve squad ===
Note: Flags indicate national team as defined under FIFA eligibility rules; some limited exceptions apply. Players may hold more than one non-FIFA nationality.

No.	Pos.	Nation	Player
40	GK	ARG	Gerardo Larraya
70	DF	ARG	Genaro Ordóñez

No.	Pos.	Nation	Player
80	FW	ARG	Benjamín Olmedo

=== Out on loan ===
Note: Flags indicate national team as defined under FIFA eligibility rules; some limited exceptions apply. Players may hold more than one non-FIFA nationality.

No.	Pos.	Nation	Player
17	MF	ARG	Leonardo Monje (at San Martín SJ until 31 December 2026)
27	MF	ARG	Nicolás Watson (at Deportivo Riestra until 31 December 2026)
31	DF	ARG	Gonzalo Requena (at Krylia Sovetov until 31 December 2026)

No.	Pos.	Nation	Player
32	FW	ARG	Jonathan Dellarossa (at Defensores de Belgrano until 31 December 2026)
42	DF	ARG	Lautaro Carrera (at Gimnasia-M until 30 June 2026)
77	FW	ARG	Luca Klimowicz (at Emelec until 31 December 2026)

== Managers ==
- 1973: Enrique García
- 1979–81: Alfio Basile
- 1982: Sebastián Viberti
- 1983–84: Oscar Ceders
- 1985–87: Carlos Montes
- 1988: Mario Zanabria
- 1988–89: Jorge Domichi
- 1990: René Arregui
- 1990–91: Raúl Arraigada
- 1991–93: Salvador Ragusa
- 1993: Raúl Arraigada
- 1994: Jorge Ginarte
- 1995: Carlos Biasutto
- 1995–96: Jorge Luis Ghiso
- 1996: Horacio Bongiovanni
- 1997: Ramón Adorno
- 1997: Ángel Celoria
- 1997–98: Juan José López
- 1999–00: Ernesto Corti
- 2000: Juan José López
- 2000–01: Gerardo Martino
- 2001–02: Ernesto Corti
- 2002: Carlos Compagnucci
- 2002–04: Héctor Rivoira
- 2004: Ricardo Rezza
- 2005: Luis Garisto
- 2005: Fernando Quiroz
- 2005: Jorge Theiler
- 2005: Ramón Alvarez (Interim)
- 2006: Ariel Cuffaro Russo
- 2006: Ramon Alvarez & Sergio González (Interim)
- 2006: Fernando Quiroz
- 2006–07: Eduardo Anzarda
- 2007: Héctor Rivoira
- 2007–09: Jorge Luis Ghiso
- 2009–10: Marcelo Bonetto
- 2010–11: Claudio Vivas
- 2011: Ramon Alvarez & Alberto Beltrán (Interim)
- 2011–12: Darío Franco
- 2012: Leonardo Nadaya & Elvio Agüero (Interim)
- 2012–13: Frank Darío Kudelka
- 2013–14: Elvio Agüero (Interim)
- 2014: Daniel Jiménez
- 2014–15: Carlos Mazzola
- 2015–16: Héctor Rivoira
- 2016–17: Iván Delfino
- 2017: Claudio Demaria (Interim)
- 2017: Gabriel Gómez
- 2017–18: Darío Franco
- 2018: César Zabala
- 2018–19: Diego Cagna
- 2019–20: César Zabala
- 2020–21: Fernando Quiroz
- 2021: Mauricio Caranta
- 2021: Marcelo Vázquez
- 2021: Claudio Sarría & Daniel Jiménez (Interim)
- 2022–23: Lucas Bovaglio
- 2023–24: Diego Dabove
- 2024: Bruno Martelotto (Interim)
- 2025: Pedro Troglio
- 2025: Bruno Martelotto (Interim)
- 2025–26: Daniel Oldrá
- 2026: Bruno Martelotto (Interim)
- 2026–: Diego Flores

== Honours ==
=== National ===
- Primera B Nacional
  - Winners (2): 1998–99, 2003–04

=== Regional ===
- Liga Cordobesa de Fútbol
  - Winners (9): 1925, 1926, 1927, 1928, 1961, 1966, 1972, 1990, 2017
- Liga Cordobesa Segunda División
  - Winners (4): 1919, 1920, 1941, 1946

== Basketball ==
Apart from football, Instituto has a basketball section from which its senior team is currently competing in Liga Nacional de Básquet, the top division of the Argentine basketball league system. Instituto won its first major title in 2021–22 after beating Quimsa 3–2 in the finals. The team, coached by Lucas Victoriano, became the second club from Córdoba to win the LNB after Atenas, which is also the most winning team with 9 titles.

== Education ==
Apart from sports, Instituto has its own primary and secondary school in Alta Córdoba neighbourhood. The school has sport orientation through which it promotes values and quality education.
