= Ramón Climent (footballer, born 1929) =

Chilean football manager and player

- Climent in 1950

Personal information
- Full name: Ramón Juan Climent Morales
- Date of birth: 7 September 1929
- Place of birth: Quinta Normal, Santiago, Chile
- Date of death: 4 December 2003 (aged 74)
- Place of death: Chile
- Position: Midfielder

Youth career
- Unión Florida
- Iberia

Senior career*
Years	Team	Apps	(Gls)
1949	Bádminton		
1950–1955	Ferrobádminton		
1956–1957	Rangers		
1958–1959	Palestino		
1960–1962	Selección Schwager		
1963	Selección Lota		

International career
1956	Chile	2	(0)

Managerial career
- 1967: Lister Rossel
- 1973–1975: Everton
- 1976: Ñublense
- 1977: Coquimbo Unido
- 1978: Rangers
- 1979: Coquimbo Unido
- 1979: Deportes La Serena
- 1982–1983: Regional Atacama
- 1985: Green Cross-Temuco
- 1985: Lota Schwager
- 1988: Audax Italiano
- 1988–1989: Lota Schwager
- 1990: Coquimbo Unido
- 1992: Colchagua
- 1993: Deportes Puerto Montt
- * Club domestic league appearances and goals

Ramón Juan Climent Morales (7 September 1929 – 4 December 2003) was a Chilean football manager and player who played as a midfielder.

== Playing career ==
Born in Santiago, Chile, Climent was with Unión Florida from Quinta Normal commune and Iberia from Santiago as a youth player. After reinforcing the football team of Chilean Air Force Cadets as a Chilean Army conscript, he joined Bádminton in 1949, his first club at professional level.

Following Bádminton, Climent played for Ferrobádminton, Rangers and Palestino in the Chilean Primera División. He also represented the town teams of both Schwager and Lota.

At international level, Climent made two appearances for Chile at the 1956 Panamerican Championship.

== Managerial career ==
With an extensive career in his homeland, Climent led clubs such as Lister Rossel, Everton, Ñublense, Coquimbo Unido, Green Cross-Temuco, Lota Schwager, among others.

He won the Chilean Segunda División with Everton in 1974 and Coquimbo Unido in 1977.

== Personal life ==
His father was Spanish and served as a football leader for clubs in Quinta Normal. His older brother also played football at amateur level.
