= Raúl Pino =

Chilean football manager (1925–2002)

Personal information
- Full name: Raúl Mariano Pino Terán
- Date of birth: 17 October 1925
- Place of birth: Curicó, Chile
- Date of death: 30 July 2002 (aged 76)
- Place of death: Santa Cruz de la Sierra, Bolivia

Youth career
- Universidad de Chile

Senior career*
Years	Team	Apps	(Gls)
1944–1945	Universidad de Chile		

Managerial career
- Universidad de Chile (assistant)
- 1963: Chile (amateur)
- 1963: Green Cross
- 1964: Transandino
- 1965: Magallanes
- 1965: Coquimbo Unido
- 1966: Unión La Calera
- 1967–1968: Coquimbo Unido
- 1969–1971: Everton
- 1971–1972: Chile
- 1973: Naval
- 1974: Regional Antofagasta
- 1975–1976: Jorge Wilstermann
- 1976: Naval
- 1977: Regional Antofagasta
- 1978: Trasandino
- 1980–1982: Jorge Wilstermann
- 1983–1985: Blooming
- 1985: Bolivia
- 1986: Jorge Wilstermann
- 1987: Oriente Petrolero
- 1988: Destroyers
- 1989: Always Ready
- 1990: Blooming
- 1991–1992: San José
- 1993–1994: Real Santa Cruz
- 1995–1998: Universidad Cruceña
- * Club domestic league appearances and goals

Raúl Mariano Pino Terán (17 October 1925 – 30 July 2002) was a Chilean football manager who worked in Chile and Bolivia.

== Career ==
As a football player, Pino was a product of Universidad de Chile youth system, and left football at the age of 19 due to a serious achilles tendon injury. Then, he had an extensive career as manager in his country of birth and Bolivia.

=== In Chile ===
As a football coach, Pino began working as an assistant in Universidad de Chile. In the Segunda División he coached Green Cross, winning the 1963 league, Trasandino and Coquimbo Unido. In the Chilean Primera División he coached Magallanes, Unión La Calera, Everton, Naval and Regional Antofagasta

=== In Bolivia ===
Pino came to Bolivia to coach Jorge Wilstermann in 1975. He also coached Blooming, Oriente Petrolero, Destroyers, Always Ready, San José, Real Santa Cruz, winning the 1993 Copa Simón Bolívar, and Universidad Cruceña.

He won the Bolivian Primera División three times: with Jorge Wilstermann in 1980 and 1981 and with Blooming in 1984.

=== National team ===
Pino led the Chile national amateur team in the 1963 Pan American Games.

In 1971, he coached the Chile national team in nine friendly matches along with Luis Vera, winning both the Copa Juan Pinto Durán and the Copa del Pacífico 1971. In 1972, he went on in charge without Vera, coaching Chile in four friendly matches.

In 1985, he assumed as coach of the Bolivia national team for two months, leading the team in 6 matches, including the 1986 FIFA World Cup qualifiers.

== Personal life ==
Pino had two children, Lorena and Iván, along with his wife Aurora.

He was nicknamed El Mago (The Magician), due to the fact that he had notable achievements.

In July 2002, before he died, both the Bolivian Football Federation and the Bolivian Football Managers Association made a ceremony in honor of Pino and his career.

== Honours ==
Green Cross

- Segunda División de Chile: 1963

Jorge Wilstermann

- Asociación de Fútbol Cochabamba: 1975, 1976
- Bolivian Primera División: 1980, 1981

Blooming

- Bolivian Primera División: 1984

Real Santa Cruz

- Copa Simón Bolívar: 1993

Chile (along with Luis Vera)

- Copa Juan Pinto Durán: 1971
- Copa del Pacífico: 1971
