= Alejandro Azócar =

Chilean footballer (born 2000)

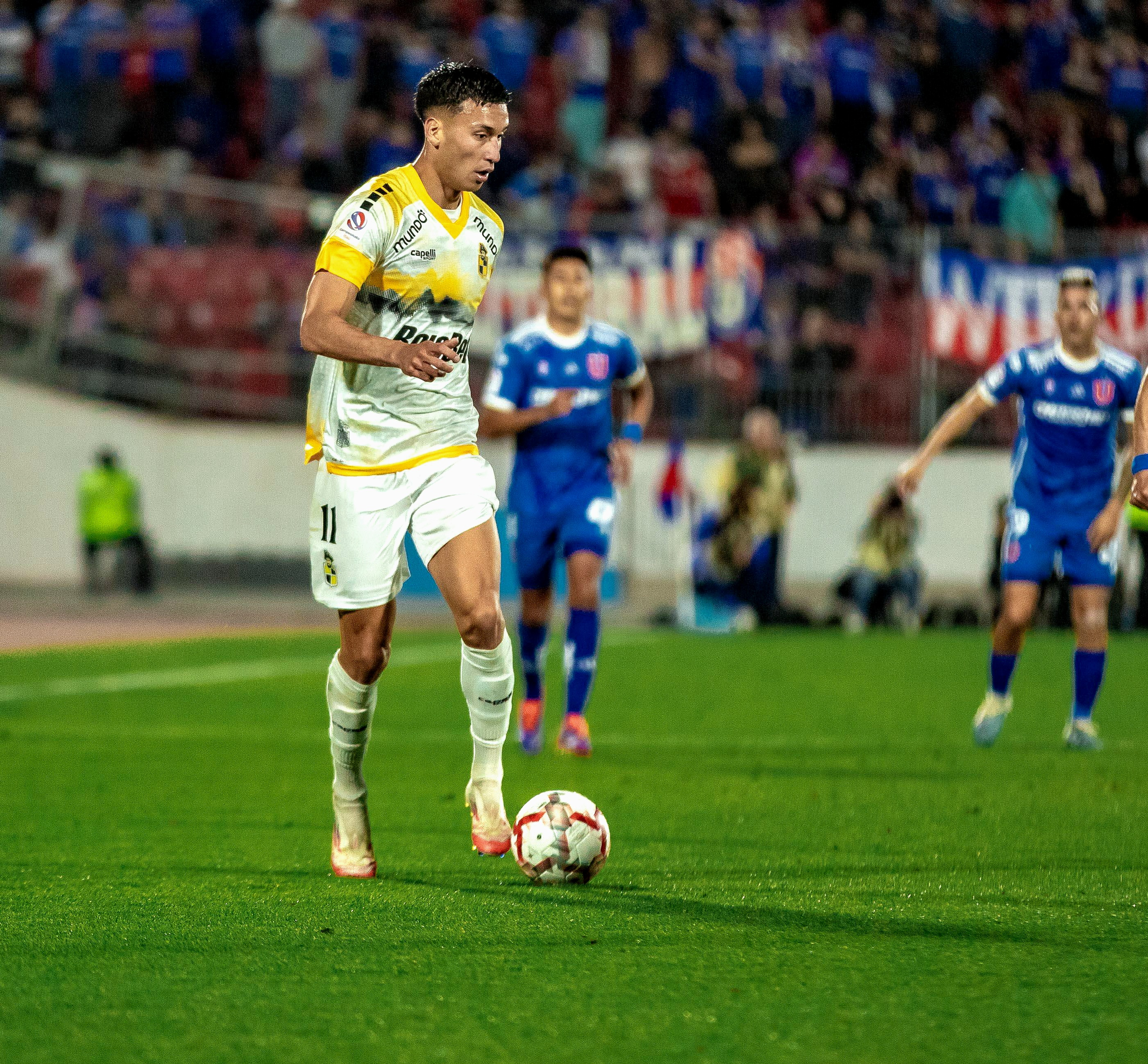
- Azócar with Coquimbo Unido in 2024.

Personal information
- Full name: Alejandro Esteban Azócar Machuca
- Date of birth: 19 October 2000 (age 26)
- Place of birth: Los Andes, Chile
- Height: 1.80 m (5 ft 11 in)
- Position: Winger

Team information
- Current team: Coquimbo Unido
- Number: 11

Youth career
- Villa Manuel Rodríguez
- Santiago Wanderers

Senior career*
Years	Team	Apps	(Gls)
2020–2023	Unión San Felipe	37	(2)
2022–2023	→ San Marcos (loan)	40	(4)
2024	San Marcos	0	(0)
2024	→ Coquimbo Unido (loan)	30	(3)
2025–	Coquimbo Unido	0	(0)
- * Club domestic league appearances and goals as of 20 October 2024

Alejandro Esteban Azócar Machuca (born 19 October 2000) is a Chilean professional footballer who plays as a winger for Chilean Primera División side Coquimbo Unido.

== Career ==
As a youth player, Azócar was with CD Villa Manuel Rodríguez.

A product of Santiago Wanderers, Azócar started his senior career with Unión San Felipe and made his debut in a match against Rangers de Talca on 25 February 2020.

In 2022, he was loaned out to San Marcos de Arica, winning the Segunda División Profesional. He renewed with them for the 2023 season.

In 2024, Azócar moved on loan to Coquimbo Unido in the Chilean top level, with whom he competed at the 2024 Copa Sudamericana, making four appearances. He renewed with them for the 2025 season and won the 2025 league title, the first one for the club.

== International career ==
In 2023, Azócar was called up to training microcycles of the Chile under-23 national team under Eduardo Berizzo with views to the 2023 Pan American Games.

== Honours ==
San Marcos de Arica

- Segunda División Profesional de Chile: 2022

Coquimbo Unido

- Chilean Primera División: 2025
- Supercopa de Chile: 2026
- Copa de La Liga: 2026
