= Coquimbo Unido =

Chilean football club based in Coquimbo

- Full name: Club de Deportes Coquimbo Unido
- Nicknames: Piratas (Pirates); Aurinegros (Gold and Black); El Barbón (The Beardy Man)
- Founded: 30 August 1958; 68 years ago
- Ground: Francisco Sánchez Rumoroso; Coquimbo, Chile
- Capacity: 18,750
- Chairman: Jorge Contador
- Manager: Hernán Caputto
- League: Liga de Primera
- 2025: Liga de Primera, 1st of 16
- Website: www.tiendapirata.cl
Home colours	Away colours	Third colours

Coquimbo Unido is a Chilean professional football club based in the port city of Coquimbo, Coquimbo Region. Founded on 30 August 1958, the club currently competes in the Primera División, the highest tier of Chilean football. After being relegated in 2020, Coquimbo won the Primera B championship in 2021 and returned to the top flight for the 2022 season.

The club plays its home matches at the Estadio Municipal Francisco Sánchez Rumoroso, its traditional home ground in Coquimbo, which has a capacity of approximately 18,750 spectators. Coquimbo Unido's traditional colours are yellow and black, from which the club derives the nickname Aurinegros. It is also widely known as the Piratas (Pirates), an identity closely associated with the maritime history and culture of the port of Coquimbo.

The club's badge reflects this identity and features an illustration of English privateer Bartholomew Sharp, who sailed along the Pacific coast of South America during the late 17th century. The pirate symbolism has become one of the most distinctive elements of the club's identity and is widely used in its imagery, nicknames and supporter culture.

Coquimbo Unido has spent much of its history between the first and second tiers of Chilean football. The club won the second-tier championship in 1962, 1977 and 2021, and finished runner-up in the Primera División in 1991 and the 2005 Apertura. Its 1991 campaign led to its first international appearance in the 1992 Copa Libertadores, while in the 2020 Copa Sudamericana the club achieved its best continental performance by reaching the semi-finals.

In 2025, Coquimbo Unido won the Primera División for the first time in its history, securing the championship with four matches remaining after a 2–0 victory over Unión La Calera. The title made the club the first team from the Coquimbo Region to become Chilean top-flight champions.

== History ==
=== Early years: 1958–1990 ===
Coquimbo Unido was founded on 30 August 1958 in the port city of Coquimbo, following the consolidation of local football organizations that sought to establish a professional representative for the city. The club's statutes had been approved earlier that year, while its legal constitution was formalized through a public deed on 30 August. In February 1959, the Asociación Central de Fútbol approved Coquimbo Unido's admission to professional football.

After several seasons in the second tier, Coquimbo won the Segunda División championship in 1962 and earned its first promotion to the Primera División, making its top-flight debut in 1963. The club subsequently alternated between the first and second divisions, winning another second-tier championship in 1977.

Following another period outside the top flight, Coquimbo finished runner-up in the 1990 Segunda División and secured promotion for the 1991 season. This return marked the beginning of one of the most successful periods in the club's history.

=== First international era ===
Under manager José Sulantay, Coquimbo Unido produced its best league campaign to that point in 1991, finishing second in the Primera División behind Colo-Colo. The result qualified the club for the 1992 Copa Libertadores, becoming the first team from the Coquimbo Region to participate in the competition. In the Libertadores, Coquimbo shared a group with Colo-Colo, Universidad Católica, San Lorenzo de Almagro and Newell's Old Boys, but was eliminated in the group stage.

Coquimbo remained in Primera División throughout the 1990s and early 2000s. Another major opportunity came in the 2005 Apertura, when the team, coached by Raúl Toro, reached the championship final after eliminating Huachipato in the semi-finals. Coquimbo faced Unión Española in the final, losing the first leg 1–0 and the return match 3–2 at the Estadio Francisco Sánchez Rumoroso, finishing as tournament runner-up.

The long spell in the top division ended in 2007. After sixteen consecutive seasons in Primera División, Coquimbo was relegated following a difficult Apertura and Clausura campaign.

=== Primera B and return ===
Coquimbo spent the following eleven seasons in Primera B, repeatedly coming close to promotion. In 2008, the club won the Clausura tournament but lost the subsequent promotion series, first against Deportes Iquique and later against Universidad de Concepción. In 2014, Coquimbo again won a Clausura competition, but was eliminated by San Luis de Quillota on penalties in the promotion play-offs.

The club endured one of its most difficult seasons in 2015–16, beginning the campaign with seventeen matches without a victory and entering the final round in danger of relegation to the third tier. A 4–2 victory over Barnechea ultimately preserved its Primera B status.

The breakthrough came in 2018 under Argentine manager Patricio Graff. Coquimbo led the championship from the second half of the season and secured the Primera B title with a 1–0 victory over Deportes Puerto Montt at a sold-out Estadio Francisco Sánchez Rumoroso. The team finished with 57 points and returned to Primera División after an eleven-year absence.

=== Continental success ===
Coquimbo established itself quickly after returning to the top flight. Its 2019 league campaign earned qualification for the 2020 Copa Sudamericana, marking the club's first international appearance since the 1992 Copa Libertadores.

The 2020 Copa Sudamericana became the most successful international campaign in the club's history. Coquimbo eliminated Aragua, Estudiantes de Mérida, Sport Huancayo and Junior to reach the semi-finals. In the semi-final, Coquimbo drew 0–0 with eventual champions Defensa y Justicia in the first leg before losing the return match 4–2 in Argentina.

The continental success contrasted sharply with the domestic campaign. A congested schedule and poor league results left Coquimbo at the bottom of the 2020 Primera División standings, and the club was relegated to Primera B at the end of the season.

The stay in the second tier lasted only one year. Coached by Héctor Tapia, and with a squad that included Esteban Paredes, Jean Beausejour and Carlos Carmona, Coquimbo won the 2021 Primera B championship. A 2–1 victory over Fernández Vial on the final matchday secured the title with 55 points and an immediate return to Primera División.

=== First league title ===
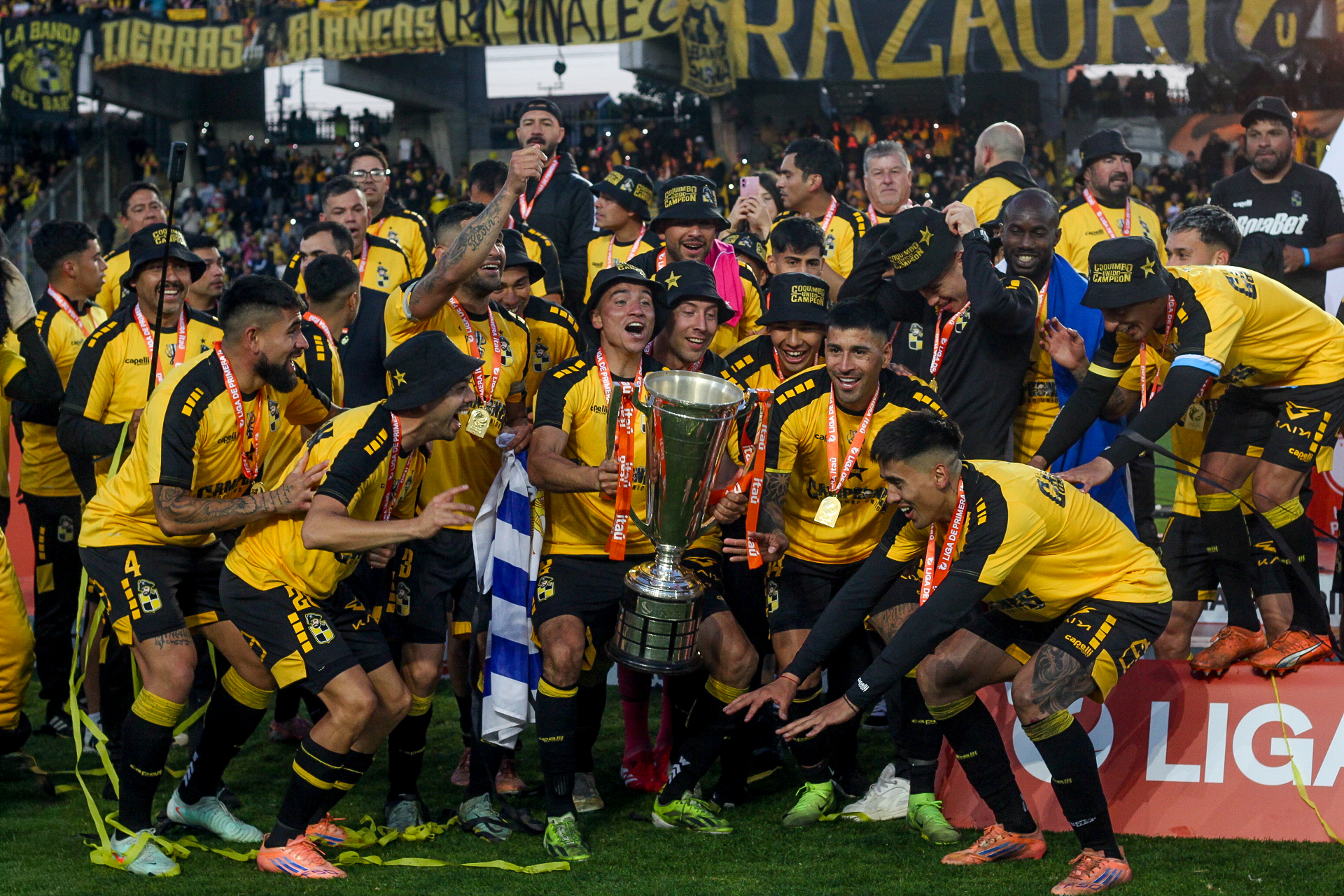
The 2025 Liga de Primera winning team.

After narrowly avoiding another relegation in 2022, Coquimbo gradually re-established itself in the upper half of the Primera División. A strong 2023 season secured qualification for the 2024 Copa Sudamericana, where the club returned to continental competition and faced teams including Racing Club and Red Bull Bragantino.

The club reached a historic peak in 2025 under manager Esteban González. Coquimbo emerged as the dominant team of the Primera División, producing a fourteen-match winning streak during the campaign. On 2 November, a 2–0 home victory over Unión La Calera made the club mathematically unreachable with four matches remaining and secured the first top-flight championship in its history. Coquimbo completed the season with 75 points from 30 matches, recording 23 victories, six draws and only one defeat.

The championship also made Coquimbo Unido the first club from the Coquimbo Region to win the Chilean Primera División. The success continued at the beginning of 2026, when the club won the Supercopa de Chile for the first time, defeating Universidad Católica in a penalty shoot-out in the final and adding a second major top-level trophy to its honours.

== Stadium ==
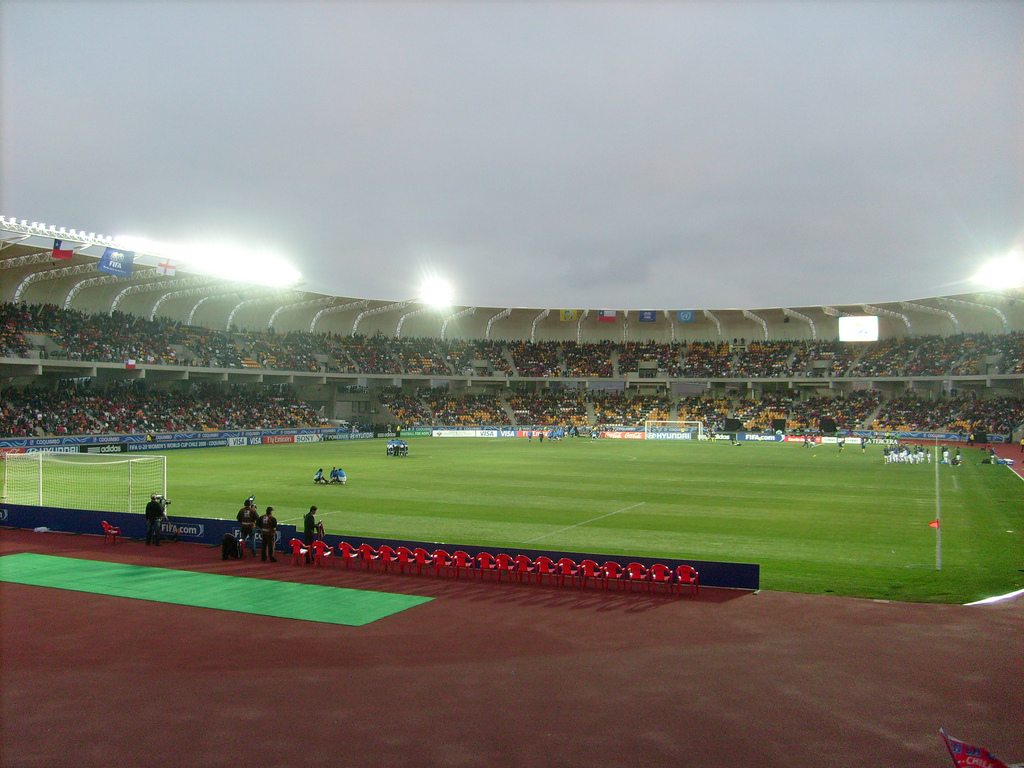
Inside view of the new stadium.

The home stadium of Coquimbo Unido is Estadio Municipal Francisco Sánchez Rumoroso, located in Coquimbo, Chile. The stadium has a running track but it is used mostly for football matches. The former stadium was inaugurated on 1 July 1970 and held 17,750 people.

In 2007 the stadium was selected as a venue for the 2008 FIFA U-20 Women's World Cup. In order to comply with FIFA standards, a completely new stadium was built. Its capacity was increased from 15,000 to 18,750. The new stadium has the shape of ship so as to homage Coquimbo's oceanic tradition. The city has been famous due to its port and pirate lore. The stadium was inaugurated on 9 November 2008.

== Current squad ==
Current squad of Coquimbo Unido as of 7 August 2026 (edit)
Sources: ANFP Official Web Site

No.		Position	Player
1	CHI	GK	Gonzalo Flores
2	CHI	DF	Benjamín Gazzolo
3	URU	DF	Manuel Fernández
4	ARG	DF	Elvis Hernández
7	CHI	MF	Sebastián Galani (c)
8	ARG	MF	Alejandro Camargo
9	ARG	FW	Nicolás Johansen
10	ARG	MF	Guido Vadalá
11	CHI	FW	Alejandro Azócar
12	ARG	FW	Lucas Pratto
13	CHI	GK	Diego Sánchez
14	CHI	DF	Salvador Cordero
15	CHI	FW	Cristián Zavala (loan from Colo-Colo)
16	CHI	DF	Juan Cornejo
17	CHI	DF	Francisco Salinas
18	CHI	MF	Pablo Rodríguez (loan from Unión San Felipe)
19	USA	DF	Joshua Arancibia
20	CHI	FW	Martín Mundaca

No.		Position	Player
21	CHI	GK	Cristóbal Dorador
23	CHI	MF	Matías Zepeda
24	CHI	FW	Matías Alvarado
25	CHI	GK	Vicente Villegas
26	CHI	DF	Lukas Soza
27	PAR	FW	Luis Riveros
28	CHI	DF	Sebastián Cabrera
29	ARG	FW	Facundo Pons
30	CHI	MF	Benjamín Chandía
31	CHI	FW	Dixon Pereira
33	CHI	MF	Diego Chávez
34	CHI	MF	Paulo Torres
35	CHI	FW	Gino Alfaro
36	CHI	MF	Joaquín Rojas
37	CHI	FW	Adriano Calderón
38	CHI	FW	Lucas Saavedra
39	CHI	MF	Ythans Blanco
40	CHI	DF	Salvador Muñoz

Manager: Hernán Caputto

=== Out on loan ===
Note: Flags indicate national team as defined under FIFA eligibility rules; some limited exceptions apply. Players may hold more than one non-FIFA nationality.

No.	Pos.	Nation	Player
—	DF	CHI	Dylan Escobar (at Deportes Limache)
—	MF	ARG	Dylan Glaby (at Palestino)
—	MF	CHI	Nicolás Julio (at Provincial Ovalle)

No.	Pos.	Nation	Player
—	MF	CHI	Diego Ortiz (at Brujas de Salamanca)
—	MF	CHI	Diego Plaza (at Rangers)

=== 2026 Winter Transfers ===
==== In ====
Note: Flags indicate national team as defined under FIFA eligibility rules; some limited exceptions apply. Players may hold more than one non-FIFA nationality.

No.	Pos.	Nation	Player
29	FW	ARG	Facundo Pons (from San Martín Tucumán)

==== Out ====
Note: Flags indicate national team as defined under FIFA eligibility rules; some limited exceptions apply. Players may hold more than one non-FIFA nationality.

No.	Pos.	Nation	Player
5	DF	CHI	Dylan Escobar (loan to Deportes Limache)
6	MF	ARG	Dylan Glaby (loan to Palestino)

No.	Pos.	Nation	Player
29	FW	ARG	Rodrigo Holgado (back to América de Cali)
32	MF	CHI	Nicolás Julio (loan to Provincial Ovalle)

== Managers ==
Coquimbo Unido has been managed predominantly by Chilean coaches throughout its history. Among its early managers were Santiago Salfate, Francisco Molina, Raúl Pino and Luis Santibáñez. The club's first promotion to the Primera División, as champions of the 1962 Segunda División, came during a season in which Fidel Cuiña and Óscar Olivares were in charge.

José Sulantay became one of the managers most closely associated with the club, serving several spells between the late 1970s and early 2000s. His most notable period came in 1990–91, when he guided Coquimbo back to Primera División and subsequently to second place in the 1991 championship, qualifying the club for its first Copa Libertadores appearance.

Other notable managers included Fernando Cavalleri, Raúl Toro and Juan José Ribera. Toro led Coquimbo to the final of the 2005 Apertura, where the club finished runner-up to Unión Española.

Argentine coach Patricio Graff took charge in 2017 and guided Coquimbo to the 2018 Primera B championship and promotion after eleven years outside the top flight. Héctor Tapia later led the club to another Primera B title in 2021, securing an immediate return to Primera División.

After spells under Graff and Fernando Díaz, Esteban González was appointed in 2024. He achieved the greatest domestic success in the club's history by leading Coquimbo Unido to its first Primera División championship in 2025. Argentine-Chilean coach Hernán Caputto succeeded him in 2026.

=== List of managers ===
- (Chile) Óscar Olivares (1958)
- (Chile) Santiago Salfate (1959–1960)
- (Chile) Gustavo Pizarro (1960–1961)
- (Chile) Lincoyán Neira (1961)
- (Chile) Fidel Cuiña (1962)
- (Chile) Óscar Olivares (1962)
- (Chile) (Spain) Francisco Molina (1963–1964)
- (Argentina) Ramón Guiñazú (1965)
- (Chile) Raúl Pino (1966)
- (Chile) Daniel Torres (1967)
- (Chile) Fidel Cuiña (1967)
- (Chile) Jorge Casanova (1968)
- (Chile) Luis Santibáñez (1969)
- (Argentina) Héctor Novoa (1969–1970)
- (Chile) Dante Pesce (1970)
- (Chile) Jorge Venegas (1971)
- (Chile) Fidel Cuiña (1972)
- (Argentina) Héctor Novoa (1972)
- (Chile) Víctor Seura (1972)
- (Chile) Ramón Climent (1973)
- (Chile) Ramón Estay (1974)
- (Argentina) Héctor Novoa (1974)
- (Chile) Enrique Hormazábal & (Paraguay) Eladio Zárate (1976)
- (Chile) Óscar Olivares (1976)
- (Chile) Pedro Cruces (1976)
- (Chile) Ramón Climent (1977)
- (Chile) (Soviet Union) Sasha Mitjaew (1978)
- (Chile) Luis Álamos (1978)
- (Chile) José Sulantay (1978)
- (Chile) Luis Ibarra (1978–1979)
- (Chile) Ramón Climent (1979)
- (Chile) José Sulantay & (Argentina) Héctor Novoa (1980)
- (Argentina) (Chile) Néstor Isella (1980)
- (Chile) Ramón Climent (1981)
- (Chile) José Sulantay (1981–1983)
- (Chile) Antonio Vargas (1984)
- (Chile) Víctor Seura (1984)
- (Chile) Juan Rodríguez Vega (1984)
- (Chile) José Sulantay (1985)
- (Chile) Ramón Climent (1986–1987)
- (Chile) Mario Chirino (1988)
- (Chile) Andrés Prieto (1988)
- (Chile) Víctor Zelada (1988–1989)
- (Chile) Francisco Valdés (1989)
- (Chile) Ramón Climent (1990)
- (Chile) José Sulantay (1990–1992)
- (Uruguay) Jorge Luis Siviero (1992)
- (Chile) Hugo Valdivia (1992)
- (Chile) Eduardo Cortázar (1993)
- (Chile) Víctor Seura (1993)
- (Chile) Luis Santibáñez (1993)
- (Chile) Sasha Mitjaew (1994)
- (Chile) Freddy Delgado (1994)
- (Chile) Dagoberto Olivares (1994)
- (Chile) José Sulantay (1994–1995)
- (Chile) Manuel Rodríguez (1995–1996)
- (Argentina) Víctor Milanese Comisso (1996–1997)
- (Chile) Miguel Hermosilla (1997–1998)
- (Chile) José Sulantay (1998)
- (Argentina) Ángel Celoria (1999)
- (Chile) Sergio Cortés (1999)
- (Chile) Manuel Rodríguez (1999)
- (Argentina) (Chile) Fernando Cavalleri (1999–2000)
- (Chile) José Sulantay (2001–2003)
- (Chile) Raúl Toro (2004–2005)
- (Chile) Mario Chirino (2005)
- (Argentina) Jorge Manuel Díaz (2006)
- (Chile) Francisco Varela (2006)
- (Chile) Sergio Cortés (2006-2007)
- (Argentina) Oscar Malbernat (2007)
- (Chile) Dagoberto Olivares (2007)
- (Croatia) Andrija Perčić (2007)
- (Chile) Nelson Cossio (2008)
- (Chile) Mario Chirino (2008)
- (Argentina) Víctor Milanese Comisso (2008–2009)
- (Chile) Gustavo Huerta (2009)
- (Chile) Orlando Mondaca (2009–2010)
- (Chile) Luis Venegas (2010)
- (Chile) José Sulantay (2010)
- (Chile) Diego Torrente (2011)
- (Chile) Jaime Muñoz (2011)
- (Argentina) Roberto Mariani (2011–2012)
- (Chile) Jaime Muñoz (2012)
- (Chile) Luis Musrri (2012–2013)
- (Chile) Dagoberto Olivares (2013)
- (Chile) Carlos Rojas (2013–2014)
- (Chile) Carlos San Martín (2014)
- (Chile) Jaime Muñoz (2014)
- (Chile) Víctor Hugo Castañeda (2014–2015)
- (Argentina) Jorge Cerino & (Chile) Marcelo Corrales (2015)
- (Chile) Juan José Ribera (2016–2017)
- (Argentina) Patricio Graff (2018–2019)
- (Argentina) Germán Corengia (2020)
- (Chile) Rafael Celedón (2020)
- (Chile) Juan José Ribera (2020–2021)
- (Chile) Héctor Tapia (2021)
- (Argentina) Patricio Graff (2022)
- (Chile) Fernando Díaz (2022–2024)
- (Chile) Esteban González (2024–2025)
- (Argentina) (Chile) Hernán Caputto (2026–)

== Honours ==
=== National ===
- Primera División
  - Champions (1): 2025
- Copa de la Liga
  - Champions (1): 2026
- Supercopa de Chile
  - Champions (1): 2026
- Segunda División/Primera B
  - Winners (4): 1962, 1977, 2018, 2021

=== Women's team ===
- Primera B:
  - Winners (1): 2022

=== Futsal team ===
- Campeonato Nacional:
  - Winners (1): 2026-A

== Statistics ==
- Seasons in Primera División: 31 (1963–65), (1978–80), (1984), (1991–2007), (2019–2020), (2022–)
- Seasons in Primera B: 36 (1959–62), (1966–74), (1976–77), (1981–83), (1985–90), (2008–2018), (2021)
- Copa Libertadores Appearances: 2 (1992 & 2026)
- Copa Sudamericana Appearances: 2 (2020 & 2024)
- Largest Margin of Victory: 6–0 v. Cobresal in (1999)
- Largest Margin of Defeat: 1–9 v. Cobreloa in (1999)
- Highest home attendance: 14,935 v. Colo-Colo, Copa Libertadores, (17 March 1992)
- Most goals scored (Primera División matches): 56, Marcelo Corrales (2004-2007)
- Best Finish in Primera División: Winners (2025)
- Best Finish in Copa Chile: Semifinals (2021)

=== South American cups history ===
Season	Competition	Round	Country	Club	Home	Away (Note: The first number indicates goals scored by Coquimbo Unido)	Aggregate
1992	Copa Libertadores	Group Stage; Group 1	(Chile)	Colo-Colo	1–1	0–1	5th Place
1992	Copa Libertadores	Group Stage; Group 1	(Chile)	Universidad Católica	3–2	1–5	5th Place
1992	Copa Libertadores	Group Stage; Group 1	(Argentina)	Newell's Old Boys	1–2	0–3	5th Place
1992	Copa Libertadores	Group Stage; Group 1	(Argentina)	San Lorenzo	0–1	0–3	5th Place
2020	Copa Sudamericana	First Stage	(Venezuela)	Aragua	3–0	0–1	3–1
2020	Copa Sudamericana	Second Stage	(Venezuela)	Estudiantes de Mérida	3–0	2–0	5–0
2020	Copa Sudamericana	Round of 16	(Peru)	Sport Huancayo	0–0	2–0	2–0
2020	Copa Sudamericana	Quarter-finals	(Colombia)	Junior	0–1	2–1	2–2 (a)
2020	Copa Sudamericana	Semi-finals	(Argentina)	Defensa y Justicia	0–0	2–4	2–4
2024	Copa Sudamericana	First Stage	(Chile)	Universidad Católica	—	2–0	2–0 (Note: tie played on a single-leg basis, home team (Universidad Católica) by drawing)
2024	Copa Sudamericana	Group Stage; Group H	(Argentina)	Racing	1–2	0–3	3rd Place
2024	Copa Sudamericana	Group Stage; Group H	(Paraguay)	Sportivo Luqueño	1–0	0–0	3rd Place
2024	Copa Sudamericana	Group Stage; Group H	(Brazil)	Red Bull Bragantino	1–1	0–1	3rd Place
2026	Copa Libertadores	Group Stage; Group B	(Uruguay)	Nacional	1–1	0–1	1st Place
2026	Copa Libertadores	Group Stage; Group B	(Peru)	Universitario	2–1	2–0	1st Place
2026	Copa Libertadores	Group Stage; Group B	(Colombia)	Deportes Tolima	3–0	0–3	1st Place
2026	Copa Libertadores	Round of 16	(Argentina)	Platense	0–0	1–1	1–1 (6–7 p)
