= Santiago Salfate =

Chilean footballer (1916-2010)

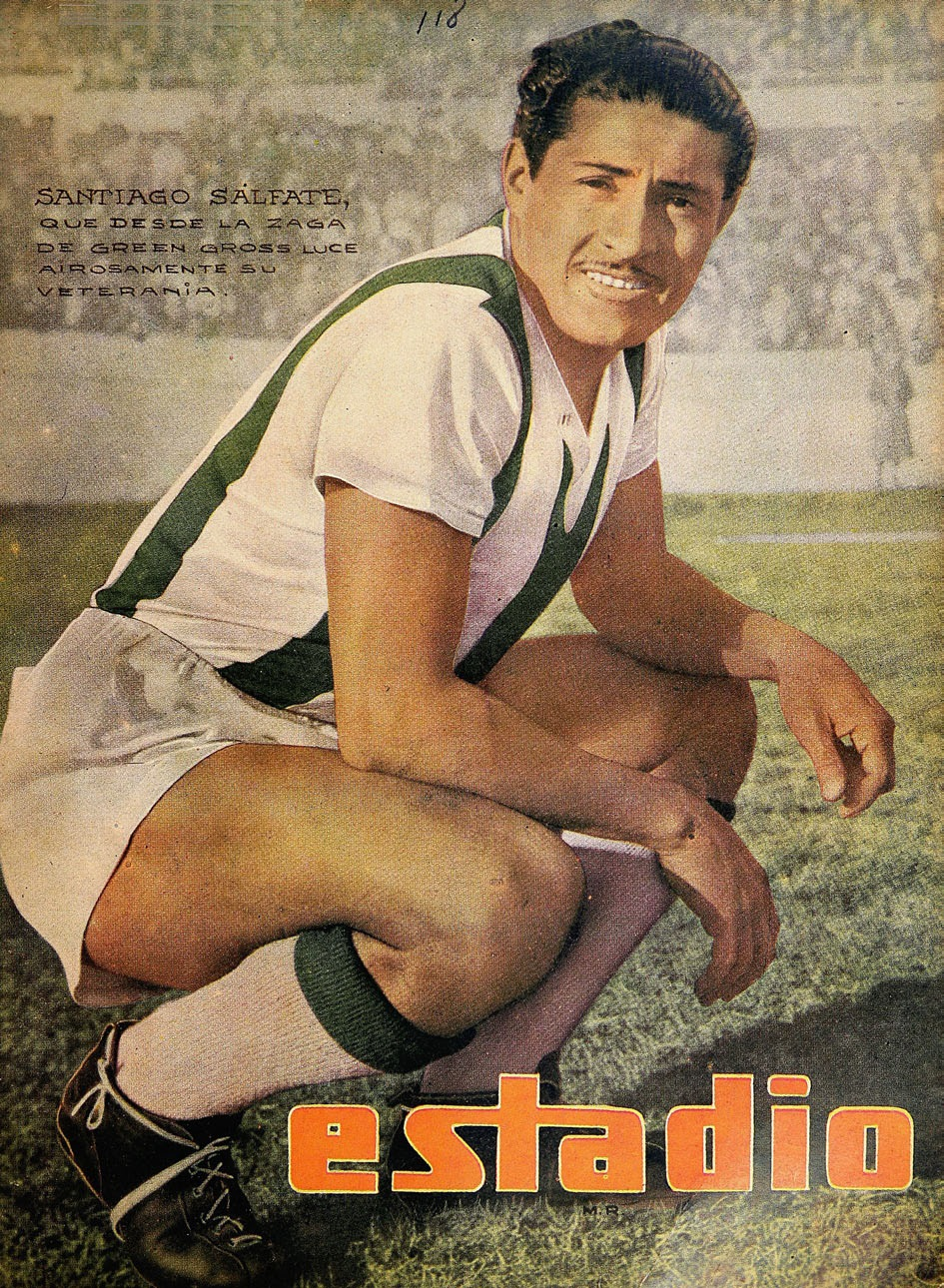
- Salfate on Estadio in 1945

Personal information
- Full name: Santiago Segundo Salfate Núñez
- Date of birth: 12 January 1916
- Place of birth: Iquique, Chile
- Date of death: 24 September 2010 (aged 94)
- Place of death: Santiago, Chile
- Position: Defender

Youth career
- Unión Pueblo Nuevo

Senior career*
| Years | Team | Apps | (Gls) |
| 1935 | Alessandri Boca Juniors | | |
| 1936–1938 | Iquique (city team) | | |
| 1938–1944 | Colo-Colo | 107 | (4) |
| 1945–1949 | Green Cross | | |

International career
| 1942–1946 | Chile | 11 | (1) |

Managerial career
- 1959: Coquimbo Unido
- * Club domestic league appearances and goals

Santiago Segundo Salfate Núñez (12 January 1916 – 24 September 2010) was a Chilean footballer.

== Career ==
He played in eleven matches for the Chile national football team from 1942 to 1946. He was also part of Chile's squad for the 1942 South American Championship.

At club level, Salfate was trained for Unión Pueblo Nuevo. He started his career with Alessandri Boca Juniors from Iquique in 1935 and later represented the Iquique city team, becoming amateur national champion. Next, he played for Colo-Colo and Green Cross.

He also had a brief career as manager since he coached Coquimbo Unido in 1959.

== Personal life ==
Before playing football, Salfate worked in saltpeter works and tugboats. He also had a handicraft studio at home.

His grandson, Mauricio "Yoyo" Salfate, honored him publishing "Invicto" (Undefeated), a comic book about his life.
