= Francisco Bozán =

Chilean footballer and manager (born 1986)

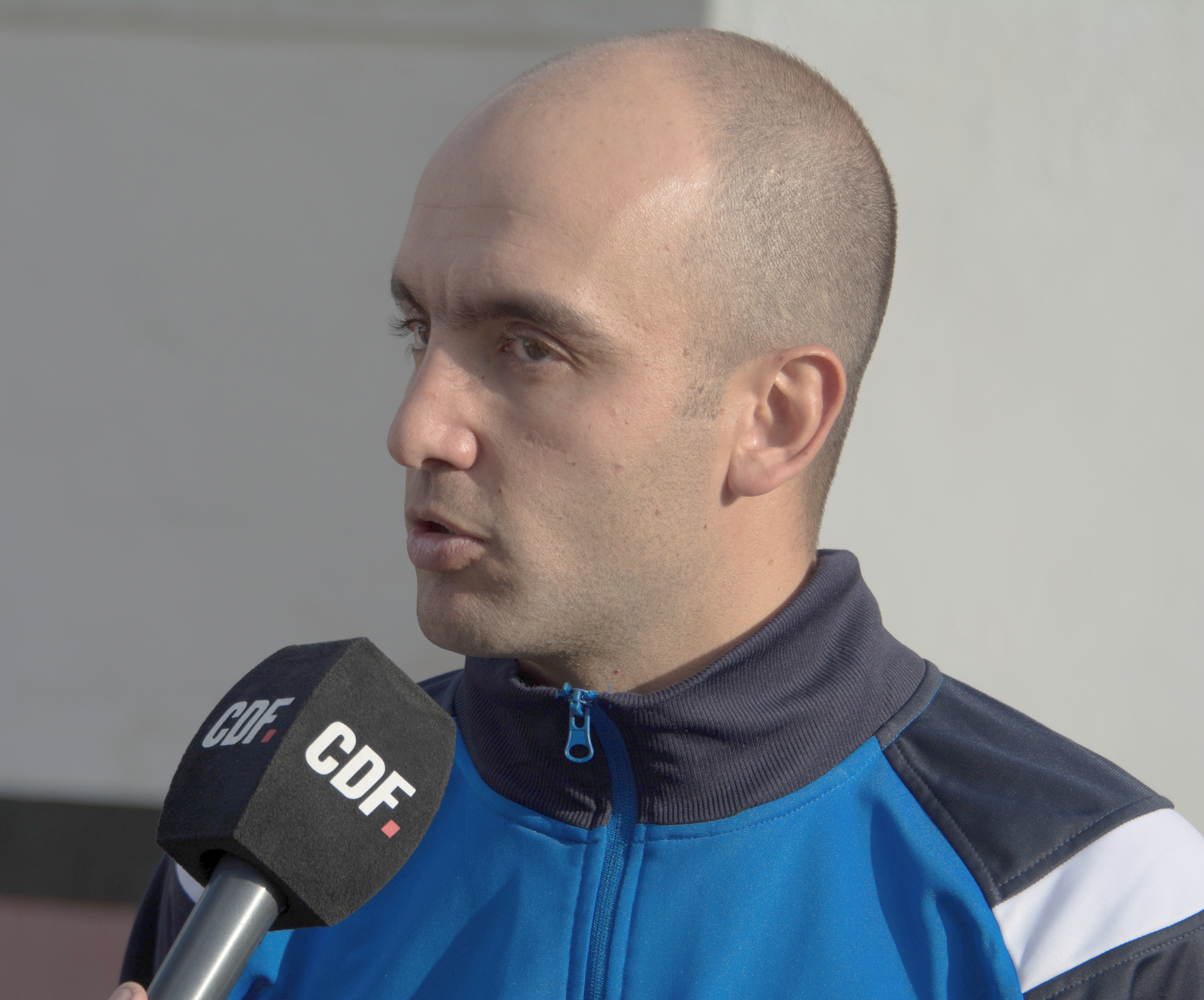
- Bozán in 2018

Personal information
- Full name: Francisco Andrés Bozán Santibáñez
- Date of birth: 21 October 1986 (age 40)
- Place of birth: Santiago, Chile
- Height: 1.73 m (5 ft 8 in)
- Position: Midfielder

Youth career
- Colo-Colo
- Bournemouth

Senior career*
Years	Team	Apps	(Gls)
2004	Bournemouth		
2005	Unión San Felipe		
2006	Municipal Ñuñoa		
2006	Barnechea		

Managerial career
- 2010: Municipal Hijuelas
- 2011: Deportes Santa Cruz
- 2014–2015: Barnechea
- 2016–2019: Universidad de Concepción
- 2020: Deportes La Serena
- 2021: San Luis
- 2022–2023: San Luis
- 2024: Curicó Unido
- 2024: San Luis
- 2025: Deportes La Serena (interim)
- * Club domestic league appearances and goals

Francisco Andrés Bozán Santibáñez (born 21 October 1986), is a Chilean football coach and former player who played as a midfielder.

== Career ==
Bozán was born in Santiago, Chile. He graduated as coach at the INAF, where he got an average of 6.7, the best historical of that institution, which allowed him to go to specialize to Spain to get the UEFA Pro Licence in the year 2012 at the premises of the Spanish selection. It also has the title of a psychologist in the UNIACC.

In 2014, he became the youngest manager of the Chilean tournament to handle the A.C. Barnechea, of the Chilean Primera Division at 27 years. He had previously been coach of Municipal Hijuelas of the Chilean Tercera B and Deportes Santa Cruz, in the Chilean Tercera Division.

On 1 November 2016, he became the new coach of Universidad de Concepción. After finishing on the last place in the 2019 Chilean Primera División, Bozán was fired on 10 December 2019. Three days later, he was hired as manager of Deportes La Serena.

In June 2021, he joined San Luis de Quillota in the Primera B de Chile.

In July 2024, Bozán returned to manage San Luis after a stint with Curicó Unido.
