= Víctor Zelada =

Chilean footballer (1945–2023)

Personal information
- Full name: Víctor Ramón Zelada Allende
- Date of birth: 22 January 1945
- Place of birth: Santiago, Chile
- Date of death: 15 November 2023 (aged 78)
- Place of death: Cerro Navia, Santiago, Chile
- Height: 1.69 m (5 ft 7 in)
- Position: Centre forward

Senior career*
Years	Team	Apps	(Gls)
1963–1964	Iberia		
1965	O'Higgins		
1966–1970	Colo-Colo	144	(70)
1971	Palestino		
1972	Deportes La Serena		
1973	Magallanes		
1974	Unión San Felipe		
1975–1976	Universidad de Chile		
1977	Ferroviarios		

International career
1970	Chile	2	(0)
- * Club domestic league appearances and goals

Víctor Ramón Zelada Allende (22 January 1945 – 15 November 2023) was a Chilean footballer. Nicknamed "Palomilla", he played as a central forward for various clubs throughout the late 1960s and 1970s, noted for playing for both Colo-Colo and Universidad de Chile throughout his career. He also represented his home country of Chile in 1970.

== Club career ==
Born in Santiago as the son of Ramón Zelada and Carmen Allende, Víctor moved to nearby El Monte with his four siblings Patricia, Carlos, Patricio and Jorge who also became a footballer for Universidad de Chile. Since childhood, he had the ambitious desire of making it as a professional football player and it was during his childhood life that he'd earn the nickname of "Palomilla" due to being highly energetic. He'd sign his first professional contract with Iberia for their 1963 season with Zelada being paid 50 escudos a month and despite the relatively low pay, he considered the sum to be a fortune for him. Around this time, he was permitted to temporarily halt his academic career to focus on his football career before eventually graduating with a bachelor's degree in biology at the University of Chile. Despite wanting to advance his academic career with a degree in commerce, his 1965 signing with O'Higgins prevented any meaningful breakthroughs in his studies beyond a few courses in English with the season also proving to be difficult for Zelada.

He then chose to sign with Colo-Colo for the following 1966 season with this being a dream of his since childhood. His discipline would also change as despite wanting to be the star player in his previous tenures for both Iberia and O'Higgins, his time at Colo-Colo would instill enough discipline within him to become a team player. His first two seasons at the club were considered his best as during the 1968 season, he'd collide with San Luis goalkeeper Ernesto Juan Díaz resulting in an injury in his right knee with many expecting this injury to be career-ending. This would result in him briefly being loaned to Magallanes with this period described as a low point for Zelada due to feeling as if his progression in football had been reset with the collision. Even with his return to Colo-Colo following his recovery, he wouldn't be paid nearly as much in comparison to other players such as Mario Rodríguez.

Despite this, he still maintained an optimistic outlook on his football career with his passion for the sport ultimately being his main motivation for persevering the early 1970s. During the 1969 season, he'd score three consecutive goals in a 4–1 victory against Antofagasta on 6 December 1969. By the time of his departure from the club, he made 144 appearances alongside scoring 70 goals with his final season being part of the winning squad of the 1970 Primera División de Chile. For the remainder of his career, he'd play for a variety of clubs throughout his career, being one of 78 players in the history of Chilean football to play for both Colo-Colo and Universidad de Chile with the latter occurring from the 1975 to 1976 seasons.

== International career ==
Zelada briefly represented Chile two times in two consecutive friendlies against Brazil on 22 March and 26 March 1970 with both resulting in 0–5 and 1–2 defeats for La Roja under manager Francisco Hormazábal.

== Personal life ==
Zelada later got married and had a son: Víctor Zelada Ramírez. At the age of 78, during a colonoscopy examination at the Hospital Clínico Félix Bulnes, he received two emergency surgeries due to a gastrointestinal perforation that had been uncovered. He'd later succumb to his failing health conditions and died on 15 November that same year.
