= Víctor Milanese Comisso =

Argentine football manager

Personal information
- Full name: Víctor Milanese Comisso
- Date of birth: 31 May 1959 (age 67)
- Place of birth: Córdoba, Argentina
- Position: Attacking midfielder

Senior career*
Years	Team	Apps	(Gls)
- Avellaneda
- Belgrano
- Rosario Central
- Olimpia
- Palmeiras
- Chaco For Ever

Managerial career
- 1984: Argentino de Mendoza (assistant)
- 1985: San Martín Mendoza
- 1988: Deportivo Maipú
- 1990: Huracán Las Heras
- 1992: Deportivo Maipú
- 1994–1995: Gimnasia de Mendoza
- 1996–1997: Coquimbo Unido
- 2002: Deportes Iquique
- 2004: Gimnasia CdU
- 2004: Argentino de Rosario
- 2007: Sol de América Formosa
- 2008: Luján de Cuyo
- 2008–2009: Coquimbo Unido
- 2009: Unión La Calera
- 2012: Racing de Olavarría
- 2013–2014: Racing de Olavarría
- 2018: Gutiérrez
- 2025: Rodeo del Medio (interim)
- * Club domestic league appearances and goals

Víctor Milanese Comisso (born 31 May 1959) is an Argentine football manager.

== Playing career ==
Born in Córdoba, Argentina, Milanese Comisso was an attacking midfielder for Avellaneda, Belgrano, Rosario Central, Olimpia, Palmeiras and Chaco For Ever, according to himself.

== Managerial career ==
Milanese Comisso started his career as assistant coach of Gualberto Muggione in Argentino de Mendoza in 1984 and replaced him as head coach of San Martín de Mendoza.

After coaching Huracán Las Heras in 1990, Milanese Comisso led Deportivo Maipú in the 1991–92 Primera B Nacional.

After coaching Gimnasia y Esgrima de Mendoza in 1994–95, Milanese Comisso moved to Chile and assumed as mamager of Coquimbo Unido in the 1996 Primera División. He returned to them in 2008–09. In that country, he also led Deportes Iquique in 2002 and Unión La Calera in 2009.

Holding an extensive career in his homeland, Milanese Comisso also coached General Paz Juniors, Racing de Córdoba, Gimnasia y Esgrima de Concepción del Uruguay, Argentino de Rosario, Sol de América, Luján de Cuyo, Racing de Olavarría, Gutiérrez, among others.

Working for Club Deportivo Rodeo del Medio, Milanese Comisso assumed as interim coach in 2025.

== Other works ==
Milanese Comisso graduated as a dentist and worked for a short time in his hometown.

Milanese Comisso has developed a career as a football commentator in his homeland.

== Personal life ==
His father was a soldier and his mother was a piano teacher.
