= Ian Rasso =

Argentine footballer

Personal information
- Full name: Ian Franco Rasso
- Date of birth: 14 August 2000 (age 26)
- Place of birth: Castelar, Buenos Aires, Argentina
- Height: 1.81 m (5 ft 11 in)
- Position: Defender

Team information
- Current team: Deportes La Serena
- Number: 34

Youth career
- 2006–2021: Veléz Sarsfield

Senior career*
Years	Team	Apps	(Gls)
2021–2024	Veléz Sarsfield	0	(0)
2022	→ Almirante Brown (loan)	14	(0)
2023	→ Atlanta (loan)	4	(0)
2023–2024	→ Colegiales (loan)	58	(1)
2025	Colegiales	22	(3)
2026	Quilmes	13	(1)
2026–	Deportes La Serena	1	(0)
- * Club domestic league appearances and goals as of 26 July 2026

Ian Franco Rasso (born 14 August 2000) is an Argentine footballer who plays as a defender for Chilean club Deportes La Serena.

== Career ==
Born in Castelar, Buenos Aires, Argentina, Rasso joined the Vélez Sarsfield youth ranks at the age of 6 and signed his first professional contract on 11 November 2021 on a deal until December 2024. He was sent on loan to Almirante Brown, Atlanta and Colegiales from 2022 to 2024.

As a member of Colegiales, Rasso won the 2024 Primera B Metropolitana and continued with them for the 2025 season.

In January 2026, Rasso joined Quilmes for a year. In July of the same year, he switched to Chilean club Deportes La Serena.
