= Fabricio Díaz (Argentine footballer) =

Argentine footballer

Personal information
- Full name: Alan Fabricio Díaz
- Date of birth: 13 April 2006 (age 20)
- Place of birth: Rosario, Argentina
- Position: Striker

Team information
- Current team: Deportes La Serena
- Number: 24

Youth career
- River Plate

Senior career*
Years	Team	Apps	(Gls)
2025–	Deportes La Serena	6	(0)
- * Club domestic league appearances and goals as of 31 August 2025

Alan Fabricio Díaz (born 13 April 2006), known as Fabricio Díaz, is an Argentine footballer who plays as a striker for Chilean club Deportes La Serena.

== Club career ==
Born in Rosario, Argentina, Díaz was trained at River Plate and stood out as a goalscorer for the under-18 team..

In January 2025, Díaz moved to Chile as a free agent and signed with Deportes La Serena in the Primera División. He made his debut in the 2–1 win against San Marcos de Arica for the 2025 Copa Chile on 9 February. Seven days later, he made his debut in the Chilean Primera División in the 1–3 loss against Colo-Colo, making the assist for Sebastián Gallegos.

On 5 January 2026, Díaz signed his professional contract with Deportes La Serena.
