= Dante Pesce =

Chilean footballer (1930–2013)

Personal information
- Full name: José Dante Pesce Figueroa
- Date of birth: 8 October 1930
- Place of birth: Santiago, Chile
- Date of death: 23 June 2013 (aged 82)
- Place of death: Santiago, Chile
- Position: Forward

Youth career
- Universidad de Chile

Senior career*
Years	Team	Apps	(Gls)
1950–1954	Universidad de Chile		
1954	→ LDU Quito (loan)		
1955–1960	Green Cross		
1961	Universidad Católica		

Managerial career
- 1961: Green Cross (youth)
- 1961: Green Cross
- 1963: ACF (youth)
- 1963–1964: San Luis
- 1965: Unión Española
- 1965: Universidad Católica (assistant)
- 1965: Iberia
- 1965: Concepción-Lord
- 1966: Deportes La Serena
- 1967: Deportes La Serena
- 1968: O'Higgins
- 1968–1970: Deportes La Serena
- 1970: Coquimbo Unido
- 1971: Palestino
- 1972–1973: Lota Schwager
- 1975: Audax Italiano
- 1976: Deportes La Serena
- 1977–1979: Universidad de Chile (youth)
- 1980: Deportes La Serena
- 1981: Santiago Wanderers
- 1981–1982: Deportes La Serena
- 1984: Deportes La Serena
- 1986: Provincial Osorno
- 1999: Deportes La Serena (youth)
- 1999: Deportes La Serena
- * Club domestic league appearances and goals

José Dante Pesce Figueroa (8 October 1930 – 23 June 2013), known as Dante Pesce, was a Chilean football player and manager who played as a forward. Besides Chile, he played in Ecuador.

== Career ==
=== As player ===
A forward from the Universidad de Chile youth system, Pesce made his debut on 29 April 1950 in a 4–3 win against Universidad Católica, scoring the first goal. In 1954, he was loaned to Ecuadorian side Liga de Quito, scoring a goal in the first official match in the club history. He and his compatriot Carlos Arce became the first Chileans to play for them before players such as Pedro Pérez, Adolfo Ovalle, Edson Puch, among others.

Back in Chile, he played for Green Cross until 1960 and Universidad Católica in the 1961 Copa Chile Green Cross, scoring two goals in the final match.

=== As manager ===
He developed his career in Chile. Subsequently, his retirement, he began coaching Green Cross in the top division. In that division, he also led San Luis, Unión Española, Deportes La Serena, O'Higgins and Lota Schwager.

In the second division, he led Iberia, Coquimbo Unido, Palestino, Audax Italiano, Deportes La Serena, Santiago Wanderers and Provincial Osorno.

At youth level, he worked in the systems of Green Cross, Universidad de Chile and Deportes La Serena. In 1963, he also coached a youth team made up by players from clubs in the Asociación Central de Fútbol (ACF) in a national championship in Arica.

In addition, he served as assistant in Universidad Católica in 1965 and was the third manager of Concepción-Lord, later Deportes Concepción, in the 1965 regional championship.

== Personal life ==
He made an appearance in the 1988 German film Der Radfahrer vom San Cristóbal (The Cyclist of San Cristóbal) by Peter Lilienthal, about a cyclist in the context of the Chilean society in the 1980s.

He suffered the Alzheimer's disease and died on 23 June 2013.

== Legacy ==
Pesce was a founder member of the Association of Football Managers in Chile alongside coaches such as Fernando Riera, Hugo Tassara, José Santos Arias, among others.

As a football coach of Deportes La Serena, he is considered a forefather of football academies in La Serena.
