= Fernando Dinamarca =

Chilean footballer

Personal information
- Full name: Fernando Elías Dinamarca Tapia
- Date of birth: 8 August 2004 (age 22)
- Place of birth: La Serena, Chile
- Position: Left-back

Team information
- Current team: Deportes La Serena
- Number: 26

Youth career
- Deportes La Serena

Senior career*
Years	Team	Apps	(Gls)
2024–	Deportes La Serena	25	(0)
2024	→ Provincial Ovalle (loan)	0	(0)
- * Club domestic league appearances and goals as of 15 December 2025

Fernando Elías Dinamarca Tapia (born 8 August 2004) is a Chilean footballer who plays as a left-back for Deportes La Serena.

== Club career ==
Born in La Serena, Chile, Dinamarca is a product of local club, Deportes La Serena. In 2024, he was promoted to the first team and had a brief stint on loan with Provincial Ovalle during July.

Back to Deportes La Serena, Dinamarca made his official debut in the 1–2 away win against Cobresal for the 2025 Copa Chile on 27 January and became a regular starting player in the 2025 Chilean Primera División. In August 2025, he was ranked five by CIES Football Observatory in the top 10 most promising defensive left backs.

== Personal life ==
Dinamarca have studies in auto mechanics.
