= Roberto Mariani (football manager) =

Argentine football manager

Personal information
- Full name: Roberto Rubén Mariani
- Date of birth: 8 January 1942
- Place of birth: Buenos Aires, Argentina

Managerial career
- Years: Team
- –1977: Universidad Cruceña
- 1977–1978: Blooming
- 1985: Oriente Petrolero
- 1986–1990: Argentina (assistant)
- 1986–1989: Argentina U20 (assistant)
- 1986–1986: Argentina U17 (assistant)
- 1988–1989: Argentina U17 (assistant)
- 1990–1993: Vélez Sarsfield (youth)
- 1992: Vélez Sarsfield (interim)
- 1994: Blooming
- 1994–2000: San Lorenzo (youth)
- 2001: Arsenal de Sarandí
- 2008–2009: Unión San Felipe
- 2010: San Luis
- 2011: Rangers
- 2011: Coquimbo Unido
- 2012–2013: Deportes Concepción
- 2019: Boca Unidos (interim)

Roberto Rubén Mariani (born 8 January 1942) is an Argentine football manager.

== Career ==
Mariani started his career in Bolivia with clubs such as Universidad Cruceña, Blooming and Oriente Petrolero.

A close friend of Carlos Bilardo, he joined his technical staff as an assistant coach for the Argentina senior team in 1986 and also served as an assistant for the under-20's and the under-17's. As an anecdote, he holded the ball used in the 1986 FIFA World Cup final.

Following the Argentina national teams, Mariani worked as coach for the youth ranks of Vélez Sarsfield, leading the first team in 1992, and San Lorenzo de Almagro, with a brief stint with Blooming in 1994. In San Lorenzo, he trained players such as Eduardo Tuzzio, Guillermo Franco, Leandro Romagnoli.

In 2008, Mariani moved to Chile to led Unión San Felipe, winning the 2009 Primera B and the 2009 Copa Chile.

Following Unión San Felipe, Mariani coached San Luis de Quillota, Rangers de Talca, Coquimbo Unido and Deportes Concepción in Chile.

As coordinator for Boca Unidos, Mariani assumed as interim coach in July 2019.
