= Francisco Villegas =

Argentine footballer

Personal information
- Full name: Francisco Alfonso Villegas Collante
- Date of birth: 6 October 1917
- Place of birth: Buenos Aires, Argentina
- Date of death: 17 October 1976 (aged 59)
- Place of death: Mexico City, Mexico
- Position: Midfielder

Youth career
- 1929–1935: River Plate

Senior career*
Years	Team	Apps	(Gls)
1935–1936	River Plate		
1936	Peñarol	1	(0)
1936–1940	Huracán		
1942–1943	Sevilla	2	(0)
1943–1945	Xerez	19	(6)
1945–1946	Gimnástico de Tarragona	14	(3)
1946–1947	Estoril		
1948	São Cristóvão		

Managerial career
- 1952–1955: Atlético Chalaco
- 1956: Magallanes
- 1957: La Salle
- 1958: Almagro
- 1958–1959: Atlético Chalaco
- 1959: Puebla
- 1960: Deportes La Serena
- 1961: Unión Española
- 1961: España
- 1962: Once Caldas
- 1964: Cúcuta Deportivo
- 1965–1970: Deportivo Cali
- 1970: Millonarios
- 1971: LDU Quito
- 1973: Junior
- Deportivo Pereira
- * Club domestic league appearances and goals

Francisco Alfonso Villegas Collante (6 October 1917 – 17 October 1976) was an Argentine football manager and player who played as a midfielder. Besides Argentina, he played for clubs in Uruguay, Spain, Portugal and Brazil.

== Playing career ==
- (Argentina) River Plate 1935–1936
- (Uruguay) Peñarol 1936
- (Argentina) Huracán 1936–1940
- (Spain) Sevilla 1942–1943
- (Spain) Xerez 1943–1945
- (Spain) Gimnástico de Tarragona 1945–1946
- (Portugal) Estoril 1946–1947
- (Brazil) São Cristóvão 1948

== Managerial career ==
- (Peru) Atlético Chalaco 1952–1955
- (Chile) Magallanes 1956
- (Venezuela) La Salle 1957
- (Argentina) Almagro 1958
- (Peru) Atlético Chalaco 1958–1959
- (Mexico) Puebla 1959
- (Chile) Deportes La Serena 1960
- (Chile) Unión Española 1961
- (Ecuador) España 1961
- (Colombia) Once Caldas 1962
- (Colombia) Cúcuta Deportivo 1964
- (Colombia) Deportivo Cali 1965–1970
- (Colombia) Millonarios 1970
- (Ecuador) LDU Quito 1971
- (Colombia) Junior 1973
- (Colombia) Deportivo Pereira

== Personal life ==
Villegas was born in Buenos Aires, Argentina, to a Spanish parents. He died on 17 October 1976 in Mexico City.
