= Sergio Lecea =

Chilean footballer and manager (1931–2019)

Personal information
- Full name: Sergio Lecea Fernández
- Date of birth: 1931
- Place of birth: Chile
- Date of death: 2019 (aged 87–88)
- Place of death: Chile
- Position: Defender

Youth career
- Ferrobádminton

Senior career*
Years	Team	Apps	(Gls)
- Ferrobádminton

Managerial career
- 1959: Deportes La Serena
- 1962–1964: Palestino (youth)
- 1964: Deportes La Serena
- 1966–1967: Honduras
- 1967–1968: UES
- 1969: Palestino
- 1970–1980: Universidad de Chile (youth)
- 1976: Chile Universitario
- 1981: Aviación (assistant)
- 1981–1990: Universidad de Chile (youth)
- 1984: UTE
- * Club domestic league appearances and goals

Sergio Lecea Fernández (1931 – 2019) was a Chilean football defender and manager who worked in Chile, Honduras and El Salvador.

== Playing career ==
A defender from the Ferrobádminton youth system, Lecea made appearances for the first team at the beginning of the 1950s at the Chilean top division.

== Coaching career ==
Mostly known by his managerial career, he began it with Deportes La Serena at the 1959 Primera División, leading them again in 1964. In his homeland, he also coached Palestino in 1969 and was the assistant of Hernán Carrasco in Aviación in 1981.

As coach of youth players, he worked for the youth systems of both Palestino (1962–64) and Universidad de Chile (1970–90).

At the same time he worked for Universidad de Chile, he led the first Chile university national team (Chile Universitario) in the 1976 world cup in Uruguay and the team of State Technical University (UTE) in 1984.

Abroad, he worked in Honduras as a teacher of football coaching before leading the Honduras national team (1966–67) for seven matches, with two wins, three draws and 2 losses.

In El Salvador, he coached Universidad de El Salvador (UES) at the top division in 1967–68. As an anecdote, he recommended the signing of his compatriot José Sulantay with the club.

== Personal life ==
Lecea played tennis at senior level, taking part of international tournaments.

== Legacy ==
As a football teacher, Lecea also made contributions for books and manuals.
