= Jorge Manuel Díaz =

Argentine footballer

Personal information
- Date of birth: 8 June 1966 (age 60)
- Place of birth: Santiago del Estero, Argentina
- Position: Midfielder

Senior career*
Years	Team	Apps	(Gls)
1987–1989	Rosario Central	74	(15)
1989–1990	Sturm Graz	25	(6)
1990–1991	VSE St. Pölten	6	(2)
1991	Racing Club	9	(0)
1992	Millonarios		
1993	Veracruz		
1994	O'Higgins	56	(18)
1995–1996	Gimnasia CdU		
1996	Deportes Temuco	17	(6)
1997	Deportes Puerto Montt	7	(1)
1998	Deportivo Táchira		
1999–2000	Coquimbo Unido	60	(32)
2001	O'Higgins	6	(0)

Managerial career
- 2002–2005: Rosario Central (youth)
- 2006: Coquimbo Unido
- 2007: Argentino de Rosario
- 2008: Rosario Central (youth)
- 2008: Rosario Central (interim)
- 2009: Argentino de Rosario
- Rosario Central (youth)
- * Club domestic league appearances and goals

Jorge Manuel Díaz (born June 8, 1966, in Santiago del Estero, Argentina) is a former Argentine footballer who played for clubs in Argentina, Chile, Mexico, Colombia, Venezuela and Austria.

== Teams (Player) ==
- (Argentina) Rosario Central 1987-1989
- (Austria) Strum Graz 1989–1990
- (Austria) SKN St. Pölten 1990–1991
- (Argentina) Racing Club 1991
- (Colombia) Millonarios 1992
- (Mexico) Veracruz 1993
- (Chile) O'Higgins 1994-1995
- (Chile) Deportes Temuco 1996
- (Chile) Deportes Puerto Montt 1997
- (Venezuela) Deportivo Táchira 1998
- (Chile) Coquimbo Unido 1999-2000
- (Chile) O'Higgins 2001

== Teams (Coach) ==
Díaz has mainly developed his career with the Rosario Central youth ranks.

- (Chile) Coquimbo Unido 2006
- (Argentina) Argentino de Rosario 2007
- (Argentina) Rosario Central 2008
- (Argentina) Argentino de Rosario 2009

== Personal life ==
Díaz is well known by his nickname Pestaña (Eyelash).
