= Miguel Mocciola =

Argentine football player and manager

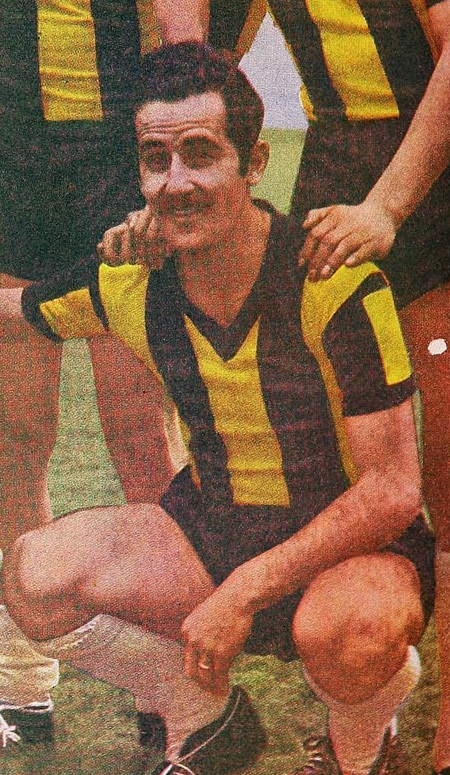
- Mocciola in 1948

Personal information
- Full name: Miguel Mocciola Greco
- Place of birth: Argentina
- Date of death: 25 December 1971
- Place of death: Santiago, Chile
- Position: Forward

Senior career*
| Years | Team | Apps | (Gls) |
| 1939 | Almagro | 1 | (0) |
| 1939–1942 | Audax Italiano | 67 | (40) |
| 1945 | San Lorenzo | 0 | (0) |
| 194? | Everton | | |
| 1948 | Bádminton | | |

Managerial career
- Audax Italiano (youth)
- Universidad Católica (youth)
- 1960–1962: Universidad Católica
- 1963: Deportes La Serena
- 1964: Palestino
- 1964: Ferrobádminton
- 1965–1966: Green Cross-Temuco
- 1969: Unión Española
- 1970: Deportes La Serena
- 1971: Magallanes
- * Club domestic league appearances and goals

Miguel Mocciola Greco (died 25 December 1971) was an Argentine football forward and manager.

== Career ==
A forward, Mocciola played in his homeland for Almagro in 1939. He moved to Chile and stood out with Audax Italiano from 1939 to 1942. He also played for Everton de Viña del Mar and Bádminton in Chile and had a stint with San Lorenzo de Almagro in his homeland.

As a football coach, Mocciola started his career at both the Audax Italiano and the Universidad Católica youth ranks. In 1960, he assumed as the head coach of Universidad Católica, winning the 1961 Primera División.

In Chile, Mocciola also led Deportes La Serena, Palestino, Ferrobádminton, Green Cross-Temuco, Unión Española and Magallanes.
