= Hugo Valdivia =

Chilean footballer and manager (1945–2017)

Personal information
- Full name: Juan Hugo de los Ángeles Valdivia Parra
- Date of birth: 15 November 1945
- Place of birth: La Serena, Chile
- Date of death: 30 September 2017 (aged 71)
- Place of death: La Serena, Chile

Youth career
- La Serena (city team)

Senior career*
Years	Team	Apps	(Gls)
1966–1968	Deportes La Serena	33	(1)
1969	Everton	4	(0)
1969	Universidad de Chile	3	(0)
1972–1976	Naval	115	(1)

Managerial career
- 1979–1986: Deportes La Serena (youth)
- 1986: Deportes La Serena
- 1988: Deportes Ovalle
- 1989: Meteor SC
- 1991: Deportes La Serena (interim)
- 1992: Coquimbo Unido (interim)
- 1994: Deportes La Serena
- 2000: Deportes La Serena
- * Club domestic league appearances and goals

Juan Hugo de los Ángeles Valdivia Parra (15 November 1945 – 30 September 2017), known as Hugo Valdivia, was a Chilean football player and manager who worked in Chile and Peru.

== Career ==
As a player, Valdivia played for the La Serena city team alongside players such as Juan Koscina. At professional level, he played at the Chilean top division for Deportes La Serena (1966–68), Everton (1969), Universidad de Chile (1969) and Naval (1972–76).

As a football coach, he was widely related to his hometown club, Deportes La Serena, coaching them by first time in the 1986 Segunda División. He also led them in 1991, 1994 and 2000.

In 1992, he led the classic rival, Coquimbo Unido, at the top division.

In the second half 1989, he moved to Peru and led Meteor SC in the Peruvian top division, saving them from relegation.

== Personal life ==
In addition to his football career, he was a normal teacher.

== Legacy ==
As a recognition for his contributions in football, the Municipality of La Serena made him a tribute in December 2016. In addition, the Football Labor Trade League of La Serena made him a posthumous tribute in 2019 and gave his name, "Juan Hugo Valdivia Parra", to its tournament in 2018.

He also was an active citizen, leading social group such as Club Social Adulto Mayor "Rojinos de Verdad" (Senior Social Club "Real Rojinos").
