= György Ormós =

Hungarian football manager (1914–2013)

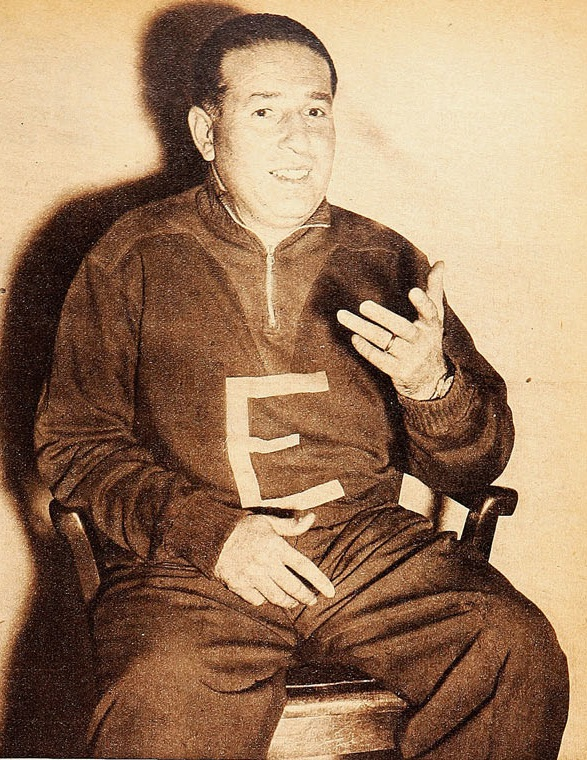

Personal information
- Full name: György Ormós Grozzi
- Date of birth: 2 May 1914
- Place of birth: Austria-Hungary
- Date of death: 4 January 2013 (aged 98)
- Place of death: Toronto, Canada

Managerial career
- Years: Team
- 1951–1952: Green Cross
- 1953–1954: Universidad de Chile
- 1956–1957: Universidad Católica
- 1959: Gimnasia La Plata
- 1963: Montreal Cantalia

György Ormós Grozzi (2 May 1914 – 4 January 2013), known as Jorge Ormos in Spanish and George Ormós in English, was a Hungarian football manager.

== Career ==
Ormós mainly developed his career in Chile and Argentina. He came to Chile at the end of 1949 and joined Everton de Viña del Mar as a fitness coach in his capacity as a PE teacher.

In the Chilean Primera División, he coached Green Cross (1951–52), Universidad de Chile (1953–54) and Universidad Católica (1957). He made three appearances in the Clásico Universitario: a win and a loss leading Universidad de Chile and a draw leading Universidad Católica.

With Universidad Católica, Ormós also won the 1956 Segunda División de Chile and got promotion to the top division.

As notable landmarks, Ormós made possible the professional debut of the historical Chile international footballer Leonel Sánchez with Universidad de Chile in 1953 and was the reason why the Universidad Católica's idol Sergio Livingstone moved to Colo-Colo in 1957.

In 1959, Ormós moved to Argentina and led Gimnasia y Esgrima La Plata in the Argentine Primera División.

Settled in Canada, Ormós led Montreal Cantalia FC in the Eastern Canada Professional Soccer League.

== Personal life ==
Together György and his wife, Maria, lived an entrepreneurial life in many countries and cities: Hungary, Chile, Argentina, Montreal and Toronto where they achieved success with their company Or-Plast Ltd.

Ormós had family in Chile, California and Wales. He settled and died in Toronto, Canada, on 13 January 2013.
