= Vértiz =

Coordinates: 35°26′S 63°54′W

- Rural locality and village
- Interactive map of Vértiz
- Country: Argentina
- Province: La Pampa
- Time zone: UTC−3 (ART)

Vértiz is a village and rural locality (municipality) in La Pampa Province in Argentina. It has a population of 501 people (as of 2015).
