= Alberto Buccicardi =

Chilean footballer (1914–1970)

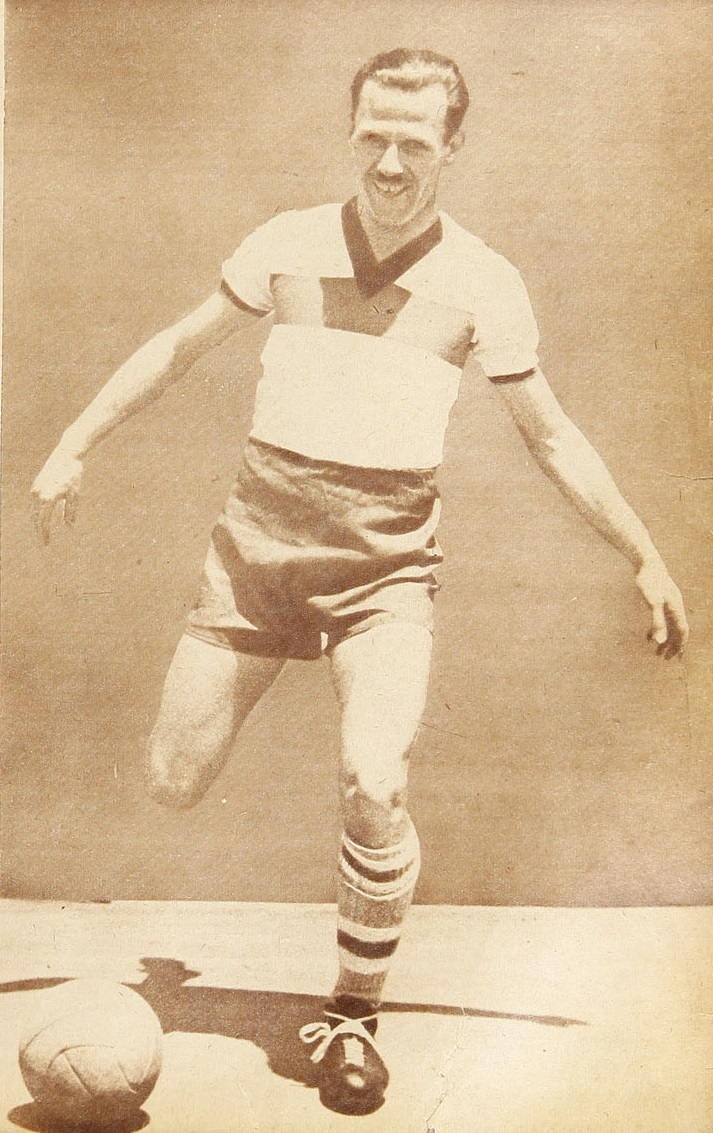
- Buccicardi in the early 1940s

Personal information
- Full name: Alberto Buccicardi Ferrari
- Date of birth: 11 May 1914
- Place of birth: Chile
- Date of death: 8 December 1970 (aged 56)

Senior career*
Years	Team	Apps	(Gls)
1939–1945	CD Universidad Católica		

Managerial career
- CD Universidad Católica
- 1949–1950: Chile
- * Club domestic league appearances and goals

Alberto Buccicardi Ferrari, named Arturo Bucciardi by FIFA, (11 May 1914 – 8 December 1970) was a Chilean football player and manager, who coached Chile in the 1950 FIFA World Cup.

Buccicardi played and coached Club Deportivo Universidad Católica in 1940s and 1950s.
