= Raúl Toro (footballer, born 1954) =

Chilean footballer and manager

Personal information
- Full name: Raúl Daniel Toro Fuenzalida
- Date of birth: 24 June 1954 (age 72)
- Place of birth: Santiago, Chile
- Height: 1.73 m (5 ft 8 in)
- Position: Midfielder

Senior career*
Years	Team	Apps	(Gls)
1973–1982	Unión Española		
1983–1984	Santiago Morning		
1985–1986	Aviación		
1987	Huachipato		
1988–1989	Unión San Felipe		
1990	Curicó Unido		
1992	Soinca Bata		
1993	Colchagua		

Managerial career
- 1994–1995: Colchagua
- 1996–1999: Rangers
- 2000–2003: Unión San Felipe
- 2004–2005: Coquimbo Unido
- 2006–2008: Audax Italiano
- 2009–2010: Cobreloa
- 2010–2011: Curicó Unido
- 2012: Unión La Calera
- 2013: Liga de Loja
- * Club domestic league appearances and goals

Raúl Daniel Toro Fuenzalida (born 24 June 1954) is a Chilean former football manager and player who played as a midfielder.

== Playing career ==
Born in Santiago, Toro played for several clubs in his country during a 20-year senior career, in both the Campeonato Nacional and the second division. He spent his first nine seasons as a senior with Unión Española.

In 1992, 38-year-old Toro helped Soinca Bata, the club before Deportes Melipilla, promote to the top level. He retired the following year, after a spell with Colchagua.

== Managerial career ==
Toro started working as a coach in division two, successively being in charge of Colchagua and Rangers de Talca and helping the latter club finish runner-up in the 1996 edition of the Copa Chile. Four years later, he won the second tier championship with Unión San Felipe – where he had played in the late 80's – and, in the 2001 campaign, led the team to the eighth position.

In the 2005 Apertura, Toro coached Coquimbo Unido all the way to the final after dispatching Everton de Viña del Mar, Cobreloa and Huachipato, losing 2–4 on aggregate to Unión Española. Between 2006 and 2008 he was in charge of an historical Audax Italiano squad which included players like Fabián Orellana, Nicolás Peric, Franco Di Santo or Carlos Villanueva, qualifying them to the 2008 Copa Libertadores. However, after elimination from the competition and irregular displays in the domestic league, he was fired and replaced by Pablo Marini.

Subsequently, Toro coached Cobreloa, Curicó and Unión La Calera, before moving abroad in 2013 with Ecuador's LDU Loja.

He has stated his permanent retirement from the activity because he doesn't agree with the meddling of football agents in squads building.

== Honours ==
=== Manager ===
Unión San Felipe

- Primera B (Chile): 2000

Rangers

- Copa Chile Runner-up: 1996

Coquimbo Unido

- Chilean Primera División Runner-up: 2005 Apertura
