= Fernando Díaz (footballer) =

Chilean footballer and manager (born 1961)

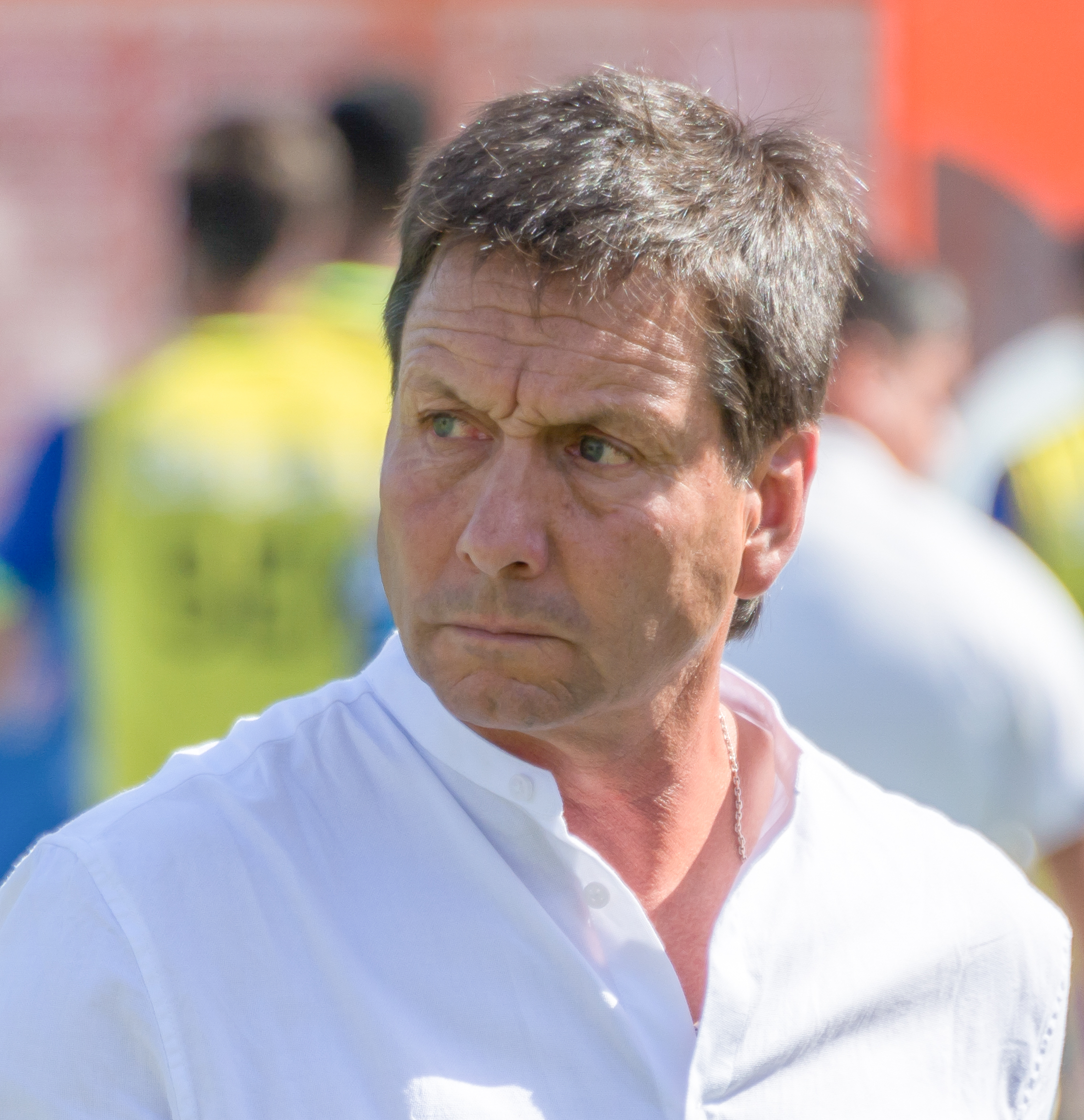
- Díaz as manager of Unión Española in 2019

Personal information
- Full name: Fernando Maximiliano Díaz Seguel
- Date of birth: 27 December 1961 (age 64)
- Place of birth: Santiago, Chile
- Position: Goalkeeper

Team information
- Current team: Deportes Concepción (manager)

Youth career
- Universidad Católica

Senior career*
Years	Team	Apps	(Gls)
1980–1982	Universidad Católica	0	(0)
1982	Colchagua		
1983	Curicó Unido		
1984–1985	Universidad Católica	2	(0)
1985	Iberia		
1986	Universidad Católica	0	(0)
1986	Deportes Antofagasta		
1987–1990	Universidad Católica	2	(0)
1991	Deportes Ovalle		
1992	Universidad Católica	0	(0)

Managerial career
- Universidad Católica (youth)
- 1999: LDU Quito (assistant)
- 2000: LDU Quito
- 2001: Deportes Puerto Montt
- 2003: Universidad de Concepción
- 2004: Cobreloa
- 2005: Unión Española
- 2006: Cobresal
- 2007: Deportes Antofagasta
- 2008–2009: Ñublense
- 2010: Universidad Católica (ECU)
- 2010–2011: Santiago Morning
- 2012: Universidad de Concepción
- 2013: Municipal
- 2014: San Marcos
- 2015–2016: Ñublense
- 2018–2019: Unión Española
- 2022–2024: Coquimbo Unido
- 2025: Deportes Iquique
- 2026–: Deportes Concepción
- * Club domestic league appearances and goals

Fernando Maximiliano Díaz Seguel (born 27 December 1961) is a Chilean football manager and former player who played as a goalkeeper. He is the current manager of Deportes Concepción.

== Career ==
He is known for winning 2005 Apertura with Unión Española and for reaching the semifinals of the 2008 Apertura with Ñublense.

After two years without managing, he signed with Coquimbo Unido in the Chilean Primera División on 2 August 2022. In April 2025, he was appointed as the manager of Deportes Iquique and left them on 13 October of the same year.

== Honours ==
=== Manager ===
Unión Española

- Primera División de Chile: 2005 Apertura
