= Deportes La Serena =

Chilean football club

- Full name: Club de Deportes La Serena S.A.D.P.
- Nicknames: Papayeros; Granates; Club Deportes; Gigante de La Cuarta
- Founded: 9 December 1955; 70 years ago
- Ground: Estadio La Portada; La Serena, Chile
- Capacity: 18,243
- Chairman: Milko Leguas
- Manager: Felipe Gutiérrez
- League: Liga de Primera
- 2025: Liga de Primera, 13th of 16
- Website: www.cdlaserena.cl
Home colours	Away colours

Club de Deportes La Serena S.A.D.P., is a Chilean football club based in the city of La Serena, Coquimbo Region. The club was founded 9 December 1955 and currently plays in the Liga de Primera. Their home games are played at the La Portada stadium, which has a capacity of 18,254 seats. Their biggest rival is Coquimbo Unido. They are nicknamed "Gigante de La Cuarta", because of the 1960 Copa Preparación they won back in the 1960, being the only club in the region that has this trophy

== History ==
The history of the club are in the amateur football team in the city of La Serena, which was crowned national amateur champion three times in the years 1949, 1951 and 1954. This was the basis for that in 1955 the Football Association of the city invited to participate in professional football. Thus 9 December 1955, was founded the Club de Deportes La Serena to participate in the 1956 Ascent. To give life regulatory to the club was Deportivo Sindempart the local team had to change its name.

Their first match in second division was against Unión La Calera in the Estadio La Portada, a match that ended in a draw 0–0. In their first season, Deportes La Serena finished at the top of the table (with the same points as Universidad Católica), so they had to play an extra match to determine the champion, which was won by Universidad Católica 3–2, with the latter getting promoted to the First Division.

In 1958 Deportes La Serena for the first time participated in first division and finished third, tying in Colo-Colo score and one point behind champion that year Santiago Wanderers. During this season, club striker Carlos Verdejo was the scorer of the championship with 23 points, next to the player, Green Cross, Gustavo Albella.

In 1959 began with La Serena reaching the final of the Copa Chile, where he lost 5–1 against Santiago Wanderers. In that same championship striker José Sulantay was crowned top scorer of the tournament. However, in the official tournament in La Serena, ranked last, relegated to the next season.

The 1960s began with the club again reached the final of the Copa Chile, where defeated by 4–1 to Santiago Wanderers and were crowned champions of the tournament. For the official tournament La Serena ranked second in the Tournament of Ascent to 5 points behind champions Green Cross. The following year, La Serena, ranked fourth, but rose to first in this year were four teams that rose.

In 1962 with the first team again, Deportes La Serena made a good campaign that finally placed him fourth, tying score with Colo-Colo, and the following year, under the coaching staff of the Argentine Miguel Mocciola returned to make a good season finishing in third place.

Thereafter Deportes La Serena began to settle in the mid-table, getting seventh in 1964, the ninth in 1965 and again the seventh in 1966 and 1967.

For the year 1968 the tournament was played in several stages and Serena failed to qualify for the final stages, so it had to fight for their stay in the division of honour, which eventually succeeded. In 1969 also failed to reach the final stages of the championship.

revolucionIt promoted again to First Division of the year 2003, being runner-up after Everton of Primera B. For the play-offs (qualified in 2002), only ranked in the Torneo Clausura 2005 where he progressed to the semi-finals Colo-Colo, after a draw in matches Round-trip 1–1 and 3–3, by definition a criminal, which fell to Universidad Católica (3–3 and 1–0). In 2009, La Serena qualifying to the play-offs to this year and was eliminated by Colo-Colo in the global by 4–0.

In 2015 Canadian born Pancho Fernandez at the age of 18 was discovered by past Colo-Colo player (Carlos Rivas) who arranged to showcase him along with a number of Canadian soccer players to a number of Chilean teams. At that time Deportes La Serena expressed an interest in Pancho Fernandez and is now playing for their second team. During the 2017 pre-season, Pancho Fernandez had the opportunity to play in two matches where he came off the bench on one and started in another. Pancho Fernandez is the first Canadian born who is not of Chilean descent to ever play for Deportes La Serena.

== Stadium ==
Deportes La Serena plays at home at Estadio La Portada, premises owned by the Municipality of La Serena. It is located close to downtown, at the intersection with Avenida Avenida Amunátegui Balmaceda and his name is because between 1770 and 1903, at the same intersection where it is currently the stadium, there was a monument that served as main entrance to the city, which was called La Portada de La Serena.

The stadium was opened on 26 August 1952 and at first it was a dirt field, filling in until November 1955, coinciding with the arrival of professionalism Deportes La Serena. It currently has a capacity of 18,243 spectators.

== Players ==
=== Current squad ===
Current squad of Deportes La Serena as of 13 August 2026 (edit)
Sources: ANFP Official Web Site

No.		Position	Player
1	ARG	GK	Federico Lanzillotta
2	ARG	FW	Gonzalo Figueroa (loan from Deportivo Armenio)
3	CHI	DF	Matías Pérez (loan from Lecce)
4	ARG	MF	Francis Mac Allister
5	CHI	DF	Lucas Alarcón
6	CHI	MF	Sebastián Díaz
7	CHI	FW	Alexander Oroz
8	ARG	MF	Gonzalo Escalante
9	CHI	FW	Ángelo Henríquez
10	CHI	FW	Jeisson Vargas (c)
11	CHI	FW	Diego Rubio
12	CHI	GK	Máximo Hernández
14	CHI	MF	Felipe Chamorro
15	CHI	FW	Bastián Contreras
16	CHI	DF	Joaquín Gutiérrez (loan from Huachipato)
17	CHI	DF	Yahir Salazar (loan from Universidad de Chile)
18	CHI	FW	Gabriel Roco
19	CHI	FW	Bastián Sandoval
20	CHI	MF	Milovan Velásquez (loan from Colo-Colo)

No.		Position	Player
21	CHI	DF	Bruno Gutiérrez (loan from Colo-Colo)
22	CHI	GK	Eryin Sanhueza
23	CHI	MF	Matías Marín (loan from Belgrano)
24	ARG	FW	Fabricio Díaz
25	CHI	FW	Daniel Cordero
26	CHI	DF	Fernando Dinamarca
27	CHI	FW	Cristóbal Sepúlveda
28	CHI	MF	Joan Orellana (loan from Universidad Católica)
29	CHI	DF	Matías Pinto (loan from Colo-Colo)
30	CHI	MF	Ángel Carvajal
31	CHI	GK	José Tapia
33	ARG	DF	Rafael Delgado
34	ARG	DF	Ian Rasso
35	CHI	MF	Martín Zepeda
36	CHI	MF	Benjamín Contreras
37	ARG	FW	Agustín Bitancurt
38	CHI	GK	Ignacio Sáez (loan from Universidad de Chile)
–	ARG	DF	Andrés Zanini (loan from LDU Quito)
–	ARG	FW	Nicolás Stefanelli

Manager: Felipe Gutiérrez

=== 2026 Winter Transfers ===
==== In ====
Note: Flags indicate national team as defined under FIFA eligibility rules; some limited exceptions apply. Players may hold more than one non-FIFA nationality.

No.	Pos.	Nation	Player
2	FW	ARG	Gonzalo Figueroa (loan from Deportivo Armenio)
34	DF	ARG	Ian Rasso (from Quilmes)

No.	Pos.	Nation	Player
38	GK	CHI	Ignacio Sáez (loan from Universidad de Chile)
—	DF	CHI	Matías Pérez (loan from Lecce)

==== Out ====
Note: Flags indicate national team as defined under FIFA eligibility rules; some limited exceptions apply. Players may hold more than one non-FIFA nationality.

No.	Pos.	Nation	Player

== Managers ==
Deportes La Serena has been managed predominantly by Chilean coaches throughout its history, although Argentine and Spanish managers have also taken charge. Among its earliest coaches were Alberto Buccicardi, Sergio Lecea, Francisco Villegas, Pedro Areso and Miguel Mocciola. Buccicardi led the club during its first seasons in professional football, while Mocciola was in charge during the early 1960s, one of the most successful periods in the club's history.

The managerial position changed frequently over the following decades, with coaches such as Dante Pesce, Caupolicán Peña, Ramón Climent, José Sulantay, Alberto Quintano and Luis Santibáñez taking charge. Sulantay had two spells at the club, first in 1987–88 and later in 1995.

Gustavo Huerta managed La Serena from 1996 to 1999, one of the longer tenures of the modern era. He was followed during the early 2000s by a succession of managers including Hugo Valdivia, Miguel Ángel Gamboa and Miguel Ángel Fullana. In 2005, Víctor Hugo Castañeda was appointed and remained in charge until 2010. His five-year tenure was among the longest in club history and included La Serena's run to the semi-finals of the 2009 Clausura.

During the 2010s, La Serena was managed by coaches including Fernando Vergara, Miguel Ponce, Luis Pérez, Luis Musrri and Jaime García. Luis Marcoleta took charge in 2018 and led the club to the 2019 promotion play-offs, which ultimately resulted in La Serena's return to the Primera División after defeating Deportes Temuco on penalties in the promotion final.

Miguel Ponce returned for another spell in 2020–21, followed by Ivo Basay, Pablo Marini and Juan José Luvera. Erwin Durán was appointed in 2024 and guided La Serena to the 2024 Primera B championship, securing promotion to the top flight.

Following spells under Cristian Paulucci, Francisco Bozán and Mario Sciacqua in 2025, former Chile international Felipe Gutiérrez took charge in 2026.

=== Chronology ===
- (Chile) Alberto Buccicardi (1956–57)
- (Chile) Sergio Lecea (1959)
- (Argentina) Francisco Villegas (1960)
- (Spain) Pedro Areso (1961)
- (Argentina) Miguel Mocciola (1962–63)
- (Chile) Sergio Lecea (1964)
- (Chile) (Spain) Francisco Molina (1965)
- (Chile) Dante Pesce (1968)
- (Argentina) Miguel Mocciola (1970)
- (Argentina) Donato Hernández (1971)
- (Chile) Caupolicán Peña (1973)
- (Chile) Ramón Climent (1979)
- (Argentina) Juan Pinnola 1980
- (Chile) Dante Pesce (1980)
- (Chile) Juan Rodríguez Vega (1983)
- (Chile) Hugo Valdivia (1986)
- (Chile) Jorge Venegas (1987)
- (Chile) José Sulantay (1987–88)
- (Chile) Germán Cornejo (1988)
- (Chile) Alberto Quintano (1988–89)
- (Chile) Luis Santibáñez (1989)
- (Chile) José Santos Arias (1990–91)
- (Chile) Hugo Valdivia (1991)
- (Chile) Eddio Inostroza (1992)
- (Chile) Pedro García (1993)
- (Chile) Roberto Hernández (1993)
- (Chile) Hugo Valdivia (1994)
- (Chile) Guillermo Yávar (1994–95)
- (Chile) José Sulantay (1995)
- (Chile) Gustavo Huerta (1996–99)
- (Chile) Dante Pesce (1999)
- (Chile) Iván Castillo (1999)
- (Chile) Claudio Mendoza (2000)
- (Chile) Hugo Valdivia (2000)
- (Chile) Hugo Solís (2000–01)
- (Palestine) (Chile) Nicola Hadwa (2002)
- (Chile) Miguel Ángel Gamboa (2003)
- (Chile) Jorge Silva (2003–04)
- (Chile) Danilo Chacón (2004)
- (Argentina) Miguel Ángel Fullana (2004)
- (Chile) Dagoberto Olivares (2004–05)
- (Chile) Víctor Hugo Castañeda (2005–10)
- (Chile) Fernando Vergara (2011)
- (Chile) Miguel Ponce (2011-2012)
- (Chile) Marcelo Caro (2012)
- (Chile) Gonzalo Benavente (2013)
- (Chile) Christian Muñoz (2013)
- (Chile) Sergio Carmona (2013)
- (Chile) Luis Pérez (2013–14)
- (Chile) Horacio Rivas (2014-2015)
- (Chile) Luis Musrri (2015-2016)
- (Chile) Jaime García (2016–17)
- (Argentina) (Chile) Ariel Pereyra (2018)
- (Chile) Luis Marcoleta (2018–19)
- (Chile) Francisco Bozán (2020)
- (Chile) Miguel Ponce (2020–21)
- (Chile) Ivo Basay (2021–22)
- (Argentina) Pablo Marini (2022)
- (Argentina) Juan José Luvera (2023)
- (Chile) Erwin Durán (2024–25)
- (Argentina) Cristian Paulucci (2025)
- (Chile) Francisco Bozán (2025)
- (Argentina) Mario Sciacqua (2025)
- (Chile) Felipe Gutiérrez (2026–)

== Club honors ==
- Copa de Preparación

1960

- Primera B de Chile

1957, 1987, 1996
