= Intendente Alvear =

- Town
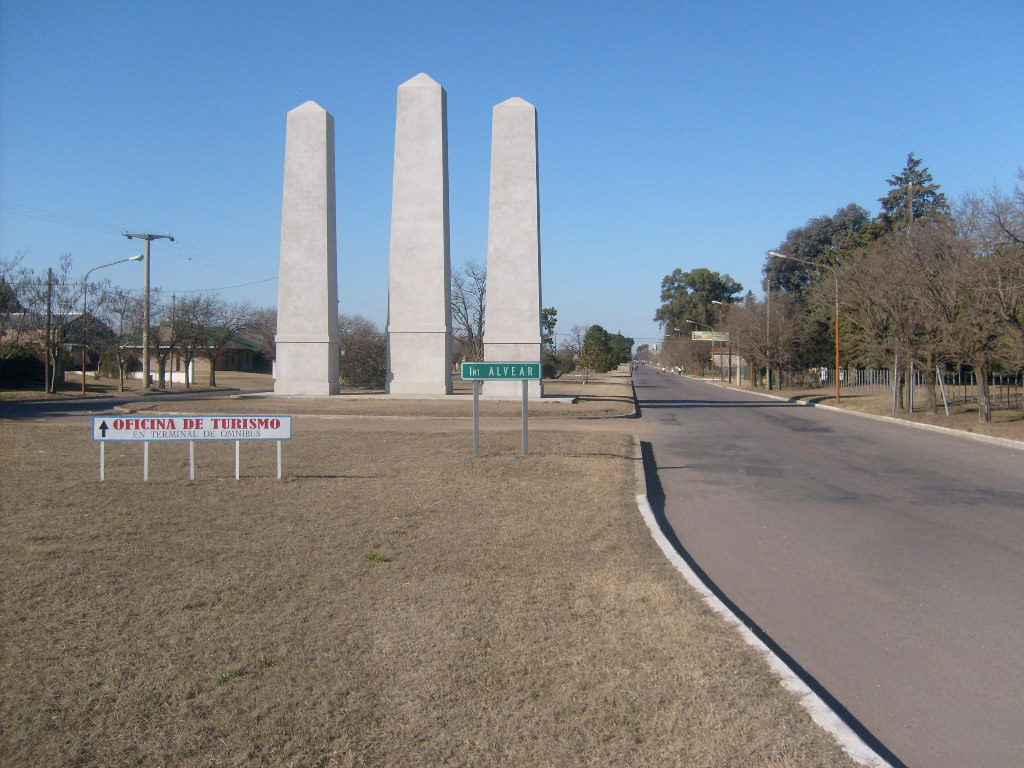
- Intendente Alvear

- Location within Argentina
- Country: Argentina
- Province: La Pampa Province
- Time zone: UTC−3 (ART)

Intendente Alvear is a town in La Pampa Province in Argentina.
