= 2026 Club Deportivo Universidad Católica season =

86th season in existence of Club Deportivo Universidad Católica

Universidad Católica
2026 season
- President: Juan Tagle (until 20 April); Matías Claro (from 20 April)
- Head coach: Daniel Garnero
- Stadium: Claro Arena
- League: 3rd
- Copa Chile: Round of 16
- Copa de la Liga: Group stage
- Supercopa de Chile: 2nd
- Libertadores: Round of 16
- Top goalscorer: League: Fernando Zampedri (29); All: Fernando Zampedri (39)
- Highest home attendance: 18,812 v. Boca Juniors; Libertadores, 7 April 2026
- Lowest home attendance: 7,596 v. Everton; Copa Chile, 30 June 2026
- Average home league attendance: 15,100
- Biggest win: 6–1 v. Palestino (H); League, 2 April 2026
- Biggest defeat: 4–0 v. San Luis (A); Copa Chile, 11 July 2026
- All statistics correct as of 12 November 2026.

The 2026 Club Deportivo Universidad Católica season is the 86th season and the club's 52th consecutive season in the top flight of Chilean football. In addition to the domestic league, Universidad Católica also competed in the Copa Chile, Copa de la Liga, Supercopa de Chile and the Copa Libertadores.

The current season signifies Universidad Católica's official return to the Copa Libertadores, thereby concluding a hiatus that had extended since the club's last participation in 2022. Furthermore, it represents the first full season in which the renovated Claro Arena functions as the exclusive venue for all home fixtures, following its closure in 2022 and its reopening in August of the previous year, coinciding with the initiation of the second phase of the Liga de Primera season.

== Kits ==
Supplier: Puma / Sponsor: Banco BICE / Sleeve sponsor: 1xBet, Sodimac, Samsung, Smart Fit and Leapmotor.

Home	Home alt.	Away	Away alt.	Third	Special edition

Goalkeeper	Goalkeeper	Goalkeeper

=== Kit information ===
Puma enters its second consecutive year as Universidad Católica's official kit supplier, having succeeded Under Armour at the start of the 2024 season.

- Home: The club unveiled its new home kit for the 2026 season on December 12, 2025. Featuring the traditional blue and white colors, the jersey's iconic horizontal blue band showcases a four-tone gradient. In a departure from last season, the band has returned to its traditional position across the chest, after having been situated higher up on the torso during the previous campaign. The kit is completed with a white body and sleeves, blue shorts, and white socks.
- Away: The season's away kit was officially unveiled on January 29, 2026. Inspired by the club's 1990s editions, the design moves away from last season's navy blue, returning to the traditional red; notably, the horizontal stripe was not included on the jersey this time. The garment showcases a white collar and sleeves detailed with a blue and white blend. The full kit is complemented by white shorts for the men's squad and red shorts for the women's team, paired with blue socks.
- Third: On April 2nd, during the pre-match build-up against Palestino, the third kit for the season was unveiled. The launch featured a massive tifo displayed by the fans in the stands. The jersey boasts an intense electric blue color, featuring neon lightning bolts across the entire shirt. It sports a white collar and matching cuffs, though the traditional stripe is not featured on this shirt.
- Commemorative: On August 21, 2026, marking the first anniversary of the inauguration of the Claro Arena, Puma unveiled a commemorative special-edition kit. The apparel features a black tone with subtle gray nuances, inspired by Crusader armor.

== Squad ==
=== First team ===
As of 8 November 2026

N	Nat.	Position	Name	Age	Signed in	Ends	Previous Club	App	Goals	Assists	Notes
Goalkeepers
1	(Chile)	GK	Vicente Bernedo	25	2021	2027	Cobreloa	76	0	1	Originally from academy
27	(Chile)	GK	Darío Melo	33	2025	2026	Deportes Melipilla	13	0	0	
Defenders
2	(Chile)	DF	Daniel González	24	2022	2026	Santiago Wanderers	124	3	3	
3	(Chile)	DF	Eugenio Mena	38	2023	2026	Racing Club	117	3	10	
4	(Chile)	DF	Ignacio Pérez	20	2025	2028	Academy	8	0	0	
6	(Chile)	DF	Sebastián Arancibia	20	2025	2028	Academy	42	1	2	
15	(Chile)	DF	Cristián Cuevas	31	2022	2026	Huachipato	161	6	26	
19	(Chile)	DF	Branco Ampuero	33	2017	2026	Deportes Antofagasta	212	7	2	
21	(Argentina)	DF	Agustín García Basso	34	2026	2026	Racing Club	9	0	0	
23	(Chile)	DF	Tomás Asta-Buruaga	30	2020	2026	Everton	111	4	2	
26	(Argentina)	DF	Juan Ignacio Díaz	28	2026	2026	O'Higgins	26	2	1	
28	(Chile)	DF	Bernardo Cerezo	31	2026	2026	Ñublense	22	1	0	
34	(Chile)	DF	Francisco Daza	18	2025	2028	Academy	1	0	0	
39	(Chile)	DF	Nicolás L’Huillier	21	2026	2027	Deportes Concepción	11	0	0	Originally from academy
42	(United States)	DF	Nickolas Pino	20	2025	2028	Academy	1	0	0	Second nationality: Chilean
44	(Chile)	DF	José Ignacio Salas	18	2025	2028	Academy	3	0	0	
Midfielders
5	(Argentina)	MF	Agustín Farías	38	2024	2026	Palestino	72	0	0	Second nationality: Chilean
8	(Argentina)	MF	Fernando Zuqui	34	2024	2026	Estudiantes	64	2	10	
10	(Argentina)	MF	Matías Palavecino	28	2026	2028	Coquimbo Unido	44	4	12	
13	(Chile)	MF	Alfred Canales	26	2024	2026	Magallanes	84	4	2	
14	(Chile)	MF	Jimmy Martínez	29	2026	2026	Huachipato	41	3	4	
17	(Chile)	MF	Gary Medel	39	2025	2026	Boca Juniors	128	11	13	Originally from academy
20	(Colombia)	MF	Jhojan Valencia	30	2025	2027	Austin	79	1	10	
47	(Chile)	MF	Vasco León	20	—		Academy	1	0	0	
Forwards
7	(Argentina)	FW	Justo Giani	27	2026	2026	Aldosivi	48	16	12	
9	(Argentina)	FW	Fernando Zampedri (c)	38	2020	2027	Rosario Central	271	178	17	Second nationality: Chilean
11	(Chile)	FW	Clemente Montes	25	2019	2027	Academy	162	24	15	
18	(Chile)	FW	Juan Francisco Rossel	21	2023	2026	Academy	65	5	1	Second nationality: Ecuadorian
22	(Argentina)	MF	Martín Gómez	20	2026	2026	Real Pilar	24	4	2	
25	(Chile)	FW	Diego Corral	21	2023	2027	Academy	63	8	4	
30	(Chile)	FW	Diego Valencia	26	2025	2026	Salernitana	172	35	16	Originally from academy
43	(Chile)	FW	Amaro Pérez	17	2025	2028	Academy	1	0	0	
Player(s) on loan during this season
36	(Chile)	MF	Bryan González	23	2022	2026	Unión San Felipe	26	0	1	Originally from academy
46	(Chile)	MF	Vicente Cárcamo	21	2025	2029	Academy	9	0	0	

=== Reserve team ===
N	Nat.	Position	Name	Age	Signed in	Ends	Previous Club	Notes
24	(Chile)	GK	Francisco Valdés	20	2025	2028	Academy	
24	(Chile)	GK	Martín Contreras	21	2024	2027	Academy	
50	(Chile)	GK	Matías Meza	19	—		Academy	
—	(Chile)	GK	Cristóbal del Río	16	2026	2029	Academy	
37	(Chile)	DF	Joaquín Meneses	18	2025	2028	Academy	
46	(South Africa)	DF	Jeffrey Sekgota	19	2025	2028	Academy	Second nationality: Chilean
48	(Chile)	DF	Diego Bermúdez	19	—		Academy	
—	(Chile)	DF	Gabriel Rodríguez	18	2026	2029	Academy	
49	(Chile)	DF	Raimundo Vega	20	—		Academy	
—	(Chile)	DF	Martín Barrios	17	2026	2029	Academy	
—	(Chile)	MF	Vicente Olivares	19	—		Academy	
47	(Chile)	MF	Mathías Contreras	18	—		Academy	
52	(Chile)	MF	Lucas Barraza	18	—		Academy	
38	(Colombia)	FW	Nicolás Girón	19	2025	2028	Academy	Second nationality: Chilean
—	(Chile)	FW	Matías Moreno	19	—		Academy	
45	(Chile)	FW	Amaro Riveros	15	2026	2029	Academy	
—	(Chile)	FW	Bayron Lizama	17	2026	2029	Academy	
20	(Chile)	FW	Mathias Langenbach	17	—		Academy	
—	(Chile)	FW	Luciano Soto	17	2026	2029	Academy	

== Contracts and transfers ==
=== New contracts ===
Date	Pos.	Name	Contract length	Contract ends	Ref.
5 December 2025	DF	(Chile) Branco Ampuero	1-year	2026	
5 December 2025	MF	(Chile) Gary Medel	1-year	2026	
5 December 2025	FW	(Chile) Fernando Zampedri	2-year	2027	
18 December 2025	GK	(Chile) Darío Melo	1-year	2026	
18 December 2025	DF	(Chile) Eugenio Mena	1-year	2026	
18 December 2025	MF	(Colombia) Jhojan Valencia	2-year	2027	
8 January 2026	MF	(Chile) Agustín Farías	1-year	2026	
8 January 2026	FW	(Chile) Clemente Montes	2-year	2027	
13 January 2026	DF	(Chile) Tomás Asta-Buruaga	1-year	2026	
13 June 2026	MF	(Argentina) Fernando Zuqui	6-months	2026	
29 August 2026	DF	(Chile) Gabriel Rodríguez	3-year	2029	
8 September 2026	GK	(Chile) Cristóbal del Río	3-year	2029	
8 September 2026	FW	(Chile) Bayron Lizama	3-year	2029	
8 September 2026	FW	(Chile) Amaro Riveros	3-year	2029	
25 September 2026	FW	(Argentina) Justo Giani	3-year	2029	
7 November 2026	DF	(Chile) Martín Barrios	3-year	2029	
7 November 2026	FW	(Chile) Luciano Soto	3-year	2029	

=== Transfers in ===
Date	Pos.	Name	From	Type	Ref.
19 December 2025	FW	(Argentina) Justo Giani	(Argentina) Aldosivi	Free transfer	
19 December 2025	MF	(Chile) Jimmy Martínez	Huachipato	Free transfer	
19 December 2025	DF	(Chile) Bernardo Cerezo	Ñublense	Free transfer	
22 December 2025	MF	(Argentina) Matías Palavecino	Coquimbo Unido	Free transfer	
31 December 2025	MF	(Chile) Bryan González	Unión San Felipe	End of loan	
31 December 2025	DF	(Chile) Nicolás L'Huillier	Deportes Concepción	End of loan	
12 January 2026	DF	(Argentina) Juan Ignacio Díaz	O'Higgins	Free transfer	
13 Agustu 2026	DF	(Argentina) Agustín García Basso	(Argentina) Racing Club	Free transfer	

=== Transfers out ===
Date	Pos.	Name	From	Type	Ref.
3 November 2025	DF	(Chile) Valber Huerta	Retired	Contract terminated	
16 December 2024	DF	(Chile) Dylan Escobar	Coquimbo Unido	End of loan	
31 December 2025	DF	(Chile) Luis Muñoz	San Luis	Contract terminated	
16 January 2026	FW	(Venezuela) Eduard Bello	(Ecuador) Barcelona	End of loan	

=== Loans in ===
Date	Pos.	Name	From	End date	Ref.
15 January 2026	MF	(Argentina) Martín Gómez	(Argentina) Real Pilar	31 December 2026	

=== Loans out ===
Date	Pos.	Name	From	End date	Ref.
16 June 2025	DF	(Chile) Guillermo Soto	(Argentina) Tigre	30 June 2026	
1 January 2026	MF	(Chile) Joan Orellana	Deportes La Serena	31 December 2026	
2 January 2026	MF	(Chile) Jorge Ortiz	Deportes Copiapó	31 December 2026	
13 January 2026	FW	(Chile) Martín Hiriart	Unión La Calera	31 December 2026	
14 January 2026	MF	(Venezuela) Leenhan Romero	Deportes Concepción	31 December 2026	
18 February 2026	MF	(Chile) Nicolás Letelier	Trasandino	31 December 2026	
25 February 2026	FW	(Chile) Bastián Gómez	Deportes Linares	31 December 2026	
25 February 2026	DF	(Chile) Felipe Mercado	Deportes Linares	31 December 2026	
1 March 2026	FW	(Chile) Axel Cerda	Concón National	31 December 2026	
15 March 2026	FW	(Chile) Milan Tudor	San Marcos de Arica	31 December 2026	
24 June 2026	MF	(Chile) Bryan González	Unión San Felipe	31 December 2026	
4 July 2026	MF	(Chile) Vicente Cárcamo	Deportes Limache	31 December 2026	

== Competitions ==
=== Overview ===
Competition	First match	Last match	Starting round	Final position	Record							
Competition	First match	Last match	Starting round	Final position	Pld	W	D	L	GF	GA	GD	Win %
League	1 February 2026	TBD	Matchday 1	TBD	27	15	4	8	56	37	+19	55.56
Copa Chile	20 June 2026	26 September 2026	Group stage	Round of 16	9	6	2	1	15	10	+5	66.67
Copa de la Liga	22 March 2026	6 June 2026	Group stage	Group stage	6	3	2	1	13	7	+6	50.00
Supercopa de Chile	20 January 2026	25 January 2026	Semifinals	2nd	2	1	1	0	4	2	+2	50.00
Copa Libertadores	7 April 2026	18 August 2026	Group stage	Round of 16	8	4	2	2	9	8	+1	50.00
Total					52	29	11	12	97	64	+33	55.77

Last updated: 8 November 2026
Source: Soccerway

=== Liga de Primera ===
==== League table ====
Pos	Team	Pld	W	D	L	GF	GA	GD	Pts	Qualification or relegation
1	Colo-Colo (C, Q)	27	19	4	4	59	30	+29	61	Qualification for Copa Libertadores group stage
2	Universidad de Chile (X)	27	15	6	6	47	22	+25	51	Qualification for Copa Libertadores group stage
3	Universidad Católica (X)	27	15	4	8	56	37	+19	49	Qualification for Copa Libertadores play-off
4	Deportes Limache	27	12	4	11	48	40	+8	40	Qualification for Copa Sudamericana first stage
5	Everton	27	11	7	9	43	35	+8	40	Qualification for Copa Sudamericana first stage

Updated to match(es) played on 8 November 2026. Source: Campeonato Chileno, Soccerway
Rules for classification: 1) Points, 2) Playoff game (only if needed to decide championship between two teams), 3) Goal difference, 4) Matches won, 5) Goals for, 6) Away goals for, 7) Red cards, 8) Yellow cards, 9) Drawing of lots.
(C) Champions; (Q) Qualified for the phase indicated; (X) Assured of Copa Sudamericana, but may still qualify for Copa Libertadores

==== Results summary ====
Overall								Home						Away					
Pld	W	D	L	GF	GA	GD	Pts	W	D	L	GF	GA	GD	W	D	L	GF	GA	GD
27	15	4	8	56	37	+19	49	8	3	3	34	17	+17	7	1	5	22	20	+2

Source: Primera Division

==== Results by round ====
Round	1	2	3	4	5	6	7	8	9	10	11	12	13	14	15	16	17	18	19	20	21	22	23	24	25	26	27	28	29	30
Ground	A	H	A	H	A	A	H	H	A	H	A	A	H	A	H	H	A	H	A	H	H	A	A	H	A	H	H	A	H	A
Result	D	W	L	W	W	L	D	W	W	L	L	W	L	W	W	D	L	W	W	L	W	W	W	D	L	W	W			
Position	6	4	11	5	2	4	4	3	3	4	5	4	4	2	2	2	3	3	3	3	2	2	2	3	3	3	3			

Source: Primera Division
A = Away; H = Home; W = Win; D = Draw; L = Loss; F = Free round

==== Matches ====
The match schedule was released on 9 January 2026.

1 February 2026 1	Deportes La Serena	2–2	Universidad Católica	La Serena
18:00 UTC−3	Chamorro 33', 38'	Report	Giani 45+2'; Zampedri 85'	Stadium: La Portada; Attendance: 5,578; Referee: Piero Maza Mathias Riquelme

8 February 2026 2	Universidad Católica	2–0	Deportes Concepción	Las Condes
20:30 UTC−3	Zampedri 51'; Giani 71'	Report		Stadium: Claro Arena; Attendance: 15,461; Referee: Christián Garay

14 February 2026 3	Cobresal	3–2	Universidad Católica	El Salvador
20:30 UTC−3	Nadruz 3'; Carvallo 14'; Pino 50'	Report	Zampedri 44' (pen.), 90+7'	Stadium: El Cobre; Attendance: 712; Referee: José Cabero

21 February 2026 4	Universidad Católica	3–1	Coquimbo Unido	Las Condes
20:30 UTC−3	Giani 35'; Zampedri 48', 70' (pen.)	Report	Camargo 19'	Stadium: Claro Arena; Attendance: 16,459; Referee: Franco Jiménez

1 March 2026 5	Ñublense	1–2	Universidad Católica	Chillán
20:30 UTC−3	Jeraldino 26' (pen.)	Report	Zampedri 45+10' (pen.), 90'	Stadium: Nelson Oyarzún Arenas; Attendance: 7,385; Referee: Fernando Vejar

7 March 2026 6	O'Higgins	1–0	Universidad Católica	Rancagua
20:30 UTC−3	Yáñez 37'	Report		Stadium: El Teniente; Attendance: 7,438; Referee: Juan Lara

14 March 2026 7	Universidad Católica	2–2	Everton	Las Condes
20:30 UTC−3	Zampedri 45+5'; Martínez 73'	Report	Palacios 4'; Soto 7'	Stadium: Claro Arena; Attendance: 17,705; Referee: Rodrigo Carvajal

2 April 2026 8	Universidad Católica	6–1	Palestino	Las Condes
18:00 UTC−3	Giani 9', 63'; Palavecino 32'; Zampedri 66', 90'; Montes 72'	Report	Munder 22'	Stadium: Claro Arena; Attendance: 14,371; Referee: Cristián Garay

11 April 2026 9	Audax Italiano	3–4	Universidad Católica	La Florida
17:30 UTC−4	Chiaverano 4'; Troyansky 28'; Collao 53'	Report	Montes 11'; Giani 33'; Palavecino 41'; Díaz 89'	Stadium: Bicentenario; Attendance: 3,934; Referee: Diego Flores

20 April 2026 10	Universidad Católica	1–2	Unión La Calera	Las Condes
20:30 UTC−4	Ampuero 44'	Report	Cáseres 52'; Sáez 82'	Stadium: Claro Arena; Attendance: 15,620; Referee: Nicolás Gamboa

25 April 2026 11	Universidad de Chile	1–0	Universidad Católica	Nuñoa
18:00 UTC−4	Lucero 16'	Report		Stadium: Nacional; Attendance: 45,000; Referee: Diego Flores

16 May 2026 12	Deportes Limache	0–2	Universidad Católica	Quillota
20:00 UTC−4		Report	Zampedri 6'; Rossel 38'	Stadium: Lucio Fariña; Attendance: 4,456; Referee: Héctor Jona

24 May 2026 13	Universidad Católica	1–2	Colo-Colo	Las Condes
18:00 UTC−4	Vidal 8' (o.g.)	Report	Correa 42', 45+1'	Stadium: Claro Arena; Attendance: 18,516; Referee: José Cabero

31 May 2026 14	Huachipato	0–3	Universidad Católica	Talcahuano
15:00 UTC−4		Report	Montes 51'; Giani 77'; Corral 90+6'	Stadium: Huachipato-CAP; Attendance: 4,628; Referee: Mathias Riquelme

14 June 2026 15	Universidad Católica	5–1	Universidad de Concepción	Las Condes
17:30 UTC−4	Zampedri 24', 40', 60'; Cuevas 68'; Giani 80'	Report	Fuentealba 45+4'	Stadium: Claro Arena; Attendance: 15,212; Referee: Héctor Jona

25 July 2026 16	Universidad Católica	3–3	Deportes La Serena	Las Condes
20:00 UTC−4	Zampedri 28' (pen.), 90+9'; Mena 40'	Report	Figueroa 72', 86'; Marín 80'	Stadium: Claro Arena; Attendance: 13,872; Referee: José Cabero

2 August 2026 17	Deportes Concepción	3–0	Universidad Católica	Concepción
12:30 UTC−4	Montecinos 10'; Larrivey 31'; Rodríguez 69'	Report		Stadium: Ester Roa Rebolledo; Attendance: 11,261; Referee: Diego Flores

7 August 2026 18	Universidad Católica	2–0	Cobresal	Las Condes
20:30 UTC−4	Pacheco 60' (o.g.); Zampedri 90+5'	Report		Stadium: Claro Arena; Attendance: 13,911; Referee: Juan Lara

26 August 2026 19	Coquimbo Unido	1–2	Universidad Católica	Coquimbo
18:00 UTC−4	Johansen 40'	Report	Zampedri 69'; Gómez 79'	Stadium: Francisco Sánchez; Attendance: 5,902; Referee: Cristián Garay

22 August 2026 20	Universidad Católica	1–2	Ñublense	Las Condes
20:00 UTC−4	Zampedri 75' (pen.)	Report	Calderón 48'; Jeraldino 88'	Stadium: Claro Arena; Attendance: 15,144; Referee: Diego Flores

31 August 2026 21	Universidad Católica	3–2	O'Higgins	Las Condes
20:45 UTC−4	Zampedri 26', 40' (pen.); Gómez 87'	Report	Morales 13'; Castillo 70'	Stadium: Claro Arena; Attendance: 13,243; Referee: Piero Maza

5 September 2026 22	Everton	0–1	Universidad Católica	Viña del Mar
17:30 UTC−4		Report	Zampedri 35'	Stadium: Sausalito; Attendance: 8,863; Referee: José Cabero

12 September 2026 23	Palestino	2–3	Universidad Católica	La Cisterna
20:00 UTC−4	Roco 29'; Abrigo 57'	Report	Zampedri 2', 73' (pen.); Corral 22'	Stadium: Municipal; Attendance: 4,555; Referee: Cristián Garay

28 October 2026 24	Universidad Católica	1–1	Audax Italiano	Las Condes
20:30 UTC−4	Zampedri 28'	Report	Pinares 55' (pen.)	Stadium: Claro Arena; Attendance: 10,131; Referee: Mathias Riquelme

25 October 2026 25	Unión La Calera	3–1	Universidad Católica	La Calera
15:00 UTC−4	Sáez 45+3'; Ferreyra 58'; Oyarzo 90+7'	Report	Zampedri 40' (pen.)	Stadium: Nicolás Chahuán; Attendance: 2,957; Referee: Cristián Garay

1 November 2026 26	Universidad Católica	1–0	Universidad de Chile	Las Condes
12:30 UTC−4	Montes 4'	Report		Stadium: Claro Arena; Attendance: 17,521; Referee: Diego Flores

8 November 2026 27	Universidad Católica	3–0	Deportes Limache	Las Condes
12:30 UTC−4	Zampedri 23' (pen.), 45+4'; Asta-Buruaga 31'	Report		Stadium: Claro Arena; Attendance: 14,242; Referee: Franco Jimenez

2026 28	Colo-Colo	v	Universidad Católica	Macul
				Stadium: Monumental David Arellano

2026 29	Universidad Católica	v	Huachipato	Las Condes
				Stadium: Claro Arena

2026 30	Universidad de Concepción	v	Universidad Católica	Concepción
				Stadium: Ester Roa Rebolledo

=== Copa Chile ===
==== Group stage ====
Pos	Team	Pld	W	D	L	GF	GA	GD	Pts	Qualification	UC	EVE	SLQ	CDC
1	Universidad Católica	6	5	0	1	14	9	+5	15	Advance to the knockout stage	—	2–1	4–2	2–1
2	Everton	6	2	2	2	10	9	+1	8	Advance to the knockout stage	1–3	—	2–2	3–0
3	San Luis	6	1	3	2	11	10	+1	6		4–0	2–2	—	1–1
4	Deportes Copiapó	6	1	1	4	3	10	−7	4		0–3	0–1	1–0	—

Source: Campeonato Chileno, Soccerway
Legend: Blue = home team win; Yellow = draw; Red = away team win.
Rules for classification: 1) Points; 2) Goal difference; 3) Matches won; 4) Goals for; 5) Away goals for; 6) Red cards; 7) Yellow cards; 8) Copa Chile ranking; 9) Drawing of lots.

23 June 2026 1	Everton	1–3	Universidad Católica	Viña del Mar
20:30 UTC−4	Magallanes 57'	Report	Arancibia 7'; Corral 26'; Zampedri 31'	Stadium: Sausalito; Attendance: 5,065; Referee: Diego Flores

30 June 2026 2	Universidad Católica	2–1	Everton	Las Condes
20:30 UTC−4	Giani 35', 58'	Report		Stadium: Claro Arena; Attendance: 7,596; Referee: Mathias Riquelme

14 June 2026 3	Deportes Copiapó	0–3	Universidad Católica	Copiapó
17:30 UTC−4		Report	Palavecino 21'; Zampedri 52'; Montes 79'	Stadium: Estadio Luis Valenzuela Hermosilla; Referee: Fernando Vejar

27 June 2026 4	Universidad Católica	4–2	San Luis	Las Condes
20:00 UTC−4	Zampedri 29'; Corral 33'; Cerezo 52'; Ampuero 82'	Report	Muñoz 3'; Cerezo 90+4' (o.g.)	Stadium: Claro Arena; Attendance: 8,594; Referee: Piero Maza

4 July 2026 5	Universidad Católica	2–1	Deportes Copiapó	Las Condes
20:30 UTC−4	Valencia 61'; Gómez 70'	Report	Tabilo 40'	Stadium: Claro Arena; Attendance: 9,470; Referee: Rodrigo Carvajal

11 July 2026 6	San Luis	4–1	Universidad Católica	Quillota
17:30 UTC−4	González 12'; Vergara 58'; Parada 87'; Catalán 90+4'	Report		Stadium: Lucio Fariña; Attendance: 4,123; Referee: Manuel Vergara

==== Round of 16 ====
23 September 2026	Unión La Calera	1–1	Universidad Católica	La Calera
20:30 UTC−3	Salomoni 79'	Report	Gómez 64'	Stadium: Municipal Nicolás Chahuán Nazar; Referee: Franco Jiménez

26 September 2026	Universidad Católica	0–0 (1–1 agg.) (2–4 p)	Unión La Calera	Las Condes, Santiago
20:00 UTC−3		Report		Stadium: Claro Arena; Attendance: 10,436; Referee: Diego Flores
	Penalties
	Zampedri (penalty scored); Valencia (penalty scored); Cuevas (penalty missed); Giani (penalty missed)		(penalty scored) Díaz; (penalty scored) Moya; (penalty scored) Oyarzo; (penalty scored) Avellaneda

=== Copa de la Liga ===
The Copa de la Liga is a cup competition organised by the Asociación Nacional de Fútbol Profesional (ANFP), played from 2026. The group stage draw was held on 8 January 2026.

==== Group stage ====
Pos	Team	Pld	W	D	L	GF	GA	GD	Pts	Qualification	ÑUB	UC	UDC	CSL
1	Ñublense	6	4	2	0	9	3	+6	14	Advance to the semi-finals	—	1–0	2–1	2–0
2	Universidad Católica	6	3	2	1	13	7	+6	11		1–1	—	2–1	5–1
3	Universidad de Concepción	6	1	1	4	7	11	−4	4		0–2	2–2	—	2–1
4	Cobresal	6	1	1	4	6	14	−8	4		1–1	1–3	2–1	—

Source: Campeonato Chileno, Soccerway
Legend: Blue = home team win; Yellow = draw; Red = away team win.
Rules for classification: 1) Points; 2) Goal difference; 3) Matches won; 4) Goals for; 5) Away goals for; 6) Red cards; 7) Yellow cards; 8) Seeding.

22 March 2026 1	Universidad Católica	2–1	Universidad de Concepción	Las Condes
18:00 UTC−3	Giani 45+2' (pen.); Valencia 75'	Report	Mesías 23'	Stadium: Claro Arena; Attendance: 16,156; Referee: Gastón Philippe

25 March 2026 2	Ñublense	1–0	Universidad Católica	Chillán
18:00 UTC−3	Ávalos 45+2'	Report		Stadium: Nelson Oyarzún Arenas; Attendance: 4,50; Referee: José Cabero

30 March 2026 3	Cobresal	1–3	Universidad Católica	El Salvador
18:00 UTC−3	Moreno 48'	Report	Montes 11'; Giani 32'; Zampedri 64' (pen.)	Stadium: El Cobre; Attendance: 394; Referee: Nicolás Millas

3 May 2026 4	Universidad de Concepción	2–2	Universidad Católica	Concepción
12:30 UTC−4	Urzi 3'; Retamal 81'		Palavecino 13'; Corral 29'	Stadium: Ester Roa Rebolledo; Attendance: 7,500; Referee: Mario Salvo

10 May 2026 5	Universidad Católica	1–1	Ñublense	Las Condes
17:30 UTC−4	Giani 31'	Report	Ávalos 90+6'	Stadium: Claro Arena; Attendance: 12,473; Referee: José Cabero

6 June 2026 6	Universidad Católica	5–1	Cobresal	Las Condes
18:00 UTC−4	Canales 44'; Corral 54'; Giani 59'; Martínez 63'; Rossel 90'	Report	Pino 22' (pen.)	Stadium: Claro Arena; Attendance: 12,762; Referee: Franco Jiménez

=== Supercopa de Chile ===
The tournament feature the winners and runners-up of the 2025 Liga de Primera and 2025 Copa Chile. The competition was held from 20 to 25 January 2026 at Estadio Sausalito in Viña del Mar.

20 January 2026 Semi-finals	Huachipato	2–4	Universidad Católica	Viña del Mar
19:00 UTC−3	Altamirano 40', 67' (pen.)	Report	Zampedri 57', 90'; Montes 74'; Giani 90+6'	Stadium: Estadio Sausalito; Referee: Franco Jiménez

25 January 2026 Final	Universidad Católica	0–0 (7–8 p)	Coquimbo Unido	Viña del Mar
19:00 UTC−3		Report		Stadium: Estadio Sausalito; Referee: Cristián Garay
	Penalties
	Zampedri (penalty scored); Corral (penalty missed); Martínez (penalty scored); Asta-Buruaga (penalty scored); Giani (penalty scored); Farías (penalty scored); González (penalty scored); Mena (penalty missed); Medel (penalty scored); Ampuero (penalty missed)		(penalty scored) Galani; (penalty missed) Riveros; (penalty scored) Cornejo; (penalty scored) Pratto; (penalty scored) Sánchez; (penalty scored) Cabrera; (penalty scored) Rodríguez; (penalty missed) Salinas; (penalty scored) Hernández; (penalty scored) Camargo

=== Copa Libertadores ===
==== Group stage ====
Universidad Católica will enter the competition in the group stage. The draw was held on 19 March 2026, 20:00 PYT (UTC−3), at the CONMEBOL Convention Centre in Luque, Paraguay.

Pos	Team	Pld	W	D	L	GF	GA	GD	Pts	Qualification	UCA	CRU	BOC	BSC
1	(Chile) Universidad Católica	6	4	1	1	8	4	+4	13	Advance to round of 16	—	0–0	1–2	2–0
2	(Brazil) Cruzeiro	6	3	2	1	8	3	+5	11	Advance to round of 16	1–2	—	1–0	4–0
3	(Argentina) Boca Juniors	6	2	1	3	6	5	+1	7	Transfer to Copa Sudamericana	0–1	1–1	—	3–0
4	(Ecuador) Barcelona	6	1	0	5	2	12	−10	3		1–2	0–1	1–0	—

Source: CONMEBOL
Rules for classification: 1) Points; 2) Head-to-head points; 3) Head-to-head goal difference; 4) Head-to-head goals scored; 5) Goal difference; 6) Goals scored; 7) Red cards; 8) Yellow cards; 9) Drawing of lots.

7 April 2026 1	Universidad Católica (Chile)	1–2	(Argentina) Boca Juniors	Claro Arena, Santiago
20:30 UTC−4	Díaz 83'	Report	Paredes 16'; Bareiro 65'	Attendance: 18,812; Referee: Gustavo Tejera (Uruguay)

15 April 2026 2	Cruzeiro (Brazil)	1–2	(Chile) Universidad Católica	Mineirão, Belo Horizonte
18:00 UTC−4	Matheus Pereira 60' (pen.)	Report	Giani 29'; Martínez 90+4'	Attendance: 43,929; Referee: Carlos Betancur (Colombia)

29 April 2026 3	Barcelona (Ecuador)	1–2	(Chile) Universidad Católica	Monumental Isidro, Guayaquil
19:00 UTC−5	Céliz 79'	Report	Zampedri 17'; Montes 22'	Referee: Roberto Pérez (Peru)

6 May 2026 4	Universidad Católica (Chile)	0–0	(Brazil) Cruzeiro	Claro Arena, Santiago
22:00 UTC−4		Report		Attendance: 17,839; Referee: Andrés Rojas (Colombia)

21 May 2026 5	Universidad Católica (Chile)	2–0	(Ecuador) Barcelona	Claro Arena, Santiago
20:30 UTC−4	Zampedri 77', 84'	Report		Attendance: 18,407; Referee: Juan Gabriel Benítez (Paraguay)

28 May 2026 6	Boca Juniors (Argentina)	0–1	(Chile) Universidad Católica	La Bombonera, Buenos Aires
21:30 UTC−3		Report	Montes 34'	Referee: Wilmar Roldán (Colombia)

==== Round of 16 ====
11 August 2026	Estudiantes (Argentina)	1–1	(Chile) Universidad Católica	Estadio Jorge Luis Hirschi, La Plata
21:30 UTC−3	Tobio Burgos 4'	Report	Zampedri 80'	Referee: Raphael Claus (Brazil)

18 August 2026	Universidad Católica (Chile)	0–3	(Argentina) Estudiantes	Claro Arena, Santiago
20:30 UTC−4		Report	Correa 44'; Carrillo 53', 83'	Attendance: 18,236; Referee: Wilmar Roldán (Colombia)

== Statistics ==
=== Squad statistics ===
No.	Pos.	Player	League		Copa Chile		League Cup		Supercopa		Copa Libertadores		Total	
No.	Pos.	Player	Apps	Goals	Apps	Goals	Apps	Goals	Apps	Goals	Apps	Goals	Apps	Goals
Goalkeepers
1	GK	(Chile) Vicente Bernedo	21	0	6	0	2	0	2	0	8	0	39	0
27	GK	(Chile) Darío Melo	6	0	2	0	4	0	0	0	0	0	12	0
Defenders
2	DF	(Chile) Daniel González	13	0	6	0	4	0	2	0	7	0	32	0
3	DF	(Chile) Eugenio Mena	18	1	2	0	3	0	2	0	8	0	33	1
4	DF	(Chile) Ignacio Pérez	1	0	0	0	0	0	0	0	0	0	1	0
6	DF	(Chile) Sebastián Arancibia	14	0	3	1	1	0	0	0	6	0	24	1
15	DF	(Chile) Cristián Cuevas	24	1	8	0	6	0	2	0	7	0	47	1
19	DF	(Chile) Branco Ampuero	23	1	4	1	5	0	2	0	8	0	42	2
21	DF	(Argentina) Agustín García Basso	7	0	2	0	0	0	0	0	0	0	9	0
23	DF	(Chile) Tomás Asta-Buruaga	9	1	0	0	0	0	2	0	0	0	11	1
26	DF	(Argentina) Juan Ignacio Díaz	16	1	2	0	2	0	1	0	5	1	26	2
28	DF	(Chile) Bernardo Cerezo	10	0	6	1	4	0	1	0	1	0	22	1
34	DF	(Chile) Francisco Daza	1	0	0	0	0	0	0	0	0	0	1	0
39	DF	(Chile) Nicolás L'Huillier	5	0	4	0	2	0	0	0	0	0	11	0
42	DF	(Chile) Nickolas Pino	0	0	1	0	0	0	0	0	0	0	1	0
44	DF	(Chile) José Ignacio Salas	0	0	0	0	1	0	0	0	0	0	1	0
Midfielders
5	MF	(Chile) Agustín Farías	14	0	7	0	4	0	1	0	5	0	31	0
8	MF	(Argentina) Fernando Zuqui	17	0	6	0	4	0	0	0	8	0	35	0
10	MF	(Argentina) Matías Palavecino	24	2	8	1	4	1	2	0	6	0	44	4
13	MF	(Chile) Alfred Canales	11	0	7	0	6	1	0	0	2	0	26	1
14	MF	(Chile) Jimmy Martínez	23	1	6	0	3	1	2	0	7	1	41	3
17	MF	(Chile) Gary Medel	10	0	0	0	3	0	2	0	4	0	19	0
20	MF	(Colombia) Jhojan Valencia	24	0	6	1	4	0	2	0	8	0	44	1
49	MF	(Chile) Vasco León	0	0	1	0	0	0	0	0	0	0	1	0
Forwards
7	FW	(Argentina) Justo Giani	27	8	6	2	5	4	2	1	8	1	48	16
9	FW	(Chile) Fernando Zampedri	26	29	7	3	4	1	2	2	7	4	46	39
11	FW	(Chile) Clemente Montes	19	4	2	1	5	1	2	1	7	2	35	9
18	FW	(Chile) Juan Francisco Rossel	12	1	4	0	4	1	0	0	2	0	22	2
22	FW	(Argentina) Martín Gómez	13	2	6	2	3	0	0	0	2	0	24	4
25	FW	(Chile) Diego Corral	19	2	8	2	4	2	1	0	4	0	36	6
30	FW	(Chile) Diego Valencia	6	0	0	0	3	1	1	0	1	0	11	1
43	FW	(Chile) Amaro Pérez	0	0	1	0	0	0	0	0	1	0	1	0
Player(s) on loan during this season
36	MF	(Chile) Bryan González	0	0	1	0	0	0	0	0	0	0	1	0
46	MF	(Chile) Vicente Cárcamo	4	0	1	0	1	0	0	0	0	0	6	0

*Last updated: 8 November 2026
- Source: Soccerway

^{†} Player left Universidad Católica during the season

=== Goals ===
Rank	No.	Pos.	Player	League	Copa Chile	League Cup	Supercopa	Copa Libertadores	Total
1	9	FW	(Chile) Fernando Zampedri	29	3	1	2	4	39
2	7	FW	(Argentina) Justo Giani	8	2	4	1	1	16
3	11	FW	(Chile) Clemente Montes	4	1	1	1	2	9
4	25	FW	(Chile) Diego Corral	2	2	2	0	0	6
5	10	MF	(Argentina) Matías Palavecino	2	1	1	0	0	4
=	22	MF	(Argentina) Martín Gómez	2	2	0	0	0	4
6	14	MF	(Chile) Jimmy Martínez	1	0	1	0	1	3
7	19	DF	(Chile) Branco Ampuero	1	1	0	0	0	2
=	10	DF	(Argentina) Juan Ignacio Díaz	1	0	0	0	1	2
=	18	FW	(Chile) Juan Francisco Rossel	1	0	1	0	0	2
8	3	DF	(Chile) Eugenio Mena	1	0	0	0	0	1
=	6	DF	(Chile) Sebastián Arancibia	0	1	0	0	0	1
=	15	DF	(Chile) Cristián Cuevas	1	0	0	0	0	1
=	28	DF	(Chile) Bernardo Cerezo	0	1	0	0	0	1
=	13	MF	(Chile) Alfred Canales	0	0	1	0	0	1
=	30	FW	(Chile) Diego Valencia	0	1	0	0	0	1
=	20	MF	(Colombia) Jhojan Valencia	0	0	1	0	0	1
=	23	DF	(Chile) Tomás Asta-Buruaga	1	0	0	0	0	1
			Own goal	2	0	0	0	0	1
Total				56	15	13	4	9	97

*Last updated: 8 November 2026
- Source: Soccerway

=== Penalty kicks ===
Includes only penalty kicks taken during matches.

Rank	No.	Pos.	Player	League	Copa Chile	League Cup	Supercopa	Copa Libertadores	Total
1	9	FW	(Chile) Fernando Zampedri	9 / 9	0 / 0	1 / 1	0 / 0	0 / 0	10 / 10
2	10	FW	(Argentina) Matías Palavecino	0 / 0	0 / 1	1 / 1	0 / 0	0 / 0	1 / 2
3	7	FW	(Argentina) Justo Giani	0 / 0	0 / 0	1 / 2	0 / 0	0 / 0	1 / 2
Total				9 / 9	0 / 1	3 / 4	0 / 0	0 / 0	12 / 14

*Last updated: 8 November 2026
- Source: Soccerway

=== Assists ===
Rank	No.	Pos.	Player	League	Copa Chile	League Cup	Supercopa	Copa Libertadores	Total
1	10	MF	(Argentina) Matías Palavecino	6	3	1	1	1	12
=	7	FW	(Argentina) Justo Giani	5	4	1	0	2	12
8	15	MF	(Chile) Cristián Cuevas	7	0	1	0	0	8
3	11	FW	(Chile) Clemente Montes	4	0	0	0	2	6
=	9	FW	(Chile) Fernando Zampedri	3	2	0	1	0	6
=	8	MF	(Argentina) Fernando Zuqui	2	2	1	0	1	6
4	25	FW	(Chile) Diego Corral	3	0	1	0	0	4
=	14	MF	(Chile) Jimmy Martínez	4	0	0	0	0	4
5	20	MF	(Colombia) Jhojan Valencia	0	0	2	0	1	3
6	3	DF	(Chile) Eugenio Mena	0	1	0	0	1	2
=	22	MF1	(Argentina) Martín Gómez	1	0	1	0	0	2
=	2	DF	(Chile) Daniel González	1	1	0	0	0	2
7	10	DF	(Argentina) Juan Ignacio Díaz	1	0	0	0	0	1
=	18	FW	(Chile) Juan Francisco Rossel	0	0	1	0	0	1
7	30	FW	(Chile) Diego Valencia	1	0	0	0	0	1
1	1	GK	(Chile) Vicente Bernedo	1	0	0	0	0	1
Total				39	13	9	2	8	71

*Last updated: 8 November 2026
- Source: Soccerway

=== Clean sheets ===
Rank	No.	Pos.	Player	League	Copa Chile	League Cup	Supercopa	Copa Libertadores	Total
1	1	GK	(Chile) Vicente Bernedo	5 / 21	2 / 6	0 / 2	1 / 2	3 / 8	11 / 39
2	27	GK	(Chile) Darío Melo	2 / 6	0 / 2	0 / 4	0 / 0	0 / 0	2 / 12
Total				7 / 27	2 / 8	0 / 6	1 / 2	3 / 8	13 / 51

*Last updated: 8 November 2026
- Source: Soccerway

=== Penalty kick saves ===
Includes only penalty kicks saves during matches.

Rank	No.	Pos.	Player	League	Copa Chile	League Cup	Supercopa	Copa Libertadores	Total
1	27	GK	(Chile) Darío Melo	0 / 2	0 / 0	1 / 2	0 / 0	0 / 0	1 / 4
2	1	GK	(Chile) Vicente Bernedo	0 / 1	0 / 0	0 / 0	0 / 1	0 / 1	0 / 3
Total				0 / 3	0 / 0	1 / 2	0 / 1	0 / 1	1 / 7

*Last updated: 8 November 2026
- Source: Soccerway

=== Disciplinary record ===
Rk.	No.	Player	League			League Cup			Copa Chile			Supercopa			Copa Libertadores			Total		
Rk.	No.	Player	Yellow card	Second yellow card	Red card	Yellow card	Second yellow card	Red card	Yellow card	Second yellow card	Red card	Yellow card	Second yellow card	Red card	Yellow card	Second yellow card	Red card	Yellow card	Second yellow card	Red card
1	10	(Argentina) Matías Palavecino	3	1	0	0	0	2	1	0	0	0	0	0	1	0	0	5	1	2
2	8	(Argentina) Fernando Zuqui	3	0	2	0	0	0	3	0	0	0	0	0	2	0	0	8	0	2
3	11	(Chile) Clemente Montes	2	1	1	1	0	0	1	0	0	0	0	0	1	0	0	5	1	1
4	14	(Chile) Jimmy Martínez	4	0	1	0	0	0	0	0	0	0	0	0	0	0	0	4	0	1
5	2	(Chile) Daniel González	0	0	0	1	0	0	0	0	1	0	0	0	0	0	0	1	0	1
6	7	(Argentina) Justo Giani	4	0	0	0	0	0	2	1	0	0	0	0	2	0	0	8	1	0
7	26	(Argentina) Juan Ignacio Díaz	5	1	0	0	0	0	1	0	0	0	0	0	0	0	0	6	1	0
8	44	(Chile) Jose Ignacio Salas	0	0	0	1	1	0	0	0	0	0	0	0	0	0	0	1	1	0
9	20	(Colombia) Jhojan Valencia	9	0	0	0	0	0	4	0	0	2	0	0	3	0	0	18	0	0
10	15	(Chile) Cristián Cuevas	11	0	0	1	0	0	2	0	0	0	0	0	3	0	0	17	0	0
11	9	(Chile) Fernando Zampedri	7	0	0	2	0	0	2	0	0	0	0	0	3	0	0	14	0	0
12	19	(Chile) Branco Ampuero	8	0	0	1	0	0	1	0	0	1	0	0	0	0	0	11	0	0
13	28	(Chile) Bernardo Cerezo	3	0	0	1	0	0	3	0	0	0	0	0	0	0	0	7	0	0
14	17	(Chile) Gary Medel	3	0	0	2	0	0	0	0	0	1	0	0	0	0	0	6	0	0
15	5	(Chile) Agustín Farías	1	0	0	0	0	0	2	0	0	0	0	0	1	0	0	4	0	0
16	25	(Chile) Diego Corral	3	0	0	0	0	0	0	0	0	0	0	0	0	0	0	3	0	0
17	1	(Chile) Vicente Bernedo	1	0	0	0	0	0	0	0	0	0	0	0	1	0	0	2	0	0
=	3	(Chile) Eugenio Mena	1	0	0	1	0	0	0	0	0	0	0	0	0	0	0	2	0	0
18	6	(Chile) Sebastián Arancibia	1	0	0	0	0	0	0	0	0	0	0	0	0	0	0	1	0	0
=	23	(Chile) Tomás Asta-Buruaga	1	0	0	0	0	0	0	0	0	0	0	0	0	0	0	1	0	0
=	39	(Chile) Nicolás L'Huillier	1	0	0	0	0	0	0	0	0	0	0	0	0	0	0	1	0	0
=	42	(Chile) Nickolas Pino	0	0	0	0	0	0	1	0	0	0	0	0	0	0	0	1	0	0
=	13	(Chile) Alfred Canales	1	0	0	0	0	0	0	0	0	0	0	0	0	0	0	1	0	0
=	18	(Chile) Juan F. Rossel	1	0	0	0	0	0	0	0	0	0	0	0	0	0	0	1	0	0
Total			73	3	4	11	1	2	23	1	1	4	0	0	15	0	0	128	5	7

*Last updated: 8 November 2026
- Source: Soccerway
