= 2026 Copa Chile =

Copa Chile Coca-Cola Zero Azúcar 2026

Tournament details
- Country: Chile
- Dates: 30 January – TBD 2026
- Teams: 32

Tournament statistics
- Matches played: 119
- Goals scored: 324 (2.72 per match)
- Top goal scorer(s): Brayan Hurtado; Maximiliano Romero (8 goals each)
- All statistics correct as of 5 November 2026.

The 2026 Copa Chile, officially known as Copa Chile Coca-Cola Zero Azúcar 2026 for sponsorship purposes, is the 46th edition of the Copa Chile, the country's national football cup tournament. The tournament began on 30 January 2026.

Huachipato were the defending champions, but were eliminated in the group stage after placing third in their group.

== Format ==
The Copa Chile continued being played only by the 16 Liga de Primera and 16 Liga de Ascenso teams, leaving out teams from Segunda División Profesional and amateur sides and keeping the format used in its previous edition. In the group stage, the 32 participating teams were divided into eight groups of four according to geographical location, with each of the two geographical zones in which the competition has been split (North and South) being allocated four groups. The top two teams in each group advanced to the knockout stages (round of 16, quarter-finals, semi-finals, and final).

== Prizes ==
The Copa Chile champions, provided that they compete in the top flight in the 2027 season, will face the team placing third in the 2026 Liga de Primera in a play-off match for a berth into the Copa Libertadores second stage. The loser of that play-off match will be entitled to claim a Copa Sudamericana berth. This is a change from previous seasons in which the Copa Chile champions were awarded a spot in the Copa Libertadores by winning the cup tournament.

In addition to this, the champions will qualify to play the 2027 Supercopa de Chile.

== Schedule ==
The schedule for the competition is as follows:

Round	Draw date	First leg	Second leg
Group stage	22 January 2026	Matchday 1 (Liga de Ascenso): 30 January – 1 February 2026; Matchday 2 (Liga de Ascenso): 6–8 February 2026; Matchday 3: 19–21 June 2026; Matchday 1 (Liga de Primera): 23–25 June 2026; Matchday 4: 26–29 June 2026; Matchday 2 (Liga de Primera): 30 June – 2 July 2026; Matchday 5: 4–6 July 2026; Matchday 6: 11 July – 26 August 2026	
Round of 16	No draw	22–24 September 2026	25 September – 7 October 2026
Quarter-finals	No draw	29 September – 4 November 2026	4 October – 24 November 2026
Semi-finals	No draw	TBD 2026	
Final	No draw	TBD 2026	

== Teams ==
Thirty-two clubs take part in this edition of the Copa Chile: 16 from Liga de Primera and 16 from Liga de Ascenso, with their Copa Chile ranking in brackets.

=== Liga de Primera ===
- Audax Italiano (11)
- Cobresal (14)
- Colo-Colo (1)
- Coquimbo Unido (12)
- Deportes Concepción (33)
- Deportes La Serena (21)
- Deportes Limache (41)
- Everton (8)
- Huachipato (9)
- Ñublense (10)
- O'Higgins (13)
- Palestino (6)
- Unión La Calera (25)
- Universidad Católica (5)
- Universidad de Chile (2)
- Universidad de Concepción (15)

=== Liga de Ascenso ===
- Cobreloa (7)
- Curicó Unido (22)
- Deportes Antofagasta (19)
- Deportes Copiapó (30)
- Deportes Iquique (17)
- Deportes Puerto Montt (20)
- Deportes Recoleta (39)
- Deportes Santa Cruz (32)
- Deportes Temuco (18)
- Magallanes (4)
- Rangers (24)
- San Luis (29)
- San Marcos de Arica (28)
- Santiago Wanderers (16)
- Unión Española (3)
- Unión San Felipe (26)

== Group stage ==
The first two group stage matchdays were played by the Liga de Ascenso teams, with the Liga de Primera sides entering the competition on the third matchday, played in June 2026.

=== Group A ===
Pos	Team	Pld	W	D	L	GF	GA	GD	Pts	Qualification	COQ	IQQ	LIM	SMA
1	Coquimbo Unido	6	3	3	0	8	3	+5	12	Advance to the knockout stage	—	3–0	1–1	1–0
2	Deportes Iquique	6	3	2	1	12	6	+6	11	Advance to the knockout stage	1–1	—	3–1	4–0
3	Deportes Limache	6	2	2	2	11	11	0	8		1–1	1–4	—	4–1
4	San Marcos de Arica	6	0	1	5	2	13	−11	1		0–1	0–0	1–3	—

Source: Campeonato Chileno, Soccerway
Legend: Blue = home team win; Yellow = draw; Red = away team win.
Rules for classification: 1) Points; 2) Goal difference; 3) Matches won; 4) Goals for; 5) Away goals for; 6) Red cards; 7) Yellow cards; 8) Copa Chile ranking; 9) Drawing of lots.

=== Group B ===
Pos	Team	Pld	W	D	L	GF	GA	GD	Pts	Qualification	UC	EVE	SLQ	CDC
1	Universidad Católica	6	5	0	1	14	9	+5	15	Advance to the knockout stage	—	2–1	4–2	2–1
2	Everton	6	2	2	2	10	9	+1	8	Advance to the knockout stage	1–3	—	2–2	3–0
3	San Luis	6	1	3	2	11	10	+1	6		4–0	2–2	—	1–1
4	Deportes Copiapó	6	1	1	4	3	10	−7	4		0–3	0–1	1–0	—

Source: Campeonato Chileno, Soccerway
Legend: Blue = home team win; Yellow = draw; Red = away team win.
Rules for classification: 1) Points; 2) Goal difference; 3) Matches won; 4) Goals for; 5) Away goals for; 6) Red cards; 7) Yellow cards; 8) Copa Chile ranking; 9) Drawing of lots.

=== Group C ===
Pos	Team	Pld	W	D	L	GF	GA	GD	Pts	Qualification	ANT	COB	DLS	CSL
1	Deportes Antofagasta	6	5	1	0	12	5	+7	16	Advance to the knockout stage	—	2–1	4–2	1–0
2	Cobreloa	6	2	2	2	7	6	+1	8	Advance to the knockout stage	0–0	—	1–0	2–0
3	Deportes La Serena	6	2	1	3	7	10	−3	7		2–4	2–1	—	0–0
4	Cobresal	6	0	2	4	2	7	−5	2		0–1	2–2	0–1	—

Source: Campeonato Chileno, Soccerway
Legend: Blue = home team win; Yellow = draw; Red = away team win.
Rules for classification: 1) Points; 2) Goal difference; 3) Matches won; 4) Goals for; 5) Away goals for; 6) Red cards; 7) Yellow cards; 8) Copa Chile ranking; 9) Drawing of lots.

=== Group D ===
Pos	Team	Pld	W	D	L	GF	GA	GD	Pts	Qualification	UCH	ULC	USF	SW
1	Universidad de Chile	6	4	1	1	13	7	+6	13	Advance to the knockout stage	—	0–1	2–0	4–1
2	Unión La Calera	6	3	2	1	13	6	+7	11	Advance to the knockout stage	3–3	—	0–2	4–0
3	Unión San Felipe	6	2	1	3	6	8	−2	7		0–1	1–1	—	2–1
4	Santiago Wanderers	6	1	0	5	7	18	−11	3		2–3	0–4	3–1	—

Source: Campeonato Chileno, Soccerway
Legend: Blue = home team win; Yellow = draw; Red = away team win.
Rules for classification: 1) Points; 2) Goal difference; 3) Matches won; 4) Goals for; 5) Away goals for; 6) Red cards; 7) Yellow cards; 8) Copa Chile ranking; 9) Drawing of lots.

=== Group E ===
Pos	Team	Pld	W	D	L	GF	GA	GD	Pts	Qualification	CC	OHI	REC	UE
1	Colo-Colo	6	4	1	1	15	8	+7	13	Advance to the knockout stage	—	3–2	2–2	3–0
2	O'Higgins	6	3	2	1	13	8	+5	11	Advance to the knockout stage	4–1	—	1–1	1–1
3	Deportes Recoleta	6	1	2	3	6	11	−5	5		0–3	1–3	—	0–1
4	Unión Española	6	1	1	4	4	11	−7	4		0–3	1–2	1–2	—

Source: Campeonato Chileno, Soccerway
Legend: Blue = home team win; Yellow = draw; Red = away team win.
Rules for classification: 1) Points; 2) Goal difference; 3) Matches won; 4) Goals for; 5) Away goals for; 6) Red cards; 7) Yellow cards; 8) Copa Chile ranking; 9) Drawing of lots.

=== Group F ===
Pos	Team	Pld	W	D	L	GF	GA	GD	Pts	Qualification	ÑUB	CUR	RAN	UDC
1	Ñublense	6	4	1	1	9	5	+4	13	Advance to the knockout stage	—	2–2	1–0	4–2
2	Curicó Unido	6	3	2	1	10	7	+3	11	Advance to the knockout stage	1–0	—	0–1	2–2
3	Rangers	6	2	0	4	4	7	−3	6		0–1	1–2	—	2–1
4	Universidad de Concepción	6	1	1	4	8	12	−4	4		0–1	1–3	2–0	—

Source: Campeonato Chileno, Soccerway
Legend: Blue = home team win; Yellow = draw; Red = away team win.
Rules for classification: 1) Points; 2) Goal difference; 3) Matches won; 4) Goals for; 5) Away goals for; 6) Red cards; 7) Yellow cards; 8) Copa Chile ranking; 9) Drawing of lots.

=== Group G ===
Pos	Team	Pld	W	D	L	GF	GA	GD	Pts	Qualification	DSC	AUD	PAL	MAG
1	Deportes Santa Cruz	6	4	1	1	11	6	+5	13	Advance to the knockout stage	—	2–1	0–0	4–1
2	Audax Italiano	6	4	0	2	9	7	+2	12	Advance to the knockout stage	0–1	—	3–2	2–1
3	Palestino	6	3	1	2	12	9	+3	10		3–2	1–2	—	4–1
4	Magallanes	6	0	0	6	5	15	−10	0		1–2	0–1	1–2	—

Source: Campeonato Chileno, Soccerway
Legend: Blue = home team win; Yellow = draw; Red = away team win.
Rules for classification: 1) Points; 2) Goal difference; 3) Matches won; 4) Goals for; 5) Away goals for; 6) Red cards; 7) Yellow cards; 8) Copa Chile ranking; 9) Drawing of lots.

=== Group H ===
Pos	Team	Pld	W	D	L	GF	GA	GD	Pts	Qualification	DCO	DPM	HUA	TEM
1	Deportes Concepción	6	4	1	1	10	6	+4	13	Advance to the knockout stage	—	2–0	3–2	2–0
2	Deportes Puerto Montt	6	3	1	2	8	6	+2	10	Advance to the knockout stage	2–0	—	2–1	1–1
3	Huachipato	6	2	0	4	7	9	−2	6		1–2	0–2	—	2–0
4	Deportes Temuco	6	1	2	3	4	8	−4	5		1–1	2–1	0–1	—

Source: Campeonato Chileno, Soccerway
Legend: Blue = home team win; Yellow = draw; Red = away team win.
Rules for classification: 1) Points; 2) Goal difference; 3) Matches won; 4) Goals for; 5) Away goals for; 6) Red cards; 7) Yellow cards; 8) Copa Chile ranking; 9) Drawing of lots.

== Knockout stage ==
=== Bracket ===
Round of 16
25	Unión La Calera (p)	1	0	1 (4)
5	Universidad Católica	1	0	1 (2)
7	Cobreloa	1	1	2
12	Coquimbo Unido	2	2	4
17	Deportes Iquique	1	1	2
19	Deportes Antofagasta	1	4	5
8	Everton	0	1	1
2	Universidad de Chile	1	1	2
22	Curicó Unido	0	0	0
33	Deportes Concepción	4	2	6
13	O'Higgins	2	3	5
32	Deportes Santa Cruz	1	1	2
20	Deportes Puerto Montt	2	1	3
10	Ñublense	0	2	2
11	Audax Italiano	0	0	0
1	Colo-Colo	0	1	1

Quarter-finals
25	Unión La Calera	0
12	Coquimbo Unido	2
19	Deportes Antofagasta	2	0	2
2	Universidad de Chile	0	4	4
33	Deportes Concepción	0	0	0
13	O'Higgins	1	2	3
20	Deportes Puerto Montt	0	0	0
1	Colo-Colo	1	3	4

Semi-finals
Winner S1
2	Universidad de Chile
13	O'Higgins
1	Colo-Colo

Final
Winner F1
Winner F2

=== Round of 16 ===
Team 1	Agg.	Team 2	1st leg	2nd leg
Cobreloa	2–4	Coquimbo Unido	1–2	1–2
Unión La Calera	1–1 (4–2 p)	Universidad Católica	1–1	0–0
Deportes Iquique	2–5	Deportes Antofagasta	1–1	1–4
Everton	1–2	Universidad de Chile	0–1	1–1
Audax Italiano	0–1	Colo-Colo	0–0	0–1
Deportes Puerto Montt	3–2	Ñublense	2–0	1–2
O'Higgins	5–2	Deportes Santa Cruz	2–1	3–1
Curicó Unido	0–6	Deportes Concepción	0–4	0–2

==== First leg ====
22 September 2026	Deportes Puerto Montt	2–0	Ñublense	Puerto Montt
18:00 UTC−3	Sabella 63'; Flores 72'	Report		Stadium: Regional de Chinquihue; Referee: Mario Salvo

22 September 2026	Cobreloa	1–2	Coquimbo Unido	Calama
20:30 UTC−3	Orellana 70'	Report	Cabrera 64'; Gaete 87' (o.g.)	Stadium: Zorros del Desierto; Referee: Nicolás Millas

22 September 2026	Audax Italiano	0–0	Colo-Colo	Ñuñoa, Santiago
20:30 UTC−3		Report		Stadium: Nacional Julio Martínez Prádanos; Referee: José Cabero

23 September 2026	Curicó Unido	0–4	Deportes Concepción	Curicó
18:00 UTC−3		Report	Larrivey 4' (pen.), 84'; Rodríguez 7'; Dávila 45+4'	Stadium: La Granja; Referee: Nicolás Gamboa

23 September 2026	Unión La Calera	1–1	Universidad Católica	La Calera
20:30 UTC−3	Salomoni 79'	Report	Gómez 64'	Stadium: Municipal Nicolás Chahuán Nazar; Referee: Franco Jiménez

23 September 2026	Deportes Iquique	1–1	Deportes Antofagasta	Iquique
20:30 UTC−3	Garrido 3'	Report	Bández 66'	Stadium: Tierra de Campeones; Referee: Miguel Araos

24 September 2026	O'Higgins	2–1	Deportes Santa Cruz	Rancagua
18:00 UTC−3	Castillo 4'; Yáñez 65'	Report	Brito 79'	Stadium: El Teniente; Referee: Francisco Gilabert

24 September 2026	Everton	0–1	Universidad de Chile	Viña del Mar
20:30 UTC−3		Report	Lucero 62'	Stadium: Sausalito; Referee: Piero Maza
Note: The match was suspended in the 83rd minute with Universidad de Chile leading 0–1 due to crowd disturbances. The remaining time was played on 27 September 2026, 14:45 local time at Estadio Nacional Julio Martínez Prádanos in Santiago, prior to the kickoff of the second leg.

==== Second leg ====
25 September 2026	Colo-Colo	1–0 (1–0 agg.)	Audax Italiano	Ñuñoa, Santiago
20:00 UTC−3	Díaz 34'	Report		Stadium: Nacional Julio Martínez Prádanos; Referee: Mathías Riquelme

26 September 2026	Ñublense	2–1 (2–3 agg.)	Deportes Puerto Montt	Chillán
17:30 UTC−3	Calderón 3', 52'	Report	Paredes 35' (pen.)	Stadium: Municipal Nelson Oyarzún Arenas; Referee: Matías Assadi

26 September 2026	Universidad Católica	0–0 (1–1 agg.) (2–4 p)	Unión La Calera	Las Condes, Santiago
20:00 UTC−3		Report		Stadium: Claro Arena; Referee: Diego Flores
	Penalties
	Zampedri (penalty scored); Valencia (penalty scored); Cuevas (penalty missed); Giani (penalty missed)		(penalty scored) Díaz; (penalty scored) Moya; (penalty scored) Oyarzo; (penalty scored) Avellaneda

27 September 2026	Deportes Antofagasta	4–1 (5–2 agg.)	Deportes Iquique	Antofagasta
12:30 UTC−3	Hurtado 45+6'; Leyton 52'; Bández 83'; Tapia 89'	Report	Orellana 44'	Stadium: Regional Calvo y Bascuñán; Referee: Gastón Philippe

27 September 2026	Deportes Concepción	2–0 (6–0 agg.)	Curicó Unido	Concepción
15:00 UTC−3	Espinoza 75'; Cáceres 88'	Report		Stadium: Ester Roa Rebolledo; Referee: Claudio Díaz

27 September 2026	Universidad de Chile	1–1 (2–1 agg.)	Everton	Ñuñoa, Santiago
17:30 UTC−3	Vargas 45+3'	Report	Montiel 56'	Stadium: Nacional Julio Martínez Prádanos; Referee: Nicolás Millas

27 September 2026	Deportes Santa Cruz	1–3 (2–5 agg.)	O'Higgins	Santa Cruz
20:00 UTC−3	Islame 66'	Report	Vecino 18'; Cisternas 74' (o.g.); Castillo 75'	Stadium: Municipal Joaquín Muñoz García; Referee: Héctor Jona

7 October 2026	Coquimbo Unido	2–1 (4–2 agg.)	Cobreloa	Coquimbo
19:00 UTC−3	Riveros 57'; Vadalá 69'	Report	Conelli 45+4'	Stadium: Municipal Francisco Sánchez Rumoroso; Referee: Gastón Philippe

=== Quarter-finals ===
Team 1	Agg.	Team 2	1st leg	2nd leg
Unión La Calera	S1	Coquimbo Unido	0–2	24 Nov
Deportes Antofagasta	2–4	Universidad de Chile	2–0	0–4
Deportes Puerto Montt	0–4	Colo-Colo	0–1	0–3
Deportes Concepción	0–3	O'Higgins	0–1	0–2

==== First leg ====
29 September 2026	Deportes Puerto Montt	0–1	Colo-Colo	Puerto Montt
18:00 UTC−3		Report	Pastrán 90+4'	Stadium: Regional de Chinquihue; Referee: Franco Jiménez

30 September 2026	Deportes Concepción	0–1	O'Higgins	Concepción
20:00 UTC−3		Report	Castillo 90+3'	Stadium: Ester Roa Rebolledo; Referee: Cristián Garay

7 October 2026	Deportes Antofagasta	2–0	Universidad de Chile	Antofagasta
19:00 UTC−3	Tapia 53'; Bández 57'	Report		Stadium: Regional Calvo y Bascuñán; Referee: Rodrigo Carvajal

4 November 2026	Unión La Calera	0–2	Coquimbo Unido	La Calera
19:00 UTC−3		Report	Hernández 27'; Camargo 53'	Stadium: Municipal Nicolás Chahuán Nazar; Referee: José Cabero
Note: The match, scheduled for 20 October 2026, 20:00 local time was postponed to 4 November 2026 due to poor weather conditions.

==== Second leg ====
4 October 2026	O'Higgins	2–0 (3–0 agg.)	Deportes Concepción	Rancagua
15:30 UTC−3	Castillo 76'; Schor 86'	Report		Stadium: El Teniente; Referee: Mathías Riquelme

6 October 2026	Colo-Colo	3–0 (4–0 agg.)	Deportes Puerto Montt	Macul, Santiago
20:30 UTC−3	Correa 11'; Romero 63', 89'	Report		Stadium: Monumental David Arellano; Referee: Francisco Soriano
Note: The match was suspended at halftime with Colo-Colo leading 1–0 due to heavy rain. It was set to resume on 20 October 2026, 18:00 local time but it was once again suspended and rescheduled to 2 November 2026, 19:00 local time due to bad weather.

5 November 2026	Universidad de Chile	4–0 (4–2 agg.)	Deportes Antofagasta	Independencia, Santiago
19:00 UTC−3	Rivero 45+2', 57'; Arce 77'; Vargas 80'	Report		Stadium: Santa Laura; Referee: Mathías Riquelme
Note: The match, scheduled for 21 October 2026, 19:00 local time was postponed to 5 November 2026 due to poor weather conditions.

24 November 2026	Coquimbo Unido	v	Unión La Calera	Coquimbo
19:00 UTC−3				Stadium: Municipal Francisco Sánchez Rumoroso

=== Semi-finals ===
Team 1	Agg.	Team 2	1st leg	2nd leg
Winner S1	F1	Universidad de Chile		
O'Higgins	F2	Colo-Colo		

=== Final ===
TBD 2026
--:-- UTC−3

Higher-ranked finalist	v	Lower-ranked finalist

== Statistics ==
=== Top scorers ===
As of 5 November 2026

Rank	Player	Club	Goals
1	(Venezuela) Brayan Hurtado	Deportes Antofagasta	8
1	(Argentina) Maximiliano Romero	Colo-Colo	8
3	(Paraguay) Arnaldo Castillo	O'Higgins	7
4	(Chile) Cristian Pardo	Deportes Santa Cruz	4
4	(Uruguay) Marcos Camarda	Santiago Wanderers	4
4	(Chile) Gonzalo Tapia	Palestino	4
4	(Chile) Agustín Arce	Universidad de Chile	4
4	(Uruguay) Thiago Vecino	O'Higgins	4
4	(Argentina) Joaquín Larrivey	Deportes Concepción	4

Source: BeSoccer

=== Hat-tricks ===
Player	For	Against	Result	Date
(Venezuela) Brayan Hurtado	Deportes Antofagasta	Deportes La Serena	4–2 (H)	21 June 2026

== See also ==
- 2026 Liga de Primera
- 2026 Liga de Ascenso
- 2026 Supercopa de Chile
- 2026 Copa de la Liga
