= 2026 Unión La Calera season =

Unión La Calera
2026 season
- Manager: Martín Cicotello
- Stadium: Estadio Nicolás Chahuán
- Liga de Primera: 15th
- Copa de la Liga: Group stage
- Biggest defeat: Deportes Limache 4–0 Unión La Calera

In the 2026 season, the 73rd season overall, Unión La Calera is participating in the Liga de Primera for the ninth consecutive season and also in the Copa Chile and the Copa de la Liga.

On 6 March 2026, the ANFP determined that Unión La Calera lost the matches they won against Everton on 2 February and Cobresal on 9 February due to the participation of Argentine player Axel Encinas. Under Article 31 of the league regulations, teams are allowed a maximum of five foreign players on the pitch at any time. Unión La Calera used six foreign players in both matches. The club appealed the decision, which was rejected on 8 April, making it final and enforceable locally.

== Transfers ==
=== In ===
Pos.	Player	Transferred to	Fee	Date	Source
DF	(Canada) Cristián Gutiérrez	(Chile) Deportes La Serena		1 January 2026	
DF	(Chile) Nicolás Palma	(Chile) Cobreloa		1 January 2026	
GK	(Argentina) Nicolás Avellaneda	(Argentina) Chacarita Juniors		1 January 2026	
FW	(Chile) Matías Campos López	(Chile) Everton		1 January 2026	
MF	(Chile) Bayron Oyarzo	(Chile) Ñublense		1 January 2026	
DF	(Argentina) Rodrigo Cáseres	(Argentina) San Martín de San Juan		2 January 2026	
MF	(Argentina) Juan Requena	(Venezuela) Deportivo Táchira		8 January 2026	
FW	(Argentina) Francisco José Pozzo	(Argentina) Vélez Sarsfield	Loan	8 January 2026	
DF	(Chile) Daniel Gutiérrez	(Chile) Colo-Colo	Loan	18 January 2026	
GK	(Chile) Nelson Espinoza	(Chile) Deportes Copiapó		19 January 2026	
MF	(Chile) Joan Cruz	(Spain) Real Oviedo Vetusta	Loan	19 February 2026	

== Pre-season and friendlies ==
24 January 2026	Unión La Calera	4–0	Unión Española

== Competitions ==
=== Overall record ===
Competition	First match	Last match	Starting round	Record							
Competition	First match	Last match	Starting round	Pld	W	D	L	GF	GA	GD	Win %
Liga de Primera	2 February 2026		Matchday 1	11	3	1	7	10	21	−11	27.27
Copa Chile				0	0	0	0	0	0	+0	—
Total				11	3	1	7	10	21	−11	27.27

Last updated: 24 April 2026
Source: Competitions

=== Liga de Primera ===
Pos	Team	Pld	W	D	L	GF	GA	GD	Pts	Qualification or relegation
12	Audax Italiano	23	7	7	9	26	31	−5	28	
13	O'Higgins	23	8	3	12	28	36	−8	27	
14	Cobresal	23	7	3	13	34	44	−10	24	
15	Universidad de Concepción	23	6	4	13	17	39	−22	22	Relegation to Liga de Ascenso
16	Unión La Calera	23	4	5	14	19	40	−21	17	Relegation to Liga de Ascenso

Updated to match(es) played on 2 October 2026. Source: Campeonato Chileno, Soccerway
Rules for classification: 1) Points, 2) Playoff game (only if needed to decide championship between two teams), 3) Goal difference, 4) Matches won, 5) Goals for, 6) Away goals for, 7) Red cards, 8) Yellow cards, 9) Drawing of lots.

==== Results by round ====
Round	1	2	3	4	5	6	7	8	9	10
Ground	A	H	A	H	H	A	H	A	H	A
Result	L	L	L	L	W	L	D	L	W	W
Position										

Updated to match(es) played on 24 April 2026. Source:
A = Away; H = Home; W = Win; D = Draw; L = Loss

==== Matches ====
2 February 2026 1	Everton	3–0 Awarded	Unión La Calera

9 February 2026 2	Unión La Calera	0–3 Awarded	Cobresal

15 February 2026 3	Colo-Colo	1–0	Unión La Calera

20 February 2026 4	Unión La Calera	0–1	Ñublense

27 February 2026 5	Unión La Calera	3–0	Audax Italiano

6 March 2026 6	Deportes La Serena	3–0	Unión La Calera

16 March 2026 7	Unión La Calera	3–3	O'Higgins

4 April 2026 8	Deportes Limache	4–0	Unión La Calera

14 April 2026 9	Unión La Calera	1–0	Deportes Concepción

20 April 2026 10	Universidad Católica	1–2	Unión La Calera

24 April 2026 11	Unión La Calera	1–2	Coquimbo Unido	La Calera
18:00				Stadium: Estadio Nicolás Chahuán; Referee: Miguel Araos Riquelme

=== Copa de la Liga ===
==== Group stage ====
Group D

20 March 2026 1	Unión La Calera	0–1	Audax Italiano

24 March 2026 2	Universidad de Chile	0–1	Unión La Calera

28 March 2026 3	Unión La Calera	2–1	Deportes La Serena

2 May 2026 4	Audax Italiano	1–1	Unión La Calera
12:30

10 May 2026 5	Unión La Calera	v	Universidad de Chile	La Calera
15:00				Stadium: Nicolás Chahuán Nazar Municipal Stadium
