= Ignacio Pérez (Chilean footballer) =

Chilean footballer (born 2005)

Personal information
- Full name: Ignacio Pérez Gutiérrez
- Date of birth: 6 June 2006 (age 20)
- Place of birth: Calera de Tango, Chile
- Height: 1.82 m (6 ft 0 in)
- Position: Centre-back

Team information
- Current team: Universidad Católica
- Number: 4

Youth career
- 2019–2024: Universidad Católica

Senior career*
Years	Team	Apps	(Gls)
2024–	Universidad Católica	7	(0)
- * Club domestic league appearances and goals as of 6 December 2025

Ignacio Pérez Gutiérrez (born 6 June 2006) is a Chilean professional footballer who plays as a Centre-back for Chilean club Universidad Católica.

== Club career ==
He commenced his development within the youth academy of Universidad Católica at the age of thirteen. On February 2, 2025, he formalized his first professional contract, having been affiliated with the institution since his early adolescence.

His professional debut occurred on August 16, 2025, in a Chilean Primera División Matchday 20 fixture against Colo Colo. He entered the field of play in the 83rd minute as a substitute for Cristián Cuevas, participating in his club’s 4–1 victory over the aforementioned opponent.

== International career ==
Pérez represented Chile at under-17 level in the 2023 South American U-17 Championship.

== Career statistics ==
=== Club ===
As of 6 December 2026

Appearances and goals by club, season and competition
Club	Season	League			Cup (Note: Includes Copa Chile)		League cup (Note: Includes Copa de la Liga)		Continental		Other		Total	
Club	Season	Division	Apps	Goals	Apps	Goals	Apps	Goals	Apps	Goals	Apps	Goals	Apps	Goals
Universidad Católica	2025	Liga de Primera	7	0	0	0	—		0	0	—		7	0
Universidad Católica	2026	Liga de Primera	0	0	0	0	0	0	0	0	—		0	0
Universidad Católica	Total		7	0	0	0	—		0	0	0	0	7	0
Career total			7	0	0	0	—		0	0	0	0	7	0
