= Christopher Díaz =

Christopher Díaz may refer to:

- Christopher Díaz (footballer) (born 1995), Chilean footballer
- Christopher Díaz (boxer) (born 1994), Puerto Rican boxer
- Christopher Díaz Figueroa (born 1990), tennis player from Guatemala
- Christopher Díaz, a main character on 9-1-1 (TV series)
