= Sebastián Arancibia =

Chilean footballer (born 2005)

Personal information
- Full name: Sebastián Andrés Arancibia Flores
- Date of birth: 15 June 2006 (age 20)
- Place of birth: Santiago, Chile
- Height: 1.81 m (5 ft 11 in)
- Position: Right-back

Team information
- Current team: Universidad Católica
- Number: 6

Youth career
- 2015–2025: Universidad Católica

Senior career*
Years	Team	Apps	(Gls)
2025–	Universidad Católica	15	(0)
- * Club domestic league appearances and goals as of 30 August 2025

Sebastián Andrés Arancibia Flores (born 15 June 2006) is a Chilean professional footballer who plays as a Right-back for Chilean club Universidad Católica.

== Club career ==
Growing up through the youth ranks of Universidad Católica. Arancibia made his first-team debut on 1 March 2025, replacing Cristián Cuevas in the 46 minute of a 1–0 victory against Deportes Iquique in Liga de Primera. On 8 March, Arancibia signed his contract with Universidad Católica until 2028. On 25 April, Arancibia scored his first assist for the first team in a 6–0 home win to Everton. As of September, Arancibia was sidelined for the remainder of the 2025 season due to injury.

On 24 December 2025, Arancibia was ranked 100 by CIES Football Observatory in best non-big-5 league players born in 2006 or later.

== Career statistics ==
=== Club ===
As of As of match played 21 June 2026

Appearances and goals by club, season and competition
Club	Season	League			Cup (Note: Includes Copa Chile)		League cup (Note: Includes Copa de la Liga)		Continental		Other		Total	
Club	Season	Division	Apps	Goals	Apps	Goals	Apps	Goals	Apps	Goals	Apps	Goals	Apps	Goals
Universidad Católica	2025	Primera División	15	0	3	0	—		0	0	—		18	0
Universidad Católica	2026	Primera División	5	0	0	0	1	0	5 (Note: Appearances in the Copa Libertadores)	0	—		11	0
Universidad Católica	Total		20	0	3	0	1	0	5	0	0	0	29	0
Career total			20	0	3	0	1	0	5	0	0	0	29	0
