= Bryan González =

Bryan González may refer to:

- Bryan González (Mexican footballer) (born 2003), Mexican football winger for Pachuca
- Bryan González (Chilean footballer) (born 2003), Chilean football midfielder for Universidad Católica
