= Bernardo Cerezo =

Chilean footballer (born 1995)

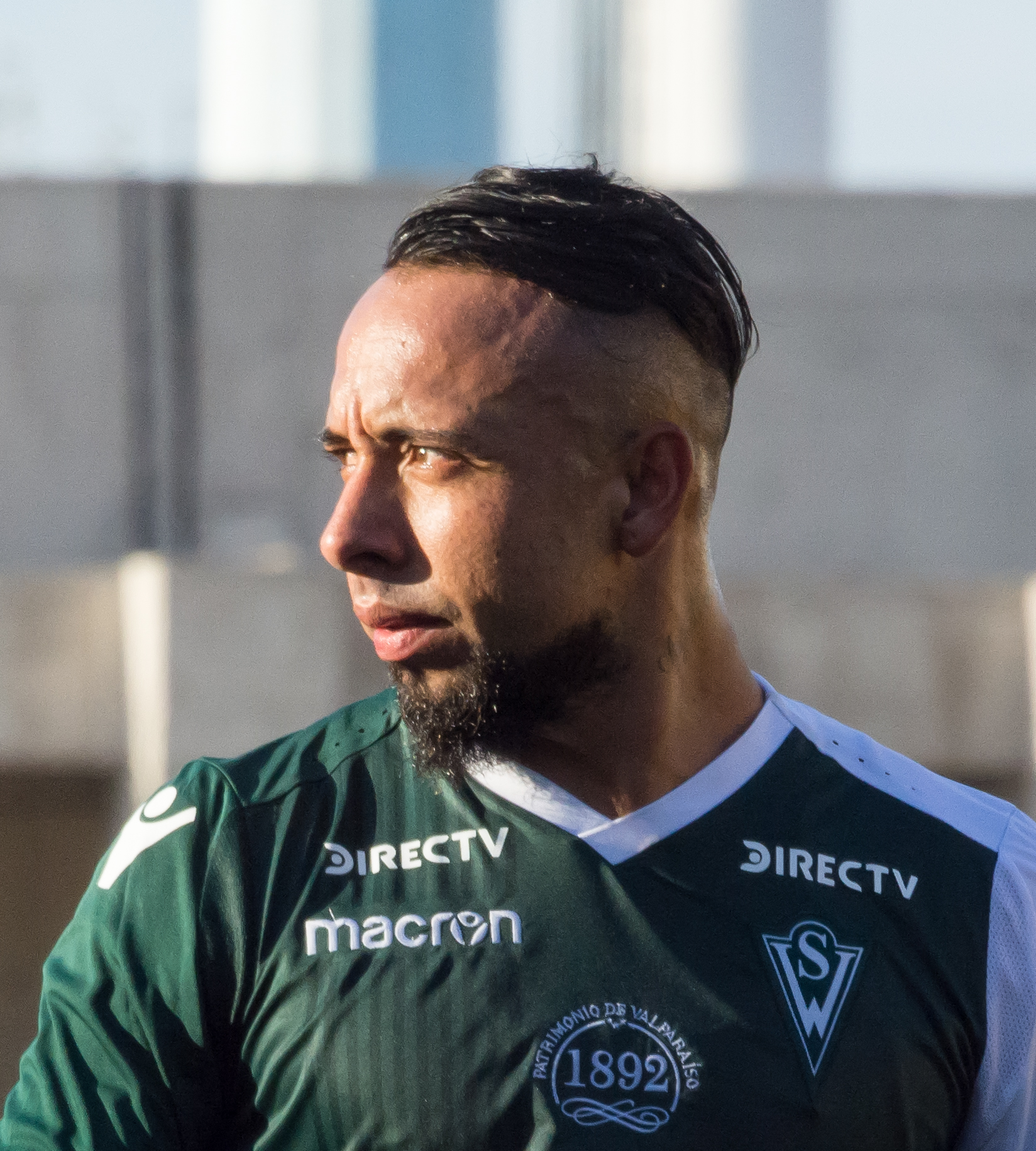
- Cerezo with Santiago Wanderers in 2019

Personal information
- Full name: Bernardo Humberto Cerezo Rojas
- Date of birth: 21 January 1995 (age 31)
- Place of birth: Taltal, Chile
- Height: 1.70 m (5 ft 7 in)
- Positions: Right back; midfielder

Team information
- Current team: Universidad Católica

Youth career
- Universidad de Chile

Senior career*
Years	Team	Apps	(Gls)
2012–2017	Universidad de Chile	1	(0)
2015–2016	→ Deportes Santa Cruz (loan)	31	(5)
2016–2017	→ Deportes La Serena (loan)	26	(1)
2017–2020	Santiago Wanderers	89	(5)
2021–2025	Ñublense	124	(10)
2026–	Universidad Católica	0	(0)

International career
2014–2015	Chile U20	4	(0)
- * Club domestic league appearances and goals as of 20 December 2025

Bernardo Humberto Cerezo Rojas (born 21 January 1995) is a Chilean footballer who plays as a right back or midfielder for Universidad Católica.

== Club career ==
He debuted on 9 September 2012 in a match against Santiago Wanderers for the 2012 Copa Chile.

Cerezo spent five seasons with Ñublense from 2021 to 2025.

On 19 December 2025, Cerezo joined Universidad Católica.

== International career ==
Cerezo represented Chile U20 at friendly tournaments in 2014 and the 2015 South American Championship.

== Career statistics ==
=== Club ===
As of As of match played 21 June 2026

Appearances and goals by club, season and competition
Club	Season	League		National cup (Note: Includes Copa Chile)		League cup (Note: Includes Copa de la Liga)		Continental		Other		Total	
Club	Season	Apps	Goals	Apps	Goals	Apps	Goals	Apps	Goals	Apps	Goals	Apps	Goals
Universidad de Chile	2012	—		4	0	—		—		—		4	0
Universidad de Chile	2013	1	0	—		—		—		—		1	0
Universidad de Chile	2013-14	—		2	0	—		—		—		2	0
Universidad de Chile	2014-15	—		1	0	—		—		—		1	0
Universidad de Chile	Total	1	0	7	0	0	0	0	0	0	0	8	0
Deportes Santa Cruz (loan)	2015-16	31	5	—		—		—		—		31	5
Deportes La Serena (loan)	2016-17	26	1	4	0	—		—		—		30	1
Santiago Wanderers	2017	11	0	8	1	—		—		—		19	1
Santiago Wanderers	2018	26	1	2	0	—		4 (Note: Appearances in Copa Libertadores)	1	1 (Note: Appearances in Supercopa de Chile)	0	33	2
Santiago Wanderers	2019	23	1	3	0	—		—		—		26	1
Santiago Wanderers	2020	31	0	—		—		—		—		31	0
Santiago Wanderers	Total	91	2	13	1	0	0	4	1	1	0	109	4
Ñublense	2021	29	3	4	0	—		—		1	0	34	3
Ñublense	2022	25	3	3	1	—		1 (Note: Appearances in Copa Sudamericana)	0	—		29	4
Ñublense	2023	25	1	—		—		10 (Note: 6 appearances in Copa Libertadores, 4 in Copa Sudamericana)	0	—		35	1
Ñublense	2024	23	3	1	0	—		—		—		24	3
Ñublense	2025	23	0	2	0	—		1	0	—		26	0
Ñublense	Total	125	10	10	1	0	0	12	0	1	0	148	11
Universidad Católica	2026	7	0	1	0	4	0	0	0	1	0	13	0
Career total		281	18	35	2	4	0	16	1	3	0	339	21
