= Matías Palavecino =

Argentine footballer

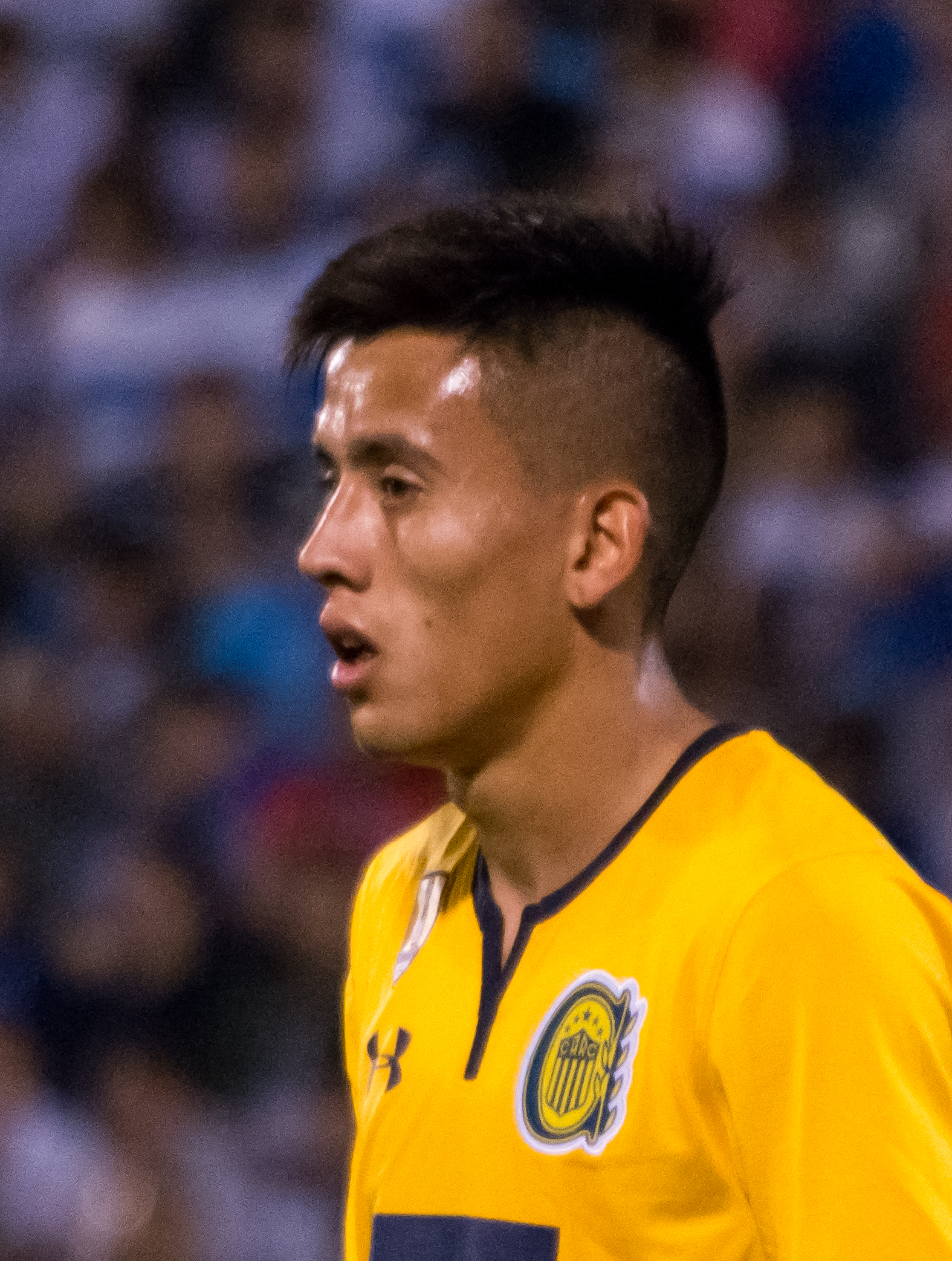
- Palavecino with Rosario Central in 2019

Personal information
- Full name: Matías Tomás Palavecino
- Date of birth: 23 May 1998 (age 28)
- Place of birth: Rosario, Argentina
- Height: 1.80 m (5 ft 11 in)
- Position: Attacking midfielder

Team information
- Current team: Universidad Católica
- Number: 10

Youth career
- Rosario Central

Senior career*
Years	Team	Apps	(Gls)
2019	Rosario Central	0	(0)
2019–2020	ASIL Lysi	14	(2)
2020	Gimnasia de Jujuy	5	(1)
2021	Patronato	15	(0)
2022	Gimnasia de Jujuy	35	(7)
2023–2025	Coquimbo Unido	46	(5)
2023–2024	→ Belgrano (loan)	7	(0)
2026–	Universidad Católica	14	(2)
- * Club domestic league appearances and goals as of 7 December 2025

Matías Tomás Palavecino (born 23 May 1998) is an Argentine professional footballer who plays as an attacking midfielder for Chilean Primera División club Universidad Católica.

== Club career ==
Palavecino started his career with Rosario Central, he was moved into their senior squad by manager Paulo Ferrari during the 2018–19 campaign. He made his senior bow on 26 February 2019 as the club were eliminated from the Copa Argentina by Sol de Mayo of Torneo Federal A, with the midfielder playing eighty-four minutes. Just over two weeks later, on 13 March, Palavecino made his Copa Libertadores debut against Universidad Católica; having previously been an unused substitute for the matchday one group stage encounter with Grêmio. In the succeeding July, Palavecino headed to Cyprus to join second tier team ASIL.

After fourteen appearances and two goals, against Karmiotissa and Aris Limassol respectively, Palavecino returned to his homeland with Primera B Nacional's Gimnasia y Esgrima in September 2020. He scored once, versus Santamarina, in five matches for El Lobo Jujeño. On 17 February 2021, Palavecino returned to the Primera División with Patronato on a free transfer; penning terms until the succeeding December. He debuted in a home defeat to Independiente on 21 February.

In December 2022, Palavecino signed with Chilean Primera División side Coquimbo Unido. In August 2023, he renewed his contract until 2025, being immediately loaned out to Belgrano in his homeland. Back to Coquimbo Unido, he won the 2025 Chilean Primera División, the first one for the club. He left them at the end of 2025.

On 22 December 2025, Palavecino signed with Universidad Católica.

== International career ==
In March 2017, Palavecino received a call-up to train with the Argentina U20s.

== Career statistics ==
As of As of match played 21 June 2026.

Appearances and goals by club, season and competition
Club	Season	League			Cup (Note: Includes Copa Argentina, Copa Chile)		League Cup (Note: Includes Copa de la Liga Profesional and Copa de la Liga)		Continental		Other		Total	
Club	Season	Division	Apps	Goals	Apps	Goals	Apps	Goals	Apps	Goals	Apps	Goals	Apps	Goals
Rosario Central	2018-19	Primera División	—		1	0	—		1 (Note: Appearance(s) in the Copa Libertadores)	0	—		2	0
ASIL	2019-20	Second Division	14	2	—		—		—		—		14	2
Gimnasia de Jujuy	2020	Primera B Nacional	5	1	—		—		—		—		5	1
Patronato	2020	Primera División	—		—		2	0	—		—		2	0
Patronato	2021	Primera División	9	0	—		6	0	—		—		15	0
Patronato	Total		9	0	—		8	0	—		—		17	0
Gimnasia de Jujuy	2022	Primera B Nacional	35	7	2	0	—		—		—		37	7
Coquimbo Unido	2023	Liga de Primera	18	1	3	2	—		—		—		21	3
Coquimbo Unido	2025	Liga de Primera	28	4	10	3	—		—		—		38	7
Coquimbo Unido	Total		46	5	13	5	—		—		—		59	10
Belgrano (loan)	2023	Primera División	—		—		5	0	1 (Note: Appearance(s) in the Copa Sudamericana)	0	—		6	0
Belgrano (loan)	2024	Primera División	—		—		2	0	—		—		2	0
Belgrano (loan)	Total		—		—		7	0	1	0	—		8	0
Universidad Católica	2026	2026	14	2	1	1	4	1	5	0	2 (Note: Appearance(s) in the Supercopa de Chile)	0	26	4
Career total			123	17	17	6	19	1	7	0	2	0	168	24

== Honours ==
Coquimbo Unido

- Chilean Primera División: 2025

Individual

- Chilean Primera División Ideal Team: 2025
