= Jimmy Martínez =

Chilean footballer (born 1997)

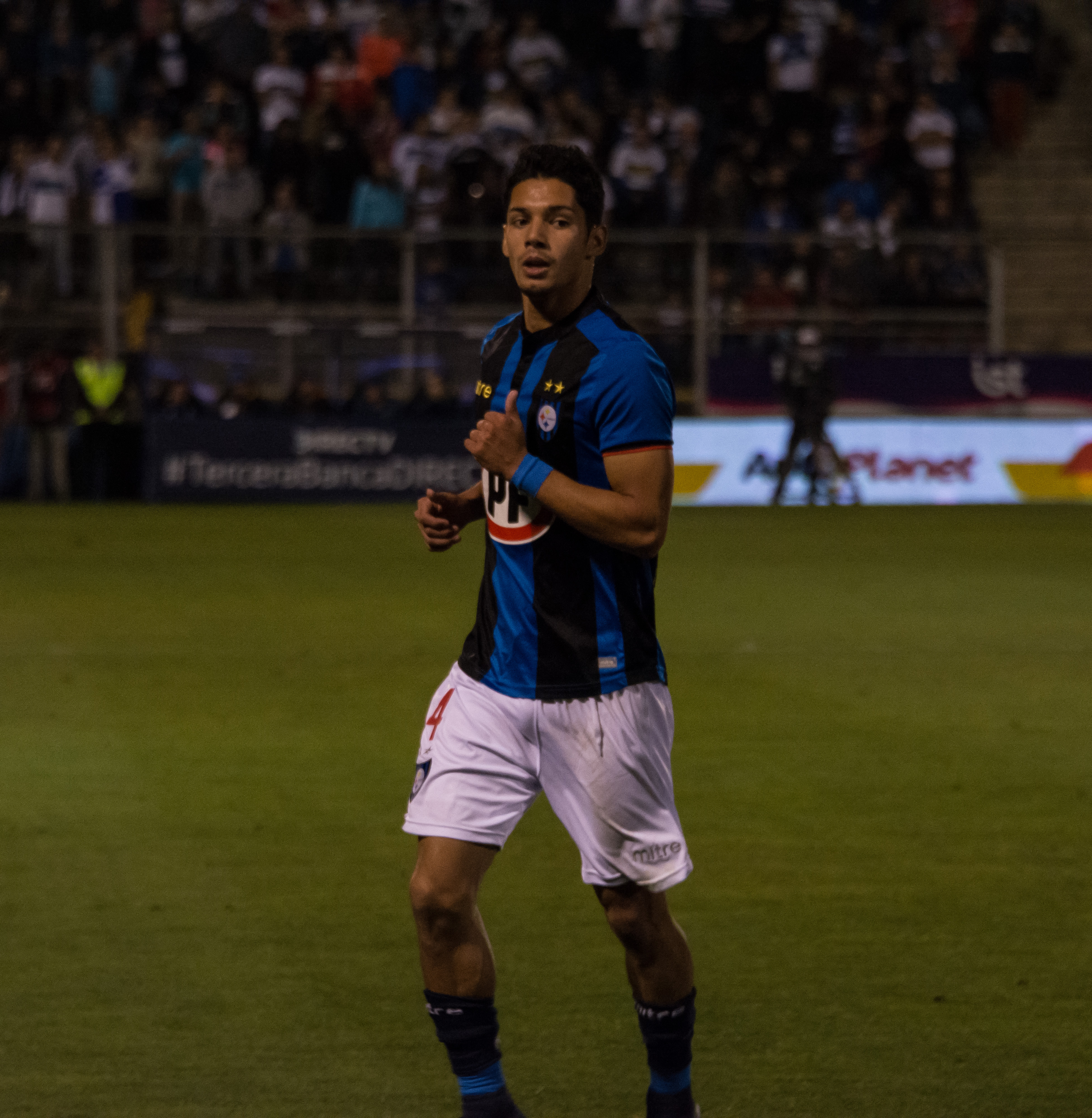
- Martínez with Huachipato in 2018

Personal information
- Full name: Jimmy Antonio Martínez Ruiz
- Date of birth: 26 January 1997 (age 29)
- Place of birth: Laja, Chile
- Height: 1.80 m (5 ft 11 in)
- Position: Midfielder

Team information
- Current team: Universidad Católica

Youth career
- 2000–2012: Huachipato

Senior career*
Years	Team	Apps	(Gls)
2014–2018	Huachipato	58	(2)
2014	→ Naval (loan)	4	(0)
2019–2021	Universidad de Chile	35	(1)
2021	→ Deportes La Serena (loan)	27	(4)
2022–2025	Huachipato	95	(3)
2026–	Universidad Católica	0	(0)

International career^{‡}
2015	Chile U20		
2018–	Chile	4	(0)
- * Club domestic league appearances and goals as of 11 December 2025 ‡ National team caps and goals as of 31 March 2020

Jimmy Antonio Martínez Ruiz (born 26 January 1997) is a Chilean footballer that currently plays as a midfielder for Universidad Católica.

== Club career ==
In 2021, Martínez played for Deportes La Serena on loan from Universidad de Chile.

On 18 December 2025, Martínez signed with Universidad Católica.

== International career ==
Along with Chile U20, he won the L'Alcúdia Tournament in 2015.

== Honours ==
Huachipato

- Chilean Primera División: 2023
- Copa Chile: 2025

Chile U20

- L'Alcúdia International Football Tournament: 2015

Individual

- Chilean Primera División Best Goal: 2023
