= José Bández =

Venezuelan footballer (born 1999)

Personal information
- Full name: José Daniel Bández Salazar
- Date of birth: 10 October 1999 (age 27)
- Place of birth: Calabozo, Venezuela
- Height: 1.68 m (5 ft 6 in)
- Position: Winger

Team information
- Current team: Deportes Antofagasta
- Number: 7

Senior career*
Years	Team	Apps	(Gls)
2016–2018	Carabobo	76	(8)
2019–	Deportes Antofagasta	13	(2)
2020	→ Rangers (loan)	3	(0)
2020	→ Barnechea (loan)	3	(0)
2021–2022	→ Deportes Copiapó (loan)	42	(5)
2023	→ Deportes Antofagasta (loan)	15	(1)
2023	→ Deportes Puerto Montt (loan)	13	(3)
- * Club domestic league appearances and goals as of 12 April 2024

José Daniel Bández Salazar (born 10 October 1999) is a Venezuelan footballer who plays for Deportes Antofagasta.
