= Jhojan Valencia =

Colombian footballer (born 1996)

Personal information
- Full name: Jhojan Manuel Valencia Jiménez
- Date of birth: 27 July 1996 (age 30)
- Place of birth: Cali, Colombia
- Height: 1.72 m (5 ft 8 in)
- Position: Midfielder

Team information
- Current team: Universidad Católica
- Number: 20

Youth career
- –2015: Deportivo Cali

Senior career*
Years	Team	Apps	(Gls)
2015–2021	Deportivo Cali	65	(1)
2017	→ Cúcuta Deportivo (loan)	6	(0)
2018–2019	→ Unión Magdalena (loan)	69	(2)
2022–2024	Austin FC	67	(0)
2025–	Universidad Católica	0	(0)
- * Club domestic league appearances and goals as of 20 December 2024

Jhojan Manuel Valencia Jiménez (born 27 July 1996) is a Colombian football player who plays as midfielder for Universidad Católica in the Chilean Primera División.

== Career ==
Valencia was part of the Deportivo Cali from 2015 to 2021, also spending a six-month stint on loan with Cúcuta Deportivo and two seasons with Unión Magdalena in 2018 and 2019. In 2021, Valencia helped Deportivo Cali become the 2021 Categoría Primera A season Finalización champions.

In January 2022, Valencia transferred to Austin FC. He made his Austin FC debut on 26 February 2022 against FC Cincinnati.

Following Austin FC, Valencia moved to Chile and joined Universidad Católica for the 2025 season.

== International career ==
In February 2021, Valencia was called up to the Colombian national team by Reinaldo Rueda, but he did not make his debut.

== Personal life ==
His father, Manuel, is a former Colombia international footballer.

== Career statistics ==
=== Club ===
As of As of match played 21 June 2026

Appearances and goals by club, season and competition
Club	Season	Division	League		National cup (Note: Appearance(s) in Copa Colombia, U.S. Open Cup and Copa Chile)		League cup (Note: Includes Copa de la Liga)		Continental (Note: Appearance(s) in Copa Sudamericana and CONCACAF Champions League)		Other		Total	
Club	Season	Division	Apps	Goals	Apps	Goals	Apps	Goals	Apps	Goals	Apps	Goals	Apps	Goals
Deportivo Cali	2015	Categoría Primera A	9	0	5	1	—		—		—		14	1
Deportivo Cali	2017	Categoría Primera A	0	0	1	0	—		—		—		1	0
Deportivo Cali	2020	Categoría Primera A	13	0	1	0	—		4	0	—		18	0
Deportivo Cali	2021	Categoría Primera A	43	1	5	0	—		2	0	—		50	1
Deportivo Cali	Club Total		65	1	12	1	—		6	0	—		82	2
Cúcuta Deportivo (loan)	2017	Categoría Primera B	6	0	4	0	—		—		—		10	0
Unión Magdalena (loan)	2018	Categoría Primera B	31	1	1	0	—		—		—		32	1
Unión Magdalena (loan)	2019	Categoría Primera A	38	2	1	0	—		—		—		39	2
Unión Magdalena (loan)	Club Total		75	3	2	0	—		—		—		71	3
Austin FC	2022	Major League Soccer	13	0	1	0	—		—		1 (Note: Appearance in MLS Cup playoffs)	0	15	0
Austin FC	2023	Major League Soccer	27	0	2	0	—		1	0	1 (Note: Appearance(s) in Leagues Cup)	0	31	0
Austin FC	2024	Major League Soccer	27	0	—		—		—		3	0	30	0
Austin FC	Club Total		67	0	3	0	—		1	0	5	0	76	0
Universidad Católica	2025	Primera División	28	0	6	0	—		1 (Note: Appearance in Copa Sudamericana)	0	—		35	0
Universidad Católica	2026	Primera División	13	0	1	0	4	0	6 (Note: Appearance in Copa Libertadores)	0	2 (Note: Appearance(s) in the Supercopa de Chile)	0	26	0
Universidad Católica	Club Total		41	0	7	0	4	0	7	0	2	0	61	0
Career total			249	4	28	1	4	0	18	0	8	0	301	5

== Honours ==
Deportivo Cali

- 2015 Apertura
- 2021 Finalización
