= Nicolás Montiel =

Argentine footballer

Personal information
- Full name: Nicolás Montiel Martínez
- Date of birth: 28 February 2005 (age 21)
- Place of birth: América, Buenos Aires, Argentina
- Height: 1.91 m (6 ft 3 in)
- Position: Striker

Team information
- Current team: Everton (on loan from Ferro Carril Oeste)
- Number: 40

Youth career
- Atlético Rivadavia
- Barrio Norte
- 2022–2024: Ferro Carril Oeste

Senior career*
| Years | Team | Apps | (Gls) |
| 2022 | Barrio Norte | – | (–) |
| 2024– | Ferro Carril Oeste | 18 | (1) |
| 2026– | → Everton (loan) | 1 | (0) |
- * Club domestic league appearances and goals as of 16 March 2026

Nicolás Montiel Martínez (born 28 February 2005) is an Argentine footballer who plays as a striker for Chilean Primera División club Everton on loan from Ferro Carril Oeste.

== Club career ==
Born in América, Buenos Aires Province, Argentina, Montiel was with Atlético Rivadavia and Barrio Norte before joining the Ferro Carril Oeste youth ranks in 2022, aged 17. He made his senior debut with Barrio Norte in the Liga de Fútbol del Oeste. Once he was promoted to the Ferro Carril Oeste first team, he made his debut in the 3–1 away loss against Nueva Chicago on 21 May 2024 for the Primera Nacional and signed his first professional contract on 19 December of the same year. The next year, he scored his first goal in the 2–2 against Racing de Córdoba on 1 September.

In February 2026, Montiel renewed with Ferro Carril Oeste until December 2028 and moved abroad to join Chilean Primera División club Everton de Viña del Mar on loan with purchase option.

== Personal life ==
He is the twin brother of the goalkeeper Federico Montiel.
