= Javier Correa =

Javier Correa may refer to:

- Javier Correa (canoeist) (born 1976), Argentine sprint canoeist
- Javier Correa (footballer) (born 1992), Argentine footballer
