= Bastián Tapia =

Chilean footballer (born 2002)

Personal information
- Full name: Bastián Ignacio Tapia Sepúlveda
- Date of birth: 9 August 2002 (age 24)
- Place of birth: Antofagasta, Chile
- Height: 1.84 m (6 ft 0 in)
- Position: Centre-back

Team information
- Current team: Deportes Antofagasta (on loan from Universidad de Chile)

Youth career
- 2017–2020: Universidad de Chile

Senior career*
| Years | Team | Apps | (Gls) |
| 2020– | Universidad de Chile | 19 | (2) |
| 2021 | → Deportes Iquique (loan) | 12 | (0) |
| 2023 | → Audax Italiano (loan) | 4 | (0) |
| 2023–2025 | → Cobreloa (loan) | 53 | (3) |
| 2026– | → Deportes Antofagasta (loan) | 0 | (0) |

International career^{‡}
| 2020 | Chile U20 | 3 | (1) |
- * Club domestic league appearances and goals as of 19 December 2025 ‡ National team caps and goals as of 19 May 2022

Bastián Ignacio Tapia Sepúlveda (born 9 August 2002) is a Chilean professional footballer who plays as a centre-back for Deportes Antofagasta on loan from Universidad de Chile.

== Club career ==
Tapia joined Universidad de Chile youth system in 2017 and made his professional debut playing for Deportes Iquique in the Primera B de Chile while he was on loan in the 2021 season. Once he returned to Universidad de Chile, he took part in the 2022 Summer International Tournament played in Argentina, making appearances in the matches against Colo-Colo and Boca Juniors.

After playing on loan for Audax Italiano in the first half of 2023, Tapia was loaned to Cobreloa in the second level, renewing his contract for the 2024 season in the top division. He renewed again with Cobreloa for the 2025 season. In 2026, he switched to Deportes Antofagasta.

== International career ==
He represented Chile U20 in a friendly tournament played in Teresópolis, Brazil, called Granja Comary International Tournament, playing all the matches and scoring a goal against Peru U20, Bolivia U20, and Brazil U20.

== Honours ==
Cobreloa

- Primera B de Chile: 2023
