= Justo Giani =

Argentine footballer

Personal information
- Date of birth: 7 April 1999 (age 27)
- Place of birth: Quilmes, Argentina
- Height: 1.80 m (5 ft 11 in)
- Position: Right winger

Team information
- Current team: Universidad Católica
- Number: 7

Youth career
- Escuela Ñato
- Quilmes

Senior career*
Years	Team	Apps	(Gls)
2017–2021	Quilmes	32	(4)
2021–2023	Newell's Old Boys	36	(1)
2022–	→ Patronato (loan)	20	(1)
2023–2025	Atlético Tucumán	38	(1)
2025	Aldosivi	28	(5)
2026–	Universidad Católica	8	(5)
- * Club domestic league appearances and goals as of 2 February 2026

Justo Giani (born 7 April 1999) is an Argentine professional footballer who plays as a right winger for Chilean club Universidad Católica.

== Career ==
Giani began his career with Escuela Ñato, before signing with the youth of Quilmes. He made the move into senior football during the 2017–18 Primera B Nacional campaign, initially appearing in fixtures against Sarmiento, Villa Dálmine and Deportivo Riestra as an unused substitute. Giani made his professional debut against Nueva Chicago in November 2017, with manager Lucas Nardi selecting him to start a 1–1 draw. His first goal arrived on 9 December 2018 versus Instituto. He remained for the next two seasons, appearing twenty-two further times whilst netting goals against Tigre, Atlético de Rafaela and Gimnasia y Esgrima.

On 7 July 2022, Giani joined Patronato on loan until the end of the year.

On 22 February 2021, Giani completed a transfer to Primera División side Newell's Old Boys. He was sent off on his debut during a Copa de la Liga Profesional match away to Talleres, with referee Facundo Tello giving him a straight red card after seventy-seven minutes; he had only been substituted on twenty minutes prior.

On 19 December 2025, Giani signed with Chilean club Universidad Católica for the 2026 season.

== Personal life ==
Born and raised in Argentina, Giani is of Italian descent.

== Career statistics ==
As of As of match played 21 June 2026.

Appearances and goals by club, season and competition
Club	Season	League			Cup (Note: Includes Copa Argentina and Copa Chile)		League Cup (Note: Includes Copa de la Liga Profesional and Copa de la Liga)		Continental		Other		Total	
Club	Season	Division	Apps	Goals	Apps	Goals	Apps	Goals	Apps	Goals	Apps	Goals	Apps	Goals
Quilmes	2017–18	Primera Nacional	4	0	0	0	—		—		—		4	0
Quilmes	2018–19	Primera Nacional	9	1	0	0	—		—		—		9	1
Quilmes	2019–20	Primera Nacional	10	2	0	0	—		—		—		10	2
Quilmes	2020	Primera Nacional	9	1	0	0	—		—		—		9	1
Quilmes	Total		32	4	0	0	—		—		—		32	4
Newell's Old Boys	2021	Primera División	18	1	—		5	0	5 (Note: Appearance in Copa Sudamericana)	1	—		28	2
Newell's Old Boys	2022	Primera División	0	0	—		8	0	—		—		8	0
Newell's Old Boys	2023	Primera División	4	0	1	0	—		2	0	—		7	0
Newell's Old Boys	Total		22	1	—		13	0	7	1	—		43	2
Patronato (loan)	2022	Primera División	20	1	—		4	0	—		—		24	1
Atlético Tucumán	2023	Primera División	—		—		12	0	—		—		12	0
Atlético Tucumán	2024	Primera División	13	0	—		15	1	—		—		28	1
Atlético Tucumán	Total		13	0	—		27	1	—		—		40	1
Aldosivi	2025	Primera División	29	5	3	1	—		—		—		32	6
Universidad Católica	2026	Primera División	15	8	1	0	5	4	6 (Note: Appearance(s) in the Copa Libertadores)	1	2 (Note: Appearance(s) in the Supercopa de Chile)	1	29	14
Career total			131	19	5	1	49	5	13	2	2	1	200	28
