= Darío Melo =

Chilean footballer (born 1993)

Personal information
- Full name: Darío Esteban Melo Pulgar
- Date of birth: 24 March 1993 (age 33)
- Place of birth: Santiago, Chile
- Height: 1.78 m (5 ft 10 in)
- Position: Goalkeeper

Team information
- Current team: Universidad Católica
- Number: 27

Youth career
- 2007–2013: Palestino

Senior career*
| Years | Team | Apps | (Gls) |
| 2012–2018 | Palestino | 75 | (0) |
| 2014 | → Deportes Temuco (loan) | 6 | (0) |
| 2019–2020 | Colo-Colo | 0 | (0) |
| 2021 | Deportes Concepción | 11 | (0) |
| 2022 | Unión San Felipe | 25 | (0) |
| 2023–2025 | Deportes Melipilla | 51 | (0) |
| 2025– | Universidad Católica | 0 | (0) |

International career^{‡}
| 2013 | Chile U20 | 13 | (0) |
- * Club domestic league appearances and goals as of 8 March 2025 ‡ National team caps and goals as of 15 January 2017

Darío Esteban Melo Pulgar (Spanish pronunciation: [daˈɾi.o ˈmelo], born 24 March 1993) is a Chilean footballer who plays for Chilean Primera División side Universidad Católica as a goalkeeper.

== Career ==
In 2021, Melo joined Deportes Concepción.

In January 2023, Melo joined Deportes Melipilla. He switched to Universidad Católica in March 2025 as a free agent.

== Honours ==
Palestino

- Copa Chile: 2018

Colo-Colo

- Copa Chile: 2019

Chile

- China Cup: 2017
