= David Retamal =

Chilean footballer

Personal information
- Full name: David Matías Retamal Bascur
- Date of birth: 14 April 2003 (age 23)
- Place of birth: Santiago, Chile
- Height: 1.80 m (5 ft 11 in)
- Position: Defender

Team information
- Current team: Universidad de Concepción (on loan from Universidad de Chile)
- Number: 5

Youth career
- Universidad de Chile

Senior career*
Years	Team	Apps	(Gls)
2023–	Universidad de Chile	7	(0)
2025	→ Universidad de Concepción (loan)	10	(0)
2026–	→ Universidad de Concepción (loan)	0	(0)
- * Club domestic league appearances and goals as of 28 January 2026

David Matías Retamal Bascur (born 14 April 2003) is a Chilean footballer who plays as a defender for Chilean Primera División club Universidad de Concepción on loan from Universidad de Chile.

== Club career ==
Born in Santiago de Chile, Retamal is a product of Universidad de Chile. Despite he was on the substitutes bench in some matches for the first team during 2023, he was officially promoted under Gustavo Álvarez in 2024. He made his professional debut in the 0–1 away win against Unión Española on 7 April 2024 for the Chilean Primera División. In August of the same year, he suffered a serious meniscus tear.

In March 2025, Retamal was loaned out to Universidad de Concepción and returned to Universidad de Chile for the second half of the year, taking part in the 2025 Copa Sudamericana.

Once Universidad de Concepción won the 2025 Liga de Ascenso and returned to the Chilean top division, Retamal rejoined them on loan for the 2026 season.

== Honours ==
Universidad de Concepción

- Primera B de Chile: 2025
