= Juan Ignacio Díaz =

Argentine footballer

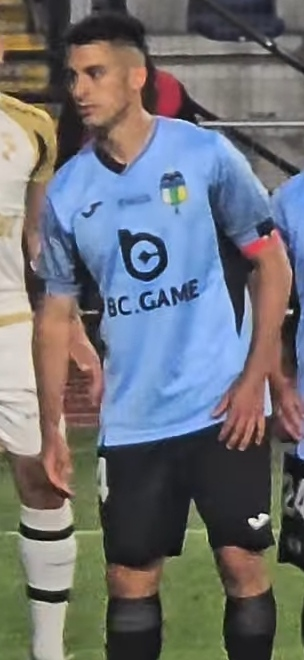
- Díaz with O'Higgins in 2025.

Personal information
- Full name: Juan Ignacio Díaz
- Date of birth: 26 May 1998 (age 28)
- Place of birth: La Plata, Argentina
- Height: 1.82 m (6 ft 0 in)
- Position: Full-back

Team information
- Current team: Universidad Católica

Youth career
- 2007–2019: Estudiantes

Senior career*
Years	Team	Apps	(Gls)
2019–2023	Estudiantes	4	(0)
2020–2021	→ Agropecuario (loan)	23	(1)
2022–2023	→ Barracas Central (loan)	56	(2)
2024–2025	O'Higgins	42	(2)
2026–	Universidad Católica	0	(0)
- * Club domestic league appearances and goals as of 9 January 2026

Juan Ignacio Díaz (born 26 May 1998) is an Argentine professional footballer who plays as a full-back for Chilean Primera División club Universidad Católica.

== Career ==
Díaz began with Estudiantes, joining their academy in 2007. Having sat on the bench for the entirety of a 3–0 loss in Primera División away to San Martín on 4 February 2019, Díaz was selected by Leandro Benítez for his professional bow days later in a fixture with Patronato at the Estadio Ciudad de La Plata. He appeared three more times in 2018–19. In August 2020, after not featuring in 2019–20, Díaz was loaned to Primera B Nacional with Agropecuario.

In January 2022, Díaz joined Barracas Central on a one-year loan.

=== O'Higgins ===
In 2024, Díaz moved to Chile and joined O'Higgins in the Liga de Primera.

He was captain of the club during the 2025 season alongside Alan Robledo, achieving the qualification for the 2026 Copa Libertadores in the victory against Everton on the last week of the championship.

=== Universidad Católica ===
In January 2026, he switched to Universidad Católica.

== Career statistics ==
As of 22 September 2020.

Club statistics
Club	Season	League			Cup		League Cup		Continental		Other		Total	
Club	Season	Division	Apps	Goals	Apps	Goals	Apps	Goals	Apps	Goals	Apps	Goals	Apps	Goals
Estudiantes	2018–19	Primera División	4	0	0	0	0	0	—		0	0	4	0
Estudiantes	2019–20	Primera División	0	0	0	0	0	0	—		0	0	0	0
Estudiantes	2020–21	Primera División	0	0	0	0	0	0	—		0	0	0	0
Estudiantes	Total		4	0	0	0	0	0	—		0	0	4	0
Agropecuario (loan)	2020–21	Primera B Nacional	0	0	0	0	—		—		0	0	0	0
Career total			4	0	0	0	0	0	—		0	0	4	0
