= Danilo Catalán =

Chilean footballer

Personal information
- Full name: Danilo Gonzalo Catalán Córdova
- Date of birth: 19 November 1997 (age 28)
- Place of birth: Maipú, Santiago, Chile
- Height: 1.71 m (5 ft 7 in)
- Position: Midfielder

Team information
- Current team: San Luis

Youth career
- 2007–2016: Universidad de Chile

Senior career*
Years	Team	Apps	(Gls)
2017	Universidad de Chile	0	(0)
2017	→ Deportes Valdivia (loan)	7	(0)
2018	Deportes Recoleta	22	(0)
2019–2021	Deportes La Serena	16	(0)
2021–2022	Santiago Morning	55	(1)
2023	Deportes Santa Cruz	23	(0)
2024	Magallanes	29	(1)
2025–2026	Deportes Limache	15	(0)
2026–	San Luis	0	(0)

International career
2015	Chile U20	6	(0)
- * Club domestic league appearances and goals as of 12 March 2026

Danilo Gonzalo Catalán Córdova (born 19 November 2017) is a Chilean footballer who plays as a midfielder for San Luis de Quillota.

== Club career ==
A product of Universidad de Chile, Catalán became the team captain of the under-19's, winning the national championship. He was promoted to the first team by Ángel Guillermo Hoyos in January 2017 and sent on loan to Deportes Valdivia in June of the same year.

The next years, Catalán played for Deportes Recoleta, Deportes La Serena, Santiago Morning, Deportes Santa Cruz and Magallanes. With Deportes La Serena, he got the promotion and played in the 2020 Chilean Primera División.

In January 2025, Catalán joined Deportes Limache in the Chilean Primera División. In March 2026, he switched to San Luis de Quillota.

== International career ==
Catalán represented Chile at under-20 level in the 2015 L'Alcúdia International Tournament, becoming the champions.
