= Martín Gómez (footballer, born 2006) =

Argentine footballer

Personal information
- Full name: Martín Alejandro Gómez
- Date of birth: 1 May 2006 (age 20)
- Place of birth: Los Cardales, Argentina
- Height: 1.76 m (5 ft 9 in)
- Position: Attacking midfielder

Team information
- Current team: Universidad Católica (on loan from Real Pilar)
- Number: 22

Youth career
- Vélez Sarsfield
- Real Pilar

Senior career*
Years	Team	Apps	(Gls)
2024–	Real Pilar	67	(2)
2026–	→ Universidad Católica (loan)	11	(0)
- * Club domestic league appearances and goals as of 14 August 2026

Martín Alejandro Gómez (born 1 May 2006) is an Argentine footballer who plays as an attacking midfielder for Chilean Primera División club Universidad Católica on loan from Real Pilar.

== Career ==
Born in Los Cardales, Argentina, Gómez was trained at Real Pilar, with a brief stint at Vélez Sarsfield. He was promoted to the first team in 2024 and helped them to win the 2024 Primera C Metropolitana. The next year, they extended his contract until the 2028 season.

In January 2026, Gómez was sent on loan to Chilean club Universidad Católica on a deal for a year with a purchase option. He made his debut in the 1–0 away loss against O'Higgins in the Liga de Primera on 7 March 2026.

== Personal life ==
He is nicknamed Pesadilla (Nightmare).
