= Bastián Yáñez =

Chilean footballer (born 2001)

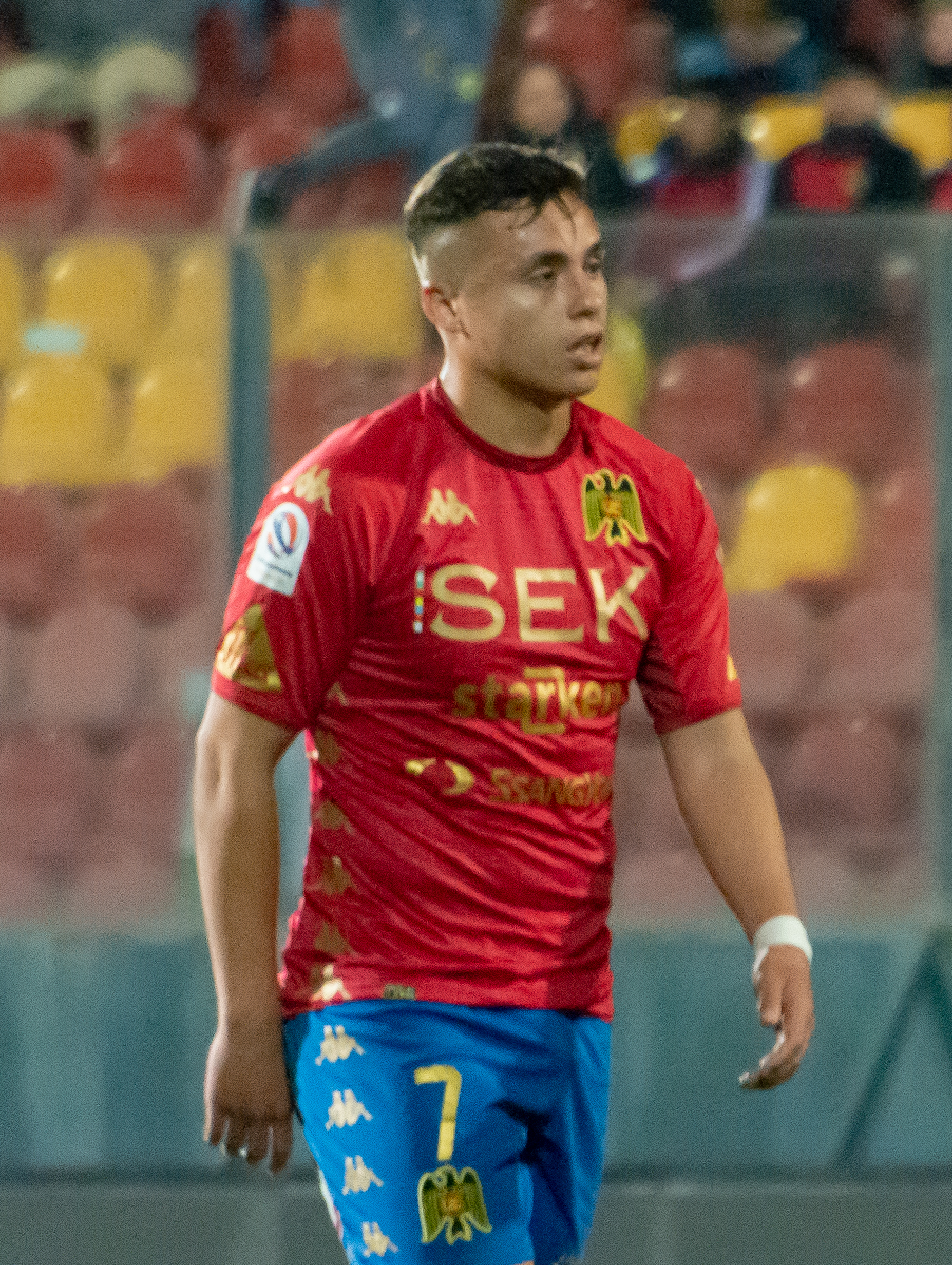
- Yáñez with Unión Española in 2023

Personal information
- Full name: Bastián Jean Yáñez Miranda
- Date of birth: 21 June 2001 (age 25)
- Place of birth: Santiago, Chile
- Height: 1.73 m (5 ft 8 in)
- Position: Left winger

Team information
- Current team: O'Higgins
- Number: 29

Youth career
- 2009–2019: Unión Española

Senior career*
Years	Team	Apps	(Gls)
2018–2025	Unión Española	116	(5)
2025	Godoy Cruz	20	(0)
2026–	O'Higgins	16	(1)

International career^{‡}
2021–	Chile	2	(0)
2022	Chile U23	1	(0)
- * Club domestic league appearances and goals as of 17:13, 15 August 2026 (UTC) ‡ National team caps and goals as of 7 October 2022

Bastián Jean Yáñez Miranda (born 21 June 2001) is a Chilean professional footballer who plays as a left winger for O'Higgins.

== Club career ==
Yáñez came to Unión Española at the age of 8 and became champion of the Campeonato Nacional Sub 17 (National under-17 Championship) in 2018. In the same year, he made his professional debut in a Chilean Primera División match against O'Higgins. He ended his contract at the end of 2024.

In 2025, Yáñez moved abroad and signed with Argentine club Godoy Cruz. The next year, he returned to Chile and signed a two-year contract with O'Higgins.

== International career ==
In September 2021, Yáñez was called up to the Chile national team for the 2022 FIFA World Cup qualifiers, but he was withdrawn from the squad due to an injury.

Yáñez made his debut for the Chile national team on 9 December 2021 in a 2–2 draw against Mexico.

He represented Chile at under-23 level in a 1–0 win against Peru U23 on 31 August 2022, in the context of preparations for the 2023 Pan American Games.

== Honours ==
Unión Española U17

- Campeonato Nacional Sub-17 (1): 2018
