= Bryan González (Chilean footballer) =

Chilean footballer (born 2003)

Personal information
- Full name: Bryan David González Guzmán
- Date of birth: 23 February 2003 (age 23)
- Place of birth: Santiago, Chile
- Height: 1.65 m (5 ft 5 in)
- Position: Midfielder

Team information
- Current team: Unión San Felipe (on loan from Universidad Católica)

Youth career
- Universidad Católica

Senior career*
Years	Team	Apps	(Gls)
2022–	Universidad Católica	17	(0)
2025	→ Unión San Felipe (loan)	27	(1)
2026–	→ Unión San Felipe (loan)	0	(0)

International career^{‡}
2022–2023	Chile U20	3	(0)
- * Club domestic league appearances and goals as of 24 June 2026 ‡ National team caps and goals as of 20 February 2023

Bryan David González Guzmán (born 23 February 2003) is a Chilean professional footballer who plays as a midfielder for Unión San Felipe on loan from Universidad Católica.

== Club career ==
González made his professional debut playing for Universidad Catolica in a 2021 Copa Chile match against Unión San Felipe on 19 June 2022. In 2025, he was loaned out to Unión San Felipe. Back to Universidad Católica in 2026, he returned to Unión San Felipe for the second half of the year.

== International career ==
In the 2022 South American Games, he made 3 appearances for Chile U20. In 2023, he took part of the Chile squad in the South American U-20 Championship, but he made no appearances.

== Career statistics ==
=== Club ===
As of 27 August 2022

Club	Season	League			National Cup		Continental		Other		Total	
Club	Season	Division	Apps	Goals	Apps	Goals	Apps	Goals	Apps	Goals	Apps	Goals
Universidad Católica	2022	C. Primera División	3	0	4	0	0	0	0	0	7	0
Universidad Católica	Total club		3	0	4	0	0	0	0	0	7	0
Universidad Católica	Career Total		3	0	4	0	0	0	0	0	7	0
