= Norman Rodríguez =

Uruguayan footballer

Personal information
- Full name: Norman Exzequiel Rodríguez Olivera
- Date of birth: 12 July 1998 (age 28)
- Place of birth: Montevideo, Uruguay
- Height: 1.84 m (6 ft 0 in)
- Position: Centre-back

Team information
- Current team: Deportes Concepción (on loan from Carabobo)
- Number: 21

Youth career
- Racing Montevideo

Senior career*
Years	Team	Apps	(Gls)
2018–2022	Racing Montevideo	23	(0)
2022	→ Uruguay Montevideo (loan)	25	(0)
2023	Rampla Juniors	29	(2)
2024	River Plate Montevideo	22	(2)
2025–	Carabobo	31	(1)
2026–	→ Deportes Concepción (loan)	5	(0)
- * Club domestic league appearances and goals as of 29 December 2025

Norman Exzequiel Rodríguez Olivera (born 12 July 1998) is a Uruguayan professional footballer who plays as a centre-back for Chilean club Deportes Concepción on loan from Venezuelan club Carabobo.

== Career ==
A product of Racing Club de Montevideo, Rodríguez made his professional in the 2019 Torneo Intermedio. He was loaned out to Uruguay Montevideo in 2022.

The next seasons, Rodríguez played for Rampla Juniors and River Plate Montevideo in 2023 and 2024.

In 2025, Rodríguez moved abroad and signed with Venezuelan club Carabobo, taking part in the 2025 Copa Libertadores. In December 2025, he was loaned out to Chilean Primera División club Deportes Concepción for the 2026 season.
