= Rodrigo Cáseres =

Argentine footballer

Personal information
- Full name: Rodrigo Cáseres
- Date of birth: 29 August 1997 (age 29)
- Place of birth: Laboulaye, Córdoba, Argentina
- Height: 1.93 m (6 ft 4 in)
- Position: Centre-back

Team information
- Current team: Unión La Calera
- Number: 6

Youth career
- 2011–2018: Vélez Sarsfield

Senior career*
Years	Team	Apps	(Gls)
2018–2021	Vélez Sarsfield	0	(0)
2019–2021	→ JJ Urquiza (loan)	29	(2)
2021	→ Villa Dálmine (loan)	34	(1)
2022–2023	Gimnasia de Mendoza	12	(0)
2024–2025	San Martín SJ	63	(1)
2026–	Unión La Calera	1	(1)
- * Club domestic league appearances and goals as of 3 February 2026

Rodrigo Cáseres (born 29 August 1997) is an Argentine footballer who plays as a centre-back for Chilean club Unión La Calera.

== Club career ==
Born in Laboulaye, Argentina, Cáseres joined the Vélez Sarsfield youth ranks at the age of 14. He was loaned out to JJ Urquiza and Villa Dálmine in 2019 and 2021, respectively.

In February 2022, Cáseres joined Gimnasia y Esgrima de Mendoza in the Primera B Nacional. In 2024, he moved to San Martín de San Juan, where he helped the side earn promotion to the 2025 Argentine Primera División.

In January 2026, Cáseres moved abroad and signed with Unión La Calera in the Chilean Primera División.
