= Christopher Díaz (footballer) =

Chilean footballer (born 1995)

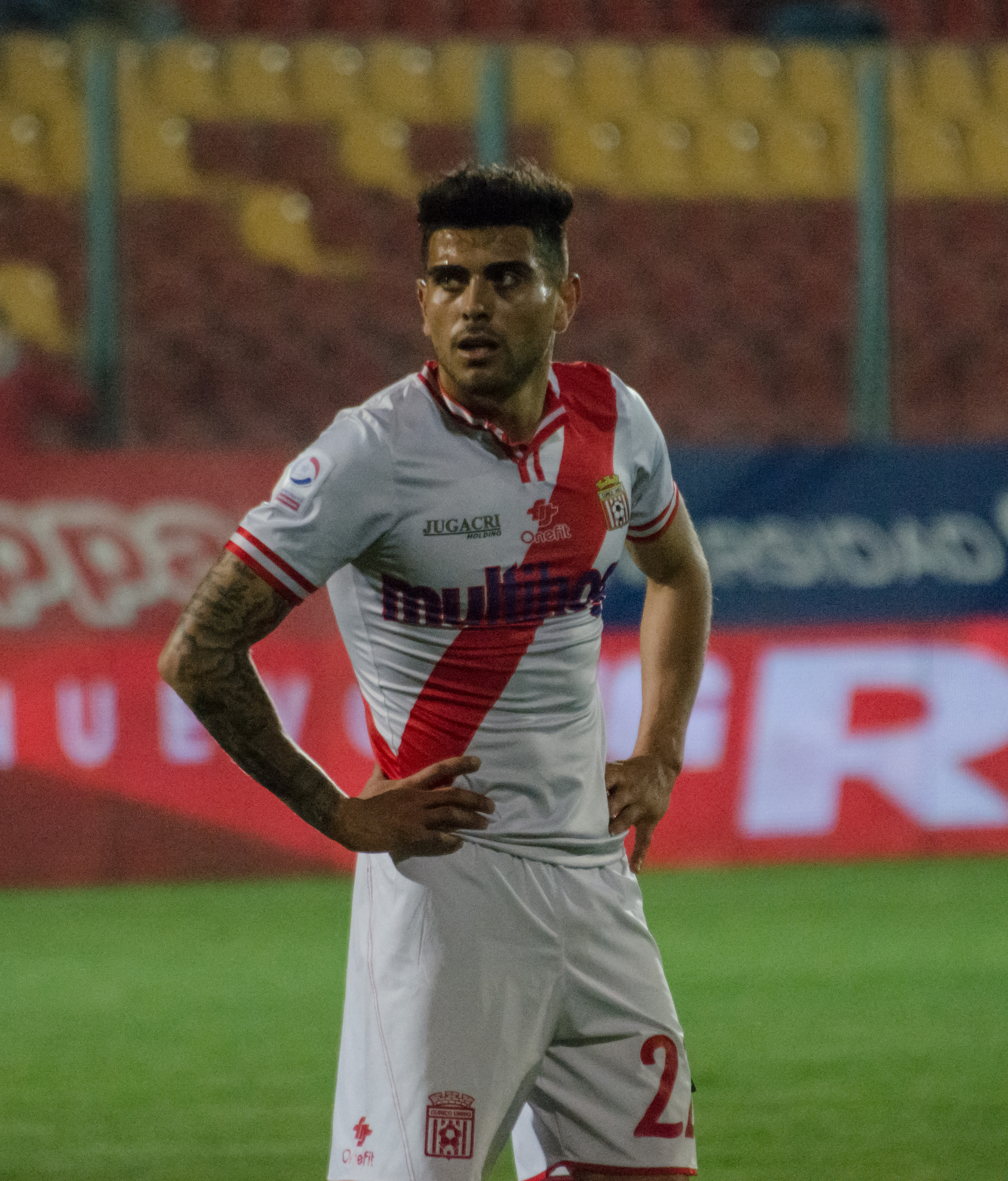
- Díaz with Curicó Unido in 2018

Personal information
- Full name: Christopher Felipe Díaz Peña
- Date of birth: 25 July 1995 (age 31)
- Place of birth: Curicó, Chile
- Height: 1.75 m (5 ft 9 in)
- Position: Right-back

Team information
- Current team: Unión La Calera

Senior career*
Years	Team	Apps	(Gls)
2013–2019	Curicó Unido	83	(2)
2015	→ San Antonio Unido (loan)	1	(0)
2016	→ Whitecaps FC 2 (loan)	9	(0)
2019	→ Cobreloa (loan)	23	(1)
2020–2024	Rangers	143	(18)
2025–	Unión La Calera	0	(0)

International career
2014	Chile U20	3	(1)
- * Club domestic league appearances and goals as of 22 December 2024

Christopher Felipe Díaz Peña (born 25 July 1995) is a Chilean footballer who currently plays as a right-back for Unión La Calera.

== Club career ==
Díaz began his career at his local side Curicó Unido in 2013, before moving to Canada with United Soccer League side Whitecaps FC 2.

On 2 January 2019, Cobreloa announced the signing of Díaz. In 2020, he joined Rangers de Talca.

Díaz spent five seasons with Rangers de Talca from 2020 to 2024. In 2025, he moved to Unión La Calera.

== International career ==
In 2014, he took part of Chile U20 squad in friendly matches against Paraguay U20. In addition, he performed as a sparring for the Chile senior team.

== Honours ==
Curicó Unido

- Primera B de Chile: 2016-17
