= Cristián Cuevas =

Chilean footballer (born 1995)

Cristian Cuevas
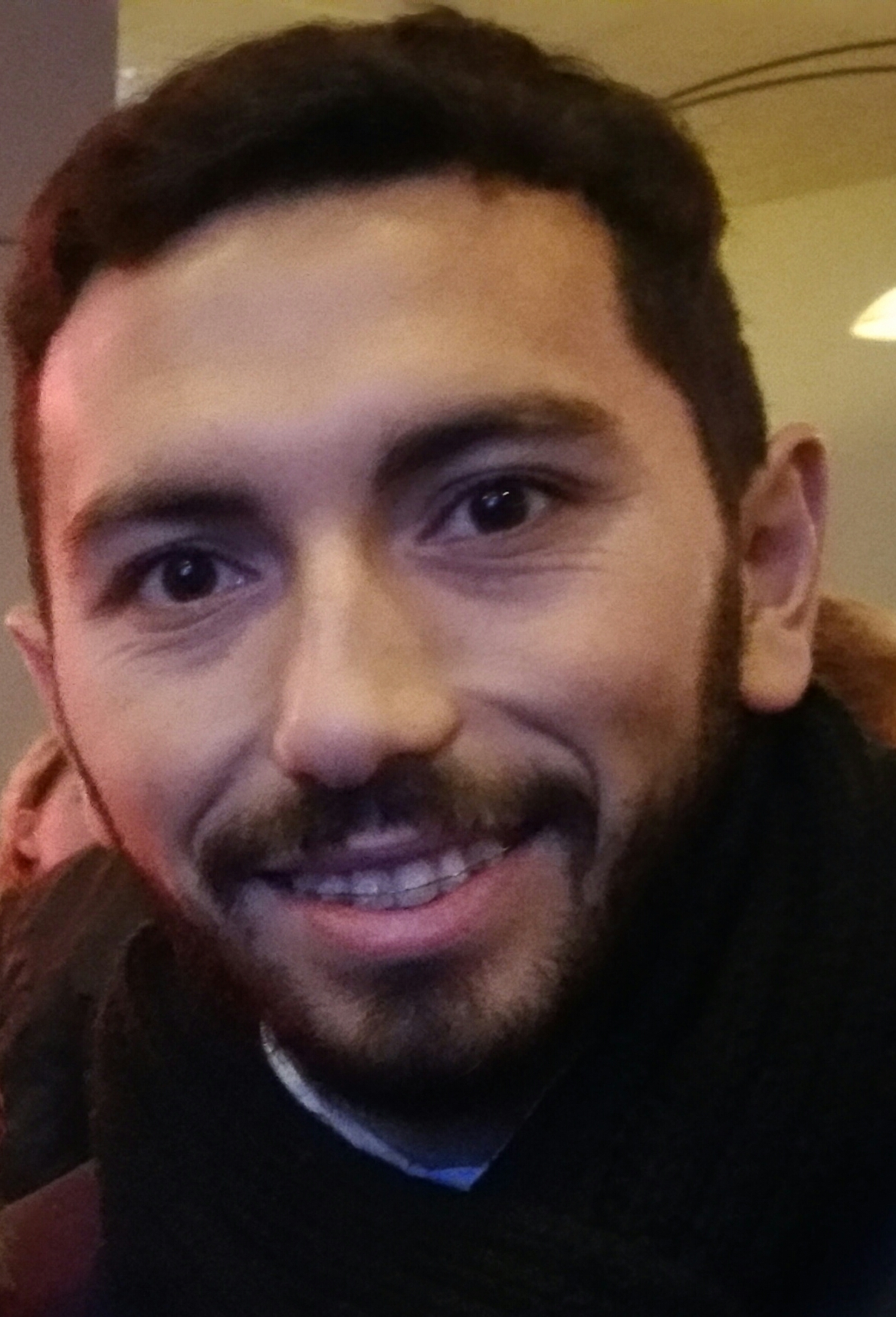
- Cuevas in 2017

Personal information
- Full name: Cristián Alejandro Cuevas Jara
- Date of birth: 2 April 1995 (age 31)
- Place of birth: Rancagua, Chile
- Height: 1.75 m (5 ft 9 in)
- Positions: Left back; left winger

Team information
- Current team: Universidad Católica
- Number: 15

Youth career
- 2007–2012: O'Higgins

Senior career*
| Years | Team | Apps | (Gls) |
| 2011–2013 | O'Higgins | 10 | (0) |
| 2013–2017 | Chelsea | 0 | (0) |
| 2013–2014 | → Vitesse (loan) | 0 | (0) |
| 2014 | → FC Eindhoven (loan) | 13 | (1) |
| 2014–2015 | → Universidad de Chile (loan) | 4 | (0) |
| 2015–2016 | → Sint-Truiden (loan) | 28 | (1) |
| 2016–2017 | → Sint-Truiden (loan) | 18 | (0) |
| 2017–2021 | Huachipato | 54 | (1) |
| 2017–2018 | → Twente (loan) | 24 | (0) |
| 2018–2019 | → Austria Wien (loan) | 18 | (0) |
| 2022– | Universidad Católica | 80 | (3) |

International career^{‡}
| 2013–2015 | Chile U20 | 19 | (4) |
| 2018– | Chile | 2 | (0) |
- * Club domestic league appearances and goals as of 6 July 2025 ‡ National team caps and goals as of 8 February 2025

Cristián Alejandro "Cimbi" Cuevas Jara (Spanish pronunciation: [kɾisˈtjaŋ ˈkweβas]; (Note: In isolation, Cristián is pronounced [kɾisˈtjan].) born 2 April 1995) is a Chilean professional footballer who plays for Universidad Católica. Cuevas plays primarily as a left-back but can also operate as a left-winger.

Cuevas played for the Chile national under-20 team and was selected to play in the South American Youth Championship. He competed in the FIFA U-20 World Cup in Turkey, helping Chile progress to the quarter-finals.

== Club career ==
=== O'Higgins ===
Cuevas began his career at Primera División de Chile club O'Higgins. He progressed from the club's youth level all the way to the senior team. In 2011, he was promoted to the senior team, making his debut on 8 May in a 5–1 away loss to Colo-Colo at the Estadio Monumental. Cuevas has continued to appear since it, particularly in Copa Chile games.

In November 2012, it was reported that Cuevas had held a successful trial with Premier League club Chelsea following a number of impressive performances for the Chilean under-20 team.

In 2013, after a season at the reserve team, he was considered by Eduardo Berizzo to play the Torneo Transición, who chose him after a well South American Youth Football Championship in Argentina with the national under-20 side. He made seven appearances (the most of those as left back) and before the FIFA U-20 World Cup, on 23 July, Cuevas completed a five-year contract with Chelsea which will keep at Stamford Bridge until 2018. The transfer fee paid to O'Higgins was reported as £1.7 million.

=== Chelsea ===
After his successful move, Cuevas joined the club's pre-season and stayed training with the first adult team alongside other youngsters players under the orders of José Mourinho before being sent on season long loan to Dutch Eredivisie club Vitesse. There he linked up with fellow Chelsea loanees Patrick van Aanholt, Gaël Kakuta, Lucas Piazon, Tomáš Kalas, Sam Hutchinson and Christian Atsu.

==== Loan to Vitesse ====
On 1 September 2013, Cuevas made his first appearance on the bench in the match against AZ, although he was an unused substitution as Vitesse drew 1–1. On 1 September 2013, he again made an appearance on the bench in the match against PEC Zwolle, but remained unused.

Cuevas failed to make a single first team appearance before Vitesse decided to cancel his loan in February.

==== Loan to FC Eindhoven ====
On 7 February 2014, it was announced that Cuevas would spend the rest of the season on loan with FC Eindhoven in the Dutch Eerste Divisie. Later that day, he made his debut, coming off the bench and replacing Torino Hunte after the first half in a match against Almere City which ended in a 2–1 loss for Eindhoven. On 28 March, he scored his first goal for the club – and his first professional goal – in a 4–0 win over Sparta Rotterdam.

He finished the season with 13 appearances and one goal.

==== Loan to Universidad de Chile ====
On 30 June 2014, Cuevas was sent on a season long loan to Universidad de Chile. He made his debut on 13 February 2015 against Unión Española, which ended in a 2–1 loss for Universidad de Chile.

Cuevas made a total of six appearances with only four league appearances during his time back in his home country.

==== Loan to Sint-Truiden ====
On 10 August 2015, Cuevas was sent on a season-long loan to Belgian side Sint-Truiden along with fellow Chelsea youth player Joao Rodríguez. On 16 August 2015, he made his debut off the bench in the 62nd minute, replacing Yannis Mbombo in the match against Gent, a 1–0 defeat. On 21 November 2015, he scored his first goal for Sint-Truiden in their 2–1 away defeat against Waasland-Beveren, netting the opener of the fixture in the 9th minute.

On 31 August 2016, Cuevas returned to Sint-Truiden for another season-long loan.

=== Huachipato ===
On 1 July 2017, Cuevas agreed to return to Chile to join Primera División side Huachipato and a month later joined Dutch side Twente on a season-long loan. On 14 April 2018, he became the joint record holder for most yellow cards in a single Eredivisie season after getting his 12th yellow card of the season against ADO Den Haag.

Following a season at Twente, Cuevas joined Austria Wien in July 2018 on a season-long loan, with an option to buy.

=== Universidad Católica ===
On 31 January 2022, Cuevas joined Universidad Católica on a permanent basis.

== International career ==
Cuevas was part of the Chile under-20 team which participated in the 2013 South American Youth Championship in Argentina. He also joined the first team for the 2013 FIFA U-20 World Cup based in Turkey, where they reached the quarter-finals.

In 2014, Cuevas represented the under-20's at the Torneo Cuatro Naciones Chile 2014.

Cuevas was also included in Chile's squad for the 2015 South American Youth Football Championship, held in Uruguay.

== Career statistics ==
=== Club ===
As of As of match played 21 June 2026.

Appearances and goals by club, season and competition
| Club | Season | League | | | Cup (Note: Includes Copa Chile, FA Cup, League Cup, KNVB Cup, Belgian Cup, Austrian Cup) | | League cup (Note: Includes Copa de la Liga) | | Continental | | Other | | Total | |
| Club | Season | Division | Apps | Goals | Apps | Goals | Apps | Goals | Apps | Goals | Apps | Goals | Apps | Goals |
|---|---|---|---|---|---|---|---|---|---|---|---|---|---|---|
| O'Higgins | 2011 | Primera División | 1 | 0 | 3 | 0 | — | | — | | — | | 4 | 0 |
| O'Higgins | 2012 | Primera División | 2 | 0 | — | | — | | — | | — | | 2 | 0 |
| O'Higgins | 2013 | Primera División | 7 | 0 | — | | — | | — | | — | | 7 | 0 |
| O'Higgins | Total | | 10 | 0 | 3 | 0 | — | | — | | — | | 14 | 0 |
| Chelsea | 2013–14 | Premier League | — | | — | | — | | — | | — | | 0 | 0 |
| Vitesse (loan) | 2013–14 | Eredivisie | — | | — | | — | | — | | — | | 0 | 0 |
| FC Eindhoven (loan) | 2013–14 | Eerste Divisie | 13 | 1 | — | | — | | — | | 2 (Note: Appearances in the Eerste Divisie play-offs) | 0 | 15 | 1 |
| Universidad de Chile (loan) | 2014–15 | Primera División | 4 | 0 | 2 | 0 | — | | 0 | 0 | — | | 6 | 0 |
| Sint-Truiden (loan) | 2015–16 | Belgian Pro League | 28 | 1 | 1 | 0 | — | | — | | — | | 29 | 1 |
| Sint-Truiden (loan) | 2016–17 | Belgian First A | 20 (Note: 2 Appearances in the Belgian First Division A Europa League play-offs) | 0 | 1 | 0 | — | | — | | — | | 21 | 0 |
| Sint-Truiden (loan) | Total | | 48 | 1 | 2 | 0 | — | | — | | 2 | 0 | 50 | 1 |
| Twente (loan) | 2017–18 | Eredivisie | 24 | 0 | 4 | 0 | — | | — | | — | | 28 | 0 |
| Austria Wien (loan) | 2018–19 | Austrian Bundesliga | 18 | 0 | 1 | 0 | — | | — | | — | | 19 | 0 |
| Huachipato | 2019 | Primera División | 3 | 0 | — | | — | | — | | — | | 0 | 0 |
| Huachipato | 2020 | Primera División | 28 | 1 | — | | — | | 4 (Note: Appearances in the Copa Sudamericana) | 0 | — | | 32 | 1 |
| Huachipato | 2021 | Primera División | 26 | 0 | 5 | 0 | — | | 8 | 0 | — | | 67 | 0 |
| Huachipato | Total | | 56 | 1 | 5 | 0 | — | | 12 | 0 | — | | 55 | 1 |
| Universidad Católica | 2022 | Primera División | 10 | 0 | 2 | 0 | — | | 7 (Note: 5 appearances in Copa Libertadores, 1 in Copa Sudamericana) | 0 | — | | 19 | 0 |
| Universidad Católica | 2023 | Primera División | 28 | 2 | 5 | 0 | — | | 1 | 0 | — | | 34 | 2 |
| Universidad Católica | 2024 | Primera División | 27 | 1 | 3 | 0 | — | | 1 | 0 | — | | 31 | 1 |
| Universidad Católica | 2025 | Primera División | 23 | 2 | 6 | 0 | — | | 1 | 0 | — | | 30 | 2 |
| Universidad Católica | 2026 | Primera División | 14 | 1 | 1 | 0 | 6 | 0 | 6 (Note: Appearance(s) in the Copa Libertadores) | 0 | 2 (Note: Appearance(s) in the Supercopa de Chile) | 0 | 29 | 0 |
| Universidad Católica | Total | | 96 | 5 | 17 | 0 | 6 | 0 | 16 | 0 | 2 | 0 | 143 | 5 |
| Career total | | | 276 | 9 | 34 | 0 | 6 | 0 | 28 | 0 | 4 | 0 | 348 | 8 |

=== International ===
As of match played 8 February 2025

Appearances and goals by national team and year
| National team | Year | Apps | Goals |
|---|---|---|---|
| Chile | 2018 | 1 | 0 |
| Chile | 2019 | 1 | 0 |
| Total | | 2 | 0 |
