= Bayron Oyarzo =

Chilean footballer

Personal information
- Full name: Bayron Andrés Oyarzo Muñoz
- Date of birth: 14 July 1995 (age 31)
- Place of birth: Puerto Montt, Chile
- Height: 1.67 m (5 ft 6 in)
- Position: Forward

Team information
- Current team: Unión La Calera

Youth career
- Estrella Blanca
- Deportes Puerto Montt
- 2013–2014: Barnechea

Senior career*
Years	Team	Apps	(Gls)
2014–2019	Barnechea	74	(14)
2020–2022	Curicó Unido	65	(9)
2023–2025	Ñublense	63	(7)
2026–	Unión La Calera	0	(0)
- * Club domestic league appearances and goals as of 14 December 2025

Bayron Andrés Oyarzo Muñoz (born 14 July 1995) is a Chilean footballer who plays as a forward for Unión La Calera.

== Club career ==
Born in Puerto Montt, Chile, Oyarzo was trained at Deportes Puerto Montt and joined Barnechea at the age of 17. He made his professional debut in 2014–15 Chilean Primera División. Later, he won the 2016–17 Segunda División Profesional de Chile and continued with them until the 2019 season.

In 2020, Oyarzo switched to Curicó Unido in the Chilean Primera División, spending three seasons with them.

In 2023, Oyarzo continued in the Chilean top division with Ñublense and took part in the 2023 and the 2025 Copa Libertadores and the 2023 Copa Sudamericana, where the club got the first win abroad at international level by defeating LDU Quito by 2–3 on 10 August. In May 2022, he was operated on for an articular cartilage damage. He left Ñublense at the end of 2025.

On 31 December 2025, Oyarzo signed with Unión La Calera.
