= 2022 Copa Chile =

Copa Chile Easy 2022

Tournament details
- Country: Chile
- Dates: 19 March – 13 November 2022
- Teams: 61

Final positions
- Champions: Magallanes (1st title)
- Runners-up: Unión Española
- Copa Libertadores: Magallanes

Tournament statistics
- Matches played: 87
- Goals scored: 247 (2.84 per match)
- Top goal scorer: Fernando Zampedri (6 goals)

The 2022 Copa Chile (officially known as Copa Chile Easy 2022 due to its sponsorship), was the 42nd edition of the Copa Chile, the country's national football cup tournament. The tournament began on 19 March 2022 and ended on 13 November 2022, with the final match on neutral ground.

Magallanes won their first Copa Chile title, defeating Unión Española 7–6 on penalty kicks after a 2–2 draw in the final. Colo-Colo were the defending champions, but were eliminated by Ñublense in the round of 16.

== Format ==
The 2022 Copa Chile is based on a system of direct elimination with double-legged ties, similar to the Copa del Rey. In the first stage, clubs affiliated to ANFA (those from Tercera A, Tercera B and regional amateur leagues) and clubs from the Segunda División Profesional were paired into 14 ties with the winners and the best loser advancing to the second stage, in which those 15 teams were joined by the 17 Primera B clubs. In the third stage, the 16 second stage winners faced the 16 Primera División clubs which entered the competition at that point. The first and second stages, as well as the final, were played as single-legged ties, whilst the remaining rounds (third stage, round of 16, quarter-finals and semi-finals) were played under a double-legged format. VAR was implemented for the semi-finals and final.

== Prizes ==
The champions of this edition were entitled to earn the right to compete in the 2023 Copa Libertadores, taking the Chile 4 berth, and also earned the right to play the 2023 Supercopa de Chile against the 2022 Campeonato Nacional champions.

== Schedule ==
Round	Draw date	First leg	Second leg
First stage	10 March 2022	19–20 March 2022	
Second stage	20 March 2022	26–28 March 2022	
Third stage	10 May 2022	16–19 June 2022	23–27 June 2022
Round of 16	10 May 2022	16–18 August 2022	20–22 August 2022
Quarter-finals	10 May 2022	23–25 September 2022	27 September – 13 October 2022
Semi-finals	10 May 2022	12–26 October 2022	16 October – 2 November 2022
Final	10 May 2022	13 November 2022	

== Teams ==
61 clubs took part in this edition of the Copa Chile: 16 from the Primera División, 17 from the Primera B, 12 from the Segunda División Profesional, 7 from Tercera A, 2 from Tercera B and 7 from regional amateur leagues.

=== Primera A ===
- Audax Italiano
- Cobresal
- Colo-Colo
- Coquimbo Unido
- Curicó Unido
- Deportes Antofagasta
- Deportes La Serena
- Everton
- Huachipato
- Ñublense
- O'Higgins
- Palestino
- Unión Española
- Unión La Calera
- Universidad Católica
- Universidad de Chile

=== Primera B ===
- Barnechea
- Cobreloa
- Deportes Copiapó
- Deportes Iquique
- Deportes Melipilla
- Deportes Puerto Montt
- Deportes Recoleta
- Deportes Santa Cruz
- Deportes Temuco
- Fernández Vial
- Magallanes
- Rangers
- San Luis
- Santiago Morning
- Santiago Wanderers
- Unión San Felipe
- Universidad de Concepción

=== Segunda División ===
- Deportes Concepción
- Deportes Limache
- Deportes Valdivia
- General Velásquez
- Iberia
- Independiente de Cauquenes
- Lautaro de Buin
- Real San Joaquín
- Rodelindo Román
- San Antonio Unido
- San Marcos de Arica
- Trasandino

=== Tercera A ===
- Brujas de Salamanca
- Deportes Quillón
- Deportes Rengo
- Provincial Ovalle
- Provincial Ranco
- Quintero Unido
- Unión Compañías

=== Tercera B ===
- Aguará
- Tricolor Municipal

=== Regional Amateur ===
- Colo-Colito
- Cóndor de Pichidegua
- Dante de Nueva Imperial
- La Higuera
- La Obra
- San Bernardo Unido
- Unión Bellavista

== First stage ==
The pairings for the first stage were announced by the ANFP on 10 March 2022. The 12 Segunda División teams were drawn against 12 teams from ANFA, with the four remaining ANFA sides being drawn against each other according to geographical and safety criteria. Ties in this round were single-legged, with the team from the lower tier hosting the match. Matches in this round were played on 19 and 20 March 2022.

19 March 2022	Quintero Unido (4)	1–4	Deportes Limache (3)	La Calera
12:00 UTC−3	Marchant 48'	Report	Espinoza 20'; Herrera 59'; Díaz 90+1'; Toro 90+2'	Stadium: Municipal Nicolás Chahuán Nazar; Referee: Víctor Abarzúa

19 March 2022	La Obra (6)	1–4	Colo-Colito (6)	Talca
18:00 UTC−3	Jhimmy 19'	Report	Castagnoli 21'; Macaya 44'; Tegue 50'; Mendoza 74'	Stadium: Fiscal; Referee: Juan Comas

19 March 2022	Brujas de Salamanca (4)	0–1	Real San Joaquín (3)	Salamanca
18:00 UTC−3		Report	Campillay 72'	Stadium: Municipal de Salamanca; Referee: Franco Jiménez

19 March 2022	Unión Compañías (4)	1–1 (4–5 p)	Trasandino (3)	La Serena
18:00 UTC−3	Portilla 73'	Report	Orrego 63'	Stadium: La Portada; Referee: Claudio Aranda

19 March 2022	Deportes Rengo (4)	1–3	San Antonio Unido (3)	Rengo
18:00 UTC−3	Recabal 4'	Report	Valdés 14'; Rojas 24'; Matamala 49'	Stadium: Guillermo Guzmán; Referee: Claudio Cevasco

19 March 2022	Dante de Nueva Imperial (6)	0–3; Awarded	Deportes Concepción (3)
Note: Match awarded to Deportes Concepción as Dante de Nueva Imperial did not have a suitable stadium to host the match.

19 March 2022	Tricolor Municipal (5)	0–3; Awarded	Lautaro de Buin (3)
Note: Match awarded to Lautaro de Buin as Tricolor Municipal did not have a suitable stadium to host the match.

20 March 2022	La Higuera (6)	2–2 (4–3 p)	San Bernardo Unido (6)	La Calera
12:00 UTC−3	Bravo 43', 83'	Report	Maldonado 22'; Ortiz 70'	Stadium: Municipal Nicolás Chahuán Nazar; Referee: Diego Yáñez

20 March 2022	Cóndor de Pichidegua (6)	0–6	General Velásquez (3)	Santa Cruz
18:00 UTC−3		Report	Uribe 5'; Serrano 45'; Alegría 50'; Pino 77', 82'; López 89'	Stadium: Municipal Joaquín Muñoz García; Referee: Reinerio Alvarado

20 March 2022	Independiente de Cauquenes (3)	7–0	Unión Bellavista (6)	Talca
18:00 UTC−3	Vallejos 20', 60'; Navarro 34'; Díaz 35'; González 39'; Aravena 48'; Godoy 90'	Report		Stadium: Fiscal; Referee: Felipe Jara

20 March 2022	Provincial Ranco (4)	4–3	Deportes Valdivia (3)	La Unión
18:00 UTC−3	Mellado 5'; Sánchez 23'; Roa 41', 58'	Report	Álvarez 45'; Filún 52'; Cárdenas 57'	Stadium: Municipal Carlos Vogel Meyer; Referee: Mathías Riquelme

20 March 2022	Provincial Ovalle (4)	1–1 (3–2 p)	San Marcos de Arica (3)	Ovalle
18:00 UTC−3	Leyton 90+7'	Report	Mesías 40'	Stadium: Diaguita; Referee: Franco Arrué

20 March 2022	Deportes Quillón (4)	0–3; Awarded	Iberia (3)
Note: Match awarded to Iberia as Deportes Quillón did not have a suitable stadium to host the match.

20 March 2022	Aguará (5)	0–3; Awarded	Rodelindo Román (3)
Note: Match awarded to Rodelindo Román as Aguará did not have a suitable stadium to host the match.

== Second stage ==
The pairings for the second stage were announced by the ANFP on 20 March 2022. The 14 first stage winners, as well as San Bernardo Unido who advanced as best loser, were drawn against 15 Primera B de Chile teams according to geographical and safety criteria, with the remaining two Primera B teams being drawn against each other. Like the previous stage of the competition, ties in this round were single-legged, with the team from the lower tier hosting the match. Matches in this round were played from 26 to 28 March 2022.

26 March 2022	La Higuera (6)	0–4	Santiago Wanderers (2)	Quillota
20:00 UTC−3		Report	Rojas 27'; Arce 42' (pen.); Sanhueza 63'; Amilivia 78'	Stadium: Bicentenario Lucio Fariña Fernández; Referee: Miguel Araos

27 March 2022	General Velásquez (3)	3–0	Deportes Santa Cruz (2)	San Vicente de Tagua Tagua
17:00 UTC−3	Troncoso 40'; Villablanca 60'; Herrera 79'	Report		Stadium: Municipal Augusto Rodríguez; Referee: Claudio Cevasco

27 March 2022	Iberia (3)	0–2	Deportes Temuco (2)	Los Ángeles
17:00 UTC−3		Report	Águila 63'; Villagra 79'	Stadium: Municipal de Los Ángeles; Referee: Rafael Troncoso

27 March 2022	Provincial Ranco (4)	1–4	Deportes Puerto Montt (2)	La Unión
17:00 UTC−3	Pacheco 4'	Report	Varas 11', 74'; Lemmo 21'; Orellana 90'	Stadium: Municipal Carlos Vogel Meyer; Referee: Jorge Oses

27 March 2022	San Antonio Unido (3)	0–0 (6–5 p)	San Luis (2)	Colina
17:30 UTC−3		Report		Stadium: Municipal Manuel Rojas del Río; Referee: Claudio Díaz

27 March 2022	San Bernardo Unido (6)	0–6	Magallanes (2)	San Bernardo, Santiago
17:30 UTC−3		Report	Gaínza 20'; Salazar 50', 75'; Abruzzese 65'; Vicuña 67'; Crovetto 84'	Stadium: Municipal Luis Navarro Avilés; Referee: Francisco Soriano

27 March 2022	Cobreloa (2)	2–0	Deportes Iquique (2)	Calama
18:00 UTC−3	Gutiérrez 66'; Sepúlveda 89'	Report		Stadium: Zorros del Desierto; Referee: Nicolás Millas

27 March 2022	Provincial Ovalle (4)	3–2	Deportes Copiapó (2)	Ovalle
18:00 UTC−3	Cifuentes 21', 36'; Vargas 34'	Report	Quinteros 54'; Pontigo 87'	Stadium: Diaguita; Referee: Pedro Morales

27 March 2022	Lautaro de Buin (3)	0–1	Santiago Morning (2)	Rancagua
18:00 UTC−3		Report	Valdés 61'	Stadium: El Teniente; Referee: Juan Comas

27 March 2022	Independiente de Cauquenes (3)	2–2 (4–3 p)	Rangers (2)	Talca
18:00 UTC−3	Díaz 41', 76'	Report	Altamirano 80'; Felipe 90+5'	Stadium: Fiscal; Referee: Gustavo Ahumada

27 March 2022	Deportes Concepción (3)	0–2	Fernández Vial (2)	Concepción
18:15 UTC−3		Report	Carrasco 52'; Hernández 90+4'	Stadium: Ester Roa; Referee: Felipe González

27 March 2022	Trasandino (3)	1–3	Unión San Felipe (2)	Quillota
21:00 UTC−3	Araya 50'	Report	Castro 69', 90+3'; Gallegos 85'	Stadium: Bicentenario Lucio Fariña Fernández; Referee: Gastón Philippe

28 March 2022	Rodelindo Román (3)	0–2	Deportes Melipilla (2)	Colina
17:30 UTC−3		Report	Cisternas 11' (o.g.); Arenas 60'	Stadium: Municipal Manuel Rojas del Río; Referee: José Vergara

28 March 2022	Colo-Colito (6)	0–9	Universidad de Concepción (2)	Concepción
18:00 UTC−3		Report	Guerreño 15', 39'; Ragusa 36'; Castillo 45', 51', 58'; Bogmis 72'; Molina 85'; Lauler 90'	Stadium: Ester Roa; Referee: Dione Rissios

28 March 2022	Deportes Limache (3)	2–1	Deportes Recoleta (2)	Quillota
18:00 UTC−3	González 28'; Morales 76'	Report	Borrego 29'	Stadium: Bicentenario Lucio Fariña Fernández; Referee: Diego Yáñez

28 March 2022	Real San Joaquín (3)	0–3	Barnechea (2)	Valparaíso
18:00 UTC−3		Report	Arguinarena 48'; Cid 60'; Araya 90+6'	Stadium: Elías Figueroa Brander; Referee: Emilio Bastías

== Bracket ==
Third stage
11	Cobresal	2	1	3
24	Barnechea	1	1	2
2	General Velásquez	1	2	3
14	Universidad de Chile	2	2	4
10	Audax Italiano	1	3	4
29	San Antonio Unido	2	1	3
16	Unión San Felipe	1	0	1
18	Universidad Católica	3	3	6
13	Deportes Limache	1	1	2
21	Deportes Antofagasta	2	2	4
25	Curicó Unido (p)	1	1	2 (2)
26	Santiago Wanderers	1	1	2 (0)
7	Fernández Vial	1	0	1
15	O'Higgins	0	2	2
23	Unión Española	5	1	6
28	Provincial Ovalle	0	0	0
3	Deportes Puerto Montt	2	0	2
6	Huachipato	2	3	5
5	Deportes Melipilla	0	1	1
22	Coquimbo Unido	0	2	2
8	Ñublense (p)	1	1	2 (4)
32	Independiente de Cauquenes	2	0	2 (2)
19	Colo-Colo	0	5	5
20	Deportes Temuco	0	1	1
1	Universidad de Concepción	4	2	6
9	Deportes La Serena	3	1	4
12	Magallanes	1	2	3
27	Everton	1	1	2
4	Santiago Morning (p)	1	1	2 (4)
30	Unión La Calera	2	0	2 (3)
17	Cobreloa (p)	0	1	1 (7)
31	Palestino	1	0	1 (6)

Round of 16
11	Cobresal	1	0	1
14	Universidad de Chile	1	1	2
10	Audax Italiano	0	0	0
18	Universidad Católica	2	3	5
21	Deportes Antofagasta	4	1	5
25	Curicó Unido	2	2	4
15	O'Higgins	1	0	1
23	Unión Española	3	1	4
6	Huachipato	1	0	1
22	Coquimbo Unido	0	0	0
8	Ñublense	2	1	3
19	Colo-Colo	1	1	2
1	Universidad de Concepción	0	1	1
12	Magallanes	2	4	6
4	Santiago Morning	0	0	0
17	Cobreloa	0	1	1

Quarter-finals
14	Universidad de Chile	1	2	3
18	Universidad Católica	0	2	2
21	Deportes Antofagasta	1	1	2
23	Unión Española	2	4	6
6	Huachipato (p)	1	1	2 (6)
8	Ñublense	0	2	2 (5)
12	Magallanes (p)	0	1	1 (4)
17	Cobreloa	0	1	1 (2)

Semi-finals
14	Universidad de Chile	0	0	0
23	Unión Española	0	1	1
6	Huachipato	0	1	1
12	Magallanes	1	1	2

Final
23	Unión Española	2 (6)
12	Magallanes (p)	2 (7)

== Third stage ==
The draw for the third stage and subsequent phases was held on 10 May 2022. The 16 Primera División teams entered the competition at this stage and were drawn against the 16 second stage winners. The team with the highest seed assigned in the draw hosted the second leg. The first legs were played from 16 to 19 June and the second legs were played from 23 to 27 June 2022.

Team 1	Agg.	Team 2	1st leg	2nd leg
Colo-Colo (1)	5–1	Deportes Temuco (2)	0–0	5–1
Ñublense (1)	2–2 (4–2 p)	Independiente de Cauquenes (3)	1–2	1–0
Deportes Melipilla (2)	1–2	Coquimbo Unido (1)	0–0	1–2
Deportes Puerto Montt (2)	2–5	Huachipato (1)	2–2	0–3
Cobreloa (2)	1–1 (7–6 p)	Palestino (1)	0–1	1–0
Santiago Morning (2)	2–2 (4–3 p)	Unión La Calera (1)	1–2	1–0
Universidad de Concepción (2)	6–4	Deportes La Serena (1)	4–3	2–1
Magallanes (2)	3–2	Everton (1)	1–1	2–1
Unión Española (1)	6–0	Provincial Ovalle (4)	5–0	1–0
Fernández Vial (2)	1–2	O'Higgins (1)	1–0	0–2
Deportes Limache (3)	2–4	Deportes Antofagasta (1)	1–2	1–2
Curicó Unido (1)	2–2 (2–0 p)	Santiago Wanderers (2)	1–1	1–1
Audax Italiano (1)	4–3	San Antonio Unido (3)	1–2	3–1
Unión San Felipe (2)	1–6	Universidad Católica (1)	1–3	0–3
Cobresal (1)	3–2	Barnechea (2)	2–1	1–0
General Velásquez (3)	3–4	Universidad de Chile (1)	1–2	2–2

=== First leg ===
16 June 2022	Audax Italiano	1–2	San Antonio Unido	La Pintana, Santiago
15:00 UTC−4	Henríquez 58' (pen.)	Report	Castañeda 44'; B. Leiva 88'	Stadium: Municipal; Referee: Víctor Abarzúa

17 June 2022	Curicó Unido	1–1	Santiago Wanderers	Curicó
19:00 UTC−4	Bustamante 89'	Report	Amilivia 73'	Stadium: La Granja; Referee: Ángelo Hermosilla

18 June 2022	Magallanes	1–1	Everton	San Bernardo, Santiago
12:30 UTC−4	Zapata 54'	Report	Cuevas 17'	Stadium: Municipal Luis Navarro Avilés; Referee: María Belén Carvajal

18 June 2022	Santiago Morning	1–2	Unión La Calera	La Pintana, Santiago
15:00 UTC−4	Barrera 82' (pen.)	Report	Alarcón 28', 53'	Stadium: Municipal; Referee: Claudio Aranda

18 June 2022	Cobresal	2–1	Barnechea	El Salvador
15:00 UTC−4	González 29'; Gaete 60'	Report	Lara 42'	Stadium: El Cobre; Referee: Omar Oporto

18 June 2022	Unión San Felipe	1–3	Universidad Católica	Quillota
15:30 UTC−4	Castro 18'	Report	Zampedri 11', 90'; Fuenzalida 25'	Stadium: Bicentenario Lucio Fariña Fernández; Referee: Fernando Véjar

18 June 2022	Ñublense	1–2	Independiente de Cauquenes	Chillán
17:00 UTC−4	Reynero 54'	Report	Arce 11', 51'	Stadium: Bicentenario Nelson Oyarzún Arenas; Referee: Jorge Oses

18 June 2022	Universidad de Concepción	4–3	Deportes La Serena	Concepción
17:30 UTC−4	Guerreño 25', 38'; Godoy 41'; Fuentealba 78' (o.g.)	Report	Suazo 17'; Godoy 48' (o.g.); Paredes 60'	Stadium: Ester Roa; Referee: Cristian Galaz

18 June 2022	Deportes Puerto Montt	2–2	Huachipato	Puerto Montt
18:00 UTC−4	Antiñirre 10'; Orellana 20'	Report	Gazzolo 29'; C. Martínez 90+1'	Stadium: Chinquihue; Referee: Juan Lara

18 June 2022	Colo-Colo	0–0	Deportes Temuco	Macul, Santiago
18:00 UTC−4		Report		Stadium: Monumental David Arellano; Referee: Rodrigo Carvajal

19 June 2022	Deportes Limache	1–2	Deportes Antofagasta	Quillota
12:00 UTC−4	Huerta 13' (pen.)	Report	Orellana 79'; Souper 90+1'	Stadium: Bicentenario Lucio Fariña Fernández; Referee: Dione Rissios

19 June 2022	Deportes Melipilla	0–0	Coquimbo Unido	La Pintana, Santiago
12:30 UTC−4		Report		Stadium: Municipal; Attendance: 464; Referee: Patricio Blanca

19 June 2022	Cobreloa	0–1	Palestino	Calama
12:30 UTC−4		Report	Farías 6'	Stadium: Zorros del Desierto; Referee: José Cabero

19 June 2022	General Velásquez	1–2	Universidad de Chile	Rancagua
15:30 UTC−4	Serrano 50'	Report	Fernandes 33', 58'	Stadium: El Teniente; Referee: Héctor Jona

19 June 2022	Fernández Vial	1–0	O'Higgins	Concepción
18:00 UTC−4	Vranjicán 89'	Report		Stadium: Ester Roa; Referee: Felipe Jara

19 June 2022	Unión Española	5–0	Provincial Ovalle	Independencia, Santiago
18:00 UTC−4	Garate 18', 39' (pen.), 59'; Piñeiro 28'; Conelli 53'	Report		Stadium: Santa Laura; Referee: Rafael Troncoso

=== Second leg ===
23 June 2022	Deportes Temuco	1–5 (1–5 agg.)	Colo-Colo	Temuco
18:00 UTC−4	Concha 73'	Report	Lucero 5', 19', 60'; Costa 32' (pen.), 62'	Stadium: Municipal Germán Becker; Attendance: 9,947; Referee: Julio Bascuñán

24 June 2022	San Antonio Unido	1–3 (3–4 agg.)	Audax Italiano	Quillota
19:00 UTC−4	Matamala 65'	Report	Palacios 20', 68'; Sepúlveda 71'	Stadium: Bicentenario Lucio Fariña Fernández; Referee: Cristian Garay

25 June 2022	Deportes La Serena	1–2 (4–6 agg.)	Universidad de Concepción	La Serena
12:30 UTC−4	Cáceres 67'	Report	Guerreño 24'; González 77'	Stadium: La Portada; Referee: Claudio Cevasco

25 June 2022	Barnechea	1–1 (2–3 agg.)	Cobresal	Lo Barnechea, Santiago
15:00 UTC−4	Cid 29'	Report	Céspedes 84'	Stadium: Municipal; Referee: Juan Sepúlveda

25 June 2022	Independiente de Cauquenes	0–1 (1–1 agg.) (2–4 p)	Ñublense	Talca
15:00 UTC−4		Report	Mateos 55'	Stadium: Fiscal; Referee: Nicolás Millas
	Penalties
	Cabrera (penalty missed); Cisterna (penalty scored); Aguirre (penalty scored); Téllez (penalty missed)		(penalty scored) Vargas; (penalty scored) Reyes; (penalty scored) Mateos; (penalty scored) Guerra

25 June 2022	Everton	1–2 (2–3 agg.)	Magallanes	Viña del Mar
15:00 UTC−4	Campos López 80'	Report	Alfaro 51'; Cortés 90+2' (pen.)	Stadium: Sausalito; Referee: Héctor Jona

25 June 2022	Provincial Ovalle	0–1 (0–6 agg.)	Unión Española	Ovalle
15:00 UTC−4		Report	Garate 48'	Stadium: Diaguita; Referee: Víctor Abarzúa

25 June 2022	Universidad Católica	3–0 (6–1 agg.)	Unión San Felipe	Las Condes, Santiago
17:30 UTC−4	Núñez 11'; Valencia 77', 88'	Report		Stadium: San Carlos de Apoquindo; Attendance: 8,281; Referee: Piero Maza

25 June 2022	O'Higgins	2–0 (2–1 agg.)	Fernández Vial	Rancagua
20:00 UTC−4	Hormazábal 51'; Garrido 72' (o.g.)	Report		Stadium: El Teniente; Referee: Matías Quila

26 June 2022	Deportes Antofagasta	2–1 (4–2 agg.)	Deportes Limache	Antofagasta
12:30 UTC−4	Collao 2'; López 69'	Report	Inostroza 63'	Stadium: Bicentenario Calvo y Bascuñán; Referee: Felipe Jara

26 June 2022	Palestino	0–1 (1–1 agg.) (6–7 p)	Cobreloa	La Cisterna, Santiago
15:00 UTC−4		Report	Cáceres 41'	Stadium: Municipal; Referee: Manuel Vergara
	Penalties
	Salas (penalty scored); Suárez (penalty scored); Véjar (penalty scored); Martínez (penalty scored); Pardo (penalty scored); Sappa (penalty scored); Benítez (penalty missed)		(penalty scored) Escalante; (penalty scored) Ríos; (penalty scored) Becerra; (penalty scored) Ortiz; (penalty scored) González; (penalty scored) San Juan; (penalty scored) Espejo

26 June 2022	Santiago Wanderers	1–1 (2–2 agg.) (0–2 p)	Curicó Unido	Valparaíso
15:00 UTC−4	Plaza 26'	Report	Bustamante 2'	Stadium: Elías Figueroa Brander; Referee: Juan Lara
	Penalties
	Muñoz (penalty missed); León (penalty missed); Sanhueza (penalty missed); Retamal (penalty missed)		(penalty missed) Castro; (penalty scored) Oyarzo; (penalty scored) Leiva

26 June 2022	Huachipato	3–0 (5–2 agg.)	Deportes Puerto Montt	Talcahuano
17:30 UTC−4	Martínez 5', 58'; Montes 36'	Report		Stadium: Huachipato-CAP Acero; Referee: Fernando Véjar

26 June 2022	Coquimbo Unido	2–1 (2–1 agg.)	Deportes Melipilla	Coquimbo
17:30 UTC−4	Huanca 44'; Abrigo 59'	Report	Lopes 5'	Stadium: Bicentenario Francisco Sánchez Rumoroso; Referee: Miguel Araos

26 June 2022	Unión La Calera	0–1 (2–2 agg.) (3–4 p)	Santiago Morning	La Calera
17:30 UTC−4		Report	Pino 63'	Stadium: Municipal Nicolás Chahuán Nazar; Referee: Diego Flores
	Penalties
	Sáez (penalty missed); Orellana (penalty scored); Castellani (penalty scored); Alarcón (penalty scored); Vidangossy (penalty missed)		(penalty scored) Ahumada; (penalty scored) Vásquez; (penalty scored) Carvajal; (penalty scored) Ayala

27 June 2022	Universidad de Chile	2–2 (4–3 agg.)	General Velásquez	Independencia, Santiago
16:00 UTC−4	Fernandes 3'; Poblete 71'	Report	Serrano 79' (pen.); Villablanca 85'	Stadium: Santa Laura; Referee: Benjamín Saravia

== Round of 16 ==
Team 1	Agg.	Team 2	1st leg	2nd leg
Ñublense (1)	3–2	Colo-Colo (1)	2–1	1–1
Huachipato (1)	1–0	Coquimbo Unido (1)	1–0	0–0
Santiago Morning (2)	0–1	Cobreloa (2)	0–0	0–1
Universidad de Concepción (2)	1–6	Magallanes (2)	0–2	1–4
O'Higgins (1)	1–4	Unión Española (1)	1–3	0–1
Deportes Antofagasta (1)	5–4	Curicó Unido (1)	4–2	1–2
Audax Italiano (1)	0–5	Universidad Católica (1)	0–2	0–3
Cobresal (1)	1–2	Universidad de Chile (1)	1–1	0–1

=== First leg ===
16 August 2022	Santiago Morning	0–0	Cobreloa	La Pintana, Santiago
15:00 UTC−4		Report		Stadium: Municipal; Referee: Juan Sepúlveda

16 August 2022	Audax Italiano	0–2	Universidad Católica	La Florida, Santiago
18:00 UTC−4		Report	Ampuero 45'; Zampedri 90+5'	Stadium: Bicentenario de La Florida; Referee: Rodrigo Carvajal

16 August 2022	Universidad de Concepción	0–2	Magallanes	Concepción
20:45 UTC−4		Report	Cortés 63'; Salazar 78' (pen.)	Stadium: Ester Roa; Referee: Miguel Araos
Note: Match originally scheduled at 20:30 local time but pushed back for 15 minutes due to a delay in the previous match.

17 August 2022	Deportes Antofagasta	4–2	Curicó Unido	Antofagasta
17:00 UTC−4	Souper 40'; Cuadra 47'; Uribe 80'; Torres 83'	Report	Castro 50' (pen.); Coelho 66' (pen.)	Stadium: Bicentenario Calvo y Bascuñán; Referee: Gustavo Ahumada

17 August 2022	Ñublense	2–1	Colo-Colo	Chillán
18:00 UTC−4	Caroca 79'; Cerezo 86'	Report	Lucero 77'	Stadium: Bicentenario Nelson Oyarzún Arenas; Referee: Julio Bascuñán

17 August 2022	O'Higgins	1–3	Unión Española	Rancagua
20:30 UTC−4	Ogaz 21'	Report	Piñeiro 51'; Espinoza 54'; Yáñez 56'	Stadium: El Teniente; Referee: Francisco Gilabert

18 August 2022	Huachipato	1–0	Coquimbo Unido	Talcahuano
18:00 UTC−4	Sánchez Sotelo 41'	Report		Stadium: Huachipato-CAP Acero; Attendance: 851; Referee: Matías Quila

18 August 2022	Cobresal	1–1	Universidad de Chile	El Salvador
20:30 UTC−4	Waterman 65'	Report	Villalba 42' (o.g.)	Stadium: El Cobre; Referee: José Cabero

=== Second leg ===
20 August 2022	Magallanes	4–1 (6–1 agg.)	Universidad de Concepción	San Bernardo, Santiago
13:15 UTC−4	Salazar 11'; Zapata 21', 37'; Díaz 90'	Report	Ramírez 44'	Stadium: Municipal Luis Navarro Avilés; Referee: Héctor Jona

20 August 2022	Cobreloa	1–0 (1–0 agg.)	Santiago Morning	Calama
15:45 UTC−4	Gutiérrez 84' (pen.)	Report		Stadium: Zorros del Desierto; Attendance: 3,790; Referee: Felipe González

20 August 2022	Universidad Católica	3–0 (5–0 agg.)	Audax Italiano	Las Condes, Santiago
18:30 UTC−4	Zampedri 19', 80'; Alvarado 22' (o.g.)	Report		Stadium: San Carlos de Apoquindo; Referee: Cristián Garay
Note: Match ended after 85 minutes of play due to crowd disturbances.

21 August 2022	Curicó Unido	2–1 (4–5 agg.)	Deportes Antofagasta	Curicó
12:00 UTC−4	Bustamante 25'; Castro 34'	Report	Torres 24'	Stadium: La Granja; Referee: Juan Lara

21 August 2022	Colo-Colo	1–1 (2–3 agg.)	Ñublense	Macul, Santiago
17:30 UTC−4	Falcón 77'	Report	Cordero 60'	Stadium: Monumental David Arellano; Referee: Nicolás Gamboa

21 August 2022	Unión Española	1–0 (4–1 agg.)	O'Higgins	La Pintana, Santiago
20:00 UTC−4	Rivero 90+4'	Report		Stadium: Municipal; Referee: Manuel Vergara

22 August 2022	Universidad de Chile	1–0 (2–1 agg.)	Cobresal	Valparaíso
18:00 UTC−4	Osorio 10'	Report		Stadium: Elías Figueroa Brander; Referee: Piero Maza

22 August 2022	Coquimbo Unido	0–0 (0–1 agg.)	Huachipato	Coquimbo
20:30 UTC−4		Report		Stadium: Bicentenario Francisco Sánchez Rumoroso; Referee: Fernando Véjar

== Quarter-finals ==
Team 1	Agg.	Team 2	1st leg	2nd leg
Huachipato (1)	2–2 (6–5 p)	Ñublense (1)	1–0	1–2
Magallanes (2)	1–1 (4–2 p)	Cobreloa (2)	0–0	1–1
Deportes Antofagasta (1)	2–6	Unión Española (1)	1–2	1–4
Universidad de Chile (1)	3–2	Universidad Católica (1)	1–0	2–2

=== First leg ===
23 September 2022	Magallanes	0–0	Cobreloa	San Bernardo, Santiago
12:30 UTC−3		Report		Stadium: Municipal Luis Navarro Avilés; Referee: Héctor Jona

23 September 2022	Deportes Antofagasta	1–2	Unión Española	Antofagasta
20:00 UTC−3	Uribe 17'	Report	Massri 12'; Rivero 43'	Stadium: Bicentenario Calvo y Bascuñán; Referee: Ángelo Hermosilla

24 September 2022	Huachipato	1–0	Ñublense	Talcahuano
20:00 UTC−3	C. Martínez 69'	Report		Stadium: Huachipato-CAP Acero; Referee: Benjamín Saravia

25 September 2022	Universidad de Chile	1–0	Universidad Católica	Independencia, Santiago
17:30 UTC−3	Palacios 10'	Report		Stadium: Santa Laura; Referee: Nicolás Gamboa

=== Second leg ===
27 September 2022	Unión Española	4–1 (6–2 agg.)	Deportes Antofagasta	Independencia, Santiago
18:00 UTC−3	Acevedo 27'; Rivero 67'; Piñeiro 70'; Garate 84'	Report	Pérez 31'	Stadium: Santa Laura; Referee: Julio Bascuñán

27 September 2022	Ñublense	2–1 (2–2 agg.) (5–6 p)	Huachipato	Chillán
20:30 UTC−3	Mateos 34'; Aravena 68'	Report	Montes 12'	Stadium: Bicentenario Nelson Oyarzún Arenas; Referee: Piero Maza
	Penalties
	Cerezo (penalty missed); Reyes (penalty scored); Cordero (penalty scored); Mateos (penalty scored); Rivera (penalty scored); Pinto (penalty missed); Guerrero (penalty scored); Meza (penalty missed)		(penalty scored) Montes; (penalty scored) Lobos; (penalty scored) Cañete; (penalty scored) Torres; (penalty missed) Mazzantti; (penalty missed) Gazzolo; (penalty scored) Urra; (penalty scored) Córdova

28 September 2022	Universidad Católica	2–2 (2–3 agg.)	Universidad de Chile	Valparaíso
17:30 UTC−3	Zampedri 4' (pen.); Tapia 90+7'	Report	Palacios 13', 72'	Stadium: Elías Figueroa Brander; Referee: Felipe González
Note: Match suspended after 6 minutes of play due to crowd disturbances, with Universidad Católica leading 1–0 at the time of suspension. It was resumed on 13 October 2022, 19:00 local time at Estadio El Teniente in Rancagua, behind closed doors.

29 September 2022	Cobreloa	1–1 (1–1 agg.) (2–4 p)	Magallanes	Calama
17:30 UTC−3	Escalante 55' (pen.)	Report	Poblete 86'	Stadium: Zorros del Desierto; Attendance: 6,427; Referee: José Cabero
	Penalties
	Cano (penalty missed); San Juan (penalty scored); Ballini (penalty missed); Cáceres (penalty scored)		(penalty scored) Cortés; (penalty scored) Piñero; (penalty scored) Flores; (penalty missed) Aránguiz; (penalty scored) Salazar

== Semi-finals ==
Team 1	Agg.	Team 2	1st leg	2nd leg
Huachipato (1)	1–2	Magallanes (2)	0–1	1–1
Universidad de Chile (1)	0–1	Unión Española (1)	0–0	0–1

=== First leg ===
12 October 2022	Huachipato	0–1	Magallanes	Talcahuano
20:00 UTC−3		Report	Zapata 25'	Stadium: Huachipato-CAP Acero; Attendance: 3,117; Referee: Juan Lara

26 October 2022	Universidad de Chile	0–0	Unión Española	Talcahuano
18:00 UTC−3		Report		Stadium: Huachipato-CAP Acero; Attendance: 6,453; Referee: José Cabero
Note: Match originally scheduled for 16 October 2022, 15:00 local time but suspended due to the lack of an available stadium. It was eventually rescheduled to 26 October 2022, 18:00 local time.

=== Second leg ===
16 October 2022	Magallanes	1–1 (2–1 agg.)	Huachipato	San Bernardo, Santiago
12:00 UTC−3	Flores 75'	Report	Baeza 82'	Stadium: Municipal Luis Navarro Avilés; Attendance: 2,213; Referee: Felipe González

2 November 2022	Unión Española	1–0 (1–0 agg.)	Universidad de Chile	Independencia, Santiago
19:30 UTC−3	M. Fernández 86'	Report		Stadium: Santa Laura; Attendance: 3,591; Referee: Julio Bascuñán

== Final ==
13 November 2022
18:00 UTC−3

Unión Española (1)	2–2	Magallanes (2)
Garate 31'; D. Acevedo 77'	Report	Espinoza 62'; Flores 72'
Penalties
Leyton (penalty scored); Larenas (penalty missed); Conelli (penalty scored); Piñeiro (penalty scored); Espinoza (penalty scored); Villagra (penalty scored); D. Acevedo (penalty scored); Barrios (penalty missed)	6–7	(penalty scored) Cortés; (penalty scored) Villanueva; (penalty missed) Piñero; (penalty scored) Jones; (penalty scored) A. Acevedo; (penalty scored) Aránguiz; (penalty scored) Vicuña; (penalty scored) Espinoza

Estadio El Teniente, Rancagua
Attendance: 11,709
Referee: Roberto Tobar

== Top scorers ==
Rank	Name	Club	Goals
1	(Argentina) Fernando Zampedri	Universidad Católica	6
2	(Argentina) Leandro Garate	Unión Española	5
2	(Paraguay) Gustavo Guerreño	Universidad de Concepción	5
2	(Chile) David Salazar	Magallanes	5
5	(Argentina) Juan Martín Lucero	Colo-Colo	4

Source: Campeonato Chileno

== See also ==
- 2022 Chilean Primera División
- 2022 Primera B de Chile
- 2022 Supercopa de Chile
