= Tomás Aránguiz =

Chilean footballer

Personal information
- Full name: Tomás Benjamín Aránguiz Aránguiz
- Date of birth: 15 April 1997 (age 29)
- Place of birth: Independencia, Santiago, Chile
- Height: 1.76 m (5 ft 9 in)
- Position: Midfielder

Team information
- Current team: Cobreloa

Youth career
- 2005–2009: Colo-Colo
- Quilicura (city team)
- 2011–2015: Barnechea

Senior career*
| Years | Team | Apps | (Gls) |
| 2015–2017 | Barnechea | 39 | (4) |
| 2017 | Deportes Santa Cruz | 18 | (3) |
| 2018–2025 | Magallanes | 193 | (15) |
| 2026– | Cobreloa | 0 | (0) |

International career
| 2016 | Chile U20 | 4 | (0) |
- * Club domestic league appearances and goals as of 18 December 2025

Tomás Benjamín Aránguiz Aránguiz (born Tomás Benjamín Valenzuela Aránguiz; 15 April 1997) is a Chilean footballer who plays as a midfielder for Cobreloa.

== Club career ==
As a youth player, Aránguiz was with Colo-Colo between the ages of 8 and 12 and the Quilicura city team before joining the Barnechea under-15 team. He made his senior debut with Barnechea in the 2015–16 season and won the 2016–17 Segunda División Profesional de Chile.

In the second half of 2017, Aránguiz played for Deportes Santa Cruz.

In January 2018, Aránguiz signed with Magallanes. A player during a successful stint of the club, he won the 2022 Primera B, the 2022 Copa Chile and the 2023 Supercopa de Chile. He continued with them for the 2023 Primera División and took part in both the 2023 Copa Libertadores and 2023 Copa Sudamericana. He left them at the end of the 2025 season.

On 16 December 2025, Aránguiz signed with Cobreloa.

== International career ==
Aránguiz, then named Tomás Valenzuela Aránguiz, represented Chile U20 under Héctor Robles in the context of preparations for the 2017 South American Championship.

== Honours ==
Barnechea

- Segunda División Profesional de Chile: 2016-17

Magallanes

- Primera B de Chile: 2022
- Copa Chile: 2022
- Supercopa de Chile: 2023

Cobreloa

- Primera B de Chile: 2026
