= Felipe Espinoza =

Chilean footballer

Personal information
- Full name: Felipe Ignacio Espinoza Ramírez
- Date of birth: 20 September 1999 (age 27)
- Place of birth: Renca, Santiago, Chile
- Height: 1.79 m (5 ft 10 in)
- Position: Left-back

Team information
- Current team: Deportes Iquique

Youth career
- Cobreloa
- 2016–2017: Magallanes

Senior career*
| Years | Team | Apps | (Gls) |
| 2018–2024 | Magallanes | 140 | (1) |
| 2025 | Unión Española | 15 | (1) |
| 2026– | Deportes Iquique | 0 | (0) |
- * Club domestic league appearances and goals as of 5 January 2026

Felipe Ignacio Espinoza Ramírez (born 20 September 1999) is a Chilean footballer who plays as a left-back for Deportes Iquique.

== Club career ==
A product of the Cobreloa youth system, Espinoza joined Magallanes in 2016 and made his professional debut in 2018.

A player during a successful stint of Magallanes, Espinoza won the 2022 Primera B, the 2022 Copa Chile and the 2023 Supercopa de Chile. He continued with them for the 2023 Primera División and took part in both the 2023 Copa Libertadores and the 2023 Copa Sudamericana.

In December 2024, Espinoza signed with Unión Española in the Chilean Primera División.

On 5 January 2026, Espinoza joined Deportes Iquique.
