= Iván Vásquez =

Chilean footballer (born 1985)

Personal information
- Full name: Iván Gonzalo Vásquez Quilodrán
- Date of birth: 13 August 1985 (age 41)
- Place of birth: Lautaro, Chile
- Height: 1.68 m (5 ft 6 in)
- Position: Midfielder

Team information
- Current team: Magallanes (youth) (coach)

Youth career
- 2000–2003: Universidad Católica

Senior career*
Years	Team	Apps	(Gls)
2003–2009	Universidad Católica	148	(4)
2006	→ Cobreloa (loan)	13	(0)
2009–2011	O'Higgins	65	(1)
2011–2019	Audax Italiano	219	(2)
2020–2023	Magallanes	90	(0)
2024	Unión San Felipe	17	(0)
Total		552	(7)

International career
2005	Chile U20	4	(0)

Managerial career
- 2025–: Magallanes (youth)
- 2025: Magallanes (caretaker)
- * Club domestic league appearances and goals

Iván Gonzalo Vásquez Quilodrán (born 13 August 1985) is a Chilean football coach and former player who played as a midfielder.

== Club career ==
Born in Lautaro, Cautín Province, Vásquez joined Club Deportivo Universidad Católica's youth system in 2000 at the age of 15. He made his Chilean Primera División debuts three years later, and was part of the squads that won the 2005 Clausura and finished in second position at the 2007 Apertura; in 2006, he was loaned to fellow league club Cobreloa.

In 2009, Vásquez joined O'Higgins FC. He scored his first competitive goal for his new team on 21 November 2010, playing the full 90 minutes in a 1–1 away draw against Unión Española.

Vásquez moved to Audax Italiano on a three-year contract on 10 July 2011, going on to be a midfield mainstay in the following seasons.

Vásquez spent four seasons with Magallanes from 2020 to 2023, winning three titles. In 2024, he joined Unión San Felipe.

== International career ==
Vásquez represented Chile at the 2005 FIFA World Youth Championship in the Netherlands, playing all the games in an eventual round-of-16 exit.

== Coaching career ==
Vásquez graduated as a football manager at INAF (National Football Institute), while playing for Magallanes, alongside his fellows César Cortés and Albert Acevedo.

Following his retirement, Vásquez joined the coaching staff of the Magallanes youth ranks. In June 2025, he assumed as interim coach of the senior team for a day.

== Personal life ==
Vásquez Quilodrán is of Mapuche descent.

== Honours ==
Universidad Católica

- Primera División de Chile: 2005 Clausura

Magallanes

- Primera B de Chile: 2022
- Copa Chile: 2022
- Supercopa de Chile: 2023
