= Nicolás Núñez =

Chilean footballer (born 1984)

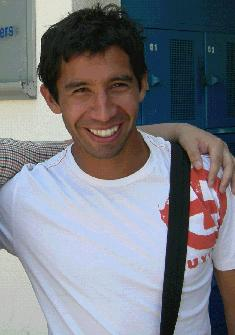
- Núñez in 2007

Personal information
- Full name: Nicolás Arnaldo Núñez Rojas
- Date of birth: 12 September 1984 (age 42)
- Place of birth: Santiago, Chile
- Height: 1.75 m (5 ft 9 in)
- Position: Midfielder

Youth career
- Colo-Colo
- 1997–2001: Universidad Católica

Senior career*
Years	Team	Apps	(Gls)
2001–2008	Universidad Católica	49	(4)
2004	→ Deportes Puerto Montt (loan)	33	(6)
2006	→ Albacete (loan)	0	(0)
2007	→ Everton (loan)	17	(3)
2009–2010	Unión Española	36	(2)
2011	Ñublense	17	(2)
2012–2015	Huachipato	75	(10)
2015	San Marcos	5	(0)
2016–2019	Magallanes	79	(6)

Managerial career
- 2019–2021: Magallanes (assistant)
- 2021–2023: Magallanes
- 2023–2024: Universidad Católica
- * Club domestic league appearances and goals

Nicolás Arnaldo Núñez Rojas, nicknamed Nico, (born 12 September 1984) is a Chilean football manager and former player who played as a midfielder.

== Club career ==
Núñez began his career with Universidad Católica in 2001, and subsequently played for Albacete Balompié in 2006 and Everton de Viña del Mar in 2007.

He participated in the South American championships in Arequipa, Peru, alongside Mauricio Pinilla, Mark Gonzalez, Luis Jimenez and debuted with U. Católica in the first division, against University of Chile. In that institution, he always admitted that he stayed in good shape, even achieving goal scoring.

He had a season loan to Puerto Montt Sports, where he scored many goals and returned to the Catholic University. Then he went to the preseason Spanish club, Albacete, where that year he was hired by loaner Everton Viña del Mar. On 18 February 2007, he played his 2nd game, scoring a goal against Audax Italiano.

The Catholic University celebrated the goal by making him have a bond with the institution; it made him remember what he wanted to return to at some point.

In mid-2007, Nico was signed by C. University, where he always had good relationships with his colleagues. In late 2008, he was transferred to U. Spanish. Nico is currently playing for CD Huachipato

== Managerial career ==
After working as the assistant coach of both Ariel Pereyra and Fernando Vergara, in March 2021 he became the manager of Magallanes in the Primera B de Chile.

Núñez led Magallanes to the top tier in 2022 as champions, and also won the Copa Chile with the side, qualifying them to the Copa Libertadores for the second time in their history. He also won the 2023 Supercopa de Chile with the club, before resigning on 13 May of that year.

In July 2023, Núñez signed with Universidad Católica, ending his contract in March 2024, after they were knocked out by Coquimbo Unido from the Copa Sudamericana.

== Honours ==
=== Player ===
Universidad Católica

- Primera División de Chile: 2005 Clausura

Huachipato

- Primera División de Chile: 2012 Clausura

=== Manager ===
Magallanes

- Primera B de Chile: 2022
- Copa Chile: 2022
- Supercopa de Chile: 2023
