= Marcelo Filla =

Chilean footballer

Personal information
- Full name: Marcelo Alejandro Filla Toro
- Date of birth: 14 February 1998 (age 28)
- Place of birth: Puente Alto, Santiago, Chile
- Height: 1.76 m (5 ft 9 in)
- Position: Right-back

Team information
- Current team: Deportes Copiapó
- Number: 20

Youth career
- Cobresal

Senior career*
Years	Team	Apps	(Gls)
2018–2024	Cobresal	36	(0)
2021–2023	→ Magallanes (loan)	63	(2)
2025–	Deportes Copiapó	14	(0)
- * Club domestic league appearances and goals as of 5 September 2025

Marcelo Alejandro Filla Toro (born 14 February 1998) is a Chilean footballer who plays as a right-back for Deportes Copiapó.

== Club career ==
Born in Puente Alto commune, Santiago de Chile, Filla is a product of Cobresal and made his professional debut in the 2018 Primera B, getting promotion to the 2019 Primera División.

In April 2021, Filla was loaned out to Magallanes, winning the 2022 Primera B, the 2022 Copa Chile and the 2023 Supercopa de Chile. He continued with them for the 2023 Primera División, and took part in both the 2023 Copa Libertadores and 2023 Copa Sudamericana.

Back to Cobresal in the second half of 2023, they were the Chilean top division runners-up and Filla took part in the 2024 Copa Libertadores.

In January 2025, Filla joined Deportes Copiapó.
