= Gastón Rodríguez =

Gastón Rodríguez may refer to:

- Gastón Rodríguez (swimmer) (born 1984), Argentine swimmer
- Gastón Rodríguez (footballer, born 1992) (born 1992), Uruguayan football forward
- Gastón Rodríguez (footballer, born 1994) (born 1994), Uruguayan football goalkeeper
