= 2023 Supercopa de Chile =

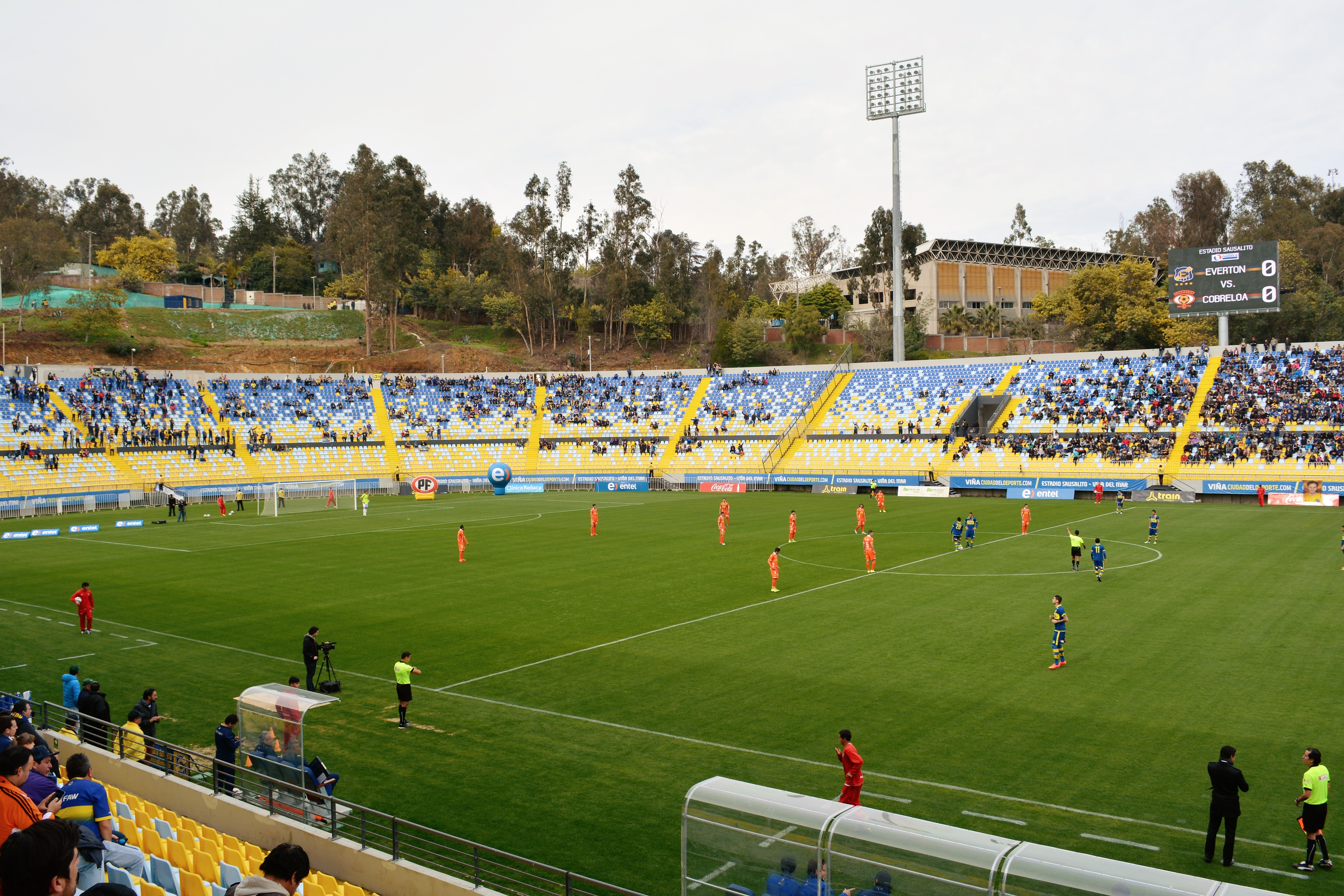
- Estadio Sausalito in Viña del Mar hosted the match
- Event: Supercopa Easy 2023
| Colo-Colo | Magallanes |
| 1 | 1 |
- Magallanes won 4–3 on penalties
- Date: 15 January 2023
- Venue: Estadio Sausalito, Viña del Mar
- Referee: Fernando Véjar
- Attendance: 15,435

The 2023 Supercopa de Chile (known as the Supercopa Easy 2023 for sponsorship purposes) was the eleventh edition of the Supercopa de Chile, competition organised by the Asociación Nacional de Fútbol Profesional (ANFP). The match was played by the 2022 Chilean Primera División champions Colo-Colo and the 2022 Copa Chile champions Magallanes on 15 January 2023 at Estadio Sausalito in Viña del Mar.

Magallanes won their first Supercopa title, beating Colo-Colo 4–3 on penalties after a 1–1 draw over 90 minutes.

== Teams ==
The two teams that contested the Supercopa are Colo-Colo, who qualified as 2022 Primera División champions and Magallanes, who qualified for the match as 2022 Copa Chile champions, defeating Unión Española in the final on penalty kicks after a 2–2 draw.

| Colo-Colo | Magallanes |
| 2022 Primera División champions | 2022 Copa Chile champions |

== Details ==
15 January 2023
19:00 UTC−3

| Colo-Colo | 1–1 | Magallanes |
|---|---|---|
| Bolados 22' | Report | Flores 26' |
Penalties
| Pavez (penalty missed); Benegas (penalty scored); Wiemberg (penalty scored); Thompson (penalty scored); Falcón (penalty missed) | 3–4 | (penalty scored) Cortés; (penalty scored) Villanueva; (penalty missed) Espinoza; (penalty scored) Acevedo; (penalty scored) Aránguiz |

Estadio Sausalito, Viña del Mar
Attendance: 15,435
Referee: Fernando Véjar

| Colo-Colo | Magallanes |

| GK | 1 | (Chile) Brayan Cortés | (yellow card) 71' |
| RB | 13 | (Chile) Bruno Gutiérrez |
| CB | 37 | (Uruguay) Maximiliano Falcón | (yellow card) 28' |
| CB | 23 | (Argentina) Ramiro González | (yellow card) 59' |
| LB | 21 | (Chile) Erick Wiemberg |
| RM | 6 | (Chile) César Fuentes | (substituted off) 72' |
| CM | 5 | (Argentina) Leonardo Gil | (yellow card) 90+1' (yellow-red card) 90+1' |
| LM | 8 | (Chile) Esteban Pavez (c) |
| RW | 10 | (New Zealand) Marco Rojas | (substituted off) 46' |
| LW | 18 | (Argentina) Agustín Bouzat | (substituted off) 72' |
| CF | 11 | (Chile) Marcos Bolados |
Substitutes:
| GK | 30 | (Chile) Fernando de Paul |
| DF | 2 | (Chile) Jeyson Rojas |
| DF | 3 | (Chile) Daniel Gutiérrez |
| DF | 4 | (Uruguay) Alan Saldivia |
| DF | 27 | (Chile) Pedro Navarro |
| MF | 26 | (Argentina) Matías Moya | (substituted on) 72' |
| MF | 28 | (Chile) Lucas Soto |
| MF | 43 | (Chile) Diego Plaza |
| FW | 7 | (Chile) Carlos Palacios |
| FW | 20 | (Chile) Alexander Oroz |
| FW | 22 | (Chile) Leandro Benegas | (substituted on) 46' |
| FW | 24 | (Chile) Jordhy Thompson | (substituted on) 72' |
Manager:
(Bolivia) Gustavo Quinteros

| GK | 1 | (Uruguay) Gastón Rodríguez |
| RB | 20 | (Chile) Marcelo Filla |
| CB | 19 | (Chile) Iván Vásquez | (substituted off) 34' |
| CB | 2 | (Argentina) Fernando Piñero |
| LB | 14 | (Chile) Felipe Espinoza |
| RM | 10 | (Chile) Tomás Aránguiz |
| CM | 27 | (Chile) Alfred Canales | (substituted off) 79' |
| LM | 13 | (Chile) César Cortés (c) |
| RW | 22 | (Chile) Thomas Jones | (substituted off) 65' |
| LW | 8 | (Chile) Manuel Vicuña | (substituted off) 79' |
| CF | 17 | (Chile) Felipe Flores | (yellow card) 28' | (substituted off) 79' |
Substitutes:
| GK | 30 | (Chile) Diego Tapia |
| DF | 3 | (Chile) Albert Acevedo | (substituted on) 34' |
| DF | 5 | (Chile) Christian Vilches |
| DF | 15 | (Chile) Nicolás Crovetto |
| DF | 29 | (Chile) Alonso Walters |
| MF | 6 | (Chile) Javier Quiroz | (substituted on) 79' |
| MF | 21 | (Chile) Carlos Villanueva | (substituted on) 79' | (yellow card) 88' |
| MF | 24 | (Chile) Andrés Souper |
| MF | 28 | (Chile) Alonso Barría |
| FW | 7 | (Chile) Julián Alfaro | (substituted on) 79' |
| FW | 11 | (Colombia) Yorman Zapata | (substituted on) 65' |
Manager:
(Chile) Nicolás Núñez

Assistant referees:
Carlos Poblete Roa
Claudio Urrutia
Fourth official:
José Cabero
Video assistant referee:
Benjamín Saravia
Assistant video assistant referees:
Héctor Jona
Leslie Vásquez

Match rules

- 90 minutes.
- Penalty shoot-out if scores still level.
- Twelve named substitutes.
- Maximum of five substitutions.
