= Albert Acevedo =

Chilean footballer (born 1983)

Albert Alejandro Acevedo Vergara
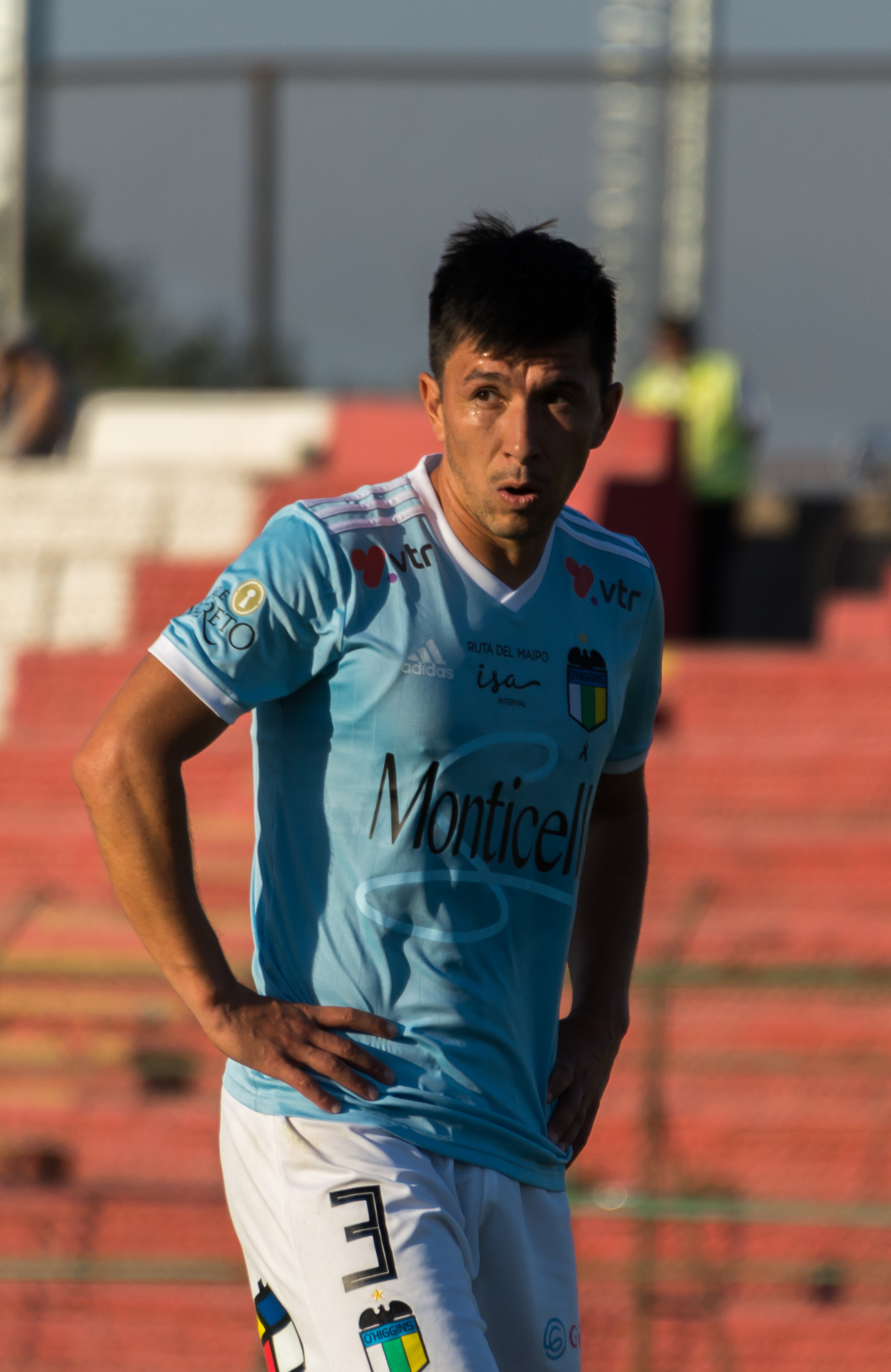
- Acevedo with O'Higgins in 2018

Personal information
- Full name: Albert Alejandro Acevedo Vergara
- Date of birth: May 6, 1983 (age 43)
- Place of birth: Conchalí, Santiago, Chile
- Height: 1.76 m (5 ft 9 in)
- Position: Defender

Team information
- Current team: O'Higgins (assistant)

Youth career
- Unión Española

Senior career*
Years	Team	Apps	(Gls)
2001	Unión Española	0	(0)
2002–2008	Universidad Católica	109	(10)
2006	→ Cobreloa (loan)	18	(0)
2009–2010	O'Higgins	61	(2)
2011–2013	Universidad de Chile	79	(4)
2014–2021	O'Higgins	194	(14)
2022–2023	Magallanes	40	(0)
Total		501	(30)

International career
2003	Chile U20	4	(0)
2009–2014	Chile	2	(0)

Managerial career
- 2024–: O'Higgins (assistant)
- * Club domestic league appearances and goals

Albert Alejandro Acevedo Vergara (born May 6, 1983) is a Chilean former footballer who played as a defender.

== Career ==
=== Universidad de Chile ===
In 2011, Acevedo joined Universidad de Chile.

=== O'Higgins ===
In 2014, he won the Supercopa de Chile against Deportes Iquique.

He participated with the club in the 2014 Copa Libertadores where they faced Deportivo Cali, Cerro Porteño and Lanús, being third and being eliminated in the group stage.

=== Magallanes ===
After spending two seasons with Magallanes and playing the 2023 Copa Chile final match, he retired from professional football.

== International career ==
As a youth, he participated for Chile in the South American U-20 Championship 2003.

== Personal life ==
Acevedo was born in Conchalí, Santiago.

He graduated as a football manager at INAF (National Football Institute), while playing for Magallanes, alongside his fellows César Cortés and Iván Vásquez.

== Post-retirement ==
Following his retirement, he assumed as the youth promotion manager of O'Higgins to support youth players joining the first team.

== Honours ==
Universidad Católica

- Primera División (2): 2002 Apertura, 2005 Clausura

Universidad de Chile

- Primera División (3): 2011 Apertura, 2011 Clausura, 2012 Apertura
- Copa Chile (1): 2012–13
- Copa Sudamericana (1): 2011

O'Higgins

- Supercopa de Chile (1): 2014

Magallanes

- Primera B (1): 2022
- Copa Chile (1): 2022
- Supercopa de Chile (1): 2023
