= Yorman Zapata =

Colombian footballer (born 2000)

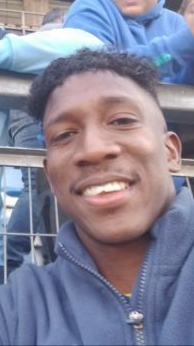
- Zapata in 2024.

Personal information
- Full name: Yorman Zapata Mina
- Date of birth: 1 September 2000 (age 26)
- Place of birth: El Charco, Colombia
- Height: 1.75 m (5 ft 9 in)
- Position: Winger

Team information
- Current team: Deportivo Moquegua

Youth career
- Deportivo Cali
- 2019: Universidad Católica

Senior career*
Years	Team	Apps	(Gls)
2019–2024	Magallanes	103	(21)
2024	Defensa y Justicia	1	(0)
2024–2025	O'Higgins	17	(0)
2025	Deportes Limache	20	(0)
2026–	Deportivo Moquegua	0	(0)
- * Club domestic league appearances and goals as of 5 January 2026

Yorman Zapata Mina (born 1 September 2000) is a Colombian footballer who plays as a winger for Peruvian club Deportivo Moquegua.

== Club career ==
=== Early career ===
Born in El Charco, Nariño, Zapata moved to Chile in 2019 and joined the youth sides of Universidad Católica, after the club bought his rights from a Deportivo Cali youth school; he later revealed that he did not play for América de Cali or Deportivo Cali themselves due to the lack of financial resources to pay for his transportations, and only came to Chile after a representative led him to the under-20 side of the UC.

=== Magallanes ===
In the middle of 2019, Zapata moved to Primera B side Magallanes, with Católica retaining 25% of his economic rights. He made his senior debut on 17 August of that year, coming on as a second-half substitute for Marcelo Allende in a 1–0 home loss to Unión San Felipe.

After appearing in just three matches in his first season, Zapata became a starter for Magallanes in the following years, scoring his first goal on 15 March 2020 in a 1–0 away win over Cobreloa. In the 2021 season, he was the club's top goalscorer with nine goals.

In 2022, Zapata helped Magallanes to win the 2022 Copa Chile, their first major trophy, and earn promotion to the Chilean top flight.

=== Deportes Limache ===
In July 2025, Zapata left O'Higgins and switched to Deportes Limache. He left them at the end of the year.

=== Deportivo Moquegua ===
In January 2026, Zapata moved to Peru and signed with Deportivo Moquegua.

== Personal life ==
Born in Colombia, Zapata stated a desire to represent the Chile national team in 2021, after stating that the country "opened the doors of football" for him.

== Career statistics ==
As of 1 October 2024

Appearances and goals by club, season and competition
Club	Division	League			Cup		Continental		Total	
Club	Division	Season	Apps	Goals	Apps	Goals	Apps	Goals	Apps	Goals
Magallanes	Primera B de Chile	2019	2	0	—		—		2	0
Magallanes	Primera B de Chile	2020	23	4	—		—		23	4
Magallanes	Primera B de Chile	2021	24	9	2	0	—		26	9
Magallanes	Primera B de Chile	2022	27	4	6	3	—		33	7
Magallanes	Chilean Primera División	2023	26	4	3	0	9	3	38	7
Magallanes	Total		102	21	11	3	9	3	122	27
Defensa y Justicia	Argentine Primera División	2024	0	0	1	0	5	1	6	1
O'Higgins	Chilean Primera División	2024	9	0	0	0	0	0	9	0
Career total			111	21	12	3	14	4	137	28

== Honours ==
Magallanes

- Primera B: 2022
- Copa Chile: 2022
- Supercopa de Chile: 2023
