= Algo habrán hecho =

Algo habrán hecho (Spanish: They must have done something) is an infamous Spanish popular quote, from the time of the Dirty war; it was used mostly as a kind of excuse made out by a portion of the population of Argentina, to avoid having to help the desaparecidos when they were arrested by the genocidal military dictatorship that ruled the country from 1976 to 1983.

It is also a short name for the documentaries:

- Algo habrán hecho por la historia argentina
- Algo habrán hecho por la historia de Chile
