= Yorman =

Yorman is a given name. Notable people with the given name include:

- Yorman Polas Bartolo (born 1985), Cuban-German basketball player
- Yorman Rodríguez (born 1992), Venezuelan former baseball outfielder
- Yorman Zapata (born 2000), Colombian footballer
