= Gastón Rodríguez (footballer, born 1994) =

Uruguayan footballer

Personal information
- Full name: Matías Gastón Rodríguez Olivera
- Date of birth: 12 February 1994 (age 32)
- Place of birth: Montevideo, Uruguay
- Height: 1.85 m (6 ft 1 in)
- Position: Goalkeeper

Team information
- Current team: Montevideo City Torque

Youth career
- Defensor Sporting

Senior career*
Years	Team	Apps	(Gls)
2013–2019	Defensor Sporting	21	(0)
2020	Deportes Valdivia	16	(0)
2021–2023	Magallanes	70	(0)
2024–2025	Rangers	42	(0)
2026–	Montevideo City Torque	0	(0)

International career
2011	Uruguay U17		
- * Club domestic league appearances and goals as of 23 January 2026

Matías Gastón Rodríguez Olivera (born 12 February 1994), known as Gastón Rodríguez, is an Uruguayan footballer who plays as a goalkeeper for Montevideo City Torque.

== Club career ==
A product of Defensor Sporting youth system, Rodríguez played for them until 2019, coinciding with well-known players such as Giorgian De Arrascaeta, Gastón Silva, among others.

In 2020, he moved to Chile and joined Deportes Valdivia in the Primera B. The next season, he switched to Magallanes. With them, he won three titles: the 2022 Primera B, the 2022 Copa Chile and the 2023 Supercopa de Chile.

In 2024, Rodríguez signed with Rangers de Talca. He left them at the end of the 2025 season.

Back to his homeland, Rodríguez joined Montevideo City Torque on 23 January 2026.

== International career ==
Rodríguez was part of the Uruguay under-17 squad during 2011, also in the 2011 World Cup.

== Personal life ==
He is married to a Chilean and they have two Chilean-born children.

In 2025, he started the process of getting the Chilean nationality by residence.

== Honours ==
Magallanes

- Primera B de Chile: 2022
- Copa Chile: 2022
- Supercopa de Chile: 2023
