= Gastón Rodríguez (footballer) =

Gastón Rodríguez (footballer) may refer to:

- Gastón Rodríguez (footballer, born 1992), Uruguayan football forward
- Gastón Rodríguez (footballer, born 1994), Uruguayan football goalkeeper
