= Manuel Vicuña =

Chilean footballer

Personal information
- Full name: Manuel Fernando Vicuña Martínez
- Date of birth: 31 October 1999 (age 26)
- Place of birth: El Quisco, Chile
- Height: 1.67 m (5 ft 6 in)
- Position: Winger

Team information
- Current team: Rangers

Youth career
- San Antonio Unido
- 2016–2018: Magallanes

Senior career*
Years	Team	Apps	(Gls)
2018–2025	Magallanes	101	(19)
2026–	Rangers	0	(0)
- * Club domestic league appearances and goals as of 23 December 2025

Manuel Fernando Vicuña Martínez (31 October 1999) is a Chilean footballer who plays as a winger for Rangers de Talca.

== Club career ==
A winger, Vicuña was with San Antonio Unido before joining the Magallanes under-17 team in 2016. He was promoted to the senior team one and half year later. A player during a successful stint of the club, he won the 2022 Primera B, the 2022 Copa Chile and the 2023 Supercopa de Chile. He continued with them for the 2023 Primera División and took part in the 2023 Copa Sudamericana. He left them at the end of the 2025 season.

Vicuña switched to Rangers de Talca in December 2025.
