= Thomas Jones (footballer, born 1997) =

Chilean footballer

Personal information
- Full name: Thomas Luciano Jones Mariani
- Date of birth: 25 September 1997 (age 29)
- Place of birth: Santiago, Chile
- Height: 1.71 m (5 ft 7 in)
- Position: Midfielder

Team information
- Current team: Deportes Iquique
- Number: 7

Youth career
- Universidad de Chile
- 2012–2015: Barnechea

Senior career*
Years	Team	Apps	(Gls)
2015–2016	Barnechea	2	(0)
2015–2016	→ Deportes Santa Cruz (loan)	24	(1)
2016–2017	Deportes Santa Cruz	44	(4)
2018–2024	Magallanes	139	(19)
2025	Deportes Copiapó	30	(13)
2026	Kaisar	15	(0)
2026–	Deportes Iquique	0	(0)

International career
2015–2016	Chile U20	1	(0)
- * Club domestic league appearances and goals as of 25 December 2025

Thomas Luciano Jones Mariani (Santiago September 25, 1997) is a Chilean footballer who plays as a midfielder for Deportes Iquique.

== Club career ==
Born in Santiago, Jones began his career in the academy of Universidad de Chile, where he stayed until an injury at under-13 level lead coaches to not register him for the next year. He returned to playing football in his local neighbourhood, before joining the academy of Barnechea at under-15 level.

Having made two appearances in the Copa Chile with Barnechea, Jones left early in the 2015–16 season, joining Segunda División side Santa Cruz, initially on loan.

After three seasons with Deportes Santa Cruz, Jones returned to the Primera B with Magallanes. Having suffered a wrist injury at the beginning of 2022, he missed two-and-a-half months, before returning to the side to help them win the Copa Chile, as well as promotion to the Chilean Primera División.

In 2025, Jones played for Deportes Copiapó.

After Deportes Copiapó, Jones moved abroad and signed with Kazakhstan Premier League club Kaisar. He moved back to Chile and joined Deportes Iquique on 29 June 2026.

== Career statistics ==
=== Club ===
As of 21 September 2023

Appearances and goals by club, season and competition
Club	Season	League			Copa Chile		Continental		Other		Total	
Club	Season	Division	Apps	Goals	Apps	Goals	Apps	Goals	Apps	Goals	Apps	Goals
Barnechea	2015–16	Primera B	2	0	2	0	–		0	0	4	0
Santa Cruz (loan)	2015–16	Segunda División	24	1	0	0	–		0	0	24	1
Santa Cruz	2016–17	Segunda División	28	2	0	0	–		0	0	28	2
Santa Cruz	2017	Segunda División	16	2	0	0	–		0	0	16	2
Santa Cruz	Total		68	5	0	0	0	0	0	0	68	5
Magallanes	2018	Primera B	19	3	4	0	–		0	0	23	3
Magallanes	2019	Primera B	11	3	3	1	–		0	0	14	4
Magallanes	2020	Primera B	24	5	0	0	–		0	0	24	5
Magallanes	2021	Primera B	21	1	4	0	–		0	0	25	1
Magallanes	2022	Primera B	19	5	6	0	–		0	0	25	5
Magallanes	2023	Chilean Primera División	17	1	3	2	7 (Note: Four appearances in the Copa Libertadores, three appearances in the Copa Sudamericana)	0	1 (Note: Appearances in the Supercopa de Chile)	0	28	3
Magallanes	Total		111	18	20	3	7	0	1	0	139	21
Career total			181	23	22	3	7	0	1	0	211	26
