= Ricardo Caldas =

Peruvian footballer (born 1981)

Personal information
- Full name: Luis Ricardo Caldas Morales
- Date of birth: 27 April 1981 (age 45)
- Place of birth: Lima, Peru
- Height: 1.80 m (5 ft 11 in)
- Position: Forward

Team information
- Current team: CD Moquegua (president)

Senior career*
Years	Team	Apps	(Gls)
1998	Deportivo Municipal		
1999	Sport Huamanga		
2000	Unión Huaral		
2001	CNI		
2002–2004	Universidad César Vallejo		
2005	FBC Melgar	23	(1)
2006	Unión Huaral	6	(0)
2007–2011	Universidad César Vallejo		
2011	Alianza Atlético		
2012	Sport Boys	17	(3)
2013	Inti Gas	19	(3)
2014	Willy Serrato	7	(0)
- * Club domestic league appearances and goals

Luis Ricardo Caldas Morales (born on 27 April 1981) is a Peruvian professional footballer who played as forward.

== Playing career ==
Having come from Deportivo Municipal, Caldas particularly distinguished himself at Universidad César Vallejo where he played from 2002 to 2004 and then from 2007 to 2011. There was the opportunity to win the Copa Perú in 2003, the 2nd division championship in 2007 while being crowned top scorer of the latter tournament with 13 goals.

== Career as a sports executive ==
After his playing career ended, Caldas remained at Universidad César Vallejo, where he became general manager. He was instrumental in bringing Paolo Guerrero to the club in 2024. In 2025, he was appointed president of Club Deportivo Moquegua.

== Personal live ==
Caldas is married to Kelly Acuña, the daughter of César Acuña, a Peruvian entrepreneur and politician.

== Honours ==
Universidad César Vallejo

- Peruvian Segunda División: 2007
- Peruvian Segunda División Top scorer: 2007 (13 goals)
- Copa Perú: 2003
