= César Cortés =

Chilean footballer (born 1984)

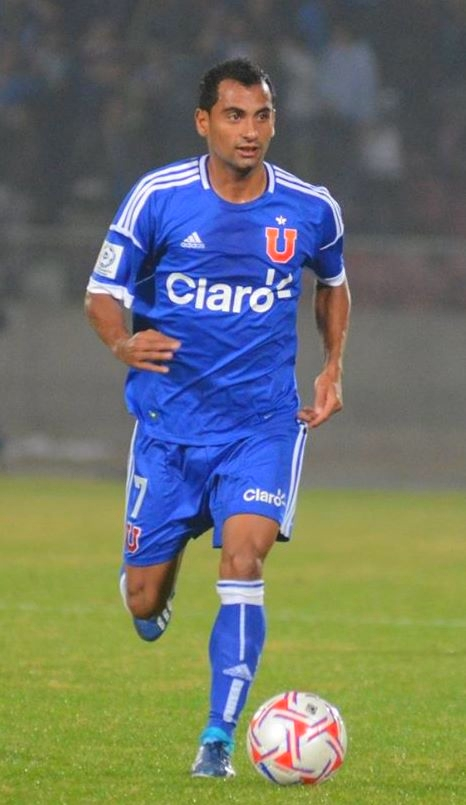
- Cortés with Universidad de Chile in 2013

Personal information
- Full name: César Alexis Cortés Pinto
- Date of birth: 9 January 1984 (age 42)
- Place of birth: La Serena, Chile
- Height: 1.75 m (5 ft 9 in)
- Position: Midfielder

Team information
- Current team: Chile (assistant coach)

Youth career
- Academia Santa Inés
- Universidad Católica

Senior career*
Years	Team	Apps	(Gls)
2003–2006	Universidad Católica	8	(1)
2004	→ Deportes Puerto Montt (loan)	36	(10)
2006	→ Deportes Puerto Montt (loan)	9	(2)
2006–2007	Albacete	6	(0)
2008–2009	Huachipato	72	(16)
2010	Everton	24	(5)
2010	→ Polonia Warsaw (loan)	4	(0)
2011–2012	Huachipato	72	(16)
2013–2015	Universidad de Chile	43	(4)
2015–2016	Palestino	33	(8)
2016–2017	Audax Italiano	17	(2)
2017	Santiago Wanderers	13	(3)
2018–2021	Palestino	102	(4)
2022–2023	Magallanes	35	(12)
Total		474	(83)

International career
2012–2013	Chile	4	(0)

Managerial career
- 2025–: CDI Ibiza (youth)
- 2026–: Chile (assistant)
- * Club domestic league appearances and goals

César Alexis Cortés Pinto (born 9 January 1984) is a Chilean former professional footballer who played as a midfielder.

== International career ==
Cortés made four appearances for the Chile national team between 2012 and 2013.

== Coaching career ==
Cortés graduated as a Football Manager at INAF (National Football Institute) in August 2022, while playing for Magallanes, alongside his fellows Albert Acevedo and Iván Vásquez.

Settled in Ibiza, Cortés has coached youth teams of CDI Ibiza. In March 2026, he was included as an assistant coach for the Chile national team in the context of the 2026 FIFA Series matches against Cape Verde and New Zealand in Auckland. He rejoined them for the friendly matches in June 2026.

== Personal life ==
Following his retirement, Cortés settled in Ibiza, Spain, the hometown of his wife.

== Career statistics ==
As of match played on 17 February 2018

Appearances and goals by club, season and competition
Club	Season	League			Cup		Other		Total	
Club	Season	Division	Apps	Goals	Apps	Goals	Apps	Goals	Apps	Goals
Huachipato	2009	Primera División of Chile	33	7	0	0	0	0	33	7
Total			33	7	0	0	0	0	33	7
Everton	2010	Primera Division of Chile	24	5	0	0	0	0	24	5
Total			24	5	0	0	0	0	24	5
Polonia Warsaw (loan)	2009–10	Ekstraklasa	4	0	0	0	0	0	4	0
Total			4	0	0	0	0	0	4	0
Huachipato	2011	Primera División of Chile	34	7	2	4	0	0	36	11
Huachipato	2012	Primera División of Chile	38	9	5	2	0	0	43	11
Total			72	16	7	6	0	0	79	22
Universidad de Chile	2013	Primera División of Chile	13	3	3	2	9 (Note: Five appearances in Copa Libertadores, Three appearances in Copa Sudamericana, One appearance in Supercopa de Chile)	1	25	6
Universidad de Chile	2013–14	Primera División of Chile	15	0	5	0	2 (Note: Appearances in Copa Libertadores)	0	22	0
Universidad de Chile	2014–15	Primera División of Chile	15	1	3	1	4	0	22	2
Total			43	4	11	3	15	1	69	8
Palestino	2015–16	Primera División of Chile	33	8	4	0	0	0	37	8
Total			33	8	4	0	0	0	37	8
Audax Italiano	2016–17	Chilean Primera División	17	2	3	0	0	0	20	2
Total			17	2	3	0	0	0	20	2
Santiago Wanderers	2017	Chilean Primera División	13	3	9	0	2 (Note: Appearances in Promotion/relegation play-offs)	0	24	3
Total			13	3	9	0	2	0	24	3
Palestino (loan)	2018	Chilean Primera División	25	0	10	2	0	0	35	2
Total			25	0	10	2	0	0	35	2
Career totals			264	45	44	11	17	1	325	57

== Honours ==
Universidad Católica

- Primera División de Chile: 2005 Clausura

Huachipato

- Primera División de Chile: 2012 Clausura

Universidad de Chile

- Primera División de Chile: 2014–15 Apertura
- Copa Chile: 2012–13

Santiago Wanderers

- Copa Chile: 2017

Palestino

- Copa Chile: 2018

Magallanes

- Primera B de Chile: 2022
- Copa Chile: 2022
- Supercopa de Chile: 2023
