= Algo habrán hecho por la historia de Chile =

- Cover of the DVD edition
- Genre: Documentary
- Starring: Manuel Vicuña; Francisco Melo
- Country of origin: Chile
- Original language: Spanish
- No. of seasons: 1
- No. of episodes: 8

Original release
- Network: Televisión Nacional de Chile
- Release: July 8 – September 10, 2010

Algo habrán hecho por la historia de Chile (Spanish: They sure did something for the history of Chile) is a documentary television miniseries that narrates the history of Chile. It has the format of the Argentine documentary film Algo habrán hecho por la historia argentina, and it was aired by Televisión Nacional de Chile as part of the Bicentennial of Chile celebrations. The documentary is hosted by historian Manuel Vicuña and the actor Francisco Melo, reprising the roles of Felipe Pigna and Mario Pergolini in the Argentine documentary. The documentary was based on investigations by Andrea Larroucau, Juan Carlos Arellano, Jorge Martin, Carolina Odone and María José Schneuer, and the support of Hernán Rodríguez, Alejandra Araya and Fernando Purcell.

The documentary narrates the history of Chile, from the Spanish colonization by Pedro de Valdivia and the begin of the Arauco War, to the Centennial of Chile in 1910. In the interim, the documentary deals with the Chilean War of Independence, the Chilean civil wars, the War of the Confederation, the War of the Pacific, among others.

The documentary uses two main styles, jumping from one to the other. One style is the use of actors to represent certain key events. The second style is the plain explanation of the things taking place, which could be done with visual gags, with the hosts in some modern day location, or at a representation of an event. The use of jokes or visual gags, however, is very limited, and the documentary does not have the humoristic tone of the Argentine one; and the acted passages are longer and more detailed.

== Cast ==
- Álvaro Espinoza as Pedro de Valdivia
- Trinidad González as Inés Suárez
- Ariel Mateluna as Lautaro
- Bárbara Ríos as Isabel Vivar
- Leonardo Ñancupil as Curivilu
- Andrés Reyes as Núñez de Pineda
- Diego Ruiz as Alejo
- Bregoña Basauri as Catalina de los Ríos
- Francisca Walker as Úrsula Suárez

== See also ==
- History of Chile
