= Gonzalo Espinoza =

Chilean footballer (born 1990)

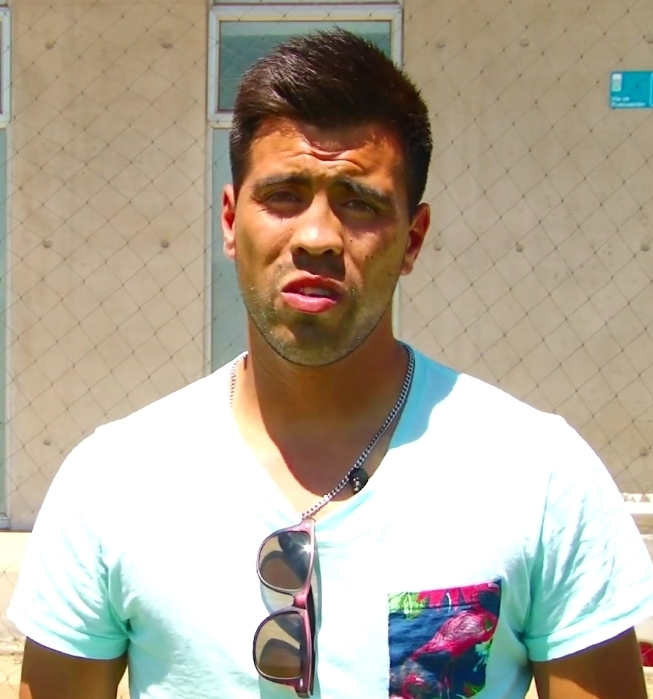
- Espinoza in 2014

Personal information
- Full name: Gonzalo Alejandro Espinoza Toledo
- Date of birth: 9 April 1990 (age 36)
- Place of birth: Constitución, Chile
- Height: 1.78 m (5 ft 10 in)
- Position: Midfielder

Team information
- Current team: Constitución Unido

Youth career
- 2007–2009: Huachipato

Senior career*
Years	Team	Apps	(Gls)
2010	Barnechea	–	(–)
2011–2013	Unión San Felipe	18	(1)
2011	→ Racing Club (loan)	5	(0)
2012–2013	→ Arsenal de Sarandí (loan)	13	(0)
2013–2014	All Boys	26	(3)
2014–2017	Universidad de Chile	57	(2)
2016	→ Patronato (loan)	12	(0)
2017–2018	Kayserispor	13	(0)
2018–2021	Universidad de Chile	51	(8)
2022	Unión Española	23	(0)
2023	Unión San Felipe	28	(2)
2024	Deportes Antofagasta	27	(2)
2025	Deportes Recoleta	16	(0)
2026–	Constitución Unido	0	(–)

International career^{‡}
2015	Chile	1	(0)
- * Club domestic league appearances and goals as of 14 January 2026 ‡ National team caps and goals as of 29 January 2015

Gonzalo Alejandro Espinoza Toledo (Note: In this Spanish name, the first or paternal surname is Espinoza and the second or maternal family name is Toledo.) (born 9 April 1990), known as Gonzalo Espinoza, is a Chilean footballer who plays as a midfielder for Constitución Unido.

== Career ==
In 2025, Espinoza signed with Deportes Recoleta from Deportes Antofagasta.

In February 2026, Espinoza joined his hometown's club, Constitución Unido, in the Chilean Tercera A.

== Career statistics ==
As of match played on 11 March 2018

Appearances and goals by club, season and competition
Club	Season	League			Cup		League Cup		Other		Total	
Club	Season	Division	Apps	Goals	Apps	Goals	Apps	Goals	Apps	Goals	Apps	Goals
Unión San Felipe	2011	Primera División of Chile	18	1	5	0	—				23	1
Racing Club (loan)	2011–12	Argentine Primera División	5	0	1	0	—				6	0
Arsenal (loan)	2012–13	Argentine Primera División	13	0	1	0	—		6	0	20	0
All Boys	2013–14	Argentine Primera División	26	3	1	0	—				27	3
Universidad de Chile	2014–15	Primera División of Chile	25	1	0	0	—		5	0	30	1
Universidad de Chile	2015–16	Primera División of Chile	20	0	7	0	—		1	0	28	0
Universidad de Chile	2016–17	Chilean Primera División	12	1	0	0	—		2	0	14	1
Universidad de Chile	Total		57	2	7	0	0	0	8	0	72	2
Patronato (loan)	2016–17	Argentine Primera División	12	0	0	0	—				12	0
Kayserispor	2017–18	Süper Lig	12	0	8	0	—				20	0
Career totals			143	6	23	0	0	0	14	0	180	6

== International career ==
He got his first call up to the senior Chile squad for a friendly against the United States in January 2015 and made his international debut in the match.
