= Marco Collao =

Chilean footballer (born 1998)

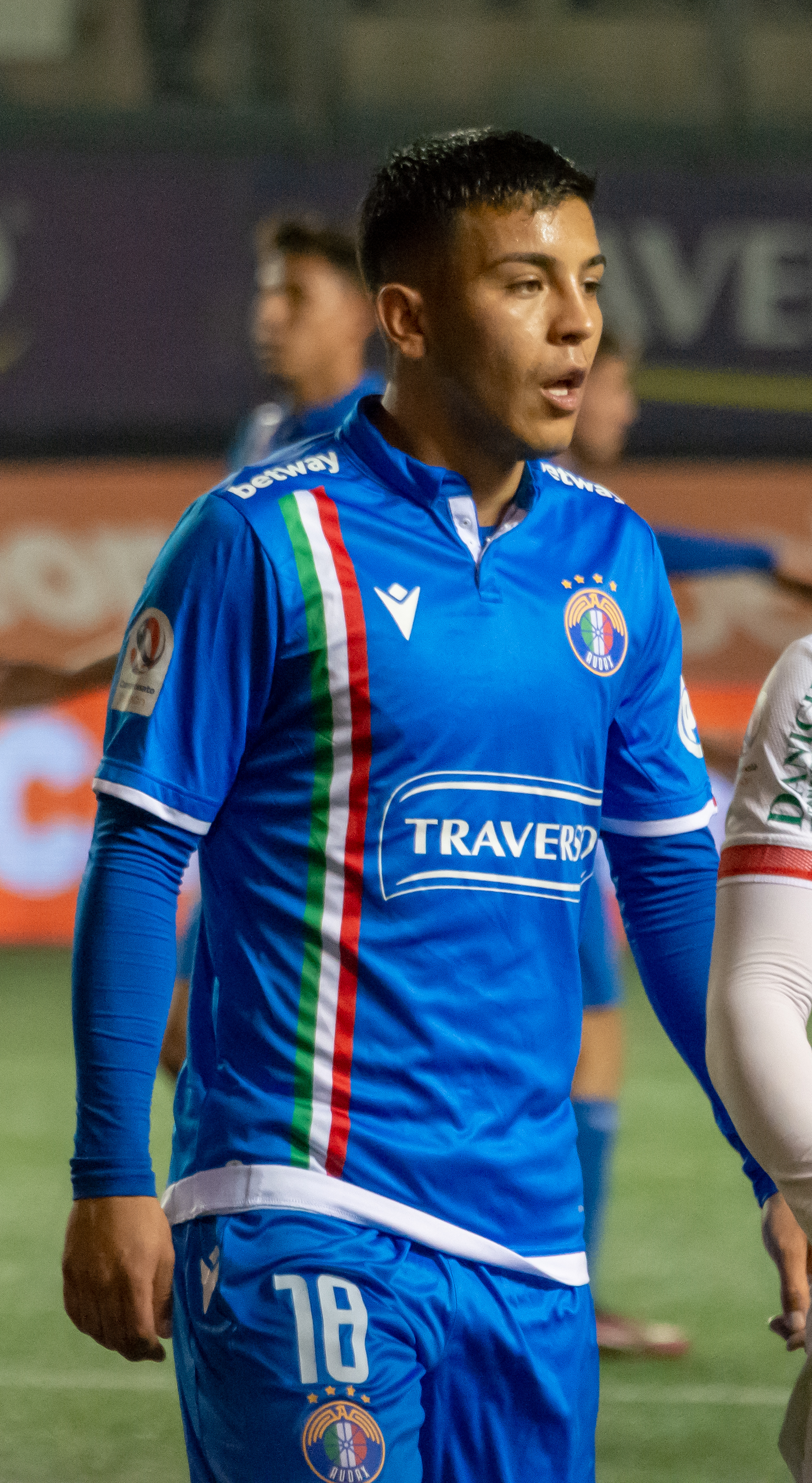
- Collao with Audax Italiano in 2023

Personal information
- Full name: Marco Antonio Collao Ramos
- Date of birth: 11 April 1998 (age 28)
- Place of birth: Calama, Chile
- Height: 1.73 m (5 ft 8 in)
- Position: Midfielder

Team information
- Current team: Audax Italiano
- Number: 8

Youth career
- 2013–2016: Coquimbo Unido

Senior career*
Years	Team	Apps	(Gls)
2016–2018	Coquimbo Unido	36	(5)
2018–2022	Deportes Antofagasta	105	(2)
2023–	Audax Italiano	76	(3)
- * Club domestic league appearances and goals as of 7 February 2026

Marco Antonio Collao Ramos (born 11 April 1998) is a Chilean footballer who plays as a midfielder for Audax Italiano.

== Career ==
Born in Calama, Chile, Collao trialed with local club Cobreloa before starting his career at the age of 15 with Coquimbo Unido. Collao has stated that his role model is Charles Aránguiz.
