= Federico Castro =

Argentine footballer

Personal information
- Full name: Federico Gastón Castro
- Date of birth: 28 August 1992 (age 34)
- Place of birth: Buenos Aires, Argentina
- Height: 1.83 m (6 ft 0 in)
- Position: Forward

Team information
- Current team: Atlanta

Youth career
- Defensa y Justicia

Senior career*
Years	Team	Apps	(Gls)
2012	Deportivo Maipú	1	(0)
2012–2013	Cambaceres	20	(0)
2014	Defensores de Belgrano	13	(5)
2015–2016	Sarmiento	4	(0)
2016	→ Santamarina (loan)	19	(2)
2016–2018	Defensores de Belgrano	54	(13)
2018–2019	Independiente Rivadavia	27	(7)
2019	Palestino	6	(1)
2020	Curicó Unido	30	(10)
2021	Sol de América	10	(0)
2022–2023	Curicó Unido	50	(11)
2024–2025	Independiente Rivadavia	8	(2)
2025–2026	Patronato	33	(7)
2026–	Atlanta	7	(0)
- * Club domestic league appearances and goals as of 16:39, 24 April 2026 (UTC)

Federico Gastón Castro (born 28 August 1992) is an Argentine professional footballer who plays as a forward for Atlanta.

== Career ==
Castro started in Defensa y Justicia's youth, before moving to Deportivo Maipú who selected him for his senior bow on 21 October 2012 in a 4–1 victory over Juventud Unida Universitario. Months later, Castro went across Torneo Federal A to Cambaceres. Twenty appearances followed. A move to fellow third tier outfit Defensores de Belgrano was completed on 30 June 2014. He scored on his club debut, netting a winner over Alvarado on the way to five overall goals; including a brace over Talleres. In January 2015, Castro joined Primera División's Sarmiento. His pro league bow came months later versus Arsenal de Sarandí.

Having featured four times in the 2015 campaign for Sarmiento, they loaned him out in early 2016 to Santamarina of Primera B Nacional. He subsequently scored in matches against Instituto and Gimnasia y Esgrima as they finished thirteenth. Defensores de Belgrano resigned Castro ahead of the 2016–17 Torneo Federal A. Fifty-six fixtures and fourteen goals occurred across two seasons with them. On 30 June 2018, Castro signed with Independiente Rivadavia in Primera B Nacional. Twenty-seven total appearances and seven goals occurred, including two in the end of season promotion play-offs versus Nueva Chicago.

In July 2019, Castro went abroad after agreeing terms with Chilean Primera División side Palestino.

== Career statistics ==
As of 8 August 2019.

Club statistics
Club	Season	League			Cup		League Cup		Continental		Other		Total	
Club	Season	Division	Apps	Goals	Apps	Goals	Apps	Goals	Apps	Goals	Apps	Goals	Apps	Goals
Deportivo Maipú	2011–12	Torneo Argentino A	1	0	0	0	—		—		0	0	1	0
Cambaceres	2012–13	Primera C Metropolitana	20	0	0	0	—		—		0	0	20	0
Defensores de Belgrano	2014	Torneo Federal A	13	5	3	2	—		—		0	0	16	7
Sarmiento	2015	Primera División	4	0	0	0	—		—		0	0	4	0
Sarmiento	2016	Primera División	0	0	0	0	—		—		0	0	0	0
Sarmiento	Total		4	0	0	0	—		—		0	0	4	0
Santamarina (loan)	2016	Primera B Nacional	19	2	0	0	—		—		0	0	19	2
Defensores de Belgrano	2016–17	Torneo Federal A	21	5	1	1	—		—		4 (Note: Appearance(s) in the Torneo Federal A play-offs)	1	26	7
Defensores de Belgrano	2017–18	Torneo Federal A	24	6	1	0	—		—		5	1	30	7
Defensores de Belgrano	Total		45	11	2	1	—		—		9	2	56	14
Independiente Rivadavia	2018–19	Primera B Nacional	23	5	1	0	—		—		4 (Note: Appearance(s) in the Primera B Nacional play-offs)	2	28	7
Palestino	2019	Primera División	0	0	0	0	—		—		0	0	0	0
Career total			125	23	6	3	—		—		13	4	144	30
