= Leandro Garate =

Argentine footballer (born 1993)

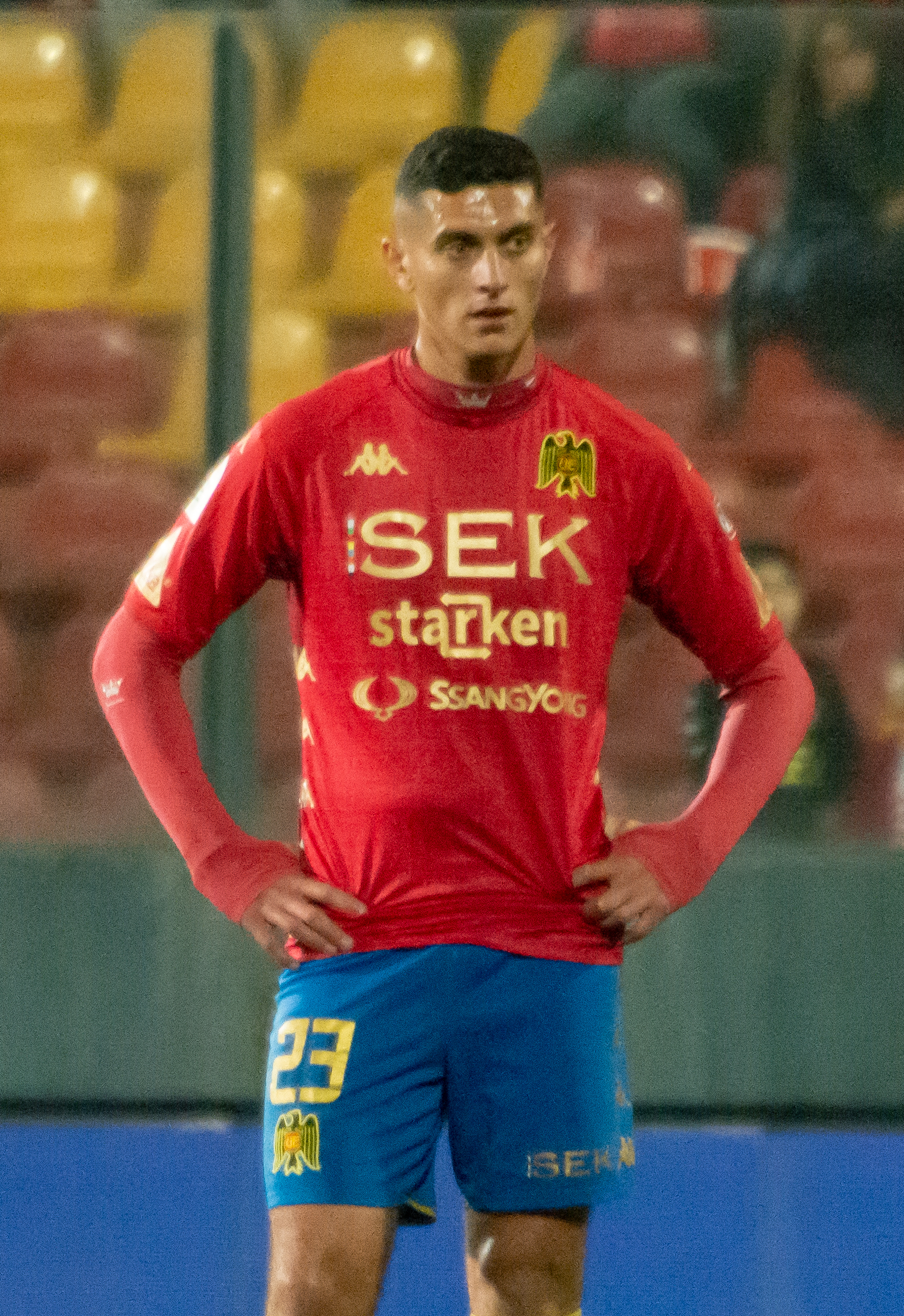

Personal information
- Full name: Leandro Julián Garate
- Date of birth: 2 September 1993 (age 33)
- Place of birth: Villa Constitución, Argentina
- Height: 1.90 m (6 ft 3 in)
- Position: Centre-forward

Team information
- Current team: AEL (on loan from Huracán)
- Number: 23

Youth career
- River Plate

Senior career*
Years	Team	Apps	(Gls)
2013–2016	Tigre	15	(2)
2016	Sandefjord	0	(0)
2017	Deportivo Rincón	20	(8)
2018–2019	Brown de Adrogué	26	(3)
2019	→ Arsenal de Sarandí (loan)	11	(4)
2019–2021	Barnechea	38	(17)
2021	Coquimbo Unido	30	(12)
2022–2023	Unión Española	57	(24)
2024–	Huracán	14	(1)
2024–2025	→ Banfield (loan)	13	(2)
2025–	→ AEL (loan)	29	(4)
- * Club domestic league appearances and goals as of 14 June 2026

Leandro Julián Garate (born 2 September 1993) is an Argentine professional footballer who plays as a centre-forward for Greek Super League club AEL, on loan from Huracán.

== Career ==
Garate was a part of River Plate's youth system, notably playing for the U20s at the 2012 U-20 Copa Libertadores in Peru; which the club won. Garate began playing for Tigre in the 2013–14 Argentine Primera División season, making his senior debut on 18 November 2013 during a 2–1 win over Newell's Old Boys. In the following 2014 campaign, Garate scored goals against Godoy Cruz and Lanús as Tigre qualified for the 2015 Copa Sudamericana. In August 2016, Garate joined 1. divisjon side Sandefjord. He departed five months later having not featured, though he was an unused substitute for a fixture with Bryne.

2017 saw Garate switch Norway for Argentina as he agreed to sign for Deportivo Rincón of Torneo Federal B. Eight goals in twenty fixtures followed. Primera B Nacional's Brown completed the signing of Garate in January 2018. His first appearance arrived on 3 February versus Deportivo Morón, which preceded his first goal for them a week later against Atlético de Rafaela. Garate was loaned to Arsenal de Sarandí in January 2019. He scored five goals in twelve matches for them, including the winning strike in the championship play-off against Sarmiento; which secured Arsenal promotion and the title.

July 2019 saw Garate leave Arsenal, and subsequently Brown, to move to Chile with Barnechea of Primera B. He scored twice on his first home start against Deportes Copiapó on 16 August, which preceded a goal against San Luis and a brace versus Rangers across eleven appearances in his first five months. On 2021 season, he joined club Coquimbo Unido.

== Career statistics ==
As of 24 December 2020.

Club statistics
Club	Season	League			Cup		League Cup		Continental		Other		Total	
Club	Season	Division	Apps	Goals	Apps	Goals	Apps	Goals	Apps	Goals	Apps	Goals	Apps	Goals
Tigre	2013–14	Primera División	1	0	0	0	—		—		0	0	1	0
Tigre	2014	Primera División	7	2	1	0	—		—		0	0	8	2
Tigre	2015	Primera División	7	0	1	0	—		1 (Note: Appearance(s) in the Copa Sudamericana)	0	1 (Note: Appearance(s) in the Primera División play-offs)	0	10	0
Tigre	Total		15	2	2	0	—		1	0	1	0	19	2
Sandefjord	2016	1. divisjon	0	0	0	0	—		—		0	0	0	0
Deportivo Rincón	2017	Torneo Federal B	20	8	0	0	—		—		0	0	20	8
Brown	2017–18	Primera B Nacional	13	2	0	0	—		—		3 (Note: Appearance(s) in the Primera B Nacional play-offs)	1	16	3
Brown	2018–19	Primera B Nacional	13	1	3	0	—		—		0	0	16	1
Brown	Total		26	3	3	0	—		—		3	1	32	4
Arsenal de Sarandí (loan)	2018–19	Primera B Nacional	11	4	1	0	—		—		1	1	13	5
Barnechea	2019	Primera B	11	5	0	0	—		—		0	0	11	5
Barnechea	2020	Primera B	27	12	—		—		—		0	0	23	11
Barnechea	Total		38	17	0	0	—		—		0	0	38	17
Coquimbo Unido	2021	Primera B	0	0	0	0	—		—		0	0	0	0
Career total			110	34	6	0	—		1	0	5	2	122	36

== Honours ==
River Plate

- U-20 Copa Libertadores: 2012

Arsenal de Sarandí

- Primera B Nacional: 2018–19

Coquimbo Unido

- Primera B de Chile: 2021
