= Nicolás Baeza =

Chilean footballer (born 1997)

Personal information
- Full name: Nicolás Eduardo Baeza Martínez
- Date of birth: 7 May 1997 (age 29)
- Place of birth: Concepción, Chile
- Height: 1.75 m (5 ft 9 in)
- Positions: Full-back; wide midfielder; winger

Team information
- Current team: Everton

Youth career
- 2007–2017: Huachipato

Senior career*
| Years | Team | Apps | (Gls) |
| 2017–2023 | Huachipato | 110 | (3) |
| 2020–2021 | → Deportes La Serena (loan) | 34 | (1) |
| 2024– | Everton | 0 | (0) |
- * Club domestic league appearances and goals as of 21 December 2023

Nicolás Eduardo Baeza Martínez (born 7 May 1997) is a Chilean footballer who plays for Everton as a left-back. A versatile player, he also plays as a wide midfielder or as a winger.

== Career ==
Baeza has spent the most part of his career with Huachipato, ending his contract in December 2023.

== Career statistics ==
As of 5 December 2021.

Appearances and goals by club, season and competition
| Club | Division | League | | | Cup | | Continental | | Total | |
| Club | Division | Season | Apps | Goals | Apps | Goals | Apps | Goals | Apps | Goals |
|---|---|---|---|---|---|---|---|---|---|---|
| Huachipato | Chilean Primera División | 2017 | 2 | 0 | — | | — | | 2 | 0 |
| Huachipato | Chilean Primera División | 2018 | 17 | 0 | 5 | 0 | — | | 22 | 0 |
| Huachipato | Chilean Primera División | 2019 | 24 | 1 | 2 | 0 | — | | 26 | 1 |
| Deportes La Serena | Primera B de Chile | 2020 | 34 | 1 | — | | — | | 34 | 1 |
| Huachipato | Chilean Primera División | 2021 | 22 | 1 | 8 | 0 | 7 | 0 | 37 | 1 |
| Huachipato | Chilean Primera División | 2022 | 0 | 0 | 0 | 0 | — | | 0 | 0 |
| Huachipato | Chilean Primera División | 2023 | 0 | 0 | 0 | 0 | — | | 0 | 0 |
| Huachipato | Total | | 65 | 2 | 15 | 0 | 7 | 0 | 87 | 2 |
| Everton | Chilean Primera División | 2024 | 0 | 0 | 0 | 0 | — | | 0 | 0 |
| Career total | | | 99 | 3 | 15 | 0 | 7 | 0 | 121 | 3 |

== Honours ==
Huachipato

- Primera División: 2023
