= Camilo Gaínza =

Chilean footballer (born 1993)

Camilo Gainza
Personal information
- Full name: Camilo Andrés Gainza Bernal
- Date of birth: 9 May 1993 (age 33)
- Place of birth: Santiago, Chile
- Height: 1.70 m (5 ft 7 in)
- Position: Midfielder

Youth career
- 2004–2006: Cobreloa
- 2007–2013: Universidad Católica

Senior career*
Years	Team	Apps	(Gls)
2011–2015	Universidad Católica	0	(0)
2014–2015	→ Curicó Unido (loan)	12	(0)
2015–2016	Deportes Concepción	8	(0)
2016–2017	Deportes Pintana	26	(8)
2017	Barnechea	15	(5)
2018–2019	Deportes Iquique	17	(1)
2018	→ Deportes La Serena (loan)	12	(1)
2020–2021	Barnechea	23	(1)
2021	Santiago Morning	22	(0)
2022	Magallanes	11	(1)
2023	Iberia	20	(1)
- * Club domestic league appearances and goals

Camilo Andrés Gainza Bernal (born 9 May 1993) is a Chilean former footballer who played as a midfielder.

== Club career ==
Gaínza was with Cobreloa before joining the Universidad Católica youth ranks at the age of 14. He made his professional debut was in Curicó Unido.

His last club was Iberia in the 2023 Segunda División Profesional.

== Post-retirement ==
Following his retirement, Gaínza began to work as a coach for football academies and later he started an academy for adults.
