= Lucas Soto =

Chilean footballer (born 2003)

Personal information
- Full name: Lucas Sebastián Soto Olivares
- Date of birth: 24 February 2003 (age 23)
- Place of birth: Quillota, Chile
- Height: 1.80 m (5 ft 11 in)
- Position: Midfielder

Team information
- Current team: Everton (on loan from Colo-Colo)

Youth career
- Colo-Colo

Senior career*
Years	Team	Apps	(Gls)
2021–	Colo-Colo	14	(0)
2025–	→ Everton (loan)	20	(0)

International career
2021	Chile U20	3	(0)
- * Club domestic league appearances and goals as of 14 December 2025

Lucas Sebastián Soto Olivares (born 24 February 2003) is a Chilean footballer who plays as a midfielder for Everton de Viña del Mar on loan from Colo-Colo.

== Club career ==
Born in Quillota, Chile, Soto is a product of Colo-Colo. He made his senior debut in the 5–1 away loss against Ñublense for the Chilean Primera División on 2 May 2021 and signed his first professional contract on 23 November of the same year. In 2023, he entered in the Copa Libertadores match against Boca Juniors on 4 May.

In February 2025, Soto was loaned out to Everton de Viña del Mar for a season and took part in the 2025 Copa Sudamericana.

== International career ==
In October 2021, Soto served as a sparring for the Chile senior team. In December of the same year, he represented Chile at under-20 level in the Copa Raúl Coloma Rivas, an international tournament in La Calera, Chile.
