= San Bernardo Unido =

- Full name: Club Deportivo San Bernardo Unido
- Nickname(s): SBU (S-B-U); Lobos (Wolves); Auriazules (Golden-Blue)
- Founded: October 25, 2011
- Ground: Luis Navarro Avilés; San Bernardo, Chile
- Capacity: 3 500 spectators
- Chairman: Patricio Jara
- Coach: Felipe Cataldo
- League: Tercera División B
- 2024: TBA
Home colours	Away colours

Club Deportivo San Bernardo Unido is a Chilean football club based in San Bernardo. They currently play at the fifth level of Chilean football, the Tercera División B.

The club was founded on October 25, 2011 and participated for five years in Tercera División B of Chile.

Its traditional rival is Lautaro de Buin. They contest the Clásico de la Provincia de Maipo.

== History ==
It was founded on October 25, 2011, as Club Deportivo San Bernardo Unido, under the aegis of the San Bernardo Football Association and the municipality.

In 2012, he sent a nomination to the National Soccer Association of Chile, which is accepted, joining that same year to the tournament of Fourth Division of Chile, as it was known at that time. In that tournament, the San Bernardo Unido Sports Club makes a remarkable campaign, which highlights the paths won by Deportes Cerro Navia by 9 to 0 and 7 to 0, which would be awarded his group with 36 points, qualifying to the final quadrangular. In the final instance of this championship was to face Defensor Casablanca, Pudahuel Barrancas, Ferroviarios, to obtain one of the quotas for direct promotion to the Third Division of Chile, unfortunately the club that had received 3 bonus points for leaving first in their group I finish last with 6 points.

In 2013, the club is located in the Metropolitan Group of the Transition Tournament, where he had a lean performance where he finished last of the group with 6 points. In that same year he played in the Clausura Tournament, in which San Bernardo Unido finished in fifth place with 17 points, where Mairon Lobos stands out, who finished seventh in the Top 10 scorers with 6 goals.

For 2014, San Bernardo Unido stayed in the South Zone, where the clashes with Deportes Provincial Osorno stand out, in which I finish last with 10 points, having to play the Liguilla de Permanencia. In that instance, the end was dramatic, in which San Bernardo Unido arrived at the bottom of the table to the last confrontation, where he faced in the Municipal Stadium of San Bernardo Juventud Puente Alto, with whom he disputed the permanence, the party ended 6 to 2, in favor of San Bernardo Unido, that result made it difficult for him to return to his Association of Origin. I finish finally second of that phase with 7 points and determining the descent of Juventud Puente Alto, for that season.

In 2015, San Bernardo Unido debuted in a new tournament organized by the National Football Association of Chile, which was named as Absolute Cup, where it was made up of Real San Joaquín, Ferro Estación Lampa and Pudahuel Barrancas, ending with 0 points in this group. The club returned to have a bad campaign in the League, where it had many complications and bad results, except that it gave the surprise with a victory in Los Lirios in front of Deportes Tocopilla in which it was leader and undefeated in that tournament, but finally it came to the last date I face to Enfoque de Rancagua, where for the aspirations of San Bernardo Unido I achieve the triumph by 1 to 0 of quality of visit, finishing eighth with 17 units.

In 2016, San Bernardo Unido began its participation in the second edition of the Absolute Cup, where he stayed with Gasparín FC, Provincial Talagante, Pirque Sports and Luis Matte Larraín, finishing with 3 points in his group. In the second half of the year he had a great performance in the tournament, starting with a 1 to 0 victory at Enfoque de Rancagua, giving the blow to defeat and take the undefeated Municipal Santiago by 2 to 0 in local condition, the club had an intense fight in the championship, where I achieve important results, defeating Buenos Aires de Parral by 4 to 1, and Deportes Tomé by 3 to 0, reaching the last date with options to access the next round, in which I faced Sports Pirque, duel that would end 2 to 1 in favor of the picture that represents the working-class neighborhood of Santiago de Chile, result that would not serve as Sports Tomé managed to defeat Deportivo La Granja by 5 to 3, and after equaling 46 points both casts, the table of the eighth region agreed by goal difference (+23 for Sports Tome and +11 for San Bernardo Unido).

In 2017, San Bernardo Unido began its participation with several victories, then had a negative streak, which made it be the protagonist of the bottom of the table, finishing penultimate with 17 points, only beating Pirque Sports, who would descend, in the Center Group.

== Coach ==
- (Chile) José Miguel González (2012-2013)
- (Chile) Juan Pablo Bravo (2013-2014)
- (Chile) Miguel Ángel Castillo (2015-2017)
- (Chile) José Miguel González (2018)
- (Chile) Nelson Cossio (2018)
- (Chile) Francisco Carillo (2019)
- (Chile) Raúl Puelle (2022-2023)
- (Chile) Claudio Aros (2023-2024)
- (Chile) Felipe Cataldo (2024-present)

== Seasons ==
- 9 seasons in Tercera División B (2012–2019; 2023–)
- 1 seasons in Copa Chile (2022)

== Players ==
Note: Flags indicate national team as defined under FIFA eligibility rules; some limited exceptions apply. Players may hold more than one non-FIFA nationality.

No.	Pos.	Nation	Player
—	GK	(Chile) CHI	
—	DF	(Chile) CHI	
—	MF	(Chile) CHI	
—	FW	(Chile) CHI	

== Performance ==
=== League ===
Season	Division	Nivel	Position	
2012	Tercera División B	V	1.°	4.° P
2013–A	Tercera División B	V	6.°	
2013–C	Tercera División B	V	5.°	
2014	Tercera División B	V	8.°	
2015	Tercera División B	V	8.°	
2016	Tercera División B	V	4.°	
2017	Tercera División B	V	11.°	
2018	Tercera División B	V	8.°	5.° R
2019	Tercera División B	V	11.°	6.° R
2020–22	Break			
2023	Tercera División B	V		

↑ Promoted ↓ Relegated

=== Cup ===
Season	Competition	Position
2015	Copa Absoluta	Group Stage
2016	Copa Absoluta	Group Stage
2022	Copa Chile	2nd Stage

✪ Champion

== Records ==
- Record Tercera División B victory
  - San Bernardo Unido 9:0 Deportes Cerro Navia
- Record Tercera División B defeat
  - Ferroviarios 11:2 San Bernardo Unido

== Kits ==
=== Home ===
2012/13; Ripholia	2014; JCQ	2015-A; Givova	2015/16-A; Unknown	2016/17; Four	2018/19; Fulza	2022/ Jez

=== Away ===
2012/13; Ripholia	2014; Ripholia	2015-A; Givova	2015/16-A; Unknown	2016/17; Mitre	2018/19; Mitre	2022/ JCQ

== Sponsorship ==
Period	Brand	Sponsor
2012—13	Ripholia	N/A
2014	JCQ	N/A
2015	Givova	N/A
2016—17	Four	N/A
2018—19	Fulza	Doña Cata
2020—22	Jez	Chacao Pizza
2023—	Jez	Pimps
