= Rodrigo Piñeiro =

Uruguayan footballer (born 1999)

Personal information
- Full name: Rodrigo Andrés Piñeiro Silva
- Date of birth: 5 May 1999 (age 27)
- Place of birth: Montevideo, Uruguay
- Height: 5 ft 9 in (1.75 m)
- Positions: Winger; forward

Team information
- Current team: América Mineiro

Youth career
- Miramar Misiones

Senior career*
| Years | Team | Apps | (Gls) |
| 2016–2018 | Miramar Misiones | 30 | (3) |
| 2018–2020 | Peñarol | 7 | (0) |
| 2019 | → Boston River (loan) | 7 | (0) |
| 2019 | → Rampla Juniors (loan) | 19 | (4) |
| 2020–2021 | Danubio | 20 | (3) |
| 2021–2023 | Nashville SC | 2 | (0) |
| 2022 | → Unión Española (loan) | 22 | (6) |
| 2023–2024 | Unión Española | 21 | (11) |
| 2024–2026 | Vélez Sarsfield | 13 | (0) |
| 2025 | → Everton (loan) | 17 | (1) |
| 2026– | América Mineiro | 0 | (0) |

International career^{‡}
| 2017 | Uruguay U18 | 3 | (1) |
| 2018 | Uruguay U20 | 2 | (0) |
| 2023 | Uruguay U23 | 4 | (0) |
- * Club domestic league appearances and goals as of 17:23, 26 February 2026 (UTC) ‡ National team caps and goals as of 1 November 2023

Rodrigo Andrés Piñeiro Silva (born 5 May 1999) is a Uruguayan professional footballer who plays as a winger or forward for América Mineiro.

== Career ==
Piñeiro started his career with Miramar Misiones.

On 3 February 2021, it was announced that Piñeiro was signed by Major League Soccer club Nashville SC.

In January 2024, Piñeiro joined Argentine Primera División club Vélez Sarsfield on a contract until the end of 2026. The next year, he returned to Chile to play for Everton.

== Honours ==
Vélez Sarsfield

- Argentine Primera División: 2024
