= Eduardo Pucheta =

Argentine footballer

Personal information
- Full name: Eduardo Raúl Pucheta
- Date of birth: 21 June 1992 (age 34)
- Place of birth: San Nicolás, Argentina
- Height: 1.70 m (5 ft 7 in)
- Position: Forward

Team information
- Current team: Provincial Ovalle

Youth career
- Vélez Sársfield

Senior career*
Years	Team	Apps	(Gls)
2011–2016	Vélez Sársfield	8	(0)
2014–2015	→ Celta Vigo B (loan)	13	(1)
2016–2022	Deportes Copiapó	154	(6)
2023	Deportes Puerto Montt	26	(0)
2024–	Provincial Ovalle	0	(0)
- * Club domestic league appearances and goals as of 15 November 2021

Eduardo Raúl Pucheta is an Argentine footballer who plays as a forward for Provincial Ovalle in the Segunda División Profesional de Chile.

== Career ==
In 2024, Pucheta signed with Provincial Ovalle in the Segunda División Profesional de Chile.

== Honours ==
Vélez Sársfield

- Argentine Primera División (2): 2012 Inicial, 2012–13 Superfinal
- Supercopa Argentina (1): 2013
