= Bastián San Juan =

Chilean footballer (born 1994)

Personal information
- Full name: Bastián Eladio San Juan Martínez
- Date of birth: 27 April 1994 (age 32)
- Place of birth: Talca, Chile
- Height: 1.77 m (5 ft 10 in)
- Position: Defender

Team information
- Current team: Cobreloa

Youth career
- 2011–2012: O'Higgins

Senior career*
Years	Team	Apps	(Gls)
2012–2021	O'Higgins	69	(2)
2019–2021	→ Everton (loan)	41	(1)
2021	Magallanes	30	(2)
2022–2023	Cobreloa	51	(3)
2024–2025	Rangers	60	(0)
2026–	Cobreloa	0	(0)
- * Club domestic league appearances and goals as of 15 December 2025

Bastián Eladio San Juan Martínez (born 27 April 1994) is a Chilean footballer who plays as a defender for Cobreloa.

== Career ==
He made his debut in the first team on 14 April 2013, in the match against Rangers de Talca, replacing Boris Sagredo in the minute 78.

In 2012, San Juan was runner-up with O'Higgins, after lose the final against Universidad de Chile in the penalty shoot-out.

In 2013, he won the Apertura 2013-14 with O'Higgins. In the tournament, he played in 2 of 18 matches.

In 2021, he signed with Magallanes in the Primera B de Chile.

In 2024, San Juan signed with Rangers after winning the 2023 Primera B with Cobreloa. He left them at the end of 2025 and returned to Cobreloa.

== Honours ==
O'Higgins

- Primera División: Apertura 2013-14
- Supercopa de Chile: 2014

Cobreloa

- Primera B (2): 2023, 2026

Individual

- Medalla Santa Cruz de Triana: 2014
