= Constitución Unido =

Chilean football club and father of Malleco unido

- Full name: Club Deportivo y Social Constitución Unido
- Founded: February 18, 1998
- Ground: Municipal Enrique Donn Müller; Constitución, Chile
- Capacity: 2,060
- Chairman: Cristóbal Faúndez
- Manager: Cristóbal Faúndez
- League: Tercera División
Home colours	Away colours

Club Deportivo y Social Constitución Unido is a Chilean football club based in Constitución, Chile.

The club was founded on February 18, 1998, and played for nine years in Tercera División A and 16 seasons in Segunda División de Chile.

== Stadium ==
- Estadio Enrique Donn Müller
- Estadio Mutrún, Constitución

== See also ==
- Chilean football league system
