= Estadio Municipal Luis Navarro Avilés =

Stadium in Santiago, Chile

Coordinates: 33.594481°S 70.690268°W

Estadio Municipal de San Bernardo
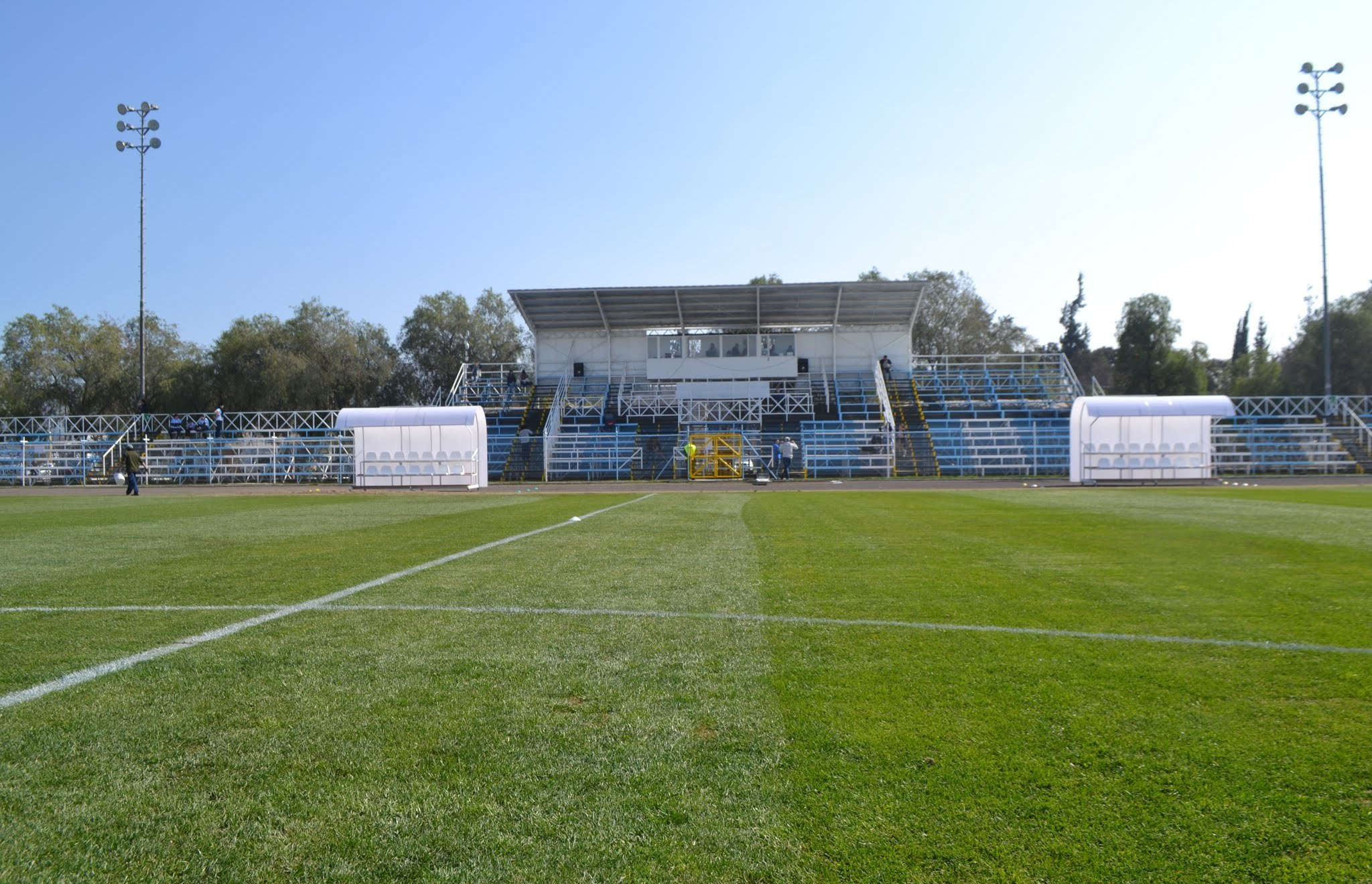
- Interactive map of Estadio Municipal de San Bernardo
- Location: San Bernardo, Santiago
- Owner: Municipality of San Bernardo
- Capacity: 3,500
- Surface: grass
- Field size: 105 x 68m

Tenants
- Magallanes; San Bernardo Unido

Estadio Municipal de San Bernardo is a stadium in San Bernardo, Santiago. It's Magallanes' home stadium.

The stadium holds 3,500 people.
