= Maximiliano Quinteros =

Argentine footballer

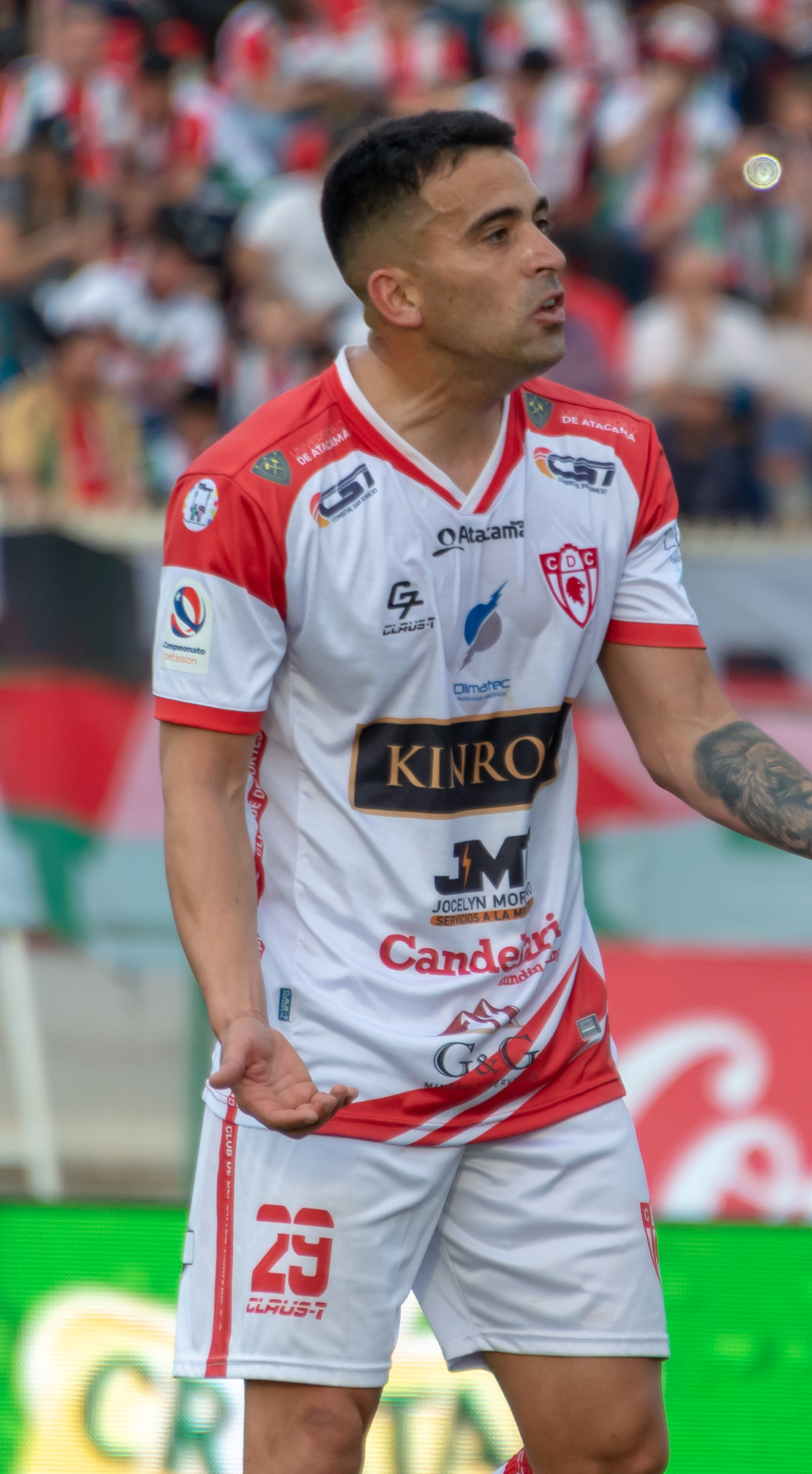
- Quinteros with Deportes Copiapó in 2023

Personal information
- Full name: Maximiliano Armando Quinteros
- Date of birth: 28 April 1989 (age 37)
- Place of birth: Avellaneda, Argentina
- Height: 1.77 m (5 ft 10 in)
- Position: Forward

Team information
- Current team: Brujas de Salamanca

Youth career
- 1993–2008: Racing Club

Senior career*
| Years | Team | Apps | (Gls) |
| 2008–2012 | Racing Club | 0 | (0) |
| 2010–2011 | → Deportivo Merlo (loan) | 8 | (0) |
| 2011 | → Argentino de Merlo (loan) | 8 | (0) |
| 2012 | → San Miguel (loan) | 8 | (2) |
| 2013–2015 | Jorge Newbery CR | 40 | (24) |
| 2014 | → General Rojo (loan) | 6 | (1) |
| 2016–2018 | Sacachispas | 76 | (38) |
| 2018 | Los Andes | 3 | (0) |
| 2019–2024 | Deportes Copiapó | 119 | (47) |
| 2020–2021 | → Universidad de Concepción (loan) | 22 | (4) |
| 2021 | → Ñublense (loan) | 26 | (6) |
| 2025 | Curicó Unido | 27 | (3) |
| 2026 | Sacachispas | 5 | (0) |
| 2026– | Brujas de Salamanca | 0 | (0) |
- * Club domestic league appearances and goals as of 27 July 2026

Maximiliano Armando Quinteros Noches (born 28 April 1989 in Argentina) is an Argentine-Chilean footballer who plays as a forward for Brujas de Salamanca.

== Career ==
Quinteros started his career with Argentine top flight side Racing Club de Avellaneda, but failed to make an appearance for them due to injury so was sent on loan to Deportivo Merlo, Argentino de Merlo, and Club Atlético San Miguel in the lower leagues. After a few unsuccessful trials, he signed for Argentine fifth division outfit Club Social, Deportivo y Cultural Alsina, with the aim of reaching the fourth division.

For 2015, Quinteros returned to Jorge Newbery de Comodoro Rivadavia in the Argentine fourth division, helping them avoid relegation.

For 2019, he signed for Chilean second division team Deportes Copiapó after failing to establish himself as a starter for Club Atlético Los Andes in the Argentine second division.

For 2020, Quinteros signed for Chilean top flight club C.D. Universidad de Concepción.

For 2021, Quinteros signed for Chilean top flight club Club Deportivo Ñublense

Back to his country of birth, Quinteros joined Sacachispas in the Primera C Metropolitana in February 2026. He moved back to Chile and joined Brujas de Salamanca in July of the same year.

== Personal life ==
He holds dual Argentine-Chilean nationality due to his Chilean descent.
