= Eric Godoy =

Chilean footballer (born 1987)

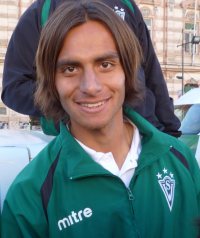
- Photograph of Eric Godoy, Santiago Wanderers first team player. 2010

Personal information
- Full name: Eric Orlando Godoy Zepeda
- Date of birth: 26 March 1987 (age 39)
- Place of birth: Valparaíso, Chile
- Height: 1.83 m (6 ft 0 in)
- Position: Defender

Youth career
- Academia Erasmo Zúñiga
- Santiago Wanderers

Senior career*
Years	Team	Apps	(Gls)
2005–2013	Santiago Wanderers	102	(6)
2013–2014	San Marcos	14	(0)
2014	Ottawa Fury		
2015	Deportes La Serena	13	(3)
2015–2018	Curicó Unido	70	(5)
2019	Cobresal	18	(2)
2020–2022	Universidad de Concepción	82	(4)

International career
2007	Chile U20	7	(0)
2011	Chile	1	(0)
- * Club domestic league appearances and goals

Eric Orlando Godoy Zepeda (born 26 March 1987) is a Chilean former footballer. He played defender.

== Career ==
He debuted in 2005 on the First Team from where he was called to join the national team.

Fighting a post holder, together with colleagues who serve as a central defender but also the DT Jorge Aravena puts it as midfielder, a position that was playing throw the José Sulantay process of FIFA U-20 World Cup.

=== National team ===
He was pre-selected sub 17 (2005). Moreover, in the presence sum Valparaíso team that participated in the Binacionals Goames of 2003.

Besides records attendances in the selection chilena sub 20 in the South American sub-20, 2007 (in the 4–2 victory over Peru as alternate) and friendly matches to prepare for it. He was a key player as the link connecting to the defense and midfield in Chile in 2007 FIFA U-20 World Cup in Canada. He played in 5 of 7 matches during the FIFA U-20 World Cup.

At senior level, he made one appearance in a friendly match against Paraguay in 2011.

== Personal life ==
After his retirement, he and his family moved to Montreal, Canada, since his wife is Chilean-Canadian.

== Honours ==
- 2007 South American U-20 Championship:
  - Fourth place: 2007
  - FIFA U-20 World Cup:
  - Third place: 2007
