= 2022 Campeonato Nacional Primera B =

Primera B de Chile
- Season: 2022
- Dates: 15 February – 27 November 2022
- Champions: Magallanes (1st title)
- Promoted: Magallanes; Deportes Copiapó
- Relegated: Fernandez Vial; Deportes Melipilla
- Matches: 280
- Goals: 659 (2.35 per match)
- Top goalscorer: Juan Ignacio Duma (14 goals)
- Biggest home win: Magallanes 7–0 Melipilla (9 October)
- Biggest away win: Cobreloa 0–5 Copiapó (27 November)
- Highest scoring: Barnechea 6–2 Iquique (11 May)

The 2022 Primera B de Chile, also known as Campeonato Ascenso Betsson 2022 for sponsorship purposes, was the 68th season of the Primera B de Chile, Chile's second-tier football league. The fixture for the season was announced on 1 February 2022, with the competition starting on 15 February and ending on 27 November 2022.

Magallanes were the champions, clinching their first Primera B title as well as promotion to Primera División on the final day of the regular season with a 2–0 win over Deportes Recoleta on 1 November 2022. The other promoted club was Deportes Copiapó, who won the promotion play-off after beating the regular season runners-up Cobreloa in the finals.

== Format ==
The tournament was played by 17 teams, 14 returning from the previous season, two relegated from the 2021 Campeonato Nacional (Deportes Melipilla and Santiago Wanderers), and the 2021 Segunda División Profesional champions Deportes Recoleta. The 17 teams played each other in a double round-robin tournament (once at home and once away) for a total of 32 matches, with every team having two bye rounds. The top team at the end of the 34 rounds was the champion and was promoted to the Campeonato Nacional for its 2023 season, while the next five teams played a play-off tournament (Liguilla) in which the league runners-up received a bye to the final. The playoffs winning team was the second and last promoted team to the top flight for the following season. Two teams were relegated to the Segunda División Profesional at the end of the season: the bottom-placed team in the league standings as well as the bottom-placed team in the relegation table, which considered the performance of teams in the 2021 and 2022 seasons.

== Teams ==
=== Stadia and locations ===
Locations of the 2022 Primera B de Chile teams

Club	City	Stadium	Capacity
Barnechea	Santiago (Lo Barnechea)	Municipal de Lo Barnechea	3,000
Cobreloa	Calama	Zorros del Desierto	12,346
Deportes Copiapó	Copiapó	Luis Valenzuela Hermosilla	8,000
Deportes Iquique	Iquique	Tierra de Campeones	13,171
Deportes Melipilla	Melipilla	Roberto Bravo Santibáñez	6,000
Deportes Puerto Montt	Puerto Montt	Chinquihue	10,000
Deportes Recoleta	Santiago (Recoleta)	Leonel Sánchez Lineros (Note: Deportes Recoleta played some of their home matches at Estadio Santa Laura-Universidad SEK in Santiago.)	1,000
Deportes Santa Cruz	Santa Cruz	Joaquín Muñoz García	5,000
Deportes Temuco	Temuco	Germán Becker	18,413
Fernandez Vial	Concepción	Alcaldesa Ester Roa Rebolledo	30,448
Magallanes	Santiago (San Bernardo)	Luis Navarro Avilés	3,500
Rangers	Talca	Fiscal de Talca	8,200
San Luis	Quillota	Lucio Fariña Fernández	7,680
Santiago Morning	Santiago (La Pintana)	Municipal de La Pintana	6,000
Santiago Wanderers	Valparaíso	Elías Figueroa Brander	20,575
Unión San Felipe	San Felipe	Municipal de San Felipe	12,000
Universidad de Concepción	Concepción	Alcaldesa Ester Roa Rebolledo	30,448

== Standings ==
Pos	Team	Pld	W	D	L	GF	GA	GD	Pts	Qualification or relegation
1	Magallanes (C, P)	32	22	6	4	61	23	+38	72	Promotion to Primera División and qualification for Copa Libertadores second stage (Note: Magallanes qualified as 2022 Copa Chile winners.)
2	Cobreloa	32	20	8	4	41	24	+17	68	Advance to Promotion play-off final
3	Deportes Copiapó (P)	32	15	7	10	46	34	+12	52	Advance to Promotion play-off quarter-finals
4	Unión San Felipe	32	15	7	10	38	35	+3	52	Advance to Promotion play-off quarter-finals
5	Deportes Puerto Montt	32	12	11	9	36	31	+5	47	Advance to Promotion play-off quarter-finals
6	Universidad de Concepción	32	12	10	10	41	33	+8	46	Advance to Promotion play-off quarter-finals
7	Rangers	32	14	4	14	39	40	−1	46	
8	Barnechea	32	12	8	12	47	43	+4	44	
9	Santiago Wanderers	32	10	12	10	37	37	0	42	
10	Deportes Temuco	32	10	8	14	31	41	−10	38	
11	Deportes Santa Cruz	32	9	9	14	34	39	−5	36	
12	Deportes Iquique	32	8	11	13	31	38	−7	35	
13	Deportes Recoleta	32	8	10	14	34	41	−7	34	
14	Santiago Morning	32	8	10	14	37	47	−10	34	
15	San Luis	32	7	13	12	27	42	−15	34	
16	Deportes Melipilla	32	7	9	16	29	48	−19	30	
17	Fernández Vial (R)	32	3	17	12	26	39	−13	26	Relegation to Segunda División Profesional

Source: ANFP, Soccerway
Rules for classification: 1) Points, 2) Goal difference, 3) Matches won, 4) Goals for, 5) Away goals for, 6) Red cards, 7) Yellow cards, 8) Drawing of lots, 9) Playoff game (only if needed to decide championship).
If needed to decide championship between two teams: 2) Playoff game.
(C) Champions; (P) Promoted; (R) Relegated

== Results ==
Home \ Away	BAR	COB	CDC	IQQ	MEL	DPM	REC	DSC	TEM	AFV	MAG	RAN	SLQ	SM	SW	USF	UDC
Barnechea	—	0–1	0–1	6–2	4–2	2–1	1–1	2–0	2–0	2–0	3–2	1–1	3–1	1–1	1–0	0–1	1–1
Cobreloa	3–2	—	2–0	2–1	1–0	2–1	3–0	1–0	1–0	1–0	1–0	1–0	2–1	2–2	1–1	1–0	1–0
Deportes Copiapó	1–1	2–0	—	1–0	2–1	5–0	3–2	4–2	1–0	4–0	2–2	0–1	1–1	2–1	1–1	0–1	2–1
Deportes Iquique	0–2	2–0	0–0	—	3–0	1–1	2–1	2–2	1–0	0–0	1–1	0–2	1–1	3–1	2–1	3–0	1–2
Deportes Melipilla	2–1	0–0	2–1	0–0	—	1–1	1–2	1–0	0–1	2–2	1–2	1–2	1–2	2–1	2–0	1–0	0–2
Deportes Puerto Montt	1–1	1–1	0–1	0–0	2–0	—	1–0	3–0	3–0	0–1	1–0	0–0	1–1	2–1	1–1	2–1	1–4
Deportes Recoleta	2–0	0–1	3–1	3–0	1–2	0–3	—	2–1	2–1	0–0	0–2	1–2	2–3	1–1	1–2	3–3	0–0
Deportes Santa Cruz	1–1	1–1	2–2	1–0	2–1	0–2	1–0	—	1–1	2–0	1–2	2–1	2–0	1–0	2–0	4–0	0–0
Deportes Temuco	4–1	2–0	0–4	3–2	1–1	0–1	2–2	1–1	—	1–1	2–4	1–2	1–0	2–1	1–0	1–0	1–0
Fernández Vial	0–1	2–3	1–2	0–0	1–1	2–2	0–0	1–0	0–0	—	1–1	0–1	1–1	0–1	0–0	1–1	2–3
Magallanes	4–0	2–1	1–0	1–0	7–0	2–0	2–1	0–0	1–0	2–1	—	2–0	3–0	1–1	0–1	1–0	1–0
Rangers	3–2	1–2	0–1	0–2	1–0	0–1	0–1	2–1	3–2	1–3	2–2	—	2–3	2–3	1–2	2–1	3–0
San Luis	1–0	0–0	0–0	0–0	2–1	0–3	2–1	0–0	1–1	0–0	0–2	0–0	—	1–2	1–1	2–2	0–2
Santiago Morning	1–1	0–1	2–1	1–0	1–1	0–0	1–2	2–1	1–2	1–1	2–3	3–0	1–0	—	1–2	1–1	0–2
Santiago Wanderers	1–3	2–2	1–0	2–0	2–2	2–0	0–0	2–0	3–0	2–2	0–2	1–3	1–2	2–2	—	0–1	0–0
Unión San Felipe	2–1	1–1	3–1	2–0	1–0	1–0	0–0	2–1	0–0	2–1	1–4	1–0	2–0	2–0	2–3	—	1–0
Universidad de Concepción	2–1	0–2	3–0	2–2	1–1	1–1	0–0	3–2	1–0	2–2	0–2	0–1	3–1	5–1	1–1	1–3	—

Source: ANFP, Soccerway
Legend: Blue = home team win; Yellow = draw; Red = away team win.

== Promotion playoff ==
=== Bracket ===
Quarter-finals
5	Deportes Puerto Montt	2	1	3
4	Unión San Felipe	1	0	1
6	Universidad de Concepción	0	1	1
3	Deportes Copiapó	0	5	5

Semi-final
5	Deportes Puerto Montt	3	0	3
3	Deportes Copiapó	0	4	4

Final
3	Deportes Copiapó	0	5	5
2	Cobreloa	0	0	0

=== Quarter-finals ===
6 November 2022
13:00 UTC−3

Deportes Puerto Montt	2–1	Unión San Felipe
Rosales 41'; Ojeda 53'	Report	Riveros 24'

Estadio Regional de Chinquihue, Puerto Montt
Attendance: 4,322
Referee: Rodrigo Carvajal
11 November 2022
18:00 UTC−3

Unión San Felipe	0–1	Deportes Puerto Montt
	Report	Ojeda 73'

Estadio Municipal, San Felipe
Attendance: 0
Referee: Felipe González

Deportes Puerto Montt won 3–1 on aggregate and advanced to the semi-final.

7 November 2022
20:00 UTC−3

Universidad de Concepción	0–0	Deportes Copiapó
	Report

Estadio Ester Roa, Concepción
Attendance: 1,753
Referee: Matías Quila
11 November 2022
20:30 UTC−3

Deportes Copiapó	5–1	Universidad de Concepción
Quinteros 34', 63', 71'; Soza 37'; Ponce 85'	Report	Godoy 56'

Estadio Luis Valenzuela Hermosilla, Copiapó
Attendance: 6,500
Referee: José Cabero

Deportes Copiapó won 5–1 on aggregate and advanced to the semi-final.

=== Semi-final ===
15 November 2022
20:30 UTC−3

Deportes Puerto Montt	3–0	Deportes Copiapó
Rosales 33'; Valdivia 49'; Ojeda 66'	Report

Estadio Regional de Chinquihue, Puerto Montt
Attendance: 5,918
Referee: Cristián Garay
19 November 2022
20:00 UTC−3

Deportes Copiapó	4–0	Deportes Puerto Montt
Bández 22'; Jaime 25'; Luna 66'; Quinteros 85'	Report

Estadio Luis Valenzuela Hermosilla, Copiapó
Referee: Nicolás Gamboa

Deportes Copiapó won 4–3 on aggregate and advanced to the final.

=== Final ===
23 November 2022
20:00 UTC−3

Deportes Copiapó	0–0	Cobreloa
	Report

Estadio Luis Valenzuela Hermosilla, Copiapó
Referee: Felipe González
27 November 2022
19:00 UTC−3

Cobreloa	0–5	Deportes Copiapó
	Report	Quinteros 14', 39', 74'; Luna 47'; Pucheta 67'

Estadio Zorros del Desierto, Calama
Referee: José Cabero

Deportes Copiapó won 5–0 on aggregate and were promoted to Primera División.

== Top scorers ==
Rank	Name	Club	Goals
1	(Argentina) Juan Ignacio Duma	Barnechea	14
2	(Argentina) Alfredo Ábalos	Rangers	13
2	(Chile) Pedro Muñoz	Deportes Santa Cruz	13
4	(Chile) César Cortés	Magallanes	12
4	(Argentina) David Escalante	Cobreloa	12
4	(Argentina) Óscar Ortega	Santiago Morning	12
7	(Paraguay) Arnaldo Castillo	Universidad de Concepción	11
7	(Chile) Steffan Pino	Santiago Morning	11
7	(Argentina) Maximiliano Quinteros	Deportes Copiapó	11
10	(Argentina) Lionel Altamirano	Rangers	9
10	(Chile) Sebastián Parada	San Luis	9

Source: Soccerway

== Relegation ==
For this season, a relegation table was elaborated by computing an average of the points earned per game over this season and the previous one. Promoted team Deportes Recoleta and the relegated ones Deportes Melipilla and Santiago Wanderers only had their points in the 2022 season averaged. The team placing last in this table at the end of the season was relegated. In case this team was also the last-placed one in the season's table, the team placed second-to-last in this table would also be relegated.

Pos	Team	2021 Pts	2021 Pld	2022 Pts	2022 Pld	Total Pts	Total Pld	Avg	Relegation
1	Magallanes	41	30	72	32	113	62	1.823	
2	Deportes Copiapó	52	30	52	32	104	62	1.677	
3	Cobreloa	33	30	68	32	101	62	1.629	
4	Deportes Puerto Montt	48	30	47	32	95	62	1.532	
5	Unión San Felipe	36	30	52	32	88	62	1.419	
6	Deportes Temuco	49	30	38	32	87	62	1.403	
7	Santiago Morning	51	30	34	32	85	62	1.371	
8	Santiago Wanderers	—	—	42	32	42	32	1.313	
9	Deportes Santa Cruz	45	30	36	32	81	62	1.306	
10	Rangers	35	30	46	32	81	62	1.306	
11	Universidad de Concepción	33	30	46	32	79	62	1.274	
12	Deportes Iquique	40	30	35	32	75	62	1.21	
13	San Luis	40	30	34	32	74	62	1.194	
14	Barnechea	24	30	44	32	68	62	1.097	
15	Fernández Vial	40	30	26	32	66	62	1.065	
16	Deportes Recoleta	—	—	34	32	34	32	1.063	
17	Deportes Melipilla (R)	—	—	30	32	30	32	0.938	Relegation to Segunda División Profesional

Source: ANFP

== See also ==
- 2022 Chilean Primera División
- 2022 Copa Chile
- 2022 Supercopa de Chile
