= 2025 Club Deportivo Universidad Católica season =

85th season in existence of Club Deportivo Universidad Católica

Universidad Católica
2025 season
- President: Juan Tagle
- Head coach: Tiago Nunes (until 25 May); Rodrigo Valenzuela (interim, 27 May to 12 June); Daniel Garnero (from 12 June)
- Stadium: Claro Arena
- League: 2nd
- Copa Chile: Group stage
- Sudamericana: First stage
- Top goalscorer: League: Fernando Zampedri (16); All: Fernando Zampedri (18)
- Highest home attendance: 20,242 v. Universidad de Chile; League, 16 October 2025
- Lowest home attendance: 6,499 v. Audax Italiano; League, 17 February 2025
- Average home league attendance: 12,659
- Biggest win: 6–0 v. Everton (H); League, 25 April 2025
- Biggest defeat: 0–3 v. Coquimbo Unido (H); League, 27 July 2025
- All statistics correct as of 6 December 2025.

The 2025 Club Deportivo Universidad Católica season was the 85th season and the club's 51th consecutive season in the top flight of Chilean football. In addition to the domestic league, Universidad Católica also competed in the Copa Chile and the Copa Sudamericana.

This season marked the first to be played at the renovated stadium, Claro Arena. The stadium was officially closed in 2022 for redevelopment, during which time the club played its home matches primarily at Estadio Santa Laura. On August 23, 2025, the club’s stadium was officially reopened with a 2–0 victory over Unión Española.

== Kits ==
Puma enters its second consecutive year as Universidad Católica’s official kit supplier, having succeeded Under Armour at the start of the 2024 season.

| Home | Away | Third | Special edition |

| Goalkeeper | Goalkeeper | Goalkeeper |

- Home: The club unveiled its home strip for the 2025 season on December 5, 2024. Adhering to the club’s traditional identity, the kit features a white jersey with blue accents, complemented by blue shorts and white socks.
- Away: On January 10, the club released its new away kit. The jersey features a dark navy base with lighter navy tonal details. The look is completed with white shorts and socks.
- Third: On April 20, the third kit was officially launched, featuring a blue base with contrasting "off-red" accents. It is paired with blue shorts and matching socks.
- Commemorative : On July 15, the club introduced a commemorative edition inspired by the newly renovated Claro Arena. The jersey features a white base with 'off-blue' detailing that echoes the stadium’s architecture; the front displays a depiction of the modern Claro Arena alongside the Andes Mountains, while the back pays tribute to the historic San Carlos de Apoquindo Stadium.

== Squad ==
=== First team ===
As of 6 December 2025

| N | Nat. | Position | Name | Age | Signed in | Ends | Previous Club | App | Goals | Notes |
Goalkeepers
| 1 | (Chile) | GK | Vicente Bernedo | 24 | 2021 | 2027 | Cobreloa | 37 | 0 | Originally from academy |
| 24 | (Chile) | GK | Martín Contreras | 20 | 2024 | 2026 | Academy | 1 | 0 | |
| 27 | (Chile) | GK | Darío Melo | 32 | 2025 | 2025 | Deportes Melipilla | 0 | 0 | |
Defenders
| 2 | (Chile) | DF | Daniel González | 23 | 2022 | 2026 | Santiago Wanderers | 92 | 3 | |
| 3 | (Chile) | DF | Eugenio Mena | 37 | 2023 | 2025 | Racing Club | 84 | 2 | |
| 4 | (Chile) | DF | Ignacio Pérez | 19 | 2025 | 2027 | Academy | 7 | 0 | |
| 5 | (Chile) | DF | Valber Huerta | 32 | 2024 | 2026 | Deportivo Toluca | 120 | 6 | |
| 6 | (Chile) | DF | Sebastián Arancibia | 19 | 2025 | 2028 | Academy | 18 | 0 | |
| 15 | (Chile) | DF | Cristián Cuevas | 30 | 2022 | 2026 | Huachipato | 114 | 5 | |
| 19 | (Chile) | DF | Branco Ampuero | 32 | 2022 | 2026 | Deportes Antofagasta | 170 | 5 | |
| 21 | (Chile) | DF | Dylan Escobar | 25 | 2025 | 2025 | Coquimbo Unido | 12 | 0 | |
| 7 | (Chile) | DF | Tomás Asta-Buruaga | 29 | 2020 | 2025 | Everton | 100 | 3 | |
Midfielders
| 8 | (Argentina) | CM | Fernando Zuqui | 34 | 2024 | 2026 | Estudiantes | 29 | 2 | |
| 16 | (Venezuela) | CM | Leenhan Romero | 19 | 2024 | 2027 | Academy | 6 | 0 | |
| 17 | (Chile) | CM | Gary Medel | 38 | 2025 | 2025 | Boca Juniors | 109 | 1 | Originally from academy |
| 20 | (Colombia) | CM | Jhojan Valencia | 29 | 2025 | 2025 | Austin | 35 | 0 | |
| 22 | (Chile) | CM | Alfred Canales | 25 | 2024 | 2026 | Magallanes | 58 | 3 | |
| 25 | (Argentina) | CM | Agustín Farías | 38 | 2024 | 2025 | Palestino | 41 | 0 | Second nationality: Chilean |
Forwards
| 9 | (Argentina) | FW | Fernando Zampedri (c) | 37 | 2020 | 2025 | Rosario Central | 225 | 139 | Second nationality: Chilean |
| 11 | (Chile) | FW | Clemente Montes | 24 | 2019 | 2025 | Academy | 126 | 15 | |
| 14 | (Chile) | FW | Juan Francisco Rossel | 20 | 2023 | 2027 | Academy | 43 | 3 | |
| 18 | (Venezuela) | FW | Eduard Bello | 30 | 2025 | 2025 | Barcelona | 31 | 7 | |
| 25 | (Chile) | FW | Diego Corral | 20 | 2026 | 2026 | Academy | 27 | 2 | |
| 30 | (Chile) | FW | Diego Valencia | 25 | 2025 | 2027 | Salernitana | 161 | 34 | Originally from academy |
Player(s) transferred out during this season
| 13 | (Chile) | GK | Thomas Gillier | 21 | 2024 | 2025 | Academy | 26 | 0 | |
| 7 | (Brazil) | GK | Jader Gentil | 22 | 2024 | 2025 | Athletico Paranaense | 25 | 4 | |
| 28 | (Chile) | GK | Francisco Arancibia | 29 | 2024 | 2025 | Cobreloa | 19 | 0 | |
Player(s) on loan during this season
| 12 | (Chile) | GK | Guillermo Soto | 31 | 2024 | 2026 | Baltika Kaliningrad | 37 | 0 | Originally from academy |

=== Reserve team ===
| N | Nat. | Position | Name | Age | Signed in | Ends | Previous Club | App | Goals | Notes |
|---|---|---|---|---|---|---|---|---|---|---|
| 24 | (Chile) | GK | Francisco Valdés | 19 | 2025 | 2028 | Academy | 0 | 0 | |
| 42 | (United States) | DF | Nickolas Pino | 19 | 2025 | 2028 | Academy | 0 | 0 | Second nationality: Chilean |
| 44 | (Chile) | DF | José Ignacio Salas | 17 | 2025 | 2026 | Academy | 2 | 0 | |
| 45 | (South Africa) | DF | Jeffrey Sekgota | 19 | 2025 | 2028 | Academy | 0 | 0 | Second nationality: Chilean |
| 34 | (Chile) | DF | Francisco Daza | 17 | 2025 | 2028 | Academy | 0 | 0 | |
| 37 | (Chile) | DF | Joaquín Meneses | 17 | 2025 | 2028 | Academy | 0 | 0 | |
| 33 | (Chile) | CM | Nicolás Letelier | 20 | 2025 | 2028 | Academy | 3 | 0 | |
| 46 | (Chile) | CM | Vicente Cárcamo | 20 | 2025 | 2029 | Academy | 3 | 0 | |
| 29 | (Chile) | FW | Axel Cerda | 19 | 2026 | 2027 | Academy | 5 | 0 | |
| 31 | (Chile) | FW | Bastián Gómez | 19 | 2025 | 2026 | Academy | 4 | 0 | |
| 43 | (Chile) | FW | Amaro Pérez | 16 | 2025 | 2028 | Academy | 0 | 0 | |
| 38 | (Colombia) | FW | Nicolás Girón | 18 | 2025 | 2028 | Academy | 0 | 0 | |
Player(s) on loan during this season
| 44 | (Chile) | GK | Milan Tudor | 21 | 2023 | 2027 | Academy | 2 | 0 | |

== Contracts and transfers ==
=== New contracts ===
| Date | Pos. | Name | Contract length | Contract ends | Ref. |
|---|---|---|---|---|---|
| 15 November 2024 | DF | (Chile) Eugenio Mena | 1-year | 2025 | |
| 12 December 2024 | DF | (Chile) Cristián Cuevas | 2-year | 2026 | |
| 6 January 2025 | FW | (Chile) Martín Hiriart | 2-year | 2027 | |
| 8 January 2025 | MF | (Chile) Nicolás L’Huillier | 2-year | 2027 | |
| 30 January 2025 | FW | (Chile) Bastián Gómez, | 2-year | 2027 | |
| 7 March 2025 | DF | (Chile) Sebastián Arancibia | 3-year | 2028 | |
| 13 March 2025 | DF | (United States) (Chile) Nickolas Pino | 3-year | 2028 | |
| 11 September 2025 | FW | (Chile) Joaquín Meneses | 3-year | 2028 | |
| 11 September 2025 | DF | (Chile) José Salas | 3-year | 2028 | |
| 11 September 2025 | FW | (Chile) Amaro Pérez | 3-year | 2028 | |
| 17 September 2025 | GK | (Chile) Vicente Bernedo | 1-year | 2027 | |
| 17 September 2025 | DF | (Chile) Daniel González | 1-year | 2026 | |
| 8 October 2025 | MF | (Chile) Vicente Cárcamo | 4-year | 2029 | |
| 8 October 2025 | DF | (South Africa) (Chile) Jeffrey Sekgota | 3-year | 2028 | |
| 8 October 2025 | MF | (Chile) Nicolás Letelier | 3-year | 2028 | |
| 1 December 2025 | DF | (Chile) Francisco Daza | 3-year | 2028 | |
| 1 December 2025 | FW | (Colombia) Nicolás Girón | 3-year | 2028 | |

=== Transfers in ===
| Date | Pos. | Name | From | Type | Ref. |
|---|---|---|---|---|---|
| 21 November 2024 | DF | (Chile) Tomás Asta-Buruaga | Everton | End of loan | |
| 19 December 2024 | MF | (Colombia) Jhojan Valencia | (United States) Austin | Free transfer | |
| 9 January 2025 | DF | (Chile) Gary Medel | (Argentina) Boca Juniors | Free transfer | |
| 3 February 2025 | FW | (Chile) Diego Valencia | (Italy) Salernitana | Free transfer | |
| 5 March 2025 | GK | (Chile) Darío Melo | Deportes Melipilla | Free transfer | |

=== Transfers out ===
| Date | Pos. | Name | From | Type | Ref. |
|---|---|---|---|---|---|
| 11 October 2024 | MF | (Argentina) Joaquín Torres | (United States) Philadelphia Union | Contract terminated | |
| 10 November 2024 | FW | (Chile) Nicolás Castillo | Santiago City | Contract terminated | |
| 10 November 2024 | DF | (Venezuela) Aaron Astudillo | Cobresal | Contract terminated | |
| 10 November 2024 | MF | (Chile) Ian Toro | Rangers | Contract terminated | |
| 11 November 2024 | DF | (Uruguay) Gary Kagelmacher | (Uruguay) Montevideo City | Contract terminated | |
| 11 December 2024 | GK | (Chile) Sebastián Pérez | Palestino | Contract terminated | |
| 31 December 2024 | FW | (Chile) Gonzalo Tapia | (Argentina) River Plate | Contract terminated | |
| 31 December 2024 | DF | (Chile) Carlos Salomón | Deportes Copiapó | Contract terminated | |
| 31 December 2024 | DF | (Chile) Alfonso Parot | Deportes Limache | Contract terminated | |
| 31 December 2024 | MF | (Chile) César Pinares | Deportes Limache | Contract terminated | |
| 6 June 2025 | FW | (Chile) Luis Hernández | Deportes Limache | Contract terminated | |
| 14 June 2025 | GK | (Chile) Thomas Gillier | (Italy) Bologna | Contract terminated | |
| 30 June 2025 | FW | (Brazil) Jader Gentil | (Portugal) Santa Clara | End of loan | |
| 21 July 2025 | FW | (Chile) Francisco Arancibia | (Peru) Garcilaso | Contract terminated | |

=== Loans in ===
| Date | Pos. | Name | From | End date | Ref. |
|---|---|---|---|---|---|
| 16 December 2024 | DF | (Chile) Dylan Escobar | Coquimbo Unido | End of season | |
| 10 January 2025 | FW | (Venezuela) Eduard Bello | (Ecuador) Barcelona | End of season | |

=== Loans out ===
| Date | Pos. | Name | From | End date | Ref. |
|---|---|---|---|---|---|
| 26 December 2024 | FW | (Chile) Jorge Ortiz | Deportes La Serena | 31 December 2025 | |
| 8 January 2025 | MF | (Chile) Bryan González | Unión San Felipe | 31 December 2025 | |
| 13 January 2025 | DF | (Chile) Luis Muñoz | Deportes Santa Cruz | 31 December 2025 | |
| 27 January 2025 | DF | (Chile) Nicolás L'Huillier | Deportes Concepción | 31 December 2025 | |
| 5 March 2025 | FW | (Chile) Martín Hiriart | Unión La Calera | 31 December 2025 | |
| 16 June 2025 | DF | (Chile) Guillermo Soto | (Argentina) Tigre | 30 June 2026 | |
| 18 July 2025 | FW | (Chile) Milan Tudor | Trasandino | 31 December 2025 | |

== Kits ==
Supplier: Puma / Sponsor: Banco BICE / Sleeve sponsor: 1xBet, Sodimac, Samsung and Fortinet.

== Pre-season and friendlies ==
On 27 November, 2024 Universidad Católica announced pre-season to Uruguay, with two friendly confirmed against Unión de Santa Fe and Atlético Tucumán. Days later, a trip to Perú was announced to face Sporting Cristal.

| 11 January 2025 | Unión de Santa Fe | 1:3 | Universidad Católica | Montevideo |
| | Verde 6' | Report | Gentil 59'; Canales 63'; Montes 85' | Stadium: Estadio Luis Franzini; Referee: Javier Feres |

| 12 January 2025 | Nacional | 1:1 | Universidad Católica | Montevideo |
| | | Report | Montes | Stadium: Complejo |

| 14 January 2025 | Universidad Católica | 3:2 | Atlético Tucumán | Maldonado |
| | Gentil 30'; Zampedri 44', 53' | Report | Rodríguez 5'; Estigarribia 82' | Stadium: Campus de Maldonado |

| 19 January 2025 | Sporting Cristal | 2:1 | Universidad Católica | Lima |
| | Sosa 27'; Ávila 70' | Report | Montes 25' | Stadium: Alberto Gallardo |

== Competitions ==
=== Overview ===
| Competition | First match | Last match | Starting round | Final position | Record | | | | | | | |
| Competition | First match | Last match | Starting round | Final position | Pld | W | D | L | GF | GA | GD | Win % |
|---|---|---|---|---|---|---|---|---|---|---|---|---|
| League | 17 February 2025 | 6 December 2025 | Matchday 1 | 2nd | 30 | 17 | 7 | 6 | 44 | 26 | +18 | 56.67 |
| Copa Chile | 26 January 2025 | 11 May 2025 | Group stage | Group stage | 6 | 1 | 1 | 4 | 7 | 10 | −3 | 16.67 |
| Copa Sudamericana | 4 March 2025 | 4 March 2025 | First stage | First stage | 1 | 0 | 1 | 0 | 1 | 1 | +0 | 0.00 |
| Total | | | | | 37 | 18 | 9 | 10 | 52 | 37 | +15 | 48.65 |

Last updated: 6 December 2025
Source: Soccerway

=== Primera Division ===
==== League table ====
| Pos | Team | Pld | W | D | L | GF | GA | GD | Pts | Qualification or relegation |
|---|---|---|---|---|---|---|---|---|---|---|
| 1 | Coquimbo Unido (C) | 30 | 23 | 6 | 1 | 49 | 17 | +32 | 75 | Qualification for Copa Libertadores group stage |
| 2 | Universidad Católica | 30 | 17 | 7 | 6 | 44 | 26 | +18 | 58 | Qualification for Copa Libertadores group stage |
| 3 | O'Higgins | 30 | 16 | 8 | 6 | 43 | 34 | +9 | 56 | Qualification for Copa Libertadores second stage |
| 4 | Universidad de Chile | 30 | 17 | 4 | 9 | 58 | 32 | +26 | 55 | Qualification for Copa Sudamericana first stage |
| 5 | Audax Italiano | 30 | 16 | 4 | 10 | 51 | 43 | +8 | 52 | Qualification for Copa Sudamericana first stage |

Source: Campeonato Chileno, Soccerway
Rules for classification: 1) Points, 2) Playoff game (only if needed to decide championship between two teams), 3) Goal difference, 4) Matches won, 5) Goals for, 6) Away goals for, 7) Red cards, 8) Yellow cards, 9) Drawing of lots.
(C) Champions

==== Results summary ====
| Overall | | | | | | | | Home | | | | | | Away | | | | | |
| Pld | W | D | L | GF | GA | GD | Pts | W | D | L | GF | GA | GD | W | D | L | GF | GA | GD |
|---|---|---|---|---|---|---|---|---|---|---|---|---|---|---|---|---|---|---|---|
| 30 | 17 | 7 | 6 | 44 | 26 | +18 | 58 | 12 | 0 | 3 | 26 | 13 | +13 | 5 | 7 | 3 | 18 | 13 | +5 |

Source: Primera Division

==== Results by round ====
| Round | 1 | 2 | 3 | 4 | 5 | 6 | 7 | 8 | 9 | 10 | 11 | 12 | 13 | 14 | 15 | 16 | 17 | 18 | 19 | 20 | 21 | 22 | 23 | 24 | 25 | 26 | 27 | 28 | 29 | 30 |
|---|---|---|---|---|---|---|---|---|---|---|---|---|---|---|---|---|---|---|---|---|---|---|---|---|---|---|---|---|---|---|
| Ground | H | A | H | A | H | A | A | H | H | A | A | H | A | H | A | A | H | A | H | A | H | H | A | A | H | H | A | H | A | H |
| Result | W | L | W | D | W | W | D | W | W | L | L | L | D | W | D | D | L | D | W | W | W | W | W | W | W | L | W | W | D | W |
| Position | 5 | 9 | 7 | 7 | 8 | 6 | 5 | 5 | 1 | 5 | 5 | 6 | 8 | 8 | 6 | 5 | 6 | 7 | 8 | 6 | 6 | 6 | 2 | 2 | 2 | 2 | 2 | 2 | 2 | 2 |

Source: Primera Division
A = Away; H = Home; W = Win; D = Draw; L = Loss; F = Free round

==== Matches ====
| 17 February 2025 1 | Universidad Católica | 3–1 | Audax Italiano | Independencia |
| | Montes 7', 24'; Valencia 80' (pen.) | Report | Palacios 33' (pen.) | Stadium: Santa Laura; Attendance: 6.499; Referee: Felipe González Alveal |

| 22 February 2025 2 | Coquimbo Unido | 1–0 | Universidad Católica | Coquimbo |
| | Johansen 82' | Report | | Stadium: Francisco Sánchez; Attendance: 8.712; Referee: Reinerio Alvarado |

| 1 March 2025 3 | Universidad Católica | 1–0 | Deportes Iquique | La Florida |
| | Bello 40' | Report | | Stadium: Bicentenario; Attendance: 7.825; Referee: Gastón Philippe |

| 8 March 2025 4 | Ñublense | 1–1 | Universidad Católica | Chillán |
| | Reyes 90+7' | Report | Zuqui 46' | Stadium: Nelson Oyarzún; Attendance: 6.492; Referee: José Cabero |

| 28 March 2025 6 | Unión Española | 1–2 | Universidad Católica | Nuñoa |
| | Aránguiz 77' | Report | Zampedri 15'; Bello 54' | Stadium: Nacional; Attendance: 7.406; Referee: José Cabero |

| 12 April 2025 7 | Cobresal | 1–1 | Universidad Católica | El Salvador |
| | Céspedes 19' | Report | Rossel 45+5' | Stadium: El Cobre; Attendance: 736; Referee: Diego Flores |

| 19 April 2025 8 | Universidad Católica | 2–1 | Deportes Limache | Viña del Mar |
| | Zampedri 88' (pen.); Jader 90+5' | Report | D. González 20' (a.g.) | Stadium: Sausalito; Attendance: 6.518; Referee: Rodrigo Carvajal |

| 25 April 2025 9 | Universidad Católica | 6–0 | Everton | La Florida |
| | Zampedri 13', 45'; Montes 33', 79'; Jader 56'; Mena 87' | Report | | Stadium: Bicentenario; Attendance: 6.541; Referee: Juan Lara |

| 3 May 2025 10 | Universidad de Chile | 1–0 | Universidad Católica | Nuñoa |
| | Contreras 90+7' | Report | | Stadium: Nacional; Attendance: 43.850; Referee: Franco Jiménez |

| 17 May 2025 11 | O'Higgins | 2–0 | Universidad Católica | La Florida |
| | Rabello 6' (pen.), 62' | Report | | Stadium: Bicentenario; Attendance: 3.552; Referee: José Cabero |

| 25 May 2025 12 | Universidad Católica | 1–3 | Deportes La Serena | Independencia |
| | Zampedri 90+8' (pen.) | Report | Jara 11'; Chamorro 57'; Vargas 74' (pen.) | Stadium: Santa Laura; Attendance: 10.003; Referee: Piero Maza |

| 1 June 2025 13 | Palestino | 1–1 | Universidad Católica | La Cisterna |
| | Carrasco 32' | Report | Zampedri 78' | Stadium: Municipal; Attendance: 3.794; Referee: Juan Lara |

| 14 June 2025 14 | Universidad Católica | 1–0 | Huachipato | Independencia |
| | Zampedri 53' (pen.) | Report | | Stadium: Santa Laura; Attendance: 7.133; Referee: Nicolás Gamboa |

| 20 June 2025 15 | Unión La Calera | 1–1 | Universidad Católica | La Calera |
| | Zampedri 7' (a.g.) | Report | Zampedri 39' | Stadium: Nicolás Chahuán; Attendance: 2.656; Referee: Felipe Gonzalez |

| 6 July 2025 (Note: The match was originally scheduled for 15 March 2025) 5 | Universidad Católica | 2–0 | Colo-Colo | Independencia |
| | González 70'; Corral 90+5' | Report | | Stadium: Santa Laura; Attendance: 12.807; Referee: Mathias Riquelme |

| 20 July 2025 16 | Audax Italiano | 1–1 | Universidad Católica | La Florida |
| | L. Valencia 69' | Report | D. Valencia 12' | Stadium: Bicentenario; Attendance: 4.906; Referee: Cristián Garay |

| 27 July 2025 17 | Universidad Católica | 0–3 | Coquimbo Unido | Independencia |
| | | Report | Chandía 32'; Cordero 38'; Johansen 82' | Stadium: Santa Laura; Attendance: 9.790; Referee: Diego Flores |

| 2 August 2025 18 | Deportes Iquique | 2–2 | Universidad Católica | Iquique |
| | Puch 35' (pen.); Pino 86' | Report | Zampedri 26' (pen.); Montes 44' | Stadium: Tierra de Campeones; Attendance: 7.728; Referee: Fernando Vejar |

| 16 August 2025 20 | Colo-Colo | 1–4 | Universidad Católica | Macul |
| | Wiemberg 43' | Report | Cuevas 1', 46'; Asta-Buruaga 12'; Zampedri 33' | Stadium: Monumental; Attendance: 0 Referee: Cristián Garay |

| 23 August 2025 21 | Universidad Católica | 2–0 | Unión Española | Las Condes |
| | Zampedri 31'; Bello 90+4' | Report | | Stadium: Claro Arena; Attendance: 20.141; Referee: Rodrigo Carvajal |

| 30 August 2025 22 | Universidad Católica | 2–1 | Cobresal | Las Condes |
| | Ampuero 49'; Tiznado 86' (a.g.) | Report | Coelho 37' | Stadium: Claro Arena; Attendance: 17.537; Referee: Piero Maza |

| 13 September 2025 23 | Deportes Limache | 0–1 | Universidad Católica | Quillota |
| | | Report | D. Valencia 52' | Stadium: Lucio Fariña; Attendance: 4.225; Referee: Mathias Riquelme |

| 9 October 2025 (Note: The match was originally scheduled for 10 August 2025) 19 | Universidad Católica | 1–0 | Ñublense | Las Condes |
| | Bello 6' | Report | | Stadium: Claro Arena; Attendance: 15.718; Referee: Héctor Jona |

| 19 October 2025 24 | Everton | 0–3 | Universidad Católica | Viña del Mar |
| | | Report | Zampedri 26', 39' (pen.), 54' | Stadium: Sausalito; Attendance: 6.124; Referee: Manuel Vergara |

| 26 October 2025 25 | Universidad Católica | 1–0 | Universidad de Chile | Las Condes |
| | Canales 72' | Report | | Stadium: Claro Arena; Attendance: 20.242; Referee: Juan Lara |

| 2 November 2025 26 | Universidad Católica | 0–2 | O'Higgins | Las Condes |
| | | Report | Pavez 35'; Rabello 47' | Stadium: Claro Arena; Attendance: 16.957; Referee: Héctor Jona |

| 8 November 2025 27 | Deportes La Serena | 0–1 | Universidad Católica | La Serena |
| | | Report | Zampedri 49' | Stadium: La Portada; Attendance: 4.221; Referee: Cristián Garay |

| 22 November 2025 28 | Universidad Católica | 2–1 | Palestino | Las Condes |
| | Zampedri 33' (pen.); Bello 59' | Report | Marabel 56' | Stadium: Claro Arena; Attendance: 15.832; Referee: Mathias Riquelme |

| 29 November 2025 29 | Huachipato | 0–0 | Universidad Católica | Talcahuano |
| | | Report | | Stadium: Huachipato; Attendance: 3.578; Referee: Cristian Galaz |

| 6 December 2025 30 | Universidad Católica | 2–1 | Unión La Calera | Las Condes |
| | Montes 54'; Bello 70' | Report | Mesías 38' | Stadium: Claro Arena; Attendance: 16.340; Referee: Fernando Vejar |

=== Copa Chile ===
The group stage draw was held on 15 January 2025, and matches in the group stage were played from 24 January to 12 May 2025.

==== Group stage ====
Group D

| Pos | Team | Pld | W | D | L | GF | GA | GD | Pts | Qualification | ULC | SLQ | EVE | UC |
|---|---|---|---|---|---|---|---|---|---|---|---|---|---|---|
| 1 | Unión La Calera | 6 | 3 | 2 | 1 | 5 | 4 | +1 | 11 | Advance to the knockout stage | — | 0–0 | 1–0 | 2–2 |
| 2 | San Luis | 6 | 3 | 1 | 2 | 8 | 7 | +1 | 10 | Advance to the knockout stage | 0–1 | — | 3–2 | 2–1 |
| 3 | Everton | 6 | 3 | 0 | 3 | 7 | 6 | +1 | 9 | | 2–0 | 1–0 | — | 2–1 |
| 4 | Universidad Católica | 6 | 1 | 1 | 4 | 7 | 10 | −3 | 4 | | 0–1 | 2–3 | 1–0 | — |

Source: Campeonato Chileno, Soccerway
Legend: Blue = home team win; Yellow = draw; Red = away team win.
Rules for classification: 1) Points; 2) Goal difference; 3) Matches won; 4) Goals for; 5) Away goals for; 6) Red cards; 7) Yellow cards; 8) Copa Chile ranking; 9) Drawing of lots.

Matches

| 26 January 2025 1 | Universidad Católica | 1–0 | Everton | La Florida |
| | González 77' | | | Stadium: Bicentenario; Attendance: 7.805; Referee: Diego Flores |

| 1 February 2025 2 | San Luis | 2–1 | Universidad Católica | Quillota |
| | Parada 1'; Novero 16' | | Bello 89' | Stadium: Lucio Fariña; Attendance: 5.000; Referee: Nicolás Gamboa |

| 10 February 2025 3 | Unión La Calera | 2–2 | Universidad Católica | La Calera |
| | Mesías 46', 78' | | Jader 35'; Corral 90' | Stadium: Nicolás Chahuán; Attendance: 3.743; Referee: Piero Maza |

| 21 March 2025 4 | Universidad Católica | 0–1 | Unión La Calera | Temuco |
| | | | Yáñez 88' | Stadium: Germán Becker; Attendance: 6.037; Referee: Juan Lara |

| 3 April 2025 5 | Universidad Católica | 2–3 | San Luis | La Florida |
| | Zuqui 36'; Rossel 82' | | Parada 45+1' (pen.); Donoso 77' (pen.); Albertengo 90+7' | Stadium: Bicentenario; Attendance: 4.823; Referee: Héctor Jona |

| 11 May 2025 6 | Everton | 2–1 | Universidad Católica | Viña del Mar |
| | Madrid 1'; González 36' | | Zampedri 17' (pen.) | Stadium: Sausalito; Referee: Mathías Riquelme |

=== Copa Sudamericana ===
The draw for the first stage was held on 19 December 2024, 12:00 PYT (UTC−3), at the CONMEBOL Convention Centre in Luque, Paraguay.

==== First stage ====
| 4 March 2025 | Universidad Católica (Chile) | 1–1 (4–5 p) | (Chile) Palestino | Coquimbo |
| 21:30 UTC−5 | Zampedri 88' | Report | Carrasco 11'; Fernández (yellow card) (yellow-red card) | Stadium: Estadio Francisco Sánchez Rumoroso; Attendance: 2,706; Referee: Yael Falcón Pérez (Argentina) |
| | Penalties |
| | Zampedri (penalty scored); Jader (penalty scored); Cuevas (penalty scored); D. Valencia (penalty scored); Ampuero (penalty missed) | | (penalty scored) Martínez; (penalty scored) Tapia; (penalty scored) Meza; (penalty scored) Zúñiga; (penalty scored) Marabel |

== Statistics ==
=== Squad statistics ===
| No. | Pos | Nat | Player | Total | | League | | Copa Chile | | Copa Sudamericana | |
| No. | Pos | Nat | Player | Apps | Goals | Apps | Goals | Apps | Goals | Apps | Goals |
|---|---|---|---|---|---|---|---|---|---|---|---|
| 1 | GK | (Chile) | Vicente Bernedo | 34 | 0 | 30 | 0 | 3 | 0 | 1 | 0 |
| 2 | DF | (Chile) | Daniel González | 30 | 2 | 28 | 1 | 2 | 1 | 0 | 0 |
| 3 | DF | (Chile) | Eugenio Mena | 26 | 1 | 22 | 1 | 4 | 0 | 0 | 0 |
| 4 | DF | (Chile) | Ignacio Pérez | 8 | 0 | 8 | 0 | 0 | 0 | 0 | 0 |
| 6 | DF | (Chile) | Sebastián Arancibia | 18 | 0 | 15 | 0 | 3 | 0 | 0 | 0 |
| 7 | DF | (Chile) | Tomás Asta-Buruaga | 27 | 1 | 22 | 1 | 4 | 0 | 1 | 0 |
| 7 | FW | (Brazil) | Jader Gentil † | 17 | 3 | 11 | 2 | 5 | 1 | 1 | 0 |
| 8 | MF | (Argentina) | Fernando Zuqui | 16 | 2 | 12 | 1 | 3 | 1 | 1 | 0 |
| 9 | FW | (Argentina) | Fernando Zampedri | 31 | 18 | 25 | 16 | 5 | 1 | 1 | 1 |
| 11 | FW | (Chile) | Clemente Montes | 34 | 6 | 28 | 6 | 5 | 0 | 1 | 0 |
| 12 | DF | (Chile) | Guillermo Soto † | 10 | 0 | 5 | 0 | 5 | 0 | 0 | 0 |
| 13 | GK | (Chile) | Thomas Gillier † | 2 | 0 | 0 | 0 | 2 | 0 | 0 | 0 |
| 14 | FW | (Chile) | Juan Francisco Rossel | 23 | 2 | 19 | 1 | 3 | 1 | 1 | 0 |
| 15 | MF | (Chile) | Cristián Cuevas | 30 | 2 | 23 | 2 | 6 | 0 | 1 | 0 |
| 16 | MF | (Venezuela) | Leenhan Romero | 4 | 0 | 4 | 0 | 0 | 0 | 0 | 0 |
| 17 | DF | (Chile) | Gary Medel | 27 | 0 | 22 | 0 | 5 | 0 | 0 | 0 |
| 18 | FW | (Venezuela) | Eduard Bello | 31 | 7 | 26 | 6 | 4 | 1 | 1 | 0 |
| 19 | DF | (Chile) | Branco Ampuero | 35 | 1 | 29 | 1 | 5 | 0 | 1 | 0 |
| 20 | MF | (Colombia) | Jhojan Valencia | 35 | 0 | 28 | 0 | 6 | 0 | 1 | 0 |
| 21 | DF | (Chile) | Dylan Escobar | 12 | 0 | 7 | 0 | 4 | 0 | 1 | 0 |
| 22 | MF | (Chile) | Alfred Canales | 33 | 1 | 26 | 1 | 6 | 0 | 1 | 0 |
| 25 | MF | (Argentina) | Agustín Farías | 19 | 0 | 15 | 0 | 3 | 0 | 1 | 0 |
| 27 | GK | (Chile) | Darío Melo | 1 | 1 | 0 | 0 | 1 | 1 | 0 | 0 |
| 28 | FW | (Chile) | Francisco Arancibia † | 6 | 0 | 2 | 0 | 4 | 0 | 0 | 0 |
| 29 | FW | (Chile) | Axel Cerda | 4 | 0 | 3 | 0 | 1 | 0 | 0 | 0 |
| 30 | FW | (Chile) | Diego Valencia | 29 | 3 | 25 | 3 | 3 | 0 | 1 | 0 |
| 35 | FW | (Chile) | Diego Corral | 25 | 2 | 20 | 1 | 4 | 1 | 1 | 0 |
| 33 | MF | (Chile) | Nicolás Letelier | 3 | 0 | 2 | 0 | 1 | 0 | 0 | 0 |
| 44 | DF | (Chile) | José Ignacio Salas | 2 | 0 | 2 | 0 | 0 | 0 | 0 | 0 |
| 46 | MF | (Chile) | Vicente Cárcamo | 3 | 0 | 3 | 0 | 0 | 0 | 0 | 0 |

Last updated: 26 October 2025
Source: Soccerway

^{†} Player left Universidad Católica during the season

=== Goals ===
| Rank | No. | Pos. | Nat. | Player | League | Copa Chile | Copa Sudamericana | Total |
|---|---|---|---|---|---|---|---|---|
| 1 | 9 | FW | (Argentina) | Fernando Zampedri | 16 | 1 | 1 | 18 |
| 2 | 18 | FW | (Venezuela) | Eduard Bello | 6 | 1 | 0 | 7 |
| 3 | 11 | FW | (Chile) | Clemente Montes | 6 | 0 | 0 | 6 |
| 4 | 7 | FW | (Brazil) | Jader Gentil † | 2 | 1 | 0 | 3 |
| = | 30 | FW | (Chile) | Diego Valencia | 3 | 0 | 0 | 3 |
| 6 | 8 | MF | (Argentina) | Fernando Zuqui | 1 | 1 | 0 | 2 |
| = | 35 | FW | (Chile) | Diego Corral | 1 | 1 | 0 | 2 |
| = | 2 | DF | (Chile) | Daniel González | 1 | 1 | 0 | 2 |
| = | 14 | FW | (Chile) | Juan Francisco Rossel | 1 | 1 | 0 | 2 |
| = | 15 | MF | (Chile) | Cristián Cuevas | 2 | 0 | 0 | 2 |
| 11 | 7 | DF | (Chile) | Tomás Asta-Buruaga | 1 | 0 | 0 | 1 |
| = | 19 | DF | (Chile) | Branco Ampuero | 1 | 0 | 0 | 1 |
| = | 3 | DF | (Chile) | Eugenio Mena | 1 | 0 | 0 | 1 |
| = | 22 | MF | (Chile) | Alfred Canales | 1 | 0 | 0 | 1 |
| = | | | | Own goal | 1 | 0 | 0 | 1 |
| Total | | | | | 44 | 7 | 1 | 52 |

- Last updated: 6 December 2025
- Source: Soccerway

=== Penalty kicks ===
Includes only penalty kicks taken during matches.

| Rank | No. | Pos. | Nat. | Player | League | Copa Chile | Copa Sudamericana | Total |
|---|---|---|---|---|---|---|---|---|
| 1 | 9 | FW | (Argentina) | Fernando Zampedri | 6 / 7 | 1 / 1 | 0 / 0 | 7 / 8 |
| = | 30 | FW | (Chile) | Diego Valencia | 1 / 1 | 0 / 0 | 0 / 0 | 1 / 1 |
| Total | | | | | 7 / 8 | 1 / 1 | 0 / 0 | 8 / 9 |

- Last updated: 6 December 2025
- Source: Soccerway

=== Assists ===
| Rank | No. | Pos. | Nat. | Player | League | Copa Chile | Copa Sudamericana | Total |
|---|---|---|---|---|---|---|---|---|
| 1 | 20 | MF | (Colombia) | Jhojan Valencia | 7 | 0 | 0 | 7 |
| 2 | 9 | FW | (Argentina) | Fernando Zampedri | 3 | 0 | 0 | 3 |
| = | 3 | DF | (Chile) | Eugenio Mena | 3 | 0 | 0 | 3 |
| = | = | FW | (Venezuela) | Eduard Bello | 2 | 1 | 0 | 3 |
| 5 | 15 | MF | (Chile) | Cristián Cuevas | 1 | 0 | 1 | 2 |
| = | 21 | DF | (Chile) | Dylan Escobar | 0 | 2 | 0 | 2 |
| = | 22 | MF | (Chile) | Alfred Canales | 2 | 0 | 0 | 2 |
| = | 30 | FW | (Chile) | Diego Valencia | 2 | 0 | 0 | 2 |
| = | 6 | DF | (Chile) | Sebastián Arancibia | 2 | 0 | 0 | 2 |
| = | 11 | FW | (Chile) | Clemente Montes | 2 | 0 | 0 | 2 |
| 11 | 23 | DF | (Chile) | Tomás Asta-Buruaga | 1 | 0 | 0 | 1 |
| = | 7 | FW | (Brazil) | Jader Gentil † | 1 | 0 | 0 | 1 |
| Total | | | | | 26 | 3 | 1 | 30 |

- Last updated: 6 December 2025
- Source: Soccerway

=== Clean sheets ===
| Rank | No. | Pos. | Nat. | Name | League | Copa Chile | Copa Sudamericana | Total |
|---|---|---|---|---|---|---|---|---|
| 1 | 1 | GK | (Chile) | Vicente Bernedo | 11 / 30 | 0 / 3 | 0 / 1 | 11 / 34 |
| 2 | 13 | GK | (Chile) | Thomas Gillier | 0 / 0 | 1 / 2 | 0 / 0 | 1 / 2 |
| 3 | 27 | GK | (Chile) | Darío Melo | 0 / 0 | 0 / 1 | 0 / 0 | 0 / 1 |
| Total | | | | | 11 / 30 | 1 / 6 | 0 / 1 | 12 / 37 |

- Last updated: 6 December 2025
- Source: Soccerway

=== Penalty kick saves ===
Includes only penalty kicks saves during matches.

| Rank | No. | Pos. | Nat. | Player | League | Copa Chile | Copa Sudamericana | Total |
|---|---|---|---|---|---|---|---|---|
| 1 | 1 | GK | (Chile) | Vicente Bernedo | 0 / 6 | 0 / 2 | 0 / 0 | 0 / 8 |
| Total | | | | | 0 / 6 | 0 / 2 | 0 / 0 | 0 / 8 |

- Last updated: 6 December 2025
- Source: Soccerway
