= 2024 Club Deportivo Universidad Católica season =

84th season in existence of Club Deportivo Universidad Católica

Universidad Católica
2024 season
- President: Juan Tagle
- Head coach: Nicolás Núñez (until 7 March); Rodrigo Valenzuela (interim, 8 to 22 March); Tiago Nunes (from 22 March)
- Stadium: Estadio Santa Laura
- League: 5th
- Copa Chile: Regional stage
- Sudamericana: First stage
- Top goalscorer: League: Fernando Zampedri (19); All: Fernando Zampedri (19)
- Highest home attendance: 14,091 v. Universidad de Chile; League, 19 October 2024
- Lowest home attendance: 6,520 v. Audax Italiano; League, 17 March 2024
- Average home league attendance: 9,667
- Biggest win: 4–0 v. Huachipato (H); League, 25 August 2024
- Biggest defeat: 2–4 v. Everton (H); League, 11 March 2024
Home colours	Away colours
- All statistics correct as of 15 December 2024.

The 2024 Club Deportivo Universidad Católica season was the 84th season and the club's 50th consecutive season in the top flight of Chilean football. In addition to the domestic league, Universidad Católica also competed in the Copa Chile and the Copa Sudamericana.

== Squad ==
As of December 2024

No.	Player	Nationality	Position	Date of birth (age)	Year signed	Signed from
Goalkeepers
1	Vicente Bernedo	(Chile)	GK	22 January 2001 (age 23)	2024	Cobreloa
14	Thomas Gillier	(Chile)	GK	28 May 2004 (age 20)	2025	Academy
25	Sebastián Pérez	(Chile)	GK	2 December 1990 (age 34)	2024	Unión Española
Defenders
3	Eugenio Mena	(Chile)	LB	18 July 1988 (age 36)	2024	Racing Club
12	Guillermo Soto	(Chile)	LB / RB	19 January 1994 (age 30)	2026	Baltika Kaliningrad
5	Daniel González	(Chile)	CB	20 February 2002 (age 22)	2025	Santiago Wanderers
8	Valber Huerta	(Chile)	CB	26 August 1993 (age 31)	2026	Deportivo Toluca
15	Cristián Cuevas	(Chile)	AM / CM / RB	2 April 1995 (age 29)	2023	Huachipato
17	Branco Ampuero	(Chile)	CB	19 July 1993 (age 31)	2023	Deportes Antofagasta
22	Gary Kagelmacher	(Uruguay)	CB	21 April 1988 (age 36)	2024	León
24	Alfonso Parot	(Chile)	LB / RB	15 October 1989 (age 35)	2024	Rosario Central
34	Ignacio Pérez	(Chile)	CB	6 June 2006 (age 18)	2027	Academy
Midfielders
6	Alfred Canales	(Chile)	AM	27 April 2000 (age 24)	2026	Magallanes
7	Joaquín Torres	(Argentina)	AM	28 January 1997 (age 27)	2024	Philadelphia Union
10	César Pinares	(Chile)	AM / CM	23 May 1991 (age 33)	2024	Colo-Colo
14	Agustín Farías	(Argentina) (Chile)	CM	25 December 1987 (age 37)	2025	Palestino
18	Fernando Zuqui	(Argentina)	CM	27 November 1991 (age 33)	2026	Estudiantes
19	Bryan González	(Chile)	AM / CM	23 February 2003 (age 21)	2025	Academy
21	Diego Corral	(Chile)	RW	9 March 2005 (age 19)	2026	Academy
27	Jorge Ortiz	(Chile)	AM / CM	23 January 2004 (age 20)	2026	Academy
32	Leenhan Romero	(Venezuela)	AM	1 November 2006 (age 19)	2026	Academy
35	Juan Francisco Rossel	(Chile)	RW / LW	17 March 2005 (age 19)	2026	Academy
Forwards
9	Fernando Zampedri (captain)	(Argentina) (Chile)	ST	14 February 1988 (age 36)	2025	Rosario Central
11	Clemente Montes	(Chile)	RW / LW	25 April 2001 (age 23)	2024	Celta de Vigo B
13	Axel Cerda	(Chile)	ST	13 April 2006 (age 18)	2025	Academy
20	Gonzalo Tapia	(Chile)	RW	18 February 2002 (age 22)	2024	Academy
30	Nicolás Castillo	(Chile)	ST	14 February 1993 (age 22)	2024	Necaxa
31	Milan Tudor	(Chile)	ST	5 January 2004 (age 21)	2026	Academy
42	Bastián Gómez	(Chile)	ST	20 October 1996 (age 18)	2026	Academy
43	Francisco Arancibia	(Chile)	RW / LW	12 November 1996 (age 28)	2025	Cobreloa
44	Jader Gentil	(Brazil)	ST	24 July 2003 (age 21)	2025	Athletico Paranaense
Player(s) transferred out during this season
8	Lucas Menossi	(Argentina)	ST	11 July 1992 (age 31)	2024	Tigre
18	Alexander Aravena	(Chile)	ST	6 September 2002 (age 21)	2025	Ñublense
Player(s) on loan during this season
45	Ousman Touray	(United States)	ST	8 February 2003 (age 21)	2025	Academy

== Contracts and transfers ==
=== New contracts ===
Date	Pos.	Name	Contract length	Contract ends	Ref.
29 November 2023	DF	(Chile) Alfonso Parot	1-year	2024	
12 December 2023	DF	(Chile) Cristián Cuevas	1-year	2024	
12 December 2023	DF	(Chile) Branco Ampuero	1-year	2024	
2 February 2024	DF	(Chile) Ignacio Pérez	3-year	2026	
5 February 2024	MF	(Chile) Joan Orellana	3-year	2026	
24 August 2024	GK	(Chile) Martín Contreras	3-year	2026	

=== Transfers in ===
Date	Pos.	Name	From	Type	Ref.
12 December 2023	GK	(Chile) Sebastián Pérez	Unión Española	End of loan	
25 December 2023	MF	(Chile) Alfred Canales	Audax Italiano	Transfer	
29 December 2023	MF	(Argentina) Agustín Farías	Palestino	Free transfer	
31 December 2023	MF	(Chile) Ian Toro	Deportes Copiapó	End of loan	
1 January 2024	DF	(Venezuela) Aaron Astudillo	Deportes Recoleta	End of loan	
4 January 2024	FW	(Chile) Nicolás Castillo		Free transfer	
13 January 2024	MF	(Argentina) Lucas Menossi	(Argentina) Tigre	Free transfer	
13 January 2024	DF	(Chile) Guillermo Soto	(Russia) Baltika Kaliningrad	Transfer	
11 June 2024	DF	(Chile) Valber Huerta	(Mexico) Deportivo Toluca	Free transfer	
17 July 2024	MF	(Argentina) Fernando Zuqui	(Argentina) Estudiantes	Free transfer	
26 July 2024	FW	(Chile) Francisco Arancibia	Cobreloa	Transfer	

=== Transfers out ===
Date	Pos.	Name	From	Type	Ref.
27 November 2023	MF	(Colombia) Bryan Rovira	(Colombia) Atlético Nacional	End of loan	
10 December 2023	DF	(Argentina) Guillermo Burdisso	(Argentina) Huracán	Contract terminated	
11 December 2023	GK	(Argentina) Nicolás Peranic	O'Higgins	Contract terminated	
11 December 2023	DF	(Chile) Byron Nieto	Deportes Antofagasta	End of loan	
11 December 2023	FW	(Argentina) Franco Di Santo	(Argentina) Rivadavia	Buyout clause	
22 December 2023	MF	(Chile) Ignacio Saavedra	(Russia) Sochi	Contract terminated	
31 December 2023	DF	(Chile) Cristóbal Finch	(Croatia) Omladinac Gornja	Contract terminated	
7 January 2024	DF	(Chile) Ignacio Novoa	Lautaro de Buin	Contract terminated	
7 January 2024	MF	(Chile) Benjamín Iglesias	Lautaro de Buin	Contract terminated	
26 January 2024	DF	(Argentina) Nehuén Paz	(Argentina) Rivadavia	Buyout clause	
3 February 2024	FW	(Chile) Diego Ossa	(United States) SLCC Bruins	Buyout clause	
17 June 2024	MF	(Argentina) Lucas Menossi	(Argentina) Belgrano	Buyout clause	
14 July 2024	FW	(Chile) Alexander Aravena	(Brazil) Grêmio	Transfer	

=== Loans in ===
Date	Pos.	Name	From	End date	Ref.
22 February 2024	MF	(Argentina) Joaquín Torres	(United States) Philadelphia Union	End of season	
9 August 2024	FW	(Brazil) Jader Gentil	(Portugal) Santa Clara	End of season	

=== Loans out ===
Date	Pos.	Name	From	End date	Ref.
7 January 2024	MF	(Chile) Juan Leiva	Cobreloa	End of season	
8 January 2024	FW	(Chile) Luis Hernández	Deportes Copiapó	End of season	
8 January 2024	DF	(Chile) Tomás Asta-Buruaga	Everton	End of season	
31 January 2024	DF	(Chile) Luis Muñoz	Fernández Vial	End of season	
3 February 2024	DF	(Chile) Carlos Navarrete	Cobresal	End of season	
3 February 2024	DF	(Chile) Carlos Arancibia	Trasandino	End of season	
3 February 2024	MF	(Chile) Sergio Cabello	San Antonio Unido	End of season	
3 February 2024	MF	(Chile) Marcelo Pérez	San Antonio Unido	End of season	
5 February 2024	MF	(Chile) Joan Orellana	(Brazil) Flamengo Sub-20	End of season	
18 March 2024	DF	(Chile) Carlos Salomón	Barnechea	End of season	
12 July 2024	FW	(United States) Ousman Touray	(Panama) Herrera FC	End of season	

== Competitions ==
=== Overview ===
Competition	First match	Last match	Starting round	Final position	Record							
Competition	First match	Last match	Starting round	Final position	Pld	W	D	L	GF	GA	GD	Win %
League	23 February 2024	9 November 2024	Matchday 1	5th	30	13	7	10	44	34	+10	43.33
Copa Chile	20 June 2024	29 June 2024	Regional stage	Regional stage	3	1	1	1	4	3	+1	33.33
Copa Sudamericana	5 March 2024	5 March 2024	First stage	First stage	1	0	0	1	0	2	−2	0.00
Total					34	14	8	12	48	39	+9	41.18

Last updated: December 2024
Source: Soccerway

=== Primera Division ===
==== League table ====
Pos	Team	Pld	W	D	L	GF	GA	GD	Pts	Qualification or relegation
3	Deportes Iquique	30	14	6	10	53	48	+5	48	Qualification for Copa Libertadores second stage
4	Palestino	30	13	7	10	46	33	+13	46	Qualification for Copa Sudamericana first stage
5	Universidad Católica	30	13	7	10	44	34	+10	46	Qualification for Copa Sudamericana first stage
6	Unión Española	30	13	6	11	53	45	+8	45	Qualification for Copa Sudamericana first stage
7	Everton	30	12	9	9	47	41	+6	45	Qualification for Copa Sudamericana first stage

Source: ANFP, Soccerway
Rules for classification: 1) Points, 2) Playoff game (only if needed to decide championship between two teams), 3) Goal difference, 4) Matches won, 5) Goals for, 6) Away goals for, 7) Red cards, 8) Yellow cards, 9) Drawing of lots.

==== Results summary ====
Overall								Home						Away					
Pld	W	D	L	GF	GA	GD	Pts	W	D	L	GF	GA	GD	W	D	L	GF	GA	GD
30	13	7	10	44	34	+10	46	6	3	6	26	19	+7	7	4	4	18	15	+3

Source: Primera Division

==== Results by round ====
Round	1	2	3	4	5	6	7	8	9	10	11	12	13	14	15	16	17	18	19	20	21	22	23	24	25	26	27	28	29	30
Ground	A	H	A	H	H	A	H	A	H	A	A	H	A	H	A	H	A	H	A	A	H	A	H	A	H	H	A	H	A	HA
Result	D	L	W	L	D	D	W	W	L	W	W	W	W	W	L	W	W	D	D	L	W	L	D	L	W	L	W	L	D	D
Position	12	14	10	12	12	12	11	7	10	7	5	5	4	3	3	3	3	3	2	3	3	3	3	3	3	3	3	4	3	5

Updated to match(es) played on incomplete. Source: Primera Division
A = Away; H = Home; W = Win; D = Draw; L = Loss

==== Matches ====
22 March 2024 1	Unión La Calera	0:0	Universidad Católica	La Calera
		Report		Stadium: Nicolás Chahuán; Attendance: 2.341; Referee: Juan Lara

23 February 2024 2	Universidad Católica	0:1	Ñublense	Independencia
		Report	Rubio 58'	Stadium: Santa Laura; Attendance: 7.328; Referee: Diego Flores

2 March 2024 3	Palestino	0:2	Universidad Católica	La Cisterna
		Report	Aravena 38'; Zampedri 89' (pen.)	Stadium: Municipal; Attendance: 2.449; Referee: Miguel Araos

11 March 2024 4	Universidad Católica	2:4	Everton	Independencia
	Aravena 13'; Castillo 90+6'	Report	Asta-Buruaga 16'; B. Martínez 21'; F. Martínez 59'; Berríos 78'	Stadium: Santa Laura; Attendance: 7.293; Referee: Benjamín Saravia

17 March 2024 5	Universidad Católica	0:0	Audax Italiano	Independencia
		Report		Stadium: Santa Laura; Attendance: 6.520; Referee: Piero Maza

30 March 2024 6	Huachipato	0:0	Universidad Católica	Talcahuano
		Report		Stadium: Huachipato; Attendance: 4.116; Referee: Rodrigo Carvajal

6 April 2024 7	Universidad Católica	2:0	Cobresal	Independencia
	Tapia 2'; Zampedri 29'	Report		Stadium: Santa Laura; Attendance: 8.276; Referee: Héctor Jona

13 April 2024 8	Deportes Iquique	2:3	Universidad Católica	Iquique
	Pino 33'; Puch 60'	Report	Tapia 16'; Zampedri 38'; Castillo 90+1'	Stadium: Tierra de Campeones; Attendance: 11.208; Referee: Mario Salvo

20 April 2024 9	Universidad Católica	0:1	Colo-Colo	Independencia
		Report	Vidal 23'	Stadium: Santa Laura; Attendance: 12.008; Referee: Héctor Jona

27 April 2024 10	Deportes Copiapó	0:1	Universidad Católica	Copiapó
		Report	Tapia 76'	Stadium: Luis Valenzuela; Attendance: 3.599; Referee: José Cabero

4 May 2024 11	Unión Española	1:2	Universidad Católica	Independencia
	Adamo 88'	Report	Montes 57'; Zampedri 65'	Stadium: Santa Laura; Referee: Francisco Gilabert

11 May 2024 12	Universidad Católica	3:2	O'Higgins	Independencia
	Menos si 12'; Zampedri 14', 18'	Report	Kagelmacher 38' (o.g.); Ogaz 85'	Stadium: Santa Laura; Attendance: 7.465; Referee: Mathías Riquelme

18 May 2024 13	Universidad de Chile	1:2	Universidad Católica	Ñuñoa
	Fernández 8'	Report	Aravena 22'; Zampedri 60'	Stadium: Nacional; Attendance: 45.000; Referee: Cristián Garay

25 May 2024 14	Universidad Católica	4:1	Cobreloa	Independencia
	Zampedri 34' (pen.), 52'; Tapia 55', 64'	Report	García 13'	Stadium: Santa Laura; Attendance: 11.597; Referee: Benjamín Saravia

2 June 2024 15	Coquimbo Unido	2:0	Universidad Católica	Coquimbo
	Glaby 16'; S. Cabrera 45'	Report		Stadium: Francisco Sánchez; Referee: Rodrigo Carvajal

20 July 2024 16	Universidad Católica	2:0	Unión La Calera	Independencia
	Zampedri 16', 75' (pen.)	Report		Stadium: Santa Laura; Attendance: 7.563; Referee: Cristián Garay

28 July 2024 17	Ñublense	1:2	Universidad Católica	Chillán
	Oyarzo 61'	Report	Tapia 38'; Zampedri 90+10' (pen.)	Stadium: Nelson Oyarzún; Referee: Juan Lara

3 August 2024 18	Universidad Católica	1:1	Palestino	Independencia
	Rossel 82'	Report	Dávila 78'	Stadium: Santa Laura; Attendance: 9.196; Referee: Mathías Riquelme

11 August 2024 19	Everton	0:0	Universidad Católica	Viña del Mar
		Report		Stadium: Sausalito; Attendance: 7.824; Referee: José Cabero

18 August 2024 20	Audax Italiano	2:1	Universidad Católica	Rancagua
	Jeraldino 57', 62' (pen.)	Report	Zampedri 70' (pen.)	Stadium: El Teniente; Attendance: 2.735; Referee: Manuel Vergara

25 August 2024 21	Universidad Católica	4:0	Huachipato	Independencia
	González 26'; Tapia 36'; Cuevas 77'; Zampedri 80'	Report		Stadium: Santa Laura; Attendance: 8.371; Referee: Juan Lara

28 August 2024 22	Cobresal	3:1	Universidad Católica	El Salvador
	Céspedes 5'; Vilches 57'; Lezcano 90+3'	Report	Zampedri 44' (pen.)	Stadium: El Cobre; Referee: Héctor Jona

31 August 2024 23	Universidad Católica	2:2	Deportes Iquique	Independencia
	Tapia 48'; Ampuero 50'	Report	Carvallo 18'; Hoyos 45+1'	Stadium: Santa Laura; Attendance: 9 143; Referee: Felipe González Alveal

3 October 2024 24	Colo-Colo	1:0	Universidad Católica	Macul
	Correa 86'	Report		Stadium: Monumental; Referee: José Cabero

25 September 2024 25	Universidad Católica	4:1	Deportes Copiapó	La Florida
	Canales 45+4'; Montes 63'; Zampedri 89'; Tapia 90+3'	Report	Quinteros 2'	Stadium: Bicentenario; Attendance: 6.507; Referee: Héctor Jona

29 September 2024 26	Universidad Católica	0:2	Unión Española	La Florida
		Report	Uribe 63'; González 74'	Stadium: Bicentenario; Attendance: 9.522; Referee: Fernando Véjar

6 October 2024 27	O'Higgins	0:2	Universidad Católica	Rancagua
		Report	Ampuero 21'; Gentil 47'	Stadium: El Teniente; Attendance: 6.273; Referee: Gastón Philippe

19 October 2024 28	Universidad Católica	1:2	Universidad de Chile	Independencia
	Zampedri 40'	Report	Aránguiz 65'; Zaldivia 80'	Stadium: Santa Laura; Attendance: 14.091; Referee: Cristián Garay

2 November 2024 29	Cobreloa	2:2	Universidad Católica	Calama, Chile
	Insaurralde 11'; Parraguez 18'	Report	Ampuero 8'; Zampedri 20'	Stadium: Zorros del Desierto; Attendance: 6.875; Referee: Francisco Gilabert

9 November 2024 30	Universidad Católica	1:2	Coquimbo Unido	Independencia
	Zampedri 84'	Report	Henríquez 44'; Chávez 69'	Stadium: Santa Laura; Attendance: 10.458; Referee: Juan Lara

=== Copa Chile ===
==== Central–North Zone ====
===== Round of 16 =====
23 June 2024	Santiago Wanderers	1–0	Universidad Católica	Valparaíso
15:00 UTC−4	Valenzuela 90+6'	Report		Stadium: Elías Figueroa Brander; Referee: Benjamín Saravia

===== Round of 16 =====
23 June 2024	Santiago Wanderers	1–0	Universidad Católica	Valparaíso
15:00 UTC−4	Valenzuela 90+6'	Report		Stadium: Elías Figueroa Brander; Referee: Benjamín Saravia

=== Copa Sudamericana ===
The draw for the first stage was held on 19 December 2023, 12:00 PYST (UTC−3), at the CONMEBOL Convention Centre in Luque, Paraguay.

==== First stage ====
5 March 2024	Universidad Católica (Chile)	0–2	(Chile) Coquimbo Unido	Estadio Ester Roa, Concepción (Note: Universidad Católica played their home match at Estadio Ester Roa, Concepción (originally scheduled at Estadio Nacional Julio Martínez Prádanos, Santiago) instead of their regular stadium Estadio San Carlos de Apoquindo, Santiago which was being rebuilt.)
19:00 UTC−3		Report	Canales 52' (o.g.); Johansen 87' (pen.)	Attendance: 9,009; Referee: Bráulio Machado (Brazil)

== Statistics ==
=== Goals ===
Rank	No.	Nat.	Player	League	Copa Chile	Copa Sudamericana	Total
1	9	(Argentina)	Fernando Zampedri	19	0	0	19
2	20	(Chile)	Gonzalo Tapia	9	2	0	11
3	18	(Chile)	Alexander Aravena	3	0	0	3
4	17	(Chile)	Branco Ampuero	3	0	0	3
4	30	(Chile)	Nicolás Castillo	2	0	0	2
4	11	(Chile)	Clemente Montes	2	0	0	2
4	6	(Chile)	Alfred Canales	1	1	0	2
5	35	(Chile)	Juan Francisco Rossel	1	0	0	1
5	10	(Chile)	César Pinares	0	1	0	1
5	5	(Chile)	Daniel González	1	0	0	1
5	44	(Brazil)	Jader Gentil	1	0	0	1
5	15	(Chile)	Cristián Cuevas	1	0	0	1
5	8	(Argentina)	Lucas Menossi	1	0	0	1
Total				44	4	0	48

- Last updated: December 2024
- Source: Soccerway

=== Assists ===
Rank	No.	Nat.	Player	League	Copa Chile	Copa Sudamericana	Total
1	15	(Chile)	Cristián Cuevas	6	0	0	6
2	18	(Argentina)	Fernando Zuqui	4	0	0	4
2	20	(Chile)	Gonzalo Tapia	4	0	0	4
3	3	(Chile)	Eugenio Mena	3	0	0	3
3	10	(Chile)	César Pinares	3	0	0	3
4	9	(Argentina)	Fernando Zampedri	2	0	0	2
4	4	(Chile)	Guillermo Soto	1	1	0	2
4	11	(Chile)	Clemente Montes	1	1	0	2
5	32	(Venezuela)	Leenhan Romero	1	0	0	1
5	17	(Chile)	Branco Ampuero	1	0	0	1
5	7	(Argentina)	Joaquín Torres	1	0	0	1
5	44	(Brazil)	Jader Gentil	1	0	0	1
5	5	(Chile)	Daniel González	1	0	0	1
5	8	(Argentina)	Lucas Menossi	1	0	0	1
5	18	(Chile)	Alexander Aravena	1	0	0	1
Total				31	2	0	33

*Last updated: December 2024
- Source: Soccerway

=== Clean sheets ===
Rank	No.	Pos.	Nat.	Name	League	C. Chile	Copa Sudamericana	Total
1	14	GK	(Chile)	Thomas Gillier	6	1	0	7
2	25	GK	(Chile)	Sebastián Pérez	4	1	0	5
Total					10	2	0	12

- Last updated: December 2024
- Source: Soccerway
