= Axel Cerda =

Chilean footballer

Personal information
- Full name: Axel Milovan Cerda Ponce
- Date of birth: 13 April 2006 (age 20)
- Place of birth: Santiago, Chile
- Height: 1.80 m (5 ft 11 in)
- Position: Striker

Team information
- Current team: Concón National (on loan from Universidad Católica)
- Number: 21

Youth career
- Universidad Católica

Senior career*
Years	Team	Apps	(Gls)
2023–	Universidad Católica	4	(0)
2026–	→ Concón National (loan)	2	(0)

International career^{‡}
2023	Chile U17	5	(0)
- * Club domestic league appearances and goals as of 5 April 2026 ‡ National team caps and goals as of 11 October 2022

Axel Milovan Cerda Ponce (born 14 April 2004) is a Chilean professional footballer who plays as a striker for Concón National on loan from Universidad Católica.

== Club career ==
A product of Universidad Católica, Cerda made his professional debut against Ñublense on 6 August 2022 In 2026, he was loaned out to Concón National in the Segunda División Profesional de Chile.

== International career ==
Cerda represented Chile at under-17 level in the 2023 South American U-17 Championship.

== Personal life ==
He is the nephew of the goalkeeper Fabián Cerda.

== Career statistics ==
=== Club ===
As of 9 october 2025

Appearances and goals by club, season and competition
Club	Season	League			Cup (Note: Includes Copa Chile)		League cup (Note: Includes Copa de la Liga)		Continental		Other		Total	
Club	Season	Division	Apps	Goals	Apps	Goals	Apps	Goals	Apps	Goals	Apps	Goals	Apps	Goals
Universidad Católica	2023	Primera División	1	0	—		—		—		—		1	0
Universidad Católica	2024	Primera División	—		—		—		—		—		0	0
Universidad Católica	2025	Primera División	3	0	1	0	—		—		—		4	0
Universidad Católica	Total		4	0	1	0	—		0	0	0	0	5	0
Career total			4	0	1	0	—		0	0	0	0	5	0
