= Diego Céspedes =

Diego Céspedes may refer to:

- Diego Céspedes (director) (born 1995), Chilean film director and screenwriter
- Diego Céspedes (footballer) (born 1998), Chilean footballer
