= Branco Ampuero =

Chilean footballer (born 1993)

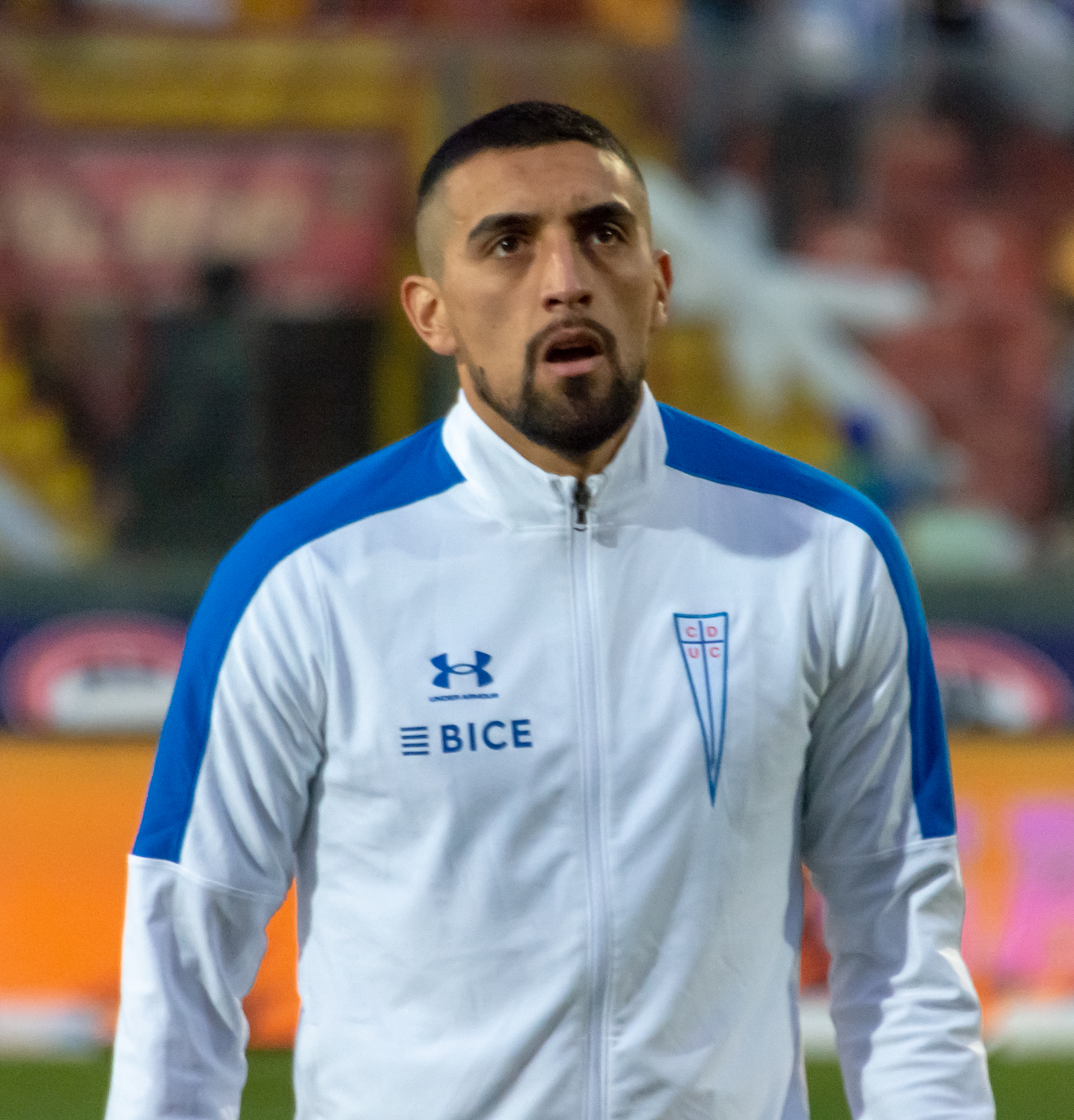
- Ampuero in 2023

Personal information
- Full name: Erwin Branco Ampuero Vera
- Date of birth: 19 July 1993 (age 33)
- Place of birth: Carelmapu, Chile
- Height: 1.82 m (6 ft 0 in)
- Position: Centre-back

Team information
- Current team: Universidad Católica
- Number: 19

Youth career
- –2010: Deportes Puerto Montt

Senior career*
Years	Team	Apps	(Gls)
2010–2014	Deportes Puerto Montt	79	(6)
2014–2021	Deportes Antofagasta	115	(3)
2017–2018	→ Universidad Católica (loan)	27	(0)
2021–	Universidad Católica	95	(3)

International career^{‡}
2017–	Chile	2	(0)
- * Club domestic league appearances and goals as of 6 July 2025 ‡ National team caps and goals as of 8 February 2025

Erwin Branco Ampuero Vera (Spanish pronunciation: [ˈbɾaŋko amˈpweɾo]; born 19 July 1993), known as Branco Ampuero, is a Chilean professional footballer who plays for Chilean club Universidad Católica as a centre-back.

== Club career ==
He made his professional debut in 2010 with Deportes Puerto Montt. His exceptional aerial ability secured him a consistent starting role in the majority of matches for the "Albiverdes." Driven by his significant potential and strong performances at Puerto Montt, Branco took a major step forward in mid-2014 when he was signed by Deportes Antofagasta. During this period, he maintained remarkable consistency and further refined his technical skills, establishing himself as one of the squad's core strengths.

=== Universidad Católica ===
On June 21, 2017, Universidad Católica officially announced the defender's arrival to the squad. Following the return of the season-long tournament format, he celebrated the 2018 Primera División title with the club.

Due to limited playing time with Universidad Católica, Ampuero was sent on loan to Deportes Antofagasta for the 2019 and 2020 seasons. Upon his return to the club in 2021, Ampuero achieved further success, winning the 2020 Supercopa, the 2021 Supercopa, and the 2021 Primera División championship.

Following his consistent performances for the club, Ampuero has regularly renewed his contract with Universidad Católica. At the start of the 2026 season, he signed a contract extension, securing his stay at the club through 2027.

== International career ==
He was called up by Chile's head coach, Juan Antonio Pizzi, for the 2017 China Cup friendly tournament held in January. He did not feature in the semifinal match against Croatia on January 11, which ended in a 1–1 draw before "La Roja" secured a 4–1 victory in a penalty shootout.

Four days later, he appeared in the tournament final, entering the pitch in the 91st minute as a substitute for Leonardo Valencia. Wearing the number 4 jersey, he participated in the match against Iceland, which Chile won 1–0 with a goal by Ángelo Sagal. With this victory, he and his team were crowned 2017 China Cup champions.

== Career statistics ==
=== Club ===
As of As of match played 21 June 2026

Appearances and goals by club, season and competition
Club	Season	League			National cup (Note: Includes Copa Chile)		League cup (Note: Includes Copa de la Liga)		Continental		Other		Total	
Club	Season	Division	Apps	Goals	Apps	Goals	Apps	Goals	Apps	Goals	Apps	Goals	Apps	Goals
Puerto Montt	2010	Primera B	4	1	—		—		—		—		4	1
Puerto Montt	2011	Primera B	11	0	3	1	—		—		—		14	1
Puerto Montt	2012	Primera B	24	0	3	0	—		—		—		27	0
Puerto Montt	2013	Segunda División	20	3	—		—		—		—		20	3
Puerto Montt	2013–14	Segunda División	20	2	—		—		—		—		20	2
Puerto Montt	Total		79	6	6	1	—		0	0	0	0	85	7
Deportes Antofagasta	2014-15	Primera División	21	0	6	0	—		—		—		27	0
Deportes Antofagasta	2015-16	Primera División	26	0	6	1	—		—		—		32	1
Deportes Antofagasta	2016-17	Primera División	25	2	—		—		—		—		25	2
Deportes Antofagasta	2019	Primera División	16	0	2	0	—		—		—		18	0
Deportes Antofagasta	2020	Primera División	27	1	—		—		—		—		27	1
Deportes Antofagasta	Total		115	3	14	1	—		0	0	0	0	129	4
Universidad Católica (loan)	2017	Primera División	11	0	1	0	—		—		—		12	0
Universidad Católica (loan)	2018	Primera División	16	0	2	0	—		—		—		18	0
Universidad Católica (loan)	Total		27	0	3	0	—		0	0	0	0	30	0
Universidad Católica	2020	Primera División	—		—		—		—		1 (Note: Appearance(s) in the Supercopa de Chile)	0	1	0
Universidad Católica	2021	Primera División	8	0	—		—		3 (Note: Appearance(s) in the Copa Libertadores)	0	1	0	12	0
Universidad Católica	2022	Primera División	21	0	6	1	—		4 (Note: 2 appearances in Copa Libertadores, 2 in Copa Sudamericana)	0	1	0	32	1
Universidad Católica	2023	Primera División	23	0	5	0	—		1 (Note: Appearances in Copa Sudamericana)	0	—		29	0
Universidad Católica	2024	Primera División	27	3	3	0	—		1	0	—		31	3
Universidad Católica	2025	Primera División	29	1	5	0	—		1	0	—		35	1
Universidad Católica	2026	Primera División	15	1	0	0	5	0	6	0	2	0	28	1
Universidad Católica	Total		123	5	19	1	5	0	16	0	5	0	168	6
Career total			344	14	42	3	5	0	16	0	5	0	412	17

=== International ===
As of match played 8 February 2025

Appearances and goals by national team and year
National team	Year	Apps	Goals
Chile	2017	1	0
Chile	2025	1	0
Total		2	0

== Honours ==
Deportes Puerto Montt

- Segunda División: 2018

Universidad Católica

- Primera División: 2018, 2021
- Supercopa de Chile: 2020, 2021

Chile

- China Cup: 2017
