= Eduardo Arancibia =

Chilean footballer (born 1976)

Personal information
- Full name: Eduardo Daniel Arancibia Unger
- Date of birth: 20 July 1976 (age 50)
- Place of birth: Santiago, Chile
- Height: 1.61 m (5 ft 3 in)
- Position: Midfielder

Senior career*
Years	Team	Apps	(Gls)
1998–2001	Universidad de Chile		
2001–2002	→ Atlas (loan)		
2001	León		
2002	Universidad Católica		
2003–2004	Unión Española		
2004–2005	Cobreloa		
2005	Rangers		
2006–2007	Universidad de Concepción		
2007–2008	Deportes Antofagasta		
2008–2009	Santiago Morning		
2009	San Luis		

International career
1999	Chile	1	(0)
- * Club domestic league appearances and goals

Eduardo Daniel Arancibia Unger (born 20 July 1976) is a Chilean former professional footballer who played as a midfielder.

== Career ==
Arancibia played in Mexico and Chilean giant clubs like Universidad de Chile and Universidad Católica.

At international level, he took part in a friendly match of the Chile national team against Alianza Lima on 11 November 1999, what was a 2–0 win, by replacing Claudio Maldonado.

== Personal life ==
He is a member of a football family nicknamed "Arancibia Dynasty" since his three brothers – Franz, Leopoldo and Roque – were professional footballers and his nephew Francisco, son of Leopoldo, is a professional footballer too. In addition, both his nephew Martín, son of his sister Marcela, and his son Maximiliano, were with the Palestino youth ranks.

Both Eduardo and his relatives, Franz and Francisco, have played for Universidad de Chile.

His father, Ramón Roque Arancibia, played football at amateur level in Renca, and his mother, Edith Unger, deceased in 2016 and of German descent, was who involved his children in football. His maternal grandfather, Franz Kramer Unger Smuk, also played football.

== Honours ==
Universidad de Chile

- Chilean Primera División: 1999, 2000
- Copa Chile: 1998, 2000

Universidad Católica

- Chilean Primera División: 2002–A

Cobreloa

- Chilean Primera División: 2003–C

San Luis de Quillota

- Primera B de Chile: 2009–C
