= Diego Corral =

Chilean footballer (born 2005)

Personal information
- Full name: Diego Corral Contreras
- Date of birth: 9 March 2005 (age 21)
- Place of birth: Santiago, Chile
- Height: 1.73 m (5 ft 8 in)
- Position: Striker

Team information
- Current team: Universidad Católica
- Number: 35

Youth career
- 2014–2023: Universidad Católica

Senior career*
Years	Team	Apps	(Gls)
2023–	Universidad Católica	9	(1)
- * Club domestic league appearances and goals as of 13 November 2021 ‡ National team caps and goals as of 11 October 2022

Diego Corral Contreras (born 9 March 2005) is a Chilean professional footballer who plays as a striker for Chilean club Universidad Católica.

== Club career ==
Growing up through the youth ranks of Universidad Católica. On 11 March 2023, Corral signedhis contract with Universidad Católica. Corral made his professional debut playing for Universidad Católica in a 2023 against Union Española on 31 August 2023.

On 11 February, 2025, Corral scored the first professional goal of his career in a Copa Chile group stage against Unión La Calera in a 2–2 away draw for Universidad Católica. On 6 July, 2025 he scored his first Liga de Primera for Universidad Católica, in a 2–0 win against Colo-Colo.

== Personal life ==
Corral is the nephew of the former Chile international footballer Jorge Contreras.

== Career statistics ==
=== Club ===
As of As of match played 21 June 2026

Appearances and goals by club, season and competition
Club	Season	League			National cup (Note: Includes Copa Chile)		League cup (Note: Includes Copa de la Liga)		Continental		Other		Total	
Club	Season	Division	Apps	Goals	Apps	Goals	Apps	Goals	Apps	Goals	Apps	Goals	Apps	Goals
Universidad Católica	2023	Primera División	2	0	—		—		—		—		2	0
Universidad Católica	2024	Primera División	—		—		—		—		—		0	0
Universidad Católica	2025	Primera División	20	1	4	1	—		1 (Note: Appearance in Copa Sudamericana)	0	—		25	2
Universidad Católica	2026	Primera División	8	1	1	0	4	2	2 (Note: Appearance(s) in the Copa Libertadores)	0	1 (Note: Appearance in Supercopa de Chile)	0	16	3
Universidad Católica	Total		30	2	5	1	4	2	3	0	1	0	43	5
Career total			30	2	5	1	4	2	3	0	1	0	43	5
