= Alfred Canales =

Chilean footballer (born 2000)

Personal information
- Full name: Alfred Jeafran Canales Céspedes
- Date of birth: 27 April 2000 (age 26)
- Place of birth: San Ramón, Santiago, Chile
- Height: 1.89 m (6 ft 2 in)
- Position: Midfielder

Team information
- Current team: Universidad Católica
- Number: 22

Youth career
- Audax Italiano

Senior career*
Years	Team	Apps	(Gls)
2020–2023	Audax Italiano	9	(0)
2021	→ Lautaro de Buin (loan)	10	(0)
2022	→ Universidad de Concepción (loan)	13	(3)
2023	→ Magallanes (loan)	28	(3)
2024–	Universidad Católica	33	(1)

International career^{‡}
2023	Chile U23	5	(0)
Medal record
Men's football
Representing Chile
Pan American Games
Silver medal – second place	2023 Santiago	Team
- * Club domestic league appearances and goals as of 6 July 2025 ‡ National team caps and goals as of 5 November 2023

Alfred Jeafran Canales Céspedes (born 27 April 2000) is a Chilean footballer who plays as a midfielder for Chilean Primera División side Universidad Católica.

== Club career ==
Born in San Ramón, Santiago de Chile, Canales is a product of the Audax Italiano youth system and made his professional debut against Cobresal on 25 January 2020. He spent two seasons on loan to Lautaro de Buin and Universidad de Concepción in 2021 and 2022, respectively.

In 2023, he joined on loan to Magallanes, then the champions of the Primera B and recent promoted club to the top division. He has taken part of a successful stint of them, winning the 2023 Supercopa de Chile versus Colo-Colo, the third consecutive title of the club, and playing at the Copa Libertadores and the Copa Sudamericana.

=== Universidad Católica ===
On 25 December 2023, Canales signed a contract with Universidad Católica until 2026.

== International career ==
Canales has taken part of training microcycles of the Chile under-23 team with the coach Eduardo Berizzo. He was included in the final squad for the 2023 Pan American Games, where Chile won the silver medal.

At senior level, he received his first call up for the 2026 FIFA World Cup qualifiers against Uruguay and Colombia in September 2023, alongside his teammate Julián Alfaro. He was called up by second time for the friendly against Panama on 8 February 2025.

== Career statistics ==
=== Club ===
As of As of match played 21 June 2026

Appearances and goals by club, season and competition
Club	Season	League			National cup (Note: Includes Copa Chile)		League cup (Note: Includes Copa de la Liga)		Continental		Other		Total	
Club	Season	Division	Apps	Goals	Apps	Goals	Apps	Goals	Apps	Goals	Apps	Goals	Apps	Goals
Audax Italiano	2020	Liga de Primera	9	0	—		—		1 (Note: Appearances in Copa Sudamericana)	0	—		10	0
Audax Italiano	2021	Liga de Primera	—		1	0	—		—		—		1	0
Audax Italiano	2022	Liga de Primera	—		1	0	—		—		—		1	0
Audax Italiano	Total		9	0	2	0	0	0	1	0	0	0	12	0
Lautaro de Buin (loan)	2021	Segunda División	10	0	—		—		—		—		10	0
Universidad de Concepción (loan)	2022	Liga de Ascenso	13	3	2	0	—		—		—		15	3
Magallanes (loan)	2023	Liga de Primera	28	3	6	1	—		8 (Note: 4 appearances in Copa Libertadores, 4 in Copa Sudamericana)	1	1 (Note: Appearance(s) in the Supercopa de Chile)	0	43	5
Universidad Católica	2024	Liga de Primera	21	1	3	1	—		1	0	—		25	2
Universidad Católica	2025	Liga de Primera	26	1	6	0	—		1	0	—		33	1
Universidad Católica	2026	Liga de Primera	7	0	0	1	6	1	1 (Note: Appearances in Copa Libertadores)	0	0	0	15	1
Universidad Católica	Total		54	2	9	2	6	1	3	0	0	0	73	4
Career total			114	8	19	3	6	1	12	1	1	0	153	12

== Honours ==
Magallanes

- Supercopa de Chile: 2023

Chile U23

- Pan American Games Silver Medal: 2023
