= Clemente Montes =

Chilean footballer (born 2001)

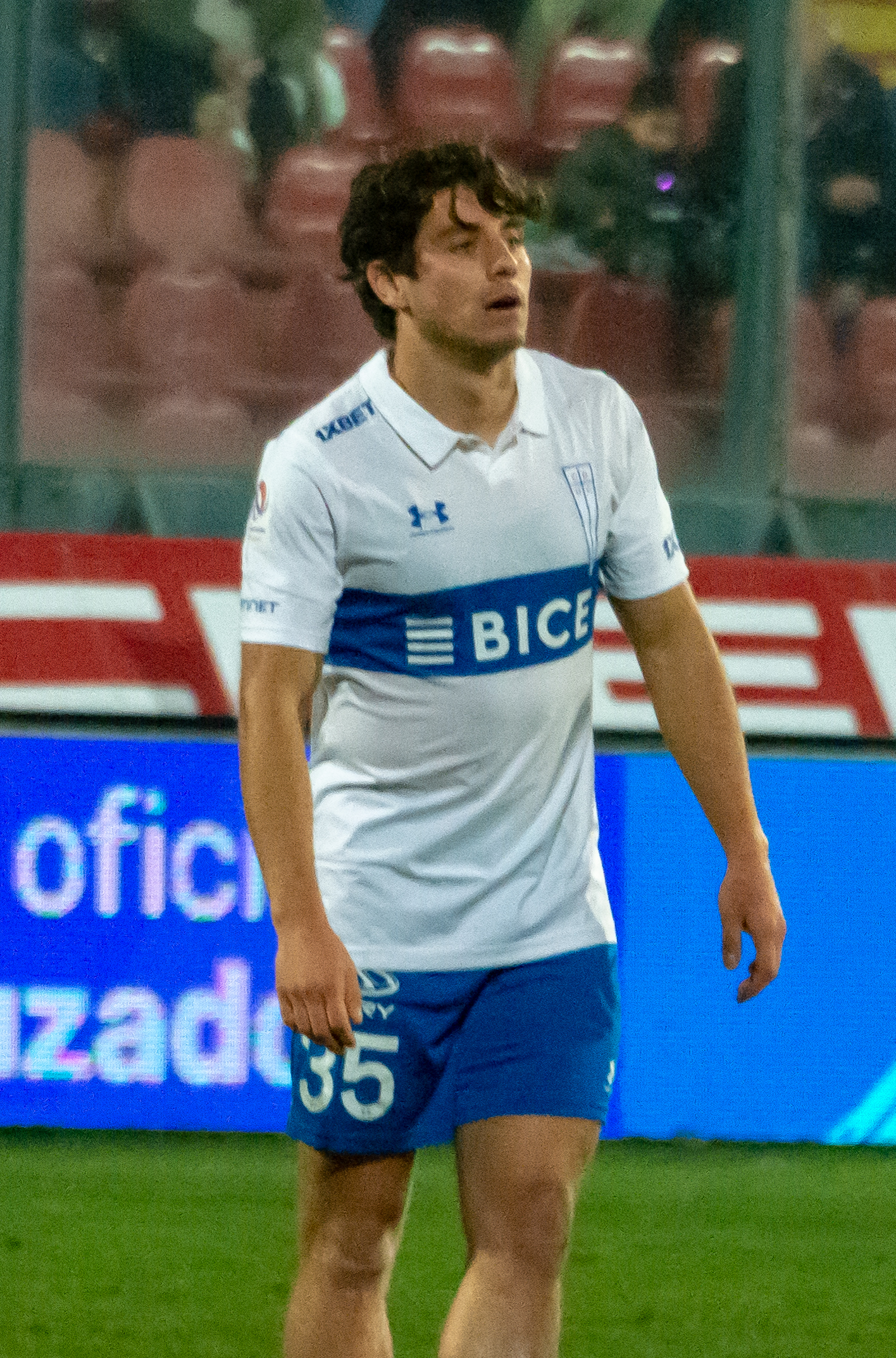
- Montes with Universidad Católica in 2023

Personal information
- Full name: Clemente José Montes Barroilhet
- Date of birth: 25 April 2001 (age 25)
- Place of birth: Vitacura, Chile
- Height: 1.78 m (5 ft 10 in)
- Position: Forward

Team information
- Current team: Universidad Católica
- Number: 11

Youth career
- 2010–2020: Universidad Católica

Senior career*
Years	Team	Apps	(Gls)
2020–	Universidad Católica	101	(13)
2023	→ Celta Vigo B (loan)	11	(1)

International career^{‡}
2021–	Chile	4	(0)
2023–2024	Chile U23	7	(2)
Medal record
Men's football
Representing Chile
Pan American Games
Silver medal – second place	2023 Santiago	Team
- * Club domestic league appearances and goals as of 19 October 2025 ‡ National team caps and goals as of 10 October 2025

Clemente José Montes Barroilhet (born 25 April 2001) is a Chilean professional footballer who plays as a forward for Universidad Católica and the Chile national team.

== Early life ==
Montes was born on 25 April 2001 in the commune of Vitacura, in the city of Santiago, Chile.

== Club career ==
=== Universidad Catolica ===
Montes joined the Universidad Católica youth academy at just nine years old. In October 2019, he signed his first professional contract and was promptly promoted to the first team.

He made his official debut on 30 December 2020, replacing José Pedro Fuenzalida in the 80th minute of a 1–1 draw against Santiago Wanderers. Just days later, on 4 January 2021, Montes scored his first professional goal in a 3–0 victory over Huachipato. On 5 May 2021, he made his Copa Libertadores debut in a 3–1 win against Nacional.

At the end of the 2025 season, Montes extended his contract with the club for two more seasons.

== International career ==
After being called up to the first training microcycle on 2021 of the Chile senior team by Martín Lasarte, he received his first official call up for the friendly match against Bolivia on 26 March 2021, making his international debut at the minute 87 along with his teammate Ignacio Saavedra. In addition, he was in the Chile squad for the 2021 Copa América, but he didn't make any appearance.

He was included in the squad for the 2023 Pan American Games, where Chile won the silver medal.

In 2024, he took part in the Pre-Olympic Tournament by replacing Lautaro Pastrán due to an injury.

== Personal life ==
He has two cousins – brothers to each other – who are professional footballers: the English-born French-Chilean older brother, Richard Barroilhet, who came to Chile on 2017 to join O'Higgins and the French-Chilean younger brother, Jordan Barroilhet, who came to Chile on 2020 to join Deportes Puerto Montt.

On 24 August 2026, Montes married María José Cerda in an intimate ceremony.

== Career statistics ==
=== Club ===
As of As of match played 21 June 2026

Appearances and goals by club, season and competition
Club	Season	League			National cup (Note: Includes Copa Chile)		League cup (Note: Includes Copa de la Liga)		Continental		Other		Total	
Club	Season	Division	Apps	Goals	Apps	Goals	Apps	Goals	Apps	Goals	Apps	Goals	Apps	Goals
Universidad Católica	2020	Primera División	9	1	—		—		—		—		9	1
Universidad Católica	2021	Primera División	12	1	—		—		4 (Note: Appearance(s) in the Copa Libertadores)	1	1 (Note: Appearance(s) in the Supercopa de Chile)	0	17	2
Universidad Católica	2022	Primera División	17	3	3	0	—		0	0	1	0	21	4
Universidad Católica	2023	Primera División	15	1	3	0	—		—		—		18	1
Universidad Católica	2024	Primera División	25	2	2	0	—		1 (Note: Appearance in Copa Sudamericana)	0	—		28	2
Universidad Católica	2025	Primera División	28	6	5	0	—		1	0	—		34	5
Universidad Católica	2026	Primera División	11	3	1	1	5	1	6	2	2	1	25	8
Universidad Católica	Total		117	17	14	1	5	1	6	2	4	1	152	23
Celta Vigo B (loan)	2022–23	Primera Federación	10	1	—		—		—		1 (Note: Appearance in promotion play-offs)	0	11	1
Career total			128	18	14	1	5	1	6	2	5	1	163	24

=== International ===
As of 10 October 2025

Appearances and goals by national team and year
National team	Year	Apps	Goals
Chile	2021	3	0
Chile	2025	1	0
Total		4	0

== Honours ==
Universidad Católica

- Primera División: 2020, 2021
- Supercopa de Chile: 2020, 2021

Chile U23

- Pan American Games Silver Medal: 2023
