= Vicente Bernedo =

Chilean footballer

Personal information
- Full name: Vicente Bernedo García-Huidobro
- Date of birth: 22 January 2002 (age 24)
- Place of birth: Santiago, Chile
- Height: 1.87 m (6 ft 2 in)
- Position: Goalkeeper

Team information
- Current team: Universidad Católica
- Number: 1

Youth career
- 2014–: Universidad Católica

Senior career*
Years	Team	Apps	(Gls)
2021–	Universidad Católica	13	(0)
2022	→ Deportes Concepción (loan)	18	(0)
2023	→ Cobreloa (loan)	0	(0)
- * Club domestic league appearances and goals as of 1 June 2025 ‡ National team caps and goals as of 11 October 2022

Vicente Bernedo García-Huidobro (born 22 January 2002) is a Chilean professional footballer who plays as a goalkeeper for Chilean club Universidad Católica.

== Club career ==
=== Universidad Catolica ===
Bernedo made his professional debut playing for Universidad Catolica in Copa Chile in a 2021 against Deportes Iquique on 27 June 2021.

=== Deportes Concepcion ===
In 2022 Bernedo was Loaned to Deportes Concepcion. where he becomes the starting goalkeeper playing most of the championship.

=== Cobreloa ===
In 2023 Bernedo was loaned to Cobreloa. But since he was not considered, he left the team in the middle of the year.

== Career statistics ==
=== Club ===
As of match played 21 June 2026

Appearances and goals by club, season and competition
Club	Season	League			National cup (Note: Includes Copa Chile)		League cup (Note: Includes Copa de la Liga)		Continental		Other		Total	
Club	Season	Season	Apps	Goals	Apps	Goals	Apps	Goals	Apps	Goals	Apps	Goals	Apps	Goals
Universidad Católica	2021	Primera División	—		3	0	—		—		—		3	0
Universidad Católica	2022	Primera División	—		—		—		—		—		0	0
Universidad Católica	2024	Primera División	—		—		—		—		—		0	0
Universidad Católica	2025	Primera División	30	0	3	0	—		1 (Note: Appearances in Copa Sudamericana)	0	—		34	0
Universidad Católica	2026	Primera División	14	0	1	0	2	0	6	0	2 (Note: Appearance(s) in the Supercopa de Chile)	0	25	0
Universidad Católica	Total		44	0	6	0	2	0	1	0	2	0	62	0
Deportes Concepción (loan)	2022	Segunda División	18	0	1	0	—		—		—		19	0
Cobreloa (loan)	2023	Primera B	0	0	0	0	—		—		—		0	0
Career total			62	0	8	0	2	0	7	0	2	0	81	0
