= Leenhan Romero =

Venezuelan footballer (born 2006)

Personal information
- Full name: Leenhan Schnneiderth D'Alessan Romero Pacheco
- Date of birth: 1 November 2006 (age 20)
- Place of birth: Maracay, Venezuela
- Height: 1.69 m (5 ft 7 in)
- Position: Midfielder

Team information
- Current team: Deportes Concepción (on loan from Universidad Católica)
- Number: 26

Youth career
- 2020–2024: Universidad Católica

Senior career*
Years	Team	Apps	(Gls)
2024–	Universidad Católica	6	(0)
2026–	→ Deportes Concepción (loan)	0	(0)

International career^{‡}
2023	Venezuela U17	12	(2)
- * Club domestic league appearances and goals as of 14 January 2026 ‡ National team caps and goals as of 12 November 2023

Leenhan Schnneiderth D'Alessan Romero Pacheco (born 1 November 2006) is a Venezuelan footballer who plays as a midfielder for Chilean side Deportes Concepción on loan from Universidad Católica.

== Club career ==
Born in Maracay in Venezuela, Romero's family migrated to Chile in 2018. In mid-2020, his performances with youth side Católica de Quilicura at a youth tournament in La Serena, Chile, caught the attention of professional side Universidad Católica, and he signed with the club following a two-week trial. Having initially faced documentation issues, he could not play for the club's youth teams for six months.

Two years later, at the age of fifteen, he was invited by coach Rodrigo Astudillo to train with the first team squad. He impressed then-manager Ariel Holan, with Holan saying of Romero: "he has the qualities, he is dynamic, and he has very good footwork." In May 2023, he signed his first professional contract with the club.

In January 2026, Romero was loaned out to Deportes Concepción.

== International career ==
Romero was first called up to the Venezuelan under-17 team in December 2022, ahead of a friendly tournament where the side would face Argentina and Bolivia. However, due to documentation issues, he could not travel.

Having represented Venezuela at the 2023 South American U-17 Championship, he was called up again for the 2023 FIFA U-17 World Cup, and in Venezuela's opening game against New Zealand, he scored two late goals in a 3–1 win. Following the game he stated that it was "a dream to debut in a World Cup".

== Career statistics ==
=== Club ===
As of 2 November 2025

Appearances and goals by club, season and competition
Club	Season	League			National cup		League cup		Continental		Other		Total	
Club	Season	Division	Apps	Goals	Apps	Goals	Apps	Goals	Apps	Goals	Apps	Goals	Apps	Goals
Universidad Católica	2024	Primera División	2	0	—		—		—		—		2	0
Universidad Católica	2025	Primera División	4	0	—		—		—		—		4	0
Universidad Católica	Total		6	0	0	0	—		0	0	0	0	6	0
Career total			6	0	0	0	—		0	0	0	0	6	0
