= Juan Francisco Rossel =

Chilean footballer

Personal information
- Full name: Juan Francisco Rossel Corozo
- Date of birth: 17 March 2005 (age 21)
- Place of birth: Santiago, Chile
- Height: 1.82 m (6 ft 0 in)
- Position: Striker

Team information
- Current team: Universidad Católica
- Number: 14

Youth career
- 2014–2024: Universidad Católica

Senior career*
Years	Team	Apps	(Gls)
2023–	Universidad Católica	21	(1)

International career^{‡}
2024–2025	Chile U20	15	(7)
- * Club domestic league appearances and goals as of 17 September 2024 ‡ National team caps and goals as of 9 October 2025

Juan Francisco Rossel Corozo (born 17 March 2005) is a Chilean professional professional footballer who plays as a striker for Chilean club Universidad Católica.

== Club career ==
Rosell began his junior career at the Catholic University at the age of 4. The player began to appear in the first team at the end of 2022, when Ariel Holan summoned him for the Chile Cup that year due to injuries and summons to the selection of several players. On 30 December of that year, he signed his first professional contract.

He debuted on 28 June 2023, against Universidad de Chile for the national tournament after entering the 88th minute to replace Cristian Cuevas in his team's 3–0 defeat as a visitor.

== International career ==
Born in Chile, Rossel was born to a Chilean father and Ecuadorian mother and holds dual-citizenship. He was called up to the Chile U20s for the 2025 South American U-20 Championship.

== Career statistics ==
=== Club ===
As of As of match played 21 June 2026

Appearances and goals by club, season and competition
Club	Season	League			National cup (Note: Includes Copa Chile)		League cup (Note: Includes Copa de la Liga)		Continental		Other		Total	
Club	Season	Division	Apps	Goals	Apps	Goals	Apps	Goals	Apps	Goals	Apps	Goals	Apps	Goals
Universidad Católica	2023	Primera División	3	0	—		—		—		—		3	0
Universidad Católica	2024	Primera División	16	1	1	0	—		—		—		17	1
Universidad Católica	2025	Primera División	19	1	3	1	—		1 (Note: Appearance in Copa Sudamericana)	0	—		23	2
Universidad Católica	2026	Primera División	7	1	—		4	1	2 (Note: Appearance in Copa Libertadores)	0	—		13	2
Universidad Católica	Total		45	3	4	1	4	1	2	0	0	0	56	5
Career total			45	3	4	1	4	1	2	0	0	0	56	5

== Personal life ==
His younger brother, Arturo, is an artistic gymnast who has competed at the 2025 Junior Pan American Games.
