= Daniel González (footballer, born 2002) =

Chilean footballer (born 2002)

Personal information
- Full name: Daniel Enrique González Orellana
- Date of birth: February 20, 2002 (age 24)
- Place of birth: Arica, Chile
- Height: 1.86 m (6 ft 1 in)
- Position: Centre-back

Team information
- Current team: Universidad Católica
- Number: 2

Youth career
- –2019: Santiago Wanderers

Senior career*
Years	Team	Apps	(Gls)
2019–2022	Santiago Wanderers	52	(2)
2022–	Universidad Católica	63	(2)

International career^{‡}
2017	Chile U15	5	(0)
2018–2019	Chile U17	14	(1)
2021–	Chile	2	(0)
2022–	Chile U23	1	(0)
- * Club domestic league appearances and goals as of 6 July 2025 ‡ National team caps and goals as of 8 February 2025

Daniel Enrique González Orellana (born February 20, 2002) is a Chilean footballer who currently plays as a defender for Chilean club Universidad Católica.

== Club career ==
He made his professional debut playing for Santiago Wanderers in a 2019 Primera B match against Deportes Melipilla on May 4, 2019. Along with Santiago Wanderers, he got promotion to Primera División after winning 2019 Primera B.

== International career ==
He represented Chile U15 at the 2017 South American U-15 Championship, playing all the matches, and Chile U17 at the 2019 South American U-17 Championship – Chile was the runner-up – and at the 2019 FIFA U-17 World Cup.

Later, he was a substitute for Chile U23 in a friendly match against Brazil U23 on September 9, 2019, and called up to the first training microcycle of the Chile senior team on 2021.

On March 26, 2021, he made his debut for the Chile senior team in a friendly match against Bolivia playing as a right-back.

He represented Chile at under-23 level in a 1–0 win against Peru U23 on 31 August 2022, in the context of preparations for the 2023 Pan American Games.

== Career statistics ==
=== Club ===
As of As of match played 21 June 2026

Club	Season	League			National cup (Note: Includes Copa Chile)		League cup (Note: Includes Copa de la Liga)		Continental		Other		Total	
Club	Season	Division	Apps	Goals	Apps	Goals	Apps	Goals	Apps	Goals	Apps	Goals	Apps	Goals
Santiago Wanderers	2019	Primera División	6	0	—		—		—		—		6	0
Santiago Wanderers	2020	Primera División	19	1	—		—		—		—		19	1
Santiago Wanderers	2021	Primera División	16	1	—		—		—		—		16	1
Santiago Wanderers	2022	Primera División	11	0	1	0	—		—		—		12	0
Santiago Wanderers	Total club		52	2	1	0	0	0	0	0	0	0	53	2
Universidad Católica	2022	Primera División	5	0	5	0	—		2 (Note: Appearance(s) in the Copa Sudamericana)	0	—		12	0
Universidad Católica	2023	Primera División	18	0	2	0	—		—		—		20	0
Universidad Católica	2024	Primera División	26	1	3	0	—		1	0	—		30	1
Universidad Católica	2025	Primera División	28	1	2	1	—		0	0	—		30	2
Universidad Católica	2026	Primera División	6	0	1	0	4	0	5	0	2 (Note: Appearance(s) in the Supercopa de Chile)	0	18	0
Universidad Católica	Total		83	2	13	1	4	0	8	0	2	0	110	3
Career total			135	4	14	1	4	0	8	0	2	0	163	2

=== International ===
As of match played 8 February 2025

Appearances and goals by national team and year
National team	Year	Apps	Goals
Chile	2022	1	0
Chile	2025	1	0
Total		2	0

== Honours ==
=== Club ===
Santiago Wanderers

- Primera B (1): 2019
