= César Valenzuela =

Chilean footballer (born 1992)

Personal information
- Full name: César Hernán Valenzuela Martínez
- Date of birth: 4 September 1992 (age 34)
- Place of birth: Santiago, Chile
- Height: 1.63 m (5 ft 4 in)
- Position: Attacking midfielder

Youth career
- Palestino
- 2010–2012: Udinese
- 2012: → Cádiz (loan)

Senior career*
| Years | Team | Apps | (Gls) |
| 2009–2010 | Palestino | 11 | (0) |
| 2010–2012 | Udinese | 0 | (0) |
| 2011–2012 | → Granada B (loan) | 4 | (0) |
| 2012 | → Cádiz B (loan) | 5 | (0) |
| 2013–2016 | Palestino | 105 | (10) |
| 2016–2023 | Huachipato | 112 | (7) |
| 2021–2022 | → Everton (loan) | 20 | (0) |
| 2023 | → Unión San Felipe (loan) | 15 | (1) |
| 2024 | Santiago Wanderers | 18 | (1) |
| 2025 | Magallanes | 16 | (1) |

International career
| 2007 | Chile U15 | | |
| 2009 | Chile U17 | 6 | (4) |
- * Club domestic league appearances and goals as of 19 May 2026

César Hernán Valenzuela Martínez (born 4 September 1992), known as César Valenzuela, is a Chilean footballer who plays as a midfielder.

== Club career ==
In 2024, Valenzuela joined Santiago Wanderers. The next year, he switched to Magallanes. In 2026, he trialed with Unión Española.

== International career ==
Valenzuela represented Chile at youth level in both the 2007 South American U-15 Championship and the 2009 South American U-17 Championship.

Valenzuela got his first call up to the senior Chile squad for a friendly against the United States in January 2015.
