= Dylan Escobar =

Chilean footballer (born 2000)

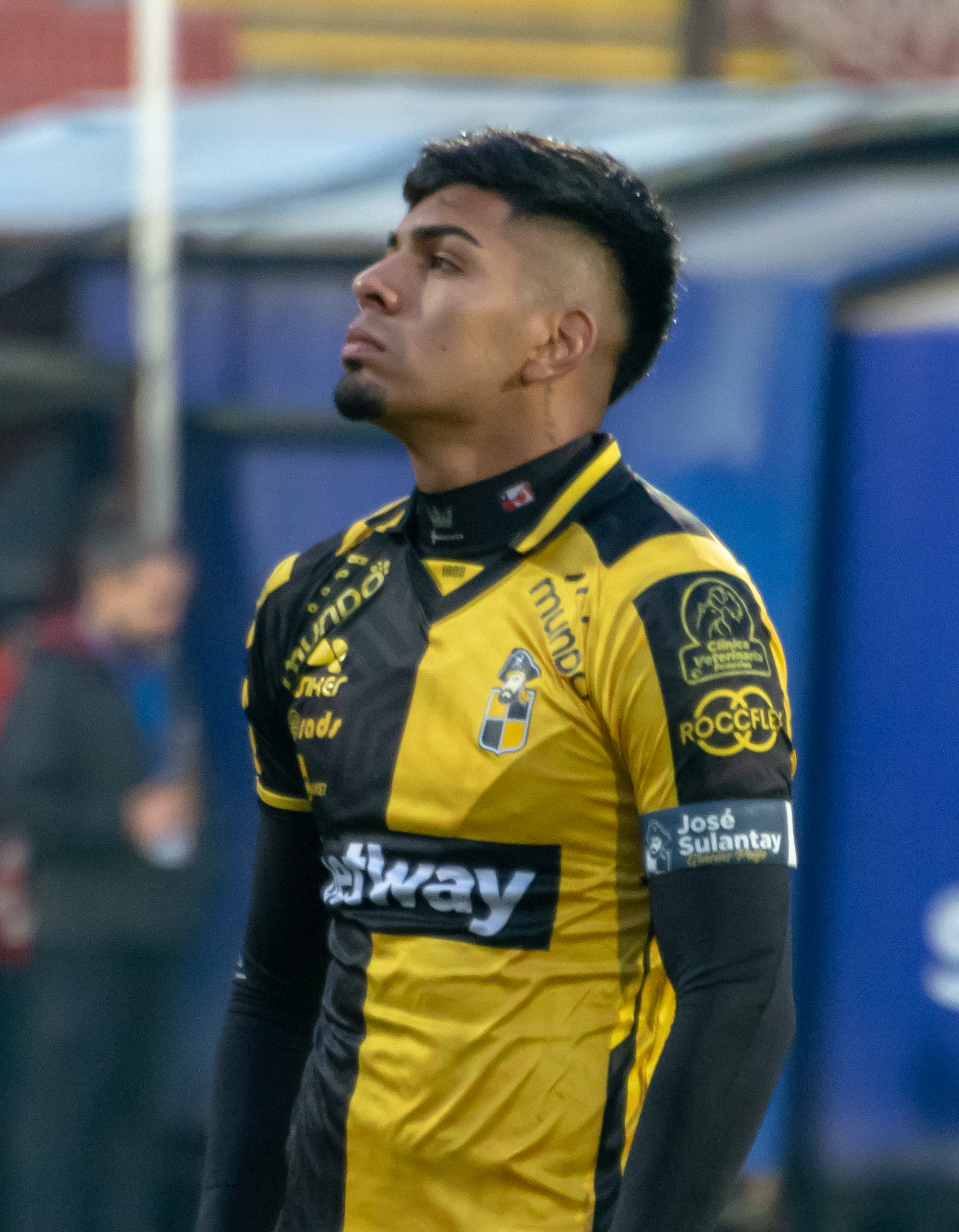
- Escobar with Coquimbo Unido in 2023

Personal information
- Full name: Dylan Alejandro Escobar Álvarez
- Date of birth: 2 December 2000 (age 25)
- Place of birth: Huasco, Chile
- Height: 1.83 m (6 ft 0 in)
- Positions: Right-back; defensive midfielder

Team information
- Current team: Deportes Limache (on loan from Coquimbo Unido)

Youth career
- 2019–2021: Coquimbo Unido

Senior career*
Years	Team	Apps	(Gls)
2022–	Coquimbo Unido	84	(0)
2025	→ Universidad Católica (loan)	7	(0)
2026–	→ Deportes Limache (loan)	0	(0)

International career^{‡}
2025–	Chile	1	(0)
- * Club domestic league appearances and goals as of 30 June 2026 ‡ National team caps and goals as of 17 March 2025

Dylan Alejandro Escobar Álvarez (born 2 December 2000) is a Chilean professional footballer who plays as a defender for Chilean Primera División side Deportes Limache on loan from Coquimbo Unido. He can operate as a right-back or defensive midfielder.

== Club career ==
Born in Huasco, Chile, Escobar came to Coquimbo Unido youth system in 2019 and signed his first professional contract in January 2022. He made his professional debut in the 2–1 loss against O'Higgins on 1 April 2022, by replacing Víctor González at the minute 93.

Escobar joined on loan to Universidad Católica for the 2025 season with an option to buy. Back to Coquimbo Unido for the 2026 season, he was sent on loan to Deportes Limache in July 2026.

== International career ==
Escobar received his first call-up to the Chile national team for the friendly against Panama on 8 February 2025. He made his debut by replacing Fabián Hormazábal in the second half of the match.

== Personal life ==
Escobar is nicknamed Hueso (Bone).

== Career statistics ==
=== Club ===
As of 6 July 2025

Appearances and goals by club, season and competition
Club	Season	League			Cup		Continental		Total	
Club	Season	Division	Apps	Goals	Apps	Goals	Apps	Goals	Apps	Goals
Coquimbo Unido	2022	Chilean Primera División	19	0	2	0	—		20	0
Coquimbo Unido	2023	Chilean Primera División	27	0	2	0	—		29	0
Coquimbo Unido	2024	Chilean Primera División	28	0	5	0	7	0	40	0
Coquimbo Unido	Total		74	0	9	0	7	0	90	0
Universidad Católica (loan)	2025	Chilean Primera División	4	0	4	0	1	0	9	0
Career total			78	0	13	0	8	0	99	0

=== International ===
As of match played 17 March 2025

Appearances and goals by national team and year
National team	Year	Apps	Goals
Chile	2025	1	0
Total		1	0

== Honours ==
Coquimbo Unido

- Supercopa de Chile: 2026
