= Felipe Ogaz =

Chilean footballer

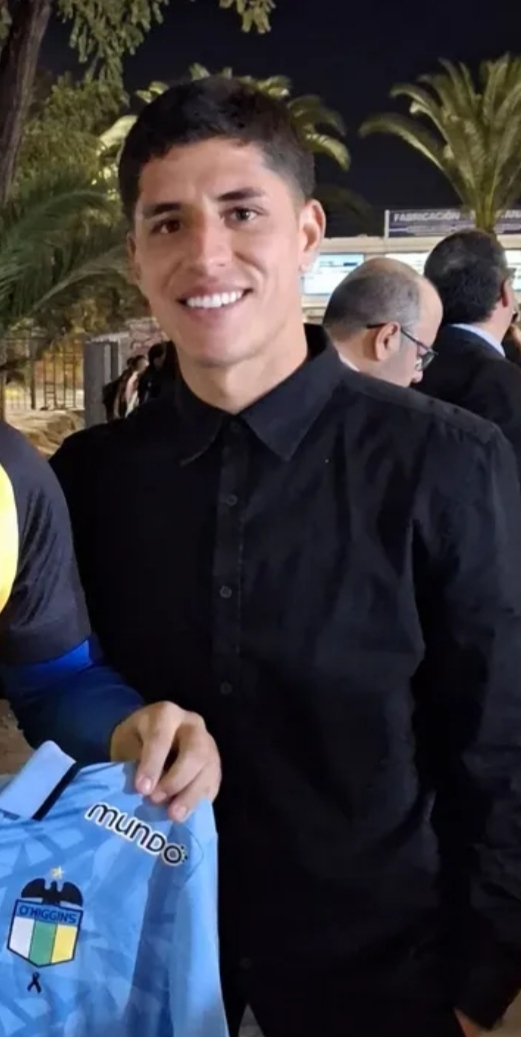
- Ogaz at the O'Higgins' 70th Anniversary

Personal information
- Full name: Felipe Andrés Ogaz Muñoz
- Date of birth: 7 May 2003 (age 23)
- Place of birth: Quinta de Tilcoco, Chile
- Height: 1.74 m (5 ft 9 in)
- Position: Midfielder

Team information
- Current team: O'Higgins
- Number: 20

Youth career
- 2011–2022: O'Higgins
- 2023: → Fluminense (loan)

Senior career*
Years	Team	Apps	(Gls)
2022–	O'Higgins	27	(2)

International career
2022	Chile U20	2	(0)
- * Club domestic league appearances and goals as of 8 January 2026

Felipe Andrés Ogaz Muñoz (born 7 May 2003) is a Chilean footballer who plays as a midfielder for Chilean Primera División side O'Higgins.

== Club career ==
Born in Quinta de Tilcoco, Chile, Ogaz joined the O'Higgins youth ranks in March 2011, aged 7. He made his professional debut in the 3–0 win against Deportes La Serena on 4 February 2022 for the Chilean Primera División and scored his first goal in the same year in the Copa Chile match against Unión Española on 17 August.

During 2023, Ogaz was loaned out to the under-20 team of Brazilian club Fluminense alongside his fellow Nicolás Matamoros. Back to O'Higgins, he got regularity during 2025 and renewed for the 2026 season.

== International career ==
In 2022, Ogaz represented Chile at under-20 level in a friendly against Peru and the Costa Cálida Supercup, where he made an appearance in the 1–3 win against Australia.

At senior level, Ogaz received his first call-up for the 2026 FIFA Series matches against Cape Verde and New Zealand in March 2026.
