= Ignacio Mesías =

Chilean footballer

Personal information
- Full name: Ignacio Sebastián Mesías González
- Date of birth: 16 October 2000 (age 26)
- Place of birth: Los Andes, Chile
- Height: 1.72 m (5 ft 8 in)
- Position: Forward

Team information
- Current team: Rangers (on loan from Unión La Calera)

Youth career
- Unión San Felipe

Senior career*
Years	Team	Apps	(Gls)
2017–2023	Unión San Felipe	45	(6)
2019	→ San Antonio Unido (loan)	14	(2)
2022	→ San Marcos (loan)	10	(1)
2023	Deportes Melipilla	25	(8)
2024	Deportes Concepción	25	(19)
2025–	Unión La Calera	30	(3)
2026	→ Deportes Concepción (loan)	13	(3)
2026–	→ Rangers (loan)	0	(0)

International career
2017	Chile U17		
- * Club domestic league appearances and goals as of 17 July 2026

Ignacio Sebastián Mesías González (born 16 October 2000) is a Chilean footballer who plays as a forward for Rangers de Talca on loan from Unión La Calera.

== Club career ==
Born in Los Andes, Chile, Mesías is a product of Unión San Felipe and made his senior debut in 2017. He was loaned out to San Antonio Unido and San Marcos de Arica in 2019 and 2022, respectively.

On 24 February 2023, Mesías joined Deportes Melipilla. The next year, he switched to Deportes Concepción, won the Segunda División Profesional de Chile and became the top goalscorer of the season with 19 goals.

In 2025, Mesías signed with Unión La Calera in the Chilean Primera División. He returned to Deportes Concepción on loan for the 2026 season. He switched to Rangers de Talca for the second half of the season.

== International career ==
Mesías represented Chile U17 at the 2017 FIFA World Cup.
