= Lucas Menossi =

Argentine footballer

Personal information
- Full name: Lucas Ariel Menossi
- Date of birth: 11 July 1992 (age 34)
- Place of birth: Béccar, Argentina
- Height: 1.65 m (5 ft 5 in)
- Position: Midfielder

Team information
- Current team: Unión Santa Fe
- Number: 5

Youth career
- Tigre

Senior career*
Years	Team	Apps	(Gls)
2012–2019	Tigre	112	(10)
2019–2022	San Lorenzo	24	(0)
2021	→ Tigre (loan)	32	(5)
2022–2024	Tigre	73	(2)
2024	Universidad Católica	15	(1)
2024–2026	Belgrano	35	(1)
2026–	Unión Santa Fe	16	(4)
- * Club domestic league appearances and goals as of 17:23, 22 November 2026 (UTC)

Lucas Ariel Menossi (born 11 July 1992) is an Argentine footballer who plays as a midfielder for Unión Santa Fe.

== Career ==
In 2024, Menossi moved to Chile and signed with Universidad Católica.

On 21 August 2024, Menossi returned to Argentina to join Belgrano, signing a contract until 2025.
