= Nicolás Johansen =

Argentine footballer

Personal information
- Date of birth: 23 January 1999 (age 27)
- Place of birth: Bustinza, Santa Fe, Argentina
- Height: 1.82 m (6 ft 0 in)
- Position: Forward

Team information
- Current team: Coquimbo Unido
- Number: 19

Youth career
- Huracán de Bustinza
- 2017: Newell's Old Boys
- 2018–2020: Colón

Senior career*
Years	Team	Apps	(Gls)
2015–2016	Huracán de Bustinza	–	(–)
2020–2021	Atlético Carcarañá	12	(6)
2022–2023	Douglas Haig	58	(16)
2024–	Coquimbo Unido	13	(4)
- * Club domestic league appearances and goals as of 9 April 2024

Nicolás Johansen (born 23 January 1999) is an Argentine professional footballer who plays as a forward for Chilean Primera División side Coquimbo Unido.

== Career ==
Born in Bustinza, Argentina, Johansen began his career with Huracán de Bustinza, making his debut with the first team in 2015. In 2017, he joined Newell's Old Boys and switched to the Colón reserve team the next year until he was twenty-one years old.

In 2020–21, he played for Atlético Carcarañá in the Torneo Regional, scoring six goals.

In 2022, he signed with Douglas Haig. In 2023, the team became the runner-up of the Torneo Federal A and Johansen was the team goalscorer.

In 2024, Johansen moved to Chile and signed with Coquimbo Unido in the top division, making appearances in the Copa Sudamericana and winning the 2025 league title, the first one for the club.

== Personal life ==
His father, Ricardo, is a football coach and former defender who is a historical player of Almirante Brown.

He is nicknamed Toro (Bull).

== Honours ==
Coquimbo Unido

- Chilean Primera División: 2025
- Supercopa de Chile: 2026
- Copa de La Liga: 2026

Individual

- Chilean Primera División Best Goal: 2025
