= Fernando Zuqui =

Argentine footballer

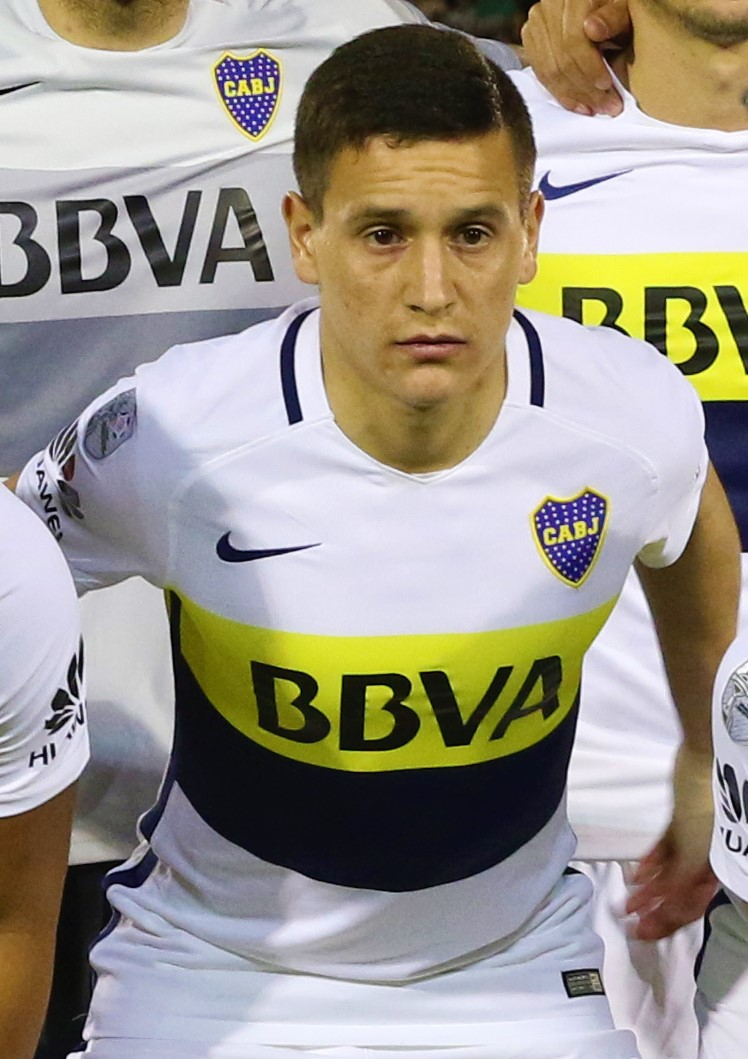
- Zuqui with Boca Juniors in 2016

Personal information
- Full name: Fernando Rubén Zuqui
- Date of birth: 25 November 1991 (age 34)
- Place of birth: Luján de Cuyo, Mendoza, Argentina
- Height: 1.70 m (5 ft 7 in)
- Position: Midfielder

Team information
- Current team: Universidad Católica
- Number: 8

Youth career
- Godoy Cruz

Senior career*
Years	Team	Apps	(Gls)
2012–2016	Godoy Cruz	91	(2)
2016–2017	Boca Juniors	13	(0)
2017–2024	Estudiantes	152	(5)
2019–2020	→ Colón (loan)	29	(1)
2020–2021	→ Yeni Malatyaspor (loan)	11	(0)
2024–	Universidad Católica	25	(1)
- * Club domestic league appearances and goals as of 17 July 2024

Fernando Rubén Zuqui (born 27 November 1991) is an Argentine professional footballer who plays as a midfielder for Chilean Primera División club Universidad Católica.

== Career ==
In the second half of 2024, Zuqui moved to Chile and signed with Universidad Católica on a deal until June 2026.

== Honours ==
Estudiantes

- Copa Argentina: 2023
- Copa de la Liga Profesional: 2024
