= Jader (footballer, born 2003) =

Brazilian footballer

Personal information
- Full name: Jader Barbosa da Silva Gentil
- Date of birth: 24 July 2003 (age 23)
- Place of birth: Rondonópolis, Brazil
- Height: 1.71 m (5 ft 7 in)
- Position: Winger

Team information
- Current team: Portimonense (on loan from Santa Clara)
- Number: 88

Youth career
- 2016–2021: Athletico Paranaense

Senior career*
Years	Team	Apps	(Gls)
2021–2024	Athletico Paranaense	35	(5)
2023	→ Atlético Nacional (loan)	29	(4)
2024–	Santa Clara	0	(0)
2024	→ Universidad Católica (loan)	19	(3)
2025	→ Cuiabá (loan)	15	(2)
2026	→ Atlético Goianiense (loan)	9	(0)
2026–	→ Portimonense (loan)	0	(0)
- * Club domestic league appearances and goals as of 12 September 2026

Jader Barbosa da Silva Gentil (born 24 July 2003), simply known as Jader, is a Brazilian professional footballer who plays as a winger for Liga Portugal 2 club Portimonense on loan from Santa Clara.

== Club career ==
Born in Rondonópolis, Mato Grosso, Jader joined Athletico Paranaense's youth setup in 2016. He made his first team – and Série A – debut on 22 August 2021, coming on as a second-half substitute for David Terans in a 0–1 home loss against Corinthians.

Jader scored his first senior goal on 19 February 2022, netting his team's fifth in a 5–1 Campeonato Paranaense home routing of Cianorte. On 10 January 2023, after making any league matches, he was loaned to Categoría Primera A side Atlético Nacional for one year.

On 30 July 2024, Jader signed for Portuguese Primeira Liga club Santa Clara on a three-year contract. On 9 August 2024, he joined Chilean Primera División club Universidad Católica on loan until July 2024. On 17 July 2025, Jader returned to Brazil, joining Série B side Cuiabá on a season-long loan.

== Career statistics ==
As of match played 24 May 2025.

Club	Season	League			State league		Cup		Continental		Other		Total	
Club	Season	Division	Apps	Goals	Apps	Goals	Apps	Goals	Apps	Goals	Apps	Goals	Apps	Goals
Athletico Paranaense	2021	Série A	13	0	1	0	4	0	0	0	—		18	0
Athletico Paranaense	2022	Série A	0	0	12	3	0	0	0	0	0	0	12	3
Athletico Paranaense	2024	Série A	0	0	9	0	0	0	1 (Note: Appearance(s) in Copa Sudamericana)	0	0	0	10	0
Athletico Paranaense	Total		13	0	22	3	4	0	1	0	0	0	40	3
Atlético Nacional (loan)	2023	Liga Dimayor	29	4	—		3	0	4 (Note: Appearance(s) in Copa Libertadores)	0	1 (Note: Appearance(s) in Superliga Colombiana)	0	37	4
Santa Clara	2024–25	Primeira Liga	0	0	—		—		—		—		0	0
Santa Clara	2025–26	Primeira Liga	0	0	0	0	0	0	0	0	—		0	0
Santa Clara	Total		0	0	0	0	0	0	0	0	—		0	0
Universidad Católica (loan)	2024	Chilean Primera División	8	1	—		—		—		—		8	1
Universidad Católica (loan)	2025	Chilean Primera División	11	2	5	1	—		1 (Note: Appearances in Copa Sudamericana)	0	—		17	3
Universidad Católica (loan)	Total		19	3	5	1	—		1	0	—		25	4
Career total			61	7	27	4	7	0	6	0	1	0	102	11

== Honours ==
Athletico Paranaense

- Copa Sudamericana: 2021

Atlético Nacional

- Superliga Colombiana: 2023
