= Agustín Farías =

Argentine-Chilean footballer

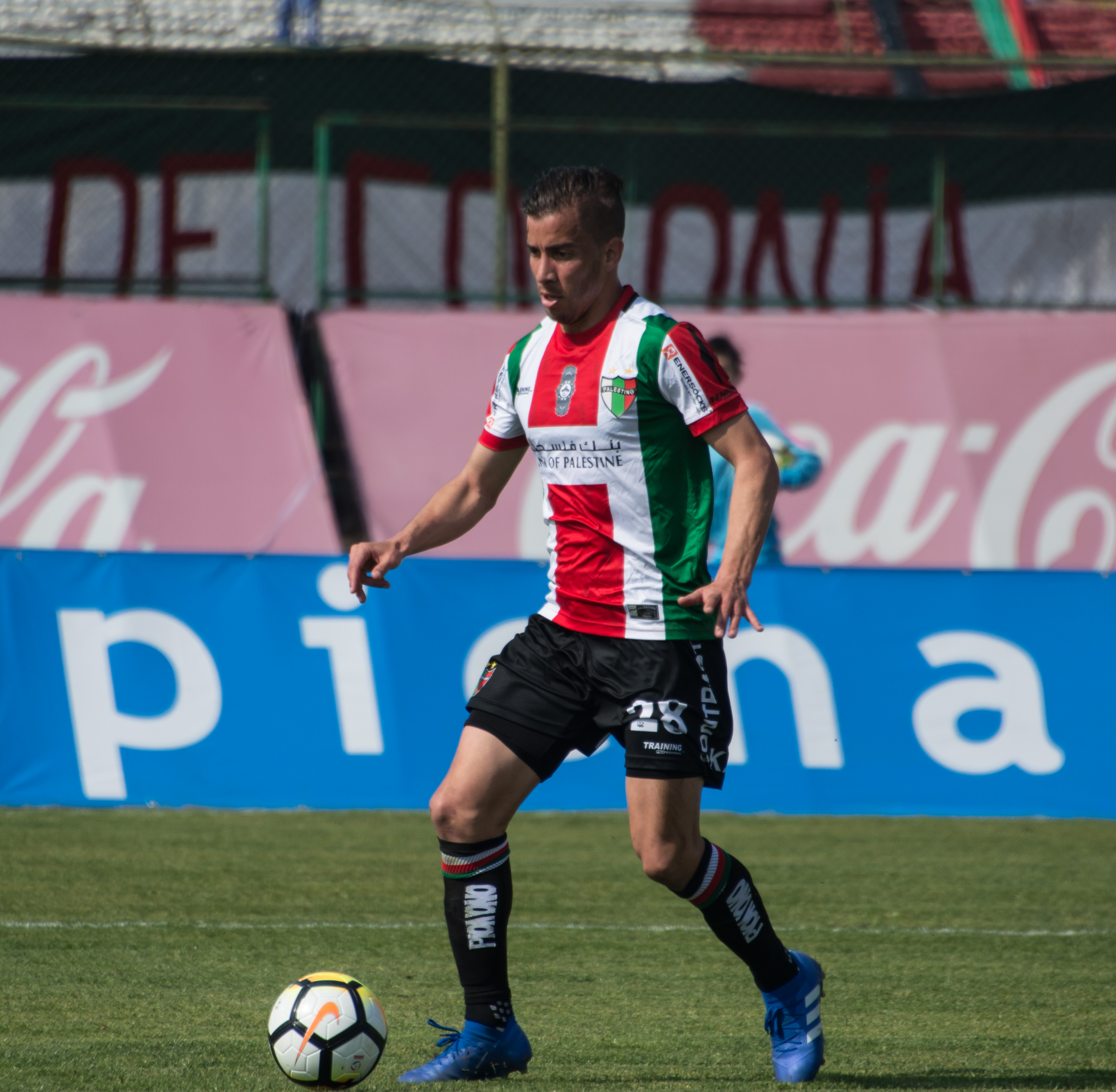
- Farías with Palestino in 2018

Personal information
- Full name: Carlos Agustín Farías
- Date of birth: 25 December 1987 (age 38)
- Place of birth: Buenos Aires, Argentina
- Height: 1.79 m (5 ft 10 in)
- Position: Central midfielder

Team information
- Current team: Universidad Católica
- Number: 5

Youth career
- Azul Athletic

Senior career*
| Years | Team | Apps | (Gls) |
| 2006–2008 | Azul Athletic | 44 | (7) |
| 2008–2012 | Almagro | 73 | (3) |
| 2012–2014 | Nueva Chicago | 62 | (3) |
| 2014 | Banfield | 1 | (0) |
| 2015–2023 | Palestino | 209 | (12) |
| 2017–2018 | → APOEL (loan) | 11 | (1) |
| 2024– | Universidad Católica | 20 | (0) |
- * Club domestic league appearances and goals as of 24 December 2023

Carlos Agustín Farías (born 25 December 1987, in Buenos Aires, Argentina), known as Agustín Farías, is an Argentine-born Chilean footballer that currently plays for Chilean club Universidad Católica as a midfielder.

== Career ==
Farías joined Palestino in 2015 and ended his contract with them in December 2023. He also had a stint on loan with Cypriot club APOEL, with whom he took part in the 2017–18 UEFA Champions League.

== Personal life ==
He acquired the Chilean nationality by permanent residency, after receiving his naturalization certificate on 3 March 2021.

== Honours ==
Nueva Chicago

- Primera B Metropolitana (1): 2013–14

APOEL

- Cypriot First Division (1): 2017–18

Palestino

- Copa Chile (1): 2018
