= Estadio Santa Laura-Universidad SEK =

Football stadium in Santiago, Chile

Coordinates: 33°24′16.39″S 70°39′32.46″W

Estadio Santa Laura
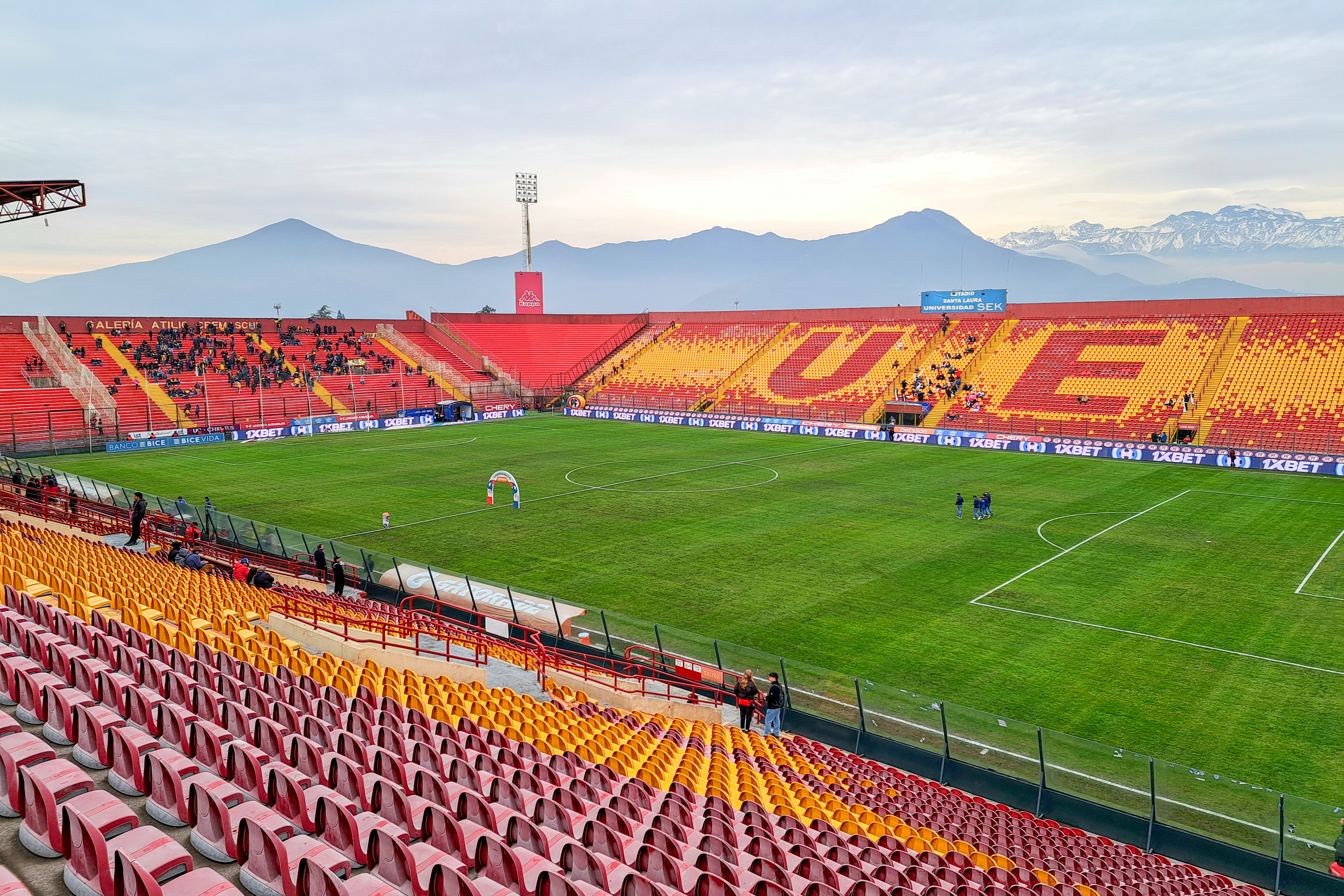
- Interactive map of Estadio Santa Laura
- Full name: Estadio Santa Laura-Universidad SEK
- Former names: Estadio Santa Laura
- Location: Julio Martinez, 1241, Independencia, Santiago, Chile
- Owner: Inmobiliaria Unión Española
- Operator: Universidad Internacional SEK Chile
- Capacity: 19,887
- Surface: Grass
- Field size: 105 x 68 m
- Public transit: at Plaza Chacabuco

Construction
- Built: 1922
- Opened: 1923
- Renovated: 2008

Tenant
- Unión Española

Estadio Santa Laura is a football stadium in Independencia, Santiago, Chile. It is the home stadium of Unión Española. The stadium holds 19,887 people and was built in 1922. It is a multi-use stadium, also used for concerts.

== Deep Purple incident ==
On February 27, 1997, English rock band Deep Purple performed at the stadium, this being the first time they performed in Chile. While performing the song "Fireball", the concert was marred by the collapse of the control tower. Nobody died, but approximately 44 people were injured.
