= Francisco Arancibia =

Chilean footballer (born 1996)

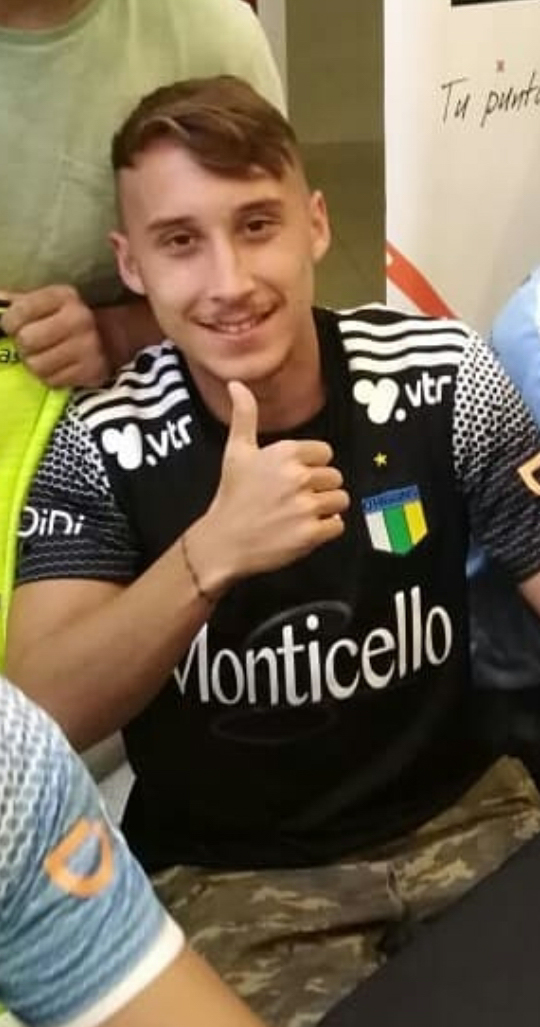
- Arancibia with O'Higgins in 2020

Personal information
- Full name: Francisco Andrés Arancibia Silva
- Date of birth: 12 November 1996 (age 30)
- Place of birth: Rancagua, Chile
- Height: 1.70 m (5 ft 7 in)
- Position: Winger

Team information
- Current team: Deportivo Garcilaso
- Number: 34

Youth career
- 2011–2015: O'Higgins

Senior career*
Years	Team	Apps	(Gls)
2014–2017	O'Higgins	24	(0)
2015–2016	→ Palmeiras (loan)	0	(0)
2017–2021	Universidad de Chile	23	(1)
2019	→ Coritiba (loan)	5	(0)
2019	→ São Bento (loan)	2	(0)
2020–2021	→ O'Higgins (loan)	24	(2)
2021–2023	O'Higgins	56	(2)
2024	Cobreloa	11	(0)
2024–2025	Universidad Católica	15	(0)
2025–	Deportivo Garcilaso	0	(0)

International career
2014	Chile U20		
- * Club domestic league appearances and goals as of 21 July 2025

Francisco Andrés Arancibia Silva (born 12 November 1996) is a Chilean professional footballer who plays as a winger for Peruvian club Deportivo Garcilaso.

== Club career ==
After ending his contract with Universidad de Chile, he signed with O'Higgins in 2021, playing for them until the 2023 season.

For the 2024 season, Arancibia signed with Cobreloa, recently promoted to the top division, but later it was sold to the Universidad Católica for the second semester.

Arancibia left Universidad Católica and joined Peruvian club Deportivo Garcilaso on 21 July 2025.

== International career ==
Arancibia represented Chile U20 at the Torneo Cuatro Naciones Chile 2014.

== Personal life ==
He is a member of a football family nicknamed "Arancibia Dynasty" since both his father, Leopoldo, and his three uncles – Franz, Eduardo and Roque – were professional footballers.

== Honours ==
O'Higgins

- Primera División: 2013–A
- Supercopa de Chile: 2014

Palmeiras

- Copa do Brasil: 2015
- Série A: 2016

Individual

- Medalla Santa Cruz de Triana: 2014
