= Guillermo Soto =

Chilean footballer (born 1994)

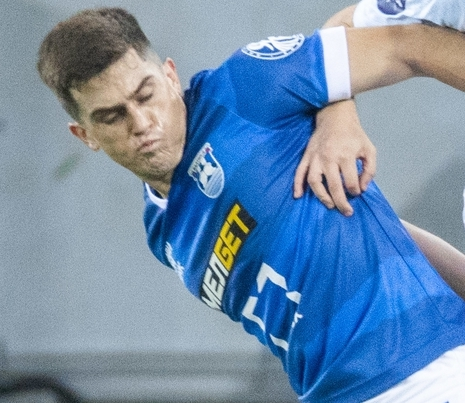
- Soto with Baltika Kaliningrad in 2023

Personal information
- Full name: Guillermo Tomás Soto Arredondo
- Date of birth: 19 January 1994 (age 32)
- Place of birth: Santiago, Chile
- Height: 1.75 m (5 ft 9 in)
- Position: Right-back

Team information
- Current team: Tigre (on loan from Universidad Católica)
- Number: 17

Youth career
- 2005–2014: Universidad Católica

Senior career*
Years	Team	Apps	(Gls)
2014–2017	Universidad Católica	0	(0)
2016–2017	→ Rangers (loan)	24	(0)
2017	→ Barnechea (loan)	13	(0)
2018–2021	Palestino	87	(0)
2022–2023	Huracán	50	(0)
2023	Baltika Kaliningrad	9	(0)
2024–	Universidad Católica	25	(0)
2025–	→ Tigre (loan)	22	(0)

International career^{‡}
2022–	Chile	3	(0)
- * Club domestic league appearances and goals as of 17:50, 9 November 2026 (UTC) ‡ National team caps and goals as of 02:17, 3 April 2023 (UTC)

Guillermo Tomás Soto Arredondo (born 19 January 1994) is a Chilean professional footballer who plays as right-back for Argentine club Tigre, on loan from Universidad Católica.

== Club career ==
Guillermo did all lower in Universidad Católica but his debut was in Rangers de Talca.

In August 2023, he joined Baltika Kaliningrad in the Russian Premier League from Argentine side Huracán.

On 16 January 2024, Soto returned to Universidad Católica and signed a contract until the end of 2026. On 26 June 2025, he joined Tigre on a loan for a season with an option to extend for six months.

== Career statistics ==
As of match played 25 November 2023

Appearances and goals by club, season and competition
Club	Season	League			National cup		Continental		Other		Total	
Club	Season	Division	Apps	Goals	Apps	Goals	Apps	Goals	Apps	Goals	Apps	Goals
Rangers de Talca	2016	Categoría Primera B	4	0	—		—		—		4	0
Barnechea	2017	Categoría Primera B	1	0	—		—		—		1	0
CD Palestino	2018	Chilean Primera División	24	0	10	0	—		—		34	0
CD Palestino	2019	Chilean Primera División	23	0	0	0	10 (Note: Nine appearances and one goal in Copa Libertadores, one appearance in Copa Sudamericana)	1	1 (Note: Appearance in Supercopa de Chile)	0	34	1
CD Palestino	2020	Chilean Primera División	21	0	0	0	4 (Note: Appearances in Copa Libertadores)	0	—		25	0
CD Palestino	2021	Chilean Primera División	19	0	0	0	3 (Note: Appearances in Copa Sudamericana)	0	—		22	0
CD Palestino	Total		87	0	10	0	17	1	1	0	115	1
Huracán	2022	Argentine Primera División	23	0	1	0	—		6 (Note: Appearances in Copa de la Liga Profesional)	0	30	0
Huracán	2023	Argentine Primera División	20	0	2	0	8 (Note: Four appearances in Copa Libertadores, four appearances in Copa Sudamericana)	0	1	0	31	0
Huracán	Total		43	0	3	0	8	0	7	0	61	0
Baltika Kaliningrad	2023–24	Russian Premier League	8	0	3	0	—		—		11	0
Career total			143	0	16	0	25	1	8	0	192	1
