= Diego Céspedes (footballer) =

Chilean footballer (born 1998)

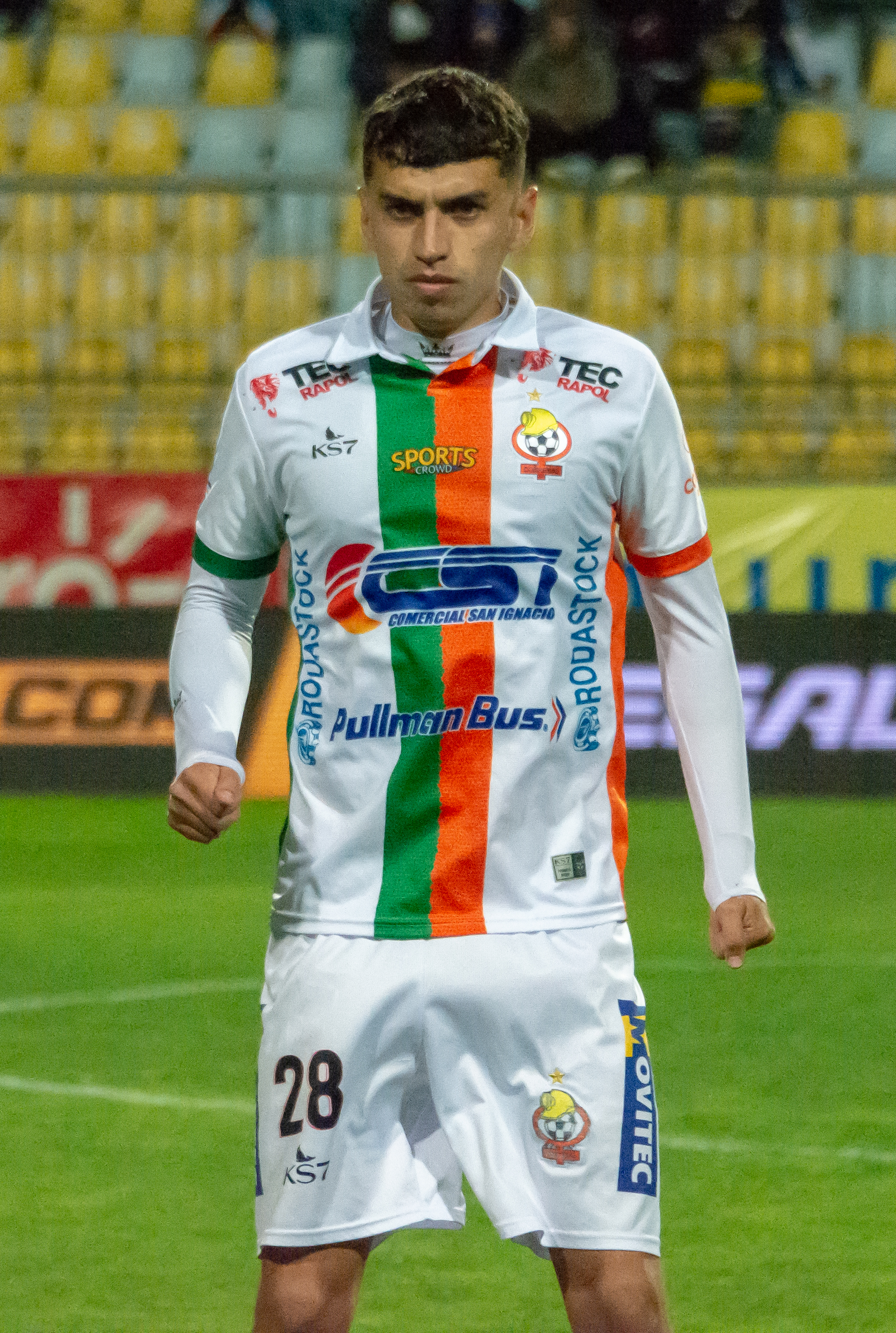
- Céspedes in 2023.

Personal information
- Full name: Diego Andrés Céspedes Maturana
- Date of birth: 25 September 1998 (age 28)
- Place of birth: Puente Alto, Santiago, Chile
- Height: 1.81 m (5 ft 11 in)
- Position: Defensive midfielder

Team information
- Current team: Ñublense

Youth career
- Universidad de Chile
- Unión San Carlos
- 2013–2017: Cobresal

Senior career*
Years	Team	Apps	(Gls)
2017–2025	Cobresal	124	(3)
2019	→ Colchagua (loan)	14	(0)
2026–	Ñublense	0	(0)
- * Club domestic league appearances and goals as of 8 January 2026

Diego Andrés Céspedes Maturana (born 25 September 1998) is a Chilean footballer who plays as a defensive midfielder for Ñublense. He can also operate as a centre-back.

== Club career ==
Born in Puente Alto commune, Santiago de Chile, Céspedes was with Universidad de Chile and Unión San Carlos from Pirque before joining the Cobresal under-16 team. At the age of 17, he moved to El Salvador and made his professional debut in the 2017 Primera B de Chile. During the 2019 season, he played on loan for Colchagua in the Segunda División Profesional.

Céspedes scored his first goal in the 1–1 away draw against Barnechea for the 2022 Copa Chile. Later, he scored his first goal in the Chilean top division in the 0–1 away win against Audax Italiano on 29 April 2024.

With an extensive career with Cobresal, Céspedes has taken part in the 2023 Copa Sudamericana and the 2024 Copa Libertadores and reached 100 matches played in July 2024. He also was a regular player during the 2023 Chilean Primera División, where they were the runners-up. He left them at the end of 2025 season.

On 14 January 2026, Céspedes joined Ñublense.
