= 2023 Club Deportivo Universidad Católica season =

83th season in existence of Club Deportivo Universidad Católica

Universidad Católica
2023 season
- President: Juan Tagle
- Head coach: Ariel Holan (until 21 July); Rodrigo Valenzuela (interim, 21 to 24 July); Nicolás Núñez (from 24 July)
- Stadium: Estadio Santa
- League: 7th
- Copa Chile: Regional stage
- Sudamericana: First stage
- Top goalscorer: League: Fernando Zampedri (20); All: Fernando Zampedri (17)
- Highest home attendance: 10,075 v. Universidad de Chile; League, 11 November 2023
- Lowest home attendance: 3,093 v. Huachipato; League, 10 May 2023
- Average home league attendance: 6,684
- Biggest win: 5–2 v. Palestino (H); League, 26 February 2023
- Biggest defeat: 3–0 v. Universidad de Chile (A); League, 28 June 2023; 3–0 v. Palestino (A); League, 13 August 2025
| Home colours | Away colours |
- All statistics correct as of 6 December 2023.

The 2023 Club Deportivo Universidad Católica season was the 83th season and the club's 49th consecutive season in the top flight of Chilean football. In addition to the domestic league, Universidad Católica also competed in the Copa Chile and the Copa Sudamericana.

== Squad ==
As of December 2023

| No. | Player | Nationality | Position | Date of birth (age) | Year signed | Signed from |
Goalkeepers
| 1 | Vicente Bernedo | (Chile) | GK | 22 January 2001 (age 22) | 2024 | Cobreloa |
| 12 | Thomas Gillier | (Chile) | GK | 28 May 2004 (age 19) | 2025 | Academy |
| 22 | Nicolás Peranic | (Argentina) | GK | 2 June 1985 (age 38) | 2023 | Deportes Melipilla |
Defenders
| 3 | Eugenio Mena | (Chile) | LB | 18 July 1988 (age 35) | 2024 | Racing Club |
| 5 | Daniel González | (Chile) | CB | 20 February 2002 (age 21) | 2025 | Santiago Wanderers |
| 6 | Guillermo Burdisso | (Argentina) | CB | 26 September 1988 (age 21) | 2023 | Deportivo Cali |
| 17 | Branco Ampuero | (Chile) | CB | 19 July 1993 (age 30) | 2023 | Deportes Antofagasta |
| 23 | Byron Nieto | (Chile) | LB / RB | 3 February 1988 (age 25) | 2023 | Deportes Antofagasta |
| 24 | Alfonso Parot | (Chile) | LB / RB | 15 October 1989 (age 34) | 2023 | Rosario Central |
| 55 | Gary Kagelmacher | (Uruguay) | CB | 21 April 1988 (age 35) | 2024 | León |
Midfielders
| 8 | Ignacio Saavedra | (Chile) | CM / DM | 12 January 1999 (age 24) | 2023 | Academy |
| 10 | César Pinares | (Chile) | AM / CM | 23 May 1991 (age 32) | 2024 | Colo-Colo |
| 11 | Juan Francisco Rossel | (Chile) | RW / LW | 17 March 2005 (age 18) | 2026 | Academy |
| 15 | Cristián Cuevas | (Chile) | AM / CM / RB | 2 April 1995 (age 28) | 2023 | Huachipato |
| 16 | Brayan Rovira | (Colombia) | AM / CM | 2 November 1996 (age 27) | 2023 | Deportes Tolima |
| 19 | Bryan González | (Chile) | AM / CM | 23 February 2003 (age 20) | 2025 | Academy |
| 21 | Diego Corral | (Chile) | RW | 9 March 2005 (age 18) | 2026 | Academy |
| 27 | Jorge Ortiz | (Chile) | AM / CM | 23 January 2004 (age 19) | 2026 | Academy |
Forwards
| 7 | Franco Di Santo | (Argentina) | ST | 16 April 1989 (age 34) | 2024 | Xolos de Tijuana |
| 9 | Fernando Zampedri (captain) | (Argentina) (Chile) | ST | 14 February 1988 (age 35) | 2025 | Rosario Central |
| 13 | Axel Cerda | (Chile) | ST | 13 April 2006 (age 17) | 2027 | Academy |
| 14 | Luis Hernández Maluenda | (Chile) | RW / LW | 12 January 2004 (age 19) | 2025 | Academy |
| 18 | Alexander Aravena | (Chile) | ST | 6 September 2002 (age 21) | 2025 | Ñublense |
| 20 | Gonzalo Tapia | (Chile) | RW | 18 February 2002 (age 21) | 2024 | Academy |
| 35 | Clemente Montes | (Chile) | RW / LW | 25 April 2001 (age 22) | 2024 | Celta de Vigo B |
Player(s) transferred out during this season
| 4 | Mauricio Isla | (Chile) | RB / RWB | 12 June 1988 (age 35) | 2022 | Flamengo |
| 13 | Matías Dituro | (Argentina) | GK | 8 May 1987 (age 36) | 2022 | Bolívar |
Player(s) on loan during this season
| 12 | Guillermo Soto | (Chile) | LB / RB | 19 January 1994 (age 31) | 2026 | Baltika Kaliningrad |
| 44 | Milan Tudor | (Chile) | ST | 5 January 2004 (age 21) | 2026 | Academy |

== Contracts and transfers ==
=== New contracts ===
| Date | Pos. | Name | Contract length | Contract ends | Ref. |
|---|---|---|---|---|---|
| 10 December 2022 | GK | (Chile) Nicolás Peranic | 1-year | 2023 | |
| 29 December 2022 | FW | (Chile) Diego Ossa | 3-year | 2026 | |
| 30 December 2022 | FW | (Chile) Juan Francisco Rossel | 3-year | 2026 | |
| 6 January 2023 | MF | (Chile) Jorge Ortiz | 3-year | 2026 | |
| 27 January 2023 | FW | (Chile) Clemente Montes | 2-year | 2025 | |
| 1 February | FW | (Chile) Milan Tudor | 3-year | 2026 | |
| 22 March 2023 | FW | (Chile) Axel Cerda | 3-year | 2026 | |
| 31 March 2023 | FW | (Chile) Diego Corral | 3-year | 2026 | |
| 9 May 2023 | MF | (Venezuela) Leenhan Romero | 3-year | 2026 | |
| 24 May 2023 | DF | (Uruguay) Gary Kagelmacher | 1-year | 2024 | |
| 26 June 2023 | FW | (United States) Ousman Touray | 2-year | 2025 | |
| 6 October 2023 | FW | (Argentina) Fernando Zampedri | 2-year | 2025 | |

=== Transfers in ===
| Date | Pos. | Name | From | Type | Ref. |
|---|---|---|---|---|---|
| 29 November 2022 | FW | (Chile) Alexander Aravena | (Argentina) Ñublense | End of loan | |
| 9 December 2022 | DF | (Chile) Eugenio Mena | Racing Club | Free transfer | |
| 15 December 2022 | FW | (Argentina) Franco Di Santo | (Mexico) Xolos de Tijuana | Free transfer | |
| 17 December 2022 | DF | (Argentina) Guillermo Burdisso | (Colombia) Deportivo Cali | Free transfer | |
| 1 July 2023 | FW | (Chile) Clemente Montes | (Spain) Celta de Vigo B | End of loan | |
| 28 July 2023 | GW | (Chile) Vicente Bernedo | Cobreloa | End of loan | |

=== Transfers out ===
| Date | Pos. | Name | From | Type | Ref. |
|---|---|---|---|---|---|
| 12 August 2022 | DF | (Chile) Raimundo Rebolledo | Ñublense | Buyout clause | |
| 6 November 2022 | DF | (Chile) José Pedro Fuenzalida | Retirated | | |
| 6 November 2022 | DF | (Argentina) Germán Lanaro | Retirated | | |
| 6 November 2022 | MF | (Argentina) Luciano Aued | (Argentina) Unión de Santa Fe | Free transfer | |
| 7 November 2022 | MF | (Argentina) Yamil Asad | (United States) D. C. United | Free transfer | |
| 10 November 2022 | FW | (Chile) Bruno Barticciotto | Palestino | Transfer | |
| 12 December 2022 | FW | (Cuba) César Munder | Cobresal | Free transfer | |
| 12 December 2022 | MF | (Chile) Ignacio Jaque | Santiago Morning | Free transfer | |
| 15 December 2022 | DF | (Chile) Enzo Ferrario | Unión La Calera | Free transfer | |
| 16 December 2022 | FW | (Chile) Fabián Orellana | Retirated | | |
| 17 December 2022 | GW | (Chile) Marcelo Suárez | Santiago City | Free transfer | |
| 19 December 2022 | DF | (Chile) Patricio Flores | Unión La Calera | Free transfer | |
| 28 December 2022 | DF | (Chile) Yerco Oyanedel | Cobresal | Buyout clause | |
| 31 December 2022 | GW | (Chile) Cristopher Toselli | Universidad de Chile | Free transfer | |
| 10 January 2023 | MF | (Chile) Kevin Fernández | Lautaro de Buin | Free transfer | |
| 10 January 2023 | DF | (Chile) Sebastián Pino | (Spain) Alavés | Transfer | |
| 19 January 2023 | MF | (Chile) Felipe Gutiérrez | (United Arab Emirates) Al-Wasl | Buyout clause | |
| 19 January 2023 | MF | (Chile) Cristóbal Vargas | Santiago City | Free transfer | |
| 1 February 2023 | GW | (Chile) Martín Ballesteros | Colo-Colo | Buyout clause | |
| 17 May 2023 | DF | (Chile) Mauricio Isla | (Argentina) Independiente | Buyout clause | |
| 16 July 2023 | GW | (Argentina) Matías Dituro | (Turkey) Karagümrük | Buyout clause | |

=== Loans in ===
| Date | Pos. | Name | From | End date | Ref. |
|---|---|---|---|---|---|
| 5 December 2022 | DF | (Chile) Byron Nieto | Deportes Antofagasta | End of season | |
| 8 February 2023 | MF | (Colombia) Brayan Rovira | (Colombia) Deportes Tolima | End of season | |

=== Loans out ===
| Date | Pos. | Name | From | End date | Ref. |
|---|---|---|---|---|---|
| 11 December 2022 | MF | (Chile) Juan Leiva | Ñublense | End of season | |
| 12 December 2022 | GK | (Chile) Sebastián Pérez | Unión Española | End of season | |
| 18 December 2022 | MF | (Chile) Ian Toro | Deportes Copiapó | End of season | |
| 24 December 2022 | DF | (Chile) Carlos Salomón | Deportes Santa Cruz | End of season | |
| 24 December 2022 | DF | (Venezuela) Aaron Astudillo | Deportes Recoleta | End of season | |
| 30 December 2022 | DF | (Chile) Tomás Asta-Buruaga | Unión La Calera | End of season | |
| 3 January 2023 | GK | (Chile) Vicente Bernedo | Cobreloa | End of season | |
| 25 January 2023 | DF | (Chile) Cristóbal Finch | Barnechea | End of season | |
| 27 January 2023 | FW | (Chile) Clemente Montes | (Spain) Celta de Vigo B | 30/06/2023 | |
| 1 February 2023 | MF | (Chile) Benjamín Iglesias | Lautaro de Buin | End of season | |
| 1 February 2023 | DF | (Chile) Ignacio Novoa | Lautaro de Buin | End of season | |
| 3 March 2023 | FW | (Chile) Nicolás Sepúlveda | Barnechea | End of season | |

== Competitions ==
=== Overview ===
| Competition | First match | Last match | Starting round | Final position | Record | | | | | | | |
| Competition | First match | Last match | Starting round | Final position | Pld | W | D | L | GF | GA | GD | Win % |
|---|---|---|---|---|---|---|---|---|---|---|---|---|
| League | 22 January 2023 | 9 December 2023 | Matchday 1 | 7th | 30 | 11 | 9 | 10 | 48 | 53 | −5 | 36.67 |
| Copa Chile | 8 April 2023 | 20 August 2023 | Regional stage | Regional stage | 5 | 1 | 3 | 1 | 3 | 2 | +1 | 20.00 |
| Copa Sudamericana | 7 March 2023 | 7 March 2023 | First stage | First stage | 1 | 0 | 0 | 1 | 2 | 3 | −1 | 0.00 |
| Total | | | | | 36 | 12 | 12 | 12 | 53 | 58 | −5 | 33.33 |

Last updated: December 2023
Source: Soccerway

=== Primera Division ===
==== League table ====
| Pos | Team | Pld | W | D | L | GF | GA | GD | Pts | Qualification or relegation |
|---|---|---|---|---|---|---|---|---|---|---|
| 5 | Coquimbo Unido | 30 | 14 | 5 | 11 | 43 | 42 | +1 | 47 | Qualification for Copa Sudamericana first stage |
| 6 | Everton | 30 | 13 | 6 | 11 | 42 | 39 | +3 | 45 | Qualification for Copa Sudamericana first stage |
| 7 | Universidad Católica | 30 | 11 | 9 | 10 | 48 | 43 | +5 | 42 | Qualification for Copa Sudamericana first stage |
| 8 | Unión La Calera | 30 | 10 | 11 | 9 | 42 | 41 | +1 | 41 | Qualification for Copa Sudamericana first stage |
| 9 | Universidad de Chile | 30 | 11 | 7 | 12 | 40 | 42 | −2 | 40 | |

Source: ANFP, Soccerway
Rules for classification: 1) Points, 2) Playoff game (only if needed to decide championship between two teams), 3) Goal difference, 4) Matches won, 5) Goals for, 6) Away goals for, 7) Red cards, 8) Yellow cards, 9) Drawing of lots.

==== Results summary ====
| Overall | | | | | | | | Home | | | | | | Away | | | | | |
| Pld | W | D | L | GF | GA | GD | Pts | W | D | L | GF | GA | GD | W | D | L | GF | GA | GD |
|---|---|---|---|---|---|---|---|---|---|---|---|---|---|---|---|---|---|---|---|
| 30 | 11 | 9 | 10 | 48 | 43 | +5 | 42 | 5 | 5 | 5 | 23 | 22 | +1 | 6 | 4 | 5 | 25 | 21 | +4 |

Source: Primera Division

==== Results by round ====
| Round | 1 | 2 | 3 | 4 | 5 | 6 | 7 | 8 | 9 | 10 | 11 | 12 | 13 | 14 | 15 | 16 | 17 | 18 | 19 | 20 | 21 | 22 | 23 | 24 | 25 | 26 | 27 | 28 | 29 | 30 |
|---|---|---|---|---|---|---|---|---|---|---|---|---|---|---|---|---|---|---|---|---|---|---|---|---|---|---|---|---|---|---|
| Ground | A | H | A | H | A | H | A | H | A | H | H | A | H | A | H | H | A | H | A | H | A | H | A | H | A | A | H | A | H | A |
| Result | W | W | L | D | W | W | W | D | D | D | L | L | L | W | D | L | L | W | D | L | L | W | D | W | L | W | L | D | D | W |
| Position | 2 | 1 | 2 | 3 | 2 | 1 | 1 | 1 | 2 | 3 | 4 | 4 | 5 | 4 | 5 | 7 | 8 | 8 | 9 | 9 | 10 | 9 | 9 | 7 | 8 | 7 | 7 | 8 | 8 | 7 |

Updated to match(es) played on incomplete. Source: Primera Division
A = Away; H = Home; W = Win; D = Draw; L = Loss

==== Matches ====
| 22 January 2023 1 | Everton | 0:3 | Universidad Católica | Viña del Mar |
| | | Report | 44' Di Santo; 45+3' Pinares; 74' Zampedri | Stadium: Sausalito; Attendance: 10.306; Referee: Felipe González |

| 28 January 2023 2 | Universidad Católica | 3:1 | Curicó Unido | Concepción |
| | Aravena 32'; Kagelmacher 87'; Tapia 90+8' | Report | 62' Coelho | Stadium: Ester Roa; Attendance: 6.210; Referee: José Cabero |

| 3 February 2023 3 | Coquimbo Unido | 2:1 | Universidad Católica | Coquimbo |
| | Tapia 8' (o.g.); Farfán 90+3' | Report | 31' Isla | Stadium: Francisco Sánchez; Attendance: 11.249; Referee: Benjamín Saravia |

| 12 February 2023 4 | Universidad Católica | 3:3 | Cobresal | Rancagua |
| | Di Santo 12'; Zampedri 25'; Aravena 29' | Report | 1' Lezcano; 38' Sepúlveda; 65' Rueda | Stadium: El Teniente; Attendance: 6.222; Referee: Francisco Gilabert |

| 18 February 2023 5 | Audax Italiano | 1:2 | Universidad Católica | La Florida |
| | Ríos 35' | Report | 59' Mena; 81' Cuevas | Stadium: Bicentenario; Attendance: 6.918; Referee: Nicolás Gamboa |

| 25 February 2023 6 | Universidad Católica | 5:2 | Palestino | Rancagua |
| | Aravena 18'; Kagelmacher 23', 90+5'; Zampedri 36'; Suárez 57' (o.g.) | Report | 45+2' Suárez; 51' Carrasco | Stadium: El Teniente; Attendance: 5.144; Referee: José Cabero |

| 3 March 2023 7 | Ñublense | 1:2 | Universidad Católica | Chillán |
| | Abascia 45+4' | Report | 64' Aravena; 90+4' Zampedri | Stadium: Nelson Oyarzún; Attendance: 8.360; Referee: Fernando Véjar |

| 12 March 2023 8 | Universidad Católica | 2:2 | Unión Española | La Serena |
| | Zampedri 54', 78' | Report | 2' Piñeiro; 37' (pen.) Garate | Stadium: La Portada; Attendance: 3.448; Referee: Francisco Gilabert |

| 19 March 2023 9 | Magallanes | 1:1 | Universidad Católica | La Florida |
| | Alfaro 83' | Report | 55' Aravena | Stadium: Bicentenario; Attendance: 7.440; Referee: Felipe González Alveal |

| 15 April 2023 10 | Universidad Católica | 0:0 | Colo-Colo | Independencia |
| | | Report | | Stadium: Santa Laura; Attendance: 9.555; Referee: Cristian Garay |

| 22 April 2023 11 | Universidad Católica | 0:1 | O'Higgins | Independencia |
| | | Report | 21' Marín | Stadium: Santa Laura; Attendance: 6.828; Referee: Piero Maza |

| 28 June 2023 12 | Universidad de Chile | 1:0 | Universidad Católica | Independencia |
| | 45+1' Guerra; 57' Poblete; 90+6' Osorio | Report | | Stadium: Santa Laura; Attendance: 0 Referee: Francisco Gilabert |

| 10 May 2023 13 | Universidad Católica | 1:2 | Huachipato | Rancagua |
| | Zampedri 55' | Report | 44' Rodríguez; 60' Altamirano | Stadium: El Teniente; Attendance: 3.093; Referee: Fernando Véjar |

| 14 May 2023 14 | Deportes Copiapó | 1:4 | Universidad Católica | Copiapó |
| | Valladares 88' | Report | 29' (pen.), 45+12' (pen.) Zampedri; 56' Aravena; 74' Pinares | Stadium: Luis Valenzuela; Attendance: 4.527; Referee: Cristian Garay |

| 20 May 2023 15 | Universidad Católica | 1:1 | Unión La Calera | Independencia |
| | Aravena 17' | Report | 8' Pérez | Stadium: Santa Laura; Attendance: 7.164; Referee: José Cabero |

| 8 July 2023 16 | Universidad Católica | 0:1 | Everton | Independencia |
| | | Report | 86' Sequeira | Stadium: Santa Laura; Attendance: 7.520; Referee: Felipe González Alveal |

| 16 July 2023 17 | Curicó Unido | 2:0 | Universidad Católica | Curicó |
| | Castro 63' (pen.), 87' | Report | | Stadium: La Granja; Attendance: 4.448; Referee: Piero Maza |

| 23 July 2023 18 | Universidad Católica | 2:1 | Coquimbo Unido | Independencia |
| | Zampedri 25'; Aravena 53' | Report | 82' Holgado | Stadium: Santa Laura; Attendance: 6.917; Referee: Piero Maza |

| 29 July 2023 19 | Cobresal | 2:2 | Universidad Católica | El Salvador |
| | Mesías 57'; Lezcano 63' | Report | 45+2' Aravena; 73' (pen.) Zampedri | Stadium: El Cobre; Attendance: 1.496; Referee: Fernando Véjar |

| 5 August 2023 20 | Universidad Católica | 0:2 | Audax Italiano | Independencia |
| | | Report | 14' Sosa; 45' Bosso | Stadium: Santa Laura; Attendance: 9.128; Referee: Felipe González Alveal |

| 15 August 2023 21 | Palestino | 3:0 | Universidad Católica | La Cisterna |
| | Abrigo 27'; Zúñiga 40'; Chamorro 90+3' | Report | | Stadium: Municipal; Attendance: 3.092; Referee: José Cabero |

| 26 August 2023 22 | Universidad Católica | 2:1 | Ñublense | Independencia |
| | Zampedri 6'; Ortiz 53' | Report | 90+17' (pen.) Rubio | Stadium: Santa Laura; Attendance: 6345; Referee: Diego Flores |

| 31 August 2023 23 | Unión Española | 2:2 | Universidad Católica | Independencia |
| | Piñeiro 41', 45+6' | Report | 38' (pen.) Zampedri; 80' Aravena | Stadium: Santa Laura; Referee: Manuel Vergara |

| 24 September 2023 24 | Universidad Católica | 1:0 | Magallanes | Independencia |
| | Cuevas 49' | Report | | Stadium: Santa Laura; Attendance: 0 Referee: José Cabero |

| 1 October 2023 25 | Colo-Colo | 2:1 | Universidad Católica | Macul |
| | Benegas 90+6'; D. Pizarro 90+11' | Report | 55' Aravena | Stadium: Monumental; Attendance: 37.735; Referee: Felipe González Alveal |

| 7 October 2023 26 | O'Higgins | 0:3 | Universidad Católica | Rancagua |
| | | Report | 29' (pen.), 59', 71' Zampedri | Stadium: El Teniente; Attendance: 7.064; Referee: Francisco Gilabert |

| 11 November 2023 27 | Universidad Católica | 1:3 | Universidad de Chile | Independencia |
| | Tapia 82' | Report | 28' Poblete; 43' (pen.), 72' (pen.) L. Fernández | Stadium: Santa Laura; Attendance: 10.075; Referee: José Cabero |

| 25 November 2023 28 | Huachipato | 1:1 | Universidad Católica | Talcahuano |
| | C. Martínez 53' (pen.) | Report | 45+3' Zampedri | Stadium: Huachipato; Attendance: 5.714; Referee: Cristián Garay |

| 2 December 2023 29 | Universidad Católica | 2:2 | Deportes Copiapó | Independencia |
| | Aravena 8', 22' | Report | 4' García; 14' Castro | Stadium: Santa Laura; Attendance: 5.933; Referee: Piero Maza |

| 9 December 2023 30 | Unión La Calera | 0:3 | Universidad Católica | La Calera |
| | | Report | 37' Montes; 67', 90+5' Tapia | Stadium: Nicolás Chahuán; Attendance: 3952; Referee: Miguel Araos |

=== Copa Chile ===
==== Central–North Zone ====
===== Round of 16 =====
| 8 April 2023 | Deportes Colina | 1–1 (2–4 p) | Universidad Católica | La Florida, Santiago |
| 20:00 UTC−4 | Arraño 10' | Report | Zampedri 90+7' | Stadium: Bicentenario de La Florida; Referee: Nicolás Millas |

===== Quarter-finals =====
| 2 July 2023 | Universidad Católica | 2–0 | Santiago Wanderers | Independencia, Santiago |
| 18:00 UTC−4 | Barboza 24' (o.g.); Aravena 74' | Report | | Stadium: Santa Laura-Universidad SEK; Referee: Juan Lara |
Note: Match originally scheduled for 23 June 2023, 19:00 local time but suspended due to heavy rainfall. It was eventually rescheduled to 2 July 2023, 18:00 local time.

===== Semi-finals =====
| 9 August 2023 | Universidad Católica | 0–0 (5–4 p) | Everton | Independencia, Santiago |
| 20:30 UTC−4 | | Report | | Stadium: Santa Laura-Universidad SEK; Referee: Diego Flores |
| | Penalties |
| | Zampedri (penalty scored); Rovira (penalty scored); Parot (penalty scored); Aravena (penalty scored); Di Santo (penalty scored) | | (penalty scored) Montes; (penalty scored) Madrid; (penalty missed) Barroso; (penalty scored) Sáez; (penalty scored) Oyarzún |

===== Finals =====
| 16 August 2023 | Universidad Católica | 0–0 | Colo-Colo | Independencia, Santiago |
| 18:00 UTC−4 | | Report | | Stadium: Santa Laura-Universidad SEK; Referee: Francisco Gilabert |

| 20 August 2023 | Colo-Colo | 1–0 (1–0 agg.) | Universidad Católica | Macul, Santiago |
| 15:00 UTC−4 | D. Pizarro 25' | Report | | Stadium: Monumental David Arellano; Referee: José Cabero |

=== Copa Sudamericana ===
==== First stage ====
| 7 March 2023 | Audax Italiano (Chile) | 3–2 | (Chile) Universidad Católica | Estadio El Teniente, Rancagua (Note: Audax Italiano played their home match at Estadio El Teniente, Rancagua instead of their regular stadium Estadio Bicentenario de La Florida, Santiago which did not meet CONMEBOL requirements.) |
| 19:00 UTC−3 | Sepúlveda 19'; Sosa 56'; Fuentes 58' | Report | Zampedri 16', 36' | Attendance: 3,045; Referee: Jhon Ospina (Colombia) |

== Statistics ==
=== Goals ===
| Rank | No. | Nat. | Player | League | Copa Chile | Copa Sudamericana | Total |
|---|---|---|---|---|---|---|---|
| 1 | 9 | (Argentina) | Fernando Zampedri | 17 | 1 | 2 | 20 |
| 2 | 18 | (Chile) | Alexander Aravena | 13 | 1 | 0 | 14 |
| 3 | 20 | (Chile) | Gonzalo Tapia | 4 | 0 | 0 | 4 |
| 4 | 55 | (Uruguay) | Gary Kagelmacher | 3 | 0 | 0 | 3 |
| 5 | 7 | (Argentina) | Franco Di Santo | 2 | 0 | 0 | 2 |
| 5 | 10 | (Chile) | César Pinares | 2 | 0 | 0 | 2 |
| 5 | 15 | (Chile) | Cristián Cuevas | 2 | 0 | 0 | 2 |
| 6 | 27 | (Chile) | Jorge Ortiz | 1 | 0 | 0 | 1 |
| 6 | 35 | (Chile) | Clemente Montes | 1 | 0 | 0 | 1 |
| 6 | 3 | (Chile) | Eugenio Mena | 1 | 0 | 0 | 1 |
| 6 | 4 | (Chile) | Mauricio Isla | 1 | 0 | 0 | 1 |
| | | | Own goal | 1 | 1 | 0 | 2 |
| Total | | | | 48 | 3 | 2 | 53 |

- Last updated: December 2023
- Source: Soccerway

=== Assists ===
| Rank | No. | Nat. | Player | League | Copa Chile | Copa Sudamericana | Total |
|---|---|---|---|---|---|---|---|
| 1 | 15 | (Chile) | Cristián Cuevas | 6 | 1 | 0 | 7 |
| 2 | 18 | (Chile) | Alexander Aravena | 5 | 0 | 1 | 6 |
| 3 | 10 | (Chile) | César Pinares | 5 | 0 | 0 | 5 |
| 4 | 16 | (Colombia) | Brayan Rovira | 4 | 0 | 0 | 4 |
| 5 | 20 | (Chile) | Gonzalo Tapia | 3 | 0 | 0 | 3 |
| 5 | 4 | (Chile) | Mauricio Isla | 3 | 2 | 0 | 3 |
| 6 | 9 | (Argentina) | Fernando Zampedri | 2 | 0 | 0 | 2 |
| 6 | 35 | (Chile) | Clemente Montes | 2 | 0 | 0 | 2 |
| 6 | 3 | (Chile) | Eugenio Mena | 2 | 0 | 0 | 2 |
| 7 | 7 | (Argentina) | Franco Di Santo | 1 | 0 | 0 | 1 |
| 7 | 19 | (Chile) | Bryan González | 0 | 1 | 0 | 1 |
| 7 | 17 | (Chile) | Branco Ampuero | 1 | 0 | 0 | 1 |
| 7 | 55 | (Uruguay) | Gary Kagelmacher | 1 | 0 | 0 | 1 |
| 7 | 14 | (Chile) | Luis Hernández | 1 | 0 | 0 | 1 |
| Total | | | | 36 | 2 | 2 | 40 |

*Last updated: December 2023
- Source: Soccerway

=== Clean sheets ===
| Rank | No. | Pos. | Nat. | Name | League | C. Chile | Copa Libertadores | Total |
|---|---|---|---|---|---|---|---|---|
| 1 | 1 | GK | (Argentina) | Matías Dituro | 2 | 1 | 0 | 3 |
| 2 | 22 | GK | (Argentina) | Nicolás Peranic | 3 | 2 | 0 | 5 |
| Total | | | | | 5 | 3 | 0 | 8 |

- Last updated: December 2023
- Source: Soccerway
