= 2022 Club Deportivo Universidad Católica season =

82nd season in existence of Club Deportivo Universidad Católica

Universidad Católica
2022 season
- President: Juan Tagle
- Head coach: Cristian Paulucci (until 18 April); Rodrigo Valenzuela (interim, 19 April to 30 April); Ariel Holan (from 9 May)
- Stadium: San Carlos de Apoquindo
- League: 6th
- Copa Chile: Second round
- Supercopa: Runners-up
- Libertadores: Group stage
- Sudamericana: Round of 16
- Top goalscorer: League: Fernando Zampedri (18); All: Fernando Zampedri (27)
- Highest home attendance: 11,046 v. Colo-Colo (League, 24 April 2022)
- Lowest home attendance: 2,424 v. Ñublense (League, 8 October 2022)
- Average home league attendance: 8376
- Biggest win: 0–4 v. Deportes La Serena (A); League, 10 September 2022
- Biggest defeat: 4–0 v. Ñublense (A); League, 8 May 2022; 4–0 v. Unión La Calera (A); League, 23 October 2022
Home colours	Away colours	Third colours
- All statistics correct as of December 2022.

The 2022 Club Deportivo Universidad Católica season is the 82nd season and the club's 48th consecutive season in the top flight of Chilean football. In addition to the domestic league, Universidad Católica are participating in this season's editions of the Copa Chile, the Supercopa de Chile, and the Copa Libertadores.

== Squad ==
As of 22 July 2022

No.	Player	Nationality	Position	Date of birth (age)	Year signed	Signed from
Goalkeepers
1	Nicolás Peranic	(Argentina)	GK	2 June 1985 (age 37)	2022	Deportes Melipilla
13	Matías Dituro	(Argentina)	GK	8 May 1987 (age 35)	2018	Bolívar
25	Sebastián Pérez	(Chile)	GK	2 December 1990 (age 32)	2021	Deportes Iquique
Defenders
2	Germán Lanaro	(Argentina) (Chile)	CB	21 March 1986 (age 36)	2015	Palestino
3	Cristóbal Finch	(Chile)	CB	1 June 2002 (age 20)	2020	Academy
4	Mauricio Isla	(Chile)	RB / RWB	12 June 1988 (age 34)	2022	Flamengo
6	Nehuén Paz	(Argentina)	CB	28 April 1993 (age 29)	2022	Crotone
7	Tomás Asta-Buruaga	(Chile)	RB / CB	11 October 1996 (age 26)	2020	Deportes Antofagasta
15	Cristián Cuevas	(Chile)	LB / RB	2 April 1995 (age 27)	2022	Huachipato
17	Branco Ampuero	(Chile)	CB	19 July 1993 (age 29)	2021	Deportes Antofagasta
19	José Pedro Fuenzalida (captain)	(Chile)	RB / RWB / RW	22 February 1985 (age 37)	2016	Boca Juniors
21	Raimundo Rebolledo	(Chile)	RB / RWB	14 May 1997 (age 25)	2015	Academy
23	Daniel González	(Chile)	CB	20 February 2002(age 20)	2022	Santiago Wanderers
24	Alfonso Parot	(Chile)	LB / RB	15 October 1989 (age 33)	2019	Rosario Central
29	Aaron Astudillo	(Venezuela)	RB / RWB	17 April 2000 (age 22)	2021	Academy
55	Gary Kagelmacher	(Uruguay)	CB	21 April 1988 (age 34)	2022	León
Midfielders
5	Yamil Asad	(Argentina)	AM	27 July 1994 (age 28)	2022	D.C. United
8	Ignacio Saavedra	(Chile)	CM / DM	12 January 1999 (age 23)	2018	Academy
11	Luciano Aued	(Argentina)	CM / DM	1 March 1987 (age 35)	2017	Racing
22	Juan Leiva	(Chile)	AM / CM	11 November 1993 (age 29)	2021	Unión La Calera
29	César Pinares	(Chile)	AM / CM	23 May 1991 (age 31)	2022	Colo-Colo
31	Bryan González	(Chile)	AM / CM	23 February 2003 (age 19)	2022	Academy
Forwards
9	Fernando Zampedri	(Argentina)	ST	14 February 1988 (age 37)	2020	Rosario Central
14	Fabián Orellana	(Chile)	RW / LW	27 January 1986 (age 36)	2021	Real Valladolid
16	Clemente Montes	(Chile)	RW / LW	25 April 2001 (age 21)	2020	Academy
20	Gonzalo Tapia	(Chile)	RW / LW	18 February 2002 (age 20)	2020	Academy
38	Luis Hernández	(Chile)	RW	12 January 2004 (age 18)	2022	Academy
Player(s) transferred out during this season
5	Valber Huerta	(Chile)	CB	16 August 1993 (age 29)	2019	Huachipato
13	Sebastián Galani	(Chile)	CM / DM	17 August 1997 (age 25)	2022	Universidad de Chile
18	Diego Buonanotte	(Argentina) (Chile)	AM	19 April 1988 (age 34)	2016	AEK
26	Marcelino Núñez	(Chile)	AM / CM	1 March 2000 (age 22)	2020	Academy
30	Diego Valencia	(Chile)	ST/ RW / LW	14 January 2000 (age 22)	2018	Academy
27	Lucas Melano	(Argentina)	ST/ RW / LW	1 March 1993 (age 29)	2022	Central Córdoba
Player(s) on loan during this season
10	Felipe Gutiérrez	(Chile)	AM / CM	8 October 1990 (age 32)	2021	Kansas City
29	César Munder	(Cuba) (Chile)	RW	7 January 2000 (age 22)	2018	Academy
23	Bruno Barticciotto	(Argentina) (Chile)	ST / LW	7 May 2001 (age 21)	2020	Academy

== Transfers ==
=== In ===
Date	Pos.	Name	From	Type	Ref.
3 January 2022	FW	(Chile) Bruno Barticciotto	Palestino	End of loan	
3 January 2022	DF	(Chile) Aaron Astudillo	Deportes Melipilla	End of loan	
3 January 2022	FW	(Cuba) (Chile) César Munder	Deportes La Serena	End of loan	
6 January 2022	MF	(Chile) Sebastián Galani	Universidad de Chile	Free transfer	
12 January 2022	FW	(Argentina) Lucas Melano	(Argentina) Central Córdoba	Free transfer	
24 January 2022	GK	(Argentina) Nicolás Peranic	Deportes Melipilla	Free transfer	
31 January 2022	DF	(Chile) Cristián Cuevas	Huachipato	Free transfer	
1 February 2022	MF	(Argentina) Yamil Asad	(United States) D.C. United	Free transfer	
23 February 2022	DF	(Argentina) Nehuén Paz	(Italy) Crotone	Free transfer	
30 May 2022	DF	(Chile) Daniel González	Santiago Wanderers	€466.000	
21 June 2022	DF	(Chile) Mauricio Isla	(Brazil) Flamengo	Free transfer	
1 July 2022	GK	(Argentina) Matías Dituro	(Spain) Celta de Vigo	End of loan	
1 July 2022	MF	(Chile) César Pinares	(Turkey) Altay	Free transfer	
12 July 2022	DF	(Uruguay) Gary Kagelmacher	(Mexico) León	Free transfer	

=== Out ===
Date	Pos.	Name	To	Type	Ref.
10 December 2021	DF	(Chile) Juan Fuentes	(Argentina) Estudiantes de La Plata	End of loan	
10 December 2021	DF	(Chile) Juan Cornejo	Deportes Antofagasta	Contract terminated	
10 December 2021	MF	(Argentina) Gastón Lezcano	Cobresal	Contract terminated	
30 December 2021	FW	(Chile) Edson Puch	Deportes Iquique	Contract terminated	
3 January 2022	FW	(Chile) David Henríquez	Deportes Concepción	Contract terminated	
1 February 2022	DF	(Chile) Valber Huerta	(Mexico) Deportivo Toluca	€2.220.000	
17 March 2022	DF	(Chile) Rodrigo Sandoval	Rodelindo Román	Contract terminated	
8 June 2022	MF	(Chile) Sebastián Galani	Coquimbo Unido	Contract terminated	
5 July 2022	MF	(Argentina) (Chile) Diego Buonanotte	(Peru) Sporting Cristal	Transfer	
11 July 2022	FW	(Chile) Diego Valencia	(Italy) Salernitana	€2.500.000	
11 July 2022	FW	(Argentina) Lucas Melano	(Argentina) Newell's Old Boys	Contract terminated	
2 August 2022	MF	(Chile) Marcelino Núñez	(England) Norwich City	€3.900.000	

=== Loans out ===
Date	Position	Name	From	End date	Ref.
8 July 2021	GK	(Argentina) Matías Dituro	(Spain) Celta de Vigo	30 June 2022	
30 December 2021	DF	(Chile) Enzo Ferrario	Deportes La Serena	End of season	
1 January 2022	MF	(Chile) Ian Toro	Deportes Copiapó	End of season	
6 January 2022	DF	(Chile) Yerco Oyanedel	Unión La Calera	End of season	
7 January 2022	GK	(Chile) Cristopher Toselli	(Argentina) Central Córdoba	End of season	
16 January 2022	FW	(Chile) Alexander Aravena	Ñublense	End of season	
20 January 2022	DF	(Chile) Carlos Salomón	Santiago Morning	End of season	
10 February 2022	MF	(Chile) Patricio Flores	Unión La Calera	End of season	
11 February 2022	GK	(Chile) Vicente Bernedo	Deportes Concepción	End of season	
12 March 2022	DF	(Chile) Harrison Orrego	Trasandino de Los Andes	End of season	
19 March 2022	MF	(Chile) Kevin Fernández	Lautaro de Buin	End of season	
19 March 2022	MF	(Chile) Benjamín Gómez	Lautaro de Buin	End of season	
20 March 2022	MF	(Chile) Ignacio Jaque	San Antonio Unido	End of season	
8 June 2022	FW	(Cuba) (Chile) César Munder	Cobresal	End of season	
14 June 2022	MF	(Chile) Benjamín Iglesias	Santiago Wanderers	End of season	
21 June 2022	FW	(Chile) Bruno Barticciotto	Palestino	End of season	
28 July 2022	DF	(Argentina) Nehuén Paz	(Argentina) Estudiantes	End of season	
2 August 2022	MF	(Chile) Felipe Gutiérrez	(United States) Colorado Rapids	End of season	

=== New contracts ===
Date	Pos.	Name	Contract length	Contract ends	Ref.
6 December 2021	MF	(Chile) Marcelino Núñez	2-year	2023	
21 December 2021	DF	(Chile) Alfonso Parot	2-year	2023	
21 December 2021	DF	(Argentina) (Chile) Germán Lanaro	1-year	2022	
21 December 2021	MF	(Argentina) Luciano Aued	1-year	2022	
29 December 2021	MF	(Chile) José Pedro Fuenzalida	1-year	2022	
4 January 2022	MF	(Argentina) (Chile) Diego Buonanotte	1-year	2022	
8 January 2022	DF	(Chile) Raimundo Rebolledo	2-year	2023	
23 February 2022	GK	(Chile) Martín Ballesteros	3-year	2024	
1 July 2022	GK	(Argentina) Matías Dituro	3-year	2025	

== Pre-season and friendlies ==
8 January 2022 1	Universidad Católica	6:0	Quintero Unido	Santiago
	Valencia; Tapia; Montes; Aued	Report		Stadium: Cancha Alberto Buccicardi

8 January 2022 2	Universidad Católica	2:0	Quintero Unido	Santiago
	Barticciotto	Report		Stadium: Cancha Alberto Buccicardi

12 January 2022 1	Universidad Católica	2:0	SIFUP	Santiago
	Zampedri; Montes	Report		Stadium: Cancha Alberto Buccicardi

12 January 2022 2	Universidad Católica	2:0	SIFUP	Santiago
	Buonanotte; Barticciotto	Report		Stadium: Cancha Alberto Buccicardi

15 January 2022	Universidad Católica	1:0	Magallanes	Santiago
	Valencia	Report		Stadium: Cancha Alberto Buccicardi

15 January 2022	Universidad Católica	0:0	San Luis	Santiago
		Report		Stadium: Cancha Alberto Buccicardi

29 January 2022	Universidad Católica	2:2	Cobreloa	Santiago
	Gutiérrez; Buonanotte	Report	Cerato; Becerra	Stadium: Cancha Alberto Buccicardi

15 February 2022 1	Universidad Católica	1:1	Santiago Morning	Santiago
	Melano	Report		Stadium: Cancha Alberto Buccicard

15 February 2022 2	Universidad Católica	0:1	Santiago Morning	Santiago
		Report		Stadium: Cancha Alberto Buccicardi

22 February 2022 1	Universidad Católica	2:2	Lautaro de Buin	Santiago
	Melano; Barticciotto	Report		Stadium: Cancha Alberto Buccicard

22 February 2022 2	Universidad Católica	1:1	Lautaro de Buin	Santiago
	Sepúlveda	Report		Stadium: Cancha Alberto Buccicard

1 March 2022	Universidad Católica	3:0	SIFUP	Santiago
	Cuevas; Buonanotte; Munder	Report		Stadium: Cancha Alberto Buccicardi

== Competitions ==
=== Overview ===
Competition	First match	Last match	Starting round	Final position	Record							
Competition	First match	Last match	Starting round	Final position	Pld	W	D	L	GF	GA	GD	Win %
League	5 February 2022	6 November 2022	Matchday 1	6th	30	13	6	11	41	38	+3	43.33
Copa Chile	18 June 2022	13 October 2022	Third stage	Quarter-finals	6	4	1	1	13	4	+9	66.67
Supercopa de Chile	23 January 2022	23 January 2022	Final	Runners-up	1	0	0	1	0	2	−2	0.00
Copa Libertadores	6 April 2022	24 May 2022	Group stage	Group stage	6	1	1	4	5	10	−5	16.67
Copa Sudamericana	29 June 2022	7 July 2022	Round of 16	Round of 16	2	0	0	2	3	8	−5	0.00
Total					45	18	8	19	62	62	+0	40.00

Last updated: December 2022
Source: Soccerway

=== Primera Division ===
==== League table ====
Pos	Team	Pld	W	D	L	GF	GA	GD	Pts	Qualification or relegation
4	Palestino	30	12	10	8	45	35	+10	46	Qualification for Copa Sudamericana first stage
5	Cobresal	30	13	6	11	44	39	+5	45	Qualification for Copa Sudamericana first stage
6	Universidad Católica	30	13	6	11	41	38	+3	45	Qualification for Copa Sudamericana first stage
7	Audax Italiano	30	12	9	9	44	42	+2	45	Qualification for Copa Sudamericana first stage
8	O'Higgins	30	11	11	8	31	31	0	44	

Source: ANFP, Soccerway
Rules for classification: 1) Points, 2) Playoff game (only if needed to decide championship between two teams), 3) Goal difference, 4) Matches won, 5) Goals for, 6) Away goals for, 7) Red cards, 8) Yellow cards, 9) Drawing of lots.

==== Results summary ====
Overall								Home						Away					
Pld	W	D	L	GF	GA	GD	Pts	W	D	L	GF	GA	GD	W	D	L	GF	GA	GD
30	13	6	11	41	38	+3	45	8	4	3	18	11	+7	5	2	8	23	27	−4

Source: Primera Division

==== Results by round ====
Round	1	2	3	4	5	6	7	8	9	10	11	12	13	14	15	16	17	18	19	20	21	22	23	24	25	26	27	28	29	30
Ground	A	H	H	A	A	H	A	H	H	A	H	A	H	A	H	H	A	A	H	H	A	H	A	A	H	A	H	A	H	A
Result	W	W	W	L	L	L	L	W	L	L	D	L	W	L	W	W	W	L	L	W	D	D	W	W	W	D	D	L	D	W
Position	5	3	1	1	4	7	8	8	9	9	10	12	10	12	10	8	9	10	11	10	10	11	10	10	6	7	4	4	6	6

Updated to match(es) played on incomplete. Source: Primera Division
A = Away; H = Home; W = Win; D = Draw; L = Loss

==== Matches ====
5 February 2021 1	Coquimbo Unido	2–3	Universidad Católica	Coquimbo
20:30	Abrigo 25' (pen.); Paredes 31'	Report	Zampedri 45' (pen.), 51'; Rebolledo 83'	Stadium: Francisco Sánchez Rumoroso; Attendance: 7532; Referee: Juan Ignacio Lara

13 February 2021 2	Universidad Católica	2–1	Unión Española	Las Condes
20:30	Valencia 8'; Tapia 70'	Report	Méndez 54' (pen.)	Stadium: San Carlos de Apoquindo; Attendance: 8773; Referee: Felipe González

20 February 2021 3	Universidad Católica	1–0	Curicó Unido	Las Condes
20:30	Zampedri 81'	Report		Stadium: San Carlos de Apoquindo; Attendance: 8000; Referee: Manuel Vergara

27 February 2022 4	Palestino	3-2	Universidad Católica	La Cisterna
18:00	Carrasco 27'; Jiménez 55'; Farías 83'	Report	Zampedri 23' (pen.); Gutiérrez 64'	Stadium: Municipal; Attendance: 700; Referee: Fernando Véjar

6 March 2022 5	Cobresal	3:1	Universidad Católica	El Salvador
20:30	Lezcano 31' (pen.); Mesías 33'; Sepúlveda 72'	Report	Leiva 11'	Stadium: El Cobre; Attendance: 1500; Referee: Julio Bascuñán

13 March 2022 6	Universidad Católica	0:1	Everton	Las Condes
		Report	Di Yorio 57'	Stadium: San Carlos; Attendance: 10716; Referee: Cristian Garay

20 March 2022 7	O'Higgins	2:1	Universidad Católica	Rancagua
	Castro 15', 39'	Report	Zampedri 53'	Stadium: El Teniente; Attendance: 5981; Referee: Juan Ignacio Lara

3 April 2022 8	Universidad Católica	2:1	Universidad de Chile	Las Condes
	Zampedri 15'; Tapia 30'	Report	Osorio 75'	Stadium: San Carlos; Attendance: 10740; Referee: Felipe González

9 April 2022 9	Universidad Católica	0:2	Deportes La Serena	Las Condes
		Report	Herrera 24'; Valencia 74' (pen.)	Stadium: San Carlos; Attendance: 10513; Referee: José Cabero

17 April 2022 10	Huachipato	1:0	Universidad Católica	Talcahuano
	Montes 59'	Report		Stadium: Huachipato-CAP; Attendance: 4953; Referee: Cristian Garay

24 April 2022 11	Universidad Católica	1:1	Colo-Colo	Las Condes
	Zampedri 5' (pen.)	Report	Oroz 90'	Stadium: San Carlos; Attendance: 11046; Referee: José Cabero

8 May 2022 12	Ñublense	4:0	Universidad Católica	Chillán
	Cerezo 12'; Aravena 41', 44'; Rozas 80'	Report		Stadium: Nelson Oyarzún; Attendance: 5000; Referee: Nicolás Gamboa

15 May 2022 13	Universidad Católica	3:0	Unión La Calera	Las Condes
	Zampedri 50', 90+4'; Gutiérrez 82'	Report		Stadium: San Carlos; Attendance: 0 Referee: Felipe González

22 May 2022 14	Audax Italiano	3:2	Universidad Católica	Rancagua
	Alvarado 9'; Palacios 41'; Cornejo 51'	Report	Gutiérrez 11'; Zampedri 55'	Stadium: El Teniente; Referee: Juan Ignacio Lara

29 May 2022 15	Universidad Católica	1:0	Deportes Antofagasta	Las Condes
	Valencia 40'	Report		Stadium: San Carlos; Attendance: 0 Referee: Nicolás Gamboa

3 July 2022 16	Universidad Católica	2:0	Coquimbo Unido	Las Condes
	Zampedri 57', 82' (pen.)			Stadium: San Carlos; Attendance: 0 Referee: Roberto Tobar

19 October 2022 17	Unión Española	1:2	Universidad Católica	Independencia
	Garate 52'	Report	Zampedri 23'; Asad 76'	Stadium: Santa Laura; Referee: Rodrigo Carvajal

17 July 2022 18	Curicó Unido	3:2	Universidad Católica	Curicó
	Oyarzo 54'; Cahais 74'; Coelho 85'	Report	Aued 19'; Fuenzalida 22'	Stadium: La Granja; Attendance: 5.843; Referee: Felipe González

24 July 2022 19	Universidad Católica	0:1	Palestino	Las Condes
		Report	Salas 90+3'	Stadium: San Carlos; Attendance: 8.892; Referee: Piero Maza

30 July 2022 20	Universidad Católica	1:0	Cobresal	Las Condes
	Céspedes 90+4' (o.g.)	Report		Stadium: San Carlos; Attendance: 8,610; Referee: Nicolás Gamboa

6 August 2022 21	Everton	1:1	Universidad Católica	Viña del Mar
	Campos López 75'	Report	Kagelmacher 84'	Stadium: Sausalito; Attendance: 4,516; Referee: Cristian Garay

11 August 2022 22	Universidad Católica	2:2	O'Higgins	Las Condes
	Fuenzalida 19'; Zampedri 80'	Report	Moreira 44'; Barceló 50'	Stadium: San Carlos; Attendance: 7,652; Referee: Piero Maza

27 August 2022 23	Universidad de Chile	0:3	Universidad Católica	Rancagua
		Report	Pinares 8'; Zampedri 49'; Montes 90'	Stadium: El Teniente; Attendance: 23,524; Referee: Julio Bascuñán

10 September 2022 24	Deportes La Serena	0:4	Universidad Católica	La Serena
		Report	Montes 19'; Fuenzalida 38', 74'; Zampedri 56'	Stadium: La Portada; Referee: Juan Ignacio Lara

14 September 2022 25	Universidad Católica	1:0	Huachipato	Las Condes
	Zampedri 56'	Report		Stadium: San Carlos; Attendance: 3,878; Referee: José Cabero

4 October 2022 26	Colo-Colo	0:0	Universidad Católica	Macul
		Report		Stadium: Monumental; Attendance: 38,190; Referee: Roberto Tobar

8 October 2022 27	Universidad Católica	2:2	Ñublense	Las Condes
	Zampedri 5'; Montes 23'	Report	Cerezo 73'; Rubio 82'	Stadium: San Carlos; Attendance: 2,424; Referee: Héctor Jona

23 October 2022 28	Unión La Calera	4:0	Universidad Católica	La Calera
	Passerini 29'; Cavalleri 38', 43'; Sáez 72'	Report		Stadium: Nicolás Chahuán; Attendance: 4,345; Referee: Nicolás Gamboa

31 October 2022 29	Universidad Católica	0:0	Audax Italiano	Las Condes
		Report		Stadium: San Carlos; Attendance: 8,566; Referee: Roberto Tobar

6 November 2022 30	Deportes Antofagasta	0:2	Universidad Católica	Antofagasta
		Report	Pinares 45+2', 75'	Stadium: Calvo y Bascuñán; Referee: Piero Maza

=== Copa Chile ===
==== Third stage ====
18 June 2022	Unión San Felipe	1–3	Universidad Católica	Quillota
15:30 UTC−4	Castro 18'	Report	Zampedri 11', 90'; Fuenzalida 26'	Stadium: Bicentenario Lucio Fariña Fernández; Referee: Fernando Véjar

25 June 2022	Universidad Católica	3–0 (6–1 agg.)	Unión San Felipe	Las Condes, Santiago
17:30 UTC−4	Núñez 11'; Valencia 78', 88'	Report		Stadium: San Carlos de Apoquindo

=== Supercopa de Chile ===
23 January 2022	Universidad Católica	0–2	Colo-Colo	Concepción
19:00 UTC−3		Report	Gil 62'; Villanueva 90+1'	Stadium: Estadio Ester Roa; Attendance: 17,755; Referee: José Cabero

=== Copa Libertadores ===
==== Group stage ====
The draw for the group stage was held on 25 March 2022, 12:00 PYST (UTC−3), at the CONMEBOL Convention Centre in Luque, Paraguay.

Pos	Team	Pld	W	D	L	GF	GA	GD	Pts	Qualification	FLA	TAL	UCA	CRI
1	(Brazil) Flamengo	6	5	1	0	15	6	+9	16	Round of 16	—	3–1	3–0	2–1
2	(Argentina) Talleres	6	3	2	1	6	5	+1	11	Round of 16	2–2	—	1–0	1–0
3	(Chile) Universidad Católica	6	1	1	4	5	10	−5	4	Copa Sudamericana	2–3	0–1	—	2–1
4	(Peru) Sporting Cristal	6	0	2	4	3	8	−5	2		0–2	0–0	1–1	—

Source: CONMEBOL
Rules for classification: 1) Points; 2) Goal difference; 3) Goals scored; 4) Away goals scored; 5) CONMEBOL ranking.

6 April 2022 1	Talleres (Argentina)	1–0	(Chile) Universidad Católica	Estadio Mario Alberto Kempes, Córdoba
19:00 UTC−3	Fértoli 24'	Report		Referee: Gustavo Tejera (Uruguay)

12 April 2022 2	Universidad Católica (Chile)	2–1	(Peru) Sporting Cristal	Estadio San Carlos de Apoquindo, Santiago
18:15 UTC−4	Núñez 45+2'; Zampedri 90+2' (pen.)	Report	Loyola 73'	Referee: Leodán González (Uruguay)

28 April 2022 3	Universidad Católica (Chile)	2–3	(Brazil) Flamengo	Estadio San Carlos de Apoquindo, Santiago
18:00 UTC−4	Isla 16' (o.g.); Pablo 90+4' (o.g.)	Report	Gabriel Barbosa 8', 35'; Lázaro 85'	Referee: José Argote (Venezuela)

4 May 2022 4	Sporting Cristal (Peru)	1–1	(Chile) Universidad Católica	Estadio Nacional, Lima (Note: The Sporting Cristal v Flamengo match, originally scheduled for 5 April 2022, 19:30 local time, was first suspended and later rescheduled to 20:00 local time due to a curfew in Lima for that day which was lifted a few hours before the start of the match.)
21:00 UTC−5	Liza 43'	Report	Zampedri 77'	Referee: Andrés Rojas (Colombia)

17 May 2022 5	Flamengo (Brazil)	3–0	(Chile) Universidad Católica	Estádio do Maracanã, Rio de Janeiro
21:30 UTC−3	Arão 7'; Éverton Ribeiro 39'; Pedro 90'	Report		Attendance: 43,532; Referee: Jhon Ospina (Colombia)

24 May 2022 6	Universidad Católica (Chile)	0–1	(Argentina) Talleres	Estadio San Carlos de Apoquindo, Santiago
20:30 UTC−4		Report	Esquivel 61'	Referee: Gery Vargas (Bolivia)

=== Copa Sudamericana ===
==== Knockout phase ====
===== Round of 16 =====
30 June 2022	Universidad Católica (Chile)	2–4	(Brazil) São Paulo	Estadio San Carlos de Apoquindo, Santiago (Note: Universidad Católica played their home match against São Paulo at their regular stadium Estadio San Carlos de Apoquindo, Santiago, instead of the originally scheduled Estadio Nacional Julio Martínez Prádanos, Santiago.)
20:30 UTC−4	Zampedri 47'; Valencia 85'	Report	Reinaldo 15' (pen.); Luciano 28', 39'; Calleri 63'	Referee: Christian Ferreyra (Uruguay)

7 July 2022	São Paulo (Brazil)	4–1	(Chile) Universidad Católica	Estádio do Morumbi, São Paulo
21:30 UTC−3	Luciano 14'; Éder 45+5' (pen.); João Moreira 59'; Rodrigo 81'	Report	Fuenzalida 89'	Referee: Alexis Herrera (Venezuela)

== Statistics ==
=== Squad statistics ===
No.	Pos	Nat	Player	Total		League		Copa		Supercopa		Libertadores		Sudamericana	
No.	Pos	Nat	Player	Apps	Goals	Apps	Goals	Apps	Goals	Apps	Goals	Apps	Goals	Apps	Goals
1	GK	(Argentina)	Nicolás Peranic	2	0	1	0	1	0	0	0	0	0	0	0
2	DF	(Argentina)	Germán Lanaro	9	0	9	0	0	0	0	0	0	0	0	0
3	DF	(Chile)	Cristóbal Finch	0	0	0	0	0	0	0	0	0	0	0	0
4	DF	(Chile)	Aaron Astudillo	6	0	4	0	0	0	0	0	1	0	1	0
5	DF	(Chile)	Valber Huerta †	1	0	0	0	0	0	1	0	0	0	0	0
5	MF	(Argentina)	Yamil Asad †	14	1	12	1	1	0	0	0	1	0	0	0
6	DF	(Argentina)	Nehuén Paz †	13	0	8	0	0	0	0	0	4	0	1	0
7	DF	(Chile)	Tomás Asta-Buruaga	26	0	17	0	2	0	0	0	5	0	2	0
8	MF	(Chile)	Ignacio Saavedra	37	0	25	0	6	0	0	0	4	0	2	0
9	FW	(Argentina)	Fernando Zampedri	44	27	29	18	6	6	1	0	6	2	2	1
10	MF	(Chile)	Felipe Gutiérrez	26	3	16	3	2	0	1	0	5	0	2	0
11	MF	(Argentina)	Luciano Aued	22	1	15	1	6	0	0	0	0	0	1	0
13	GK	(Argentina)	Matías Dituro	17	0	14	0	3	0	0	0	0	0	0	0
13	MF	(Chile)	Sebastián Galani †	10	0	5	0	0	0	1	0	4	0	0	0
14	FW	(Chile)	Fabián Orellana	24	0	13	0	5	0	1	0	3	0	2	0
15	DF	(Chile)	Cristián Cuevas	19	0	10	0	2	0	0	0	5	0	2	0
16	FW	(Chile)	Clemente Montes	21	3	17	3	3	0	1	0	0	0	0	0
17	DF	(Chile)	Branco Ampuero	32	1	21	0	6	1	1	0	2	0	2	0
18	MF	(Argentina)	Diego Buonanotte †	17	0	11	0	1	0	1	0	4	0	0	0
19	DF	(Chile)	José Pedro Fuenzalida	40	6	26	4	6	1	1	0	5	0	2	1
20	FW	(Chile)	Gonzalo Tapia	41	3	29	2	5	1	1	0	4	0	2	0
21	DF	(Chile)	Raimundo Rebolledo	18	1	12	1	1	0	0	0	5	0	0	0
22	MF	(Chile)	Juan Leiva	26	1	21	1	1	0	0	0	4	0	0	0
23	FW	(Chile)	Bruno Barticciotto †	7	0	5	0	0	0	0	0	2	0	0	0
24	DF	(Chile)	Alfonso Parot	45	0	30	0	6	0	1	0	6	0	2	0
25	GK	(Chile)	Sebastián Pérez	25	0	14	0	2	0	1	0	6	0	2	0
26	MF	(Chile)	Marcelino Núñez †	23	2	16	0	1	1	1	0	3	1	2	0
27	FW	(Argentina)	Lucas Melano †	8	0	5	0	0	0	0	0	3	0	0	0
29	MF	(Chile)	César Munder †	1	0	1	0	0	0	0	0	0	0	0	0
29	MF	(Chile)	César Pinares †	14	3	11	3	3	0	0	0	0	0	0	0
29	DF	(Chile)	Daniel González	12	0	5	0	5	0	0	0	0	0	2	0
30	FW	(Chile)	Diego Valencia	22	5	13	2	1	2	1	0	5	0	2	1
31	MF	(Chile)	Bryan González	10	0	5	0	5	0	0	0	0	0	0	0
38	FW	(Chile)	Luis Hernández	1	0	0	0	1	0	0	0	0	0	0	0
44	DF	(Chile)	Mauricio Isla	18	0	12	0	5	0	0	0	0	0	1	0
55	DF	(Uruguay)	Gary Kagelmacher	13	1	10	1	3	0	0	0	0	0	0	0

Last updated: December 2022
Source: Soccerway

^{†} Player left Universidad Católica during the season

=== Goals ===
Rank	No.	Nat.	Player	League	Copa Chile	Copa Libertadores	Copa Sudamericana	Total
1	9	(Argentina)	Fernando Zampedri	18	6	2	1	27
2	19	(Chile)	José Pedro Fuenzalida	4	1	0	1	6
3	30	(Chile)	Diego Valencia	2	2	0	1	5
4	16	(Chile)	Clemente Montes	3	0	0	0	3
4	10	(Chile)	Felipe Gutiérrez	3	0	0	0	3
4	20	(Chile)	Gonzalo Tapia	2	1	0	0	3
4	29	(Chile)	César Pinares	3	0	0	0	3
5	26	(Chile)	Marcelino Núñez	0	1	1	0	2
6	22	(Chile)	Juan Leiva	1	0	0	0	1
6	21	(Chile)	Raimundo Rebolledo	1	0	0	0	1
6	11	(Argentina)	Luciano Aued	1	0	0	0	1
6	55	(Uruguay)	Gary Kagelmacher	1	0	0	0	1
6	17	(Chile)	Branco Ampuero	0	1	0	0	1
6	5	(Argentina)	Yamil Asad	1	0	0	0	1
			Own goal	1	1	2	0	4
Total				41	13	5	3	62

- Last updated: December 2022
- Source: Soccerway

=== Assists ===
Rank	No.	Nat.	Player	League	Copa Chile	Copa Libertadores	Copa Sudamericana	Total
1	19	(Chile)	José Pedro Fuenzalida	5	2	0	1	8
2	4	(Chile)	Mauricio Isla	4	2	0	0	6
2	24	(Chile)	Alfonso Parot	5	1	0	0	6
3	20	(Chile)	Gonzalo Tapia	2	0	0	1	3
3	15	(Chile)	Cristián Cuevas	2	1	0	0	3
3	18	(Argentina)	Diego Buonanotte	2	1	0	0	3
4	11	(Argentina)	Luciano Aued	2	0	0	0	2
4	29	(Chile)	César Pinares	2	0	0	0	2
4	26	(Chile)	Marcelino Núñez	1	1	0	0	2
4	30	(Chile)	Diego Valencia	2	0	0	0	2
5	4	(Chile)	Aaron Astudillo	1	0	0	0	1
5	14	(Chile)	Fabián Orellana	0	1	0	0	1
5	23	(Chile)	Bruno Barticciotto	0	0	1	0	1
5	10	(Chile)	Felipe Gutiérrez	1	0	0	0	1
Total				14	5	1	2	22

*Last updated: December 2022
- Source: Soccerway

=== Clean sheets ===
Rank	No.	Pos.	Nat.	Name	League	C. Chile	Supercopa	Copa Libertadores	Total
1	25	GK	(Chile)	Sebastián Pérez	2	2	0	0	4
2	13	GK	(Argentina)	Matías Dituro	8	1	0	0	9
2	1	GK	(Argentina)	Nicolás Peranic	1	0	0	0	1
Total					11	3	0	0	14

- Last updated: December 2022
- Source: Soccerway
