= 2022 Supercopa de Chile =

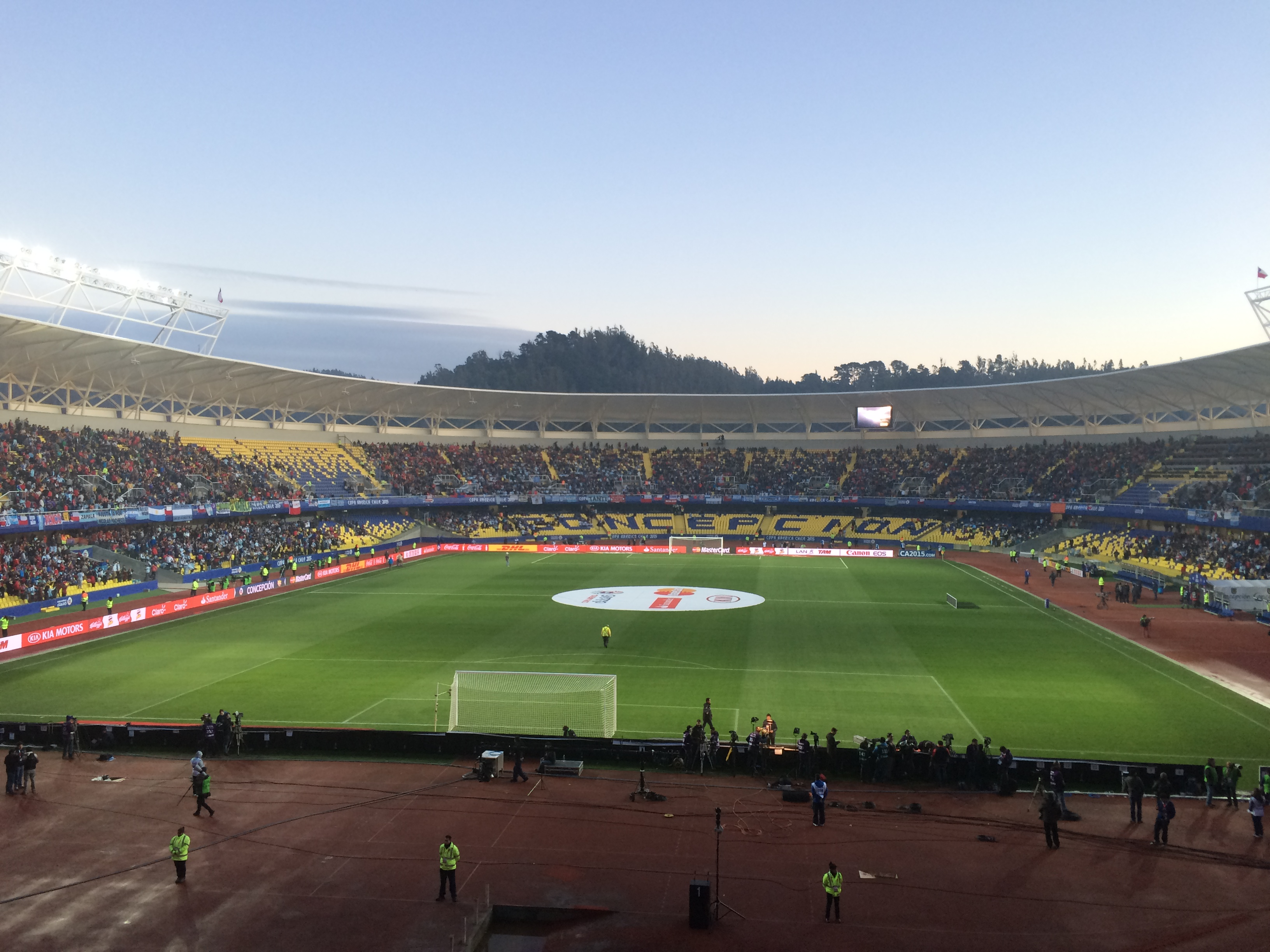
- Estadio Ester Roa in Concepción hosted the match
- Event: Supercopa Easy 2022
Universidad Católica	Colo-Colo
0	2
- Date: 23 January 2022
- Venue: Estadio Ester Roa, Concepción
- Referee: José Cabero
- Attendance: 17,755

The 2022 Supercopa de Chile (known as the Supercopa Easy 2022 for sponsorship purposes) was the tenth edition of the Supercopa de Chile, championship organised by the Asociación Nacional de Fútbol Profesional (ANFP). The match was played by the 2021 Chilean Primera División champions Universidad Católica and the 2021 Copa Chile champions Colo-Colo on 23 January 2022 at Estadio Ester Roa in Concepción.

Colo-Colo defeated Universidad Católica by a 2–0 score to win their third Supercopa title.

== Teams ==
The two teams that contested the Supercopa were Universidad Católica, who qualified as 2021 Primera División champions and Colo-Colo, who qualified for the match as 2021 Copa Chile champions, defeating Everton in the final by a 2–0 score.

Universidad Católica	Colo-Colo
2021 Primera División champions	2021 Copa Chile champions

== Details ==
23 January 2022
19:00 UTC−3

Universidad Católica	0–2	Colo-Colo
	Report	Gil 62'; Villanueva 90+1'

Estadio Ester Roa, Concepción
Attendance: 17,755
Referee: José Cabero

Universidad Católica	Colo-Colo

GK	1	(Chile) Sebastián Pérez
RB	19	(Chile) José Pedro Fuenzalida (c)
CB	17	(Chile) Branco Ampuero	(substituted off) 87'
CB	5	(Chile) Valber Huerta
LB	24	(Chile) Alfonso Parot	(yellow card) 23'
RCM	26	(Chile) Marcelino Núñez
CM	13	(Chile) Sebastián Galani	(yellow card) 74'
LCM	10	(Chile) Felipe Gutiérrez	(yellow card) 27'	(substituted off) 72'
RW	30	(Chile) Diego Valencia
LW	16	(Chile) Clemente Montes	(yellow card) 52'	(substituted off) 57'
CF	9	(Argentina) Fernando Zampedri	(yellow card) 20'
Substitutes:
GK	28	(Chile) Vicente Bernedo
GK	38	(Chile) Thomas Guillier
DF	3	(Chile) Cristóbal Finch
DF	21	(Chile) Raimundo Rebolledo
DF	29	(Chile) Aaron Astudillo
MF	18	(Argentina) Diego Buonanotte	(substituted on) 72'
FW	14	(Chile) Fabián Orellana	(substituted on) 87'
FW	15	(Chile) César Munder
FW	20	(Chile) Gonzalo Tapia	(substituted on) 57'
FW	23	(Chile) Bruno Barticciotto
FW	27	(Argentina) Lucas Melano
Manager:
(Argentina) Cristian Paulucci

GK	1	(Chile) Brayan Cortés
RB	16	(Chile) Óscar Opazo	(yellow card) 73'
CB	37	(Uruguay) Maximiliano Falcón	(yellow card) 61'
CB	15	(Argentina) Emiliano Amor	(yellow card) 45+1'
LB	17	(Chile) Gabriel Suazo (c)
RCM	6	(Chile) César Fuentes
CM	5	(Argentina) Leonardo Gil	(substituted off) 83'
LCM	23	(Chile) Esteban Pavez
RW	36	(Argentina) Pablo Solari	(yellow card) 23'	(substituted off) 83'
LW	8	(Peru) Gabriel Costa	(substituted off) 88'
CF	19	(Argentina) Juan Martín Lucero
Substitutes:
GK	12	(Chile) Omar Carabalí
DF	2	(Chile) Jeyson Rojas
DF	4	(Argentina) Matías Zaldivia	(substituted on) 88'
DF	27	(Chile) Daniel Gutiérrez
MF	11	(Chile) Marcos Bolados	(substituted on) 83'
MF	14	(Chile) Cristian Zavala
MF	22	(Chile) Bryan Soto
MF	26	(Chile) Carlo Villanueva	(substituted on) 83'
MF	34	(Chile) Vicente Pizarro
MF	35	(Chile) Joan Cruz
FW	20	(Chile) Alexander Oroz
Manager:
(Bolivia) Gustavo Quinteros

Assistant referees:
José Retamal
Juan Serrano
Fourth official:
Francisco Gilabert
Video assistant referee:
Manuel Vergara
Assistant video assistant referee:
Raúl Orellana

Match rules

- 90 minutes.
- Penalty shoot-out if scores still level.
- Twelve named substitutes.
- Maximum of five substitutions.
