= Jorge Ortiz =

Jorge Ortiz may refer to:

- Jorge Ortíz (athlete) (born 1954), Puerto Rican Olympic sprinter
- Jorge Ortiz (Argentine footballer) (born 1984), Argentine midfielder
- Jorge Ortiz (Bolivian footballer) (born 1984), Bolivian defender
- Jorge Ortiz (Spanish footballer) (born 1992), Spanish midfielder
- Jorge Ortiz (Chilean footballer) (born 2004)
- Jorge Ortiz (fighter) (born c. 1976), Mexican mixed martial artist
- Jorge Ortiz de Pinedo (born 1948), Mexican comedian, actor, film director, screenwriter, television producer and host
