= Agustín Iglesias =

Chilean engineer and politician

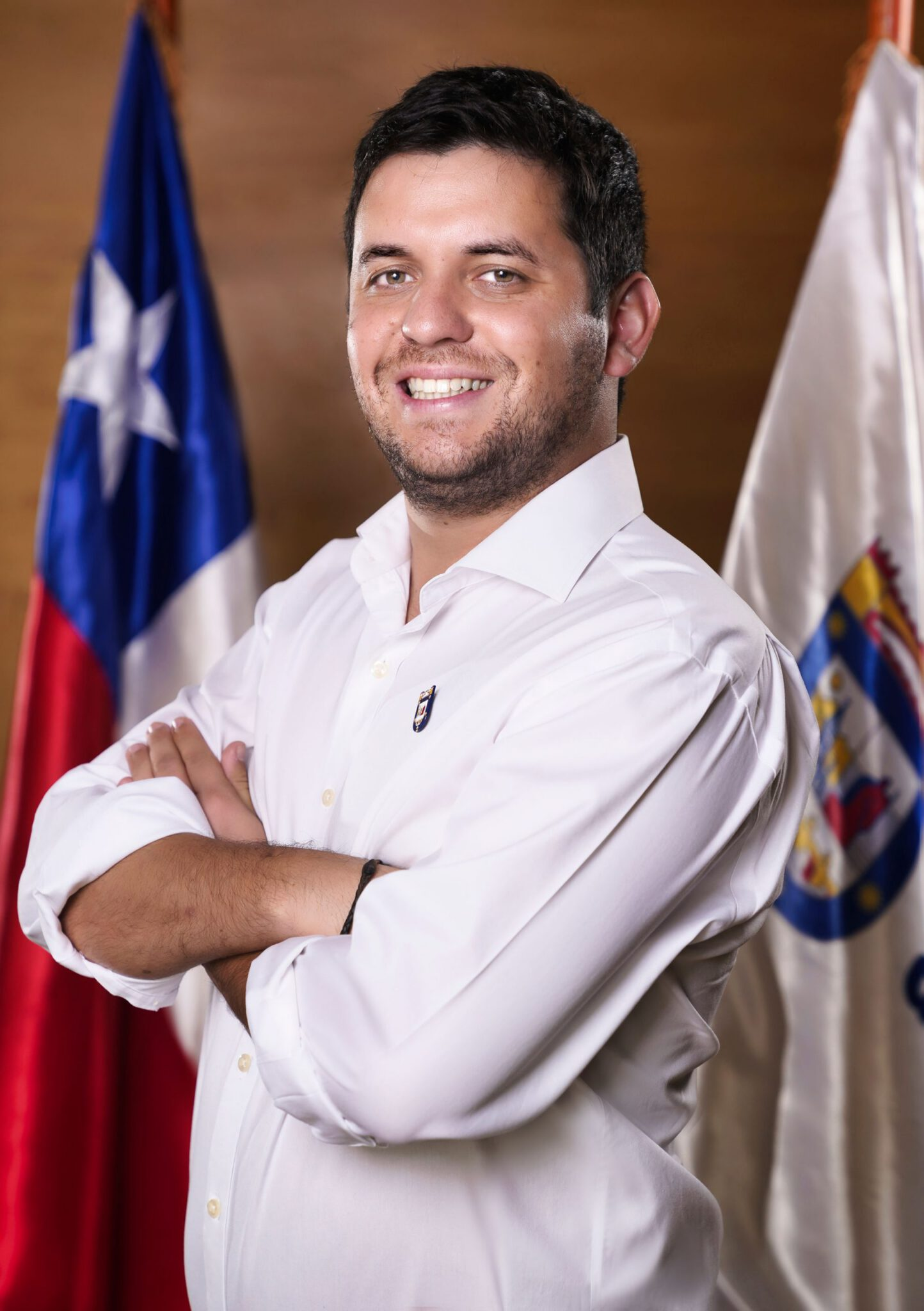
- Official portrait, 2024

Mayor of Independencia
- Incumbent
- Assumed office 6 December 2024
- Preceded by: Moisés Alarcón

Member of the Independencia city council
- In office 28 June 2021 – 6 December 2024

Personal details
- Born: Agustín Ignacio Iglesias Muñoz; 8 August 1995 (age 31)
- Party: Independent

Agustín Ignacio Iglesias Muñoz (born 8 August 1995) is a Chilean civil engineer and politician who serves as mayor of Independencia since 2024.

Previously, from 2021 to 2024 he served as councillor of the Indepedencia city council.

== Early life and education ==
Iglesias was born on 8 August 1995. Raised in Rancagua, in the O'Higgins Region, he studied civil engineering at the Pontifical Catholic University of Chile, where he also earned a master's degree in engineering sciences. His is the first generation in his family to attend university.

== Political career ==
In the 2021 municipal elections, he was elected as councillor of the commune of Independencia, obtaining 1079 votes equivalent to 3.71%.

In 2024, he was elected mayor of Independencia with 45.09% of the vote, ending 12 years of leftist dominance in the municipality. He took office on 6 December 2024. His confrontational style in dealing with criminals and those committing acts of incivility, along with his social media presence, has marked him as the originator of a style that subsequently gained popularity among various mayors.

== Personal life ==
Iglesias is engaged to journalist Daniela Muñoz. He proposed to her in August 2026 at Puente de la Mujer, Puerto Madero, Argentina.

He has a stutter, a condition for which he has been attacked by political adversaries.
