= Carlo Villanueva =

Chilean footballer (born 1999)

Personal information
- Full name: Carlo Alberto Villanueva Fuentes
- Date of birth: 1 July 1999 (age 27)
- Place of birth: Santiago, Chile
- Position: Midfielder

Team information
- Current team: Unión La Calera

Senior career*
Years	Team	Apps	(Gls)
2016–2022	Colo-Colo	40	(3)
2023–2025	Huachipato	45	(4)
2026–	Unión La Calera	0	(0)
- * Club domestic league appearances and goals as of 15 December 2025

Carlo Alberto Villanueva Fuentes (born 1 July 1999) is a Chilean footballer who plays as a midfielder for Unión La Calera.

== Career ==
A product of the Colo-Colo youth system, Villanueva switched to Huachipato in 2023. He ended his contract in 2025.

In January 2026, Villanueva joined Unión La Calera.

== Honours ==
Colo-Colo

- Chilean Primera División (2): 2017 Transición, 2022
- Copa Chile (2): 2019, 2021
- Supercopa de Chile (3): 2017, 2018, 2022

Huachipato

- Chilean Primera División (1): 2023
- Copa Chile (1): 2025
