= Cristhofer Mesías =

Chilean footballer

Personal information
- Full name: Cristhofer Ignacio Mesías Sepúlveda
- Date of birth: 2 May 1998 (age 28)
- Place of birth: Puente Alto, Santiago, Chile
- Height: 1.79 m (5 ft 10 in)
- Position: Midfielder

Team information
- Current team: Universidad de Concepción

Youth career
- Escuela Carlos Ramos
- Unión Española
- 2014–2017: Cobresal

Senior career*
Years	Team	Apps	(Gls)
2018–2025	Cobresal	167	(11)
2026–	Universidad de Concepción	0	(0)
- * Club domestic league appearances and goals as of 3 January 2026

Cristhofer Ignacio Mesías Sepúlveda (born 2 May 1998) is a Chilean footballer who plays as a midfielder for Universidad de Concepción.

== Club career ==
Born in Puente Alto commune, Santiago de Chile, Mesías was with Escuela de Fútbol Carlos Ramos and Unión Española before joining the Cobresal youth ranks in his hometown, aged 16. At the age of 18, he moved to El Salvador and made his professional debut in the 2018 Primera B de Chile.

Mesías scored his first goal in the 4–1 win against Santiago Wanderers for the promotion playoff for the 2019 Primera División. Later, he scored his first goal in the Chilean top division in the 3–2 away loss against Palestino on 18 January 2021.

With an extensive career with Cobresal in the Chilean top division, Mesías was a key player during the 2023 season, where they were the runners-up, and has become the team captain. He left them at the end of the 2025 season.

On 14 January 2026, Mesías joined Universidad de Concepción.
