= Bryan Soto =

Chilean footballer (born 2001)

Personal information
- Full name: Bryan Andrés Soto Pereira
- Date of birth: 1 June 2001 (age 25)
- Place of birth: Santiago, Chile
- Height: 1.70 m (5 ft 7 in)
- Position: Midfielder

Team information
- Current team: Audax Italiano (on loan from Colo-Colo)
- Number: 32

Youth career
- 2008–2020: Colo-Colo

Senior career*
Years	Team	Apps	(Gls)
2020–	Colo-Colo	14	(0)
2022	→ Deportes La Serena (loan)	14	(1)
2023	→ Everton (loan)	16	(0)
2024	→ Deportes Copiapó (loan)	22	(1)
2025	→ Deportes Iquique (loan)	18	(2)
2026–	→ Audax Italiano (loan)	0	(0)

International career^{‡}
2020	Chile U20	2	(0)
- * Club domestic league appearances and goals as of 2 January 2026 ‡ National team caps and goals as of 18 December 2020

Bryan Andrés Soto Pereira (born 1 June 2001) is a Chilean professional footballer who plays as a midfielder for Audax Italiano on loan from Colo-Colo.

== Club career ==
Soto came to Colo-Colo Youth Team at the age of 7. He made his professional debut playing for Colo-Colo in a 2019 Copa Chile match against Deportes Puerto Montt on June 9, 2019. Regarding the domestic leagues, he made his debut fifteen months later in a match against O'Higgins.

Soto was loaned out to Deportes La Serena in 2022 and Everton in 2023. In 2024, he was loaned out to Deportes Copiapó. In 2025, he moved on loan to Deportes Iquique. In February 2026, he joined Audax Italiano.

== International career ==
Soto represented Chile U20 in a friendly tournament played in Teresópolis (Brazil) called Granja Comary International Tournament, making appearances in the matches against Peru U20 and Brazil U20.

== Honours ==
Colo-Colo

- Copa Chile: 2019
