= Nicolás Peranic =

Argentine footballer (born 1985)

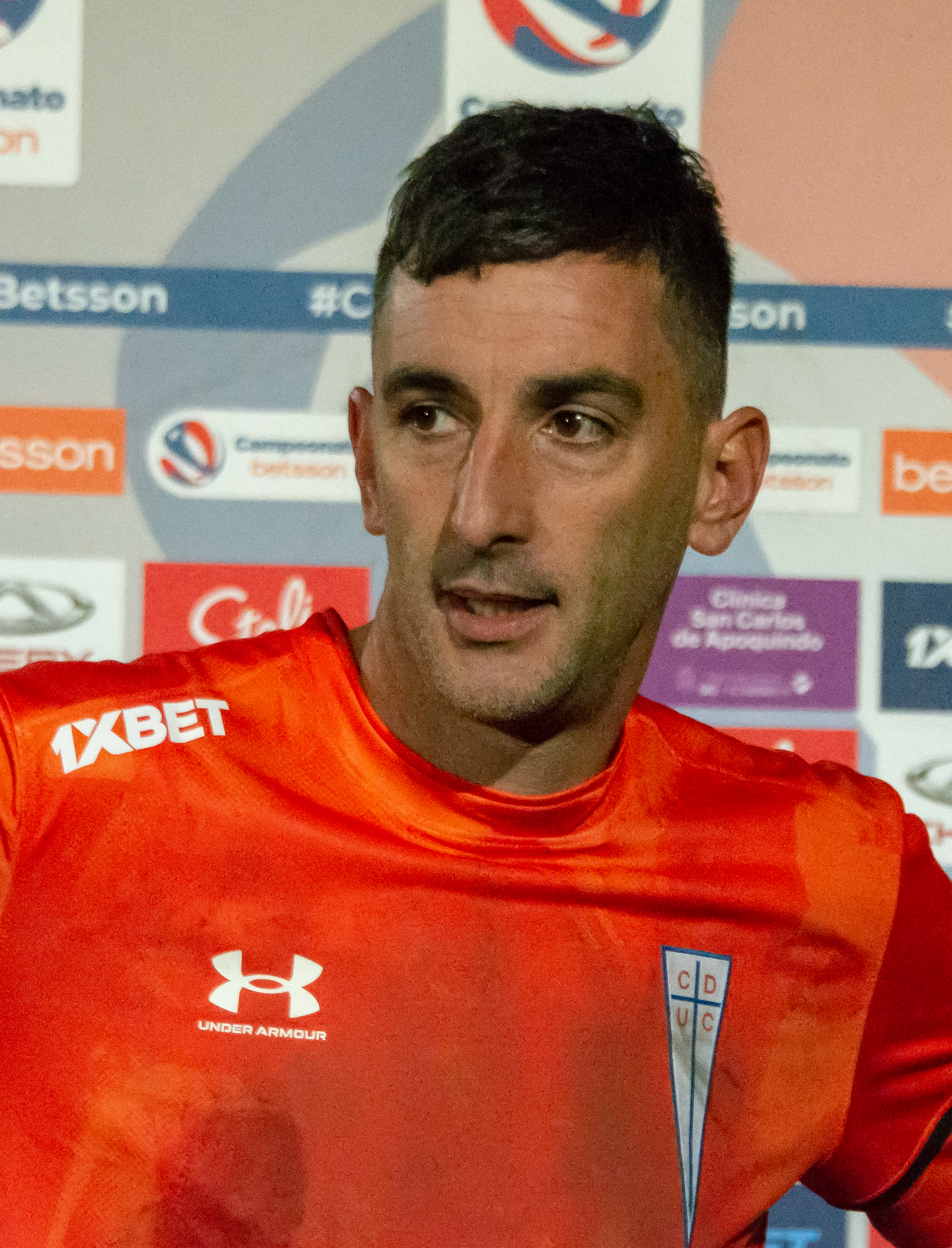
- Peranic with Universidad Católica in 2023

Personal information
- Full name: Nicolás Aldo Peranic
- Date of birth: 2 June 1985 (age 41)
- Place of birth: Ituzaingó, Argentina
- Height: 1.84 m (6 ft 0 in)
- Position: Goalkeeper

Team information
- Current team: San Luis

Senior career*
Years	Team	Apps	(Gls)
2005	Flandria	11	(0)
2006–2008	Acassuso	73	(0)
2008–2010	General Lamadrid	62	(0)
2010–2011	JJ Urquiza	23	(0)
2011–2014	Defensores Unidos	53	(0)
2012–2013	→ Almagro (loan)	4	(0)
2014	Almagro	18	(0)
2015–2016	Magallanes	37	(0)
2016–2017	Sportivo Italiano	7	(0)
2017–2018	San Marcos	29	(0)
2019–2021	Deportes Melipilla	68	(0)
2022–2023	Universidad Católica	16	(0)
2024	O'Higgins	18	(0)
2025	Deportes Limache	8	(0)
2026–	San Luis	0	(0)
- * Club domestic league appearances and goals as of 19 December 2025

Nicolás Aldo Peranic (born 2 June 1985) is an Argentine-Chilean footballer who plays as goalkeeper for Chilean club San Luis de Quillota.

== Career ==
Peranic spent two seasons with Universidad Católica in the Chilean Primera División until December 2023.

In 2024, Peranic joined O'Higgins. The next year, he switched to Deportes Limache.

On 18 December 2025, Peranic signed with San Luis de Quillota.

== Personal life ==
Peranic is of Croatian descent since his grandfather, Dinko Ante Peranić, came to Argentina from Yugoslavia in the middle of the 20th century and made his home in Chaco Province, changing his name to Domingo Antonio Peranic.

Both Peranic and his wife graduated as PE teachers.

Peranic holds dual Argentine-Chilean citizenship since he received his naturalization certificate in July 2022.

== Career statistics ==
=== Club ===
As of 18 June 2022

Club	Season	League			National Cup		Continental		Other		Total	
Club	Season	Division	Apps	Goals	Apps	Goals	Apps	Goals	Apps	Goals	Apps	Goals
Flandria	2005	Primera B Metropolitana	11	0	—		—		—		11	0
Acassuso	2006-08	Primera B Metropolitana	73	0	—		—		—		73	0
General Lamadrid	2008-10	Primera B Metropolitana	42	0	—		—		—		42	0
J.J. Urquiza	2010-11	Primera B Metropolitana	45	0	—		—		—		45	0
Defensores Unidos	2011-12	Primera B Metropolitana	—		—		—		—		0	0
Defensores Unidos	2013-14	Primera B Metropolitana	—		1	0	—		—		1	0
Defensores Unidos	Total		0	0	1	0	0	0	0	0	1	0
Almagro (loan)	2012-13	Primera B Metropolitana	3	0	—		—		—		3	0
Almagro (loan)	2013-14	Primera B Metropolitana	1	0	—		—		—		1	0
Almagro (loan)	Total		4	0	0	0	0	0	0	0	4	0
Almagro	2014	Primera B Metropolitana	18	0	—		—		—		18	0
Magallanes	2014-15	Primera B Chile	15	0	4	0	—		—		19	0
Magallanes	2015-16	Primera B Chile	22	0	—		—		—		22	0
Magallanes	Total		37	0	4	0	0	0	0	0	41	0
San Marcos de Arica	2017	Primera B Chile	1	0	4	0	—		—		5	0
San Marcos de Arica	2018	Primera B Chile	28	0	—		—		—		28	0
San Marcos de Arica	Total		29	0	4	0	0	0	0	0	33	0
Deportes Melipilla	2019	Primera B Chile	27	0	2	0	—		—		29	0
Deportes Melipilla	2020	Primera B Chile	34	0	—		—		—		34	0
Deportes Melipilla	2021	Primera División	32	0	2	0	—		—		34	0
Deportes Melipilla	Total		93	0	4	0	0	0	0	0	97	0
Universidad Católica	2022	Primera División	1	0	1	0	—		—		2	0
Career total			353	0	14	0	0	0	0	0	367	0
