= María Ballesteros =

Mexican swimmer (born 1956)

Personal information
- Born: 30 October 1956 (age 69)

Sport
- Sport: Swimming

María del Rosario Ballesteros (born 30 October 1956) is a Mexican former swimmer. She competed in two events at the 1972 Summer Olympics.
