= Diego Ossa =

Chilean footballer (born 2004)

Personal information
- Full name: Diego Ossa Vives
- Date of birth: 14 April 2004 (age 22)
- Place of birth: Santiago, Chile
- Height: 1.78 m (5 ft 10 in)
- Position: Striker

Team information
- Current team: Ocean City Nor'easters

Youth career
- Universidad Católica

College career
Years	Team	Apps	(Gls)
2024	SLCC Bruins	20	(12)
2025	James Madison Dukes		

Senior career*
Years	Team	Apps	(Gls)
2022–2024	Universidad Católica	3	(0)
2024	Asheville City SC		
2025–	Ocean City Nor’easters	0	(0)

International career^{‡}
2022	Chile U20	2	(0)
- * Club domestic league appearances and goals as of 8 May 2024 ‡ National team caps and goals as of 11 October 2022

Diego Ossa Vives (born 14 April 2004) is a Chilean professional footballer who plays as a striker for Ocean City Nor’easters in the USL League Two.

== Club career ==
Ossa made his professional debut playing for Universidad Católica in a match against Everton on 6 August 2022. At the beginning of 2024, he ended his contract with them to study in the United States.

After a stint with SLCC Bruins, Ossa joined Asheville City SC in the USL League Two in May 2024.

In May 2025, Ossa joined Ocean City Nor’easters.

== International career ==
Ossa represented Chile at under-20 level in the 2023 South American Championship.

== Personal life ==
As a high school student, Ossa attended the Monte Tabor School.
