= Independencia, Chile =

Commune in Santiago, Chile

Independencia
- Commune
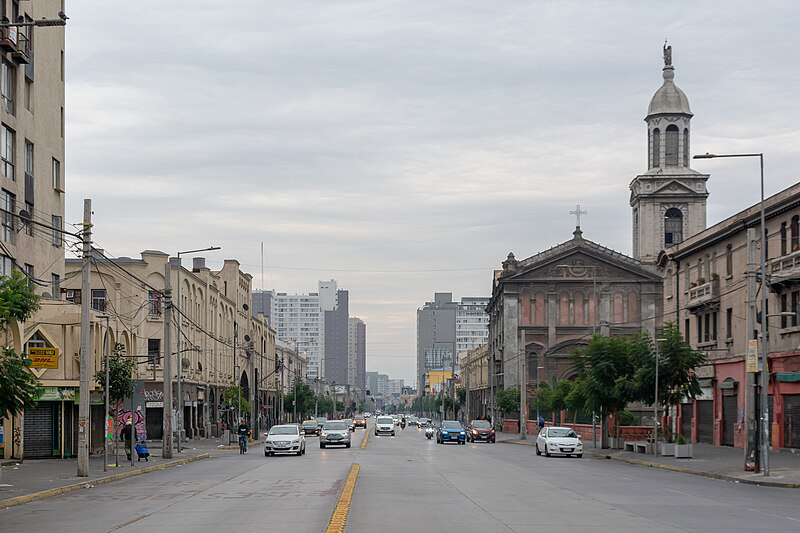
- Independencia Avenue

- Flag Coat of arms Map of Independencia commune within Greater Santiago Location in Chile
- Coordinates (city): 33°25′S 70°40′W
- Country: Chile
- Region: (Santiago Metropolitan Region) Santiago Metropolitan
- Province: Santiago
- Founded: 1945

Government
  - Type: Municipality
  - Mayor: Agustín Iglesias (Ind.)

Area
  - Commune: 7.4 km^{2} (2.9 sq mi)

Population (2024)
  - Commune: 116,943
  - Density: 16,000/km^{2} (41,000/sq mi)
  - Urban: 116,943
  - Rural: 0
- Time zone: UTC-4 (CLT)
  - Summer (DST): UTC-3 (CLST)
- Area code: 56 +
- Website: Municipality of Independencia

Independencia (Spanish pronunciation: [indepenˈdensja], meaning "independence") is a commune of Chile, situated in the Santiago Province of the Santiago Metropolitan Region. The commune's main thoroughfare is Independencia Avenue. In 2024 its population was 116,943.

== History ==
The Hipódromo Chile horse racetrack opened in 1906, and hosts the Gran Premio Hipódromo Chile and the Clásico St. Leger. One of the commune's greatest achievements was the construction of Estadio Independencia, owned by Club Deportivo Universidad Católica. The stadium, demolished in 1971, was used for Chilean and Latin American sports between 1945 and 1967. Another venue built in the commune was the Estadio Santa Laura, owned by Unión Española, which is still in use today.

== Demographics ==
As of the 2024 census, the commune has a population of 116,943, of which 48.7% are male and 51.3% are female. People under 15 years old make up 17.5% of the population, and people over 65 years old make up 11.0%. 100% of the population is urban.

Historical population
Year	Pop.	±% p.a.
1970	95,723	—
1982	86,724	−0.82%
1992	77,794	−1.08%
2002	65,479	−1.71%
2017	100,281	+2.88%
2024	116,943	+2.22%
Source: INE, Memoria Chilena

- Average annual household income: $30,355 (PPP, 2006)
- Population below poverty line: 6.0% (2006)
- Regional quality of life index: 78.95, mid-high, 15 out of 52 (2005)
- Human Development Index: 0.709, 111 out of 341 (2003)

=== Immigration ===
As of the 2024 census, Independencia has the highest share of immigrants out of all Chilean communes, as they make up 44.4% of the population: 42.0% are from South America, 2.1% from North America, 0.1% from Europe, 0.1% from Asia, 0.03% from Africa, and 0.004% from Oceania.

== Administration ==
As a commune, Independencia is a third-level administrative division of Chile administered by a municipal council, headed by a mayor who is directly elected every four years. The mayor for the 2024-2028 term is Agustín Iglesias (Independent). The municipal council has the following members:

- Leyla Pichara González (FA)
- Rosa Huilipan Castillo (PCCh)
- José Miguel Cuevas Fonsea (PS)
- Macarena Díaz Rossel (UDI)
- Manuel Jara Vargas (Ind/UDI)
- Sandra Álvarez Ruíz (RN)
- Rodrigo Barco Sánchez (RN)
- Máximo Breake Díaz (REP)

Within the electoral divisions of Chile, Independencia is represented in the Chamber of Deputies by Patricio Hales (PPD) and Claudia Nogueira (UDI) as part of the 19th electoral district, (together with Recoleta). The commune is represented in the Senate by Guido Girardi Lavín (PPD) and Jovino Novoa Vásquez (UDI) as part of the 7th senatorial constituency (Santiago-West).

== Gallery ==
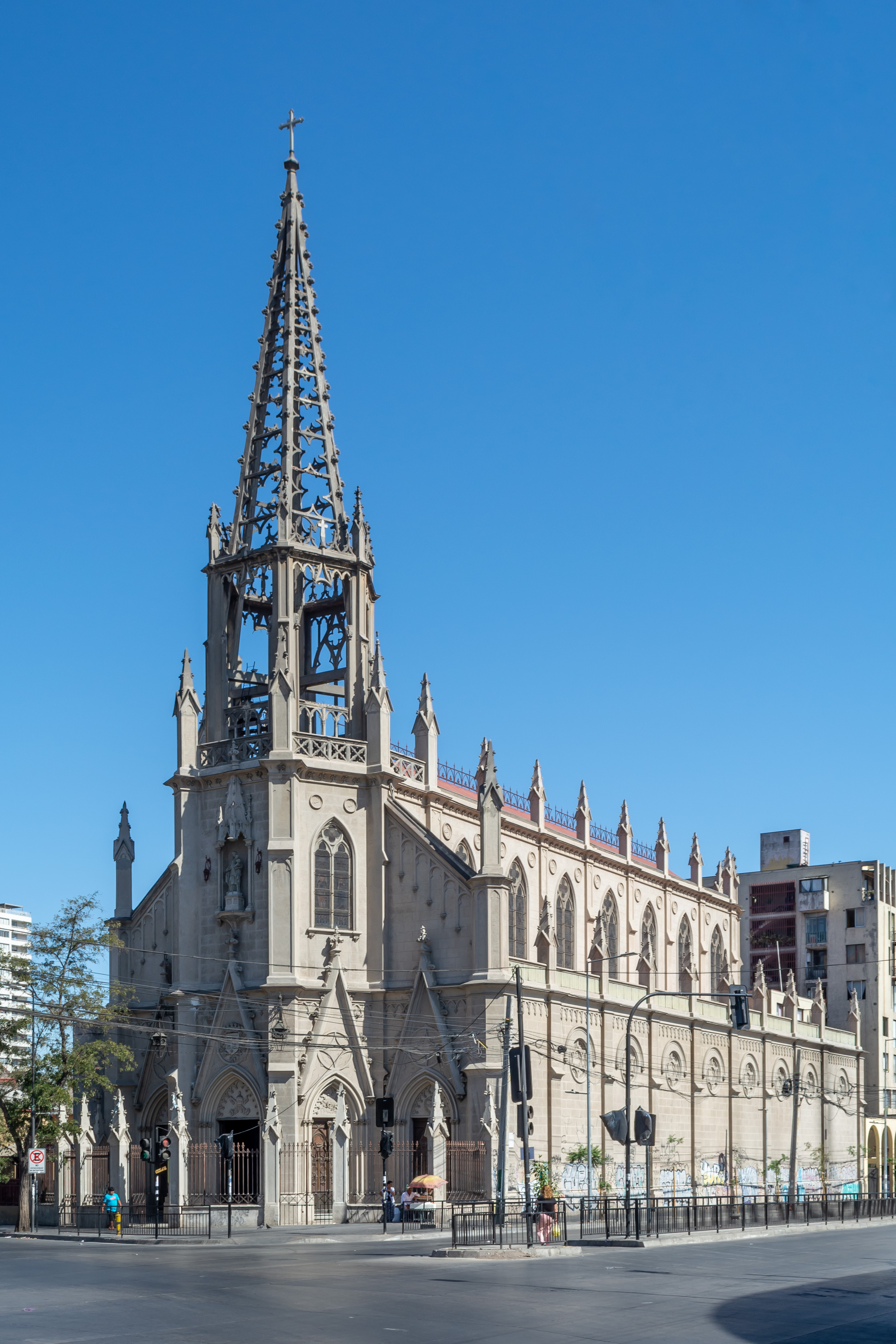
Infant Jesus of Prague Church

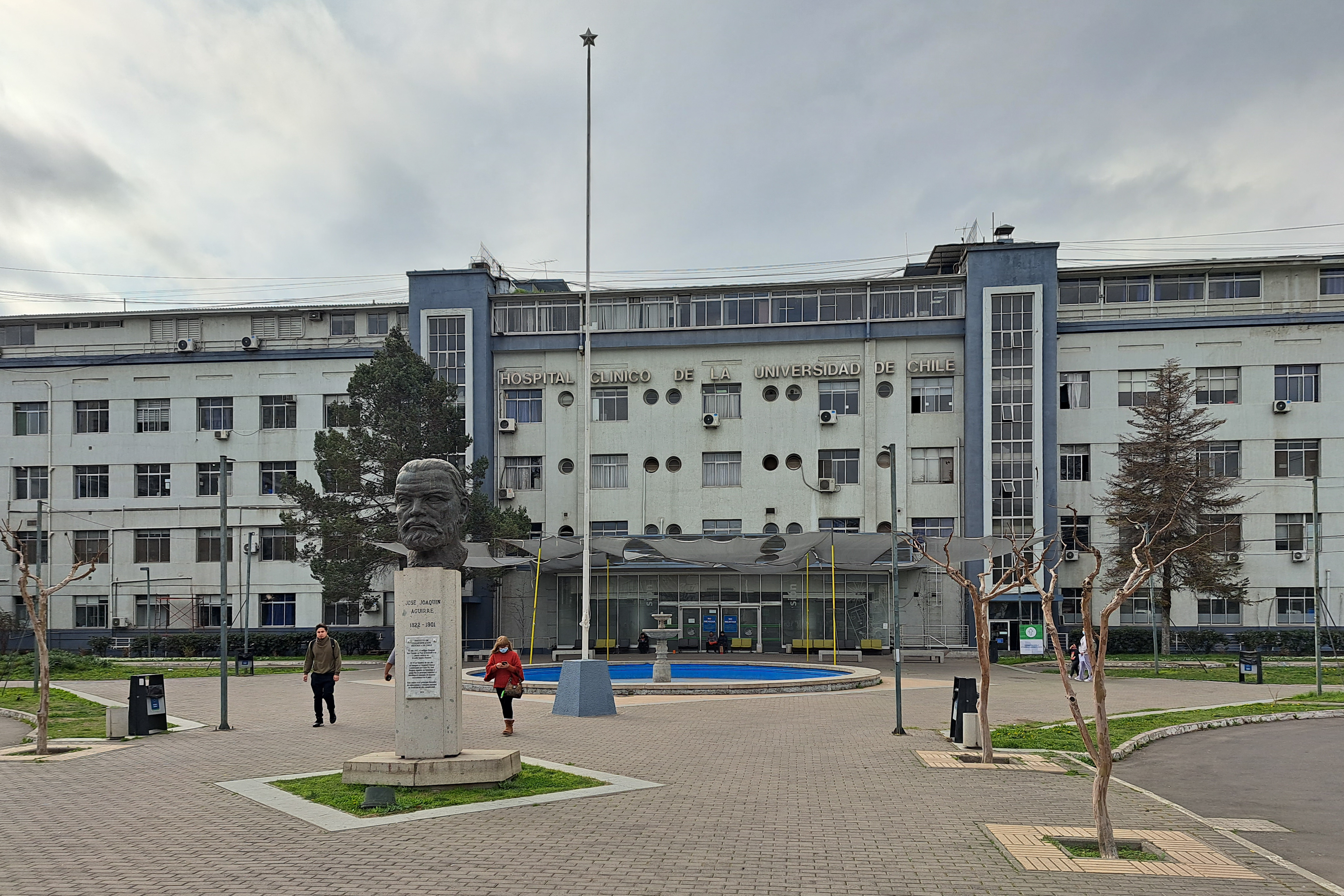
University of Chile Hospital

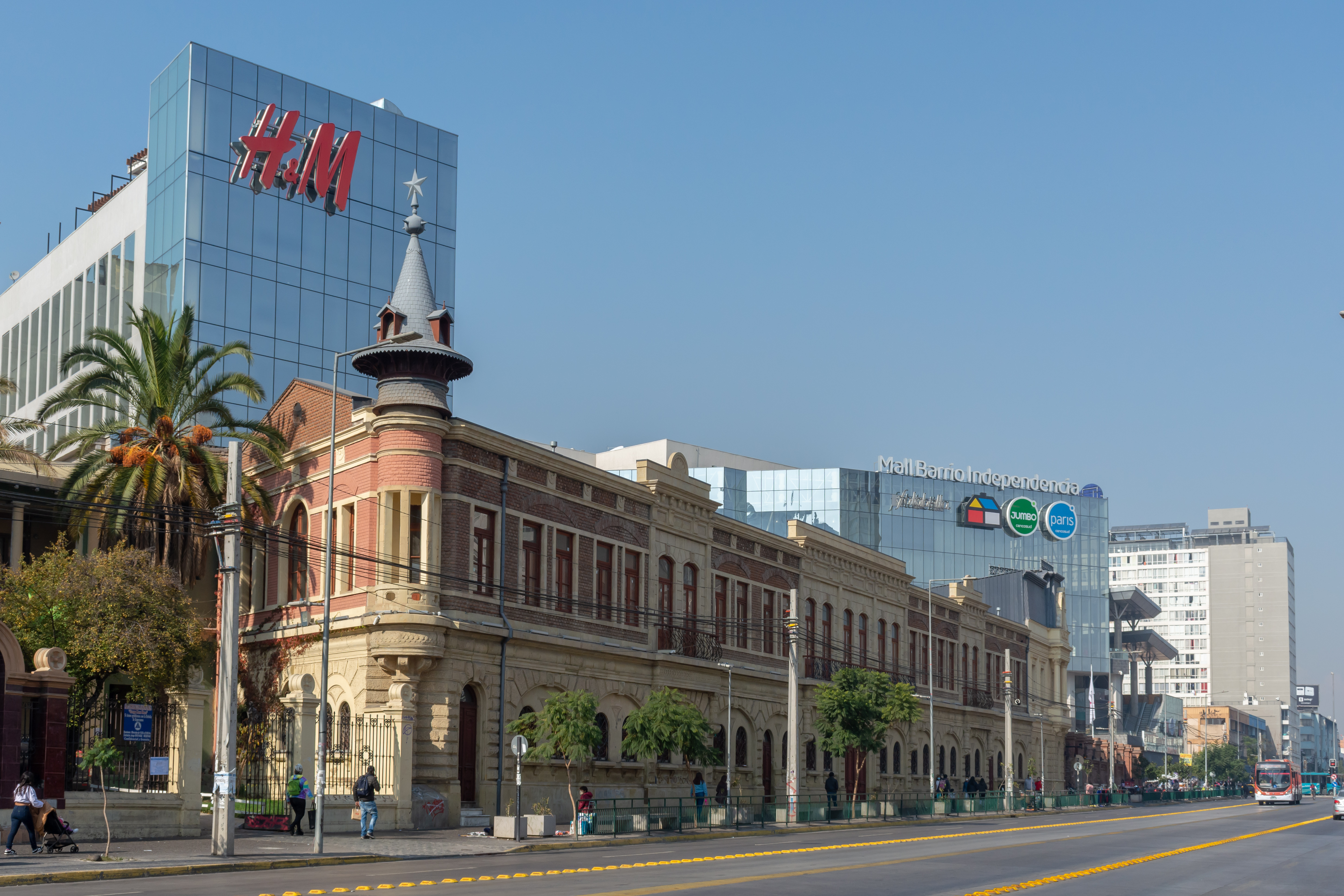
Ebner Brewery

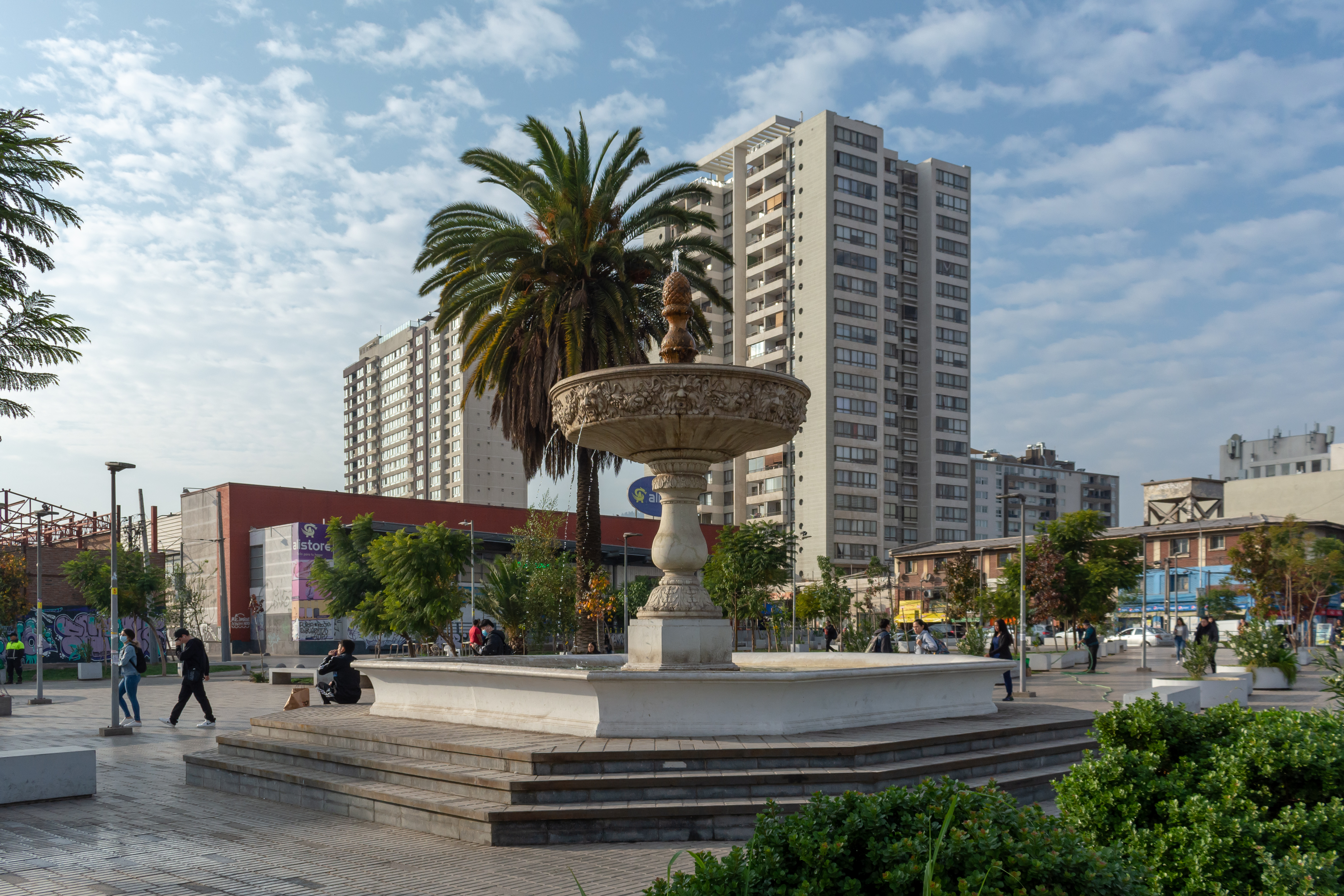
Chacabuco Square
