= Bruno Barticciotto =

Chilean footballer (born 2001)

Personal information
- Full name: Bruno Barticciotto Di Bartolo
- Date of birth: 7 May 2001 (age 25)
- Place of birth: Recoleta, Santiago, Chile
- Height: 1.78 m (5 ft 10 in)
- Position: Forward

Team information
- Current team: Huracán (on loan from Talleres)
- Number: 33

Youth career
- 2008–2009: Colo-Colo
- 2010–2020: Universidad Católica

Senior career*
| Years | Team | Apps | (Gls) |
| 2020–2022 | Universidad Católica | 5 | (0) |
| 2021 | → Palestino (loan) | 25 | (2) |
| 2022 | → Palestino (loan) | 14 | (7) |
| 2023 | Palestino | 14 | (3) |
| 2023– | Talleres | 36 | (7) |
| 2025 | → Santos Laguna (loan) | 21 | (8) |
| 2026– | → Huracán (loan) | 1 | (0) |

International career^{‡}
| 2020 | Chile U20 | 1 | (0) |
| 2022 | Chile U23 | 1 | (0) |
| 2023 | Chile | 1 | (2) |
- * Club domestic league appearances and goals as of 18:19, 5 September 2026 (UTC) ‡ National team caps and goals as of 13:41, 7 November 2026 (UTC)

Bruno Barticciotto Di Bartolo (born 7 May 2001) is a Chilean professional footballer who plays as a forward for Argentine club Huracán, on loan from Talleres.

== Club career ==
As a youth player, Barticciotto was with Colo-Colo while his father, Marcelo, was the manager of the first team. In 2010, he moved to Universidad Católica youth system, and made his professional debut playing for Palestino on March 28, 2021, scoring his first goal against Deportes Antofagasta in a 4–2 defeat. After being loaned at Palestino in 2021, he returned to the club on second half 2022 until the end of the season.

In August 2023, Barticciotto moved to Argentina and signed with Talleres de Córdoba. In February 2025, he was loaned out to Mexican club Santos Laguna. In September 2026, he was loaned out to Huracán on a deal until the end of the year.

== International career ==
He represented Chile U20 in a friendly tournament played in Teresópolis (Brazil) called Granja Comary International Tournament, making an appearance in the second match against Bolivia U20.

He represented Chile at under-23 level in a 1–0 win against Peru U23 on 31 August 2022, in the context of preparations for the 2023 Pan American Games.

At senior level, he received his first call-up for the friendly against Paraguay on 27 March 2023, but he made his debut in the match against Dominican Republic on 16 June of the same year, scoring two goals.

== Personal life ==
He is the son of Marcelo Barticciotto, an Argentine naturalized Chilean historical player of Colo-Colo.

== Career statistics ==
=== Club ===
As of 20 April 2025

| Club | Season | League | | | National Cup | | Continental | | Other | | Total | |
| Club | Season | Division | Apps | Goals | Apps | Goals | Apps | Goals | Apps | Goals | Apps | Goals |
|---|---|---|---|---|---|---|---|---|---|---|---|---|
| Universidad Católica | 2020 | C. Primera División | — | | 0 | 0 | 0 | 0 | — | | 0 | 0 |
| Universidad Católica | 2022 | C. Primera División | 5 | 0 | 0 | 0 | 2 (Note: Appearance(s) in the Copa Libertadores) | 0 | — | | 7 | 0 |
| Universidad Católica | Career total | | 5 | 0 | 0 | 0 | 2 | 0 | 0 | 0 | 7 | 0 |
| Palestino (loan) | 2021 | C. Primera División | 25 | 2 | 6 | 3 | 6 (Note: Appearance(s) in the Copa Sudamericana) | 0 | — | | 37 | 5 |
| Palestino (loan) | 2022 | C. Primera División | 14 | 7 | 1 | 0 | 0 | 0 | — | | 18 | 7 |
| Palestino | 2023 | C. Primera División | 14 | 3 | 2 | 1 | 7 | 1 | — | | 23 | 5 |
| Talleres | 2023 | Argentine Primera División | 7 | 0 | 1 | 0 | — | | — | | 8 | 0 |
| Talleres | 2024 | Argentine Primera División | 24 | 7 | 1 | 0 | 5 | 0 | — | | 30 | 7 |
| Talleres | Total | | 31 | 7 | 2 | 0 | 5 | 0 | — | | 38 | 7 |
| Santos Laguna (loan) | 2024–25 | Liga MX | 10 | 6 | — | | — | | — | | 10 | 6 |
| Career total | | | 99 | 25 | 11 | 4 | 20 | 1 | 0 | 0 | 130 | 30 |

=== International ===
As of match played 16 June 2023

Appearances and goals by national team and year
| National team | Year | Apps | Goals |
|---|---|---|---|
| Chile | 2023 | 1 | 2 |
| Total | | 1 | 2 |

List of international goals scored by Bruno Barticciotto
| No. | Date | Venue | Opponent | Score | Result | Competition |
|---|---|---|---|---|---|---|
| 1. | 16 June 2023 | Estadio Sausalito, Viña del Mar, Chile | Dominican Republic | 4–0 | 5–0 | Friendlies |
| 2. | 16 June 2023 | Estadio Sausalito, Viña del Mar, Chile | Dominican Republic | 5–0 | 5–0 | Friendlies |

== Honours ==
Universidad Católica

- Primera División: 2020
