= Jorge Ortiz (Chilean footballer) =

Chilean footballer (born 2004)

Personal information
- Full name: Jorge Eduardo Ortiz Torres
- Date of birth: 23 January 2004 (age 22)
- Place of birth: Hijuelas, Chile
- Height: 1.70 m (5 ft 7 in)
- Position: Striker

Team information
- Current team: Deportes Copiapó (on loan from Universidad Católica)
- Number: 11

Youth career
- Universidad Católica

Senior career*
Years	Team	Apps	(Gls)
2023–	Universidad Católica	18	(1)
2025	→ Deportes La Serena (loan)	2	(0)
2026–	→ Deportes Copiapó (loan)	1	(0)
- * Club domestic league appearances and goals as of 23 February 2026

Jorge Eduardo Ortiz Torres (born 23 January 2004) is a Chilean professional footballer who plays as a striker for Deportes Copiapó on loan from Universidad Católica.

== Club career ==
Ortiz made his professional debut playing for Universidad Catolica in a 2023 against O'higgins on 22 April 2023. He was loaned out to Deportes La Serena for the 2025 season. The next season, he was loaned out to Deportes Copiapó in the Chilean second level.
