= Aaron Astudillo =

Venezuelan-born Chilean footballer (born 2000)

Personal information
- Full name: Aaron Sebastián Astudillo Quiñones
- Date of birth: 17 April 2000 (age 26)
- Place of birth: Puerto Ordaz, Venezuela
- Height: 1.84 m (6 ft 0 in)
- Position: Right-back

Team information
- Current team: Cobresal

Youth career
- 2015–2020: Universidad Católica

Senior career*
Years	Team	Apps	(Gls)
2020–2024	Universidad Católica	10	(0)
2021	→ Deportes Melipilla (loan)	9	(1)
2023	→ Deportes Recoleta (loan)	18	(1)
2025–	Cobresal	0	(0)
- * Club domestic league appearances and goals as of 10 December 2024

Aaron Sebastián Astudillo Quiñones (born 17 April 2000) is a Venezuelan naturalized Chilean professional footballer who plays as a right-back for Chilean club Cobresal.

== Career ==
Astudillo debuted the year 2020 in the match against Everton in Estadio Sausalito, on the following date.

After ending his contract with Universidad Católica, Astudillo joined Cobresal for the 2025 season.

== Career statistics ==
=== Club ===
As of 21 May 2022

Club	Season	League			National cup		Continental		Other		Total	
Club	Season	Division	Apps	Goals	Apps	Goals	Apps	Goals	Apps	Goals	Apps	Goals
Universidad Católica	2020	C. Primera División	1	0	—		—		—		1	0
Universidad Católica	2022	C. Primera División	2	0	0	0	1 (Note: Appearance(s) in the Copa Libertadores)	0	—		3	0
Universidad Católica	Total club		3	0	0	0	1	0	1	0	4	0
Deportes Melipilla (loan)	2021	C. Primera División	9	1	2	0	—		—		11	1
Career total			12	1	2	0	24	0	1	0	15	1

== Honours ==
=== Club ===
Universidad Católica

- Primera División de Chile: 2020
