= 2025 Club Deportivo Palestino season =

Palestino
2025 season
- Manager: Lucas Bovaglio
- Stadium: Estadio Municipal de La Cisterna
- Liga de Primera: 6th
- Copa Chile: Group stage
- Copa Sudamericana: Knockout Play-offs
- Top goalscorer: League: Joe Abrigo (6); All: Junior Marabel (9)
- Average home league attendance: 1,978

The 2025 season was the 105th in the history of Club Deportivo Palestino and their eighth consecutive campaign in Chile's top flight. In addition to competing in the Primera División and Copa Chile, the club also took part in the Copa Sudamericana.

== Transfers ==
=== In ===
Pos.	Player	Transferred from	Fee	Date	Source
GK	(Chile) Sebastián Pérez	(Chile) Universidad Católica	Free	1 January 2025	
DF	(Chile) Jason León	(Chile) Santiago Wanderers	Free	1 January 2025	
MF	(Chile) Pablo Parra	(Chile) Unión La Calera	Free	1 January 2025	
MF	(Argentina) Julián Fernández	(Argentina) Newell's Old Boys	Free	3 January 2025	
FW	(Uruguay) Junior Arias	(Argentina) San Martín de Tucumán	Free	14 January 2025	
DF	(Argentina) Fernando Meza	(Argentina) Argentinos Juniors	Free	27 February 2025	
FW	(Chile) Ronnie Fernández	(Malaysia) Selangor	Free	21 May 2025	

=== Out ===
Pos.	Player	Transferred to	Fee	Date	Source
GK	(Argentina) César Rigamonti	(Argentina) Gimnasia y Esgrima de Mendoza	Released	10 December 2024	
MF	(Argentina) Nicolás Linares	(Brazil) Amazonas	Free	28 February 2025	
DF	(Chile) Iván Román	(Brazil) Atlético Mineiro	€1,920,000	28 February 2025	
DF	(Chile) Alan Riquelme	(Chile) San Antonio Unido	Loan	2 March 2025	

== Competitions ==
=== Overview ===
Competition	First match	Last match	Starting round	Final position	Record							
Competition	First match	Last match	Starting round	Final position	Pld	W	D	L	GF	GA	GD	Win %
Liga de Primera	15 February 2025	5 December 2025	Matchday 1	6th	30	14	7	9	42	31	+11	46.67
Copa Chile	27 January 2025	10 May 2025	Group stage	Group stage	6	1	2	3	10	15	−5	16.67
Copa Sudamericana	4 March 2025	23 July 2025	First stage	Knockout play-offs	9	3	1	5	10	16	−6	33.33
Total					45	18	10	17	62	62	+0	40.00

Last updated: 8 December 2025
Source: Competitions

=== Liga de Primera ===
==== League table ====
Pos	Team	Pld	W	D	L	GF	GA	GD	Pts	Qualification or relegation
4	Universidad de Chile	30	17	4	9	58	32	+26	55	Qualification for Copa Sudamericana first stage
5	Audax Italiano	30	16	4	10	51	43	+8	52	Qualification for Copa Sudamericana first stage
6	Palestino	30	14	7	9	42	31	+11	49	Qualification for Copa Sudamericana first stage
7	Cobresal	30	14	5	11	38	38	0	47	Qualification for Copa Sudamericana first stage
8	Colo-Colo	30	12	8	10	46	36	+10	44	

Source: Campeonato Chileno, Soccerway
Rules for classification: 1) Points, 2) Playoff game (only if needed to decide championship between two teams), 3) Goal difference, 4) Matches won, 5) Goals for, 6) Away goals for, 7) Red cards, 8) Yellow cards, 9) Drawing of lots.

==== Results by round ====
Round	1	2	3	4	5	6	7	8	9	10
Ground	H	A	H	A	H	A	H	A	H	A
Result	W	W	L	W	W	D	W	L	L	W
Position										

Updated to match(es) played on 3 May 2025. Source:
A = Away; H = Home; W = Win; D = Draw; L = Loss

==== Matches ====
15 February 2025 1	Palestino	2–1	Cobresal	Santiago
	Carrasco 61'; Parra 75'	Report	Henríquez 88'	Stadium: Estadio Municipal de La Cisterna; Referee: Reinerio Alvarado Gonzalez

21 February 2025 2	Unión Española	0–3	Palestino	Santiago
		Report	Abrigo 42', 83', 88'	Stadium: Estadio Santa Laura; Referee: Fernando Vejar Díaz

1 March 2025 3	Palestino	0–2	Audax Italiano	Santiago
		Report	Valencia 31'; Orellana 90+10'	Stadium: Estadio Municipal de La Cisterna; Referee: Nicolas Millas Lopez

8 March 2025 4	Deportes Iquique	1–3	Palestino	Iquique
	Soto 16'	Report	Benítez 9'; Abrigo 31'; Tapia 79'	Stadium: Estadio Tierra de Campeones

16 March 2025 5	Palestino	2–0	Ñublense	Santiago
	Marabel 42'; Ceza 85'	Report		Stadium: Estadio Municipal de La Cisterna; Referee: Francisco Gilabert Morales

27 March 2025 6	Colo-Colo	1–1	Palestino	Macul
18:15 UTC−3	Oroz 64'	Report	Marabel 21'	Stadium: Estadio Monumental David Arellano

14 April 2025 7	Palestino	1–0	Unión La Calera	Santiago
16:00 UTC−3	Marabel 84'	Report		Stadium: Estadio Municipal de La Cisterna; Referee: Benjamín Saravia

20 April 2025 8	O'Higgins	1–0	Palestino	San Fernando
16:00	Morales 65'	Report		Stadium: Estadio Municipal Jorge Silva Valenzuela

27 April 2025 9	Palestino	2–3	Universidad de Chile	Santiago
15:00	Tapia 69'; Marabel 90+8' (pen.)	Report	Aránguiz 13' (pen.); Fernández 65'; Contreras 90'	Stadium: Estadio Municipal de La Cisterna

3 May 2025 10	Everton	1–2	Palestino	Viña del Mar
12:30	Madrid 45+2'	Report	Abrigo 11'; Marabel 23'	Stadium: Estadio Sausalito

18 May 2025 11	Deportes Limache	0–1	Palestino	Quillota
15:00		Report	Arias 59'	Stadium: Estadio Municipal Lucio Fariña Fernández; Referee: Benjamin Saravia Retamal

24 May 2025 12	Coquimbo Unido	0–0	Palestino	Coquimbo
20:00		Report		Stadium: Estadio Municipal Francisco Sánchez Rumoroso; Referee: Cristian Garay

1 June 2025 13	Palestino	1–1	Universidad Católica	Santiago
15:00	Carrasco 32'	Report	Zampedri 78'	Stadium: Estadio Municipal de La Cisterna

14 June 2025 14	Palestino	2–1	Deportes La Serena	Santiago
12:30	Abrigo 57'; Carrasco 64'	Report	Jara 82'	Stadium: Estadio Municipal de La Cisterna; Referee: Felipe González

21 June 2025 15	Huachipato	2–2	Palestino	Talcahuano
17:30	Martínez 50'; Altamirano 64'	Report	Suárez 29'; Ceza 45'	Stadium: Estadio Huachipato; Referee: José Cabero Rebolledo

27 July 2025 17	Palestino	1–0	Unión Española	Santiago
15:00	Carrasco 63'	Report		Stadium: Estadio Municipal de La Cisterna; Referee: Juan Lara

1 August 2025 18	Audax Italiano	1–1	Palestino	Santiago
19:00	Fuentes 46'	Report	Abrigo 83'	Stadium: Estadio Bicentenario de La Florida; Referee: Hector Jona Gamboa

8 August 2025 19	Palestino	2–0	Deportes Iquique	Santiago
15:00	Castro 48'; Marabel 86'	Report		Stadium: Estadio Municipal de La Cisterna; Referee: Cristian Garay

16 August 2025 20	Ñublense	1–0	Palestino	Chillán
12:00	Graciani 4'	Report		Stadium: Estadio Bicentenario Municipal Nelson Oyarzún; Referee: Rodrigo Carvajal Molina

22 August 2025 21	Palestino	0–0	Colo-Colo	Santiago
15:00		Report		Stadium: Estadio Municipal de La Cisterna; Referee: Hector Jona Gamboa

29 August 2025 22	Unión La Calera	1–2	Palestino	La Calera
19:00	Sáez 58'	Report	Garguez 21'; Arias 89' (pen.)	Stadium: Estadio Municipal Nicolás Chahuán Nazar; Referee: Manuel Vergara Rodriguez

7 September 2025 16	Cobresal	2–1	Palestino	El Salvador
14:00	Coelho 45'; Munder 79'	Report	Tiznado 90+7' (o.g.)	Stadium: Estadio El Cobre; Referee: José Cabero Rebolledo

13 September 2025 23	Palestino	1–2	O'Higgins	Santiago
14:00	Abrigo 70'	Report	Romero 7', 66'	Stadium: Estadio Municipal de La Cisterna; Referee: Piero Maza Gomez

13 October 2025 24	Universidad de Chile	2–1	Palestino	Santiago
15:00	Di Yorio 4', 18'	Report	Meza 32'	Stadium: Estadio Santa Laura; Referee: Miguel Araos Riquelme

24 October 2025 25	Palestino	2–1	Everton	Santiago
16:00	León 61'; Arias 72'	Report	Sosa 53' (pen.)	Stadium: Estadio Municipal de La Cisterna; Referee: Cristian Galaz Sepulveda

3 November 2025 26	Palestino	2–1	Deportes Limache	Santiago
16:00	Marabel 36'; Arias 59'	Report	Pons 56'	Stadium: Estadio Municipal de La Cisterna; Attendance: 1,854; Referee: Piero Maza Gomez

8 November 2025 27	Palestino	1–2	Coquimbo Unido	Santiago
17:30	Arias 73'	Report	Camargo 68'; Salinas 85'	Stadium: Estadio Municipal de La Cisterna; Attendance: 1,921; Referee: Nicolás Gamboa Reyes

22 November 2025 28	Universidad Católica	2–1	Palestino	Las Condes
20:30	Zampedri 33' (pen.); Bello 59'	Report	Marabel 56'	Stadium: Claro Arena; Attendance: 15,832; Referee: Mathias Riquelme Sepúlveda

29 November 2025 29	Deportes La Serena	0–3	Palestino	La Serena
18:0		Report	Bizama 71'; Garguez 74'; Abrigo 90+2'	Stadium: Estadio La Portada; Attendance: 2,712; Referee: Gastón Philippe Noriega

5 December 2025 30	Palestino	2–2	Huachipato	Santiago
20:00	Abrigo 45+4'; Arias 90+5'	Report	Martínez 18'; Garrido 82'	Stadium: Estadio Municipal de La Cisterna; Referee: Hector Jona Gamboa

=== Copa Chile ===
==== Group stage ====
Group E

Pos	Team	Pld	W	D	L	GF	GA	GD	Pts	Qualification	AUD	DCO	UE	PAL
1	Audax Italiano	6	3	3	0	9	4	+5	12	Advance to the knockout stage	—	2–1	3–1	2–2
2	Deportes Concepción	6	2	2	2	10	13	−3	8	Advance to the knockout stage	0–0	—	1–0	3–2
3	Unión Española	6	2	1	3	10	7	+3	7		0–0	5–1	—	3–0
4	Palestino	6	1	2	3	10	15	−5	5		0–2	4–4	2–1	—

Source: Campeonato Chileno, Soccerway
Rules for classification: 1) Points; 2) Goal difference; 3) Matches won; 4) Goals for; 5) Away goals for; 6) Red cards; 7) Yellow cards; 8) Copa Chile ranking; 9) Drawing of lots.

Matches

27 January 2025 1	Palestino	0–2	Audax Italiano	Santiago
18:00 UTC−3				Stadium: Estadio Municipal de La Cisterna

1 February 2025 2	Palestino	2–1	Unión Española	Santiago
18:00 UTC−3				Stadium: Estadio Municipal de La Cisterna

23 March 2025 4	Concepción	3–2	Palestino	Concepción
12:00 UTC−3				Stadium: Estadio Ester Roa

6 April 2025 5	Unión Española	3–0	Palestino	La Pintana
17:00 UTC−3	Jeraldino 65'; Jáuregui 79'; Aránguiz 87'		León (red card) 90+2'	Stadium: Estadio Municipal de La Pintana

30 April 2025 3	Palestino	4–4	Concepción	Santiago
15:00 UTC−4				Stadium: Estadio Municipal de La Cisterna

10 May 2025 6	Audax Italiano	2–2	Palestino	Santiago
20:00				Stadium: Estadio Bicentenario de La Florida

=== Copa Sudamericana ===
==== First stage ====
4 March 2025	Universidad Católica (Chile)	1–1 (4–5 p)	(Chile) Palestino	Coquimbo
21:30 UTC−5	Zampedri 88'	Report	Carrasco 11'; Fernández (yellow card) (yellow-red card)	Stadium: Estadio Francisco Sánchez Rumoroso; Attendance: 2,706; Referee: Yael Falcón Pérez (Argentina)
	Penalties
	Zampedri (penalty scored); Jader (penalty scored); Cuevas (penalty scored); D. Valencia (penalty scored); Ampuero (penalty missed)		(penalty scored) Martínez; (penalty scored) Tapia; (penalty scored) Meza; (penalty scored) Zúñiga; (penalty scored) Marabel

==== Group stage ====
The draw was conducted on 17 March.

Pos	Team	Pld	W	D	L	GF	GA	GD	Pts	Qualification
1	(Ecuador) Mushuc Runa	6	5	1	0	12	4	+8	16	Advance to round of 16
2	(Chile) Palestino	6	3	0	3	9	9	0	9	Advance to knockout round play-offs
3	(Brazil) Cruzeiro	6	1	2	3	5	7	−2	5	
4	(Argentina) Unión	6	1	1	4	2	8	−6	4	

Source: CONMEBOL
Rules for classification: 1) Points; 2) Goal difference; 3) Goals scored; 4) Away goals scored; 5) CONMEBOL ranking.

3 April 2025 1	Mushuc Runa (Ecuador)	3–2	(Chile) Palestino	Riobamba, Ecuador
21:00 UTC−5	Haquin 41'; Simisterra 75'; Alonso 82'	Report	Marabel 71'; Carrasco 90+3'	Stadium: Estadio Olímpico de Riobamba; Attendance: 2,918; Referee: Yender Herrera (Venezuela)

9 April 2025 2	Palestino (Chile)	2–0	(Argentina) Unión	Santiago
19:00 UTC−3	Carrasco 12' (pen.); Marabel 90+6'	Report	Ham (yellow card) 10' (yellow-red card) 68'	Stadium: Estadio Nacional Julio Martínez Prádanos; Attendance: 10,295; Referee: Carlos Benítez (Paraguay)

24 April 2025 3	Palestino (Chile)	2–1	(Brazil) Cruzeiro	Coquimbo
21:30 UTC−3	Suárez 40'; Arias 86'	Report	Carlos Eduardo 83'	Stadium: Estadio Municipal Francisco Sánchez Rumoroso; Attendance: 3,930; Referee: Mathías De Armas (Uruguay)

7 May 2025 4	Unión (Argentina)	1–2	(Chile) Palestino	Santa Fe, Argentina
19:00 UTC−3	Gamba 49'	Report	Marabel 84', 88'	Stadium: Estadio 15 de Abril; Attendance: Referee: Derlis López (Paraguay)

14 May 2025 5	Cruzeiro (Brazil)	2–1	(Chile) Palestino	Belo Horizonte, Brazil
21:30 UTC−3	Bolasie 69'; Gabriel 90'	Report	Martínez 7'	Stadium: Mineirão; Attendance: 9,698; Referee: Kevin Ortega (Peru)

28 May 2025 6	Palestino (Chile)	0–2	(Ecuador) Mushuc Runa	Santiago
20:30 UTC−4		Report	Orejuela 70'; Penilla 88'	Stadium: Estadio Bicentenario de La Florida; Referee: Hernán Heras (Uruguay)

==== Final stages ====
===== Knockout Play-offs =====
16 July 2025 First leg	Bolívar (Bolivia)	3–0	(Chile) Palestino	La Paz, Bolivia
18:00 UTC−4	Robson Matheus 58'; Cauteruccio 90+10' (pen.); Melgar 90+13'	Report		Stadium: Estadio Hernando Siles; Referee: Flavio de Souza (Brazil)

23 July 2025 Second leg	Palestino (Chile)	0–3 (0–6 agg.)	(Bolivia) Bolívar	Santiago
18:00 UTC−4		Report	Cataño 24'; Sagredo 28'; Cauteruccio 66'	Stadium: Estadio Nacional Julio Martínez Prádanos; Referee: Derlis López (Paraguay)
