= 2025 Copa Sudamericana first stage =

The 2025 Copa Sudamericana first stage was played from 4 to 6 March 2025. A total of 32 teams competed in the first stage to decide 16 of the 32 places in the group stage of the 2025 Copa Sudamericana.

== Draw ==
The draw for the first stage was held on 19 December 2024, 12:00 PYT (UTC−3), at the CONMEBOL Convention Centre in Luque, Paraguay.

For the first stage, the 32 teams involved were divided into eight pots according to their national association. The 32 teams were drawn into 16 ties, with the four teams from each national association being drawn against a rival from the same association in two ties per association. The first team drawn in each tie hosted the match.

First stage draw
Bolivia	Chile	Colombia	Ecuador
(Bolivia) Universitario de Vinto; (Bolivia) Aurora; (Bolivia) Nacional Potosí; (Bolivia) GV San José	(Chile) Palestino; (Chile) Universidad Católica; (Chile) Unión Española; (Chile) Everton	(Colombia) Millonarios; (Colombia) Once Caldas; (Colombia) Junior; (Colombia) América de Cali	(Ecuador) Universidad Católica; (Ecuador) Aucas; (Ecuador) Mushuc Runa; (Ecuador) Orense
Paraguay	Peru	Uruguay	Venezuela
(Paraguay) Guaraní; (Paraguay) 2 de Mayo; (Paraguay) Sportivo Luqueño; (Paraguay) Sportivo Ameliano	(Peru) Cusco; (Peru) Cienciano; (Peru) Atlético Grau; (Peru) ADT	(Uruguay) Cerro Largo; (Uruguay) Danubio; (Uruguay) Racing; (Uruguay) Montevideo Wanderers	(Venezuela) Metropolitanos; (Venezuela) Deportivo La Guaira; (Venezuela) Academia Puerto Cabello; (Venezuela) Caracas

1. ^{†} The identity of the teams Bolivia 2, Bolivia 3, Bolivia 4 and Colombia 1 was not known at the time of the draw.

== Format ==
In the first stage, each tie was played on a single-leg basis, with the winner being decided in a penalty shoot-out in case of a draw after 90 minutes.

The 16 winners of the first stage advanced to the group stage to join the 12 teams directly qualified for that stage (six from Argentina and six from Brazil), and four teams transferred from the Copa Libertadores (the four teams eliminated in the third stage of qualifying).

== Matches ==
Matches were played on 4–6 March 2025.

Team 1	Score	Team 2
Universitario de Vinto (Bolivia)	0–1	(Bolivia) Nacional Potosí
Aurora (Bolivia)	0–1	(Bolivia) GV San José
Universidad Católica (Chile)	1–1 (4–5 p)	(Chile) Palestino
Unión Española (Chile)	2–2 (3–1 p)	(Chile) Everton
Junior (Colombia)	2–2 (3–4 p)	(Colombia) América de Cali
Once Caldas (Colombia)	1–0	(Colombia) Millonarios
Mushuc Runa (Ecuador)	2–1	(Ecuador) Orense
Universidad Católica (Ecuador)	0–0 (4–2 p)	(Ecuador) Aucas
Sportivo Luqueño (Paraguay)	2–0	(Paraguay) Sportivo Ameliano
Guaraní (Paraguay)	2–0	(Paraguay) 2 de Mayo
ADT (Peru)	1–1 (5–6 p)	(Peru) Cienciano
Atlético Grau (Peru)	0–0 (4–2 p)	(Peru) Cusco
Racing (Uruguay)	0–0 (4–2 p)	(Uruguay) Montevideo Wanderers
Cerro Largo (Uruguay)	2–2 (4–3 p)	(Uruguay) Danubio
Academia Puerto Cabello (Venezuela)	3–0	(Venezuela) Metropolitanos
Deportivo La Guaira (Venezuela)	0–2	(Venezuela) Caracas

4 March 2025
20:30 UTC−4 (Note: The Universitario de Vinto v Nacional Potosí match, originally scheduled for 4 March 2025, 18:00 local time, was pushed back to 20:30 local time.)

Universitario de Vinto (Bolivia)	0–1	(Bolivia) Nacional Potosí
	Report	Camacho 31' (o.g.)

Estadio Félix Capriles, Cochabamba (Note: Universitario de Vinto played their home match at Estadio Félix Capriles, Cochabamba instead of their regular stadium Estadio Hipólito Lazarte, Vinto which did not meet CONMEBOL requirements.)
Attendance: 1,047
Referee: Augusto Aragón (Ecuador)

Nacional Potosí advanced to the group stage (BOL 1).

5 March 2025
18:00 UTC−4

Aurora (Bolivia)	0–1	(Bolivia) GV San José
	Report	Calero 62'

Estadio Félix Capriles, Cochabamba
Attendance: 3,870
Referee: José Cabero (Chile)

GV San José advanced to the group stage (BOL 2).

4 March 2025
21:30 UTC−3

Universidad Católica (Chile)	1–1	(Chile) Palestino
Zampedri 88'	Report	Carrasco 11'
Penalties
Zampedri (penalty scored); Jader (penalty scored); Cuevas (penalty scored); D. Valencia (penalty scored); Ampuero (penalty missed)	4–5	(penalty scored) Martínez; (penalty scored) Tapia; (penalty scored) Meza; (penalty scored) Zúñiga; (penalty scored) Marabel

Estadio Municipal Francisco Sánchez Rumoroso, Coquimbo (Note: Universidad Católica played their home match at Estadio Municipal Francisco Sánchez Rumoroso, Coquimbo (originally scheduled at Estadio Nacional Julio Martínez Prádanos, Santiago and later moved to Estadio Sausalito, Viña del Mar) instead of their regular stadium Estadio San Carlos de Apoquindo, Santiago which is being rebuilt.)
Attendance: 2,706
Referee: Yael Falcón Pérez (Argentina)

Palestino advanced to the group stage (CHI 1).

5 March 2025
19:00 UTC−3

Unión Española (Chile)	2–2	(Chile) Everton
Jeraldino 8'; Aránguiz 45+1' (pen.)	Report	I. Ramírez 2', 81' (pen.)
Penalties
Uribe (penalty scored); Suárez (penalty scored); Carvallo (penalty missed); Díaz (penalty scored)	3–1	(penalty missed) Baeza; (penalty missed) Moya; (penalty missed) Soto; (penalty scored) Piñeiro

Estadio Bicentenario de La Florida, Santiago (Note: Unión Española played their home match at Estadio Bicentenario de La Florida, Santiago instead of their regular stadium Estadio Santa Laura-Universidad SEK, Santiago.)
Attendance: 3,959
Referee: Paulo Zanovelli (Brazil)

Unión Española advanced to the group stage (CHI 2).

6 March 2025 (Note: The Junior v América de Cali match, originally scheduled for 4 March 2025, was rescheduled to 6 March 2025 to avoid a clash with the Barranquilla Carnival.)
19:30 UTC−5

Junior (Colombia)	2–2	(Colombia) América de Cali
Paiva 54', 71'	Report	Lucumí 38'; Vergara 44'
Penalties
González (penalty scored); Barrera (penalty scored); Rodríguez (penalty missed); Báez (penalty scored); Paiva (penalty missed)	3–4	(penalty scored) Quintero; (penalty scored) Holgado; (penalty scored) Soto; (penalty missed) Barrios; (penalty scored) Carrascal

Estadio Metropolitano Roberto Meléndez, Barranquilla
Attendance: 18,702
Referee: Wilton Sampaio (Brazil)

América de Cali advanced to the group stage (COL 1).

5 March 2025
19:30 UTC−5

Once Caldas (Colombia)	1–0	(Colombia) Millonarios
Barrios 80'	Report

Estadio Palogrande, Manizales
Attendance: 26,535
Referee: Andrés Matonte (Uruguay)

Once Caldas advanced to the group stage (COL 2).

5 March 2025
21:00 UTC−5

Mushuc Runa (Ecuador)	2–1	(Ecuador) Orense
Bentaberry 17'; Simisterra 56'	Report	Achilier 39'

Estadio Olímpico Fernando Guerrero, Riobamba (Note: Mushuc Runa played their home match at Estadio Olímpico de Riobamba, Riobamba instead of their regular stadium Estadio COAC Mushuc Runa, Ambato which did not meet CONMEBOL requirements.)
Attendance: 2,989
Referee: Gery Vargas (Bolivia)

Mushuc Runa advanced to the group stage (ECU 1).

6 March 2025
21:00 UTC−5

Universidad Católica (Ecuador)	0–0	(Ecuador) Aucas
	Report
Penalties
Cangá (penalty scored); I. Díaz (penalty scored); Martínez (penalty scored); Cacciabue (penalty scored)	4–2	(penalty scored) Montenegro; (penalty scored) Jaramillo; (penalty missed) Porozo; (penalty missed) Almagro

Estadio Olímpico Atahualpa, Quito
Attendance: 4,070
Referee: Kevin Ortega (Peru)

Universidad Católica advanced to the group stage (ECU 2).

4 March 2025 (Note: The Sportivo Luqueño v Sportivo Ameliano match, originally scheduled for 5 March 2025, was rescheduled to 4 March 2025.)
21:30 UTC−3

Sportivo Luqueño (Paraguay)	2–0	(Paraguay) Sportivo Ameliano
E. Vera 47'; Ayala 86'	Report

Estadio Arsenio Erico, Asunción (Note: Sportivo Luqueño played their home match at Estadio Arsenio Erico, Asunción (originally scheduled at Estadio Defensores del Chaco, Asunción) instead of their regular stadium Estadio Feliciano Cáceres, Luque which is closed for remodeling works.)
Attendance: 2,003
Referee: Cristian Garay (Chile)

Sportivo Luqueño advanced to the group stage (PAR 1).

6 March 2025
19:00 UTC−3

Guaraní (Paraguay)	2–0	(Paraguay) 2 de Mayo
Mendieta 38'; Torales 90+3'	Report

Estadio Arsenio Erico, Asunción (Note: Guaraní played their home match at Estadio Arsenio Erico, Asunción (originally scheduled at Estadio Defensores del Chaco, Asunción) instead of their regular stadium Estadio Rogelio Livieres, Asunción which is being rebuilt.)
Attendance: 1,389
Referee: Gustavo Tejera (Uruguay)

Guaraní advanced to the group stage (PAR 2).

4 March 2025
21:00 UTC−5

ADT (Peru)	1–1	(Peru) Cienciano
Cedrón 67'	Report	Choi 90+2' (o.g.)
Penalties
Choi (penalty scored); Bersano (penalty scored); Robles (penalty scored); Cabello (penalty scored); Fuentes (penalty missed); Pérez (penalty scored); Moyano (penalty missed)	5–6	(penalty missed) Garcés; (penalty scored) Cueva; (penalty scored) Valoyes; (penalty scored) Da Silva; (penalty scored) Estrada; (penalty scored) Neira; (penalty scored) Bolado

Estadio Huancayo, Huancayo (Note: ADT played their home match at Estadio Huancayo, Huancayo instead of their regular stadium Estadio Unión Tarma, Tarma which did not meet CONMEBOL requirements.)
Attendance: 3,055
Referee: Derlis López (Paraguay)

Cienciano advanced to the group stage (PER 1).

6 March 2025
19:30 UTC−5

Atlético Grau (Peru)	0–0	(Peru) Cusco
	Report
Penalties
Álvarez (penalty scored); Rostaing (penalty scored); Vásquez (penalty scored); Olivares (penalty scored)	4–2	(penalty missed) Colman; (penalty scored) Colitto; (penalty scored) Ruidías; (penalty missed) Ampuero

Estadio Mansiche, Trujillo (Note: Atlético Grau played their home match at Estadio Mansiche, Trujillo instead of their regular stadium Estadio Miguel Grau, Piura which has been abandoned for years.)
Attendance: 0 (Note: The Atlético Grau v Cusco match was played behind closed doors due to security concerns.)
Referee: Bryan Loayza (Ecuador)

Atlético Grau advanced to the group stage (PER 2).

5 March 2025
19:00 UTC−3

Racing (Uruguay)	0–0	(Uruguay) Montevideo Wanderers
	Report
Penalties
Sosa (penalty scored); Ferreira (penalty scored); Pereira (penalty scored); Severo (penalty scored)	4–2	(penalty scored) Veglio; (penalty scored) Lima; (penalty missed) T. Viudez; (penalty missed) Royón

Estadio Centenario, Montevideo (Note: Racing played their home match at Estadio Centenario, Montevideo instead of their regular stadium Estadio Osvaldo Roberto, Montevideo which did not meet CONMEBOL requirements.)
Referee: Roberto Pérez (Peru)

Racing advanced to the group stage (URU 1).

6 March 2025
19:00 UTC−3

Cerro Largo (Uruguay)	2–2	(Uruguay) Danubio
Affonso 20', 45+6'	Report	Cardozo 49'; S. Fernández 86' (pen.)
Penalties
Bertocchi (penalty scored); Otormín (penalty scored); Di Pippa (penalty scored); Contrera (penalty scored)	4–3	(penalty scored) S. Fernández; (penalty scored) Millán; (penalty scored) Romero; (penalty missed) Femia; (penalty missed) Peralta

Estadio Arquitecto Antonio Eleuterio Ubilla, Melo
Attendance: 1,452
Referee: Alexis Herrera (Venezuela)

Cerro Largo advanced to the group stage (URU 2).

5 March 2025 (Note: The Academia Puerto Cabello v Metropolitanos match, originally scheduled for 4 March 2025, was rescheduled to 5 March 2025.)
18:00 UTC−4

Academia Puerto Cabello (Venezuela)	3–0	(Venezuela) Metropolitanos
Manzambi 52'; Padrón 90+1'; Paredes 90+9'	Report

Estadio Misael Delgado, Valencia (Note: Academia Puerto Cabello played their home match at Estadio Misael Delgado, Valencia instead of their regular stadium Estadio La Bombonerita, Puerto Cabello which did not meet CONMEBOL requirements.)
Attendance: 5,111
Referee: Carlos Benítez (Paraguay)

Academia Puerto Cabello advanced to the group stage (VEN 1).

6 March 2025
20:30 UTC−4

Deportivo La Guaira (Venezuela)	0–2	(Venezuela) Caracas
	Report	Echenique 23', 56'

Estadio Olímpico de la UCV, Caracas
Referee: Carlos Betancur (Colombia)

Caracas advanced to the group stage (VEN 2).
