= 2024 Club Deportivo Palestino season =

Palestino
2024 season
- Manager: Pablo Sánchez (until 19 June); Lucas Bovaglio (from 30 June)
- Stadium: Estadio Municipal de La Cisterna
- Liga de Primera: 4th
- Copa Chile: Quarter-finals
- Copa Libertadores: Group stage
- Copa Sudamericana: Round of 16
- Top goalscorer: League: Bryan Carrasco (9); All: Bryan Carrasco (11)
- Average home league attendance: 2,119
- Biggest win: Palestino 5–0 Cobreloa
- Biggest defeat: Palestino 0–5 Universidad de Chile
Home colours	Away colours

The 2024 season was the 104th in the history of Club Deportivo Palestino and the club’s 34th consecutive season in the Chilean top flight. In addition to competing in the domestic league, the team also participated in the national cup and the Copa Liberatores.

== Competitions ==
=== Overall record ===
Competition	First match	Last match	Starting round	Final position	Record							
Competition	First match	Last match	Starting round	Final position	Pld	W	D	L	GF	GA	GD	Win %
Liga de Primera	24 February 2024	10 November 2024	Matchday 1	4th	30	13	7	10	46	33	+13	43.33
Copa Chile	16 June 2024	9 September 2024	Second round	Quarter-finals	7	4	1	2	15	11	+4	57.14
Copa Libertadores	20 February 2024	28 May 2024	Second stage	Group stage	10	5	1	4	13	16	−3	50.00
Copa Sudamericana	18 July 2024	21 August 2024	Knockout round play-offs	Round of 16	4	1	2	1	5	8	−3	25.00
Total					51	23	11	17	79	68	+11	45.10

Source: Competitions

=== Liga de Primera ===
==== League table ====
Pos	Team	Pld	W	D	L	GF	GA	GD	Pts	Qualification or relegation
2	Universidad de Chile	30	19	8	3	53	24	+29	65	Qualification for Copa Libertadores group stage
3	Deportes Iquique	30	14	6	10	53	48	+5	48	Qualification for Copa Libertadores second stage
4	Palestino	30	13	7	10	46	33	+13	46	Qualification for Copa Sudamericana first stage
5	Universidad Católica	30	13	7	10	44	34	+10	46	Qualification for Copa Sudamericana first stage
6	Unión Española	30	13	6	11	53	45	+8	45	Qualification for Copa Sudamericana first stage

Source: ANFP, Soccerway
Rules for classification: 1) Points, 2) Playoff game (only if needed to decide championship between two teams), 3) Goal difference, 4) Matches won, 5) Goals for, 6) Away goals for, 7) Red cards, 8) Yellow cards, 9) Drawing of lots.

==== Results summary ====
Overall								Home						Away					
Pld	W	D	L	GF	GA	GD	Pts	W	D	L	GF	GA	GD	W	D	L	GF	GA	GD
0	0	0	0	0	0	0	0	0	0	0	0	0	0	0	0	0	0	0	0

==== Results by round ====
Round	1	2	3	4	5	6	7	8	9	10	11	12	13	14	15	16	17	18	19	20	21	22	23	24	25	26	27	28	29	30
Ground	A	H	H	A	H	A	H	A	H	A	H	A	A	H	A	H	A	A	H	A	H	A	H	A	H	A	H	H	A	H
Result	D	W	L	W	D	W	W	W	D	L	W	D	L	L	W	L	L	D	W	L	W	D	D	L	W	L	W	L	W	W
Position	8	2	5	4	5	3	3	2	2	3	2	3	6	6	5	6	7	7	6	7	6	6	6	7	6	8	6	8	7	4

A = Away; H = Home; W = Win; D = Draw; L = Loss

==== Matches ====
The match schedule was released on 15 January 2024.

24 February 2024 2	Palestino	5–0	Cobreloa

2 March 2024 3	Palestino	0–2	Universidad Católica

9 March 2024 4	O'Higgins	0–1	Palestino

17 March 2024 5	Palestino	0–0	Unión La Calera

23 March 2024 1	Everton	0–0	Palestino

29 March 2024 6	Cobresal	0–2	Palestino

14 April 2024 8	Ñublense	0–2	Palestino

17 April 2024 7	Palestino	2–0	Huachipato

21 April 2024 9	Palestino	2–2	Universidad de Chile

29 April 2024 10	Deportes Iquique	2–1	Palestino

3 May 2024 11	Palestino	3–1	Deportes Copiapó

19 May 2024 13	Colo-Colo	2–0	Palestino

24 May 2024 14	Palestino	0–1	Unión Española

2 June 2024 15	Audax Italiano	1–2	Palestino

6 June 2024 12	Coquimbo Unido	0–0	Palestino

21 July 2024 16	Palestino	1–4	Everton

30 July 2024 17	Cobreloa	3–1	Palestino

3 August 2024 18	Universidad Católica	1–1	Palestino

9 August 2024 19	Palestino	4–1	O'Higgins

18 August 2024 20	Unión La Calera	2–1	Palestino

25 August 2024 21	Palestino	3–0	Cobresal

29 August 2024 22	Huachipato	2–2	Palestino

1 September 2024 23	Palestino	1–1	Ñublense

15 September 2024 24	Universidad de Chile	1–0	Palestino

24 September 2024 25	Palestino	2–0	Deportes Iquique

29 September 2024 26	Deportes Copiapó	2–1	Palestino

6 October 2024 27	Palestino	2–0	Coquimbo Unido

20 October 2024 28	Palestino	2–3	Colo-Colo

2 November 2024 29	Unión Española	2–3	Palestino

10 November 2024 30	Palestino	2–0	Audax Italiano

=== Copa Chile ===
==== Second round ====
16 June 2024	Santiago City	0–4	Palestino	San Joaquín
15:00 UTC−4		Report	Bizama 1'; Palacio 52'; Cornejo 57'; Carrasco 61'	Stadium: Municipal; Referee: Nicolás Gamboa

==== Third round ====
23 June 2024 First leg	Barnechea	3–2	Palestino	Santiago
12:00 UTC−4	Tapia 58', 72', 88'	Report	Carrasco 65'; Marabel 90+3'	Stadium: Estadio Municipal de Lo Barnechea; Referee: Nicolás Gamboa

30 June 2024 Second leg	Palestino	3–0 (5–3 agg.)	Barnechea	Santiago
15:00 UTC−4	Marabel 65'; Martínez 75'; Linares 82'	Report		Stadium: Estadio Municipal de La Cisterna; Referee: Nicolás Pozo

==== Round of 16 ====
6 July 2024 First leg	Santiago Wanderers	2–2	Palestino	Valparaíso
17:30 UTC−4	Muñoz 40'; Linares 80' (o.g.)	Report	Carrasco 58' (pen.); Linares 59'	Stadium: Elías Figueroa Brander; Referee: Nicolás Gamboa

12 July 2024 Second leg	Palestino	3–1 (5–3 agg.)	Santiago Wanderers	Santiago
15:00 UTC−4	Benítez 14'; Dávila 88'; Fuentes 90+2'	Report	Duma 46'	Stadium: Estadio Municipal de La Cisterna; Referee: Héctor Jona

==== Quarter-finals ====
5 September 2024 First leg	Palestino	0–5	Universidad de Chile	Santiago
15:00 UTC−4		Report	Guerra 17', 36'; Sepúlveda 48'; Fernández 62'; Palacios 83'	Stadium: Estadio Municipal de La Cisterna; Referee: Rodrigo Carvajal

9 September 2024 Second leg	Universidad de Chile	0–1 (5–1 agg.)	Palestino	Santiago
19:00 UTC−3		Report	Garro 73'	Stadium: Santa Laura-Universidad SEK; Referee: José Cabero

=== Copa Libertadores ===
==== Second round ====
20 February 2024 First leg	Portuguesa (Venezuela)	1–2	(Chile) Palestino	Caracas, Venezuela
18:00 UTC−4	Rodríguez 9'	Report	Carrasco 15' (pen.); Sosa 31'	Stadium: Brígido Iriarte Stadium; Attendance: 4,662; Referee: Augusto Aragón (Ecuador)

27 February 2024 Second leg	Palestino (Chile)	2–1 (4–2 agg.)	(Venezuela) Portuguesa	Rancagua
	Marabel 8'; Román 69'	Report	Meza 80'	Stadium: Estadio El Teniente; Attendance: 1,794; Referee: Mario Díaz de Vivar (Paraguay)

==== Third round ====
6 March 2024 First leg	Nacional (Paraguay)	0–2	(Chile) Palestino	Asunción, Paraguay
21:30 UTC−3		Report	Carrasco 47'; Sosa 50'	Stadium: Estadio Defensores del Chaco; Attendance: 1,289; Referee: Jesús Valenzuela (Venezuela)

13 March 2024 Second leg	Palestino (Chile)	1–3 (3–3 agg.) (3–1 p)	(Paraguay) Nacional	Rancagua
21:30 UTC−3	Abrigo (yellow card) 8'; Carrasco (yellow card) 11'; Suárez (yellow card) 55', (goal) 84'; Sosa (yellow card) 66'; Rojas (yellow card) 90+2'	Report	Alfaro (penalty missed) 10', 67'; Velazco (yellow card) 11'; Bailone (yellow card) 34'; Duarte 44'; Gaona 48'; Ojeda (yellow card) 87'	Stadium: Estadio El Teniente; Attendance: 1,434; Referee: Andrés Matonte (Uruguay)
	Penalties
	Sosa (penalty scored); Dávila (penalty scored); Chamorro (penalty scored)		Orzusa (penalty scored); Ojeda (penalty missed); Blasi (penalty missed); Santacruz (penalty missed)

==== Group stage ====
The group stage draw was conducted on 18 March 2024.

Group E

Pos	Team	Pld	W	D	L	GF	GA	GD	Pts	Qualification
1	(Bolivia) Bolívar	6	4	1	1	13	9	+4	13	Advance to round of 16
2	(Brazil) Flamengo	6	3	1	2	11	4	+7	10	Advance to round of 16
3	(Chile) Palestino	6	2	1	3	6	11	−5	7	Transfer to Copa Sudamericana
4	(Colombia) Millonarios	6	0	3	3	6	12	−6	3	

Source: CONMEBOL
Rules for classification: 1) Points; 2) Goal difference; 3) Goals scored; 4) Away goals scored; 5) CONMEBOL ranking.

4 April 2024 1	Palestino (Chile)	0–4	(Bolivia) Bolívar	Rancagua
21:00 UTC−3		Report	Da Costa 27' (pen.), 34'; Bruno Sávio 63'; R. Vaca 83'	Stadium: Estadio El Teniente; Attendance: 3,114; Referee: Yael Falcón Pérez (Argentina)

10 April 2024 2	Flamengo (Brazil)	2–0	(Chile) Palestino	Rio de Janeiro, Brazil
21:30 UTC−3	Pedro 21'; Léo Ortiz 85'	Report		Stadium: Maracanã; Attendance: 58,597; Referee: Facundo Tello (Argentina)

25 April 2024 3	Palestino (Chile)	3–1	(Colombia) Millonarios	Coquimbo
20:00 UTC−4	Chamorro 19', 42'; Véjar 75'	Report	L. Castro 32'	Stadium: Estadio Municipal Francisco Sánchez Rumoroso; Attendance: 1,918; Referee: Pablo Echavarría (Argentina)

7 May 2024 4	Palestino (Chile)	1–0	(Brazil) Flamengo	Coquimbo
20:00 UTC−4	Cornejo 63'	Report		Stadium: Estadio Municipal Francisco Sánchez Rumoroso; Attendance: 4,217; Referee: Esteban Ostojich (Uruguay)

14 May 2024 5	Millonarios (Colombia)	1–1	(Chile) Palestino	Bogotá, Colombia
21:00 UTC−5	Carvajal 40'	Report	Marabel 90+2'	Stadium: Estadio El Campín; Attendance: 12,109; Referee: Maximiliano Ramírez (Argentina)

28 May 2024 6	Bolívar (Bolivia)	3–1	(Chile) Palestino	La Paz, Bolivia
20:00 UTC−4	Bizama 35' (o.g.); Martínez 46' (o.g.); Da Costa 87'	Report	Chamorro 68'	Stadium: Estadio Hernando Siles; Attendance: 20,757; Referee: Andrés Merlos (Argentina)

=== Copa Sudamericana ===
==== Knockout round play-offs ====
18 July 2024 First leg	Palestino (Chile)	1–1	(Brazil) Cuiabá	Concepción
				Stadium: Estadio Ester Roa; Referee: Roberto Pérez (Peru)

25 July 2024 Second leg	Cuiabá (Brazil)	1–2 (2–3 agg.)	(Chile) Palestino	Cuiabá, Brazil
				Stadium: Arena Pantanal; Attendance: 6,004; Referee: Gery Vargas (Bolivia)

==== Round of 16 ====
14 August 2024 First leg	Palestino (Chile)	2–2	(Colombia) Independiente Medellín	Santiago
	Román 48'; Linares 50'		Varela 41', 90+3'	Stadium: Estadio Nacional Julio Martínez Prádanos; Attendance: 12,000; Referee: Augusto Aragón (Ecuador)

21 August 2024 Second leg	Independiente Medellín (Colombia)	4–0 (6–2 agg.)	(Chile) Palestino	Pereira, Colombia
	Román 29' (o.g.); Alvarado 42'; Chaverra 66' (pen.); Perlaza 67'			Stadium: Estadio Hernán Ramírez Villegas; Attendance: 9,384; Referee: Flavio Rodrigues de Souza (Brazil)
