= 2023 Club Deportivo Palestino season =

Palestino
2023 season
- Manager: Pablo Sánchez
- Stadium: Estadio Municipal de La Cisterna
- Liga de Primera: 5th
- Copa Chile: Round of 16
- Copa Sudamericana: Group stage
- Top goalscorer: League: Misael Dávila (10); All: Misael Dávila (14)
- Biggest win: Estudiantes de Mérida 1–5 Palestino; Palestino 4–0 Curicó Unido
- Biggest defeat: Palestino 1–5 Cobresal

The 2023 season was the 103rd in the history of Club Deportivo Palestino and the 34th consecutive season in the Chilean Primera División. On the domestic front, the team was eliminated in the quarter-finals of the Copa Chile, while internationally it took part in the Copa Sudamericana, placing third in its group and thus concluding its participation in the competition.

== Squad ==
=== Transfers In ===
Pos.	Player	Transferred from	Fee	Date	Source
FW	(Chile) Bruno Barticciotto	(Chile) Universidad Católica	Undisclosed	1 January 2023	
GK	(Chile) Gonzalo Collao	(Croatia) NK Istra	Free	1 January 2023	
GK	(Argentina) César Rigamonti	(Argentina) Central Córdoba	Free	1 January 2023	
DF	(Chile) Dilan Zúñiga	(Chile) Coquimbo Unido	Undisclosed	1 January 2023	
MF	(Chile) Fernando Cornejo	(Chile) Audax Italiano	Free	1 January 2023	
MF	(Chile) Joe Abrigo	(Chile) Coquimbo Unido	Free	20 June 2023	
FW	(Argentina) Hernán Rivero	(Uruguay) River Plate	Undisclosed	27 July 2023	

=== Transfers Out ===
Pos.	Player	Transferred to	Fee	Date	Source
GK	(Argentina) Daniel Sappa	(Argentina) Estudiantes	Loan return	31 December 2022	
FW	(Chile) Andrés Vilches	(Chile) Ñublense	Free	1 January 2023	
DF	(Chile) Sebastián Cabrera	(Chile) Coquimbo Unido	Free	1 January 2023	
GK	(Chile) Nery Veloso	(Chile) CDF Vial	Free	17 January 2023	
DF	(Chile) Vicente Fernández	(Argentina) Talleres	Undisclosed	3 February 2023	
MF	(Argentina) Mauro Diaz	(Ecuador) Universidad Católica	Free	7 February 2023	
DF	(Argentina) Franco Pardo	(Argentina) All Boys	Undisclosed	9 February 2023	
GK	(Chile) Gonzalo Collao		Contract terminated	25 July 2023	
FW	(Chile) Bruno Barticciotto	(Argentina) Talleres	€1,300,000	18 August 2023	

== Friendlies ==
7 January 2023	Palestino	3–0	Unión Española	Santiago
				Stadium: Estadio Municipal de La Cisterna

== Competitions ==
=== Overall record ===
Competition	First match	Last match	Starting round	Final position	Record							
Competition	First match	Last match	Starting round	Final position	Pld	W	D	L	GF	GA	GD	Win %
Primera División	21 January 2023	9 December 2023	Matchday 1	5th	30	14	7	9	46	40	+6	46.67
Copa Chile	9 April 2023	2 August 2023	Second round	Round of 16	3	2	0	1	8	6	+2	66.67
Copa Sudamericana	9 March 2023	27 June 2023	First stage	Group stage	7	3	2	2	8	7	+1	42.86
Total					40	19	9	12	62	53	+9	47.50

Source: Competitions

=== Liga de Primera ===
==== Results summary ====
Overall								Home						Away					
Pld	W	D	L	GF	GA	GD	Pts	W	D	L	GF	GA	GD	W	D	L	GF	GA	GD
30	14	7	9	46	40	+6	49	8	3	4	24	17	+7	6	4	5	22	23	−1

==== Results by round ====
Round	1	2	3	4	5	6	7	8	9	10	11	12	13	14	15	16	17	18	19	20	21	22	23	24	25	26	27	28	29	30
Ground	H	A	H	A	H	A	H	H	A	H	A	H	A	A	H	A	H	A	H	A	H	A	A	H	A	H	A	H	H	A
Result	D	D	W	W	D	L	W	W	L	L	L	L	D	W	L	W	D	W	W	W	W	D	L	W	L	W	D	L	W	W
Position	8	11	8	4	5	6	5	3	4	7	10	11	12	9	11	9	9	9	8	5	4	4	4	4	4	4	5	6	5	5

A = Away; H = Home; W = Win; D = Draw; L = Loss

==== Matches ====
21 January 2023 1	Palestino	1–1	Audax Italiano

28 January 2023 2	Coquimbo Unido	1–1	Palestino

5 February 2023 3	Palestino	2–0	Universidad de Chile

10 February 2023 4	Deportes Copiapó	1–3	Palestino

20 February 2023 5	Palestino	1–1	Unión La Calera

25 February 2023 6	Universidad Católica	5–2	Palestino

3 March 2023 7	Palestino	2–1	Huachipato

19 March 2023 9	Unión Española	2–0	Palestino

1 April 2023 8	Palestino	3–2	Magallanes
Note: The match was postponed due to Deportes Magallanes’ participation in the Copa Libertadores.

14 April 2023 10	Palestino	1–5	Cobresal

23 April 2023 11	Colo-Colo	3–1	Palestino

29 April 2023 12	Palestino	1–2	Ñublense

11 May 2023 13	Everton	2–2	Palestino

14 May 2023 14	Curicó Unido	0–1	Palestino

19 May 2023 15	Palestino	0–1	O'Higgins

7 July 2023 16	Audax Italiano	0–3	Palestino

17 July 2023 17	Palestino	1–1	Coquimbo Unido

22 July 2023 18	Universidad de Chile	0–1	Palestino

30 July 2023 19	Palestino	2–0	Deportes Copiapó

6 August 2023 20	Unión La Calera	2–3	Palestino

13 August 2023 21	Palestino	3–0	Universidad Católica

3 September 2023 23	Magallanes	2–0	Palestino

14 September 2023 22	Huachipato	2–2	Palestino

23 September 2023 24	Palestino	2–1	Unión Española

1 October 2023 25	Cobresal	2–1	Palestino

8 October 2023 26	Palestino	1–0	Colo-Colo

11 November 2023 27	Ñublense	1–1	Palestino

23 November 2023 28	Palestino	0–2	Everton

2 December 2023 29	Palestino	4–0	Curicó Unido

9 December 2023 30	O'Higgins	0–1	Palestino

=== Copa Chile ===
9 April 2023 Second round	Limache	1–3	Palestino	La Calera
15:00 UTC−4	Villarroel 24'; Brito (red card) 53'		Dávila 56', 88'; Salas 66'; Ceza (yellow card) 67'	Stadium: Estadio Municipal Nicolás Chahuán Nazar; Referee: Juan Lara

22 June 2023 Third round	Palestino	5–4	Santiago Morning	Santiago
15:00 UTC−4	Cornejo 23'; Dávila 36'; Salas 58', 63'; Barticciotto 84'		De Hoyos 27', 56' (pen.); Manríquez 32' (pen.), 88'	Stadium: Estadio Municipal de La Cisterna; Referee: Angelo Hermosilla

2 August 2023 Round of 16	Colo-Colo	1–0	Palestino	Macul
18:00 UTC−4	Rojas (red card) 35'; Pizarro 62'; Falcón (yellow card) 70'; Fuentes (yellow card) 90+1'		F. Meza (yellow card) 39'; Farías (yellow card) 49'; Salas (yellow card) 80'	Stadium: Estadio Monumental David Arellano; Referee: Juan Sepúlveda

=== Copa Sudamericana ===
==== First stage ====
9 March 2023	Cobresal (Chile)	0–1	(Chile) Palestino	Rancagua
18:00 UTC−3	Lezcano (yellow card) 25'; Céspedes (yellow card) 80'; Munder (yellow card) 90+5' (red card) 90+6'		Dávila 28', (yellow card) 83'; Farías (yellow card) 32'; Cornejo (yellow card) 49'; Salas (yellow card) 63'; N. Meza (yellow card) 83'	Stadium: Estadio El Teniente; Referee: Andrés Rojas (Colombia)

==== Group stage ====
Group H

5 April 2023 1	Fortaleza (Brazil)	4–0	(Chile) Palestino

18 April 2023 2	Palestino (Chile)	1–0	(Venezuela) Estudiantes de Mérida	Rancagua
20:00 UTC−4				Stadium: Estadio El Teniente; Attendance: 1,628; Referee: Michael Davis Espinoza

3 May 2023 3	Palestino (Chile)	0–0	(Argentina) San Lorenzo

25 May 2023 4	Estudiantes de Mérida (Venezuela)	1–5	(Venezuela) Palestino	Mérida, Venezuela
20:00 UTC−4	Penilla (yellow card) 21' (yellow-red card) 45+4'; Arenas 33', (yellow card) 65'; Gómez (yellow card) 81'		Carrasco 24' (pen.), 69'; Barticciotto 26', (yellow card) 51'; Farías 73'; Doldán 82' (o.g.)	Stadium: Estadio Metropolitano de Mérida; Referee: Augusto Aragón (Ecuador)

8 June 2023 5	San Lorenzo (Argentina)	0–0	(Venezuela) Palestino

27 June 2023 6	Palestino (Chile)	1–2	(Brazil) Fortaleza
