= 2026 Club Deportivo Palestino season =

Club Deportivo Palestino
2026 season
- Manager: Cristián Muñoz (until 25 April); Guillermo Farré (from 26 April)
- Stadium: Estadio Municipal de La Cisterna
- Liga de Primera: 11th
- Copa Chile: Group stage
- Copa de la Liga: Group stage
- Copa Sudamericana: Group stage
- Top goalscorer: League: Nelson Da Silva (5); All: Nelson Da Silva (7)
- Biggest win: Palestino 4–2 O'Higgins; Palestino 4–2 Cobresal
- Biggest defeat: Universidad Católica 6–1 Palestino

The 2026 season is the 106th in the history of Club Deportivo Palestino. During this season, the club is participating in the Primera División, Copa Chile, Copa de la Liga, and the Copa Sudamericana.

== Transfers ==
=== In ===
Pos.	Player	Transferred from	Fee	Date	Source
GK	(Chile) Sebastián Salas	(Chile) Barnechea		1 January 2026	
MF	(Uruguay) Sebastián Gallegos	(Chile) Deportes La Serena		1 January 2026	
MF	(Chile) César Munder	(Chile) Cobresal		2 January 2026	
FW	(Argentina) Nelson Da Silva	(Chile) Deportes Limache		6 January 2026	
DF	(Chile) Enzo Roco	(Turkey) Fatih Karagümrük		26 January 2026	

== Competitions ==
=== Overall record ===
Competition	First match	Last match	Starting round	Record							
Competition	First match	Last match	Starting round	Pld	W	D	L	GF	GA	GD	Win %
Liga de Primera	1 February 2026		Matchday 1	11	4	2	5	14	18	−4	36.36
Copa de la Liga	23 March 2026		Group stage	4	0	2	2	5	8	−3	0.00
Copa Sudamericana	4 March 2026		First stage	4	1	2	1	2	3	−1	25.00
Total				19	5	6	8	21	29	−8	26.32

Last updated: 2 May 2026
Source: Competitions

=== Liga de Primera ===
Pos	Team	Pld	W	D	L	GF	GA	GD	Pts
7	Everton	12	5	3	4	14	10	+4	18
8	Universidad de Chile	12	4	5	3	11	7	+4	17
9	Palestino	12	5	2	5	19	19	0	17
10	Ñublense	12	4	5	3	13	15	−2	17
11	Universidad de Concepción	12	5	2	5	10	19	−9	17

Updated to match(es) played on 17 May 2026. Source: Campeonato Chileno, Soccerway
Rules for classification: 1) Points, 2) Playoff game (only if needed to decide championship between two teams), 3) Goal difference, 4) Matches won, 5) Goals for, 6) Away goals for, 7) Red cards, 8) Yellow cards, 9) Drawing of lots.

==== Results by round ====
Round	1	2	3	4	5	6	7	8	9	10	11
Ground	H	A	H	A	H	H	A	A	H	A	H
Result	D	L	D	L	W	W	L	L	W	W	L
Position											

Updated to match(es) played on 24 April 2026. Source:
A = Away; H = Home; W = Win; D = Draw; L = Loss

==== Results summary ====
Overall								Home						Away					
Pld	W	D	L	GF	GA	GD	Pts	W	D	L	GF	GA	GD	W	D	L	GF	GA	GD
0	0	0	0	0	0	0	0	0	0	0	0	0	0	0	0	0	0	0	0

Last updated: 24 April 2026.

==== Matches ====
1 February 2026 1	Palestino	1–1	Ñublense

7 February 2026 2	Coquimbo Unido	3–1	Palestino

13 February 2026 3	Palestino	0–0	Universidad de Chile

21 February 2026 4	Huachipato	2–1	Palestino

28 February 2026 5	Palestino	4–2	O'Higgins

8 March 2026 6	Palestino	4–2	Cobresal

15 March 2026 7	Universidad de Concepción	1–0	Palestino

2 April 2026 8	Universidad Católica	6–1	Palestino
17:00

11 April 2026 9	Palestino	1–0	Deportes Limache
20:00

19 April 2026 10	Colo-Colo	0–1	Palestino
18:30

24 April 2026 11	Palestino	0–1	Deportes Concepción
20:00

=== Copa de la Liga ===
Group C

23 March 2026 1	Palestino	1–2	Everton

26 March 2026 2	Deportes Limache	1–1	Palestino

30 March 2026 3	Palestino	1–3	O'Higgins

2 May 2026 4	Everton	2–2	Palestino
15:00

=== Copa Sudamericana ===
==== First stage ====
4 March 2026	Universidad de Chile	1–2	(Chile) Palestino

==== Group stage ====
Pos	Team	Pld	W	D	L	GF	GA	GD	Pts	Qualification
1	(Uruguay) Montevideo City Torque (X)	5	4	0	1	9	3	+6	12	Advance to round of 16
2	(Brazil) Grêmio	4	2	1	1	4	1	+3	7	Advance to knockout round play-offs
3	(Argentina) Deportivo Riestra (E)	5	1	1	3	3	9	−6	4	
4	(Chile) Palestino (Y)	4	0	2	2	0	3	−3	2	

Updated to match(es) played on 19 May 2026. Source: CONMEBOL
Rules for classification: 1) Points; 2) Head-to-head points; 3) Head-to-head goal difference; 4) Head-to-head goals scored; 5) Goal difference; 6) Goals scored; 7) Red cards; 8) Yellow cards; 9) Drawing of lots.
(E) Eliminated; (X) Assured of at least a place in the Copa Sudamericana knockout round play-offs; (Y) May at best reach the Copa Sudamericana knockout round play-offs

8 April 2026 1	Deportivo Riestra (Argentina)	0–0	(Chile) Palestino	Argentina
19:00

14 April 2026 2	Palestino (Chile)	0–2	(Uruguay) Montevideo City Torque	Santiago
20:30	Garguez (yellow card) 60'; Fernandez (red card) 67'; Espinoza (yellow card) 90+2'		Rodríguez 12'; Romero (yellow card) 48'; Gallegos 64' (o.g.); Guzmán (yellow card) 87'	Stadium: Estadio Municipal de La Cisterna; Referee: Derlis Benítez (Paraguay)

29 April 2026 3	Palestino (Chile)	0–0	(Brazil) Grêmio	Santiago
20:30	Roco (yellow card) 16'; Gallegos (yellow card) 32'; Fernández (yellow card) 80'; Meza (red card) 88'		Pérez (yellow card) 5'; Dodi (yellow card) 29'; Carlos Vinícius (penalty missed) , 17 (yellow card) 90'	Stadium: Estadio Municipal de La Cisterna; Referee: Guillermo Guerrero (Ecuador)

6 May 2026 4	Montevideo City Torque (Uruguay)	v	(Chile) Palestino	Montevideo, Uruguay
19:00
