= Antonio Ciraolo =

Argentine football player and manager

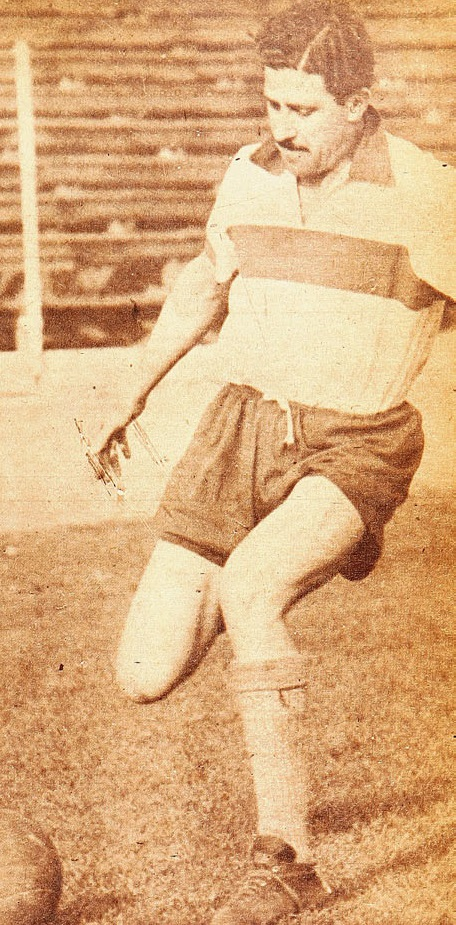

Personal information
- Full name: Antonio Ciraolo Martorana
- Date of birth: 7 January 1918
- Place of birth: Rosario, Argentina
- Position: Forward

Youth career
- Rosario Central

Senior career*
Years	Team	Apps	(Gls)
1936–1939	Rosario Central	3	(0)
1937	→ Quilmes (loan)	17	(5)
1939	Rampla Juniors		
1940	Independiente		
1941	Atlanta	8	(2)
1942	Quilmes	11	(3)
1943–1949	Universidad Católica		
1950–1953	Palestino		

Managerial career
- 1953: Palestino
- * Club domestic league appearances and goals

Antonio Ciraolo Martorana (7 January 1918 – unknown) was an Argentine naturalized Chilean football forward and manager.

== Career ==
Born in Rosario, Argentina, Ciraolo started his career with local club, Rosario Central, and made his official debut with them in the 2–1 home victory against Newell's Old Boys on 12 June 1938. Previously, he had been loaned out to Quilmes in the 1937 Argentine Primera División. The next years, he played for Uruguayan club Rampla Juniors (1939) and Independiente (1940), Atlanta (1941) and Quilmes (1942) in his homeland.

In 1943, Ciraolo moved to Chile and Universidad Católica and helped them to win their first Chilean Primera División title in 1949.

A historical player for Palestino, Ciraolo spent three seasons with them, winning the 1952 Segunda División, ended in January 1953.

== Post-retirement ==
Ciraolo served as the Palestino's head coach in the 1953 Primera División. The next years, he continued as a leader for them.

== Personal life ==
Ciraolo naturalized Chilean by residence in 1950.

Antonio was the grandfather of Chilean illustrator and painter Fab Ciraolo.
