= Mike Fuentes =

Mike Fuentes may refer to:

- Mike Fuentes (baseball), American baseball player
- Mike Fuentes (drummer), American drummer

== See also ==
- Michael Fuentes, Chilean footballer
