= Ariel Martínez =

Ariel Martínez may refer to:

- Ariel Martínez (Cuban footballer)
- Ariel Martínez (Chilean footballer)
- Ariel Martínez (baseball)
