= Miodrag Stefanović =

Miodrag Stefanović may refer to:

- Miodrag Stefanović (footballer, born 1977), Serbian footballer
- Miodrag Stefanović (footballer, born 1923) (1923–1991), Yugoslav footballer
- Miodrag Stefanović (basketball) (1922–1998), Serbian basketball player and coach
