= Caupolicán Peña =

Chilean football player and manager (1930–2026)

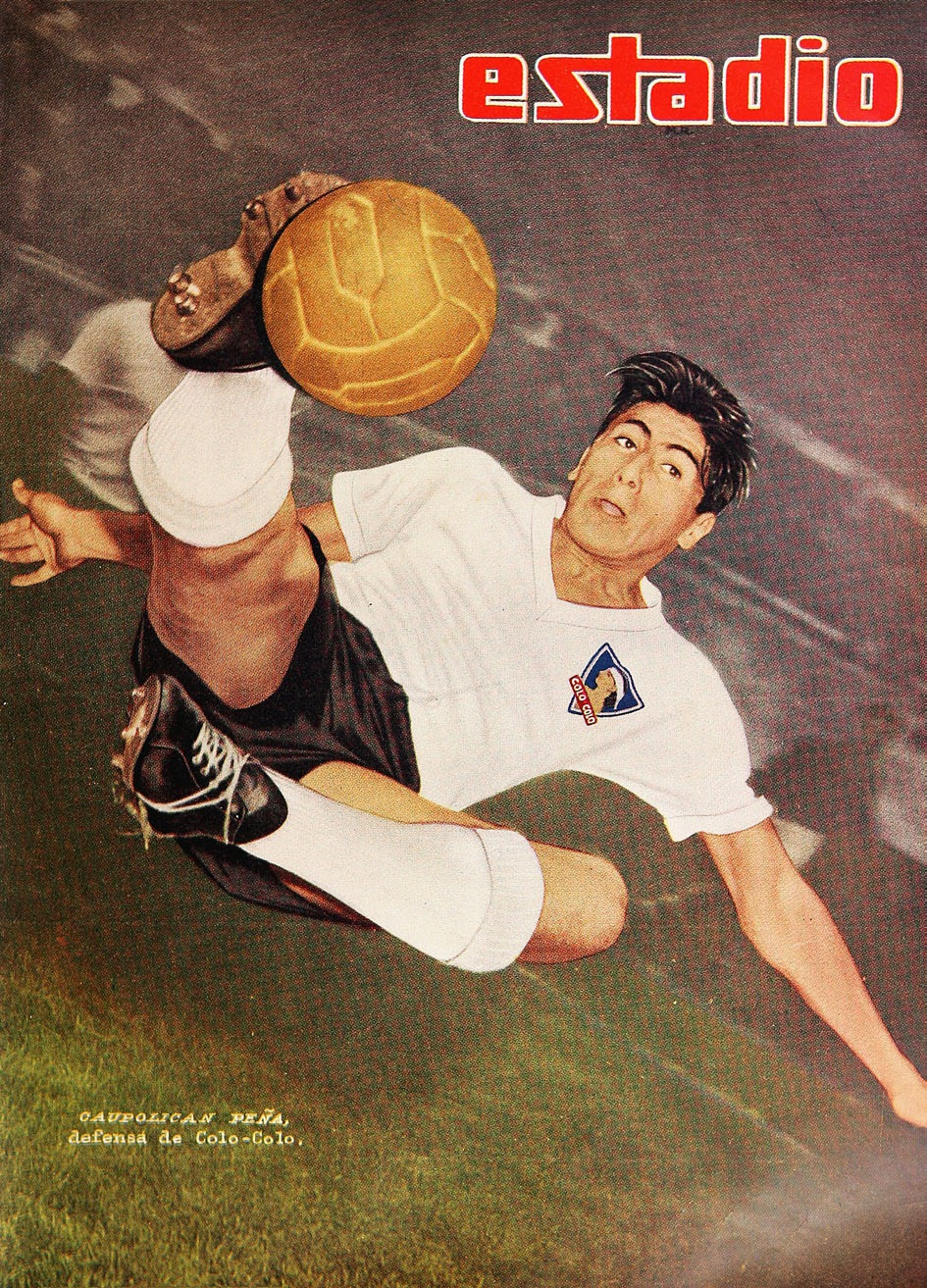
- Peña with Colo-Colo in 1953

Personal information
- Full name: Caupolicán Peña Reyes
- Date of birth: 15 September 1930
- Place of birth: Carahue, Chile
- Date of death: 1 October 2026 (aged 96)
- Height: 1.72 m (5 ft 8 in)
- Position: Midfielder

Senior career*
Years	Team	Apps	(Gls)
1951–1962	Colo-Colo	201	(6)

International career
1954–1958	Chile	15	(0)

Managerial career
- 1964: Colo-Colo
- 1965: Ñublense
- 1966–1970: Green Cross
- 1970: O'Higgins
- 1971: Huachipato
- 1972–1973: Deportes La Serena
- 1974–1980: Palestino
- 1977: Chile
- 1981–1982: Everton
- 1982: Unión Española
- 1984: Audax Italiano
- * Club domestic league appearances and goals

Caupolicán Peña Reyes (15 September 1930 – 1 October 2026) was a Chilean football player and manager. He is considered one of the greatest players in Colo-Colo history. Peña died on 1 October 2026, at the age of 96.

== Legacy ==
On 10 February 1960, Peña assumed as the President of the Unión de Jugadores Profesionales (Union of Professional Football Players) in Chile.

== In politics ==
Peña was a candidate for deputy of the 8th department group (Melipilla, San Bernardo, San Antonio and Maipo) in the 1965 Chilean parliamentary election as a member of the National Democratic Party (PADENA). In 2004, he was elected councillor for La Florida commune as a member of Party for Democracy.

== Honours ==
=== Player ===
Colo-Colo

- Primera División de Chile: 1953, 1956, 1958
- Copa Chile: 1960

=== Manager ===
Palestino

- Primera División de Chile: 1978
- Copa Chile: 1977
