= Marcelo Eggel =

Argentine footballer

Personal information
- Full name: Marcelo Mario Eggel
- Date of birth: 17 January 1999 (age 27)
- Place of birth: San Vicente, Santa Fe, Argentina
- Height: 1.79 m (5 ft 10 in)
- Position: Attacking midfielder

Team information
- Current team: Palestino (on loan from Deportivo Maipú)

Youth career
- Bochófilo Bochazo
- 2013–2020: Newell's Old Boys

Senior career*
Years	Team	Apps	(Gls)
2020	Newell's Old Boys	0	(0)
2020–2021	Juventud Unida Universitario	33	(3)
2022–	Deportivo Maipú	111	(15)
2024	→ Orense (loan)	26	(0)
2026–	→ Palestino (loan)	0	(0)
- * Club domestic league appearances and goals as of 8 July 2026

Marcelo Mario Eggel (born 17 January 1999) is an Argentine footballer who plays as an attacking midfielder for Chilean club Palestino on loan from Deportivo Maipú.

== Club career ==
Born in San Vicente, Santa Fe, Argentina, Eggel was with Club Bochófilo Bochazo before joining the Newell's Old Boys youth ranks, aged 13. In November 2020, he switched to Juventud Unida Universitario in the Torneo Federal A.

In 2022, Eggel signed with Deportivo Maipú in the Primera Nacional. In January 2024, he was loaned out to Ecuadorian club Orense for a year. Back to Deportivo Maipú, he was sent on loan to Chilean Primera División club Palestino in July 2026 with a purchase option.

== International career ==
Eggel took part in training sessions of Argentina national under-20 team and served as a sparring for the Argentina senior team.
