= Jan Lucumí =

Colombian footballer

Personal information
- Full name: Jan Franc Lucumí González
- Date of birth: 11 February 2004 (age 22)
- Place of birth: Cali, Colombia
- Height: 1.78 m (5 ft 10 in)
- Position: Winger

Team information
- Current team: América de Cali
- Number: 17

Youth career
- 2008–2013: Atlético Dorados
- 2013–2020: Boca Juniors de Cali

Senior career*
| Years | Team | Apps | (Gls) |
| 2021– | Boca Juniors de Cali | 76 | (8) |
| 2024 | → Fluminense (loan) | 5 | (0) |
| 2025– | → América de Cali (loan) | 41 | (2) |

International career
| 2022 | Colombia U20 | 2 | (0) |
- * Club domestic league appearances and goals as of 11 December 2025

Jan Franc Lucumí González (born 11 February 2004) is a Colombian footballer who plays as right winger for América de Cali, on loan from Boca Juniors de Cali.

== Club career ==
Born in Cali, Lucumí began his career with local side Club Atlético Dorados at the age of four. He moved to the youth categories of Boca Juniors de Cali in 2013, aged nine, and was promoted to the first team for the 2021 season.

Lucumí made his first team debut on 11 February 2021, coming on as a second-half substitute in a 1–0 Categoría Primera B home loss to Unión Magdalena. A backup option in his first year, he became a starter in his second, scoring his first senior goal on 18 July 2022, in a 2–1 home win over Orsomarso.

Lucumí became an undisputed starter for Boca during the 2023 campaign, scoring six goals. On 2 February 2024, he moved to Campeonato Brasileiro Série A side Fluminense on a one-year loan deal.

=== Fluminense ===
Lucumí joined the roster that won the Copa Libertadores the previous year, so, there was fierce competition at the right wing. The starter at the position was the also Colombian Jhon Arias.

He ended up playing only five games for the senior squad, spending the majority of his contract duration at the U20 and U23 squads, where he scored two goals but didn't impress the coaching staff. Lucumí returned to Colombia at the end of the loan period.

=== América de Cali ===
Returning to Colombia, Lucumí was loaned once again, this time to América de Cali until December 2025. On 7 March 2025, he scored his first goal for the club in the 2–2 draw against Junior, for the Copa Sudamericana first round.

== International career ==
In September 2022, Lucumí played two friendlies for the Colombia national under-20 team.

== Personal life ==
Lucumí's older brother Jhon is also a footballer. A centre-back, he plays for Bologna.

== Career statistics ==
As of 26 January 2024

| Club | Season | League | | | Cup | | Continental | | Other | | Total | |
| Club | Season | Division | Apps | Goals | Apps | Goals | Apps | Goals | Apps | Goals | Apps | Goals |
|---|---|---|---|---|---|---|---|---|---|---|---|---|
| Boca Juniors de Cali | 2021 | Categoría Primera B | 15 | 0 | 4 | 0 | — | | — | | 19 | 0 |
| Boca Juniors de Cali | 2022 | Categoría Primera B | 28 | 2 | 2 | 0 | — | | — | | 30 | 2 |
| Boca Juniors de Cali | 2023 | Categoría Primera B | 33 | 6 | 0 | 0 | — | | — | | 33 | 6 |
| Boca Juniors de Cali | Total | | 76 | 8 | 6 | 0 | — | | — | | 82 | 8 |
| Fluminense (loan) | 2024 | Série A | 0 | 0 | 0 | 0 | 0 | 0 | 0 | 0 | 0 | 0 |
| Career total | | | 76 | 8 | 6 | 0 | 0 | 0 | 0 | 0 | 82 | 8 |
