= Felipe Chamorro =

Chilean footballer

Personal information
- Full name: Felipe Sebastián Chamorro Aspe
- Date of birth: 30 July 2001 (age 25)
- Place of birth: Las Condes, Santiago, Chile
- Height: 1.84 m (6 ft 0 in)
- Position: Midfielder

Team information
- Current team: Deportes La Serena

Youth career
- Palestino

Senior career*
Years	Team	Apps	(Gls)
2020–2024	Palestino	69	(5)
2025–	Deportes La Serena	0	(0)
- * Club domestic league appearances and goals as of 17 December 2024

Felipe Sebastián Chamorro Aspe (born 30 July 2001) is a Chilean professional footballer who plays as a midfielder. He last played for Chilean Primera División side Deportes La Serena.

== Club career ==
A left-footed midfielder, Chamorro is a product of Palestino youth system and made his professional debut in a Chilean Primera División match against Everton in September 2020. He signed his first professional contract on 15 March 2021 and scored his first goal against Unión La Calera on 30 July 2022.

Chamorro switched to Deportes La Serena for the 2025 season.

== International career ==
Since 2022, Chamorro has frequently taken part in training microcycles of the Chile national team at under-23 level. He was included in the final squad for the 2024 Pre-Olympic Tournament, but he was withdrawn due to a medical condition.

At senior level, he received his first call up for the 2026 FIFA World Cup qualifiers against Uruguay and Colombia in September 2023.

== Style of play ==
Chamorro is known for his versatility and mainly operates as a midfielder.
