= José Doldán =

Paraguayan footballer (born 1997)

Personal information
- Full name: José Alexis Doldán Aquino
- Date of birth: 27 February 1997 (age 29)
- Place of birth: Asunción, Paraguay
- Height: 1.78 m (5 ft 10 in)
- Position: Centre-back

Team information
- Current team: Estudiantes de Mérida
- Number: 4

Senior career*
Years	Team	Apps	(Gls)
2018	Fulgencio Yegros	18	(1)
2019	Alebrijes	2	(0)
2020	Necaxa	5	(1)
2020–2022	Querétaro	30	(1)
2022	→ Atlético Tucumán (loan)	5	(0)
2024–	Estudiantes de Mérida	30	(1)
- * Club domestic league appearances and goals as of 22 September 2024

José Alexis Doldán Aquino (born 27 February 1997) is a Paraguayan footballer who plays as a centre-back for Venezuelan club Estudiantes de Mérida.
