= Misael Dávila =

Chilean footballer (born 1991)

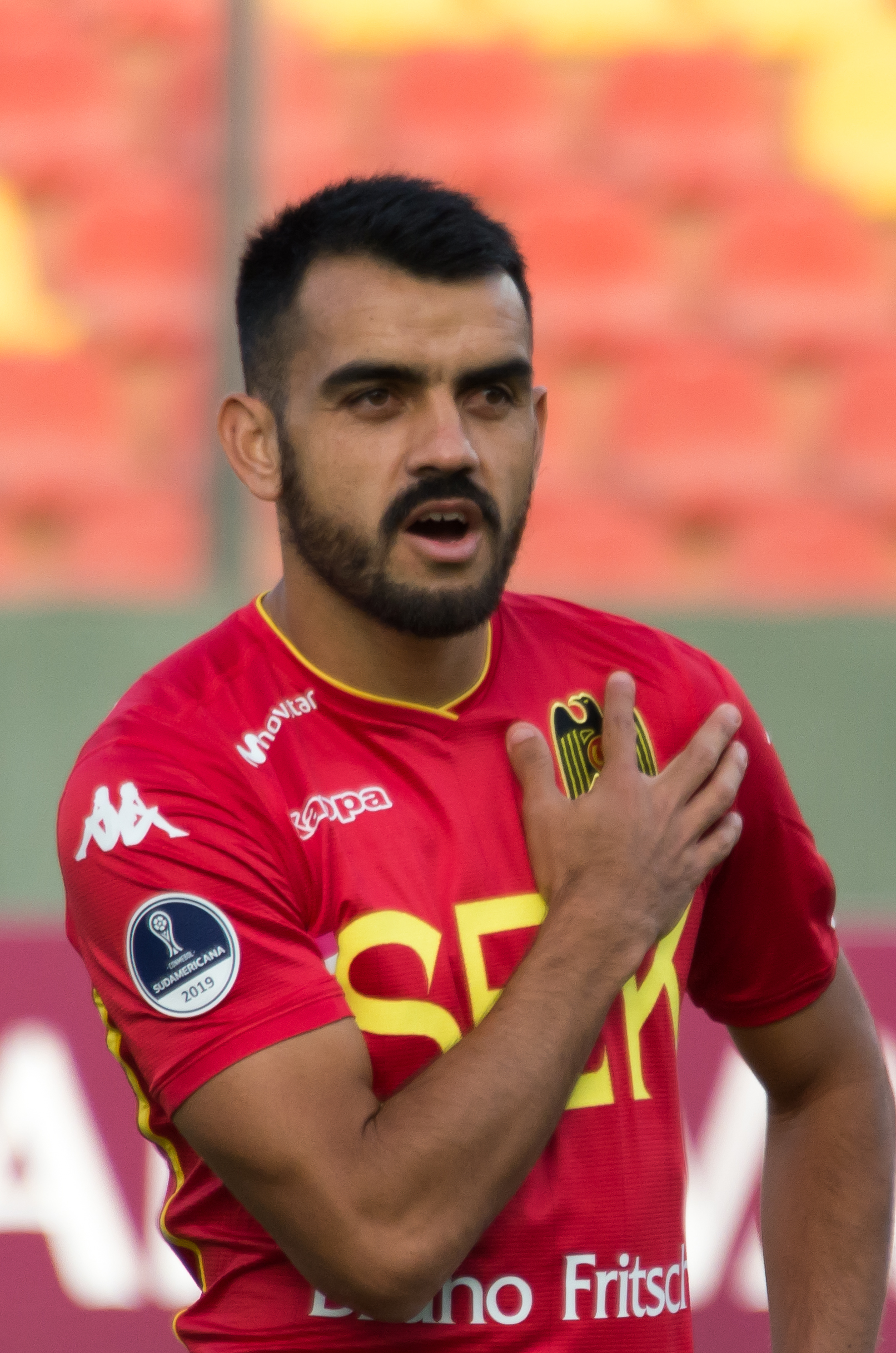
- Dávila with Unión Española in 2019

Personal information
- Full name: Misael Aldair Dávila Carvajal
- Date of birth: 17 July 1991 (age 35)
- Place of birth: Iquique, Chile
- Height: 1.72 m (5 ft 8 in)
- Position: Midfielder

Team information
- Current team: Deportes Concepción
- Number: 22

Youth career
- 2003–2007: Deportes Iquique

Senior career*
Years	Team	Apps	(Gls)
2008–2017	Deportes Iquique	188	(15)
2014	→ Deportes Temuco (loan)	17	(3)
2018–2020	Unión Española	83	(21)
2021–2024	Palestino	99	(20)
2025	Deportes Iquique	28	(4)
2026–	Deportes Concepción	0	(0)

International career
2009	Chile U17	4	(0)
- * Club domestic league appearances and goals as of 26 December 2025

Misael Aldair Dávila Carvajal (born 17 July 1991) is a Chilean footballer that currently plays for Chilean Primera División club Deportes Concepción as a midfielder.

== Career ==
In December 2025, Dávila joined Deportes Concepción from Deportes Iquique.

== Honours ==
Deportes Iquique

- Copa Chile: 2010
- Primera B: 2010
