= Evelio Cardozo =

Argentine professional footballer

Personal information
- Full name: Evelio Ramón Cardozo
- Date of birth: 6 February 2001 (age 25)
- Place of birth: Buenos Aires, Argentina
- Height: 1.67 m (5 ft 6 in)
- Position: Winger

Team information
- Current team: Nueva Chicago (on loan from Racing Club)

Youth career
- 2010–2016: Argentinos Juniors
- 2016–2019: Racing Club

Senior career*
| Years | Team | Apps | (Gls) |
| 2019– | Racing Club | 2 | (0) |
| 2021–2022 | → Atlanta (loan) | 32 | (0) |
| 2023 | → Sportivo Trinidense (loan) | 1 | (0) |
| 2023–2024 | → Nueva Chicago (loan) | 36 | (2) |
| 2025 | → Danubio (loan) | 12 | (1) |
| 2026– | → Nueva Chicago (loan) | 5 | (0) |

International career
- Argentina U18
| 2018 | Argentina U20 | | |
- * Club domestic league appearances and goals as of 17:20, 13 April 2026 (UTC)

Evelio Ramón Cardozo (born 6 February 2001) is an Argentine professional footballer who plays as a winger for Nueva Chicago on loan from Racing Club.

== Club career ==
Cardozo joined Argentinos Juniors at the age of nine, before departing in January 2016 to Racing Club for a reported fee of $3,000,000. He made the substitutes' bench five times in 2019, including for two Copa Libertadores matches. He did likewise for two Copa de la Liga Profesional games in 2020–21, though would eventually make his debut in that competition on 19 November 2020 against Atlético Tucumán; replacing Fabricio Domínguez for the final moments of a two-goal defeat away from home.

In July 2021, Cardozo was loaned out to Primera Nacional club Atlanta until the end of 2022.

== International career ==
Cardozo represented Argentina's U20s at the Ipiranga Cup in 2018. He also trained with the U17s and U18s, notably featuring for the latter in a friendly against Temperley in September 2019.

Atlanta

== Career statistics ==
As of 21 November 2020.

Appearances and goals by club, season and competition
| Club | Season | League | | | Cup | | League Cup | | Continental | | Other | | Total | |
| Club | Season | Division | Apps | Goals | Apps | Goals | Apps | Goals | Apps | Goals | Apps | Goals | Apps | Goals |
|---|---|---|---|---|---|---|---|---|---|---|---|---|---|---|
| Racing Club | 2018–19 | Primera División | 0 | 0 | 0 | 0 | 0 | 0 | 0 | 0 | 0 | 0 | 0 | 0 |
| Racing Club | 2019–20 | Primera División | 0 | 0 | 0 | 0 | 0 | 0 | 0 | 0 | 0 | 0 | 0 | 0 |
| Racing Club | 2020–21 (Note: Soccerway counts Copa de la Liga Profesional appearances as league appearances.) | Primera División | 1 | 0 | 0 | 0 | 0 | 0 | 0 | 0 | 0 | 0 | 1 | 0 |
| Career total | | | 1 | 0 | 0 | 0 | 0 | 0 | 0 | 0 | 0 | 0 | 1 | 0 |
