= Gu-Rum Choi =

Peruvian footballer (born 1998)

Personal information
- Full name: Gu-Rum Choi Guevara
- Date of birth: 22 August 1998 (age 28)
- Place of birth: Callao, Peru
- Height: 1.91 m (6 ft 3 in)
- Position: Defender

Team information
- Current team: ADT
- Number: 16

Senior career*
Years	Team	Apps	(Gls)
2015	Circolo		
2016–2017	Ayacucho		
2018	Alfredo Salinas	15	(0)
2019–2025	ADT	90	(2)
2026–	Cusco	2	(0)
- * Club domestic league appearances and goals as of 30 December 2025

Gu-Rum Choi Guevara (Spanish: [ˈɡuɾum ˈtʃoi]; Korean: 최구름; born 22 August 1998) is a Peruvian professional footballer who plays as a defender and Captain for Peruvian Primera División club Cusco FC.

== Career ==
Choi started his career with Peruvian side Circolo. In 2016, he signed for Peruvian side Ayacucho. In 2018, he signed for Peruvian side Alfredo Salinas. In 2019, he signed for Peruvian side ADT. He helped the club win the 2021 Copa Perú.

== Style of play ==
Choi mainly operates as a defender. He is known for his versatility.

== Personal life ==
Choi was born in 1998 in Callao, Peru. He is of Korean descent.

== Honours ==
Asociación Deportiva Tarma

- Copa Perú: 2021
