= Juan Cruz Bolado =

Argentine footballer

Personal information
- Full name: Juan Cruz Bolado Morici
- Date of birth: 22 July 1997 (age 29)
- Place of birth: Mendoza, Argentina
- Height: 1.82 m (6 ft 0 in)
- Position: Goalkeeper

Team information
- Current team: Santiago Morning
- Number: 1

Youth career
- Godoy Cruz

Senior career*
Years	Team	Apps	(Gls)
2017–2021	Godoy Cruz	6	(0)
2021–2022	Deportivo Maipú	33	(0)
2023	Independiente Rivadavia	3	(0)
2023–2024	Libertad FC	17	(0)
2025–	Cienciano	19	(0)
2025–	Santiago Morning	0	(0)
- * Club domestic league appearances and goals as of 30 December 2025

Juan Cruz Bolado Morici (born 22 July 1997) is an Argentine professional footballer who plays as a goalkeeper for Chilean club Santiago Morning.

== Club career ==
Cruz Bolado made his professional debut with Godoy Cruz in a 2-1 Argentine Primera División loss to Independiente on 9 November 2019.

In February 2021, Bolado joined Primera Nacional side Deportivo Maipú.

In March 2026, Bolado moved to Chile and joined Santiago Morning in the Segunda División Profesional de Chile.
