= Gonzalo Tapia (footballer, born 1996) =

Chilean footballer

Personal information
- Full name: Gonzalo Alejandro Tapia Pérez
- Date of birth: 24 February 1996 (age 30)
- Place of birth: La Pintana, Santiago, Chile
- Height: 1.72 m (5 ft 8 in)
- Position: Forward

Team information
- Current team: Palestino
- Number: 20

Youth career
- Juventud Jaime Silva
- Palestino
- 2015: Universidad de Chile

Senior career*
Years	Team	Apps	(Gls)
2015	Deportes La Pintana	7	(0)
2015–2016	Universidad de Chile	0	(0)
2016	Gasparín	–	(–)
2016–2017	Independiente Cauquenes	10	(0)
2017	Real San Joaquín	28	(25)
2018	San Marcos	5	(0)
2018	Real San Joaquín	–	(–)
2019	Rodelindo Román	35	(29)
2020	Lautaro de Buin	–	(–)
2020–2022	Deportes Recoleta	74	(35)
2023	Santiago Morning	26	(5)
2024	Barnechea	27	(21)
2025–	Palestino	17	(2)
- * Club domestic league appearances and goals as of 24 August 2025

Gonzalo Alejandro Tapia Pérez (born 24 February 1996) is a Chilean footballer who plays as a forward for Chilean Primera División side Palestino.

== Club career ==
Born in La Pintana commune, Santiago de Chile, Tapia was with Juventud Jaime Silva and Palestino as a youth player. In 2015, he had a stint with Deportes La Pintana in the Segunda División Profesional before joining the Universidad de Chile under-19 team. He was with the first team under Martín Lasarte and Sebastián Beccacece, but he moved to Gasparín after having no chances to play.

The next seasons, Tapia played for clubs at lower divisions of the Chilean football such as Independiente de Cauquenes, Real San Joaquín, San Marcos de Arica, Rodelindo Román, with whom he won the 2019 Tercera B, and Lautaro de Buin. As a player of Real San Joaquín, he was awarded as the best amateur player by the Círculo de Periodistas Deportivos de Chile (CPD) (Sports Journalists Circle of Chile) after becoming the top goalscorer of the 2017 Tercera A with 25 goals.

In 2020, Tapia joined Deportes Recoleta, winning the 2021 Segunda División Profesional and getting the promotion to the Primera B for the 2022 season.

After Deportes Recoleta, Tapia played for Santiago Morning and Barnechea in 2023 and 2024, respectively.

On 8 December 2024, Tapia signed with Palestino in the Chilean Primera División and took part in the Copa Sudamericana.

== Personal life ==
His grandfather is the founder of Juventud Jaime Silva, his first club at the age of 10.

His brother has played football for clubs such as Iberia and Provincial Temuco. His sister, Aracelly, is also a footballer who has played for clubs such as Cobresal and Magallanes.
