= Franco Romero =

Franco Romero may refer to:

- Franco Romero (footballer, born 1995), Uruguayan right-back
- Franco Romero (footballer, born 2000), Argentine central midfielder
