= Miodrag Stefanović (footballer, born 1923) =

Yugoslav footballer and manager

Personal information
- Full name: Miodrag Stefanović Nikolić
- Date of birth: 21 October 1923
- Place of birth: Kragujevac, Kingdom of SCS
- Date of death: 1 November 1991 (aged 68)
- Place of death: Santiago, Chile
- Position: Forward

Youth career
- BASK

Senior career*
Years	Team	Apps	(Gls)
1937–1941	BASK		
1943–1944	Straßburg		
1945–1950	San Ferdinando		

Managerial career
- San Ferdinando
- Padova
- Capua
- 1954–1957: Palestino
- 1959: San Luis
- * Club domestic league appearances and goals

Miodrag Stefanović Nikolić (21 October 1923 – 1 November 1991) was a Yugoslav football player and manager.

== Club career ==
As a youth player, Stefanović played as a goalkeeper. He turned into a forward and started his career with BASK at the age of 14 until 1940. In the context of the Nazi occupation of Serbia, he moved to France in 1943 and spent two years with Straßburg. He ended his career with Italian club San Ferdinando, aged 27.

== Managerial career ==
Following his retirement, Stefanović coached the Italian clubs San Ferdinando, Padova and Capua.

Stefanović came to Chile in November 1954 and was appointed the manager of Palestino in the Primera División, winning the 1955 league title.

After Palestino, Stefanović ended his career with San Luis de Quillota in 1959.

=== Confusion about his name ===
In Chile, the manager of Palestino between 1955 and 1957 is frequently and wrongly named "Milan Stefanovic" or "Boris Stefanovic". In fact, Milan Stefanović Aleksić was also a Yugoslav who fought in the World War II, came to Chile in 1950 and served as a translator for Miodrag and the Palestino players. Both Milan and Miodrag worked at Textil Yarur, a clothing factory owned by Amador Yarur, then the President of Palestino.

== Personal life ==
Stefanović died from lung cancer on 1 November 1991.
