= 1953 Campeonato Nacional Primera División =

Campeonato Nacional de Fútbol Profesional
- Dates: 2 May 1953 – 7 December 1953
- Champions: Colo-Colo (6th title)
- Matches: 182
- Goals: 697 (3.83 per match)
- Top goalscorer: Jorge Robledo (26 goals)
- Biggest home win: Colo-Colo 6–0 Audax Italiano (28 June)
- Highest attendance: 50,664 Universidad de Chile 0–4 Universidad Católica (25 November)
- Total attendance: 1,637,948
- Average attendance: 8,999

The 1953 Campeonato Nacional de Fútbol Profesional was first tier's 21st season which Colo-Colo reached its sixth professional title.

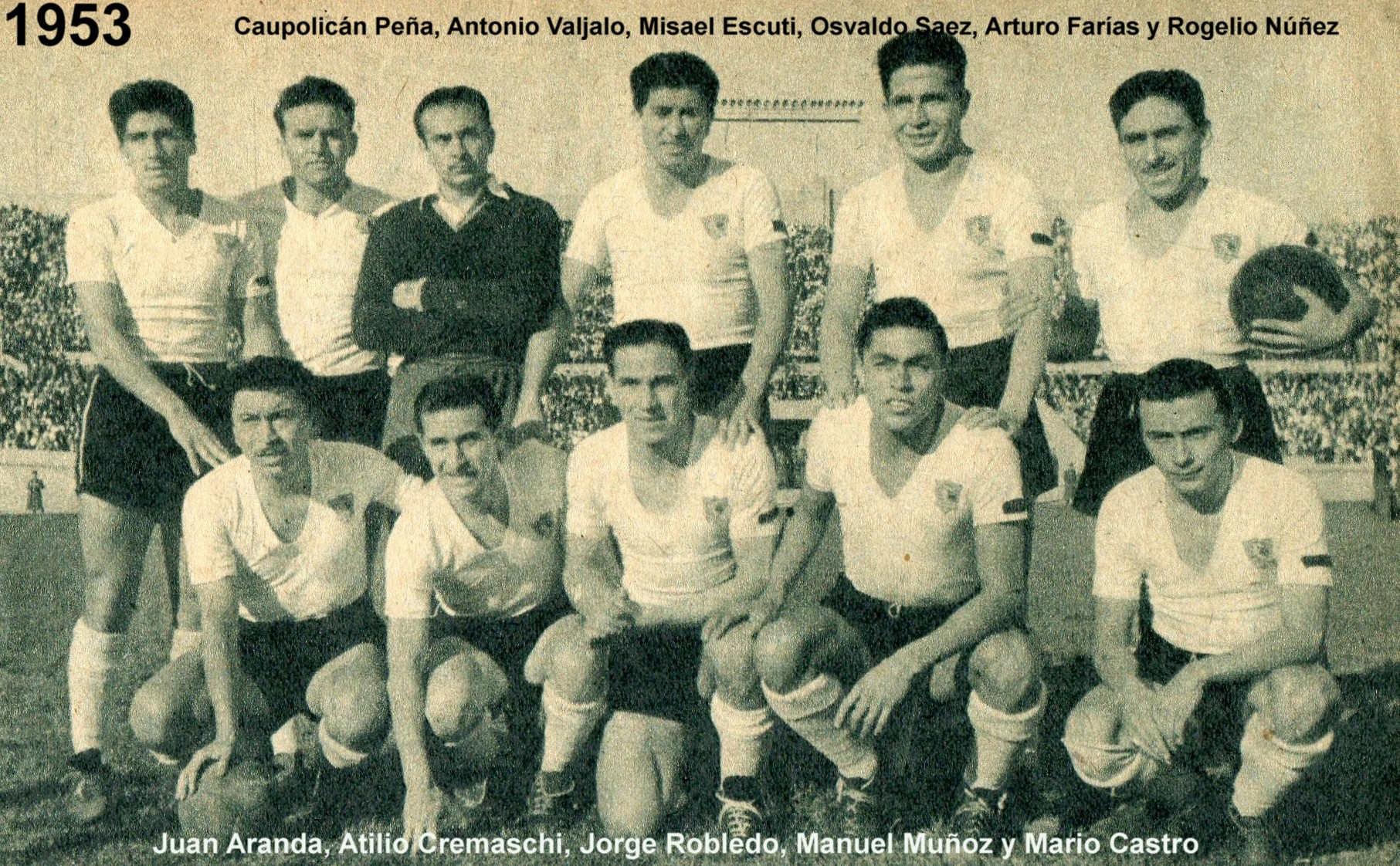
Colo-Colo’s 1953 champion team.

== Scores ==
	AUD	COL	EVE	FEB	GCR	IBE	MAG	PAL	RAN	SMO	UES	UCA	UCH	SWA
Audax		1–2	1–4	2–0	4–2	3–0	2–1	3–2	3–0	2–2	0–0	2–1	4–0	1–0
Colo-Colo	6–0		3–1	3–3	1–1	0–2	3–3	3–0	3–2	4–1	3–0	5–2	4–0	2–0
Everton	2–0	1–2		2–3	3–0	1–1	1–0	1–2	3–2	3–0	1–2	0–1	2–2	2–2
Ferrobádminton	1–3	0–4	2–3		4–2	2–5	5–1	3–4	2–0	3–1	1–3	3–4	2–4	3–1
Green Cross	2–1	1–1	0–1	2–2		2–2	1–1	0–2	1–0	4–2	2–1	2–2	1–2	4–4
Iberia	0–2	1–6	1–2	1–2	2–3		2–3	0–0	1–1	1–4	1–1	1–4	1–4	0–0
Magallanes	0–1	3–8	3–1	0–2	0–2	4–2		2–3	1–2	1–4	1–2	1–3	1–2	4–2
Palestino	1–2	1–2	0–1	3–3	3–2	3–1	4–2		2–2	6–1	0–1	3–3	1–1	2–2
Rangers	1–1	1–2	4–3	4–0	2–5	2–0	2–0	3–5		2–4	2–3	4–3	3–0	1–0
S. Morning	2–2	2–1	1–2	1–1	0–2	2–1	5–5	4–5	3–5		0–2	4–2	3–2	1–0
U. Española	0–3	1–3	0–4	1–2	1–5	3–3	1–1	0–3	1–1	1–2		1–2	1–3	2–4
U. Católica	2–2	0–0	4–0	1–1	1–2	2–0	0–2	2–2	1–1	2–2	1–3		0–1	0–1
U. de Chile	2–1	1–6	1–1	0–2	1–0	3–1	2–2	0–1	4–2	2–1	3–1	0–4		1–2
S. Wanderers	3–1	4–3	0–2	1–3	6–1	2–1	4–1	3–5	1–1	6–2	3–2	0–2	1–2	

== Standings ==
Pos	Team	Pld	W	D	L	GF	GA	GD	Pts	Qualification
1	Colo-Colo	26	18	5	3	80	32	+48	41	Champions
2	Palestino	26	13	7	6	63	47	+16	33	
3	Audax Italiano	26	14	5	7	47	36	+11	33	
4	Everton	26	13	4	9	47	37	+10	30	
5	Universidad de Chile	26	13	4	9	43	48	−5	30	
6	Green Cross	26	11	5	10	49	49	0	27	
7	Ferrobádminton	26	11	5	10	55	56	−1	27	
8	Universidad Católica	26	9	8	9	49	43	+6	26	
9	Santiago Wanderers	26	10	5	11	52	49	+3	25	
10	Rangers	26	9	6	11	50	52	−2	24	
11	Santiago Morning	26	9	5	12	54	67	−13	23	
12	Unión Española	26	7	5	14	34	54	−20	19	
13	Magallanes	26	5	5	16	43	66	−23	15	
14	Iberia	26	2	7	17	31	61	−30	11	

Campeonato Profesional
1953 champions
Colo-Colo
6th title

== Topscorer ==
Name	Team	Goals
(Chile) Jorge Robledo	Colo-Colo	26
