= Jason León =

Chilean footballer

Personal information
- Full name: Jason Matías León Alvear
- Date of birth: 11 May 2000 (age 26)
- Place of birth: Quilpué, Chile
- Height: 1.74 m (5 ft 9 in)
- Position: Left-back

Team information
- Current team: Palestino
- Number: 23

Youth career
- El Sauce
- 2011–2020: Santiago Wanderers

Senior career*
Years	Team	Apps	(Gls)
2020–2024	Santiago Wanderers	68	(1)
2025–	Palestino	21	(0)

International career
2015	Chile U15		
- * Club domestic league appearances and goals as of 21 September 2025

Jason Matías León Alvear (born 11 May 2000) is a Chilean footballer who plays as a left-back for Chilean Primera División side Palestino.

== Club career ==
Born in Quilpué, Chile, León was with club El Sauce from El Belloto town before joining the Santiago Wanderers youth ranks. He made his senior debut in the 2–3 away win against Colo-Colo for the Chilean Primera División on 29 August 2020 and signed his first professional contract on 2 September of the same year. He left them after fourteen years at the end of the 2024 season.

In December 2024, León signed with Palestino for the 2025 Chilean Primera División and took part in the 2025 Copa Sudamericana.

== International career ==
León represented Chile at under-15 level, winning the 2015 Aspire Tri-Series International Tournament in Doha, Qatar.
