= Gasparín FC =

Chilean football club

Gasparín F.C.
- Nicknames: Gasolero (Gasworker); SoccerGas (Soccergas); ThunderCats (ThunderCats)
- Founded: July 27, 2012 as Nueva Juventud San Ramón; December 3, 2013 as Gasparín F.C.
- Dissolved: 2023
- Ground: Municipal de Lo Blanco; El Bosque, Santiago, Chile
- Capacity: 1 000 onlooker
- Chairman: Jonathan Cereceda
- Coach: Manuel Rodríguez
- League: Tercera División B
- Website: http://www.gasparin.cl
Home colours	Away colours	Third colours

Club Deportivo, Social y Cultural Gasparín, also known as «Gasparín F.C.», is a Chilean football club based in the city of El Bosque. They currently play at the fourth level of Chilean football, the Third Division A of Chile.

== History ==
The club was founded on July 27, 2012 in Santiago of Chile as Nueva Juventud de San Ramón in the San Ramón commune.

In the year 2014, the chairman decided to change the club's name to Club Deportivo, Social y Cultural Gasparín like his LPG company, "Gasparín".

At that very year, the Gasparín FC got the promotion following a 2-1 win against Pudahuel Barrancas.

== Stadium ==
The stadium of Club Deportivo, Social y Cultural Gasparín, is the Stadium Municipal of Lo Blanco.

- Direction: Street Lo Blanco 550, El Bosque, Santiago, Chile.
- Capacity: 1 000.

== Coach ==
- (Venezuela) Tulio Pinilla Peña (2019)
- (Chile) Manuel Rodríguez Garrido (2019)

== Seasons ==
- 3 seasons in Third Division A of Chile.
- 3 seasons in Third Division B of Chile.
- 2 participation in Absolute Cup of Chile.

== Statistics ==
- Biggest win in favor
  - Gasparín FC 6 - 0 Deportes Pirque, in the year 2016.
- Biggest win against
  - Provincial Marga Marga 10 - 0 Gasparín FC, in the year 2012.

== Performance ==
=== League ===
Season	Division	Nivel	Position	
2013–A	Tercera División B	V	7.°	
2013–C	Tercera División B	V	7.°	
2014	Tercera División B	V	3.°	3.° P
2015	Tercera División A	IV	8.°	
2016	Tercera División A	IV	12.°	
2017	Tercera División A	IV	14.°	
2018	Tercera División B	V	3.°	4.° P
2019	Tercera División B	V	7.°	1.° R
2021	Tercera División B	V	1.°	R16 P
2022	Tercera División B	V	8.°	
2023-	Break			

↑ Promoted ↓ Relegated

=== Cup ===
Season	Competition	Position
2015	Copa Absoluta	Group Stage
2016	Copa Absoluta	R16

✪ Champion
