= Joaquín Moya (footballer) =

Chilean footballer

Personal information
- Full name: Joaquín Ignacio Moya Fuentes
- Date of birth: 13 December 1993 (age 32)
- Place of birth: Santiago, Chile
- Height: 1.70 m (5 ft 7 in)
- Position: Midfielder

Team information
- Current team: Everton
- Number: 7

Youth career
- Barnechea

Senior career*
Years	Team	Apps	(Gls)
2014–2018	Barnechea	76	(5)
2019–2021	Deportes Melipilla	77	(1)
2022–2024	Deportes Iquique	68	(5)
2025–	Everton	17	(1)
- * Club domestic league appearances and goals as of 4 September 2025

Joaquín Ignacio Moya Fuentes (born 13 December 1993) is a Chilean footballer who plays as a midfielder for Everton de Viña del Mar in the Chilean Primera División.

== Club career ==
Born in Santiago de Chile, Moya is a product of Barnechea and made his professional debut in the 2013–14 Primera B de Chile. Later, he won the 2016–17 Segunda División Profesional de Chile and continued with them until the 2018 season.

In 2019, Moya joined Deportes Melipilla, getting the promotion to the Chilean Primera División for the 2021 season. In January 2022, he switched to Deportes Iquique, getting again the promotion to the 2024 Chilean Primera División.

In the 2025 season, Moya continued in the Chilean top division with Everton de Viña del Mar and took part in the 2025 Copa Sudamericana.

== Personal life ==
His son has been in the Colo-Colo youth ranks.
