= 1952 Campeonato Nacional Segunda División =

Segunda División
- Season: 1952
- Champions: Palestino
- Promoted: Palestino; Rangers
- Top goalscorer: Héctor Aviles (Rangers; 18 goals)

The 1952 Segunda División de Chile was the first season of the Segunda División de Chile.

Palestino was the tournament's winner.

== Table ==
Pos	Team	Pld	W	D	L	GF	GA	GD	Pts
1	Rangers (C, P)	21	11	6	4	38	26	+12	28
2	Palestino (P)	21	11	6	4	41	31	+10	28
3	Thomas Bata	21	10	4	7	35	27	+8	24
4	América	21	7	7	7	35	31	+4	21
5	Santiago National	21	9	3	9	41	41	0	21
6	Maestranza Central	21	5	8	8	29	26	+3	18
7	Trasandino	21	5	6	10	35	44	−9	16
8	Instituto O'Higgins	21	4	4	13	27	55	−28	12

Source: rsssf.com
(C) Champions; (P) Promoted

== See also ==
- Chilean football league system
