= Michael Vadulli =

Chilean footballer (born 1998)

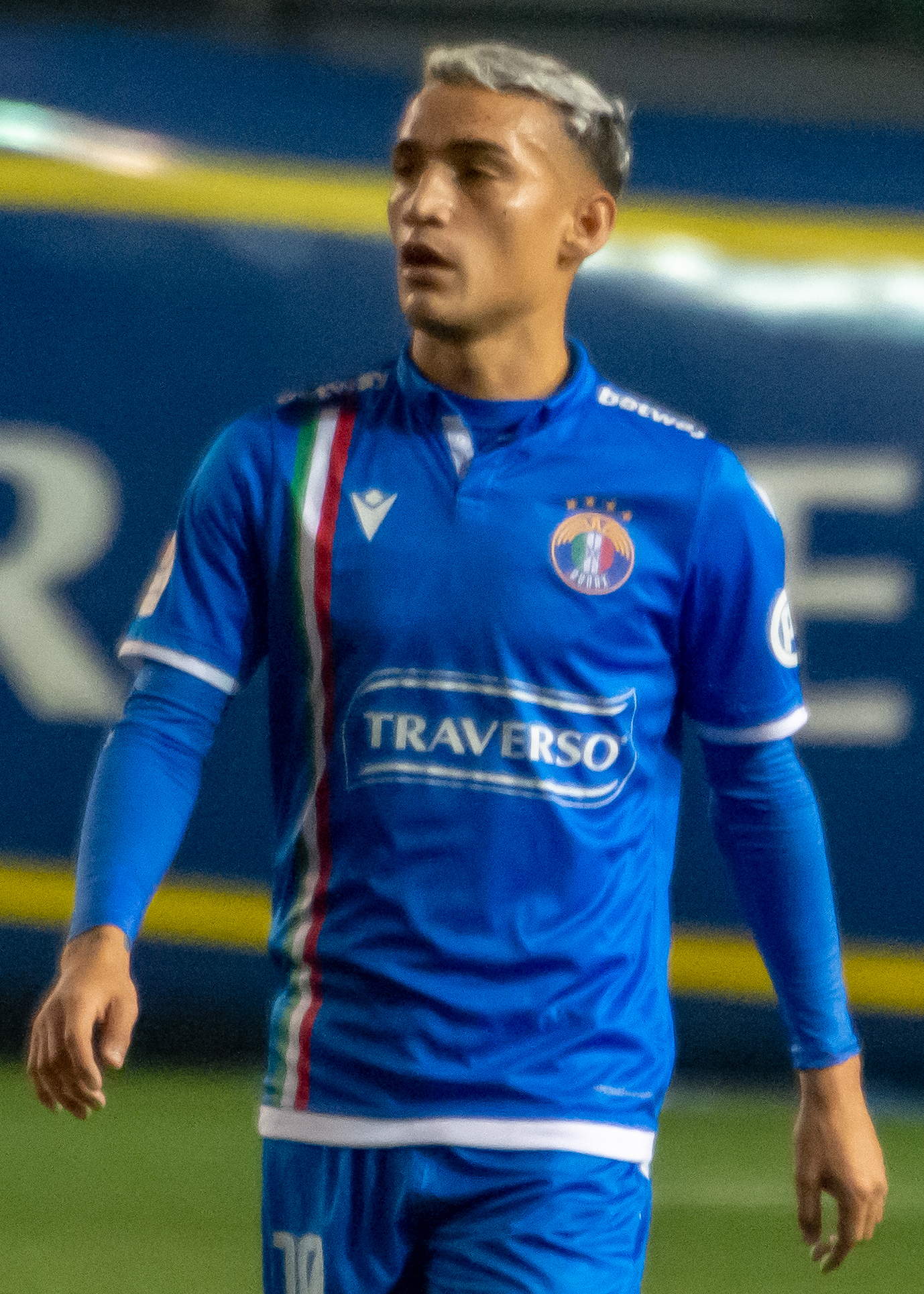
- Vadulli with Audax Italiano in 2023

Personal information
- Full name: Michael Andrés Vadulli Fuentes
- Date of birth: 27 May 1998 (age 28)
- Place of birth: Iquique, Chile
- Height: 1.77 m (5 ft 10 in)
- Position: Forward

Team information
- Current team: Audax Italiano
- Number: 27

Youth career
- Colegio Deportivo

Senior career*
Years	Team	Apps	(Gls)
2018–2021	Deportes Iquique	39	(3)
2021	→ Audax Italiano (loan)	27	(4)
2022–	Audax Italiano	50	(7)
2024	→ Palestino (loan)	10	(0)

International career^{‡}
2017	Chile (beach soccer)		
2022–	Chile	1	(0)
- * Club domestic league appearances and goals as of 22 December 2024 ‡ National team caps and goals as of 17 December 2022

Michael Andrés Vadulli Fuentes (born Michael Andrés Fuentes Vadulli; 27 May 1998) is a Chilean professional footballer who plays as a forward for Chilean Primera División side Audax Italiano.

== Club career ==
In 2018, Fuentes joined Deportes Iquique from Colegio Deportivo CODE Iquique after being observed by the coach Jaime Vera and made his professional debut in a Chilean Primera División match against Palestino on April 21, 2018. After Deportes Iquique was relegated to Primera B, on 2021 season he was loaned to Audax Italiano on a deal for a year.

In 2024, he was loaned to Palestino from Audax Italiano.

== International career ==
Previous to his signing with Deportes Iquique, Fuentes represented the Chile national beach soccer team. On 16 November 2022, he made his international debut with the Chile national team in a friendly against Poland.

== Personal life ==
He is of Greek descent through his grandfather who had settled in Chile long time ago and acquired that nationality.

Born Michael Andrés Fuentes Vadulli, he officially reversed his surnames in honor of his maternal grandparents, with whom he raised.
