= Antonio Ceza =

Chilean footballer

Personal information
- Full name: Antonio Alejandro Ceza Gavilán
- Date of birth: 23 November 2002 (age 23)
- Place of birth: Santiago, Chile
- Height: 1.82 m (6 ft 0 in)
- Position: Centre-back

Team information
- Current team: Palestino
- Number: 4

Youth career
- Universidad de Chile
- Palestino

Senior career*
Years	Team	Apps	(Gls)
2022–	Palestino	43	(3)
2022	→ San Antonio Unido (loan)	7	(0)
- * Club domestic league appearances and goals as of 21 September 2025

Antonio Alejandro Ceza Gavilán (born 23 November 2002) is a Chilean footballer who plays as a centre-back for Chilean Primera División side Palestino.

== Club career ==
As a youth player, Ceza played as a midfielder for the Universidad de Chile under-14 team before joining Palestino as a centre-back. He was loaned out to San Antonio Unido in the second half of 2022. Back to Palestino, he signed his first professional contract on 18 January 2023 and made his debut with them in the 1–3 away win against Deportes Copiapó for the Chilean Primera División on 11 February of the same year. In the same season, he scored his first goal in the 2–2 against Huachipato on 15 September 2023.

A regular player during 2023 and 2024, also taking part in both the Copa Sudamericana and the Copa Libertadores, Ceza renewed with Palestino in November 2024 until the 2026 season.

== International career ==
In August 2023, Ceza was called up to a training microcycle of the Chile under-23 national team under Eduardo Berizzo.
