= Ian Garguez =

Chilean footballer

Personal information
- Full name: Ian Alex Garguez Gómez
- Date of birth: 3 February 2005 (age 21)
- Place of birth: Colina, Chile
- Height: 1.81 m (5 ft 11 in)
- Position: Defender

Team information
- Current team: Palestino
- Number: 29

Youth career
- Unión Española
- 2020–2024: Palestino

Senior career*
Years	Team	Apps	(Gls)
2024–	Palestino	42	(4)

International career^{‡}
2025	Chile U20	10	(1)
2025–	Chile	4	(0)
- * Club domestic league appearances and goals as of 9 June 2026 ‡ National team caps and goals as of 30 March 2026

Ian Alex Garguez Gómez (born 3 February 2005) is a Chilean footballer who plays as a defender for Chilean Primera División side Palestino and the Chile national team.

== Club career ==
As a youth player, Garguez was with Unión Española before joining the Palestino youth ranks. He made his senior debut in the 1–2 away win against Audax Italiano for the Chilean Primera División on 1 June 2024 and signed his first professional contract on 13 September of the same year.

== International career ==
Garguez has represented Chile at under-20 level in friendlies and the 2025 South American Championship, where he suffered an appendicitis after the group stage.

At senior level, Garguez received his first call up for the 2026 FIFA World Cup qualifiers against Brazil and Uruguay in September 2025.

== Style of play ==
A defender, Garguez can operate as a full-back, mainly on the right side of the field, or a centre-back.

== Career statistics ==
=== International ===
As of match played 30 March 2026

Appearances and goals by national team and year
National team	Year	Apps	Goals
Chile	2025	2	0
Chile	2026	2	0
Total		4	0
