= Junior Marabel =

Paraguayan footballer

Personal information
- Full name: Junior Osvaldo Marabel Jara
- Date of birth: 26 March 1998 (age 28)
- Place of birth: Capiatá, Paraguay
- Height: 1.86 m (6 ft 1 in)
- Position: Striker

Team information
- Current team: Sarmiento (on loan from Unión Santa Fe)
- Number: 27

Youth career
- Deportivo Capiatá

Senior career*
Years	Team	Apps	(Gls)
2016–2022	Deportivo Capiatá	33	(7)
2018	→ Cerro Porteño (loan)	3	(0)
2020–2021	→ 12 de Octubre (loan)	27	(2)
2021	→ Guaireña (loan)	14	(2)
2022	→ General Caballero JLM (loan)	19	(8)
2022–	Unión Santa Fe	31	(2)
2023	→ General Caballero JLM (loan)	9	(5)
2024–2025	→ Palestino (loan)	51	(12)
2026–	→ Sarmiento (loan)	32	(14)
- * Club domestic league appearances and goals as of 17:57, 2 June 2026 (UTC)

Junior Osvaldo Marabel Jara (born 26 March 1998) is a Paraguayan footballer who plays as a striker for Argentine club Sarmiento, on loan from Unión Santa Fe.

== Club career ==
Born in Capiatá, Paraguay, Marabel began his career with his hometown club, Deportivo Capiatá. He played on loan for Cerro Porteño, 12 de Octubre, Guaireña and General Caballero JLM.

In the second half of 2022, Marabel was transferred to Argentine Primera División side Unión de Santa Fe. In 2023, he returned to Paraguay to play on loan for General Caballero JLM. In 2024, he was loaned out to Chilean Primera División club Palestino on a one-year deal.
