= Joe Abrigo =

Chilean footballer (born 1995)

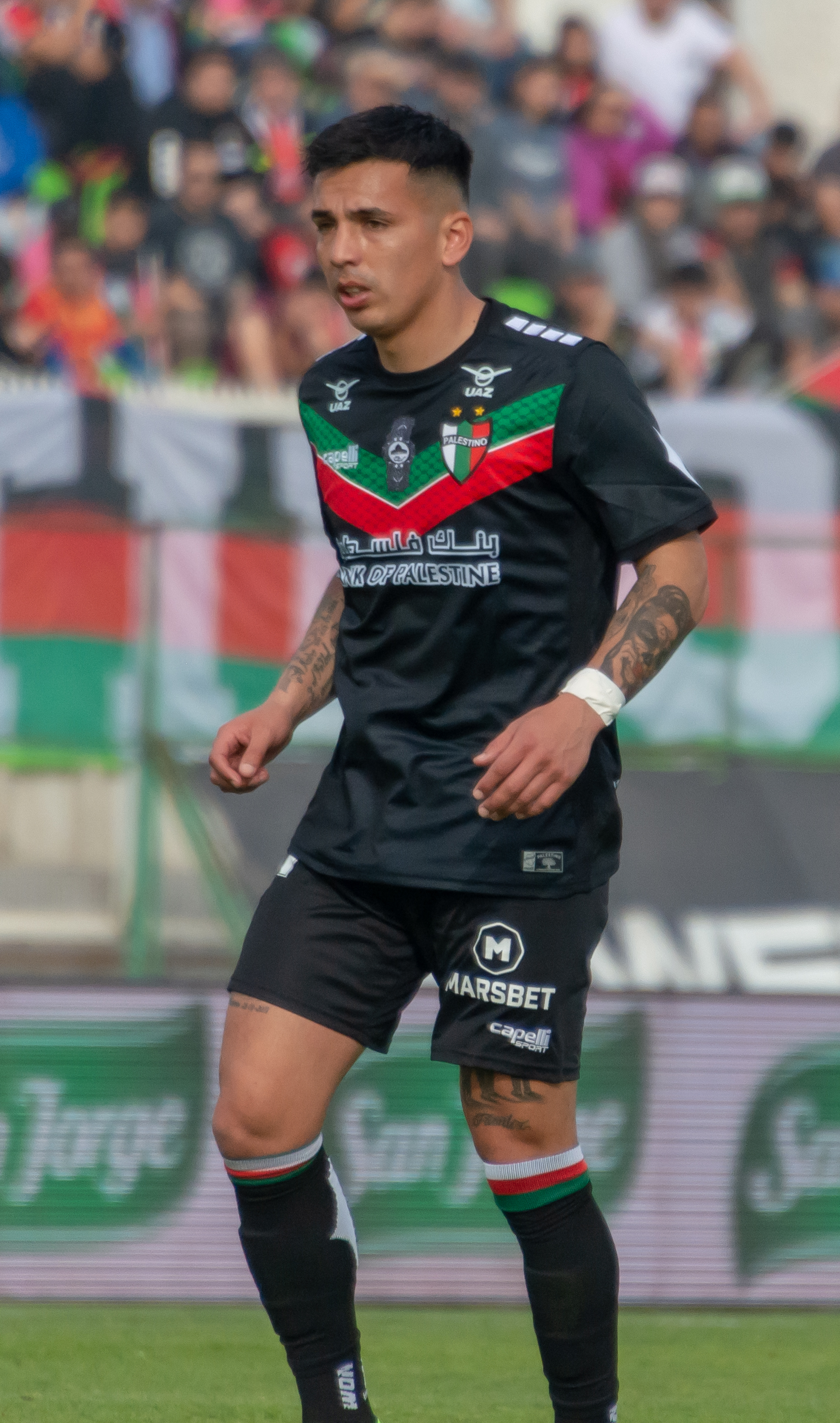
- Abrigo with Palestino in 2023

Personal information
- Full name: Joe Axel Abrigo Navarro
- Date of birth: 22 March 1995 (age 31)
- Place of birth: Santiago, Chile
- Height: 1.70 m (5 ft 7 in)
- Position: Attacking midfielder

Team information
- Current team: Palestino
- Number: 14

Youth career
- 2003–2010: Unión Española
- 2010–2012: Magallanes

Senior career*
| Years | Team | Apps | (Gls) |
| 2012–2016 | Magallanes | 55 | (4) |
| 2016–2017 | Coquimbo Unido | 23 | (4) |
| 2017–2019 | Audax Italiano | 36 | (3) |
| 2018–2019 | → Veracruz (loan) | 16 | (1) |
| 2019 | Audax Italiano | 4 | (0) |
| 2020 | Coquimbo Unido | 31 | (6) |
| 2021 | → Unión Española (loan) | 6 | (0) |
| 2021 | → Ñublense (loan) | 13 | (2) |
| 2022-2023 | Coquimbo Unido | 29 | (14) |
| 2023– | Palestino | 73 | (18) |
- * Club domestic league appearances and goals as of 13 May 2023

Joe Axel Abrigo Navarro (born 22 March 1995) is a Chilean professional footballer who plays as a midfielder for Palestino.

== Career ==
In June 2023, he signed with Palestino from Coquimbo Unido.

== Personal life ==
He is the cousin of Jason Flores, another professional football player.

== Career statistics ==
As of match played 13 May 2026

Appearances and goals by club, season and competition
| Club | Season | League | | | National cup | | Continental | | Other | | Total | |
| Club | Season | Division | Apps | Goals | Apps | Goals | Apps | Goals | Apps | Goals | Apps | Goals |
|---|---|---|---|---|---|---|---|---|---|---|---|---|
| Magallanes | 2013 | Primera B | — | | 4 | 2 | — | | — | | 4 | 2 |
| Magallanes | 2014–15 | Primera B | 26 | 2 | 1 | 0 | — | | — | | 27 | 2 |
| Magallanes | 2015–16 | Primera B | 11 | 1 | 2 | 0 | — | | — | | 13 | 1 |
| Magallanes | Total | | 37 | 3 | 7 | 2 | 0 | 0 | 0 | 0 | 40 | 3 |
| Coquimbo Unido | 2015–16 | Primera B | 9 | 4 | 1 | 0 | — | | — | | 10 | 4 |
| Coquimbo Unido | 2016–17 | Primera B | 14 | 0 | — | | — | | — | | 14 | 0 |
| Coquimbo Unido | Total | | 23 | 4 | 1 | 0 | 0 | 0 | 0 | 0 | 24 | 4 |
| Audax Italiano | 2016–17 | Liga de Primera | 14 | 0 | 2 | 0 | — | | — | | 16 | 0 |
| Audax Italiano | 2017–18 | Liga de Primera | 22 | 3 | — | | 1 (Note: One appearances Copa Sudamericana) | 0 | — | | 23 | 3 |
| Audax Italiano | Total | | 36 | 3 | 2 | 0 | 1 | 0 | 0 | 0 | 39 | 3 |
| Veracruz (loan) | 2018–19 | Liga MX | 16 | 1 | 5 | 1 | — | | — | | 21 | 2 |
| Audax Italiano | 2019 | Liga de Primera | 4 | 0 | 2 | 0 | — | | — | | 6 | 0 |
| Coquimbo Unido | 2020 | Liga de Primera | 31 | 6 | — | | 10 (Note: One appearances Copa Sudamericana) | 2 | — | | 41 | 8 |
| Unión Española (loan) | 2021 | Liga de Primera | 6 | 0 | 2 | 0 | — | | — | | 8 | 0 |
| Ñublense (loan) | 2021 | Liga de Primera | 13 | 2 | — | | — | | — | | 13 | 2 |
| Coquimbo Unido | 2022 | Liga de Primera | 22 | 12 | 1 | 1 | — | | — | | 23 | 13 |
| Coquimbo Unido | 2023 | Liga de Primera | 7 | 2 | 1 | 0 | — | | — | | 8 | 2 |
| Coquimbo Unido | Total | | 29 | 14 | 2 | 1 | 0 | 0 | 0 | 0 | 31 | 15 |
| Palestino | 2023 | Liga de Primera | 14 | 3 | 2 | 0 | — | | — | | 16 | 3 |
| Palestino | 2024 | Liga de Primera | 29 | 5 | 4 | 0 | 13 (Note: Ten appearances Copa Libertadores and Three appearances Copa Sudamericana) | 0 | — | | 46 | 3 |
| Palestino | 2025 | Liga de Primera | 29 | 10 | 5 | 1 | 9 (Note: Appearances Copa Sudamericana) | 0 | — | | 43 | 11 |
| Palestino | 2026 | Liga de Primera | 1 | 0 | — | | — | | — | | 1 | 0 |
| Palestino | Total | | 73 | 18 | 11 | 1 | 22 | 0 | 0 | 0 | 106 | 17 |
| Career total | | | 268 | 51 | 32 | 5 | 33 | 2 | 0 | 0 | 329 | 54 |

== Honours ==
Individual

- Copa Sudamericana Ideal Team (1): 2020
