= Estadio Municipal de La Cisterna =

Stadium in Chile

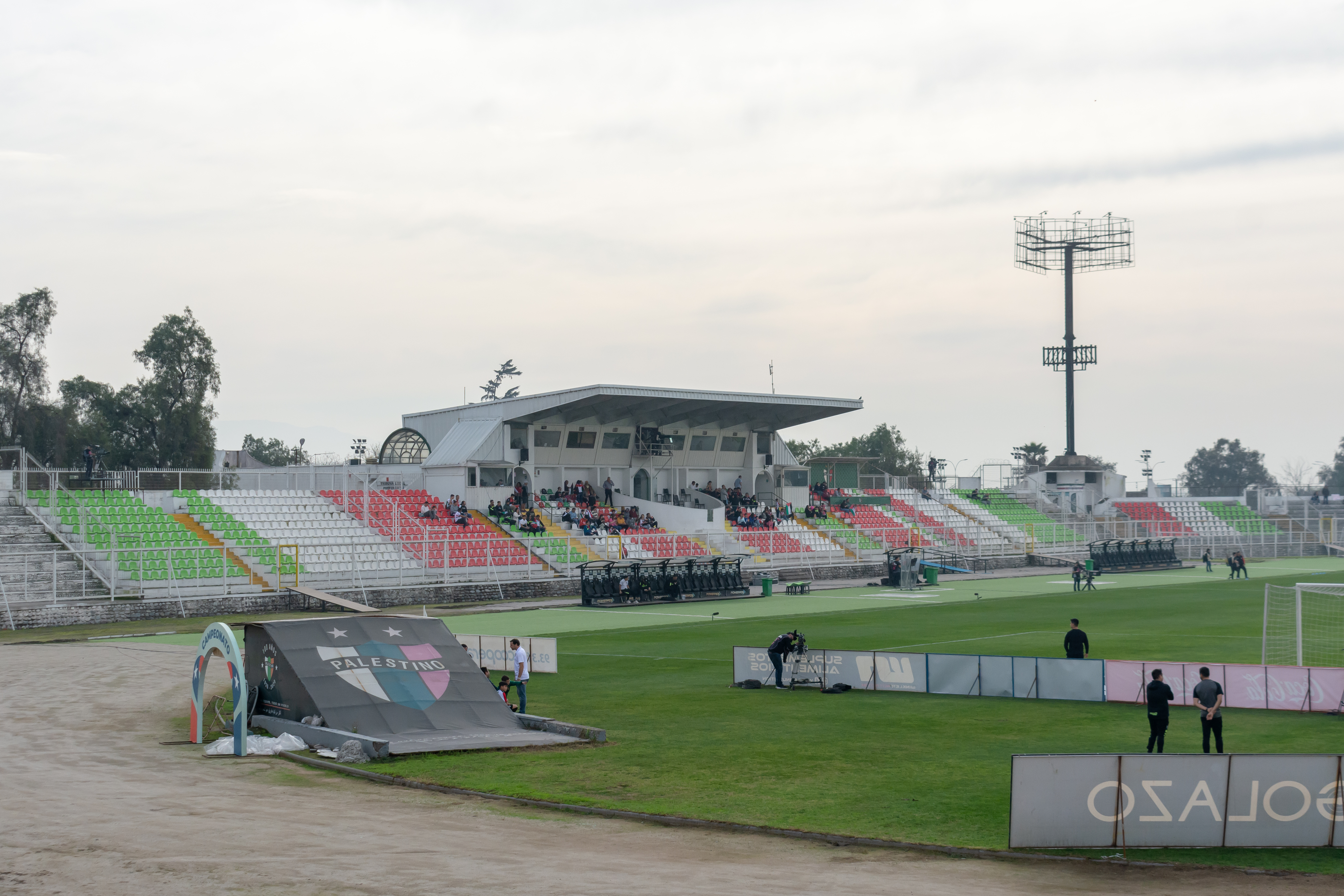
- Interactive map of Estadio Municipal de La Cisterna
- Location: La Cisterna, Santiago, Chile
- Coordinates: 33.521°S 70.673°W
- Owner: Municipality of La Cisterna
- Operator: Palestino
- Capacity: 8,000
- Surface: grass
- Field size: 105 x 68 m

Construction
- Built: 1988
- Opened: 22 September 1988; 37 years ago

Tenant
- Palestino

Estadio Municipal de La Cisterna is a multi-use stadium in Santiago, Chile. It is currently used mostly for football matches and hosts the home matches for Palestino. The stadium currently holds 8,000 people and was built in 1988.

The highest attendance at the Municipal de La Cisterna was 11,680 for a 0-0 Primera Division league match between Palestino and Universidad de Chile on October 16, 1988
