= Nicolás Meza =

Chilean footballer

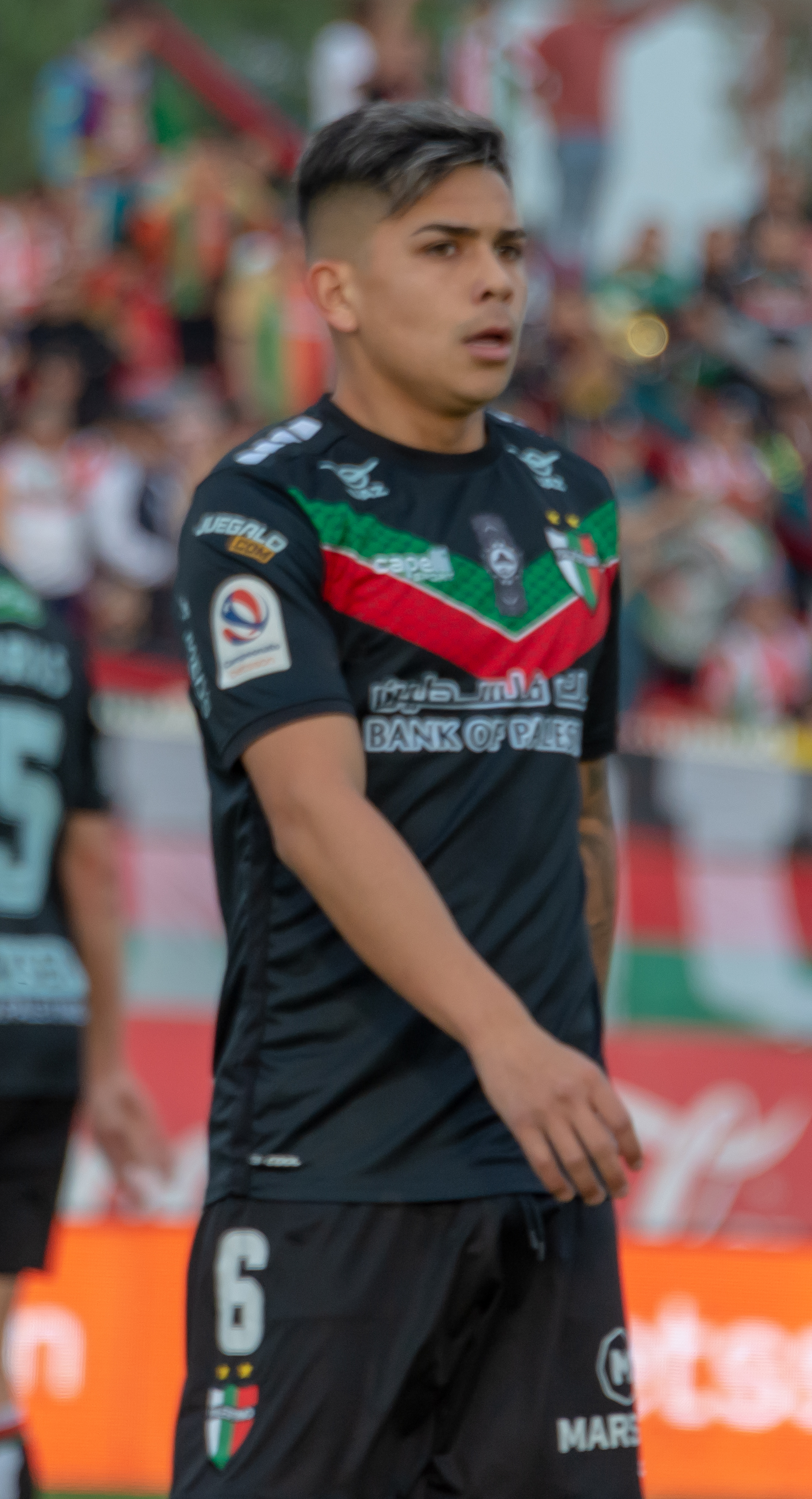
- Meza with Palestino in 2023.

Personal information
- Full name: Nicolás Alonso Meza Muñoz
- Date of birth: 12 April 2002 (age 24)
- Place of birth: San Ramón, Santiago, Chile
- Height: 1.72 m (5 ft 8 in)
- Position: Midfielder

Team information
- Current team: Palestino
- Number: 8

Youth career
- Palestino

Senior career*
Years	Team	Apps	(Gls)
2021–	Palestino	54	(0)
- * Club domestic league appearances and goals as of 25 February 2026

Nicolás Alonso Meza Muñoz (born 12 April 2002) is a Chilean footballer who plays as a midfielder for Chilean Primera División side Palestino.

== Club career ==
A product of Palestino, Meza was promoted to the first team in 2021 and made his senior debut in both matches against Barnechea for the 2021 Copa Chile on 22 and 27 June. He signed his first professional contract on 9 November of the same year.

On 15 November 2024, Meza renewed with Palestino until the 2026 season. On 10 May 2025, he suffered an Achilles tendon rupture in the match against Audax Italiano for the Copa Chile. He has taking part in the Copa Sudamericana in 2023 and 2025.
