= Ariel Martínez (Chilean footballer) =

Chilean footballer (born 1994)

Personal information
- Full name: Ariel Elías Martínez Arce
- Date of birth: 10 January 1994 (age 32)
- Place of birth: Santiago, Chile
- Height: 1.76 m (5 ft 9 in)
- Position: Midfielder

Team information
- Current team: Palestino
- Number: 10

Youth career
- Colo-Colo

Senior career*
Years	Team	Apps	(Gls)
2012–2014	Colo-Colo B	26	(1)
2012–2016	Colo-Colo	0	(0)
2014–2016	→ Coquimbo Unido (loan)	52	(6)
2017–2020	Audax Italiano	79	(8)
2021	Unión La Calera	12	(1)
2022–	Palestino	83	(5)
- * Club domestic league appearances and goals as of 6 October 2025

Ariel Elías Martínez Arce (born 10 January 1994) is a Chilean professional footballer who plays as a Midfielder for Chilean Primera División side Palestino.

== Club career ==
Martínez began his career at Colo-Colo B in the Chilean Segunda División in 2012. After a loan spell at Coquimbo Unido, he joined Audax Italiano in 2017. Martínez moved to Unión La Calera for the 2021 season.

In 2022, Martínez signed a one-year deal with Palestino with an option to renew at the end of the season. On November 17, 2022, Martínez extended his contract with Palestino until the end of the 2025 season.
