= Club Deportivo Palestino =

Chilean football club

Palestino
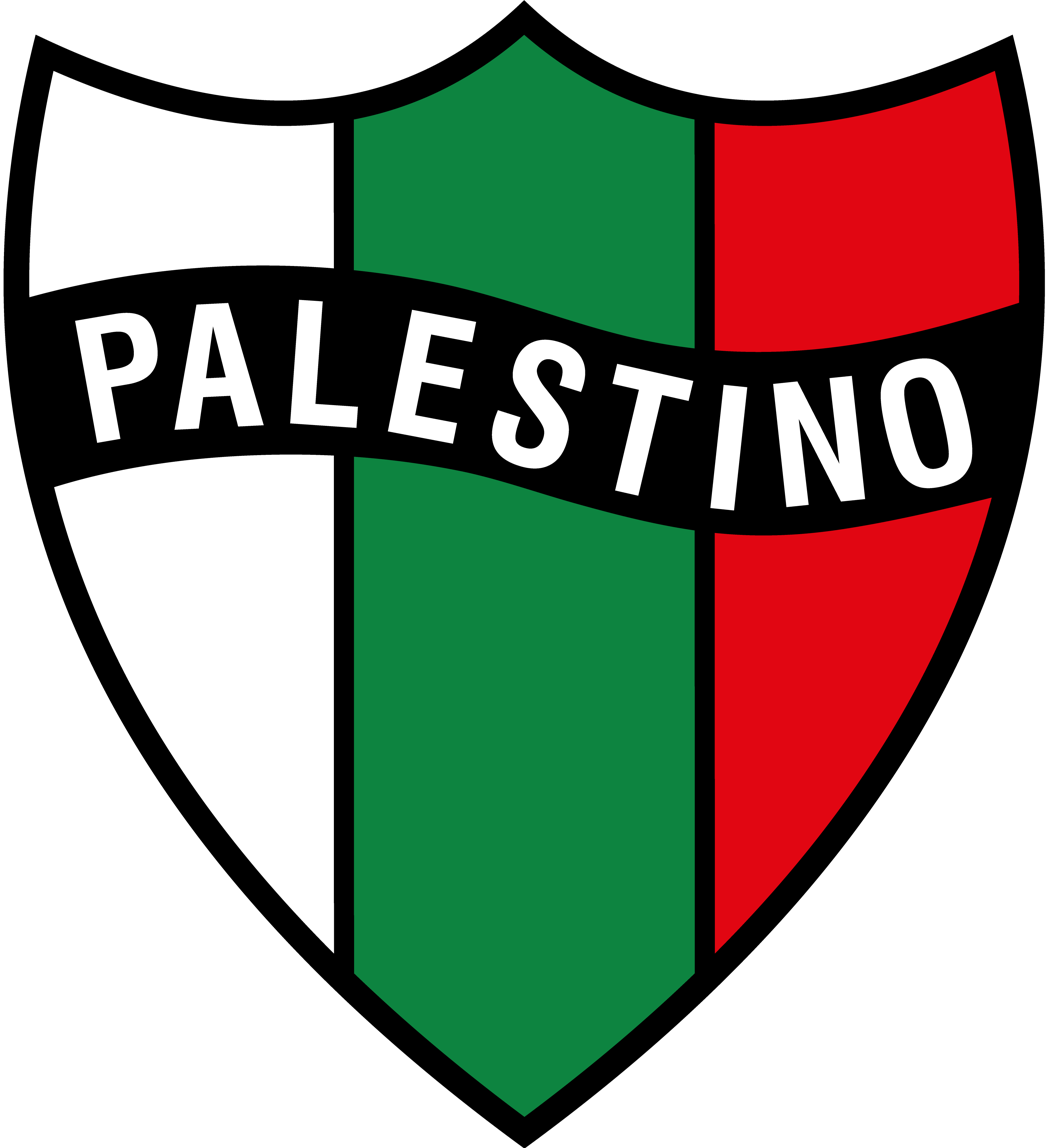
- Full name: Club Deportivo Palestino S.A.D.P.
- Nicknames: Árabes; Tino-Tino; Tricolor; Baisanos
- Founded: 8 August 1920; 106 years ago
- Ground: Estadio Municipal de La Cisterna
- Capacity: 8,500
- Chairman: Jorge Uauy
- Coach: Guillermo Farré
- League: Liga de Primera
- 2025: Liga de Primera, 6th of 16
- Website: www.palestino.cl
| Home colours | Away colours |

Club Deportivo Palestino is a professional football club based in the city of Santiago, Chile and plays in the Primera División de Chile.

Palestino was founded in 1920 by Palestinian immigrants, and the club has maintained a strong symbolic connection to Palestinian identity, using the colours of the Palestinian flag in its kit and incorporating a map of pre-1948 Palestine into its logo and uniforms.

It is known for public displays of solidarity with Palestinians, including fans chanting pro-Palestinian slogans and players once entering the field wearing keffiyehs. In 2014, the team was fined and banned by Chile’s football association for altering the number "1" on jerseys to resemble the outline of Mandatory Palestine.

The club has won two national titles and reached the semi-finals of the Copa Libertadores in 1979. The club is supported by Chile’s Palestinian community, the largest outside the Arab world, and Palestino also engages in community outreach, supporting women’s football and financing football schools in Palestine.

== History ==
The club was founded on 8 August 1920, when they participated in a colonial competition in Osorno. It was founded by a group of Palestinians; the name of the club reflects the origin in Chile's Palestinian community. According to American historian Brenda Elsey,

"Leaders of the Arab immigrant community who hoped to find a niche within popular culture for their organizations decided to participate in football once again in 1940s".

In 1952, the Football Federation of Chile set up the first professional leagues. Palestino was accepted into the Second Division, which they won to attain promotion to the Primera División. In 1955, the club won their first national championship under the coaching of Argentine captain Roberto Coll. In that era, the club became known by the nickname millonario (Millionaire) because of their ability to attract top class footballers.

In 1978, the club won their second league title; this time the team was led by Chilean captain Elías Figueroa. In this campaign, they set a new record in the domestic tournament for the number of games unbeaten and soon won the Copa Chile to claim the league and cup double. In 2004, the club became a registered company, but the change of status did not bring the expected improvement in results. In 2006, they finished in 18th place out of 20 teams, forcing them to win a play-off against Fernandez Vial to keep their place in the top flight.

In the early 2000s, Chilean-Palestinian coach Nicola Hadwa recruited diaspora players for the Palestine national team. One notable player, Roberto Kettlun, born and raised in Chile, chose to represent Palestine and eventually moved to the West Bank to play for clubs such as Hilal Al-Quds and Ahli Al-Khaleel. He later returned to Palestino as sporting director, aiding in player recruitment and club development.

Palestino ended a 40-year trophy drought in 2018 by winning the Copa Chile, defeating Audax Italiano in the finals. Former Inter Milan and West Ham player Luis Jiménez, a Palestino academy graduate, returned late in his career to captain the team to victory. Following their domestic success, Palestino competed in the 2019 Copa Libertadores, facing top clubs such as Club Atlético River Plate and SC Internacional. While they did not progress far, the campaign elevated the club’s profile. As of October 2023, renewed conflict in Gaza has led the club to increase awareness and fundraising efforts related to Palestine.

== Club image and culture ==
Mimicking the Flag of Palestine, the club's traditional colors have been red, green and black. Not only from Palestinians in Chile, Palestino has also attracted the support from Gaza sympathisers in the country and are considered as the "second national team" of Palestine.

Palestino have rivalries with other immigrant-founded Santiago clubs in the Chilean Primera División, mainly Unión Española (founded by Spanish immigrants) and Audax Italiano (founded by Italian immigrants). These games are known as the "Diaspora Derby" (Spanish: Clásico de Colonias).

In January 2014, Palestino was fined the equivalent of $1,300 for using a new team jersey in the club's traditional colors, but with the number one in the squad numbers on the back shaped as the map of Mandatory Palestine. Jewish communities in Chile and the Israeli government complained about the political significance of this, with a formal complaint to their national Federation being made by Patrick Kiblisky, owner of first-division club Ñublense. The jerseys were said to have been first used in December 2013, although the club said they were used in the prior season. The federation banned the club from using the map on the back of the shirts and imposed a fine on the club on the grounds that the Federation is opposed to "any form of political, religious, sexual, ethnic, social or racial discrimination". On its Facebook page, the club stated:

"For us, free Palestine will always be historical Palestine, nothing less."

== Honours ==
- Primera División
  - Winners (2): 1955, 1978
- Copa Chile
  - Winners (3): 1975, 1977, 2018
- Primera B
  - Winners (2): 1952, 1972

== Current squad ==
As of 11 August 2026

Note: Flags indicate national team as defined under FIFA eligibility rules; some limited exceptions apply. Players may hold more than one non-FIFA nationality.

| No. | Pos. | Nation | Player |
|---|---|---|---|
| 1 | GK | CHI | Sebastián Salas |
| 2 | DF | CHI | Vicente Espinoza |
| 3 | DF | CHI | Enzo Roco |
| 4 | DF | CHI | Antonio Ceza |
| 5 | MF | ARG | Dylan Glaby (loan from Coquimbo Unido) |
| 7 | FW | CHI | Bryan Carrasco (c) |
| 8 | MF | CHI | Nicolás Meza |
| 9 | FW | CHI | Ronnie Fernández |
| 10 | MF | CHI | Ariel Martínez |
| 11 | MF | ARG | Jonathan Benítez |
| 12 | GK | CHI | Renato Canto |
| 13 | FW | CHI | Albert Gómez |
| 14 | MF | CHI | Joe Abrigo |
| 15 | MF | CHI | Francisco Montes |
| 16 | DF | CHI | José Bizama |
| 17 | MF | ARG | Marcelo Eggel (loan from Deportivo Maipú) |

| No. | Pos. | Nation | Player |
|---|---|---|---|
| 18 | MF | URU | Sebastián Gallegos |
| 19 | FW | ARG | Nelson Da Silva |
| 20 | FW | CHI | Gonzalo Tapia |
| 21 | FW | CHI | Martín Araya |
| 22 | DF | CHI | Simón Pinto |
| 23 | DF | CHI | Jason León |
| 24 | FW | CHI | Dilan Salgado |
| 25 | GK | CHI | Sebastián Pérez |
| 26 | GK | CHI | Maximiliano Mateluna |
| 27 | FW | CHI | César Munder |
| 28 | DF | CHI | Dilan Zúñiga |
| 29 | DF | CHI | Ian Garguez |
| 30 | FW | CHI | Ian Alegría |
| 31 | DF | CHI | Gaspar Ruz |
| 33 | FW | CHI | Leonardo Díaz |
| 34 | DF | CHI | Mateo Cienfuegos |

=== 2026 Winter Transfers ===
==== In ====
Note: Flags indicate national team as defined under FIFA eligibility rules; some limited exceptions apply. Players may hold more than one non-FIFA nationality.

| No. / Pos. / Nation / Player; 5 / MF / ARG / Dylan Glaby (loan from Coquimbo Unido) | No. / Pos. / Nation / Player; 17 / MF / ARG / Marcelo Eggel (loan from Deportivo Maipú) |

==== Out ====
Note: Flags indicate national team as defined under FIFA eligibility rules; some limited exceptions apply. Players may hold more than one non-FIFA nationality.

| No. / Pos. / Nation / Player; 5 / MF / ARG / Julián Fernández (loan to Atlético Tucumán) | No. / Pos. / Nation / Player; 6 / DF / ARG / Fernando Meza (released) |

== Notable players ==
- (Argentina) Juan Carlos Moreno
- (Chile) Manuel Araya
- (Chile) Marcelo Corrales
- (Chile) Rodolfo Dubó
- (Chile) (Argentina) Oscar Fabbiani
- (Chile) Elías Figueroa
- (Chile) Pedro Pinto
- (Palestine) (Chile) Roberto Bishara
- (Palestine) (Israel) Shadi Shaaban

== Managers ==
- (Chile) Luis Tirado (1952)
- (Argentina) (Chile) Antonio Ciraolo (1953)
- (Socialist Federal Republic of Yugoslavia) Miodrag Stefanović (1955–57)
- (Argentina) Antonio de Mare (1958–59)
- (Argentina) (Italy) Alejandro Scopelli (1960)
- (Chile) Hugo Tassara (1961–62)
- (Argentina) José Della Torre (1963)
- (Hungary) (Chile) Ladislao Pakozdi (1963)
- (Argentina) Miguel Mocciola (1964)
- (Chile) José Valdebenito (1964)
- (Brazil) Zezé Moreira (1964)
- (Uruguay) Enrique Fernández (1965)
- (Argentina) Alejandro Scopelli (1966)
- (Chile) Óscar Andrade (1967)
- (Argentina) Julio Baldovinos (1967)
- (Uruguay) Adolfo Rodríguez (1968–69)
- (Chile) Sergio Lecea (1969)
- (Chile) Isaac Carrasco (1970)
- (Chile) Héctor Ortega (1970)
- (Chile) Dante Pesce (1971)
- (Argentina) Alejandro Scopelli (1971)
- (Uruguay) Adolfo Rodríguez (1972)
- (Chile) Humberto Díaz (1972)
- (Argentina) (Chile) Néstor Isella (1973)
- (Chile) Humberto Díaz (1973)
- (Chile) Caupolicán Peña (1974–76)
- (Chile) Fernando Riera (1977)
- (Chile) Caupolicán Peña (1977–80)
- (Chile) Gustavo Cortés (1980)
- (Chile) Mario Tuane (1980–81)
- (Chile) Gustavo Cortés (1981–83)
- (Chile) Sasha Mitjaew (1984)
- (Brazil) Elson Beiruth (1984)
- (Chile) Gustavo Cortés (1984–85)
- (Chile) Víctor Manuel Castañeda (1986)
- (Chile) Orlando Aravena (1986–87)
- (Chile) Víctor Manuel Castañeda (1988)
- (Chile) Luis Ibarra (1988)
- (Chile) Eugenio Jara (1988–89)
- (Chile) Orlando Aravena (1989)
- (Chile) Víctor Manuel Castañeda (1989)
- (Peru) Guillermo Duarte (1990)
- (Chile) Manuel Pellegrini (1990)
- (Chile) Jorge Zelada (1991)
- (Chile) Manuel Pellegrini (1991–92)
- (Argentina) (Chile) Fernando Cavalleri (1992)
- (Chile) Gustavo Cortés (1992–93)
- (Argentina) Ricardo Dabrowski (1993)
- (Chile) José Sulantay (1994)
- (Chile) Elías Figueroa (1994–95)
- (Chile) Germán Cornejo (1995–96)
- (Chile) Orlando Aravena (1996)
- (Chile) Jorge Aravena (1996–97)
- (Chile) Manuel Pellegrini (1998)
- (Argentina) Juan Carlos Carotti (1998)
- (Argentina) Ricardo Dabrowski (1998–2001)
- (Chile) Fernando Carvallo (2002)
- (Chile) Daniel Salvador (2003)
- (Palestine) (Chile) Nicola Hadwa (2004)
- (Chile) Ricardo Toro (2004)
- (Chile) Horacio Rivas (2004–05)
- (Chile) Fernando Carvallo (2005)
- (Chile) Daniel Salvador (2006)
- (Chile) Jaime Pizarro (2006–07)
- (Chile) Jorge Aravena (2007)
- (Chile) Luis Musrri (2007–09)
- (Chile) Jorge Aravena (2009–10)
- (Chile) Jaime Escobar (2010)
- (Paraguay) Gustavo Benítez (2010–11)
- (Uruguay) José Daniel Carreño (2012)
- (Chile) Emiliano Astorga (2012–14)
- (Chile) Jaime Escobar (2014)
- (Argentina) Pablo Guede (2014–16)
- (Chile) Nicolás Córdova (2016–17)
- (Chile) Omar Toloza (2017)
- (Argentina) Germán Cavalieri (2017–18)
- (Argentina) Sebastián Méndez (2018)
- (Chile) Ivo Basay (2018–2020)
- (Chile) José Luis Sierra (2020–21)
- (Argentina) Patricio Graff (2021)
- (Argentina) Gustavo Costas (2022)
- (Argentina) Pablo Sánchez (2023–24)
- (Chile) Jorge Schwager (2024)
- (Argentina) Lucas Bovaglio (2024–25)
- (Chile) Cristián Muñoz (2026)
- (Argentina) Guillermo Farré (2026–)

== Women's team ==
The Palestino women's team plays in the Campeonato Nacional Primera División de Fútbol Femenino, the top women's football competition in Chile.

In 2015 they won the Clausura tournament, thus ending a ten-season title streak by Colo-Colo. The captain, Ashraf Khatib, lifted the title. She was quoted as saying it was a pleasure to be the first actual Palestinian woman to lift the title in Chile.

Former Palestino forward María José Urrutia was a member of the Chile women's national football team for the 2019 FIFA Women's World Cup. With a header against Thailand in Chile's 2–0 win in the group stage, she became the first Chilean player to score a goal in the FIFA Women's World Cup.

Former Palestino defender Javiera Toro was also a member of the Chilean team at the 2019 tournament.

Current Palestinian national team player Rania Sansur currently plays for the club.

== See also ==
- Palestinian community in Chile
