= 2023 Campeonato Nacional Primera B =

Primera B de Chile
- Season: 2023
- Dates: 10 February – 10 December 2023
- Champions: Cobreloa (1st title)
- Promoted: Cobreloa; Deportes Iquique
- Relegated: Deportes Puerto Montt
- Matches: 252
- Goals: 649 (2.58 per match)
- Top goalscorer: Rodrigo Contreras (17 goals)
- Biggest home win: Antofagasta 6–0 Dep. Temuco (29 April)
- Biggest away win: Santa Cruz 0–3 La Serena (27 February); Cobreloa 1–4 Antofagasta (2 April); Puerto Montt 1–4 Antofagasta (21 May); Rangers 1–4 Dep. Iquique (21 May); Santiago Morning 0–3 La Serena (29 May); La Serena 0–3 Santa Cruz (17 July); Santiago Morning 0–3 Dep. Iquique (27 August); Puerto Montt 0–3 Barnechea (9 October)
- Highest scoring: Barnechea 4–3 La Serena (10 September); San Marcos 4–3 Antofagasta (9 October)

The 2023 Primera B de Chile, known as Campeonato Ascenso Betsson 2023 for sponsorship purposes until 15 October 2023, was the 69th season of the Primera B de Chile, Chile's second-tier football league. The fixture for the season was announced on 11 January 2023, with the competition starting on 10 February and ending on 10 December 2023.

Cobreloa won their first Primera B championship in this tournament, securing both the title as well as promotion to the Chilean Primera División with a 2–1 victory over Rangers on the final round of the regular season on 15 October. Deportes Iquique were the other promoted team, defeating Santiago Wanderers in the promotion play-off finals to claim the remaining promotion spot.

== Format ==
The 16 participating teams played each other in a double round-robin tournament (once at home and once away) for a total of 30 matches, with the top team at the end of the 30 rounds winning the championship as well as promotion to the Campeonato Nacional for the following season. The play-off tournament to decide the second promoted team (Liguilla) was expanded from five to seven teams, which were the ones placing from second to eighth place, and the league runners-up received a bye to the semi-finals. The playoffs winning team was the second and last promoted team to the top flight for the following season. The bottom-placed team at the end of the regular season was relegated to the Segunda División Profesional.

== Teams ==
Locations of the 2023 Primera B de Chile teams
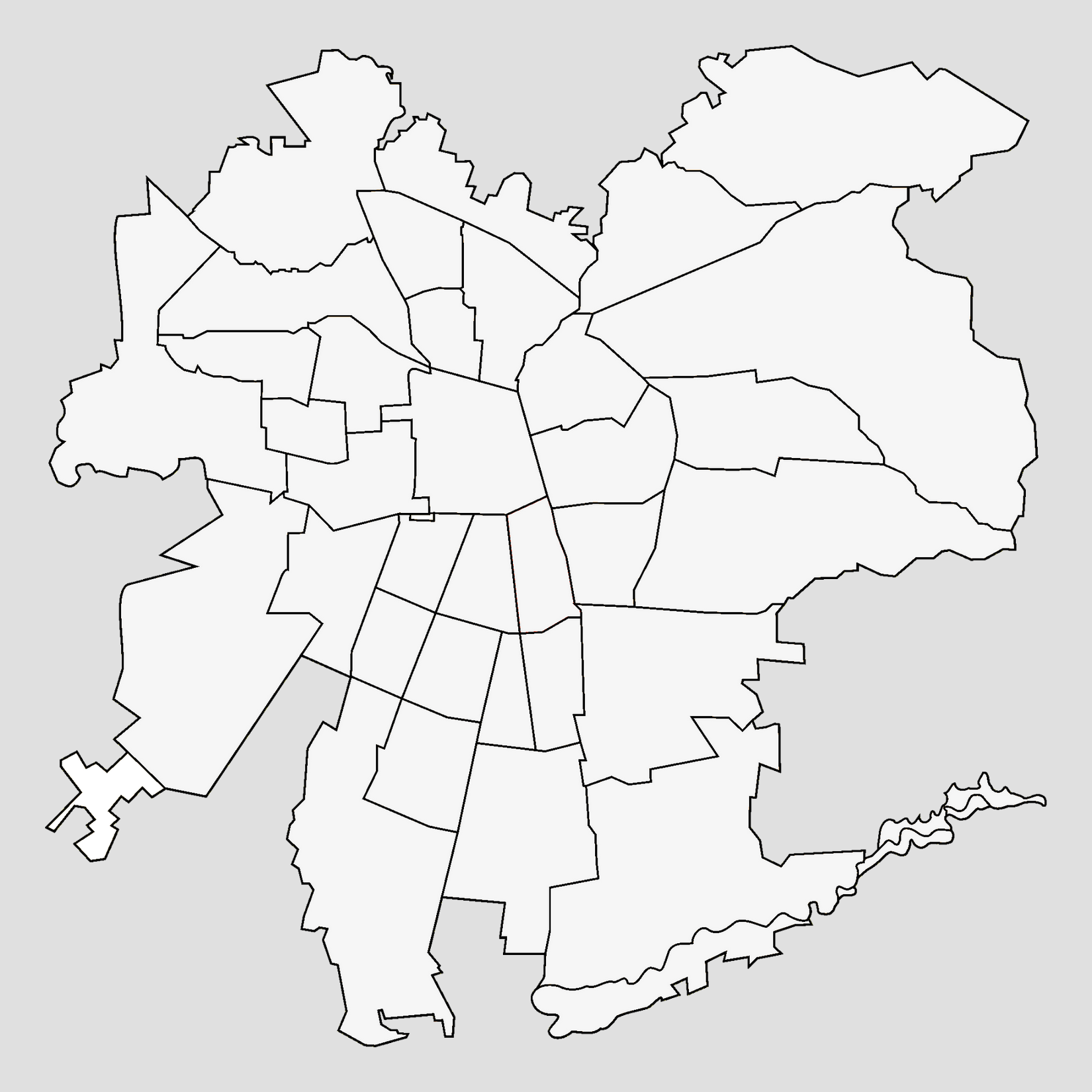
Locations of the 2023 Primera B de Chile teams in Santiago.

The tournament was played by 16 teams, 13 returning from the previous season, two relegated from the 2022 Campeonato Nacional (Deportes La Serena and Deportes Antofagasta), and the 2022 Segunda División Profesional champions San Marcos de Arica. These teams replaced Magallanes and Deportes Copiapó, who were promoted to the 2023 Campeonato Nacional, as well as Fernández Vial and Deportes Melipilla, both relegated to Segunda División for this season.

=== Stadia and locations ===
Club	City	Stadium	Capacity
Barnechea	Santiago (Lo Barnechea)	Municipal de Lo Barnechea	3,000
Cobreloa	Calama	Zorros del Desierto	12,346
Deportes Antofagasta	Antofagasta	Calvo y Bascuñán	21,178
Deportes Iquique	Iquique	Tierra de Campeones	13,171
Deportes La Serena	La Serena	La Portada	18,243
Deportes Puerto Montt	Puerto Montt	Chinquihue	10,000
Deportes Recoleta	Santiago (Recoleta)	Leonel Sánchez Lineros	1,000
Deportes Santa Cruz	Santa Cruz	Joaquín Muñoz García	5,000
Deportes Temuco	Temuco	Germán Becker	18,413
Rangers	Talca	Fiscal de Talca	8,200
San Luis	Quillota	Lucio Fariña Fernández	7,680
San Marcos de Arica	Arica	Carlos Dittborn	9,746
Santiago Morning	Santiago (La Pintana)	Municipal de La Pintana	6,000
Santiago Wanderers	Valparaíso	Elías Figueroa Brander	20,575
Unión San Felipe	San Felipe	Municipal de San Felipe	12,000
Universidad de Concepción	Concepción	Alcaldesa Ester Roa Rebolledo	30,448

== Standings ==
Pos	Team	Pld	W	D	L	GF	GA	GD	Pts	Qualification or relegation
1	Cobreloa (C, P)	30	16	6	8	41	30	+11	54	Promotion to Primera División
2	Deportes Iquique (P)	30	14	10	6	54	39	+15	52	Advance to Promotion play-off semi-finals
3	Santiago Wanderers	30	14	9	7	37	28	+9	51	Advance to Promotion play-off quarter-finals
4	Deportes Temuco	30	13	9	8	38	36	+2	48	Advance to Promotion play-off quarter-finals
5	Deportes Antofagasta	30	14	4	12	50	38	+12	46	Advance to Promotion play-off quarter-finals
6	San Luis	30	12	8	10	43	31	+12	44	Advance to Promotion play-off quarter-finals
7	Deportes La Serena	30	13	5	12	38	39	−1	44	Advance to Promotion play-off quarter-finals
8	Unión San Felipe	30	11	8	11	40	34	+6	41	Advance to Promotion play-off quarter-finals
9	Barnechea	30	11	8	11	40	41	−1	41	
10	San Marcos de Arica	30	11	7	12	51	52	−1	40	
11	Rangers	30	10	6	14	35	47	−12	36	
12	Santiago Morning	30	9	7	14	32	38	−6	34	
13	Deportes Santa Cruz	30	8	10	12	27	35	−8	34	
14	Universidad de Concepción	30	9	7	14	36	49	−13	34	
15	Deportes Recoleta	30	7	9	14	34	43	−9	30	
16	Deportes Puerto Montt (R)	30	7	9	14	25	41	−16	30	Relegation to Segunda División Profesional

Source: ANFP, Soccerway
Rules for classification: 1) Points, 2) Goal difference, 3) Matches won, 4) Goals for, 5) Away goals for, 6) Red cards, 7) Yellow cards, 8) Drawing of lots, 9) Play-off game (only if needed to decide championship).
If needed to decide championship between two teams: 2) Play-off game.
(C) Champions; (P) Promoted; (R) Relegated

== Results ==
Home \ Away	BAR	COB	ANT	IQQ	DLS	DPM	REC	DSC	TEM	RAN	SLQ	SMA	SM	SW	USF	UDC
Barnechea	—	1–1	2–0	0–0	4–3	2–1	1–0	1–0	1–2	1–2	0–0	3–3	1–1	0–1	2–0	2–0
Cobreloa	0–1	—	1–4	1–0	1–0	1–0	3–0	2–0	1–0	2–0	1–0	2–1	2–1	2–0	1–0	2–1
Deportes Antofagasta	2–0	2–1	—	2–3	0–1	1–1	3–0	1–0	6–0	2–2	1–0	4–1	1–0	0–1	1–2	3–1
Deportes Iquique	2–3	2–2	3–0	—	3–2	1–1	2–1	1–0	1–1	1–2	3–2	2–1	2–2	3–2	1–2	1–3
Deportes La Serena	4–2	1–0	1–1	0–3 (Note: Match awarded 3–0 to Deportes Iquique due to Deportes La Serena fielding an ineligible player. It had originally ended in a 0–0 draw.)	—	1–2	1–0	0–3	1–0	0–0	2–2	1–1	0–1	3–1	2–0	1–0
Deportes Puerto Montt	0–3	0–0	1–4	2–2	1–2	—	2–1	1–2	0–0	1–0	0–1	1–1	1–0	0–2	1–1	1–2
Deportes Recoleta	1–2	1–2	0–1	1–1	0–1	0–1	—	2–1	2–2	1–2	2–3	1–1	1–1	4–1	2–1	2–1
Deportes Santa Cruz	1–0	1–1	1–0	1–2	0–3	1–0	1–1	—	1–1	2–2	1–1	1–0	1–1	1–2	0–2	1–1
Deportes Temuco	3–2	2–1	2–1	2–1	2–0	1–2	1–1	1–1	—	3–0	1–2	1–1	0–2	2–1	2–1	2–1
Rangers	1–0	1–2	1–1	1–4	0–2	3–1	1–2	2–1	1–2	—	2–1	4–2	0–2	0–0	1–3	1–0
San Luis	2–2	2–1	3–1	0–1	5–0	0–0	1–1	4–1	1–0	0–0	—	2–3	1–0	2–0	1–2	2–3
San Marcos de Arica	3–1	2–1	4–3	2–3	2–1	2–0	3–2	3–2	1–2	2–1	1–0	—	2–2	1–2	0–2	5–0
Santiago Morning	5–1	0–2	1–2	0–3	0–3	2–2	0–1	0–1	0–1	2–1	1–0	2–1	—	0–0	2–1	3–1
Santiago Wanderers	1–1	2–0	3–0	1–1	2–1	3–1	1–1	0–0	1–0	0–1	0–0	1–1	2–0	—	3–2	1–1
Unión San Felipe	0–0	2–2	1–0	1–1	1–1	0–1	1–2	0–0	1–1	4–1	1–3	3–0	2–1	0–1	—	4–1
Universidad de Concepción	2–1	3–3	1–3	1–1	2–0	2–0	1–1	0–1	1–1	3–2	0–2	2–1	2–0	0–2	0–0	—

Source: ANFP, Soccerway
Legend: Blue = home team win; Yellow = draw; Red = away team win.

== Promotion play-off ==
The teams placed from 2nd to 8th place in the regular season played a double-legged knockout competition with the regular season runner-up getting a bye to the semi-finals. The winning side claimed the last promotion spot to the Campeonato Nacional for the next season.

=== Bracket ===
Quarter-finals
6	San Luis	1	1	2 (5)
5	Deportes Antofagasta (p)	1	1	2 (6)
7	Deportes La Serena	1	0	1 (1)
4	Deportes Temuco (p)	0	1	1 (3)
8	Unión San Felipe	2	0	2
3	Santiago Wanderers	1	2	3

Semi-finals
5	Deportes Antofagasta	2	0	2
2	Deportes Iquique	2	3	5
4	Deportes Temuco	2	0	2
3	Santiago Wanderers	3	1	4

Finals
3	Santiago Wanderers	1	3	4 (2)
2	Deportes Iquique (p)	1	3	4 (3)

=== Quarter-finals ===
10 November 2023
19:00 UTC−3

Unión San Felipe	2–1	Santiago Wanderers
Monreal 47'; Briceño 87'	Report	Meza 18' (o.g.)

Estadio Municipal, San Felipe
Referee: Diego Flores
15 November 2023
19:00 UTC−3

Santiago Wanderers	2–0	Unión San Felipe
Zeballos 32'; Heredia 47' (o.g.)	Report

Estadio Municipal Lucio Fariña Fernández, Quillota
Referee: Héctor Jona

Santiago Wanderers won 3–2 on aggregate.

8 November 2023
18:00 UTC−3

Deportes La Serena	1–0	Deportes Temuco
Sánchez Sotelo 2'	Report

Estadio La Portada, La Serena
Referee: Juan Sepúlveda
14 November 2023
20:30 UTC−3

Deportes Temuco	1–0	Deportes La Serena
Núñez 43'	Report
Penalties
González (penalty scored); Márquez (penalty scored); Estigarribia (penalty missed); Urra (penalty scored)	3–1	(penalty scored) Sánchez Sotelo; (penalty missed) E. Espinoza; (penalty missed) F. Espinoza; (penalty missed) Alarcón

Estadio Municipal Germán Becker, Temuco
Attendance: 5,626
Referee: Fernando Véjar

Tied 1–1 on aggregate, Deportes Temuco won on penalties.

9 November 2023
18:00 UTC−3

San Luis	1–1	Deportes Antofagasta
Gaete 72'	Report	Contreras 20'

Estadio Municipal Lucio Fariña Fernández, Quillota
Referee: Víctor Abarzúa
14 November 2023
18:00 UTC−3

Deportes Antofagasta	1–1	San Luis
Guerra 78'	Report	Suazo 75'
Penalties
Contreras (penalty missed); Guerra (penalty scored); Robles (penalty scored); Cuadra (penalty scored); Hurtado (penalty scored); Cordero (penalty scored); Díaz (penalty scored)	6–5	(penalty scored) Parada; (penalty scored) Moiraghi; (penalty scored) Bustos; (penalty missed) Gaete; (penalty scored) Vera; (penalty scored) Cáceres; (penalty missed) Viveros

Estadio Regional Calvo y Bascuñán, Antofagasta
Referee: Cristian Garay

Tied 2–2 on aggregate, Deportes Antofagasta won on penalties.

=== Semi-finals ===
19 November 2023
18:00 UTC−3

Deportes Antofagasta	2–2	Deportes Iquique
Guerra 59'; Contreras 64'	Report	Puch 72' (pen.); Moya 77'

Estadio Regional Calvo y Bascuñán, Antofagasta
Referee: José Cabero
26 November 2023
18:00 UTC−3

Deportes Iquique	3–0	Deportes Antofagasta
Liuzzi 31' (o.g.); Pinto 89'; Ramos 90+1'	Report

Estadio Tierra de Campeones, Iquique
Referee: Felipe González

Deportes Iquique won 5–2 on aggregate.

19 November 2023
18:00 UTC−3

Deportes Temuco	2–3	Santiago Wanderers
Estigarribia 76'; Sáez 90+1'	Report	Gatica 14', 87'; Duma 26'

Estadio Municipal Germán Becker, Temuco
Referee: Cristián Garay
26 November 2023
18:00 UTC−3

Santiago Wanderers	1–0	Deportes Temuco
Duma 68'	Report

Estadio Elías Figueroa Brander, Valparaíso
Referee: Fernando Véjar

Santiago Wanderers won 4–2 on aggregate.

=== Finals ===
4 December 2023
19:00 UTC−3

Santiago Wanderers	1–1	Deportes Iquique
Pereyra 70'	Report	Ramos 85'

Estadio Elías Figueroa Brander, Valparaíso
Referee: Francisco Gilabert
10 December 2023
19:00 UTC−3

Deportes Iquique	3–3	Santiago Wanderers
Ramos 40' (pen.); Fernández 45+5' (pen.); Pino 51'	Report	Gatica 14'; Muñoz 66'; Duma 81'
Penalties
Delgado (penalty scored); Ledesma (penalty missed); González (penalty scored); Orellana (penalty missed); Navarro (penalty missed); Magalhães (penalty scored)	3–2	(penalty missed) Cañete; (penalty scored) Muñoz; (penalty missed) Santander; (penalty missed) Pereyra; (penalty scored) Miranda; (penalty missed) Plaza

Estadio Tierra de Campeones, Iquique
Referee: José Cabero

Tied 4–4 on aggregate, Deportes Iquique won on penalties and promoted to the Chilean Primera División.

== Top scorers ==
Rank	Player	Club	Goals
1	(Argentina) Rodrigo Contreras	Deportes Antofagasta	17
2	(Argentina) Juan Sánchez Sotelo	Deportes La Serena	16
2	(Chile) Humberto Suazo	San Luis	16
4	(Argentina) Lionel Altamirano	Rangers	15
4	(Venezuela) Luis Guerra	Deportes Antofagasta	15
4	(Chile) Álvaro Ramos	Deportes Iquique	15
7	(Chile) Mario Briceño	Unión San Felipe	13
8	(Uruguay) Luis Acevedo	Deportes Temuco	12
8	(Chile) Ignacio Herrera	Barnechea	12
10	(Chile) Roberto Riveros	Deportes Recoleta	11

Source: Soccerway

== See also ==
- 2023 Chilean Primera División
- 2023 Copa Chile
- 2023 Supercopa de Chile
