= Francisco Sasmay =

Chilean footballer (born 1998)

Personal information
- Full name: Francisco Nicolás Sasmay Torres
- Date of birth: 19 May 1998 (age 28)
- Place of birth: Chile
- Height: 1.74 m (5 ft 9 in)
- Positions: Left wing-back; left winger

Team information
- Current team: Rangers
- Number: 34

Senior career*
Years	Team	Apps	(Gls)
2016–2021	Deportes Antofagasta	7	(0)
2019–2021	→ Deportes Copiapó (loan)	20	(0)
2021	→ Coquimbo Unido (loan)	2	(0)
2022–	Rangers	0	(0)
- * Club domestic league appearances and goals as of 19 May 2022

Francisco Nicolás Sasmay Torres (born 19 May 1998) is a Chilean footballer who plays for Rangers.

== Honours ==
Coquimbo Unido

- Primera B (1): 2021
