= Marco Hidalgo =

Chilean footballer (born 1988)

Personal information
- Full name: Marco Antonio Hidalgo Zúñiga
- Date of birth: 13 September 1988 (age 38)
- Place of birth: Santiago, Chile
- Height: 1.70 m (5 ft 7 in)
- Position: Defender

Youth career
- Unión Española

Senior career*
Years	Team	Apps	(Gls)
2009–2013	Unión Española	18	(0)
2017	Unión Española B	9	(0)
2012–2013	→ Unión La Calera (loan)	12	(0)
2013	→ Universidad de Concepción (loan)	1	(0)
2013–2014	Deportes Temuco	25	(0)
2015	Cobreloa	16	(0)
2015–2016	Deportes Copiapó	16	(0)
2017	Deportes Recoleta	10	(0)
Total		107	(0)
- * Club domestic league appearances and goals

Marco Antonio Hidalgo Zúñiga (born 13 September 1988) is a Chilean former professional footballer who played as a defender.

== Career ==
A product of Unión Española, Hidalgo also played for Unión La Calera and Cobreloa in the Chilean Primera División.

In the second level, he played for Universidad de Concepción, Deportes Temuco and Deportes Copiapó.

In the Segunda División Profesional, he played for Unión Española B and Deportes Recoleta, his last club in 2017.

== Honours ==
Universidad de Concepción

- Primera B de Chile: 2013 Transición
