= Steffan Pino =

Chilean footballer

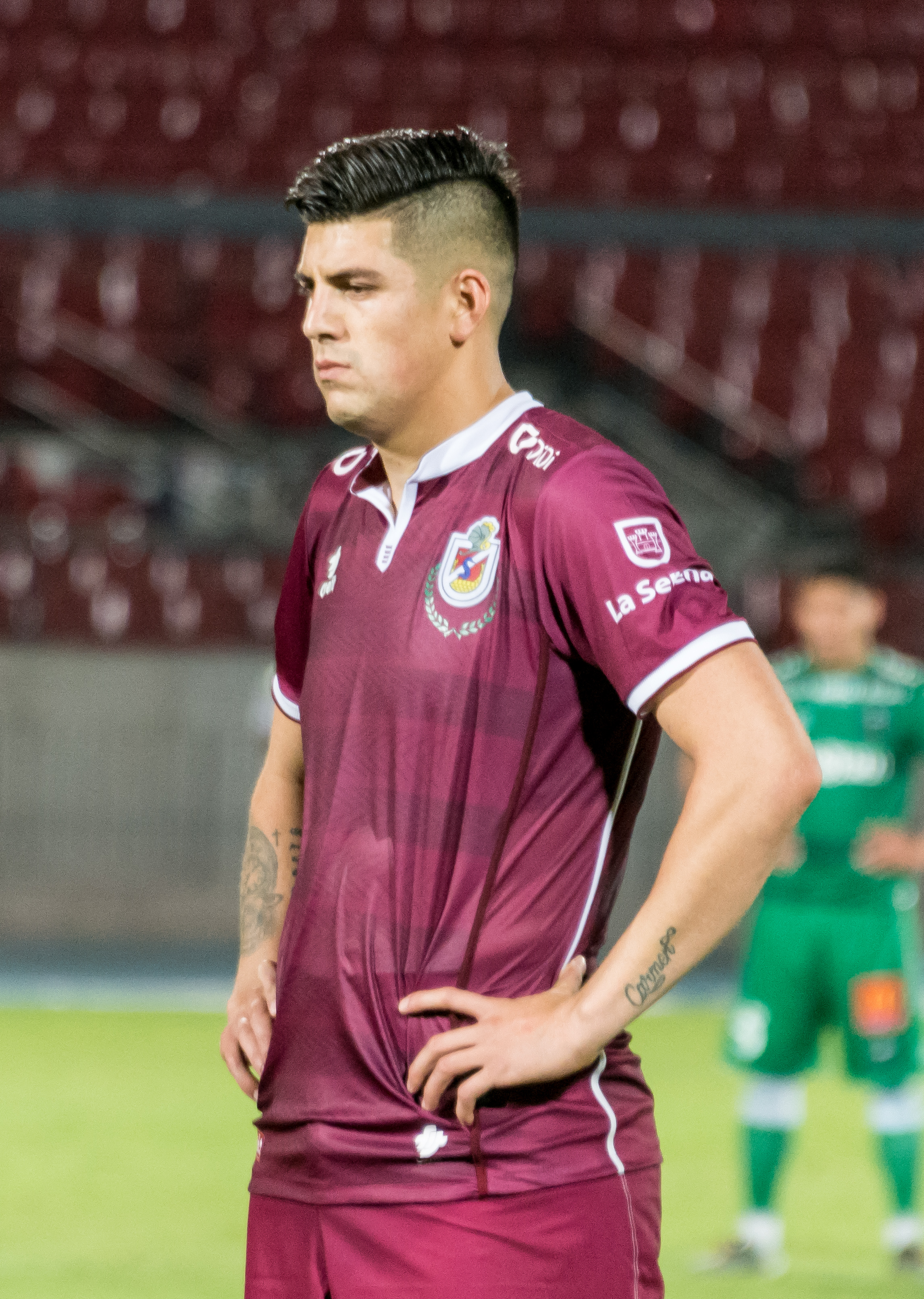
- Pino with Deportes La Serena in 2020

Personal information
- Full name: Steffan Patricio Pino Briceño
- Date of birth: 26 February 1994 (age 32)
- Place of birth: Recoleta, Santiago, Chile
- Height: 1.99 m (6 ft 6 in)
- Position: Striker

Team information
- Current team: Cobresal (on loan from Deportes Iquique)

Senior career*
Years	Team	Apps	(Gls)
2013–2015	Deportes Recoleta	–	(–)
2016	Deportes Temuco	0	(0)
2016–2017	Deportes Pintana	23	(8)
2017–2018	Deportes Recoleta	18	(12)
2018	→ Deportes Melipilla (loan)	16	(8)
2018–2021	Universidad de Concepción	20	(2)
2020	→ Deportes La Serena (loan)	4	(0)
2020–2021	→ Deportes Copiapó (loan)	16	(3)
2021–2022	Santiago Morning	57	(25)
2023–	Deportes Iquique	84	(28)
2026–	→ Cobresal (loan)	0	(0)

International career^{‡}
2025–	Chile	1	(1)
- * Club domestic league appearances and goals as of 8 January 2026 ‡ National team caps and goals as of 18 March 2025

Steffan Patricio Pino Briceño (born 26 February 1994) is a Chilean footballer who plays as a striker for Cobresal on loan from Deportes Iquique.

== Club career ==
Born in Recoleta commune, Santiago, Chile, Pino started his career with Deportes Recoleta in 2013, aged 19, in the Chilean Tercera B. In 2016, he moved to Deportes Temuco and, subsequently, to Deportes Pintana.

In the second half of 2017, Pino returned to Deportes Recoleta, and was loaned out to Deportes Melipilla the next year.

In August 2018, he signed with Universidad de Concepción in the Chilean Primera División, being loaned out to Deportes La Serena and Deportes Copiapó during 2020.

In 2021, Pino joined Santiago Morning. After scoring 14 goals in the 2021 season, he received an offer from Brazilian club Sport Recife, but Santiago Morning rejected it.

In November 2022, he signed with Deportes Iquique for the 2023 season, getting promotion to the top division for the 2024 season. In January 2026, Pino was loaned out to Cobresal.

== International career ==
As a player of Deportes Melipilla, Pino was called up to a training microcycle of the Chile national team under Reinaldo Rueda in May 2018.

In 2024, Pino was included in the Chile preliminary squad for the 2024 Copa América. He received his first official call-up for the friendly against Panama on 8 February 2025. He made his debut by replacing Nicolás Guerra at the minute 67 and scored a goal at the minute 82.

== Career statistics ==
=== International ===
As of match played 18 March 2025

Appearances and goals by national team and year
National team	Year	Apps	Goals
Chile	2025	1	1
Total		1	1

List of international goals scored by Steffan Pino
No.	Date	Venue	Opponent	Score	Result	Competition
1	8 February 2025	Estadio Nacional Julio Martínez Prádanos, Chile	Panama	6-1	6-1	Friendly
