= Jaime Vargas (footballer) =

Chilean footballer

Personal information
- Full name: Jaime Francisco Vargas González
- Date of birth: 28 October 2004 (age 22)
- Place of birth: San Vicente de Tagua Tagua, Chile
- Height: 1.94 m (6 ft 4 in)
- Position: Goalkeeper

Team information
- Current team: Deportes Recoleta
- Number: 22

Youth career
- 2016–2018: Universidad de Chile
- 2019: Escuela Bernardo Pavez
- 2019–2022: Deportes Recoleta

Senior career*
Years	Team	Apps	(Gls)
2022–	Deportes Recoleta	52	(0)
- * Club domestic league appearances and goals as of 30 September 2025

Jaime Francisco Vargas González (born 28 October 2004) is a Chilean professional footballer who plays as a goalkeeper for Deportes Recoleta.

== Club career ==
Born in San Vicente de Tagua Tagua, Chile, Vargas was with Universidad de Chile between the ages of 11 and 13. After a stint with Escuela de Fútbol Bernardo Pavez in his hometwon, he joined the Deportes Recoleta youth ranks in the second half of 2019.

He made his senior debut in the 2022 season, aged 17, under Felipe Núñez, and got regularity the next season. In March 2024, he suffered a meniscus tear and returned to play in September of the same year.

== International career ==
In August 2023, Vargas was called up to a training microcycle of the Chile national under-23 team under Eduardo Berizzo with views to the 2023 Pan American Games.

At senior level, Vargas received his first call up for the friendly match against Peru on 10 October 2025 under Sebastián Miranda.

== Personal life ==
In his early career, he started an undertaking in sale of fruits and vegetables as his family.
