= Federico Martin =

Argentine footballer

Personal information
- Full name: Andrea Federico Martin
- Date of birth: 6 February 1991 (age 35)
- Place of birth: San Carlos, Mendoza, Argentina
- Height: 1.83 m (6 ft 0 in)
- Position: Defensive midfielder

Team information
- Current team: Deportes Recoleta
- Number: 8

Youth career
- Godoy Cruz

Senior career*
Years	Team	Apps	(Gls)
2013–2014	Argentino de Mendoza	14	(3)
2014–2016	Jorge Newbery VM	49	(4)
2016–2017	Huracán Las Heras	22	(4)
2017	San Martín Mendoza	17	(1)
2018	Deportes Vallenar	0	(0)
2019	Pacífico	14	(2)
2019–2020	Desamparados	9	(0)
2020	Deportes Vallenar	18	(0)
2021–	Deportes Recoleta	87	(1)
- * Club domestic league appearances and goals as of 12 April 2024

Andrea Federico Martin (born 6 February 1991), known as Federico Martin, is an Argentine footballer who plays as a defensive midfielder for Chilean club Deportes Recoleta.

== Club career ==
Born in San Carlos, Mendoza, Martin is a product of Godoy Cruz. Martin has played in his homeland for Argentino de Mendoza, Jorge Newbery de Villa Mercedes, Huracán Las Heras, San Martín de Mendoza, Pacífico and Desamparados.

In 2018, he moved to Chile and had a stint with Deportes Vallenar. He rejoined them in 2020.

In 2021, Martin switched to Deportes Recoleta, winning the Segunda División Profesional and later becoming the team captain.

== Personal life ==
In addition to play football, he has also worked as a plumber, winery worker and seller of clothing.
