= Michael López (Chilean footballer) =

Chilean footballer (born 1989)

Personal information
- Full name: Michael Romilio López Medina
- Date of birth: 2 April 1989 (age 37)
- Place of birth: Conchalí, Santiago, Chile
- Height: 1.78 m (5 ft 10 in)
- Position: Defender

Senior career*
Years	Team	Apps	(Gls)
2011	Trasandino	–	(–)
2012	Unión San Felipe B	12	(2)
2012–2013	Unión San Felipe	10	(0)
2013–2014	Deportes Melipilla	18	(0)
2014–2015	Lota Schwager	6	(0)
2015–2016	Coquimbo Unido	10	(0)
2016–2017	Deportes Vallenar	28	(0)
2017	Deportes Melipilla	1	(0)
Total		85	(2)
- * Club domestic league appearances and goals

Michael Romilio López Medina (born 2 April 1989) is a Chilean former footballer who played as a left-back.

== Career ==
López's career started with a brief stint with Trasandino in 2012. Later that year, he joined Primera División de Chile side Unión San Felipe. He first appeared for the B team in the Segunda División de Chile, scoring two goals in twelve appearances throughout the season. He then made his professional first-team debut on 15 September 2012 in a Primera División home win against Deportes La Serena. He was sent off in his third appearance versus Deportes Iquique. He went onto play seven times in the following season, 2013, in Primera B de Chile before departing the club.

He joined Segunda División team Deportes Melipilla ahead of the 2013–14 season, making his first bow in September 2013 against Colo-Colo B. He left at the end of the season after making eighteen appearances. In the next two Primera B seasons, López joined Lota Schwager in 2014 and Coquimbo Unido in 2015. A total of sixteen appearances came in total for Lota and Coquimbo. In August 2017, López joined third tier Deportes Vallenar. His debut for Deportes Vallenar came against Deportes Pintana in early September. He left a year after joining.

On 30 June 2017, López rejoined former club Deportes Melipilla. He departed at the end of 2017 after only one appearance, versus Deportes Naval on 8 December.

== Career statistics ==
As of 31 January 2018.

Club statistics
Club	Season	League			Cup (Note: Includes the Copa Chile)		League Cup		Continental		Other		Total	
Club	Season	Division	Apps	Goals	Apps	Goals	Apps	Goals	Apps	Goals	Apps	Goals	Apps	Goals
Trasandino	2012	Tercera División	0	0	0	0	—		—		0	0	0	0
Unión San Felipe B	2012	Segunda División	12	2	0	0	—		—		0	0	12	2
Unión San Felipe	2012	Primera División	3	0	1	0	—		—		0	0	4	0
Unión San Felipe	2013	Primera B	7	0	0	0	—		—		0	0	7	0
Unión San Felipe	Total		10	0	1	0	—		—		0	0	11	0
Deportes Melipilla	2013–14	Segunda División	18	0	0	0	—		—		0	0	18	0
Lota Schwager	2014–15	Primera B	6	0	6	0	—		—		0	0	12	0
Coquimbo Unido	2015–16	Primera B	10	0	3	0	—		—		0	0	13	0
Deportes Vallenar	2016–17	Segunda División	28	0	0	0	—		—		0	0	28	0
Deportes Melipilla	2017	Segunda División	1	0	0	0	—		—		0	0	1	0
Career total			85	2	10	0	—		—		0	0	95	2
