= John Salas (footballer) =

Chilean footballer (born 1996)

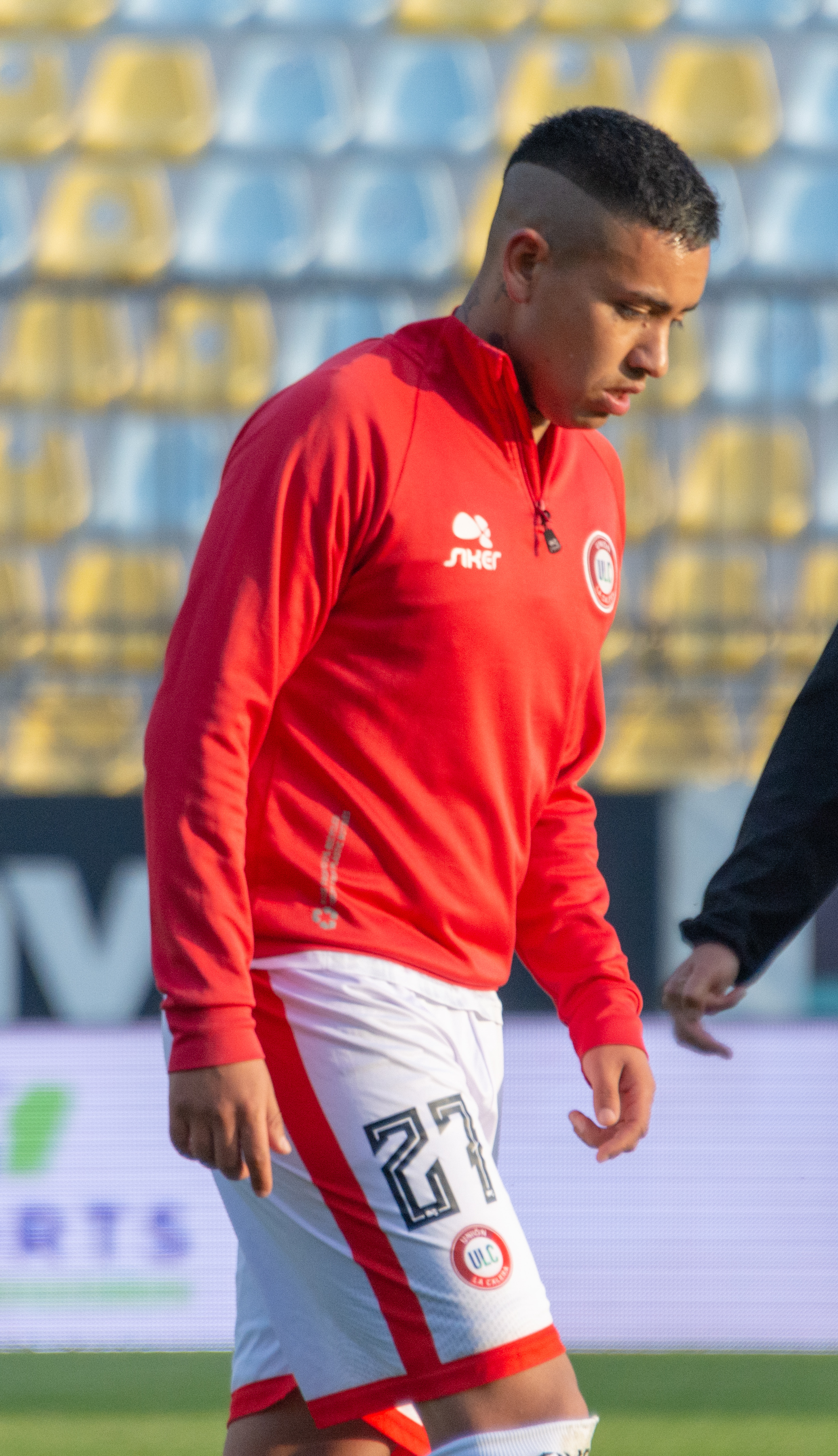
- Salas with Unión La Calera in 2023

Personal information
- Full name: John Michael Salas Torres
- Date of birth: October 12, 1996 (age 30)
- Place of birth: Talcahuano, Chile
- Height: 1.73 m (5 ft 8 in)
- Position: Full-back

Youth career
- Naval
- 2014–2015: → Universidad de Chile (loan)

Senior career*
Years	Team	Apps	(Gls)
2015–2019	Universidad de Chile	0	(0)
2017	→ Deportes Santa Cruz (loan)	15	(1)
2018	→ Iberia (loan)	13	(0)
2019	→ Coquimbo Unido (loan)	22	(0)
2020–2021	Coquimbo Unido	58	(1)
2022	Everton	17	(0)
2023	Unión La Calera	14	(0)
2024	Curicó Unido	14	(0)
2025	Santiago Wanderers	15	(0)
2026	Fernández Vial	3	(0)
- * Club domestic league appearances and goals as of 23 May 2026

John Michael Salas Torres (born October 12, 1996) is a Chilean footballer who plays as full back. He last played for Fernández Vial.

== Career ==
Born in Talcahuano, Chile, Salas was trained at local club, Naval, before joining Universidad de Chile. Shortly after joining them and being promoted to the first team under Martín Lasarte, he suffered a kidney failure. Once he recovered, he played on loan for Segunda División Profesional clubs before being loaned to Primera División club Coquimbo Unido for all 2019 season. After, he signed with Coquimbo Unido as a free agent, taking part in the 2020 Copa Sudamericana.

In 2024, Salas joined Curicó Unido from Unión La Calera. The next season, he switched to Santiago Wanderers.

In 2026, Salas joined Fernández Vial in the Tercera B. He was released on 22 May of the same year.

== Personal life ==
His father, Sergio Salas, is a former football midfielder.

Following playing for Fernández Vial, Salas moved to Antofagasta to work as a typist and serve as coach for a Universidad de Chile academy.

== Honours ==
Universidad de Chile

- Primera División (1): 2017-C

Coquimbo Unido

- Primera B (1): 2021
