= Erwin Durán =

Chilean footballer and manager (born 1977)

Personal information
- Full name: Erwin Manuel Durán Santander
- Date of birth: 14 October 1970 (age 56)
- Place of birth: Concepción, Chile
- Position: Midfielder

Team information
- Current team: Deportes Copiapó (manager)

Senior career*
Years	Team	Apps	(Gls)
1987–1990	Naval		
1991–1994	Everton Viña del Mar		
1995	Santiago Morning		
1996–1997	San Luis		

Managerial career
- 2011: Magallanes (youth)
- 2012: Naval (youth)
- 2013: Fernández Vial
- 2014: Naval
- 2014–2017: Deportes Puerto Montt
- 2017–2018: Deportes Copiapó
- 2018: Deportes Limache
- 2019: Fernández Vial
- 2020: Unión San Felipe
- 2021–2022: Deportes Copiapó
- 2022–2023: Deportes Puerto Montt
- 2024–2025: Deportes La Serena
- 2025–2026: Rangers de Talca
- 2026–: Deportes Copiapó
- * Club domestic league appearances and goals

Erwin Manuel Durán Santander (born 17 October 1970) is a Chilean football manager and former player who played as a midfielder. He is the current manager of Deportes Copiapó.

== Career ==
Born in Concepción, Durán represented Naval de Talcahuano, Everton de Viña del Mar, Santiago Morning and San Luis de Quillota as a player. He retired with the latter in 1997, aged 27.

After retiring, Durán worked as a coach in the football school of San Joaquín, before joining the youth sides of Magallanes in 2011, as a manager of the under-16 squad. In the following year, he led Naval's under-17 and under-19 teams, before being named manager of Fernández Vial on 20 December 2012.

Durán won the 2013 Tercera A with Fernández Vial, before returning to Naval in February 2014, now as first team manager. He left the club after suffering administrative relegation, and was named at the helm of Deportes Puerto Montt in August.

Durán led Puerto Montt to the Primera B after winning the Segunda División Profesional de Chile in 2015, but left the club in May 2017 after not renewing his contract. He was named Deportes Copiapó manager shortly after, but was dismissed from the latter in September 2018.

In October 2018, Durán took over Deportes Limache, but left after missing out promotion. He returned to Fernández Vial on 29 December of that year, but was replaced by Jorge Garcés in August 2019.

On 10 December 2019, Durán was announced as manager of Unión San Felipe for the upcoming season. Sacked on 20 November 2020, he returned to Copiapó the following 5 February.

Durán led Copiapó to the finals of the 2021 Primera B, but resigned on 4 January 2022 amidst the uncertainty of a promotion. Two days later, he returned to Puerto Montt, being dismissed on 15 July 2023.

On 16 January 2024, Durán was named Deportes La Serena manager. He led the club to a top tier promotion as champions.

In the second half of 2025, Durán was appointed as the manager of Rangers de Talca. He left them in March 2026.

== Honours ==
Fernández Vial

- Tercera A: 2013

Deportes Puerto Montt

- Segunda División Profesional de Chile: 2014–15

Deportes La Serena

- Primera B de Chile: 2024
