= Nozomi Kimura =

Chilean footballer (born 1997)

Personal information
- Full name: Nozomi Seijiro Kimura Heredia
- Date of birth: 23 January 1997 (age 29)
- Place of birth: Santiago, Chile
- Height: 1.78 m (5 ft 10 in)
- Position: Centre back

Team information
- Current team: Deportes Copiapó (on loan from Deportes Concepción)

Youth career
- Santiago Morning

Senior career*
Years	Team	Apps	(Gls)
2014–2021	Santiago Morning	99	(3)
2017	→ O'Higgins (loan)	11	(0)
2019	→ Cobreloa (loan)	16	(0)
2020	→ Ñublense (loan)	21	(0)
2022–2023	Ñublense	7	(0)
2023–2024	Fernández Vial	30	(0)
2025	Brujas de Salamanca	11	(0)
2025–	Deportes Concepción	12	(0)
2026–	→ Deportes Copiapó (loan)	0	(0)

International career
2017	Chile U20	1	(0)
- * Club domestic league appearances and goals as of 9 January 2026

Nozomi Seijiro Kimura Heredia (Japanese: 木村 のぞみ Kimura Nozomi, born 23 January 1997) is a Chilean footballer who plays as a centre-back for Deportes Copiapó on loan from Deportes Concepción.

== Club career ==
In 2014, at the age of 17, he was promoted to Santiago Morning’s first-adult team. Since that year he has played as starter during three years at the Primera B (second-tier).

In August 2025, Kimura joined Deportes Concepción from Brujas de Salamanca. The next year, he moved on loan to Deportes Copiapó.

== International career ==
In 2017, he was called up to under-20 national team by coach Héctor Robles to face the South American Youth Championship at Ecuador. He made his debut one day after his 20th birthday, on 24 January, against Paraguay.

== Personal life ==
His paternal great-grandfather Seijiro was the first of his family to arrive in Chile from Japan, first to Talcahuano and then settling at Santiago where Nozomi's grandfather José Guillermo and his father José Luis were born.

In November 2016, Kimura starred in Somos Chile (We are Chile), a web series created by the ANFP which reflects the process of multiculturalism that Chile has been going through that decade, in hopes to combat forms of discrimination such as racism and xenophobia. In the series, Kimura revealed that he was sometimes bullied by his teammates due to his Japanese name.
