= Rubén Sánchez =

Rubén Sánchez may refer to:

- Rubén Sánchez (journalist) (born 1963), Puerto Rican journalist
- Rubén Sánchez León (born 1973), Mexican boxer
- Rubén Sánchez (footballer, born 1987), Spanish footballer
- Rubén Sánchez (footballer, born 1989), Spanish football winger for Huracán Balazote
- Rubén Sánchez (footballer, born 1994), Spanish football forward for Rayo Majadahonda
- Rubén Sánchez (footballer, born 2001), Spanish football right-back for Espanyol
- Rubén Sánchez (artist), Spanish artist
- Rubén Sánchez (cyclist), Spanish cyclist

== See also ==
- Frédéric Bourdin (born 1974), French imposter who used the identity Ruben Sanchez Espinoza
