= Diego Opazo =

Chilean footballer (born 1991)

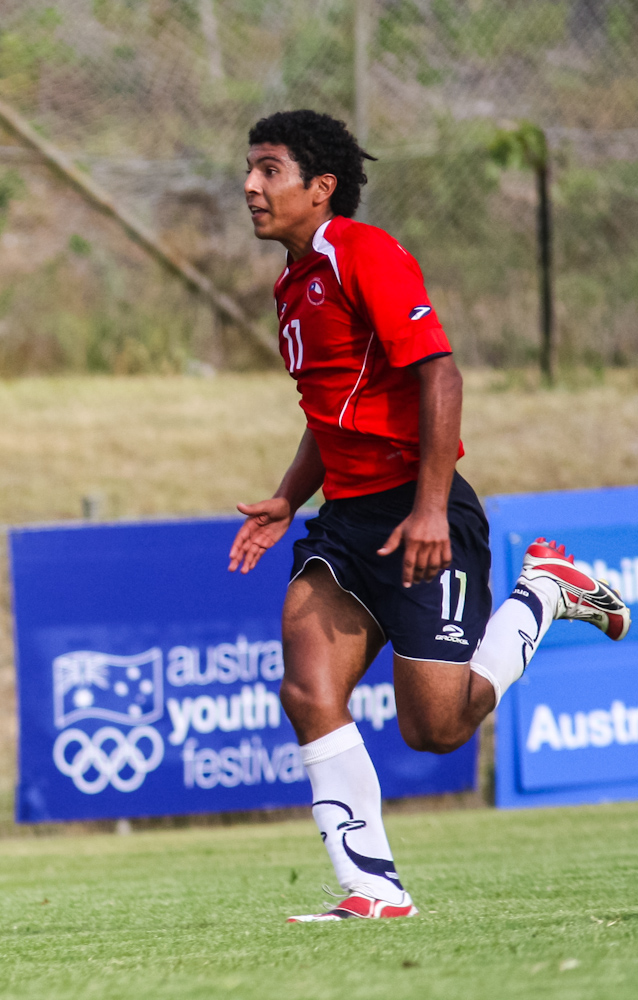
- Opazo with Chile U18 in 2009

Personal information
- Full name: Diego Alexi Opazo González
- Date of birth: February 2, 1991 (age 35)
- Place of birth: Santiago, Chile
- Height: 1.78 m (5 ft 10 in)
- Position: Defender

Team information
- Current team: Deportes Copiapó
- Number: 13

Youth career
- 2000–2010: Universidad Católica

Senior career*
Years	Team	Apps	(Gls)
2011–2016	Universidad Católica	13	(0)
2012	→ Deportes Concepción (loan)	36	(3)
2013	→ San Marcos (loan)	12	(0)
2014	→ Lota Schwager (loan)	17	(0)
2014–2015	→ Curicó Unido (loan)	22	(0)
2015–2016	→ Rangers (loan)	8	(0)
2016–2017	Deportes Santa Cruz	32	(1)
2017	Iberia	11	(4)
2018	Ñublense	18	(0)
2019	Deportes La Serena	20	(0)
2020–2022	Deportes Puerto Montt	85	(3)
2023–2024	Santiago Morning	54	(2)
2025–	Deportes Copiapó	18	(0)

International career
2008	Chile U17	1	(0)
2009	Chile U18		
- * Club domestic league appearances and goals as of 19 January 2026

Diego Alexi Opazo González (born 2 February 1991) is a Chilean footballer who plays as centre-back for Primera B de Chile club Deportes Copiapó.

== Honours ==
Universidad Católica

- Copa Chile: 2011
