= Bruno Liuzzi =

Argentine-Chilean footballer (born 2000)

Personal information
- Full name: Bruno Enzo Liuzzi
- Date of birth: 30 August 2000 (age 26)
- Place of birth: Venado Tuerto, Santa Fe, Argentina
- Height: 1.78 m (5 ft 10 in)
- Position: Midfielder

Team information
- Current team: Magallanes
- Number: 5

Youth career
- Jorge Newbery CR
- 2016–2020: Sarmiento de Junín

Senior career*
Years	Team	Apps	(Gls)
2020–2025	Sarmiento de Junín	1	(0)
2021	→ Unión La Calera (loan)	8	(1)
2022	→ Gimnasia de Mendoza (loan)	8	(0)
2023–2024	→ Deportes Antofagasta (loan)	21	(1)
2025	Concón National	12	(0)
2026–	Magallanes	0	(0)
- * Club domestic league appearances and goals as of 7 January 2026

Bruno Enzo Liuzzi (born 30 August 2000) is an Argentine-Chilean footballer who plays as a midfielder for Chilean side Magallanes.

== Career ==
A product of both Club Atlético Jorge Newbery and Sarmiento de Junín, Liuzzi has played on loan at Chilean side Unión La Calera in the top division (2021) and Gimnasia y Esgrima de Mendoza in the Argentine second level (2022).

Previously, he took part of Sarmiento squad in the 2020 Primera Nacional, when the club got the league title.

In 2023, after training with Chilean side Deportes Copiapó, even making appearances in friendly matches, Liuzzi joined Deportes Antofagasta in the Chilean second level.

On 13 July 2025, Liuzzi signed with Concón National in the Segunda División Profesional de Chile.

In January 2026, Liuzzi signed with Magallanes.

== Personal life ==
Liuzzi holds dual Argentine-Chilean nationality, since his mother is Chilean.

== Career statistics ==
As of 17 August 2023.

Club statistics
Club	Division	League			Cup		Continental		Total	
Club	Division	Season	Apps	Goals	Apps	Goals	Apps	Goals	Apps	Goals
Unión La Calera	Chilean Primera División	2021	8	1	2	0	4	0	14	1
Gimnasia de Mendoza	Primera Nacional	2022	8	0	0	0	—		8	0
Deportes Copiapó	Chilean Primera División	2023	0	0	0	0	—		0	0
Deportes Antofagasta	Primera B de Chile	2023	17	0	0	0	—		17	0
Deportes Antofagasta	Primera B de Chile	2024	4	0	0	0	—		4	0
Deportes Antofagasta	Total		21	0	0	0	0	0	21	0
Career total			37	1	2	0	4	0	43	1

== Honours ==
Sarmiento

- Primera Nacional: 2020
