= Wilson Contreras =

Chilean footballer (born 1967)

Personal information
- Full name: Wilson Enrique Contreras Trujillo
- Date of birth: 5 October 1967 (age 59)
- Place of birth: Vallenar, Chile
- Height: 1.78 m (5 ft 10 in)
- Position: Midfielder

Senior career*
Years	Team	Apps	(Gls)
1990–1994	Regional Atacama		
1995–1997	Huachipato		
1998–1999	Colo-Colo		
2000–2001	Coquimbo Unido		
2002–2003	Deportes La Serena		

International career
1994-1997	Chile	4	(0)

Managerial career
- 2014: Deportes Vallenar
- 2023: Deportes Vallenar
- * Club domestic league appearances and goals

Wilson Enrique Contreras Trujillo (born 5 October 1967) is a Chilean former footballer who played for clubs like Colo-Colo, Huachipato or Deportes La Serena.

== Career ==
He played as a midfielder.

Contreras managed Deportes Vallenar in 2014.

== In politics ==
Contreras was a candidate to councillor for Vallenar commune in 2012 as a member of Broad Social Movement (MAS).

== Honours ==
=== Player ===
Colo-Colo

- Primera División de Chile (1): 1998
