= Manuel López (Argentine footballer) =

Argentine footballer

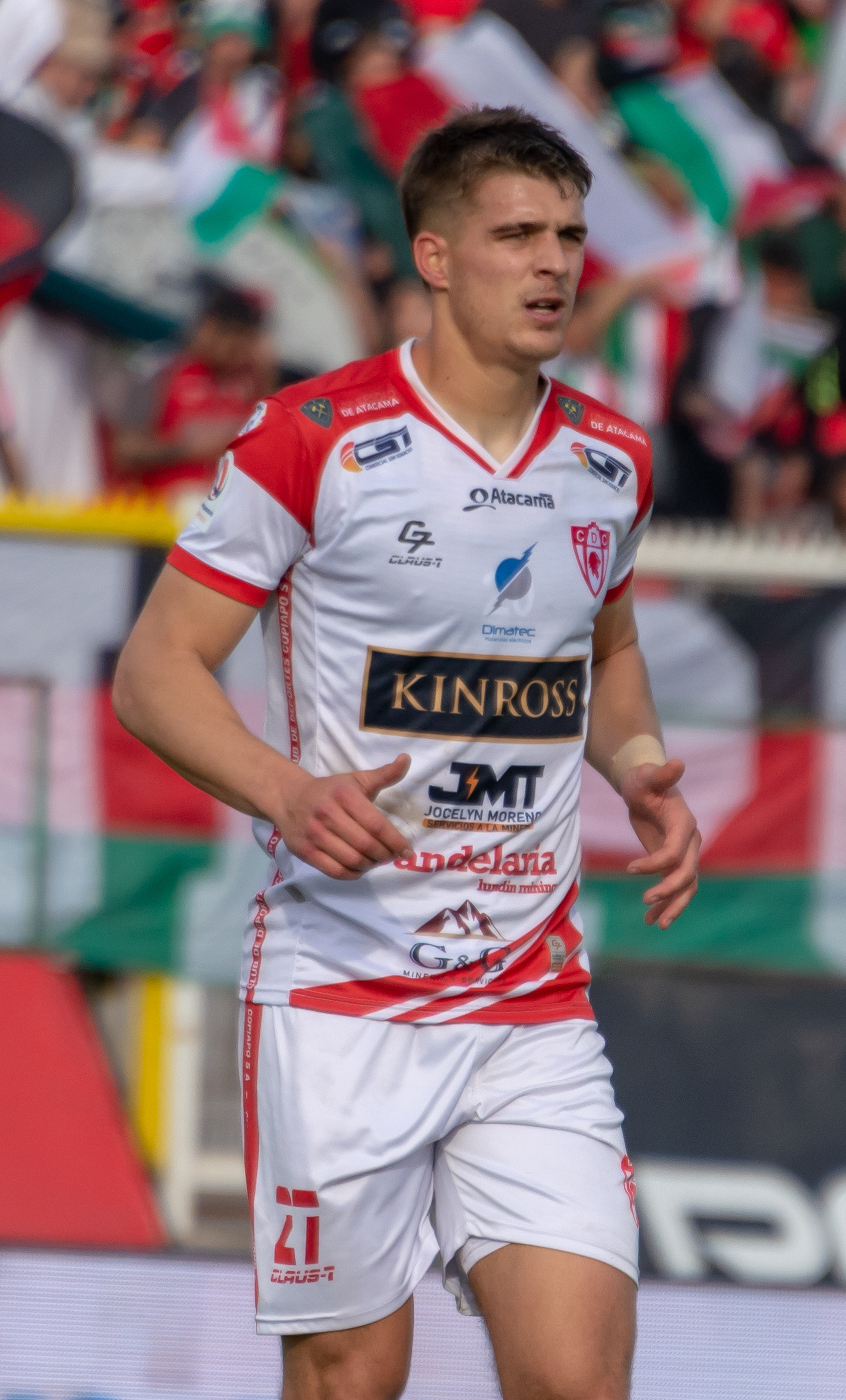
- López with Deportes Copiapó in 2023

Personal information
- Date of birth: 30 November 1995 (age 30)
- Place of birth: Buenos Aires, Argentina
- Height: 1.92 m (6 ft 4 in)
- Position: Forward

Team information
- Current team: Deportes Copiapó
- Number: 31

Youth career
- Aristóbulo del Valle
- Colegiales

Senior career*
| Years | Team | Apps | (Gls) |
| 2013–2018 | Colegiales | 64 | (11) |
| 2018–2019 | UAI Urquiza | 22 | (2) |
| 2019 | Flandria | 17 | (11) |
| 2020–2025 | Deportes Antofagasta | 29 | (3) |
| 2020–2021 | → Rangers (loan) | 31 | (11) |
| 2021 | → Lautaro de Buin (loan) | – | (–) |
| 2021 | → Deportes Copiapó (loan) | 21 | (21) |
| 2023 | → Deportes Copiapó (loan) | 26 | (5) |
| 2024 | → Ferro Carril Oeste (loan) | 13 | (0) |
| 2025– | Deportes Copiapó | 14 | (2) |
- * Club domestic league appearances and goals as of 18 January 2026

Manuel López (born 30 November 1995) is an Argentine professional footballer who plays as a forward for Chilean club Deportes Copiapó.

== Career ==
As a child, Lopéz was with the club Aristóbulo del Valle from Vicente López, Buenos Aires until he joined Colegiales, making his professional debut in 2013 at the age of 17 in the Primera División B. He stayed with Colegiales until 2018, with a brief test step in Turkey, playing after for UAI Urquiza and Flandria in the same division.

In 2020, he moved to Chile and signed with Deportes Antofagasta, being loaned to Rangers de Talca in the Primera B. On first half 2021, he was loaned to Lautaro de Buin, but the team couldn't play in any division due to regulation issues. On second half 2021, he joined Deportes Copiapó, becoming the top goalscorer of the 2021 Primera B.

In 2022, López returned to Deportes Antofagasta, taking part in the 2022 Copa Sudamericana and scoring the goal for the first win of his team against a foreign team in the match against Atlético Goianiense. He was loaned out to Deportes Copiapó and Ferro Carril Oeste in 2023 and 2024, respectively.

In July 2025, López returned to Deportes Copiapó from Deportes Antofagasta.

== Personal life ==
Manuel is the older brother of the footballer Tomas Lopez Petruzzi.

== Honours ==
Individual

- Primera B de Chile Top Goalscorer: 2021
