= Nelson Cossio =

Chilean footballer (born 1966)

Personal information
- Full name: Nelson Orlando Cossio Riquelme
- Date of birth: 14 June 1966 (age 60)
- Place of birth: Santiago, Chile
- Height: 1.83 m (6 ft 0 in)
- Position: Goalkeeper

Senior career*
Years	Team	Apps	(Gls)
1983–1992	Palestino		
1987	→ Soinca Bata (loan)		
1988	→ Deportes Antofagasta (loan)		
1989–1990	→ Soinca Bata (loan)		
1993	Everton		
1994–1996	Universidad de Chile		
1996–1997	Audax Italiano		
1998	Deportes Temuco		
1999	Deportes Iquique		
2000	Deportes Concepción		
2001	Unión Española		
2001	Deportes Arica		
2002	Universidad Católica		

International career
1997	Chile	4	(0)

Managerial career
- 2003–2004: Naval
- 2005: O'Higgins
- 2006–2008: Deportes Copiapó
- 2008: Coquimbo Unido
- 2009: Deportes Copiapó
- 2010: Naval
- 2010: Deportes Copiapó
- 2011: Unión San Felipe
- 2011: San Luis
- 2011–2012: Unión San Felipe
- 2012–2013: Lota Schwager
- 2013–2014: Deportes Melipilla
- 2014: San Luis
- 2014: Lota Schwager
- 2014–2016: Deportes Melipilla
- 2016: Deportes Vallenar
- 2017: Provincial Osorno
- 2018: San Bernardo Unido
- 2019: Aguará
- 2023-: Adriana Cousiño
- * Club domestic league appearances and goals

Nelson Orlando Cossio Riquelme (born 1966-06-14) is a retired football goalkeeper from Chile, who made his debut for the Chile national football team on 1997-01-04 in a friendly against Armenia. He obtained a total number of four caps during his professional career.

== Honours ==
=== Club ===
Universidad de Chile

- Primera División de Chile (2): 1994, 1995
