= Francisco Michea =

Chilean footballer and coach (born 1978)

Personal information
- Full name: Francisco Javier Michea Michea
- Date of birth: 24 December 1978 (age 47)
- Place of birth: Combarbalá, Chile
- Height: 1.70 m (5 ft 7 in)
- Position: Midfielder

Senior career*
Years	Team	Apps	(Gls)
1996–1998	Regional Atacama		
1999–2000	Deportes Copiapó	–	(–)
2001–2003	Deportes Ovalle		
2004	Naval		
2005	O'Higgins	7	(0)
2006–2007	Deportes Copiapó	64	(5)
2008	Coquimbo Unido	37	(0)
2009–2011	Deportes Copiapó	53	(5)

Managerial career
- Deportes Copiapó (youth)
- 2016: Deportes Copiapó (interim)
- 2016–2017: Deportes Vallenar
- 2019: CEFF Copiapó
- 2020–2021: Curacaví FC
- * Club domestic league appearances and goals

Francisco Javier Michea Michea (born 24 December 1978) is a Chilean football coach and former player who played as a midfielder.

== Career ==
A product of Regional Atacama, Michea is strongly related with Deportes Copiapó, the team founded after Regional Atacama dissolved in 1998. He played for them in three stints. He also played for Deportes Ovalle, Naval, O'Higgins and Coquimbo Unido.

As a football coach, he began his career at the Deportes Copiapó youth ranks. He assumed as the interim coach in May 2016 after the head coach, Rubén Sánchez, suffered a heart attack. In October of the same year, he signed with Deportes Vallenar in the Segunda División Profesional.

He has also led teams at minor categories of the Chilean football such as CEFF Copiapó and Curacaví FC.
