= Axl Ríos =

Chilean footballer

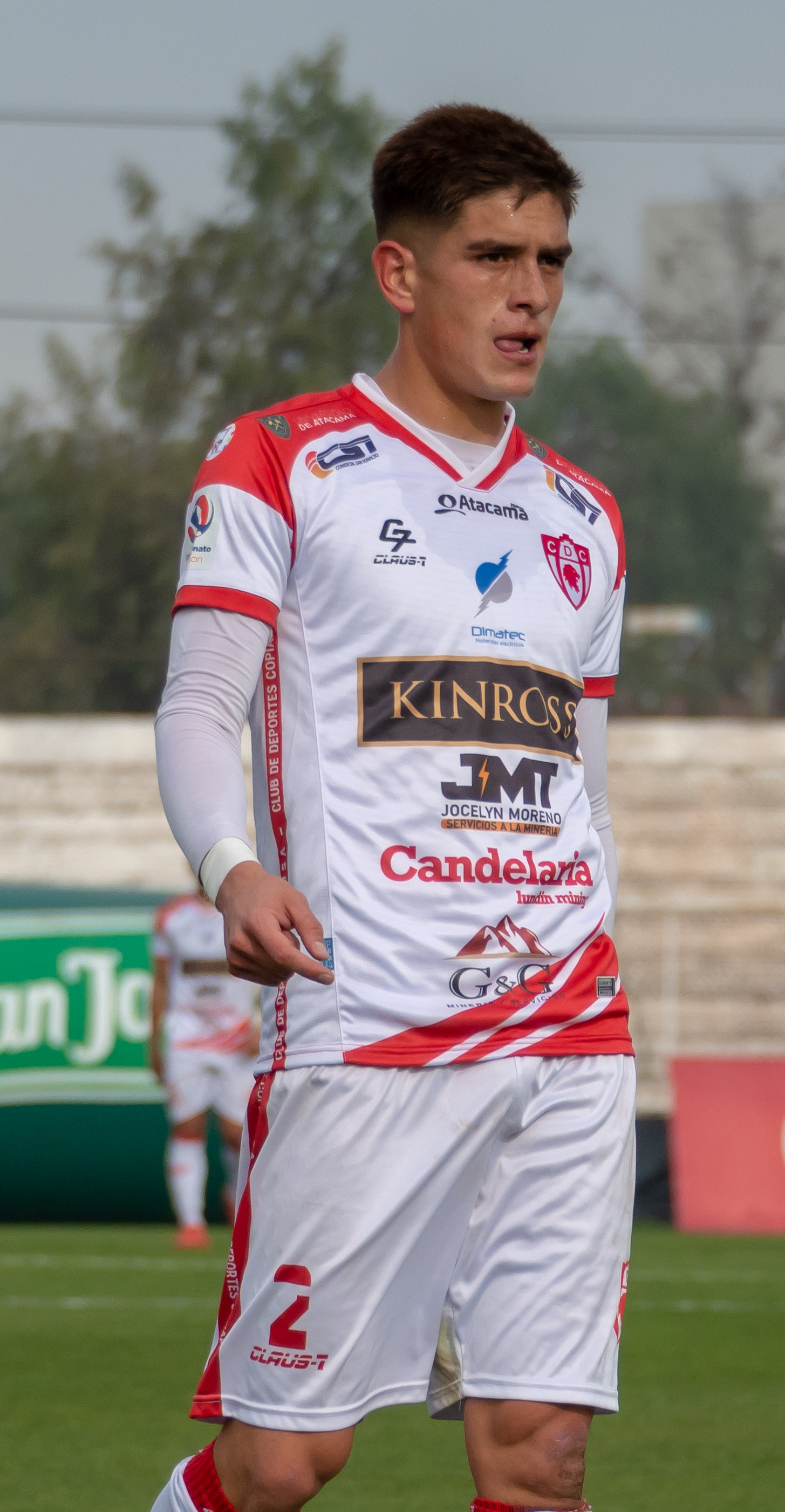
- Ríos with Deportes Copiapó in 2023.

Personal information
- Full name: Axl Franchesco Antoninno Ríos Urrejola
- Date of birth: 11 July 1999 (age 27)
- Place of birth: Talagante, Chile
- Height: 1.78 m (5 ft 10 in)
- Position: Midfielder

Team information
- Current team: Deportes Copiapó

Youth career
- Cobreloa

Senior career*
Years	Team	Apps	(Gls)
2017–2022	Cobreloa	109	(8)
2023	Deportes Copiapó	14	(0)
2024–2025	Everton	5	(0)
2025	→ Deportes Copiapó (loan)	27	(3)
2026–	Deportes Copiapó	0	(0)

International career
2018–2019	Chile U20	6	(0)
- * Club domestic league appearances and goals as of 18 January 2026

Axl Franchesco Antoninno Ríos Urrejola (born 11 July 1999) is a Chilean professional footballer who plays as a midfielder for Deportes Copiapó.

== Club career ==
Ríos is a product of Cobreloa and made his professional debut in 2017. In subsequent seasons, he became a regular member of the first team until he left the club at the end of the 2022 season.

In January 2023, Ríos signed with Deportes Copiapó for the 2023 Chilean Primera División.

In January 2024, Ríos joined Everton de Viña del Mar. For the 2025 season, he returned to Deportes Copiapó on loan for one year. Back to Everton, he ended his contract at the end of 2025.

=== Controversies ===
In August 2023, Ríos was named in a match fixing allegation made by former teammate David Escalante in Cobreloa in the context of the promotion playoff final match against Deportes Copiapó, in which Ríos received a red card.

== International career ==
Ríos represented Chile at under-20 level in the 2019 South American Championship, making an appearance in the 0–1 loss against Colombia.
