= Ramón Climent (footballer, born 1963) =

Chilean football manager and player

Personal information
- Full name: Ramón Arturo Climent Labra
- Date of birth: 23 December 1963 (age 62)
- Place of birth: Santiago, Chile
- Position: Midfielder

Team information
- Current team: Trasandino (manager)

Youth career
- Universidad de Chile

Senior career*
Years	Team	Apps	(Gls)
1981	Universidad de Chile	0	(0)
1981	→ Curicó Unido (loan)	–	(–)
1982–1983	Regional Atacama	57	(1)
1984	Audax Italiano	8	(0)
1985–1986	Deportes Concepción	55	(5)
1987	Unión Española	15	(0)
1988–1989	O'Higgins	46	(2)
1990–1993	Everton	59	(1)
1994	Ñublense	14	(0)
1995–1996	Marconi Stallions	7	(0)
Total		261	(9)

Managerial career
- 2002–2003: Unión Quilpué
- 2004–2006: Municipal Limache
- 2011: Deportes Quilicura
- 2012: Deportes Ovalle
- 2013: Estrella del Huasco
- 2015: Municipal Mejillones
- 2015: Deportes Vallenar
- 2016: Fernández Vial
- 2017–2018: Deportes Vallenar
- 2018: Provincial Ovalle
- 2019: Deportes Limache
- 2020–2021: Deportes Linares
- 2022: Unión Compañías
- 2023: Deportes Vallenar
- 2024–: Trasandino
- * Club domestic league appearances and goals

Ramón Arturo Climent Labra (born 23 December 1963) is a Chilean football manager and former player who played as a midfielder. He is currently in charge of Trasandino.

== Playing career ==
A football midfielder from the Universidad de Chile youth system, Climent made his debut on loan with Curicó Unido in the third level of the Chilean football.

He mainly developed his career at the Chilean top division, playing for Regional Atacama, Audax Italiano, Deportes Concepción, Unión Española, O'Higgins and Everton.

In the second division, he played for Ñublense in 1994.

Abroad, he had stints with Marconi Stallions in the Australian National Soccer League and the Japanese football.

== Coaching career ==
As a football manager, he has mainly developed his career at minor categories of the Chilean football, beginning with Unión Quilpué in 2002. A historical manager of Deportes Vallenar, he led them in their first season in 2013, then called Estrella del Huasco, becoming the runner-up in the 2013 Clausura of Tercera B and getting the promotion to the Tercera A. Later, he got the promotion to the Segunda División Profesional from the Tercera A in 2015 and won the 2017 Transición.

He also has coached clubs such as Deportes Ovalle, Municipal Mejillones, Fernández Vial, Deportes Limache, Deportes Linares, among others.

In May 2023, he returned to Deportes Vallenar.

== Personal life ==
Climent is the son of the Chile international footballer and manager Ramón Climent Morales (1929–2003).

His paternal grandfather was Spanish and served as a football leader for clubs in Quinta Normal and his uncle also played football at amateur level in the same commune.
