= Gonzalo Álvarez =

Chilean footballer (born 1997)

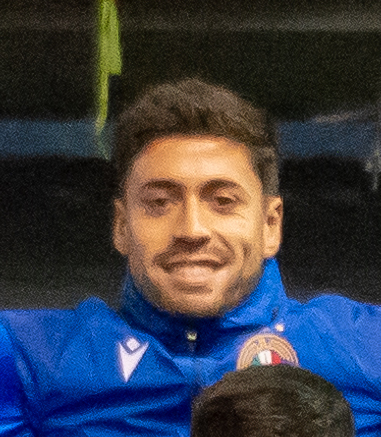
- Álvarez with Audax Italiano in 2023

Personal information
- Full name: Gonzalo Esteban Álvarez Morales
- Date of birth: 20 January 1997 (age 29)
- Place of birth: San Felipe, Chile
- Height: 1.70 m (5 ft 7 in)
- Position: Winger

Team information
- Current team: Deportes Recoleta

Youth career
- Escuela Luis Quesada
- Real Madrid Academy
- Unión San Felipe

Senior career*
Years	Team	Apps	(Gls)
2014–2021	Unión San Felipe	35	(11)
2018	→ San Antonio Unido (loan)	24	(1)
2020–2021	→ Audax Italiano (loan)	36	(8)
2022–2024	Audax Italiano	62	(5)
2025	Deportes Limache	3	(0)
2025	Rangers	13	(0)
2026–	Deportes Recoleta	0	(0)
- * Club domestic league appearances and goals as of 23 December 2025

Gonzalo Esteban Álvarez Morales (born 20 January 1997), nicknamed El Gringo, is a Chilean professional footballer who plays as a winger for Deportes Recoleta.

== Career ==
Álvarez joined Unión San Felipe at U16 level, making his professional debut in a Primera B match against Naval on May 14, 2014.

In the second half of 2020 Chilean Primera División, Álvarez joined Audax Italiano on loan from Unión San Felipe with an option to buy, making his debut at the Chilean top flight scoring a goal against Coquimbo Unido.

In 2025, Álvarez signed with Deportes Limache. He switched to Rangers de Talca for the second half of the same year.

In December 2025, Álvarez joined Deportes Recoleta.

== Personal life ==
Born in San Felipe, Chile, Álvarez moved to Miami along with his family at the age of 7 and returned to Chile at the age of 13. Due to the fact that he lived in the United States, he has been nicknamed El Gringo.

== Career statistics ==
=== Club ===
As of 25 March 2021

Club	Season	League			Cup		Continental		Other		Total	
Club	Season	Division	Apps	Goals	Apps	Goals	Apps	Goals	Apps	Goals	Apps	Goals
Unión San Felipe	2013–14	Primera B	1	0	0	0	—		0	0	1	0
Unión San Felipe	2014–15	Primera B	1	0	0	0	—		0	0	1	0
Unión San Felipe	2015–16	Primera B	0	0	1	0	—		0	0	1	0
Unión San Felipe	2016–17	Primera B	2	0	0	0	—		0	0	2	0
Unión San Felipe	2017–T	Primera B	3	0	5	0	—		0	0	8	0
Unión San Felipe	2019	Primera B	12	4	4	0	—		0	0	16	4
Unión San Felipe	2020	Primera B	16	7	—		—		0	0	16	7
Unión San Felipe	Total		35	11	10 (Note: Appearances in the Copa Chile)	0	—		0	0	45	11
San Antonio Unido (loan)	2018	Segunda; División	24	1	2	0	—		0	0	26	1
Audax Italiano (loan)	2020	Primera; División	13	5	—		—		0	0	13	5
Audax Italiano (loan)	2021	Primera; División	0	0	0	0	—		0	0	0	0
Audax Italiano (loan)	Total		13	5	0	0	—		0	0	13	5
Career total			72	17	12	0	0	0	0	0	84	17
