= Jonathan Chávez =

Argentine footballer (born 1989)

Personal information
- Full name: Jonathan Daniel Chávez
- Date of birth: January 8, 1989 (age 37)
- Place of birth: La Plata, Argentina
- Height: 1.78 m (5 ft 10 in)
- Position: Midfielder

Youth career
- Gimnasia LP

Senior career*
Years	Team	Apps	(Gls)
2006–2009	Gimnasia LP	11	(0)
2009–2011	Defensa y Justicia	44	(7)
2011–2013	Gimnasia LP	26	(2)
2013–2014	Cobreloa	29	(4)
2014–2015	Godoy Cruz	2	(0)
2015–2016	Boca Unidos	32	(0)
2016	Brown de Adrogué	6	(0)
2016–2017	Santamarina	33	(5)
2017–2018	Atlanta	19	(4)
2019	Deportes Vallenar	13	(2)
- * Club domestic league appearances and goals as of 00:31, 16 September 2019 (UTC)

Jonathan Daniel Chávez (born 8 January 1989, in La Plata) is an Argentine football midfielder.
