= Gastón Pérez =

Uruguayan footballer

Personal information
- Full name: Gastón Alejandro Pérez Conde
- Date of birth: 19 October 1999 (age 27)
- Place of birth: San Gregorio de Polanco, Uruguay
- Height: 1.76 m (5 ft 9 in)
- Position: Midfielder

Team information
- Current team: Deportes Copiapó
- Number: 26

Youth career
- Peñarol

Senior career*
Years	Team	Apps	(Gls)
2020–2022	Liverpool Montevideo	52	(2)
2023	Cerro	29	(0)
2024–2025	Boston River	41	(1)
2025	Monagas	10	(0)
2026–	Deportes Copiapó	1	(0)
- * Club domestic league appearances and goals as of 23 February 2026

Gastón Alejandro Pérez Conde (born 19 October 1999) is a Uruguayan professional footballer who plays as a midfielder for Chilean club Deportes Copiapó.

== Club career ==
Born in San Gregorio de Polanco, Uruguay, Pérez is a product of Liverpool Montevideo and made his professional debut in the 1–0 win against Cerro on 23 August 2020 for the Torneo Apertura. With them, he won the 2020 Torneo Clausura, the 2020 Supercopa Uruguaya and the 2022 Torneo Apertura.

In 2020, Pérez moved to Cerro. The next two seasons, he played for Boston River.

In August 2025, Pérez moved abroad and joined Venezuelan club Monagas.

In January 2026, Pérez moved to Chile and joined Deportes Copiapó.
