= John Santander =

Chilean footballer (born 1994)

Personal information
- Full name: John Antonio Santander Plaza
- Date of birth: May 15, 1994 (age 32)
- Place of birth: Combarbalá, Chile
- Height: 1.75 m (5 ft 9 in)
- Position: Left-back

Team information
- Current team: Deportes Copiapó
- Number: 15

Youth career
- Universidad de Chile

Senior career*
Years	Team	Apps	(Gls)
2012–2015	Universidad de Chile	1	(0)
2013	→ Deportes La Serena (loan)	4	(0)
2013–2015	→ Barnechea (loan)	37	(3)
2015–2017	Huachipato	11	(2)
2016–2017	→ San Luis (loan)	13	(1)
2017–2018	Deportes Temuco	14	(0)
2019–2020	Cobresal	21	(0)
2021	Deportes Iquique	23	(1)
2022	Deportes Recoleta	26	(2)
2023	Santiago Wanderers	20	(1)
2024	Santiago Morning	26	(0)
2025–	Deportes Copiapó	29	(1)
- * Club domestic league appearances and goals as of 19 January 2026

John Antonio Santander Plaza (born 15 May 1994) is a Chilean footballer who plays as a left-back for Deportes Copiapó.

== Career ==
He debuted on 9 September 2012 in a match against Santiago Wanderers for the 2012 Copa Chile. He played his first league match on 7 October in a match against Antofagasta

In 2024, he signed with Santiago Morning.
