= Claudio Zamorano =

Chilean footballer (born 1998)

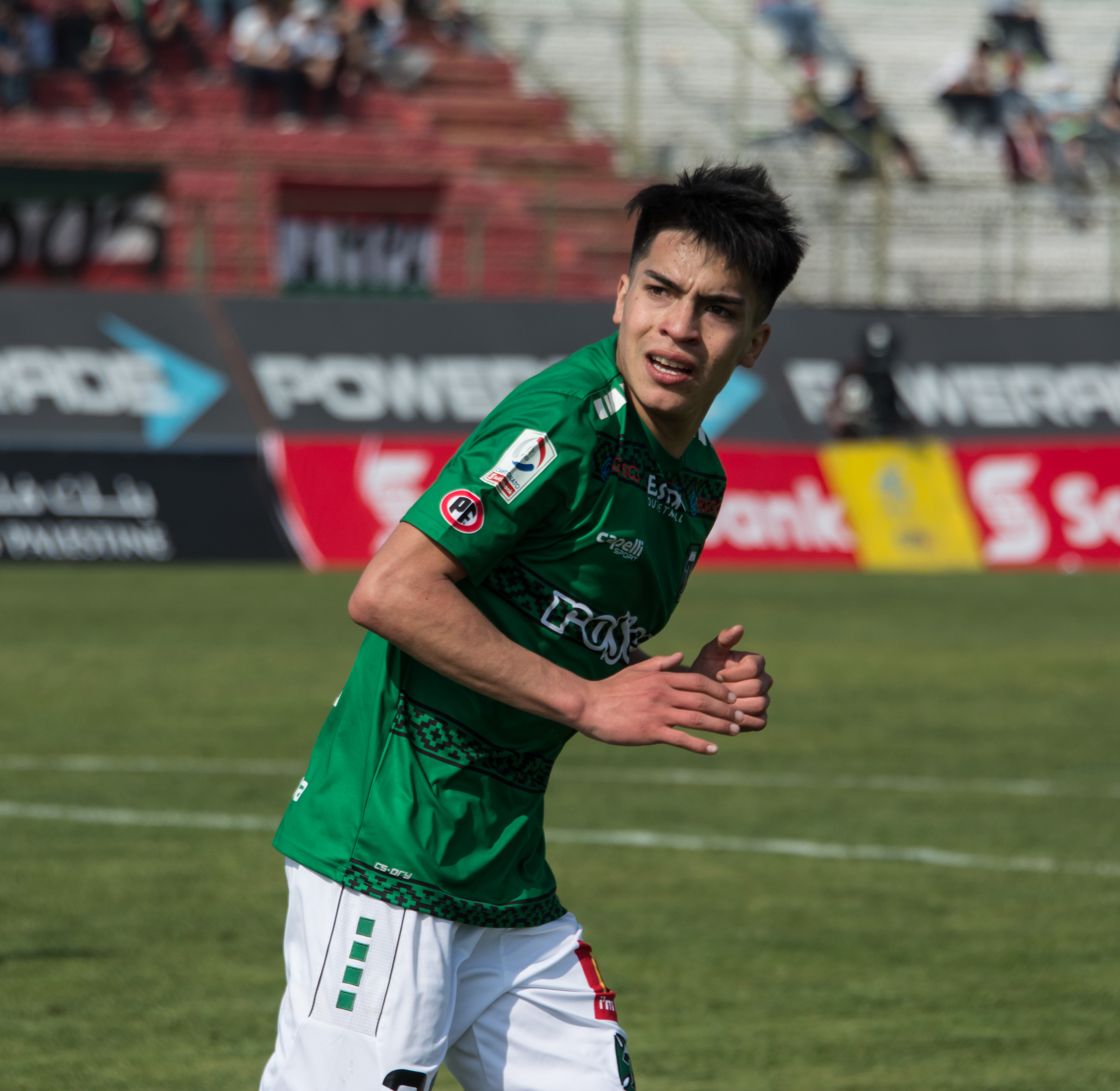
- Zamorano with Deportes Temuco in 2018

Personal information
- Full name: Claudio Ignacio Zamorano Salamanca
- Date of birth: 25 August 1998 (age 28)
- Place of birth: El Salvador, Chile
- Height: 1.75 m (5 ft 9 in)
- Position: Midfielder

Team information
- Current team: Deportes Copiapó
- Number: 6

Youth career
- Deportes Temuco

Senior career*
Years	Team	Apps	(Gls)
2017–2023	Deportes Temuco	125	(1)
2024	Magallanes	27	(1)
2025–	Deportes Copiapó	16	(0)
- * Club domestic league appearances and goals as of 10 January 2026

Claudio Ignacio Zamorano Salamanca (born 25 August 1998) is a Chilean footballer who plays as a midfielder for Deportes Copiapó.

== Career ==
In 2024, he joined Magallanes.
