= Francisco Alarcón (footballer) =

Chilean footballer (born 1990)

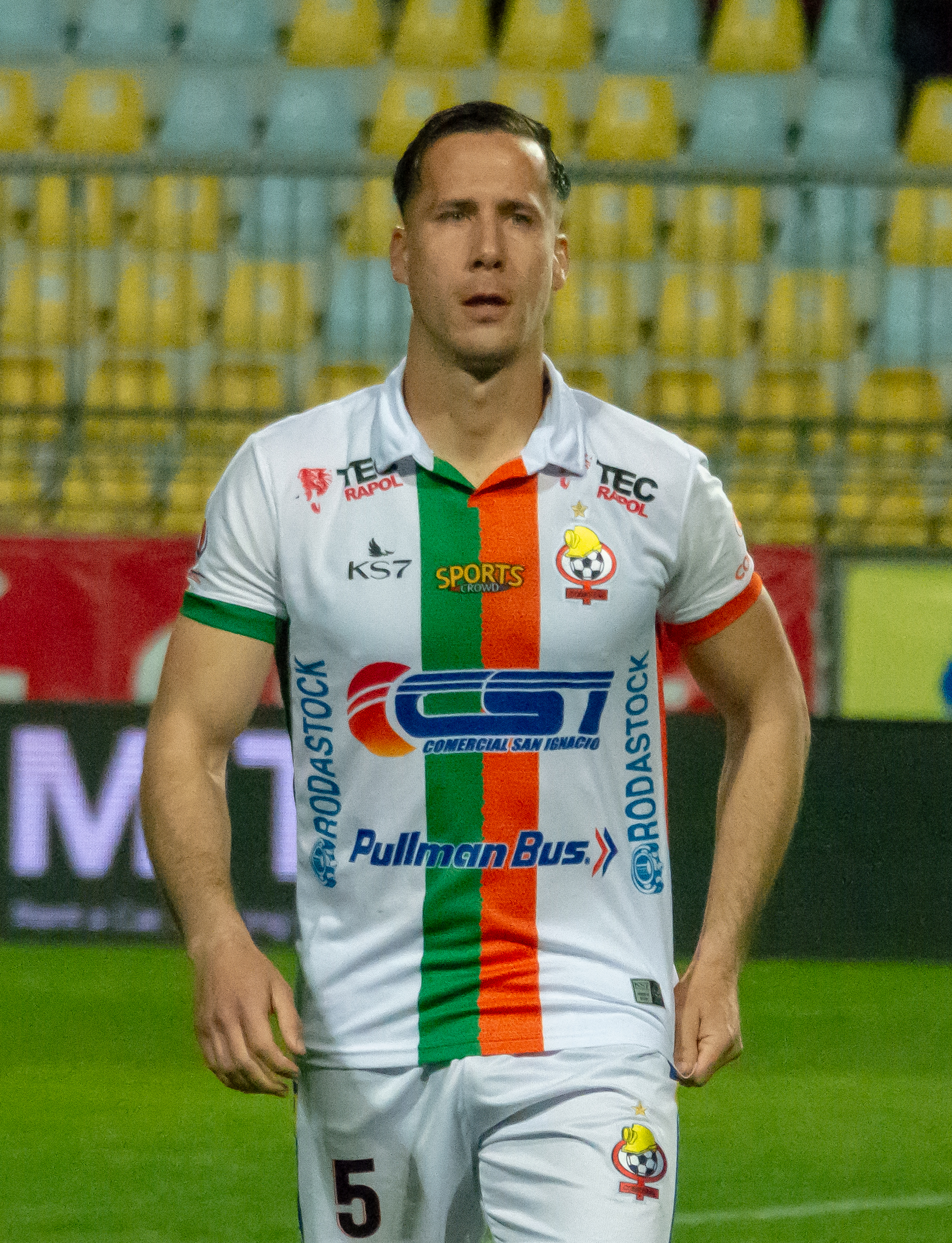
- Alarcón with Cobresal in 2023.

Personal information
- Full name: Francisco Arturo Alarcón Cruz
- Date of birth: 25 February 1990 (age 36)
- Place of birth: Santiago, Chile
- Height: 1.89 m (6 ft 2 in)
- Position: Centre back

Team information
- Current team: Deportes Recoleta

Youth career
- 2004–2009: Unión Española

Senior career*
Years	Team	Apps	(Gls)
2010–2014	Unión Española	22	(0)
2012	Unión Española B	9	(2)
2012–2013	→ San Martín SJ (loan)	12	(1)
2013	→ Everton (loan)	16	(0)
2014	→ Rangers (loan)	12	(2)
2014–2015	Deportes Antofagasta	23	(1)
2015–2016	Palestino	15	(1)
2016–2017	Universidad de Concepción	34	(2)
2018–2021	Santiago Wanderers	82	(5)
2021	Universidad de Concepción	10	(0)
2022–2024	Cobresal	48	(3)
2025–	Deportes Recoleta	0	(0)

International career
2008	Chile U23	1	(0)
- * Club domestic league appearances and goals as of 6 January 2025

Francisco Arturo Alarcón Cruz (Spanish pronunciation: [fɾanˈsisko aɾˈtuɾo alaɾˈkoŋ ˈkɾus], born 25 February 1990) is a Chilean professional footballer who plays as a centre back or defensive midfielder for Deportes Recoleta.

== Club career ==
Alarcón spent two seasons with Cobresal, becoming the runner-up in the 2023 Chilean Primera División.

In 2025, Alarcón signed with Deportes Recoleta.

== International career ==
Alarcón represented Chile U23 at the 2008 Inter Continental Cup in Malaysia.

== Honours ==
Santiago Wanderers

- Primera B: 2019
