= Héctor Almandoz =

Argentine footballer

Personal information
- Full name: Héctor Alfredo Almandoz
- Date of birth: 17 January 1969 (age 57)
- Place of birth: Morón, Argentina
- Height: 1.81 m (5 ft 11 in)
- Position: Defender

Youth career
- Vélez Sarsfield

Senior career*
Years	Team	Apps	(Gls)
1988–1995	Vélez Sarsfield	97	(1)
1989–1990	→ Quilmes (loan)	44	(2)
1995	Estudiantes LP	14	(0)
1996–1997	San Lorenzo	29	(1)
1997–1998	Deportivo Español	26	(0)
1998–1999	Maccabi Haifa	1	(0)
1999	De Graafschap	1	(0)
1999	Santa Cruz	1	(0)
2000–2001	Chacarita Juniors	12	(0)
2002	Melgar	2	(0)
2002	Aguascalientes	20	(0)
2003	Chacarita Juniors	9	(0)
2003	Aurora	18	(0)
2004	Deportivo Quito	10	(0)
2004	Jorge Wilstermann	8	(1)
2006	Almirante Brown	9	(1)
2007	Cerámica Argentina		

Managerial career
- 2008–2013: Vélez Sarsfield II
- 2013: Vélez Sarsfield (assistant)
- 2015: Defensa y Justicia (assistant)
- 2015–2016: Rangers
- 2018–2020: Deportes Copiapó
- 2020: Deportes Antofagasta
- 2021: Cobreloa
- 2022–2023: Deportes Copiapó
- 2024: Club de Lyon
- 2024–2025: Curicó Unido
- 2026: Deportes Copiapó
- * Club domestic league appearances and goals

Héctor Alfredo "Coyo" Almandoz (born 17 January 1969) is an Argentine football manager and former professional player. As a player, he played as a defender.

== Coaching career ==
From May 2024 to July 2025, Almandoz led Curicó Unido.

== Personal life ==
He is married to Silvina Rivero.
