= Agustín Ortiz =

Chilean footballer

Personal information
- Full name: Agustín Ignacio Ortiz Moreno
- Date of birth: 30 January 1999 (age 27)
- Place of birth: Puente Alto, Santiago, Chile
- Height: 1.82 m (6 ft 0 in)
- Position: Defender

Team information
- Current team: Deportes Copiapó
- Number: 4

Youth career
- 2013–2018: Colo-Colo

Senior career*
Years	Team	Apps	(Gls)
2019–2022	Colo-Colo	0	(0)
2020–2022	→ Deportes Copiapó (loan)	56	(2)
2023–	Deportes Copiapó	42	(2)
2024	→ Barnechea (loan)	22	(0)
- * Club domestic league appearances and goals as of 19 January 2026

Agustín Ignacio Ortiz Moreno (born 30 January 1999) is a Chilean footballer who plays as a defender for Deportes Copiapó.

== Club career ==
Born in Puente Alto commune, Santiago de Chile, Ortiz joined the Colo-Colo youth ranks at the age of 14 and was promoted to the first team in 2019 under Mario Salas. He was sent on loan to Deportes Copiapó for the 2020 season. He continued on loan with them until the 2022 season and got promotion to the Chilean top level in the same year. He continued with them in the 2023 Chilean Primera División.

In 2024, Ortiz was loaned out to Barnechea. Back to Deportes Copiapó, he reached 100 official matches with them in August 2025 and also they reached the promotion play-offs in the 2025 season.
