= Felipe Núñez =

Venezuelan-born Chilean footballer and manager

Personal information
- Full name: Felipe Alejandro Núñez Becerra
- Date of birth: 25 February 1979 (age 47)
- Place of birth: Caracas, Venezuela
- Height: 1.77 m (5 ft 10 in)
- Position: Goalkeeper

Youth career
- Santo Tomás de Villanueva
- 1993–1999: Colo-Colo

College career
Years	Team	Apps	(Gls)
2005	Gabriela Mistral University		

Senior career*
Years	Team	Apps	(Gls)
2000–2002	Colo-Colo	0	(0)
2000–2001	→ Fernández Vial (loan)	32	(1)
2001	→ Deportes Melipilla (loan)	0	(0)
2002–2004	Acapulco	13	(0)
2004–2014	Palestino	230	(0)
2015–2016	Huachipato	41	(0)
2016–2017	Deportivo La Guaira	13	(0)
2017	Santiago Wanderers	0	(0)
Total		328	(1)

International career
1998–1999	Chile U20	1	(0)
2000	Chile U23	0	(0)

Managerial career
- 2019: Colchagua (assistant)
- 2020–2023: Deportes Recoleta
- 2024: Herrera FC B
- 2024: Herrera FC (assistant)
- 2025: Deportes Santa Cruz
- 2026–: La Roca FC (gk coach)
- * Club domestic league appearances and goals

Felipe Alejandro Núñez Becerra (born 25 February 1979) is a Venezuelan–born Chilean football manager, journalist and former goalkeeper well known for his spell at Palestino.

== Early life ==
Núñez was born in Caracas, Venezuela, to Chilean parents. During his stay at Caribbean country he played tournaments for his school team under the coaching of Lino Alonso, historic football-man in the Venezuelan football history. He lived there until 1991 when he moved to his homeland and settled in his grandfather’s house at Santiago commune of Estación Central after his parents divorce.

== Club career ==
He started his career at Colo-Colo youth set-up aged fifteen. After the club’s bankruptcy he left the club and joined second-tier side Arturo Fernandez Vial in 2000. In Concepción–based side, Núñez was first-choice keeper, playing 32 games during his spell and even scoring one goal, after netting a free kick score in a 4–1 home win over Unión San Felipe.

In mid-2002, he went to Mexico along Sebastián González who completed his move to top-level team Atlante. However Chamagol recommended him to play at the club’s filial Potros Neza, which Núñez successfully joined.

In 2004 Núñez returned to his country and joined Palestino. As an anecdote, in 2005 he took part of the reality TV show Adidas Selection Team from Fox Sports Chile, where a squad made up by youth players from professional teams faced players from schools, standing out future professional footballers such as Felipe Seymour, Nelson Saavedra, Eduardo Vargas, among others. In the same year, he also represented the Gabriela Mistral University team under Eduardo Bonvallet. He was an undisputed started and captain during his ten-year spell in the Arab Palestininian community club. There he reached the 2008 Torneo Clausura runner-up (where was red carded in the first leg final) and was included in the league’s team of the tournament by football magazine El Gráfico. On 5 September 2014, he resigned from Palestino after differences with the coach Pablo Guede.

On 22 January 2015, Núñez signed for Huachipato, after reaching a 18-month contract.

== International career ==
Núñez was second-choice for the Chilean under-20 team that played the 1999 South American U-20 Championship and the under-23 team that reached the 2000 Summer Olympics. Previously, along with Chile U20, he won the L'Alcúdia Tournament in 1998.

In 2012, he received an offer from the Venezuelan Football Federation to play for its national team, but this however didn’t thrived.

== Managerial career ==
In 2019, he worked as the assistant coach of Francisco Arrué in Chilean Segunda División side Colchagua. In 2020, he became the manager of Deportes Recoleta in the same division. He left the club in September 2023.

In the second half of 2024, Núñez moved to Panama and assumed as the assistant coach of Ever Demaldé in Herrera FC in the top division as well as the coach of the B-team in the second level. At the end of 2024, he returned to Chile and assumed as manager of Deportes Santa Cruz.

In 2026, Núñez moved to the United States to work as a goalkeeping coach for a high school and La Roca FC.

== Outside of football ==
In the mid 2010s, he completed a Bachelor of Arts in journalism at the University of the Americas.

== Honours ==
Chile U20

- L'Alcúdia International Tournament (1): 1998

== See also ==
- List of goalscoring goalkeepers
