= Damián Sáez =

Chilean footballer (born 2001)

Personal information
- Full name: Damián Maximiliano Sáez Díaz
- Date of birth: 29 August 2001 (age 25)
- Place of birth: Temuco, Chile
- Position: Forward

Team information
- Current team: Deportes Copiapó
- Number: 34

Youth career
- Deportes Temuco

Senior career*
Years	Team	Apps	(Gls)
2019–2023	Deportes Temuco	80	(9)
2024	Trasandino	21	(0)
2025	Santiago City	1	(0)
2026–	Deportes Copiapó	0	(0)
- * Club domestic league appearances and goals as of 5 May 2025

Damián Maximiliano Sáez Díaz (born Damián Maximiliano García Díaz, 29 August 2001), also known as Damián Maximiliano, is a Chilean professional footballer who plays as a forward for Deportes Copiapó.

== Career ==
A product of Deportes Temuco, Sáez played for them until December 2023. The next year, he switched to Trasandino in the Segunda División Profesional de Chile.

In 2026, Sáez joined Deportes Copiapó.
