= Hernán Castro =

Chilean footballer (1961–2021)

Personal information
- Full name: Hernán Segundo Castro Venegas
- Date of birth: 14 August 1961
- Place of birth: Santiago, Chile
- Date of death: 17 August 2021 (aged 60)
- Place of death: Santiago, Chile
- Position: Left winger

Youth career
- Chileno Árabe
- 1975–1980: Audax Italiano

Senior career*
Years	Team	Apps	(Gls)
1980–1982	Audax Italiano	29	(6)
1983	Santiago Wanderers	31	(7)
1984	Audax Italiano		
1984	Santiago Wanderers	27	(1)
1985–1986	Audax Italiano	54	(13)
1987	Huachipato	4	(1)
1987	Coquimbo Unido		(1)
1988	Audax Italiano		(7)
1989	Unión La Calera		(4)
1990–1992	Morelia	31	
1992	Unión San Felipe		(3)
- * Club domestic league appearances and goals

Hernán Segundo Castro Venegas (14 August 1961 – 17 August 2021) was a Chilean professional footballer who played as a left winger for clubs in Chile and Mexico.

== Career ==
As a child, Castro was with Chileno Árabe before joining Audax Italiano youth system, making his professional debut thanks to the coach Hernán Godoy.

A well remembered player of Audax Italiano and Santiago Wanderers in the first half 1980s, in his homeland he also played for Huachipato, Coquimbo Unido, Unión La Calera and Unión San Felipe.

He also had a successful stint with Mexican side Atlético Morelia from 1990 to 1992 in the top division, making thirty one appearances.

=== Controversies ===
As a professional footballer, Castro smoked marijuana and drank alcohol.

At the beginning of his stint with Coquimbo Unido, he spat at a referee and was suspended for around 18 matchdays.

== Personal life ==
Castro was better known by his nickname Indio (Indian).

As a player of Morelia, he earned over 30 millions Mexican pesos what he squandered back in Chile. In addition, he was in prison for assaulting his wife.

After his retirement, he worked as a builder, welder and pipe assembler. He fell into a depression and lived in a garbage drump in Cerro Navia commune, despite he sometimes was helped by former colleagues, dying in the street on 17 August 2021.
