= 2021 Campeonato Nacional Primera B =

Primera B de Chile
- Season: 2021
- Dates: 3 April – 10 December 2021
- Champions: Coquimbo Unido (4th title)
- Promoted: Coquimbo Unido
- Relegated: San Marcos de Arica
- Matches: 246
- Goals: 602 (2.45 per match)
- Top goalscorer: Manuel López (21 goals)
- Biggest home win: Dep. Copiapó 5–0 Rangers (12 September); Dep. Iquique 6–1 Dep. Santa Cruz (3 October)
- Biggest away win: Dep. Santa Cruz 1–7 Coquimbo (18 May)
- Highest scoring: Dep. Santa Cruz 1–7 Coquimbo (18 May)

The 2021 Primera B de Chile, also known as Campeonato Ascenso Betsson 2021 for sponsorship purposes, was the 67th season of the Campeonato Nacional Primera B, Chile's second-tier football league. The season started on 3 April 2021.

Coquimbo Unido were the champions, winning their fourth title in the competition as well as clinching promotion to Primera División with a 2–1 victory over Fernandez Vial on 13 November, the last matchday of the regular season.

== Format ==
The tournament was played by 16 teams, 12 returning from the previous season, three relegated from Campeonato Nacional (Coquimbo Unido, Deportes Iquique and Universidad de Concepción), and the Segunda División Profesional champions. The 16 teams play each other in a double round-robin tournament (once at home and once away) for a total of 30 matches. The top team at the end of the 30 rounds was the champion and was promoted to the Campeonato Nacional for its 2022 season, with the next four teams playing a play-off stage with its winner qualifying for a promotion/relegation play-off against the 15th-placed team of the Campeonato Nacional. On the other hand, the bottom-placed team of the table was relegated to the Segunda División Profesional.

== Teams ==
Originally, Lautaro de Buin were to take part in the competition as 2020 Segunda División Profesional champions, but the club was suspended per ruling by ANFP's Court of Justice due to irregularities with the contracts of their players, and later expelled from the ANFP on 5 May 2021. Following an appeal by Lautaro de Buin, on 10 June 2021 the original ruling was changed to a six-point deduction in the Segunda División standings, thereby losing the first place and declaring Fernandez Vial as Segunda División champions, who in turn also took Lautaro's place in Primera B.

=== Stadia and locations ===
Locations of the 2021 Primera B de Chile teams

Club	City	Stadium	Capacity
Barnechea	Santiago (Lo Barnechea)	Municipal de Lo Barnechea	3,000
Cobreloa	Calama	Zorros del Desierto	12,346
Coquimbo Unido	Coquimbo	Francisco Sánchez Rumoroso	18,750
Deportes Copiapó	Copiapó	Luis Valenzuela Hermosilla	8,000
Deportes Iquique	Iquique	Tierra de Campeones	13,171
Deportes Puerto Montt	Puerto Montt	Chinquihue	10,000
Deportes Santa Cruz	Santa Cruz	Joaquín Muñoz García	5,000
Deportes Temuco	Temuco	Germán Becker	18,413
Fernandez Vial	Concepción	Alcaldesa Ester Roa Rebolledo	30,448
Magallanes	Santiago (San Bernardo)	Municipal Luis Navarro Avilés	3,500
Rangers	Talca	Fiscal de Talca	8,200
San Luis	Quillota	Lucio Fariña Fernández	7,680
San Marcos de Arica	Arica	Carlos Dittborn	9,746
Santiago Morning	Santiago (La Pintana)	Municipal de La Pintana	6,000
Unión San Felipe	San Felipe	Municipal de San Felipe	12,000
Universidad de Concepción	Concepción	Alcaldesa Ester Roa Rebolledo	30,448

== Standings ==
Pos	Team	Pld	W	D	L	GF	GA	GD	Pts	Qualification or relegation
1	Coquimbo Unido (C, P)	30	14	13	3	42	22	+20	55	Promotion to Primera División
2	Deportes Copiapó	30	14	10	6	49	36	+13	52	Advance to Play-offs
3	Santiago Morning	30	13	12	5	43	26	+17	51	Advance to Play-offs
4	Deportes Temuco	30	13	10	7	44	28	+16	49	Advance to Play-offs
5	Deportes Puerto Montt	30	12	12	6	34	30	+4	48	Advance to Play-offs
6	Deportes Santa Cruz	30	12	9	9	36	37	−1	45	
7	Magallanes	30	9	14	7	38	34	+4	41	
8	Deportes Iquique	30	11	7	12	52	45	+7	40	
9	Fernández Vial	30	11	7	12	45	39	+6	40	
10	San Luis	30	9	13	8	33	32	+1	40	
11	Unión San Felipe	30	10	6	14	34	40	−6	36	
12	Rangers	30	9	8	13	34	42	−8	35	
13	Cobreloa	30	8	10	12	35	38	−3	33	
14	Universidad de Concepción	30	7	12	11	32	37	−5	33	
15	Barnechea	30	5	9	16	28	44	−16	24	
16	San Marcos de Arica (R)	30	3	8	19	11	60	−49	16	Relegation to Segunda División Profesional

Source: ANFP, Soccerway
Rules for classification: 1) Points, 2) Goal difference, 3) Matches won, 4) Goals for, 5) Away goals for, 6) Red cards, 7) Yellow cards, 8) Drawing of lots, 9) Playoff game (only if needed to decide championship).
If needed to decide championship between two teams: 2) Playoff game.
(C) Champions; (P) Promoted; (R) Relegated

== Results ==
Home \ Away	BAR	COB	COQ	CDC	IQQ	DPM	DSC	TEM	AFV	MAG	RAN	SLQ	SMA	SM	USF	UDC
Barnechea	—	1–1	0–1	0–2	3–1	0–1	0–0	2–0	0–3	0–1	2–3	0–0	1–1	0–2	2–4	1–2
Cobreloa	1–2	—	1–1	2–0	3–2	2–0	0–1	0–2	1–2	2–1	4–1	1–0	— (Note: The match originally ended with Cobreloa winning by a 1–0 score, but was awarded 3–0 to San Marcos de Arica as Cobreloa fielded the ineligible player Jaime Soto. However, since San Marcos de Arica was later punished for having fielded the ineligible player Zederick Vega in this match, no winner was declared and no points were assigned to either team.)	2–2	2–1	2–4
Coquimbo Unido	1–1	2–1	—	0–0	3–1	0–0	0–0	1–1	1–0	1–1	1–1	0–1	3–0 (Note: Matches awarded as 3–0 losses for San Marcos de Arica as they called up the ineligible player Zederick Vega. The original scores in the matches in which Vega was fielded were: San Marcos 0–0 Cobreloa, San Marcos 1–2 Deportes Temuco, Coquimbo Unido 1–0 San Marcos, San Marcos 3–1 Unión San Felipe, San Luis 0–1 San Marcos, San Marcos 0–1 Deportes Copiapó, Deportes Puerto Montt 2–2 San Marcos, Universidad de Concepción 3–1 San Marcos, Deportes Santa Cruz 2–0 San Marcos, San Marcos 1–2 Magallanes, San Marcos 2–1 Fernández Vial, San Marcos 4–2 Deportes Iquique, Fernández Vial 1–2 San Marcos, San Marcos 4–0 Santiago Morning, and Deportes Temuco 2–0 San Marcos. Vega also played in San Marcos's home match against Barnechea and away match at Santiago Morning, both of which ended as 3–0 losses.)	2–1	4–1	1–0
Deportes Copiapó	1–1	0–0	2–1	—	0–2	2–2	2–0	1–1	1–1	1–1	5–0	4–1	1–1	2–2	1–0	2–0
Deportes Iquique	4–2	1–0	2–3	2–1	—	4–2	6–1	2–2	1–3	1–1	2–2	0–0	1–2	1–2	1–0	5–1
Deportes Puerto Montt	1–0	0–0	1–3	1–0	0–0	—	2–2	1–0	1–0	1–1	3–1	2–1	3–0	0–0	0–1	2–2
Deportes Santa Cruz	2–0	2–2	1–7	1–2	1–3	1–0	—	1–0	2–3	2–0	1–0	2–0	3–0	1–1	0–1	2–2
Deportes Temuco	2–0	1–0	1–1	1–1	2–1	1–1	0–1	—	2–1	3–0	2–2	2–2	3–0	0–2	3–0	2–2
Fernández Vial	1–1	3–2	1–2	5–2	0–1	2–3	2–1	1–0	—	0–1	2–2	2–2	3–0	0–0	1–3	0–0
Magallanes	1–1	2–2	0–0	3–0	2–2	3–0	1–1	0–3	2–1	—	0–1	3–3	1–3	0–1	2–1	3–0
Rangers	2–0	4–0	0–1	2–3	1–0	0–0	1–3	0–2	1–0	1–1	—	0–1	1–1	0–1	3–1	1–0
San Luis	2–1	1–0	0–0	1–2	1–1	0–1	0–0	1–1	3–2	1–1	0–1	—	3–0	2–2	1–2	1–0
San Marcos de Arica	0–3 (Note: Match awarded 3–0 to Barnechea as San Marcos de Arica manager Hernán Peña failed to serve his suspension for this match. The match originally ended with San Marcos de Arica winning by a 2–1 score.)	0–3	0–0	0–3	0–3	1–2	0–0	0–3	0–3	0–3	1–0	1–2	—	0–3	0–3	0–0
Santiago Morning	2–0	2–1	3–0	2–3	1–0	1–1	1–3	0–1	2–2	1–2	0–0	0–0	3–0	—	1–0	0–0
Unión San Felipe	2–4	0–0	1–1	2–3	3–1	2–3	1–0	1–2	0–1	0–0	2–1	1–1	0–0	0–2	—	1–0
Universidad de Concepción	0–0	0–0	0–1	1–2	3–1	0–0	0–1	3–1	2–0	1–1	3–2	0–2	3–0	3–3	0–0	—

Source: ANFP, Soccerway
Legend: Blue = home team win; Yellow = draw; Red = away team win.

== Play-offs ==
=== Bracket ===
Semi-finals
4	Santiago Morning	1	1	2
3	Deportes Temuco	1	2	3
5	Deportes Puerto Montt	0	2	2
2	Deportes Copiapó	1	2	3

Finals
3	Deportes Temuco	1	1	2
2	Deportes Copiapó	0	3	3

=== Semi-finals ===
25 November 2021
20:30

Deportes Puerto Montt	0–1	Deportes Copiapó
	Report	López 52'

Estadio Regional de Chinquihue, Puerto Montt
Attendance: 4,200
Referee: Matías Quila
1 December 2021
17:45

Deportes Copiapó	2–2	Deportes Puerto Montt
López 31', 42'	Report	Castillo 56', 77'

Estadio Luis Valenzuela Hermosilla, Copiapó
Attendance: 4,790
Referee: Piero Maza

Deportes Copiapó won 3–2 on aggregate and advanced to the finals.

25 November 2021
18:00

Santiago Morning	1–1	Deportes Temuco
Riveros 54'	Report	Escobar 49'

Estadio Municipal, La Pintana
Attendance: 609
Referee: Nicolás Gamboa
1 December 2021
20:30

Deportes Temuco	2–1	Santiago Morning
Ponce 44'; Castro 51'	Report	Pino 61'

Estadio Municipal Germán Becker, Temuco
Attendance: 9,472
Referee: Felipe González

Deportes Temuco won 3–2 on aggregate and advanced to the finals.

=== Finals ===
6 December 2021
20:00

Deportes Temuco	1–0	Deportes Copiapó
Pacheco 84'	Report

Estadio Municipal Germán Becker, Temuco
Attendance: 11,933
Referee: Manuel Vergara
10 December 2021
17:45

Deportes Copiapó	3–1	Deportes Temuco
Núñez 8'; López 38', 63'	Report	Gutiérrez 46'

Estadio Luis Valenzuela Hermosilla, Copiapó
Attendance: 4,800
Referee: José Cabero

Deportes Copiapó won 3–2 on aggregate and qualified for the promotion/relegation play-off.

== Top scorers ==
Rank	Name	Club	Goals
1	(Argentina) Manuel López	Deportes Copiapó	21
2	(Chile) Steffan Pino	Santiago Morning	14
3	(Chile) Kevin Harbottle	Fernández Vial	13
4	(Argentina) Leandro Garate	Coquimbo Unido	12
5	(Argentina) Lionel Altamirano	Universidad de Concepción	11
5	(Chile) Carlos Escobar	Deportes Temuco	11
7	(Argentina) Alfredo Ábalos	Rangers	10
7	(Venezuela) Reiner Castro	Deportes Temuco	10
7	(Chile) Felipe Flores	Barnechea	10
7	(Chile) Álvaro Ramos	Deportes Iquique	10

Source: Soccerway

== Promotion/relegation play-off ==
The winners of the Primera B play-offs, Deportes Copiapó, played Huachipato, the team placed 15th in the 2021 Chilean Primera División, in a double-legged series. The winners earned the right to play in the top flight for the following season.

22 January 2022
18:00 UTC−3

Deportes Copiapó	2–3	Huachipato
Jaime 32'; López 82'	Report	Nequecaur 13', 28'; García 59' (o.g.)

Estadio Luis Valenzuela Hermosilla, Copiapó
Referee: Felipe González

26 January 2022
19:00 UTC−3

Huachipato	1–0	Deportes Copiapó
Martínez 74' (pen.)	Report

Estadio Huachipato-CAP Acero, Talcahuano
Referee: Francisco Gilabert

Huachipato won 4–2 on aggregate and remained in Primera División.

== See also ==
- 2021 Chilean Primera División
- 2021 Copa Chile
