= Rubén Sánchez (artist) =

Spanish artist

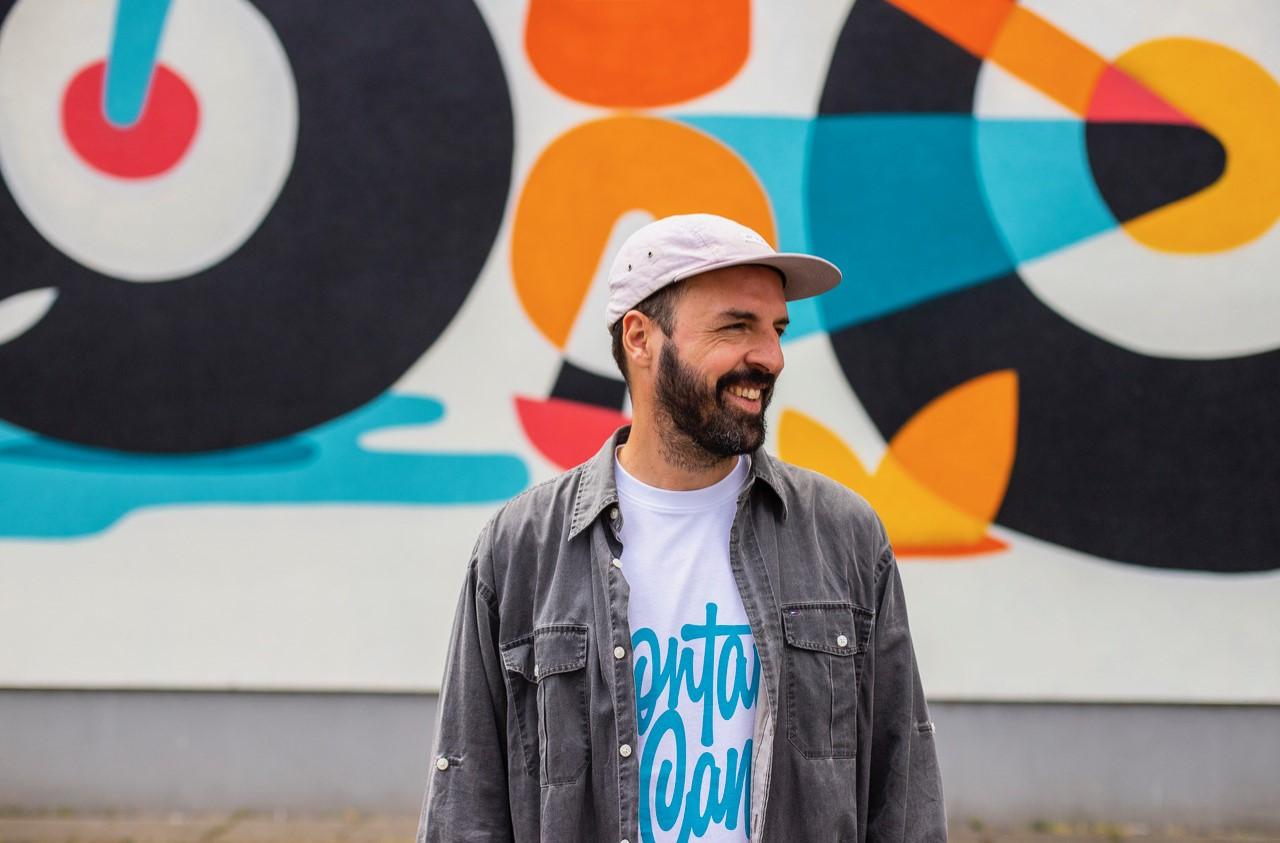
- Born: 1979 (age 46–47); Madrid, Spain
- Known for: Contemporary art and street art
- Website: https://www.iamrubensanchez.com

Rubén Sánchez also known as Zoonchez is a Spanish artist known for creating colorful compositions in his works, mostly with elements in balance. He has made sculptures and large-scale public murals works in Canada, UAE, France, Jordan, Germany, Turkey, Hungary, Sweden and the United States.

== Early life ==
Sánchez was born in Madrid in 1979. He developed an interest in graffiti at the age of 13. He later quit school and started working day jobs. Feeling tired of these jobs, he took interest in learning graphic design. In the 2000s, he moved to Barcelona and worked in different graphic design agencies. During this time period, he started creating his first artworks on reclaimed materials and created his first signature characters in the streets.

== Career ==
Sánchez began his artistic career at street level, where he mostly painted graffiti. Later he began drawing illustrations and mixed illustration with his original graffiti skills. He made several of these artworks in streets and public places as well as on different mediums such canvases, wood and all type of recycled materials.

In 2012, Sánchez began his one-year art residency program at Tashkeel in Dubai established by Lateefa bint Maktoum. During this time, he created a vast number of artworks and painted the first public outdoor mural in the country (non-commercial). This residency helped him become a full-time artist.

In 2019, he designed the brand identity of the UEFA Champions League Finals in Madrid.

Sánchez has also conducted several humanitarian projects throughout his career. Between 2014 and 2016, he created several murals in refugee camps in Zaatari (Jordan) and Lesbos (Greece). In collaboration with AptART, he conducted different projects to highlight the views of children from Syria and Jordan regarding their homes, after a civil war in Syria made people leave their homes and reside in refugee camps. Later on, he created in Russeifa (Jordan) a mural, Pushing Boundaries to highlight women rights and other gender issues.

== Style and influences ==
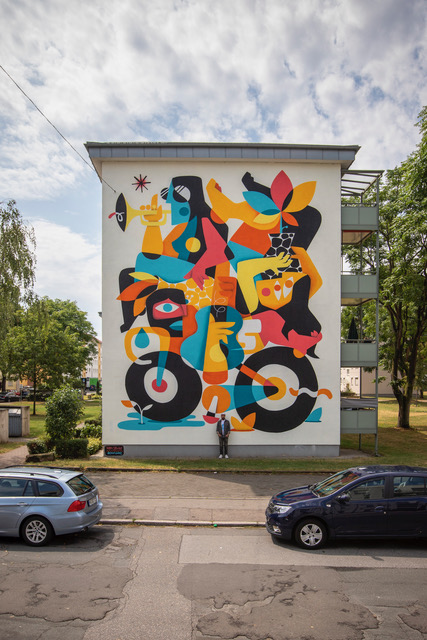
„Multicultural Balance“ (2019), Heustraße, Mannheim

Sánchez's work is characterized by vibrant color palettes, asymmetry and lack of perfect proportions. He tends to convey certain messages and concerns through his art where the viewer is challenged to depict. In a major mural project, Sanchez used tribal art in surrealism style rendered in Mediterranean colors and presented "a woman oppressed by the walls of her house trying to take down the walls and metaphorically opening herself to the world."

Sánchez's canvases, murals, ceramics, and large public sculptures depict a strong Mediterranean influence. He cites "Joan Miró, Le Corbusier or Henri Matisse or Pablo Picasso, or Juan Gris" as his main influences. His recent artworks exhibit a variety of themes, including connectivity, human imperfection, balances and imbalances.

== Selected exhibitions ==
- 2022 – Urban Break, Volery Gallery, Seoul
- 2022 – LA Art Fair, Moberg Booth, Los Angeles
- 2022 – Embodiment, Heron Arts, San Francisco
- 2022 – Contemporary Abstraction, Moberg Gallery, Des Moines, Iowa
- 2022 – Panorama, Cohle Gallery, Menorca
- 2021 – Emoción, Galería Ola, Barcelona
- 2020 – Recién Pintado, Centro Cultural El Carm, Badalona
- 2020 – Beyond the Walls, Cohle Gallery, Paris
- 2020 – SWAY, Moberg Gallery, Des Moines, Iowa
- 2019 – In Bloom, Moberg Gallery, Des Moines, Iowa
- 2019 – New Start, Happy Gallery, Paris
- 2018 – 10 Years Later, Tashkeel, Dubai
- 2017 – Refuge in Paint, NAMLA, Miami
- 2016 – Connectivity, Tashkeel, Dubai
- 2016 – The Lucid Dream, Installation, Dubai Design District, Dubai
- 2015 – Contemporary Istanbul, Istanbul
- 2015 – Fisticuffs, Dubai
- 2015 – It's Summertime!, London
- 2014 – Colors of Resilience, Amman
- 2014 – Art Dubai, Dubai
- 2014, 2015 – Made in Tashkeel, Dubai (UAE)
- 2013 – Sikka Art Fair, Dubai
- 2013 – The B Side, Solo Show, Tashkeel Gallery, Dubai
- 2012 – Reskate Exhibition, Bright Tradeshow, Berlin
- 2012–2013 – Gráfika, 30 Artists from a young Spain. World Tour
- 2012 – Vias Subversivas, Mallorca
- 2011 – Proyecto Haiti, Barcelona
- 2009 – Painting Alive, Apetit Gallery. Bilbao
- 2009 – Simbiosis, Espacio Espora, Madrid
- 2008 – Wood Pushers, Hecklewood Gallery, Portland
- 2006 – Hey Ho Let's Go, Barcelona
