= Francisco Arrué =

Chilean footballer and manager (born 1977)

Personal information
- Full name: Francisco Esteban Arrué Pardo
- Date of birth: 7 August 1977 (age 49)
- Place of birth: São Paulo, Brazil
- Height: 1.69 m (5 ft 7 in)
- Position: Midfielder

Team information
- Current team: Deportes Recoleta (manager)

Youth career
- 1987–1994: Colo-Colo

Senior career*
Years	Team	Apps	(Gls)
1994–1999	Colo-Colo	68	(7)
2000	Santiago Morning	25	(8)
2001	Universidad Católica	24	(6)
2002	Luzern	14	(2)
2003–2004	Leganés	16	(0)
2004	Puebla	12	(0)
2005–2006	Universidad Católica	68	(14)
2007	Universidad de Chile	37	(2)
2008	Atlético Nacional	10	(1)
2009–2010	Universidad de Concepción	43	(9)
2011	Santiago Morning	24	(5)
2012	Deportes La Serena	26	(5)
2013–2015	Huachipato	61	(7)
2016	Coquimbo Unido	27	(4)
Total		455	(70)

International career
2000	Chile Olympic	5	(0)
2006	Chile		

Managerial career
- 2019: Colchagua
- 2020–2021: Colchagua
- 2023: San Marcos
- 2023: Audax Italiano
- 2024: Audax Italiano
- 2025: Ñublense
- 2026–: Deportes Recoleta
- * Club domestic league appearances and goals

Francisco Esteban Arrué Pardo (born 7 August 1977) is a football manager and former footballer who played as a midfielder. He is the current manager of Deportes Recoleta.

Born in Brazil, Arrué represented Chile at international level, playing for the Olympic team in the 2000 Summer Olympics.

== Club career ==
Arrué is one of the six Chilean players who have played in his country's three giant clubs: Colo-Colo, Universidad de Chile and Universidad Católica.

== International career ==
Representing his nation, he won a bronze medal in the 2000 Summer Olympics in Sydney.

Arrué also represented the Chile senior team against Aragon on 28 December 2006.

== Managerial career ==
Arrué has coached Colchagua two times in the Chilean Segunda División: 2019 and 2020–2021. He joined San Marcos de Arica for the 2023 season in the Primera B.

In the second half of 2023, Arrué led Audax Italiano. He coached them by second time between March and July 2024.

Arrué signed with Ñublense for the 2025 season. The next year, he assumed as manager of Deportes Recoleta.

== Other works ==
Following his retirement, Arrué worked as a football commentator for the Chilean TV channel Canal del Fútbol.

== Honours ==
=== Player ===
Santiago Morning

- Copa Chile: Runner-up 2000

Universidad Católica

- Primera División de Chile: 2005 Clausura

Universidad de Concepción

- Copa Chile: 2008–09

Chile U23

- Sydney Olympic Games (1): Bronze medal 2000
