= Mario Briceño =

Chilean footballer (born 1996)

Personal information
- Full name: Mario Cristián Osmín Briceño Portilla
- Date of birth: 20 June 1996 (age 30)
- Place of birth: La Serena, Chile
- Height: 1.80 m (5 ft 11 in)
- Positions: Winger; forward

Team information
- Current team: Huachipato

Youth career
- Deportes La Serena

Senior career*
Years	Team	Apps	(Gls)
2014–2016	Deportes La Serena	37	(6)
2016–2019	Universidad de Chile	19	(1)
2017	→ Deportes Antofagasta (loan)	9	(2)
2018	→ Curicó Unido (loan)	5	(0)
2019	→ Barnechea (loan)	16	(5)
2020–2021	Ñublense	24	(6)
2021	Lautaro de Buin	0	(0)
2021	Rangers	7	(0)
2022–2023	Unión San Felipe	42	(18)
2024–	Huachipato	9	(1)
- * Club domestic league appearances and goals as of 18 December 2023

Mario Cristián Osmín Briceño Portilla (born 20 June 1996) is a Chilean footballer who plays as a winger for Huachipato.

== Honours ==
Universidad de Chile

- Primera División: 2017–C

Ñublense

- Primera B: 2020

Huachipato

- Copa Chile: 2025
