= Roberto Riveros =

Chilean footballer (born 1996)

Personal information
- Full name: Roberto Ignacio Riveros Uribe
- Date of birth: 27 February 1994 (age 32)
- Place of birth: Santiago, Chile
- Position: Striker

Team information
- Current team: Deportes Recoleta
- Number: 33

Youth career
- Colo-Colo

Senior career*
Years	Team	Apps	(Gls)
2012–2014	Colo-Colo B	6	(0)
2015–2016	Colo-Colo	2	(0)
2016–2017	Deportes Santa Cruz	19	(3)
2018	Rodelindo Román	–	(–)
2019	Colchagua	24	(12)
2019–2020	Cobreloa	25	(6)
2021	Santiago Morning	28	(7)
2022	Deportes Iquique	26	(4)
2024–2025	Deportes Recoleta	41	(15)
2025	Deportes Temuco	21	(5)
2026	Curicó Unido	8	(1)
2026–	Deportes Recoleta	0	(0)
- * Club domestic league appearances and goals as of 20 June 2026

Roberto Ignacio Riveros Uribe (born 27 February 1994) is a Chilean footballer who plays as a striker for Deportes Recoleta.

== Early life ==
As a youth player, Riveros joined the youth academy of Chilean side Colo-Colo. He was described as "stood out in the... youth system, made the jump to the first team in 2014, but never managed to establish himself" while playing for the club.

== Career ==
Riveros played for Rodelindo Román in 2018. In 2022, Riveros signed for Chilean side Iquique. In 2023, he signed for Chilean side Recoleta.

Riveros joined Curicó Unido for the 2026 season. He switched to Deportes Recoleta in June of the same year.

== Style of play ==
Riveros mainly operates as a striker. He is known for his speed.

== Personal life ==
Riveros was born in 1994 in Chile. He is a native of Puente Alto, Santiago.
