= Deportes Vallenar =

Chilean football club

- Full name: Club de Deportes Vallenar
- Nickname: Los Verdes
- Founded: June 06, 2013
- Ground: Estadio Municipal Nelson Rojas; Vallenar, Chile
- Capacity: 6,000
- Chairman: John Sol
- Manager: Fernando Gajardo
- League: Tercera A
- 2020: Segunda División, 11th (relegated)
Home colours	Away colours

Club de Deportes Vallenar is a Chilean Football club, their home town is Vallenar, Chile. They currently play in the fourth level of Chilean football, the Tercera A.

The club was founded in the "Población Baquedano" of Vallenar. It is the only one that represents and has represented the city of Vallenar in the Chilean soccer.

On 15 May 2010 made his debut in the Copa Chile, playing a match against Deportes La Serena, receiving a win by 0–12 in the first leg, while in the return match played in the Estadio La Portada, lost by 7–0, leaving a global marker of 19–0 in favor of the team of the fourth region.

The club it was accepted in 2013 to play the Tercera División B under the name of Estrella del Huasco, During the "Torneo de Apertura 2013", the club ends first of its group (Grupo "Nuevos"), obtaining 3 bonus points for the next tournament. In the "Torneo de Clausura 2013", the club ends in the third position in the "Grupo Norte". With this result, classifies the final hex to then obtain the runners-up in the Tercera División B, ascending to the Tercera División A.

In 2014, after ascend to the Tercera División A de Chile changed its name to Club de Deportes Vallenar. In the tournament, ends in the worst position of its brief history: 5°. On 12 December 2015, Deportes Vallenar defeat 2–0 to Deportivo Estación Central, ensuring at least the second place in the Tercera División A to 2015 in the penultimate date. With this is assured one of the 2 posts direct ascent to the Segunda División de Chile. At the end of the season, Deportes Vallenar was in the second position. The club will play for the first time in its history, in the professionalism from the year 2016.

In its short history the club has participated for 1 year in Tercera División B, 2 years in Tercera División A, and 1 year in the Segunda División.

== Seasons played ==
- 1 season in Segunda División
- 2 seasons in Tercera División A
- 1 season in Tercera División B

== Honours ==
Tercera A de Chile
Runner-up 2015
Tercera B de Chile
Runner-up 2013

== Current squad ==
As of 20 September 2019

Note: Flags indicate national team as defined under FIFA eligibility rules; some limited exceptions apply. Players may hold more than one non-FIFA nationality.

No.	Pos.	Nation	Player
—	GK	CHI	Carlos Julio
—	GK	CHI	Juan Segovia
—	GK	CHI	Benjamín Urtulla
—	DF	CHI	Benjamín Aguilera
—	DF	CHI	Jordano Cisterna
—	DF	CHI	Fidel Córdova
—	DF	URU	Matías Fracchia
—	DF	CHI	Ítalo Pizarro
—	DF	CHI	Óscar Quijada
—	DF	CHI	Ricardo Rojas
—	DF	CHI	Fredy Vásquez
—	DF	CHI	Bruno Villablanca
—	DF	CHI	Juan Yáñez
—	MF	CHI	Merke Álvarez
—	MF	CHI	Francisco Arancibia
—	MF	ARG	Jonathan Chávez
—	MF	CHI	Luciano Cisterna
—	MF	CHI	Mauricio Díaz
—	MF	CHI	Maximiliano Fuenzalida

No.	Pos.	Nation	Player
—	MF	CHI	Ignacio Gordillo
—	MF	CHI	Carlos Gutiérrez
—	MF	CHI	Brayan Ossandón
—	MF	CHI	Fabian Pizarro
—	MF	CHI	Javier Ramírez
—	MF	CHI	Pedro Rojas
—	MF	CHI	Ariel Salinas
—	MF	CHI	Franco Seida
—	MF	CHI	Francisco Seriche
—	MF	CHI	Juan Toloza
—	MF	CHI	Sebastián Villalobos
—	FW	CHI	Roberto Abarca
—	FW	CHI	Francisco Acuña
—	FW	CHI	Francisco Araya
—	FW	CHI	Atilio Berríos
—	FW	CHI	Felipe Brito
—	FW	CHI	Francisco Cáceres
—	FW	CHI	Bairon Pizarro
—	FW	CHI	Matías Zamora

== Managers ==
- (Chile) Ramón Climent (2013)
- (Chile) Wilson Contreras (2014)
- (Chile) Ramón Climent (2015)
- (Chile) Rubén Martínez (2016)
- (Chile) Nelson Cossio (2016)
- (Chile) Francisco Michea (2016-2017)
- (Chile) Ramón Climent (2017-2018)
- (Chile) Ramón Climent (2023-Present)

== See also ==
- Chilean football league system
