= Deportes Recoleta =

Chilean football club

- Full name: Club de Deportes Recoleta S.A.D.P.
- Nicknames: Recoletanos; Albiazules
- Founded: 2014
- Ground: Estadio Municipal Leonel Sánchez Lineros; Recoleta, Chile
- Capacity: 5000
- Owner: Municipality of Recoleta
- Manager: Felipe Núñez
- League: Primera B
- 2025: Primera B, 11th of 16
Home colours	Away colours

Club de Deportes Recoleta, commonly shortened to Deportes Recoleta, is an association football club of Chile of the commune of Recoleta, situated in the town of Santiago. It was the champion of the Tercera División B in 2015 and the champion of the Segunda Division of Chile in 2021 playing now in the Primera B, the second level of Chilean football.

== History ==
The Corporación Municipal de Deportes de Recoleta through its mayor, Daniel Jadue, raises the interest of framing and develop a structural program it will be mainly the conformation of a sports club football of amateur nature that compete in the Tercera División B of the Championship ANFA, And that it develops under certain selective parameters that will generate a new organizational array in regard to the process of recruitment and training of future values that they perform in the sporting activity.

=== Official debut ===
The club was accepted to play the Tercera División B of Chile in the year 2014, the same year of its creation, in his first official match, falls defeated 1-0 to Quintero Unido, the first official victory of the recoletanos would come in the date 3, by beating him as a visitor 4-2 to another team that he debuted at the tournament, as it was Ferro Lampa. And your first triumph as local, was performed on the date 4, in the Estadio Municipal de Recoleta, before the historic Ferroviarios, defeating them 2-1. In that tournament the club ended in the second place of the North Zone with 38 points, one less than the leader, qualifying to the second phase. Despite all predictions, ended up being deleted, after falling before Real San Joaquin in the last date, plus another result that the left outside the playoff by the promotion, only by goal difference.

=== Absolute Cup 2015 ===
The year 2015 kept the good campaign, in the Copa Absoluta of Tercera División, where debuted in Tercera División A, front of the cast of Provincial Marga Marga in Quilpué where defeated them by 5-2. Finally they would remain in the second location behind Union Casablanca in the group 8, and would happen to the eighth-finals, where would confront to Deportes Vallenar. After a tie in the Gone by 1-1 in the Estadio Chacabuco and the tie 2-2 in the turn in the Estadio Nelson Rojas of Vallenar, the Albiazules classified by goals of visit to quarter-finals, to which arrived only two clubs of the Tercera División B that still litigated the promotion, Deportes Recoleta and Lautaro de Buin. For this phase, the Recoletanos would go back to equalise now in front of Union Casablanca 1-1 in the Estadio Chacabuco, but would fall in the duel of turn 1-0 in the Estadio Arturo Echazarreta with which would remain deleted and would lose the promotion, That would finish in hands of Lautaro de Buin the one who to the dessert classified to Semifinals after winning to Deportivo Estación Central.

=== First Title ===
Deportes Recoleta had his rematch for the official championship. It kept like leader 18 of the 22 dates of the first phase, obtaining 20 parties won, 1 tie and 1 defeat, for the final phase the Recoletanos split winning by 2-1 to Provincial Osorno in the Estadio Rubén Marcos Peralta, Although they were defeated by Athletic Club Colina, the albiazules attained to surpass and remained widely with the playoff, five points on the second, that to the dessert would be the same Provincial Osorno, what would close a year with a performance that kept it in command of the Tercera División B by almost all the championship and attaining the longed for promotion to the Tercera División A of Chile like champion.

=== Absolute Cup 2016 ===
The team of Recoleta came to the Copa Absoluta being the champion of the Tercera División B. had the poster of favorite to stay with the Group 7, where it was located. Surprisingly the club is eliminated in the first phase, leaving in third place of 5 teams, with 6 points.

=== Debut in Tercera A and ascent to professionalism ===
The official tournament from Tercera División A 2016 began with defeat for the albiazules, 1-2 compared with the historical club General Velásquez. After that, the set managed to build a solid base, arriving to be consolidated during the following meetings, the club maintained a correct performance, without peel never of the first places.

Deportes Recoleta of the hand of his coach, Fabián Marzuca, was leading from the date 14, consolidating its position as one of the candidates for the ascent. Finally, on 3 December 2016, the albiazules defeated Lautaro de Buin, by date 28, by 2-0, sealing its second consecutive ascent, and step, a milestone for the club: for the first time in its short history, would play in professional football Chilean.

== Team colours ==
Uniform

- Home uniform: white jersey with blue details, blue shorts, blue socks.
- Away uniform: blue jersey with white details, white shorts, white socks.

=== Shirt sponsors ===
List of Kit Manufacturers

- Training Professional (2014–present)

List of Shirt Sponsors

- Vega Central (2014–present)

== Seasons played ==
- 2 season in Primera B
- 5 season in Segunda División
- 1 season in Tercera División A
- 2 seasons in Tercera División B

== Honours ==
Nationals
Competition	Titles	Runners-up
Segunda División (1/0)	2021
Tercera División A (0/1)		2016
Tercera División B (1/0)	2015

== Squad ==
As of 14 August 2026. Note: Flags indicate national team as defined under FIFA eligibility rules; some limited exceptions apply. Players may hold more than one non-FIFA nationality.

No.	Pos.	Nation	Player
1	GK	CHI	Cristóbal Montenegro
2	DF	CHI	Francisco Lara
3	DF	CHI	Nicolás Arismendy
4	DF	CHI	Fabrizio Tomarelli (loan from Unión La Calera)
5	DF	CHI	Francisco Alarcón (c)
6	MF	CHI	Javier Espinoza
7	MF	CHI	Branco Provoste
8	MF	ARG	Federico Martin
9	FW	ARG	Germán Estigarribia
10	MF	CHI	Mikel Arguinarena
11	DF	CHI	Daniel Viveros
12	MF	CHI	José Sapiain
13	GK	CHI	José Narr
14	DF	CHI	Ignacio Lara
15	MF	CHI	Felipe Báez

No.	Pos.	Nation	Player
16	DF	CHI	Brayams Viveros
17	MF	CHI	Nicolás Carvajal
18	DF	ARG	Christian Cepeda
19	FW	CHI	Pedro Sánchez
20	FW	CHI	Carlos González
21	FW	CHI	Gonzalo Álvarez
22	GK	CHI	Jaime Vargas
23	GK	CHI	Álvaro Salazar
25	DF	CHI	Martín Esparza
26	MF	CHI	Benjamín Fuentes
27	FW	CHI	Felipe Flores
28	DF	CHI	Camilo Rodríguez
31	MF	CHI	Simón Quevedo
32	FW	CHI	Thomás Valenzuela
33	FW	CHI	Roberto Riveros

- Manager: Arrué

== Managers ==
- (Chile) Fabián Marzuca (2014-2019)
- (Chile) Felipe Núñez (2020-2023)
- (Chile) Luis Landeros (2023-2025)
- (Chile) Omar Toloza (2025)
- (Chile) Francisco Arrué (2026-)

== See also ==
- Chilean football league system
