= Deportes Copiapó =

Chilean football club

- Full name: Club de Deportes Copiapó
- Nicknames: El León de Atacama; Albirrojos
- Founded: 9 March 1999
- Ground: Estadio Luis Valenzuela Hermosilla, Copiapó, Chile
- Capacity: 8,000
- Chairman: Luis Galdames
- Manager: Hernán Caputto
- League: Primera B
- 2025: Primera B, 2nd of 16
Home colours	Away colours

Club de Deportes Copiapó — or simply Deportes Copiapó — is a Chilean football club based in Copiapó, Atacama Region. Founded in 1999 after Regional Atacama's folding, it currently plays in the Primera División, the first level of the Chilean football system, and holds its home games at Estadio Luis Valenzuela Hermosilla which has a capacity of 8,000 spectators.

The club has spent the most of its history playing in the Primera B, reaching its promotion to top-level (Primera División) for the first time in 2022. Its only one honour was the Tercera División title in 2002.

It has a rivalry with Cobresal.

== History ==
=== Early years: 1999–2012 ===
Deportes Copiapó was founded on 9 March 1999 following the disappearance of Regional Atacama, which had represented the city of Copiapó before financial difficulties led to its dissolution. The new club was established as Club de Deportes Copiapó S.A. and became the first sports corporation of its kind in Chile, with Ítalo González serving as its first president.

The club entered the Tercera División in its inaugural season and quickly became a regular promotion contender. Copiapó reached three consecutive finals between 2000 and 2002, losing the first two to Unión La Calera and Lota Schwager before defeating Malleco Unido 7–1 in the decisive match of the 2002 tournament. The victory gave the club its first official title and promotion to the Primera B.

Copiapó made its professional debut in 2003 with a 5–0 away victory over Deportes La Serena at the Estadio La Portada, a result that became one of the most notable debuts by a club promoted from Chilean amateur football.

The club established itself in Primera B and came close to reaching the top flight in 2007. Under manager Nelson Cossio, Copiapó finished fourth in the regular season and qualified for the promotion play-offs, where it competed against Santiago Morning and Puerto Montt. Although Copiapó defeated Puerto Montt 4–3 in the final match, Santiago Morning ultimately secured promotion.

After several seasons in Primera B, Copiapó competed in the newly established Segunda División Profesional in 2012. The club initially missed qualification for the promotion play-offs, but entered the competition after Deportes Temuco was excluded by the ANFP for financial irregularities. Copiapó then eliminated Trasandino and defeated Deportes Linares in both legs of the promotion final, winning the return match 2–1 at the Estadio Luis Valenzuela Hermosilla and returning immediately to Primera B.

=== Recent years ===
Following its return to Primera B, Deportes Copiapó gradually became a consistent promotion contender. The club finished runner-up in the 2017 Transición tournament and again challenged for promotion in subsequent seasons. In 2019, under Héctor Almandoz, Copiapó reached the final of the promotion play-offs, losing 3–2 to Deportes Temuco at the Estadio Nacional.

Another opportunity came in 2021, when Copiapó finished second in Primera B under Erwin Durán and earned the right to contest the promotion play-off against Huachipato. The series was ultimately decided in favour of Huachipato, leaving Copiapó in the second tier for another season.

The breakthrough finally came in 2022. After finishing third in Primera B with 52 points, Copiapó entered the promotion play-offs and eliminated Universidad de Concepción and Deportes Puerto Montt to reach the final against Cobreloa. The first leg ended 0–0 in Copiapó, but in the return match on 27 November the León de Atacama produced a historic 5–0 victory at the Estadio Zorros del Desierto in Calama. Maximiliano Quinteros scored a hat-trick, while Jorge Luna and Eduardo Puchetta added the remaining goals, securing the club's first promotion to the Primera División.

Copiapó made its Primera División debut in 2023, beginning the first top-flight campaign in the club's history. The team managed to preserve its status during its inaugural season and remained in the division for 2024.

The second campaign proved more difficult. Copiapó spent much of the 2024 season near the bottom of the table and was in last place from the twentieth round onward. Relegation was confirmed on 20 October after a 5–3 home defeat to Everton left the club bottom of the standings with 23 points, ending its two-season stay in Primera División.

Back in Primera B in 2025, Copiapó immediately challenged for promotion again. The club finished second in the regular-season standings with 52 points, three behind champions Universidad de Concepción, and qualified directly for the semi-finals of the promotion play-offs. Copiapó was eliminated by Deportes Concepción after losing the first leg 1–0 and drawing the return match 1–1, remaining in the second tier for the 2026 season.

== Current squad ==
As of 8 August 2026

Note: Flags indicate national team as defined under FIFA eligibility rules; some limited exceptions apply. Players may hold more than one non-FIFA nationality.

No.	Pos.	Nation	Player
1	GK	CHI	Richard Leyton
2	MF	CHI	Franco Kepec
3	DF	CHI	Nicolás Suárez (loan from Colo-Colo)
4	DF	CHI	Agustín Ortiz
5	DF	CHI	Fabián Torres (c)
6	MF	CHI	Claudio Zamorano
7	FW	CHI	Carlos Ross
8	MF	CHI	Axl Ríos
9	FW	ARG	Lautaro Palacios
10	MF	CHI	Iván Ledezma
11	MF	CHI	Jorge Ortiz (loan from Universidad Católica)
12	GK	CHI	Benjamin Arce
13	DF	CHI	Diego Opazo
14	FW	CHI	Damián Sáez
15	DF	CHI	John Santander

No.	Pos.	Nation	Player
16	MF	CHI	Sebastián Espinoza
17	DF	CHI	Nozomi Kimura (loan from Deportes Concepción)
18	FW	CHI	John Valladares
19	FW	CHI	Carlos Soza
20	DF	CHI	Marcelo Filla
21	MF	CHI	Enzo Fernández
22	GK	ARG	Nicolás Temperini
23	MF	CHI	Maximiliano Rojas
24	FW	CHI	Rodrigo Orellana
25	FW	CHI	Fabián Tabilo
26	MF	URU	Gastón Pérez
27	FW	ARG	Manuel López
28	FW	CHI	Francisco Espoz
29	DF	ARG	Salvador Sánchez
31	FW	CHI	Ignacio Fuenzalida (loan from Audax Italiano)

== Managers ==
- (Chile) Wilson Piñones and Rubén Sánchez (1999)
- (Chile) Jorge Rodríguez (2000)
- (Chile) Hernán Castro (2000-2001)
- (Chile) Gerardo Silva (2002-2003)
- (Chile) Rubén Sánchez (2004)
- (Chile) Manuel Soto (2004-2005)
- (Chile) Nelson Cossio (2006-2008)
- (Chile) Víctor Palma (2008)
- (Chile) Nelson Cossio (2009-2010)
- (Chile) Orlando Mondaca (2010)
- (Chile) Nelson Cossio (2010)
- (Chile) Cristián Castañeda (2011)
- (Chile) Hernán Ibarra (2011)
- (Chile) Gerardo Silva (2012-2013)
- (Chile) Rubén Sánchez (2013)
- (Chile) Marcelo Miranda (2013)
- (Chile) Rubén Sánchez (2013-2016)
- (Chile) Francisco Michea (2016)
- (Chile) Rubén Sánchez (2016-2017)
- (Chile) Erwin Durán (2017-2018)
- (Argentina) Héctor Almandoz (2018-2020)
- (Chile) Emiliano Astorga (2020-2021)
- (Chile) Erwin Durán (2021)
- (Chile) Rubén Sánchez (2021)
- (Argentina) Héctor Almandoz (2022-2023)
- (Chile) Ivo Basay (2023-2024)
- (Argentina) Hernán Caputto (2024-2025)
- (Argentina) Héctor Almandoz (2026)
- (Chile) Erwin Durán (2026-)

== Titles ==
- Tercera División: 1

2002
