= 2023 Copa Chile =

Copa Chile Easy 2023

Tournament details
- Country: Chile
- Dates: 8 March – 13 December 2023
- Teams: 74

Final positions
- Champions: Colo-Colo (14th title)
- Runners-up: Magallanes

Tournament statistics
- Matches played: 88
- Goals scored: 285 (3.24 per match)
- Top goal scorer(s): Rodrigo Auzmendi; Carlos Palacios (5 goals each)

The 2023 Copa Chile (officially known as Copa Chile Easy 2023 due to its sponsorship), was the 43rd edition of the Copa Chile, the country's national football cup tournament. The tournament began on 8 March and ended with the final on neutral ground on 13 December 2023.

Colo-Colo were the champions, winning their fourteenth Copa Chile title by beating the defending champions Magallanes in the final by a 3–1 score.

== Format ==
The 2023 Copa Chile is based on a system of direct elimination with double-legged ties, similar to the Copa del Rey. For this edition the competition had a format change, with clubs affiliated to ANFA (those from Tercera A, Tercera B and regional amateur leagues) being drawn into 13 ties in a first round, with the winners advancing to the newly implemented regional stage where teams from Primera División, Primera B, and Segunda División Profesional entered the competition. In the regional stage, the 64 participating teams were split into four geographical zones, in which they were drawn against a rival from their same zone. In each zone, four rounds were played: round of 16, quarter-finals, semi-finals, and the finals; the former three stages were played as single-legged ties, whilst the latter one was a double-legged series. The four regional winners then advanced to the national stage, where they played two semi-finals with their winners playing the final to decide the champion.

== Prizes ==
The champions of this edition were entitled to earn the right to compete in the 2024 Copa Libertadores taking the Chile 4 berth, provided they played in the Chilean Primera División in the 2024 season. In case they did not meet this requirement, they would be awarded a monetary prize and the Copa Libertadores berth would be passed to the Copa Chile runners-up, provided they also met the aforementioned condition. Since the champions Colo-Colo had already qualified for the Copa Libertadores through league performance, and the runners-up Magallanes were relegated from the top tier, the berth was reallocated to the 2023 Campeonato Nacional best team not yet qualified for the competition.

The champions also earned the right to play the 2024 Supercopa de Chile against the 2023 Campeonato Nacional champions, regardless of the tier they play in.

== Schedule ==
Round		Draw date	First leg	Second leg
First stage		16 February 2023	8–12 March 2023	17–19 March 2023
Regional stage	Round of 16	23 March 2023	1–12 April 2023	
Regional stage	Quarter-finals	23 March 2023	21 June – 12 July 2023	
Regional stage	Semi-finals	23 March 2023	1 July – 16 August 2023	
Regional stage	Finals	23 March 2023	27 July – 20 August 2023	15–23 August 2023
National stage	Semi-finals	23 March 2023	27 September 2023	4 October 2023
National stage	Final	23 March 2023	13 December 2023 (originally 20 December 2023)	

== Teams ==
76 clubs took part in this edition of the Copa Chile: 16 from the Primera División, 16 from the Primera B, 14 from the Segunda División Profesional, 14 from Tercera A, 1 from Tercera B, and 15 from regional amateur leagues. All of the clubs competing in Tercera A were invited to the competition, along with Tercera B side Aguará.

Primera A

- Audax Italiano
- Cobresal
- Colo-Colo
- Coquimbo Unido
- Curicó Unido
- Deportes Copiapó
- Everton
- Huachipato
- Magallanes
- Ñublense
- O'Higgins
- Palestino
- Unión Española
- Unión La Calera
- Universidad Católica
- Universidad de Chile

Primera B

- Barnechea
- Cobreloa
- Deportes Antofagasta
- Deportes Iquique
- Deportes La Serena
- Deportes Puerto Montt
- Deportes Recoleta
- Deportes Santa Cruz
- Deportes Temuco
- Rangers
- San Luis
- San Marcos de Arica
- Santiago Morning
- Santiago Wanderers
- Unión San Felipe
- Universidad de Concepción

Segunda División

- Deportes Concepción
- Deportes Limache
- Deportes Linares
- Deportes Melipilla
- Deportes Rengo
- Deportes Valdivia
- Fernández Vial
- General Velásquez
- Iberia
- Lautaro de Buin
- Provincial Osorno
- Real San Joaquín
- San Antonio Unido
- Trasandino

Tercera A

- Brujas de Salamanca
- Chimbarongo
- Colchagua
- Comunal Cabrero
- Concón National
- Deportes Colina
- Deportes Quillón
- ~~Municipal Mejillones~~
- Municipal Puente Alto
- Provincial Ovalle
- Provincial Ranco
- Quintero Unido
- Rancagua Sur
- Santiago City
- Unión Compañías

Tercera B

- Aguará

Regional amateur clubs

- Bories
- Constitución
- Eléctrico Refinería
- Ferroviario Comercial
- Gol y Gol
- Juventud Unida
- La Higuera
- Liga Universitaria
- Ojanco
- Población Nogales
- San Antonio Unido (Temuco)
- Teniente Merino
- Trasandino (Socoroma)
- Unión Bellavista
- Unión Iquique

== First stage ==
The pairings for the first stage were announced by the ANFA on 16 February 2023. The participating clubs were split into two groups, one of them made of 10 regional ANFA clubs and the other one featuring the Tercera División (A and B) teams. They were then drawn against a team in their group, according to geographical and safety criteria. Ties involving regional clubs were single-legged, while the ones involving Tercera División teams were played over two legs. Matches in this round were played from 8 to 19 March 2022.

Regional
Team 1	Score	Team 2
Unión Bellavista	6–0	La Higuera
Constitución	0–1	Ferroviario Comercial
San Antonio Unido (Temuco)	1–2	Teniente Merino
Juventud Unida	1–1 (3–5 p)	Gol y Gol
Liga Universitaria	1–1 (2–4 p)	Bories

Tercera División
Team 1	Agg.	Team 2	1st leg	2nd leg
Provincial Ovalle	7–1	Brujas de Salamanca	5–0	2–1
Quintero Unido	4–3	Concón National	1–0	3–3
Santiago City	11–2	Aguará	9–1	2–1
Municipal Puente Alto	0–4	Deportes Colina	0–3	0–1
Rancagua Sur	2–3	Chimbarongo	1–0	1–3
Deportes Quillón	1–4	Colchagua	1–4	0–0
Comunal Cabrero	3–1	Provincial Ranco	2–1	1–0
Unión Compañías	w/o	Municipal Mejillones	—	—

Notes

1. Unión Compañías won by walkover due to the withdrawal of Municipal Mejillones from the competition.

== Regional stage ==
The draw for the regional stage was held on 23 March 2023. The 64 participating teams were split into four zones (North, Central-North, Central-South, and South) and drawn against a team from their same regional zone. Ties in the round of 16, quarter-finals, and semi-finals were single-legged with the higher-seeded team hosting the match, except in the round of 16 in which the team from the lower division hosted it, whilst the regional finals are played over two legs.

=== North Zone ===
==== Bracket ====
Round of 16
64	Quintero Unido	1
11	Coquimbo Unido	4
66	Unión Compañías	1
25	Deportes La Serena	3
58	Unión Bellavista	1
15	Cobresal	5
46	Provincial Ovalle	1
29	Deportes Copiapó	2
Ojanco	0
12	Cobreloa	5
Eléctrico Refinería	1
13	Deportes Antofagasta	6
Unión Iquique	0
21	Deportes Iquique	5
120	Trasandino (Socoroma)	0
30	San Marcos de Arica	5

Quarter-finals
11	Coquimbo Unido (p)	1 (4)
25	Deportes La Serena	1 (2)
15	Cobresal	3
29	Deportes Copiapó	0
12	Cobreloa	2
13	Deportes Antofagasta	0
21	Deportes Iquique	0
30	San Marcos de Arica	4

Semi-finals
11	Coquimbo Unido	0
15	Cobresal	2
12	Cobreloa (p)	0 (4)
30	San Marcos de Arica	0 (2)

Finals
15	Cobresal	1	2	3
12	Cobreloa	3	4	7

==== Round of 16 ====
1 April 2023	Unión Compañías	1–3	Deportes La Serena	La Serena
16:00 UTC−3	Briones 45+3'	Report	Arias 6', 54'; Mederos 48'	Stadium: La Portada; Attendance: 1,885; Referee: Claudio Cevasco

7 April 2023	Unión Iquique	0–5	Deportes Iquique	Iquique
17:30 UTC−4		Report	Moya 44', 75'; Sanhueza 45+3'; Ramos 62'; Delgado 90'	Stadium: Tierra de Campeones; Referee: Juan Comas

7 April 2023	Ojanco	0–5	Cobreloa	Copiapó
20:00 UTC−4		Report	Jara 1'; Valdés 26'; Insaurralde 42'; Valdebenito 84' (o.g.); Villagrán 90+4'	Stadium: Luis Valenzuela Hermosilla; Referee: Gastón Philippe

8 April 2023	Provincial Ovalle	1–2	Deportes Copiapó	Punitaqui
16:00 UTC−4	Carrasco 80'	Report	Díaz 38'; Pontigo 57'	Stadium: Municipal; Referee: Cristián Galaz

8 April 2023	Trasandino (Socoroma)	0–5	San Marcos de Arica	Arica
18:00 UTC−4		Report	Auzmendi 27', 38', 65', 75'; Arias 69'	Stadium: Carlos Dittborn; Referee: Cristián Droguett

8 April 2023	Quintero Unido	1–4	Coquimbo Unido	La Calera
20:00 UTC−4	Beltrán 34'	Report	Carmona 26'; Palavecino 46'; Aravena 82'; Messina 90+12'	Stadium: Municipal Nicolás Chahuán Nazar; Referee: Franco Jiménez

9 April 2023	Unión Bellavista	1–5	Cobresal	Punitaqui
16:00 UTC−4	Herrera 45+3'	Report	Valencia 10'; Vásquez 12'; Céspedes 48'; García 80', 89'	Stadium: Municipal; Referee: Felipe Jara

9 April 2023	Eléctrico Refinería	1–6	Deportes Antofagasta	Calama
17:00 UTC−4	Díaz 3'	Report	Hurtado 16', 45+1', 72'; Bández 27'; Robles 71'; Álvarez 89'	Stadium: Zorros del Desierto; Referee: Francisco Soriano

==== Quarter-finals ====
22 June 2023	Cobresal	3–0	Deportes Copiapó	El Salvador
19:00 UTC−4	F. García 27'; Valencia 55', 68'	Report		Stadium: El Cobre; Referee: Gustavo Ahumada

24 June 2023	Coquimbo Unido	1–1 (4–2 p)	Deportes La Serena	Coquimbo
12:30 UTC−4	Palavecino 74'	Report	Dubó 54'	Stadium: Municipal Francisco Sánchez Rumoroso; Referee: Diego Flores
	Penalties
	Holgado (penalty scored); Palavecino (penalty scored); Cabral (penalty scored); Pavez (penalty scored)		(penalty scored) Paredes; (penalty missed) Guerrero; (penalty missed) Mederos; (penalty scored) Rodríguez

25 June 2023	Cobreloa	2–0	Deportes Antofagasta	Calama
17:30 UTC−4	Insaurralde 9'; Gotti 77' (pen.)	Report		Stadium: Zorros del Desierto; Attendance: 3,692; Referee: Juan Sepúlveda

26 June 2023	Deportes Iquique	0–4	San Marcos de Arica	Iquique
12:30 UTC−4		Report	Auzmendi 46'; Arguinarena 50'; Donadell 67'; Azócar 90'	Stadium: Tierra de Campeones; Referee: Miguel Araos

==== Semi-finals ====
1 July 2023	Cobreloa	0–0 (4–2 p)	San Marcos de Arica	Calama
15:30 UTC−4		Report		Stadium: Zorros del Desierto; Referee: Diego Flores
	Penalties
	Gauna (penalty scored); García (penalty scored); Gotti (penalty scored); Águila (penalty scored)		(penalty scored) Donadell; (penalty missed) Avello; (penalty missed) Azócar; (penalty scored) Monroy

16 August 2023	Coquimbo Unido	0–2	Cobresal	Coquimbo
20:30 UTC−4		Report	Lezcano 61'; Valencia 66' (pen.)	Stadium: Municipal Francisco Sánchez Rumoroso; Referee: Juan Lara

==== Finals ====
20 August 2023	Cobresal	1–3	Cobreloa	El Salvador
18:00 UTC−4	Ballini 66' (o.g.)	Report	Insaurralde 52'; Gotti 56'; Jara 90+6' (pen.)	Stadium: El Cobre; Referee: Manuel Vergara

23 August 2023	Cobreloa	4–2 (7–3 agg.)	Cobresal	Calama
18:30 UTC−4	Escalante 20' (pen.); Parra 27'; García 40'; Gotti 52'	Report	Waterman 31', 46'	Stadium: Zorros del Desierto; Referee: Diego Flores

=== Central–North Zone ===
==== Bracket ====
Round of 16
Deportes Colina	1 (2)
6	Universidad Católica (p)	1 (4)
53	Real San Joaquín	0
16	Santiago Wanderers	3
Población Nogales	1
7	Everton	7
22	Unión San Felipe (p)	1 (5)
26	San Luis	1 (3)
Santiago City	0
1	Colo-Colo	2
44	Trasandino	1 (3)
20	Unión La Calera (p)	1 (4)
42	Deportes Limache	1
9	Palestino	3
36	San Antonio Unido	0 (2)
23	Santiago Morning (p)	0 (4)

Quarter-finals
6	Universidad Católica	2
16	Santiago Wanderers	0
7	Everton	5
22	Unión San Felipe	1
1	Colo-Colo	6
20	Unión La Calera	1
9	Palestino	5
23	Santiago Morning	4

Semi-finals
6	Universidad Católica (p)	0 (5)
7	Everton	0 (4)
1	Colo-Colo	1
9	Palestino	0

Finals
6	Universidad Católica	0	0	0
1	Colo-Colo	0	1	1

==== Round of 16 ====
7 April 2023	Real San Joaquín	0–3	Santiago Wanderers	Valparaíso
17:00 UTC−4		Report	Muñoz 13'; Cañete 51' (pen.); Pereyra 79'	Stadium: Elías Figueroa Brander; Referee: Víctor Abarzúa

7 April 2023	Población Nogales	1–7	Everton	La Florida, Santiago
20:00 UTC−4	Pinto 90+3'	Report	Ramos 15'; Sáez 30'; Berríos 44'; Sosa 49'; Sánchez 63'; Echeverría 75'; Campos López 87'	Stadium: Bicentenario de La Florida; Referee: Diego Flores

8 April 2023	San Antonio Unido	0–0 (2–4 p)	Santiago Morning	Cartagena
16:00 UTC−4		Report		Stadium: Municipal; Referee: Manuel Vergara

8 April 2023	Deportes Colina	1–1 (2–4 p)	Universidad Católica	La Florida, Santiago
20:00 UTC−4	Arraño 10'	Report	Zampedri 90+7'	Stadium: Bicentenario de La Florida; Referee: Nicolás Millas

9 April 2023	Deportes Limache	1–3	Palestino	La Calera
15:00 UTC−4	Villarroel 23'	Report	Dávila 57', 87'; Salas 66'	Stadium: Municipal Nicolás Chahuán Nazar; Referee: Juan Lara

9 April 2023	Unión San Felipe	1–1 (5–3 p)	San Luis	San Felipe
15:00 UTC−4	Monreal 75'	Report	Sepúlveda 15'	Stadium: Municipal; Referee: Benjamín Saravia

9 April 2023	Santiago City	0–2	Colo-Colo	Macul, Santiago
18:30 UTC−4		Report	Palacios 8'; Bolados 89'	Stadium: Monumental David Arellano; Referee: Miguel Araos

10 April 2023	Trasandino	1–1 (3–4 p)	Unión La Calera	Los Andes
19:00 UTC−4	Cezar 80'	Report	Lomónaco 86'	Stadium: Regional de Los Andes; Referee: Cristián Droguett

==== Quarter-finals ====
22 June 2023	Palestino	5–4	Santiago Morning	La Cisterna, Santiago
15:00 UTC−4	Cornejo 23'; Dávila 36'; Salas 59', 63'; Barticciotto 84'	Report	De Hoyos 27', 56' (pen.); Manríquez 33' (pen.), 87'	Stadium: Municipal; Referee: Ángelo Hermosilla

1 July 2023	Everton	5–1	Unión San Felipe	Viña del Mar
18:00 UTC−4	Sáez 33', 68', 79'; Madrid 45+1'; Soto 90+3'	Report	Monreal 31'	Stadium: Sausalito; Referee: Héctor Jona
Note: Match originally scheduled for 24 June 2023, 16:00 local time but suspended due to bad weather. It was eventually rescheduled to 1 July 2023, 18:00 local time.

2 July 2023	Universidad Católica	2–0	Santiago Wanderers	Independencia, Santiago
18:00 UTC−4	Barboza 24' (o.g.); Aravena 74'	Report		Stadium: Santa Laura-Universidad SEK; Referee: Juan Lara
Note: Match originally scheduled for 23 June 2023, 19:00 local time but suspended due to heavy rainfall. It was eventually rescheduled to 2 July 2023, 18:00 local time.

4 July 2023	Colo-Colo	6–1	Unión La Calera	Macul, Santiago
19:00 UTC−4	Thompson 1', 37'; Palacios 24', 45', 66'; Lezcano 82' (pen.)	Report	Lomónaco 48'	Stadium: Monumental David Arellano; Referee: Víctor Abarzúa
Note: Match originally scheduled for 24 June 2023, 17:30 local time but suspended due to a water shutoff in Santiago. It was eventually rescheduled to 4 July 2023, 19:00 local time.

==== Semi-finals ====
2 August 2023	Colo-Colo	1–0	Palestino	Macul, Santiago
18:00 UTC−4	V. Pizarro 64'	Report		Stadium: Monumental David Arellano; Referee: Juan Sepúlveda

9 August 2023	Universidad Católica	0–0 (5–4 p)	Everton	Independencia, Santiago
20:30 UTC−4		Report		Stadium: Santa Laura-Universidad SEK; Referee: Diego Flores
	Penalties
	Zampedri (penalty scored); Rovira (penalty scored); Parot (penalty scored); Aravena (penalty scored); Di Santo (penalty scored)		(penalty scored) Montes; (penalty scored) Madrid; (penalty missed) Barroso; (penalty scored) Sáez; (penalty scored) Oyarzún

==== Finals ====
16 August 2023	Universidad Católica	0–0	Colo-Colo	Independencia, Santiago
18:00 UTC−4		Report		Stadium: Santa Laura-Universidad SEK; Referee: Francisco Gilabert

20 August 2023	Colo-Colo	1–0 (1–0 agg.)	Universidad Católica	Macul, Santiago
15:00 UTC−4	D. Pizarro 25'	Report		Stadium: Monumental David Arellano; Referee: José Cabero

=== Central–South Zone ===
==== Bracket ====
Round of 16
41	Deportes Recoleta	2
8	Audax Italiano	3
48	Deportes Rengo	1
18	Curicó Unido	0
Chimbarongo	0
2	Universidad de Chile	10
38	General Velásquez	1
14	O'Higgins	2
43	Colchagua	1
3	Unión Española	6
40	Lautaro de Buin	1
24	Barnechea	2
Ferroviario Comercial	0
5	Magallanes	6
35	Deportes Melipilla	0 (3)
37	Deportes Santa Cruz (p)	0 (4)

Quarter-finals
8	Audax Italiano	2
48	Deportes Rengo	1
2	Universidad de Chile	0 (3)
14	O'Higgins (p)	0 (5)
3	Unión Española	2
24	Barnechea	0
5	Magallanes	3
37	Deportes Santa Cruz	0

Semi-finals
8	Audax Italiano	0
14	O'Higgins	2
3	Unión Española	1
5	Magallanes	2

Finals
14	O'Higgins	3	1	4 (3)
5	Magallanes (p)	2	2	4 (5)

==== Round of 16 ====
8 April 2023	Deportes Melipilla	0–0 (3–4 p)	Deportes Santa Cruz	Melipilla
15:00 UTC−4		Report		Stadium: Soinca Bata; Referee: Jorge Oses

8 April 2023	General Velásquez	1–2	O'Higgins	Rancagua
17:30 UTC−4	Cisternas 66'	Report	Moreira 3'; Belmar 15'	Stadium: El Teniente; Attendance: 1,566; Referee: Francisco Gilabert

9 April 2023	Ferroviario Comercial	0–6	Magallanes	San Vicente de Tagua Tagua
13:30 UTC−4		Report	Cadenazzi 4', 27' (pen.); Vicuña 16'; Quiroz 21'; Souper 83'; Barría 88'	Stadium: Municipal Augusto Rodríguez; Referee: Óscar Ávila

9 April 2023	Deportes Recoleta	2–3	Audax Italiano	Recoleta, Santiago
15:00 UTC−4	Ojeda 26'; Carvajal 43'	Report	Hachen 36'; Sosa 55'; Riveros 56'	Stadium: Municipal Leonel Sánchez; Referee: Piero Maza

9 April 2023	Chimbarongo	0–10	Universidad de Chile	Valparaíso
16:00 UTC−4		Report	Guerra 9', 42'; Palacios 25'; Assadi 35'; Mateos 41'; Zaldivia 44'; Andía 55'; Casanova 68'; Huerta 85'; Morales 89'	Stadium: Elías Figueroa Brander; Referee: Matías Quila

9 April 2023	Colchagua	1–6	Unión Española	San Fernando
18:00 UTC−4	Roa 75'	Report	Tiznado 36'; Norambuena 72'; Galdames 84'; Carvallo 89'; Garate 90'; Núñez 90+6'	Stadium: Municipal Jorge Silva Valenzuela; Referee: José Cabero

10 April 2023	Deportes Rengo	1–0	Curicó Unido	San Fernando
17:00 UTC−4	Droguett 13'	Report		Stadium: Municipal Jorge Silva Valenzuela; Referee: Matías Assadi

12 April 2023	Lautaro de Buin	1–2	Barnechea	La Pintana, Santiago
16:00 UTC−4	Cuéllar 51' (pen.)	Report	Sagredo 34'; Salaberry 82'	Stadium: Municipal; Referee: Nicolás Pozo

==== Quarter-finals ====
21 June 2023	Universidad de Chile	0–0 (3–5 p)	O'Higgins	Independencia, Santiago
19:00 UTC−4		Report		Stadium: Santa Laura-Universidad SEK; Attendance: 12,346; Referee: Nicolás Millas
	Penalties
	Domínguez (penalty scored); Zaldivia (penalty scored); Fuentealba (penalty scored); Guerra (penalty missed)		(penalty scored) Marín; (penalty scored) Hernández; (penalty scored) González; (penalty scored) Torrealba; (penalty scored) Hormazábal

22 June 2023	Audax Italiano	2–1	Deportes Rengo	La Florida, Santiago
19:00 UTC−4	Monreal 26'; Fuentes 47'	Report	R. Díaz 77'	Stadium: Bicentenario; Referee: Cristian Droguett

30 June 2023	Unión Española	2–0	Barnechea	Independencia, Santiago
19:00 UTC−4	Garate 31' (pen.); Yáñez 49' (pen.)	Report		Stadium: Santa Laura-Universidad SEK; Attendance: 1,485; Referee: Reinerio Alvarado
Note: Match originally scheduled for 25 June 2023, 19:00 local time but suspended due to bad weather. It was eventually rescheduled to 30 June 2023, 19:00 local time.

12 July 2023	Magallanes	3–0	Deportes Santa Cruz	San Bernardo, Santiago
15:00 UTC−4	Jorquera 26'; Jones 44'; Larrivey 45+1'	Report		Stadium: Municipal Luis Navarro Avilés; Referee: Felipe Jara

==== Semi-finals ====
3 July 2023	Audax Italiano	0–2	O'Higgins	La Florida, Santiago
19:00 UTC−4		Report	Belmar 15'; Moreira 66'	Stadium: Bicentenario; Referee: Piero Maza

2 August 2023	Unión Española	1–2	Magallanes	Independencia, Santiago
20:30 UTC−4	Norambuena 32'	Report	Jones 17'; Jorquera 45'	Stadium: Santa Laura-Universidad SEK; Referee: Nicolás Millas

==== Finals ====
15 August 2023	O'Higgins	3–2	Magallanes	Rancagua
15:00 UTC−4	Moreira 18'; Fuentes 37'; A. Castillo 63'	Report	Canales 65'; Jorquera 79'	Stadium: El Teniente; Referee: Felipe González

19 August 2023	Magallanes	2–1 (4–4 agg.) (5–3 p)	O'Higgins	San Bernardo, Santiago
15:00 UTC−4	Larrivey 32'; Flores 86'	Report	Moreira 7'	Stadium: Municipal Luis Navarro Avilés; Attendance: 842; Referee: Piero Maza
	Penalties
	Larrivey (penalty scored); Villanueva (penalty scored); Acevedo (penalty scored); Flores (penalty scored); Alfaro (penalty scored)		(penalty missed) Blando; (penalty scored) M. González; (penalty scored) Díaz; (penalty scored) Moya

=== South Zone ===
==== Bracket ====
Round of 16
Teniente Merino	1
4	Huachipato	3
Gol y Gol	0
19	Deportes Temuco	2
Bories	0
27	Deportes Puerto Montt	3
32	Deportes Valdivia	0 (6)
55	Provincial Osorno (p)	0 (7)
31	Iberia	0
17	Universidad de Concepción	2
33	Fernández Vial (p)	1 (4)
34	Deportes Concepción	1 (2)
57	Deportes Linares	1
28	Rangers	2
Comunal Cabrero	3
10	Ñublense	0

Quarter-finals
4	Huachipato	2 (3)
19	Deportes Temuco (p)	2 (4)
27	Deportes Puerto Montt	1
55	Provincial Osorno	0
17	Universidad de Concepción	1
33	Fernández Vial	0
28	Rangers	1
Comunal Cabrero	0

Semi-finals
19	Deportes Temuco	3
27	Deportes Puerto Montt	0
17	Universidad de Concepción	2
28	Rangers	0

Finals
19	Deportes Temuco	0	2	2
17	Universidad de Concepción	3	1	4

==== Round of 16 ====
7 April 2023	Bories	0–3	Deportes Puerto Montt	Puerto Natales
13:30 UTC−3		Report	Soza 23'; Soto 60'; Ruíz 70'	Stadium: Municipal Víctor Bórquez; Referee: Héctor Jona

7 April 2023	Fernández Vial	1–1 (4–2 p)	Deportes Concepción	Concepción
15:00 UTC−4	Gillard 90+6'	Report	Fredes 72'	Stadium: Ester Roa; Attendance: 11,619; Referee: Cristian Garay

8 April 2023	Deportes Valdivia	2–2 (6–7 p)	Provincial Osorno	Valdivia
15:00 UTC−4	Neira 61'; Melivilú 79'	Report	Bielkiewicz 13' (pen.), 68' (pen.)	Stadium: Parque Municipal; Attendance: 1,699; Referee: Rodrigo Carvajal

8 April 2023	Deportes Linares	1–2	Rangers	Linares
16:00 UTC−4	Díaz 57'	Report	Altamirano 8'; Ábalos 80'	Stadium: Fiscal Tucapel Bustamante; Referee: Juan Sepúlveda

8 April 2023	Iberia	0–2	Universidad de Concepción	Los Ángeles
19:30 UTC−4		Report	Islame 47', 90+6'	Stadium: Municipal; Referee: Emerson Domínguez

9 April 2023	Comunal Cabrero	3–0; Awarded	Ñublense	Monte Águila
15:00 UTC−4		Report	Vilches 37'; Guerrero 61' (pen.); Martínez 76'	Stadium: Municipal; Referee: Fabián Reyes
Note: Match awarded to Comunal Cabrero due to Ñublense fielding an ineligible player. It had originally ended with Ñublense winning 3–0.

9 April 2023	Teniente Merino	1–3	Huachipato	Concepción
15:00 UTC−4	Baeza 77'	Report	Huanca 16'; Torres 44'; Acosta 78'	Stadium: Ester Roa; Referee: Fernando Véjar

9 April 2023	Gol y Gol	0–2	Deportes Temuco	Río Bueno
16:00 UTC−4		Report	Salinas 64'; Sáez 90+1'	Stadium: Municipal Edmundo Larre Bollmann; Referee: Mathías Riquelme

==== Quarter-finals ====
25 June 2023	Deportes Puerto Montt	1–0	Provincial Osorno	Puerto Montt
15:00 UTC−4	Ramírez 49'	Report		Stadium: Regional de Chinquihue; Referee: Jorge Oses

28 June 2023	Huachipato	2–2 (3–4 p)	Deportes Temuco	Talcahuano
18:00 UTC−4	Huanca 45+2'; C. Torres 71'	Report	Acevedo 23'; Zamorano 90+6'	Stadium: Huachipato-CAP Acero; Attendance: 1,848; Referee: Matías Quila
	Penalties
	Montes (penalty missed); Castillo (penalty scored); Martínez (penalty scored); Lobos (penalty scored); Rodríguez (penalty missed)		(penalty missed) González; (penalty scored) Acevedo; (penalty scored) D. Torres; (penalty scored) Salinas; (penalty scored) Urra

2 July 2023	Universidad de Concepción	1–0	Fernández Vial	Concepción
12:30 UTC−4	Gallegos 60'	Report		Stadium: Ester Roa; Attendance: 1,720; Referee: Nicolás Gamboa
Note: Match originally scheduled for 25 June 2023, 16:00 local time but suspended due to bad weather. It was eventually rescheduled to 2 July 2023, 12:30 local time.

4 July 2023	Rangers	1–0	Comunal Cabrero	Talca
16:00 UTC−4	Caroca 9'	Report		Stadium: Fiscal; Attendance: 1,079; Referee: Francisco Gaggero
Note: Match originally scheduled for 25 June 2023, 16:00 local time but suspended due to bad weather. It was eventually rescheduled to 4 July 2023, 16:00 local time.

==== Semi-finals ====
2 July 2023	Deportes Temuco	3–0	Deportes Puerto Montt	Temuco
15:00 UTC−4	Acevedo 24'; M. González 45'; Márquez 70'	Report		Stadium: Municipal Germán Becker; Referee: Cristian Garay

18 July 2023	Universidad de Concepción	2–0	Rangers	Concepción
19:00 UTC−4	Orellana 39'; Molina 90+9'	Report		Stadium: Ester Roa; Referee: Gustavo Ahumada

==== Finals ====
27 July 2023	Deportes Temuco	0–3	Universidad de Concepción	Temuco
19:00 UTC−4		Report	Astudillo 38'; Saldías 49'; Ortiz 88'	Stadium: Municipal Germán Becker; Referee: Juan Sepúlveda

15 August 2023	Universidad de Concepción	1–2 (4–2 agg.)	Deportes Temuco	Concepción
17:30 UTC−4	Ibáñez 59'	Report	Acevedo 55', 73'	Stadium: Ester Roa; Referee: Nicolás Gamboa

== National stage ==
The national stage was played by the four regional winners, which played two double-legged semi-finals. The winners faced each other in the single-match final to decide the champions.

=== Bracket ===
Semi-finals
12	Cobreloa	2	0	2
1	Colo-Colo	2	1	3
17	Universidad de Concepción	1	2	3
5	Magallanes	3	1	4

Final
1	Colo-Colo	3
5	Magallanes	1

=== Semi-finals ===
Team 1	Agg.	Team 2	1st leg	2nd leg
Cobreloa	2–3	Colo-Colo	2–2	0–1
Universidad de Concepción	3–4	Magallanes	1–3	2–1

==== First leg ====
27 September 2023	Cobreloa	2–2	Colo-Colo	Calama
18:00 UTC−3	Escalante 18'; Insaurralde 71' (pen.)	Report	Palacios 30'; Gil 65' (pen.)	Stadium: Zorros del Desierto; Referee: Héctor Jona

27 September 2023	Universidad de Concepción	1–3	Magallanes	Concepción
20:30 UTC−3	Ahumada 58'	Report	Vicuña 35'; Jones 44' (pen.); Quiroz 90+4'	Stadium: Ester Roa; Attendance: 1,070; Referee: Fernando Véjar

==== Second leg ====
4 October 2023	Magallanes	1–2 (4–3 agg.)	Universidad de Concepción	San Bernardo, Santiago
15:30 UTC−3	Barría 23'	Report	Olivares 12'; Bogmis 73'	Stadium: Municipal Luis Navarro Avilés; Referee: Cristian Garay

4 October 2023	Colo-Colo	1–0 (3–2 agg.)	Cobreloa	Macul, Santiago
19:00 UTC−3	Falcón 81'	Report		Stadium: Monumental David Arellano; Referee: José Cabero

=== Final ===
13 December 2023
19:00 UTC−3

Colo-Colo	3–1	Magallanes
Amor 17'; Wiemberg 38'; V. Pizarro 58'	Report	Larrivey 14' (pen.)

Estadio Tierra de Campeones, Iquique
Referee: Cristian Garay

== Top scorers ==
Rank	Name	Club	Goals
1	(Argentina) Rodrigo Auzmendi	San Marcos de Arica	5
1	(Chile) Carlos Palacios	Colo-Colo	5
3	(Uruguay) Luis Acevedo	Deportes Temuco	4
3	(Chile) Leonardo Valencia	Cobresal	4
3	(Chile) Esteban Moreira	O'Higgins	4

Source: Campeonato Chileno

== See also ==
- 2023 Chilean Primera División
- 2023 Primera B de Chile
- 2023 Supercopa de Chile
