= 2025 Liga de Ascenso =

Liga de Ascenso Caixun
- Season: 2025
- Dates: 21 February – 7 December 2025
- Champions: Universidad de Concepción (2nd title)
- Promoted: Universidad de Concepción; Deportes Concepción
- Relegated: Santiago Morning
- Matches: 252
- Goals: 597 (2.37 per match)
- Top goalscorer: Tobías Figueroa (17 goals)
- Biggest home win: Dep. Antofagasta 5–0 Magallanes (15 June)
- Biggest away win: Dep. Santa Cruz 0–3 Rangers (23 February); S. Morning 0–3 Dep. Concepción (27 April); U. de Concepción 0–3 S. Wanderers (12 July); Dep. Concepción 1–4 U. de Concepción (24 August); Dep. Santa Cruz 0–3 Magallanes (7 September)
- Highest scoring: Curicó Unido 5–3 San Marcos (12 July)

The 2025 Primera B de Chile, also known as Liga de Ascenso Caixun 2025 due to sponsorship by electronics manufacturer Caixun, was the 71st season of the Primera B de Chile, Chile's second-tier football league. The regular season began on 21 February and ended on 2 November, with the second leg of the promotion play-off finals played as the final match of the season on 7 December 2025.

Universidad de Concepción were the champions, clinching their second Primera B title as well as promotion to the top flight with a 3–0 victory over Deportes Copiapó on 1 November, on the final matchday of the regular season. Deportes Concepción was the other team promoted to the Liga de Primera at the end of the season, after defeating Cobreloa in the promotion play-off finals.

== Format ==
The competition was played under the same format used in the most recent seasons, with a regular stage and a play-off tournament (known as Liguilla). In the regular season, the 16 participating teams played each other in a double round-robin tournament (once at home and once away) for a total of 30 matches, with the top team at the end of the 30 rounds winning the championship as well as promotion to the Liga de Primera for the following season. The teams placing from second to eighth place at the end of the regular season entered the Liguilla to decide the second promoted team, in which the regular season runners-up received a bye to the semi-finals. The team placing last at the end of the regular season was relegated to Segunda División Profesional.

== Teams ==
Locations of the 2025 Primera B de Chile teams
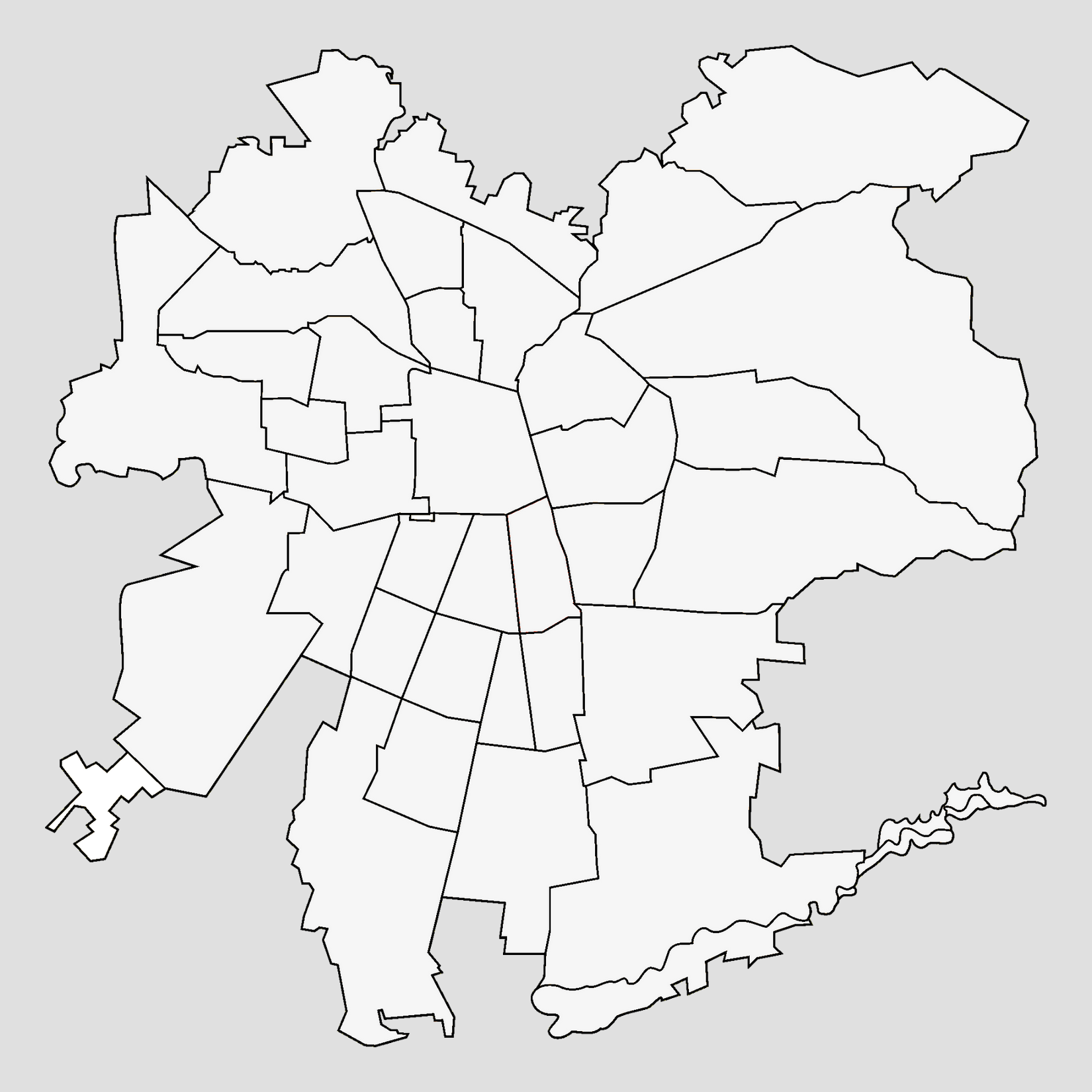
Locations of the 2025 Primera B de Chile teams in Santiago.

The tournament was played by 16 teams, 13 of them returning from the previous season, two relegated from the 2024 Campeonato Nacional (Cobreloa and Deportes Copiapó), and the 2024 Segunda División Profesional champions Deportes Concepción, who returned to the second tier after nine years following their disaffiliation from the ANFP in 2016. These teams replaced Deportes La Serena and Deportes Limache, who were promoted to the 2025 Liga de Primera, as well as Barnechea, relegated to Segunda División for this season.

Deportes Concepción's promotion to Primera B was only confirmed on 31 January 2025, after a ruling by the Second Chamber of the Disciplinary Court upheld a three-point deduction for Deportes Melipilla in the 2024 Segunda División Profesional standings, leaving Deportes Concepción as Segunda División champions. Deportes Concepción were ratified as champions by the ANFP on 4 February, greenliting the club's participation in the competition.

=== Stadia and locations ===
Club	City	Stadium	Capacity
Cobreloa	Calama	Zorros del Desierto	12,102
Curicó Unido	Curicó	La Granja (Note: Curicó Unido played their home matches at Estadio Municipal Joaquín Muñoz García in Santa Cruz and Estadio Municipal in Molina since their regular stadium Estadio La Granja in Curicó was closed for expansion works.)	8,278
Deportes Antofagasta	Antofagasta	Regional de Antofagasta	21,178
Deportes Concepción	Concepción	Ester Roa Rebolledo	30,448
Deportes Copiapó	Copiapó	Luis Valenzuela Hermosilla	8,000
Deportes Recoleta	Santiago (Recoleta)	Municipal Leonel Sánchez Lineros	1,000
Deportes Santa Cruz	Santa Cruz	Joaquín Muñoz García	5,000
Deportes Temuco	Temuco	Municipal Germán Becker	18,413
Magallanes	Santiago (San Bernardo)	Municipal Luis Navarro Avilés	3,500
Rangers	Talca	Fiscal de Talca (Note: Rangers and Santiago Wanderers played most of their home matches in this season at Estadio Fiscal Tucapel Bustamante in Linares, Estadio Fiscal Manuel Moya Medel in Cauquenes and Estadio Municipal Lucio Fariña Fernández in Quillota since Estadio Fiscal de Talca and Estadio Elías Figueroa Brander were refurbished to host the 2025 FIFA U-20 World Cup.)	16,070
San Luis	Quillota	Municipal Lucio Fariña Fernández	7,680
San Marcos de Arica	Arica	Carlos Dittborn	10,000
Santiago Morning	Santiago (La Pintana)	Municipal de La Pintana	6,000
Santiago Wanderers	Valparaíso	Elías Figueroa Brander	20,575
Unión San Felipe	San Felipe	Municipal de San Felipe	12,000
Universidad de Concepción	Concepción	Ester Roa Rebolledo	30,448

== Standings ==
Pos	Team	Pld	W	D	L	GF	GA	GD	Pts	Qualification or relegation
1	Universidad de Concepción (C, P)	30	17	4	9	41	26	+15	55	Promotion to Primera División
2	Deportes Copiapó	30	14	10	6	38	20	+18	52	Advance to Promotion play-off semi-finals
3	Cobreloa	30	14	8	8	44	42	+2	50	Advance to Promotion play-off quarter-finals
4	San Marcos de Arica	30	14	6	10	39	35	+4	48	Advance to Promotion play-off quarter-finals
5	Deportes Antofagasta	30	11	10	9	43	33	+10	43	Advance to Promotion play-off quarter-finals
6	Deportes Concepción (O, P)	30	12	7	11	42	38	+4	43	Advance to Promotion play-off quarter-finals
7	Rangers	30	10	13	7	35	35	0	43	Advance to Promotion play-off quarter-finals
8	Santiago Wanderers	30	10	11	9	41	37	+4	41	Advance to Promotion play-off quarter-finals
9	San Luis	30	9	12	9	30	35	−5	39	
10	Magallanes	30	9	8	13	28	33	−5	35	
11	Deportes Recoleta	30	8	11	11	28	37	−9	35	
12	Deportes Temuco	30	7	12	11	34	39	−5	33	
13	Curicó Unido	30	7	10	13	32	39	−7	31	
14	Deportes Santa Cruz	30	7	10	13	30	39	−9	31	
15	Unión San Felipe	30	8	6	16	30	38	−8	30	
16	Santiago Morning (Note: Santiago Morning were deducted three points as punishment for failing to report the payment of social security contributions for their footballers in October 2024 and a further six points for second offense, having also failed to report the payment of social security contributions in November 2024.) (R)	30	10	8	12	27	36	−9	29	Relegation to Segunda División Profesional

Source: Campeonato Chileno, Soccerway
Rules for classification: 1) Points, 2) Goal difference, 3) Matches won, 4) Goals for, 5) Away goals for, 6) Red cards, 7) Yellow cards, 8) Drawing of lots, 9) Play-off game (only if needed to decide championship).
If needed to decide championship between two teams: 2) Play-off game.
(C) Champions; (O) Play-off winners; (P) Promoted; (R) Relegated

== Results ==
Home \ Away	COB	CUR	ANT	DCO	CDC	REC	DSC	TEM	MAG	RAN	SLQ	SMA	SM	SW	USF	UDC
Cobreloa	—	3–2	4–2	2–1	1–1	4–0	1–1	2–1	2–0	4–1	1–1	2–0	0–1	2–0	1–1	0–2
Curicó Unido	0–2	—	1–0	2–3	1–1	1–1	2–3	1–1	1–1	0–1	1–3	5–3	0–1	1–0	3–0	1–2
Deportes Antofagasta	3–0	0–2	—	3–1	1–0	0–0	1–1	0–0	5–0	1–1	1–2	2–3	4–0	4–1	2–2	3–0
Deportes Concepción	4–0	0–0	0–0	—	2–0	0–1	1–0	2–2	2–1	1–2	2–2	1–0	4–1	0–0	2–1	1–4
Deportes Copiapó	1–1	1–1	1–1	2–1	—	3–0	2–0	3–0	2–0	3–0	3–0	3–1	2–2	3–0	0–0	0–3
Deportes Recoleta	0–1	1–1	1–2	2–3	0–1	—	3–2	2–2	2–0	2–3	3–1	0–0	1–0	1–1	2–1	1–0
Deportes Santa Cruz	1–2	2–0	3–0	2–0	0–1	0–0	—	2–0	0–3	0–3	2–2	1–0	0–2	2–2	1–1	1–2
Deportes Temuco	2–0	0–0	2–2	2–1	2–2	3–0	0–0	—	3–0	1–1	0–1	1–3	2–1	0–2	2–1	0–0
Magallanes	3–4	0–0	1–0	0–0	0–1	3–0	3–0	2–0	—	1–1	1–0	0–1	0–1	0–0	2–0	1–2
Rangers	1–1	0–1	2–1	1–0	0–0	1–1	2–2	2–3	0–0	—	2–2	1–2	0–0	3–3	2–1	0–1
San Luis	1–1	1–0	0–0	0–2	0–0	0–0	1–1	1–1	0–1	1–2	—	1–1	0–0	3–2	2–1	1–0
San Marcos de Arica	1–1	1–2	0–0	3–0	0–1	2–1	2–1	0–0	2–2	3–0	2–1	—	2–1	1–2	1–0	1–0
Santiago Morning	3–0	0–0	1–1	0–3	1–0	0–2	0–1	2–1	0–0	0–1	3–0	0–1	—	1–1	2–1	0–0
Santiago Wanderers	5–1	2–1	4–0	2–2	1–0	1–1	1–1	2–1	1–2	0–0	0–1	1–0	2–3	—	1–3	0–0
Unión San Felipe	3–0	4–2	0–2	2–1	0–1	0–0	0–0	1–0	1–0	0–2	1–0	1–2	2–0	0–1	—	1–2
Universidad de Concepción	0–1	2–0	0–1	1–2	1–0	1–0	1–0	3–2	2–1	0–0	1–2	4–1	5–1	0–3	2–1	—

Source: Campeonato Chileno, Soccerway
Legend: Blue = home team win; Yellow = draw; Red = away team win.

== Promotion play-off ==
The teams placed from second to eighth place in the regular season played a knockout competition (Liguilla) with the regular season runner-up getting a bye to the semi-finals. The winning side claimed the last promotion spot to the Liga de Primera for the next season.

=== Bracket ===
Quarter-finals
6	Deportes Concepción	2	1	3
5	Deportes Antofagasta	1	1	2
7	Rangers	0	0	0
4	San Marcos de Arica	2	1	3
8	Santiago Wanderers	2	2	4 (3)
3	Cobreloa (p)	2	2	4 (4)

Semi-finals
6	Deportes Concepción	1	1	2
2	Deportes Copiapó	0	1	1
4	San Marcos de Arica	2	1	3
3	Cobreloa	1	3	4

Finals
6	Deportes Concepción	1	3	4
3	Cobreloa	1	2	3

=== Quarter-finals ===
19 November 2025
20:00 UTC−3

Santiago Wanderers	2–2	Cobreloa
E. Espinoza 45+1'; Navarrete 61' (o.g.)	Report	Valdés 49'; Heredia 80'

Estadio Elías Figueroa Brander, Valparaíso
Referee: Gastón Philippe
23 November 2025
18:00 UTC−3

Cobreloa	2–2	Santiago Wanderers
Jara 45+4' (pen.); Delgado 90'	Report	E. Espinoza 39', 80'
Penalties
Provoste (penalty scored); Jara (penalty scored); Delgado (penalty scored); Zúñiga (penalty missed); D. Tapia (penalty scored)	4–3	(penalty scored) Navarro; (penalty scored) Parra; (penalty missed) Astroza; (penalty scored) Pereyra; (penalty missed) Miranda

Estadio Zorros del Desierto, Calama
Referee: Nicolás Gamboa

Tied 4–4 on aggregate. Cobreloa won on penalties.

18 November 2025
20:30 UTC−3

Rangers	0–2	San Marcos de Arica
	Report	Rivera 45+2'; Plaza 90+3'

Estadio Bicentenario Iván Azócar Bernales, Talca
Referee: Mathías Riquelme
23 November 2025
12:00 UTC−3

San Marcos de Arica	1–0	Rangers
Melivilú 67'	Report

Estadio Carlos Dittborn, Arica
Referee: Felipe González

San Marcos de Arica won 3–0 on aggregate.

18 November 2025
18:00 UTC−3

Deportes Concepción	2–1	Deportes Antofagasta
Larrivey 34', 38' (pen.)	Report	Souper 25' (pen.)

Estadio Ester Roa, Concepción
Referee: Franco Jiménez
23 November 2025
12:00 UTC−3

Deportes Antofagasta	1–1	Deportes Concepción
Souper 61'	Report	Larrivey 49'

Estadio Regional Calvo y Bascuñán, Antofagasta
Referee: Gastón Philippe

Deportes Concepción won 3–2 on aggregate.

=== Semi-finals ===
26 November 2025
20:30 UTC−3

Deportes Concepción	1–0	Deportes Copiapó
Larrivey 60' (pen.)	Report

Estadio Ester Roa, Concepción
Referee: Claudio Díaz
30 November 2025
20:30 UTC−3

Deportes Copiapó	1–1	Deportes Concepción
Salomón 14'	Report	Larrivey 70'

Estadio Luis Valenzuela Hermosilla, Copiapó
Referee: Franco Jiménez

Deportes Concepción won 2–1 on aggregate.

26 November 2025
18:00 UTC−3

San Marcos de Arica	2–1	Cobreloa
Ábalos 44'; Fernández 90+3' (pen.)	Report	Gotti 55'

Estadio Carlos Dittborn, Arica
Referee: Franco Jiménez
30 November 2025
20:30 UTC−3

Cobreloa	3–1	San Marcos de Arica
Jara 31' (pen.), 41'; Navarrete 36'	Report	Barrios 65'

Estadio Zorros del Desierto, Calama
Referee: Héctor Jona

Cobreloa won 4–3 on aggregate.

=== Finals ===
3 December 2025
20:00 UTC−3

Deportes Concepción	1–1	Cobreloa
Cáceres 53'	Report	Ledezma 66'

Estadio Ester Roa, Concepción
Referee: Juan Lara
7 December 2025
20:15 UTC−3

Cobreloa	2–3	Deportes Concepción
Gotti 77'; Delgado 84' (pen.)	Report	Sepúlveda 37', 90+6'; Larrivey 52'

Estadio Zorros del Desierto, Calama
Referee: Diego Flores

Deportes Concepción won 4–3 on aggregate and promoted to the Liga de Primera.

== Top scorers ==
Rank	Player	Club	Goals
1	(Argentina) Tobías Figueroa	Deportes Antofagasta	17
2	(Chile) Thomas Jones	Deportes Copiapó	13
2	(Argentina) Joaquín Larrivey	Deportes Concepción	13
2	(Chile) Camilo Melivilú	San Marcos de Arica	13
5	(Chile) Iam González	Universidad de Concepción	12
5	(Argentina) Gustavo Gotti	Cobreloa	12
7	(Uruguay) Marcos Camarda	San Marcos de Arica	11
8	(Chile) Isaac Díaz	Rangers	10
8	(Uruguay) Luis Acevedo	Deportes Temuco	10
10	(Chile) Aldrix Jara	Cobreloa	9
10	(Argentina) Ángel Gillard	Deportes Concepción	9

Source: Besoccer

== See also ==
- 2025 Liga de Primera
- 2025 Copa Chile
- 2025 Supercopa de Chile
