= 2026 Liga de Ascenso =

Liga de Ascenso Caixun
- Season: 2026
- Dates: 20 February – December 2026
- Champions: Cobreloa (2nd title)
- Promoted: Cobreloa
- Relegated: Rangers
- Matches: 244
- Goals: 645 (2.64 per match)
- Top goalscorer: Gustavo Gotti (21 goals)
- Biggest home win: Dep. Iquique 5–0 Unión San Felipe (21 February); Dep. Temuco 5–0 Unión San Felipe (23 May); Cobreloa 6–1 Dep. Recoleta (17 October)
- Biggest away win: Dep. Recoleta 1–5 Dep. Temuco (27 March); Dep. Pto. Montt 0–4 Dep. Iquique (22 August); Dep. Copiapó 0–4 Dep. Antofagasta (30 August)
- Highest scoring: Magallanes 4–3 Dep. Iquique (31 May); Dep. Temuco 3–4 Magallanes (8 August); Cobreloa 6–1 Dep. Recoleta (17 October); Unión San Felipe 3–4 Unión Española (15 November)
- All statistics correct as of 22 November 2026.

The 2026 Primera B de Chile, officially known as Liga de Ascenso Caixun 2026 for sponsorship reasons, is the 72nd season of the second-tier football league of Chile. The season, which is the second edition under the Liga de Ascenso branding, began on 20 February 2026. The champions and the winners of the promotion play-offs will be promoted to the Liga de Primera for the following season.

Cobreloa won their second Primera B title in this season and became the first team to earn promotion to the top-tier league, after defeating San Luis on penalty kicks following a scoreless draw in the promotion final match held on 21 November 2026.

== Format ==
For the 2026 season, the competition kept the format used in its most recent editions, featuring a regular stage and a promotion play-off tournament (Liguilla). In the regular stage, the 16 teams played a double round-robin tournament facing each other twice (once at home and once away). The team finishing first at the end of the 30 rounds will be crowned champion and will also promote to the 2027 Liga de Primera, while the next best seven teams qualified for the promotion play-offs, where they will compete in a knockout stage to determine the second promoted team. The regular season's runner-up will receive a bye to the semi-finals, while the remaining six teams will enter the play-offs in the first round. The team finishing last in the regular stage was relegated to the Segunda División Profesional for the 2027 season.

== Teams ==
Locations of the 2026 Liga de Ascenso teams
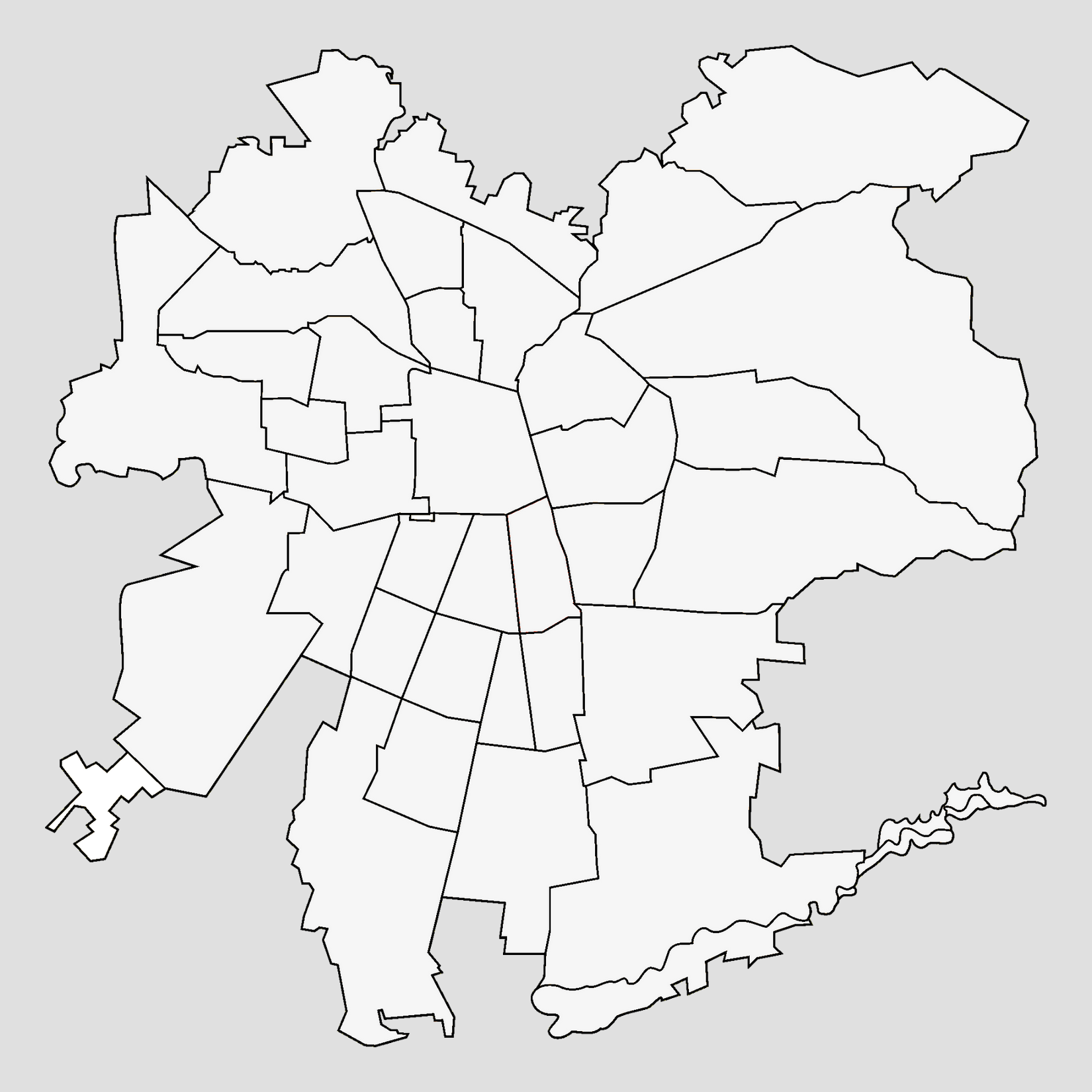
Locations of the 2026 Liga de Ascenso teams in Santiago.

Sixteen teams take part in the competition, thirteen of them returning from the previous season. Universidad de Concepción and Deportes Concepción were promoted to the top flight at the end of the 2025 season, being replaced in the second-tier competition by Unión Española and Deportes Iquique, both relegated from the 2025 Liga de Primera. The former team was relegated to the second tier for the first time since 1998, whilst the latter one returned to the Liga de Ascenso after two years.

The 2025 Segunda División Profesional champions Deportes Puerto Montt were promoted to the Liga de Ascenso for this season, returning after a two-year absence. They replaced Santiago Morning, who were relegated to the third tier for the first time after finishing last in the 2025 season.

=== Stadiums and locations ===
Club	City	Stadium	Capacity
Cobreloa	Calama	Zorros del Desierto	12,102
Curicó Unido	Curicó	La Granja	12,000
Deportes Antofagasta	Antofagasta	Calvo y Bascuñán	21,178
Deportes Copiapó	Copiapó	Luis Valenzuela Hermosilla	8,600
Deportes Iquique	Iquique	Tierra de Campeones	14,430
Deportes Puerto Montt	Puerto Montt	Regional de Chinquihue	10,000
Deportes Recoleta	Santiago (Recoleta)	Municipal Leonel Sánchez Lineros	2,000
Deportes Santa Cruz	Santa Cruz	Joaquín Muñoz García	4,500
Deportes Temuco	Temuco	Municipal Germán Becker	18,000
Magallanes	Santiago (San Bernardo)	Municipal Luis Navarro Avilés	3,516
Rangers	Talca	Fiscal de Talca	16,070
San Luis	Quillota	Municipal Lucio Fariña Fernández	7,700
San Marcos de Arica	Arica	Carlos Dittborn	10,000
Santiago Wanderers	Valparaíso	Elías Figueroa Brander	25,500
Unión Española	Santiago (Independencia)	Santa Laura-Universidad SEK	19,887
Unión San Felipe	San Felipe	Municipal de San Felipe	10,000

== Standings ==
Pos	Team	Pld	W	D	L	GF	GA	GD	Pts	Qualification or relegation
1	Cobreloa (C, P)	30	16	9	5	55	30	+25	57	Advance to Promotion final
2	San Luis	30	16	9	5	45	30	+15	57	Advance to Promotion final
3	Deportes Antofagasta	30	14	9	7	54	28	+26	51	Advance to Promotion play-off quarter-finals
4	Santiago Wanderers	30	14	9	7	49	33	+16	51	Advance to Promotion play-off quarter-finals
5	Magallanes	30	13	7	10	47	47	0	46	Advance to Promotion play-off quarter-finals
6	San Marcos de Arica	30	11	10	9	35	29	+6	43	Advance to Promotion play-off quarter-finals
7	Deportes Recoleta	30	11	10	9	42	44	−2	43	Advance to Promotion play-off quarter-finals
8	Deportes Copiapó	30	11	9	10	44	43	+1	42	Advance to Promotion play-off quarter-finals
9	Unión Española	30	12	6	12	38	40	−2	42	
10	Deportes Iquique	30	9	12	9	43	34	+9	39	
11	Deportes Puerto Montt	30	11	5	14	29	39	−10	38	
12	Deportes Temuco	30	9	9	12	46	45	+1	36	
13	Curicó Unido (Note: Curicó Unido were deducted three points for failing to meet the quota of minutes played by under-21 players during the first half of the season.)	30	8	10	12	30	47	−17	31	
14	Deportes Santa Cruz	30	4	13	13	29	43	−14	25	
15	Unión San Felipe	30	5	8	17	22	57	−35	23	
16	Rangers (R)	30	5	7	18	28	47	−19	22	Relegation to Segunda División Profesional

Source: Campeonato Chileno, Soccerway
Rules for classification: 1) Points, 2) Goal difference, 3) Matches won, 4) Goals for, 5) Away goals for, 6) Red cards, 7) Yellow cards, 8) Drawing of lots, 9) Play-off game (only if needed to decide championship or relegation).
If needed to decide championship or relegation between two teams: 2) Play-off game.
(C) Champions; (P) Promoted; (R) Relegated

=== Promotion final ===
Since Cobreloa and San Luis ended tied in points for first place, a tiebreaker match was played to decide the champions and the first promoted team to the Liga de Primera. Cobreloa won the league championship and earned promotion after a scoreless draw in normal time and a 5–4 victory on penalty kicks, while San Luis as the losing side will enter the promotion play-off in the semi-finals.

21 November 2026
18:30 UTC−3

Cobreloa	0–0	San Luis
	Report
Penalties
Delgado (penalty missed); Insaurralde (penalty scored); Conelli (penalty scored); D. Tapia (penalty scored); Gatica (penalty scored); García (penalty missed); Sandoval (penalty scored)	5–4	(penalty scored) Guerra; (penalty scored) Madrigal; (penalty missed) Acosta; (penalty scored) Catalán; (penalty scored) Parada; (penalty missed) Vergara; (penalty missed) N. Muñoz

Estadio Santa Laura, Santiago
Referee: Cristián Garay

== Results ==
Home \ Away	COB	CUR	ANT	CDC	IQQ	DPM	REC	DSC	TEM	MAG	RAN	SLQ	SMA	SW	UE	USF
Cobreloa	—	5–1	2–0	4–1	1–1	3–0	6–1	4–2	3–1	1–1	2–0	3–1	2–0	1–0	0–1	2–0
Curicó Unido	0–0	—	1–0	1–1	2–2	2–1	0–0	1–2	4–1	1–2	1–0	1–2	2–2	0–3	2–1	2–0
Deportes Antofagasta	0–0	4–0	—	1–0	4–0	1–2	1–2	1–1	3–1	0–0	2–0	3–1	3–0	0–0	2–1	5–1
Deportes Copiapó	2–1	4–0	0–4	—	2–0	3–0	2–4	1–1	1–1	1–1	2–0	1–1	0–3	1–0	3–1	2–1
Deportes Iquique	1–2	1–1	1–1	4–0	—	0–0	1–1	0–1	1–0	4–1	1–1	0–1	0–0	2–1	1–0	5–0
Deportes Puerto Montt	1–1	2–0	3–2	2–0	0–4	—	3–1	2–0	1–0	2–0	1–2	0–1	0–2	0–2	0–1	3–1
Deportes Recoleta	2–2	2–2	0–2	2–1	1–1	0–1	—	1–0	1–5	1–2	4–2	0–0	2–1	2–1	2–1	2–0
Deportes Santa Cruz	0–0	4–2	0–0	1–1	2–2	0–0	0–0	—	2–3	2–2	0–0	0–2	1–2	1–3	1–1	1–3
Deportes Temuco	0–1	0–1	3–3	1–4	1–1	3–1	1–1	2–1	—	3–4	2–1	1–1	1–2	3–0	0–1	5–0
Magallanes	2–2	1–0	2–3	2–3	4–3	2–0	3–2	1–0	0–1	—	3–2	0–1	1–1	2–3	3–2	0–0
Rangers	0–1	0–0	0–2	0–0	1–2	0–1	2–4	0–1	1–0	2–3	—	1–1	2–3	0–2	1–1	4–0
San Luis	4–2	1–1	2–1	2–2	2–1	4–1	1–1	3–2	1–1	2–1	1–1	—	1–0	0–1	2–0	4–0
San Marcos de Arica	2–1	3–0	1–1	2–1	1–1	0–0	1–0	1–1	0–1	2–0	1–2	0–1	—	0–0	2–0	0–1
Santiago Wanderers	5–1	1–2	2–2	1–1	1–0	1–1	0–2	3–2	2–2	2–1	4–1	3–1	1–1	—	2–2	2–0
Unión Española	1–1	2–0	0–3	1–0	2–1	2–1	2–1	2–0	1–1	1–2	0–1	2–0	2–1	1–2	—	2–2
Unión San Felipe	0–1	0–0	2–0	1–4	0–2	1–0	0–0	0–0	2–2	0–1	2–1	0–1	1–1	1–1	3–4	—

Source: Campeonato Chileno, Soccerway
Legend: Blue = home team win; Yellow = draw; Red = away team win.

== Promotion play-off ==
The teams placing from second to eighth place in the regular season play a knockout competition (Liguilla) with the regular season runner-up (San Luis) getting a bye to the semi-finals. The winning side will claim the last promotion spot to the Liga de Primera for the next season.

=== Bracket ===
Quarter-finals
6	San Marcos de Arica	2
5	Magallanes	0
7	Deportes Recoleta	3
4	Santiago Wanderers	1
8	Deportes Copiapó	1
3	Deportes Antofagasta	1

Semi-finals

Finals

=== Quarter-finals ===
21 November 2026
20:30 UTC−3

Deportes Copiapó	1–1	Deportes Antofagasta
Ramírez 15' (o.g.)	Report	Bández 76'

Estadio Luis Valenzuela Hermosilla, Copiapó
Referee: Juan Ibarra
27 November 2026
20:00 UTC−3

Deportes Antofagasta	v	Deportes Copiapó

Estadio Regional Calvo y Bascuñán, Antofagasta

20 November 2026
18:00 UTC−3

Deportes Recoleta	3–1	Santiago Wanderers
Provoste 23'; González 42'; Riveros 72'	Report	Valenzuela 7'

Estadio Municipal, La Pintana
Referee: Manuel Vergara
26 November 2026
19:00 UTC−3

Santiago Wanderers	v	Deportes Recoleta

Estadio Elías Figueroa Brander, Valparaíso

22 November 2026
12:00 UTC−3

San Marcos de Arica	2–0	Deportes Magallanes
Melivilú 12'; James 90' (o.g.)	Report

Estadio Carlos Dittborn, Arica
Referee: Rodrigo Farías
28 November 2026
18:00 UTC−3

Magallanes	v	San Marcos de Arica

Estadio Municipal Luis Navarro Avilés, San Bernardo

== Top scorers ==
Rank	Player	Club	Goals
1	(Argentina) Gustavo Gotti	Cobreloa	21
2	(Chile) Diego Arias	Deportes Santa Cruz	17
3	(Argentina) Manuel López	Deportes Copiapó	15
4	(Venezuela) Brayan Hurtado	Deportes Antofagasta	14
5	(Chile) Sebastián Parada	San Luis	13
6	(Uruguay) Marcos Camarda	Santiago Wanderers	12
6	(Argentina) Agustín Venezia	Deportes Iquique	12
8	(Chile) Camilo Melivilú	San Marcos de Arica	11
8	(Chile) Josepablo Monreal	Deportes Antofagasta	11
10	(Chile) Leandro Benegas	Curicó Unido	10
10	(Argentina) Diego Buonanotte	Deportes Temuco	10
10	(Chile) Andrés Vilches	Unión Española	10

Source: Soccerway

== See also ==
- 2026 Liga de Primera
- 2026 Copa de la Liga
- 2026 Copa Chile
- 2026 Supercopa de Chile
