= Mauricio Martínez =

Mauricio Martínez may refer to:

- Mauricio Martínez (boxer) (born 1975), Panamanian boxer
- Mauricio Martínez (actor) (born 1978), Mexican actor and singer
- Mauricio Martínez (Argentine footballer) (born 1993), Argentine footballer
- Mauricio Martínez (Chilean footballer) (born 1995), Chilean footballer
