= Diego Monreal =

Chilean footballer

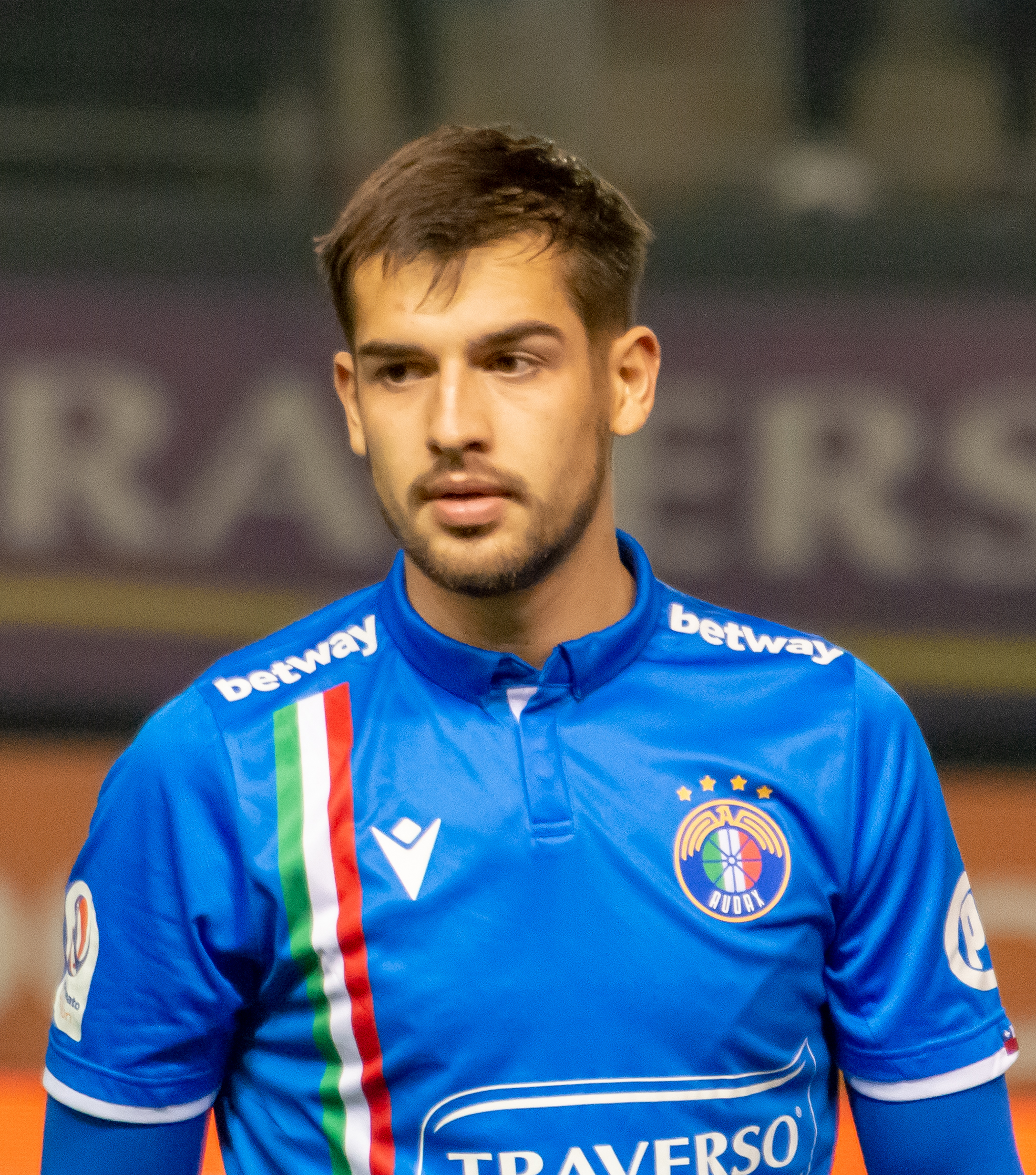
- Monreal with Audax Italiano in 2023.

Personal information
- Full name: Diego Andrés Monreal Villablanca
- Date of birth: 5 September 2002 (age 24)
- Place of birth: Santiago, Chile
- Height: 1.85 m (6 ft 1 in)
- Position: Centre-back

Team information
- Current team: Audax Italiano
- Number: 14

Youth career
- Audax Italiano

Senior career*
Years	Team	Apps	(Gls)
2023–	Audax Italiano	14	(1)
2025	→ Unión La Calera (loan)	4	(0)
- * Club domestic league appearances and goals as of 14 February 2026

Diego Andrés Monreal Villablanca (born 5 September 2002) is a Chilean footballer who plays as a centre-back for Chilean Primera División side Audax Italiano.

== Club career ==
A product of the Audax Italiano youth system, Monreal made his senior debut in the 3–1 away loss against Everton for the Chilean Primera División on 28 February 2023 and scored his first goal in the 2–1 win against Deportes Rengo on 22 June of the same year for the Copa Chile. In the same year, he also took part in the Copa Sudamericana. During the 2025 Liga de Primera, he played on loan for Unión La Calera.

== International career ==
In August 2023, Monreal took part in a training microcyle of Chile U23 under Eduardo Berizzo with views to the 2023 Pan American Games.

== Personal life ==
Diego is the brother of the footballers Sebastián and Josepablo Monreal.
