= Antonio Erburu =

Argentine footballer (born 2000)

Personal information
- Date of birth: 15 January 2000 (age 26)
- Place of birth: Río Colorado, Río Negro, Argentina
- Height: 1.75 m (5 ft 9 in)
- Position: Forward

Team information
- Current team: Deportivo Villalonga

Youth career
- Independiente (Río Colorado)
- 2015–2016: Talleres
- 2016–2021: Independiente

Senior career*
Years	Team	Apps	(Gls)
2014–2015	Independiente (Río Colorado)	16	(1)
2022–2023	Sol de Mayo	5	(1)
2024–2025	Independiente (Río Colorado)	8	(4)
2026–	Deportivo Villalonga	8	(0)
- * Club domestic league appearances and goals as of 16:04, 3 September 2026 (UTC)

Antonio Erburu (born 15 January 2000) is an Argentine footballer currently playing as a forward for Deportivo Villalonga.

== Club career ==
Born in Río Colorado in the Río Negro Province of Argentina, Erburu began his career with local side Independiente, where his father Nelson served as the team's physiotherapist. On 26 October 2014, he was included on the bench for Independiente for their Torneo Federal B fixture against Petrolero Argentino, despite only being fourteen.

The following month, in another Torneo Federal B fixture against Germinal, Erburu made history when he came off the bench, becoming the youngest footballer to feature in an AFA fixture at the age of fourteen. He would hold this record until April 2016, when it was beaten by thirteen-year-old Darío Roa. In August 2015, he became the youngest goal-scorer in Argentine football - a record that still stands - when he scored in Independiente's 2–0 win against Maronese.

The following month, Erburu joined Argentine Primera División side Talleres, with Independiente receiving $36,000 if he were to play ten games in the Primera División, as well as a 10% sell-on fee. He later moved to Independiente of Avellaneda, and progressed through their academy before making his debut for the reserve team in April 2021. The same month, he was registered for Independiente's Copa Sudamericana squad.

For the 2022 season, Erburu moved to Torneo Federal A side Sol de Mayo. He scored his first goal for the club the following season; on 1 April 2023, he scored Sol de Mayo's only goal in a 2–1 Torneo Federal A loss against Sansinena.

He returned to Independiente (Río Colorado) in 2024, and the following year he was the top scorer in qualification for the Torneo Regional Federal Amateur, with ten goals in ten games. By 2026, he was playing for Deportivo Villalonga.

== Career statistics ==
=== Club ===
As of 6 September 2023.

Appearances and goals by club, season and competition
Club	Season	League			Cup		Other		Total	
Club	Season	Division	Apps	Goals	Apps	Goals	Apps	Goals	Apps	Goals
Independiente (Río Colorado)	2014	Torneo Federal B	16	1	0	0	0	0	16	1
Independiente (Río Colorado)	2015	Torneo Federal B	16	1	0	0	0	0	16	1
Sol de Mayo	2022	Torneo Federal A	3	0	0	0	0	0	3	0
Sol de Mayo	2023	Torneo Federal A	2	1	0	0	0	0	2	1
Sol de Mayo	Total		5	1	0	0	0	0	5	1
Career total			21	2	0	0	0	0	21	2
