= Diego García (footballer, born 19 December 1996) =

Chilean footballer

Personal information
- Full name: Diego Ignacio García Medina
- Date of birth: December 19, 1996 (age 29)
- Place of birth: Chañaral, Chile
- Height: 1.83 m (6 ft 0 in)
- Position: Centre-back

Team information
- Current team: Cobreloa
- Number: 15

Youth career
- Deportes Antofagasta
- Universidad de Chile

Senior career*
Years	Team	Apps	(Gls)
2014–2018	Universidad de Chile	1	(0)
2016–2017	→ Barnechea (loan)	31	(0)
2017	→ Rangers (loan)	14	(0)
2018	→ Deportes Copiapó (loan)	19	(1)
2019	Deportes Copiapó	20	(1)
2020	Curicó Unido	0	(0)
2020–2024	Deportes Copiapó	129	(5)
2025	Everton	11	(0)
2026–	Cobreloa	20	(0)
- * Club domestic league appearances and goals as of 22 November 2026

Diego Ignacio García Medina (born 19 December 1996 in Chañaral, Chile) is a Chilean footballer who plays as a defender for Cobreloa.

== Career ==
A historical player for Deportes Copiapó, García moved to Everton de Viña del Mar for the 2025 season. The next year, he switched to Cobreloa.

== Honours ==
Cobreloa

- Primera B de Chile: 2026
