= 2009 in Chilean football =

Football in Chile
- Season: 2009

This article covers the 2009 football season in Chile.

== National tournaments ==
=== Primera División ===
- Apertura Champion: Universidad de Chile (13th title)
  - Topscorer: Esteban Paredes (17 goals)
- Clausura Champion: Colo-Colo (29th title)
  - Topscorer: Diego Rivarola (13 goals)
- Relegated: Curicó Unido, Rangers, Municipal Iquique

Source: RSSSF

=== Copa Chile ===
- Winner: Unión San Felipe (1st title)

Source: RSSSF

== National team results ==
Win Draw Loss

=== Friendly matches ===
January 18	Honduras	2–0	Chile	Fort Lauderdale, United States
19:00 UTC-5	Pavón 77'; Guevara 84' (pen.)	(Report)		Stadium: Lockhart Stadium; Attendance: 18,000; Referee: Shane Moody (United States)

February 11	South Africa	0–2	Chile	Polokwane, South Africa
19:30 UTC+2		(Report)	Valdivia 45'; Alexis 67'	Stadium: Pietersburg Stadium; Attendance: 15,000; Referee: Willson Mpansini (Zambia)

May 27	Japan	4–0	Chile	Osaka, Japan
19:35 UTC+9	Okazaki 20' 24'; Abe 53'; Honda 90+2'	(Report) (Report)		Stadium: Nagai Stadium; Attendance: 43,531; Referee: Anders Hermansen (Denmark)

May 29	Belgium	1–1	Chile	Chiba, Japan
19:00 UTC+9	Roelandts 17'	(Report)	Medel 23'	Stadium: Fukuda Denshi Arena; Attendance: 6,050; Referee: Minoru Tojo (Japan)

August 12	Denmark	1–2	Chile	Brøndby, Denmark
20:15 UTC+2	Schøne 63'	(Report)	Paredes 61'; Alexis 69'	Stadium: Brøndby Stadium; Attendance: 12,000; Referee: Kristinn Jakobsson (Iceland)

November 4	Chile	2–1	Paraguay	Talcahuano, Chile
22:30 UTC-3	González 73'; Paredes 93'		Luis Cabral 69'	Stadium: Estadio CAP; Attendance: 10,500; Referee: Hector Baldassi (Argentina)

November 17	Slovakia	1–2	Chile	Žilina, Slovakia
17:00 UTC+1	Šesták 17'	(Report)	Jara 9'; Paredes 55'	Stadium: Stadium Pod Dubňom; Attendance: 11,072; Referee: Istvan Vad (Hungary)

=== 2010 World Cup qualifiers ===
March 29 Round 11	Peru	1–3	Chile	Lima, Peru
18:10 UTC-5	Fano 34'	(Report)	Alexis 2'; Suazo 32' (pen.); Fernández 70'	Stadium: Estadio Monumental; Attendance: 48,700; Referee: Carlos Amarilla (Paraguay)

April 1 Round 12	Chile	0–0	Uruguay	Santiago, Chile
19:10 UTC-4		(Report)		Stadium: Estadio Nacional; Attendance: 55,000; Referee: Héctor Baldassi (Argentina)

June 6 Round 13	Paraguay	0–2	Chile	Asunción, Paraguay
18:50 UTC-4		(Report)	Fernández 13'; Suazo 50'	Stadium: Estadio Defensores del Chaco; Attendance: 34,000; Referee: Sergio Pezzotta (Argentina)

June 10 Round 14	Chile	4–0	Bolivia	Santiago, Chile
21:00 UTC-4	Beausejour 43'; Estrada 74'; Alexis 78', 88'	(Report)		Stadium: Estadio Nacional; Attendance: 60,214; Referee: Roberto Silvera (Uruguay)

September 5 Round 15	Chile	2–2	Venezuela	Santiago, Chile
21:30 UTC-4	Vidal 11'; Millar 53'	(Report)	Maldonado 34'; Rey 45+1'	Stadium: Estadio Monumental; Attendance: 44,000; Referee: René Ortubé (Bolivia)

September 9 Round 16	Brazil	4–2	Chile	Salvador, Brazil
22:00 UTC-3	Nilmar 31', 74', 76'; Júlio Baptista 40'	(Report)	Suazo 45+1' (pen.), 52'	Stadium: Estádio de Pituaçu; Attendance: 30,000; Referee: Jorge Larrionda (Uruguay)

October 10 Round 17	Colombia	2–4	Chile	Medellín, Colombia
17:00 UTC-5	Vidal, o.g 14'; G. Moreno 53'	(Report)	Ponce 34'; Suazo 35'; Valdivia 71'; Orellana 78'	Stadium: Estadio Atanasio Girardot; Attendance: 18,000; Referee: Victor Hugo Rivera (Perú)

October 14 Round 18	Chile	1–0	Ecuador	Santiago, Chile
19:00 UTC-3	Suazo 53'	(Report)		Stadium: Estadio Monumental; Attendance: 47,000; Referee: Carlos Torres (Paraguay)
