= Darío Roa =

Argentine footballer (born 2002)

Personal information
- Full name: Darío Ismael Roa Ocampo
- Date of birth: 6 July 2002 (age 24)
- Place of birth: Trelew, Chubut, Argentina
- Positions: Forward; midfielder

Team information
- Current team: Colchagua

Youth career
- 2006–2016: Racing de Trelew
- 2017–2020: San Lorenzo

Senior career*
Years	Team	Apps	(Gls)
2016	Racing de Trelew	1	(0)
2021–2022	Racing de Trelew	4	(1)
2022	Provincial Ranco		(32)
2023–	Colchagua		
- * Club domestic league appearances and goals as of 16:04, 6 September 2023 (UTC)

Darío Ismael Roa Ocampo (born 6 July 2002) is an Argentine footballer currently playing as a forward for Chilean side Colchagua.

== Club career ==
Born in Trelew, in the Chubut Province of Argentina, Roa took an interest in football at a young age, and at the age of three he joined local side Racing de Trelew. On 11 April 2016, having been promoted to the club's first team, he was named on the bench for a Torneo Federal B fixture against Independiente, but did not feature in Racing's 6–0 win. Despite his annoyance at having travelled but not played, which he expressed to his coach, Guillermo Samso, he returned to the youth team and provided an assist in his side's 2–1 win on Saturday 23 April.

The following day, Roa was again asked to travel with the first team for another Torneo Federal B fixture, this time against Cruz del Sur. Late in the second half, he was brought on as a substitute for Damián París, and at thirteen years, nine months and eighteen days, he became the youngest footballer to feature in an AFA competition, beating the previous record held by Antonio Erburu, who played at the age of fourteen in 2014.

Following his appearance for Racing, he was approached by San Lorenzo scout Darío Bombini, and made the move to the Buenos Aires-based club at the end of the 2016 season. During his time at San Lorenzo, he trained with the first team on occasion, starting in 2018. He returned to Racing for the 2021–22 edition of the Torneo Regional Federal Amateur, where he played four matches, scoring once.

In April 2022, Roa moved to Chile, where he joined Provincial Ranco ahead of the 2022 Tercera A. Having scored thirty two goals for Provincial Ranco in 2022, he was signed by fellow Tercera A side Colchagua in early 2023. He scored Colchagua's only goal in their 6–1 home loss to Unión Española in the Copa Chile on 9 April 2023.

== Personal life ==
Roa is of Chilean descent through his grandfather.

== Career statistics ==
=== Club ===
As of 6 September 2023.

Appearances and goals by club, season and competition
Club	Season	League			Cup		Other		Total	
Club	Season	Division	Apps	Goals	Apps	Goals	Apps	Goals	Apps	Goals
Racing de Trelew	2016	Torneo Federal B	1	0	0	0	0	0	1	0
Racing de Trelew	2021–22	Torneo Regional Federal Amateur	4	1	0	0	0	0	4	1
Racing de Trelew	Total		5	1	0	0	0	0	5	1
Provincial Ranco	2022	Tercera A	–		2 (Note: Appearances in the Copa Chile)	2	0	0	2	2
Colchagua	2023	Tercera A	–		1	1	0	0	1	1
Career total			5	1	3	3	0	0	8	4
