= Óscar Salinas =

Chilean footballer (born 1988)

Personal information
- Full name: Óscar Fernando Salinas Aguilar
- Date of birth: 26 June 1988 (age 38)
- Place of birth: Curacaví, Chile
- Height: 1.73 m (5 ft 8 in)
- Positions: Winger; forward

Youth career
- Universidad de Chile
- Deportes Melipilla

Senior career*
| Years | Team | Apps | (Gls) |
| 2006–2008 | Deportes Melipilla | 25 | (1) |
| 2009–2011 | Unión Temuco | 46 | (20) |
| 2011 | → Iberia (loan) | 28 | (16) |
| 2012 | Cobresal | 21 | (3) |
| 2013–2015 | Coquimbo Unido | 48 | (2) |
| 2015–2016 | Iberia | 33 | (13) |
| 2016–2017 | Deportes Antofagasta | 26 | (5) |
| 2017–2018 | Everton | 40 | (8) |
| 2019 | Deportes Iquique | 17 | (3) |
| 2020 | Oriente Petrolero | 8 | (3) |
| 2020–2022 | Cobresal | 24 | (9) |
| 2023 | Deportes Temuco | 32 | (4) |
| 2024–2025 | Deportes Recoleta | 60 | (6) |
| Total | | 408 | (93) |
- * Club domestic league appearances and goals

Óscar Fernando Salinas Aguilar (born 26 June 1988) is a Chilean former footballer who played as a forward.

== Career ==
For the 2024 season, Salinas signed with Deportes Recoleta from Deportes Temuco. He left them at the end of the 2025 season.

Salinas announced his retirement in March 2026.

== Honours ==
Deportes Melipilla

- Primera B: 2006

Unión Temuco

- Tercera División: 2009

Individual

- Tercera División Top-scorer (2): 2009, 2011
- Amateur Footballer of the Year (1): 2009
