= Mauricio Martínez (Chilean footballer) =

Chilean footballer

Personal information
- Full name: Mauricio Javier Martínez Neira
- Date of birth: 30 March 1995 (age 31)
- Place of birth: Concepción, Chile
- Height: 1.76 m (5 ft 9 in)
- Position: Attacking midfielder

Youth career
- 2002–2013: Huachipato
- 2013: Naval

Senior career*
Years	Team	Apps	(Gls)
2014	Sichuan Longfor		
2014–2015	Naval		
2016	Lota Schwager		
2016–2017	Naval	24	(4)
2018–2019	Guizhou Fengyun		(31)
2019–2020	Guiyang Hongrun Chemical		
2020–2021	Provincial Ranco		

Managerial career
- 2018–2020: Guizhou Fengyun (youth)
- * Club domestic league appearances and goals

Mauricio Javier Martínez Neira (born 30 March 1995) is a Chilean professional footballer who plays as an attacking midfielder.

== Club career ==
Born in Concepción, Chile, Martínez is a product of both the Huachipato and the Naval youth systems. He emigrated to China in 2014 and joined Sichuan Longfor with the Spanish coach José Hernández Suárez.

Back in Chile, he joined Naval, playing for them until 2017, also playing for Lota Schwager in 2016.

In 2018, he returned to China thanks to José Hernández Suárez and joined Guizhou Fengyun FC. For them, he scored eighteen goals in 2018, becoming the best player and top goalscorer of the league, and thirteen goals in 2019, before switching to Guiyang Hongrun Chemical. He was the only foreign player for Guizou Fengyun in that seasons.

After holidays in his homeland and not being able to return to China due to COVID-19 pandemic, he signed with Provincial Ranco in 2020.

== Coaching career ==
At the same time he was a player of Guizhou Fengyun, he served as coach of the youth ranks alongside the Chinese coach Chen Jian.

He also served as a football teacher and assistant coach for public schools alongside José Hernández Suárez.

== Personal life ==
He is nicknamed Piri.

In Chile, he has worked as a stock clerk and chauffeur for apps like Uber.
