= Renato González =

Chilean footballer (born 1990)

Personal information
- Full name: Renato Patricio González De La Hoz
- Date of birth: 19 February 1990 (age 36)
- Place of birth: Santiago, Chile
- Height: 1.67 m (5 ft 5 1/2 in)
- Position: Attacking midfielder

Youth career
- 2006–2009: Palestino

Senior career*
Years	Team	Apps	(Gls)
2008–2009	Palestino	12	(0)
2010	Ponte Preta	2	(0)
2011–2017	Universidad de Concepción	30	(3)
2011	→ Cobresal (loan)	7	(1)
2012	→ Anapolina (loan)	0	(0)
2012	→ San Marcos (loan)	31	(8)
2013–2015	→ San Marcos (loan)	67	(11)
2015	→ Universidad de Chile (loan)	11	(0)
2017	San Marcos	15	(0)
2018	Deportes Antofagasta	8	(2)
2018	Santiago Morning	11	(0)
2019–2021	San Marcos	47	(3)
2021	Deportes Puerto Montt	13	(0)
2022	Deportes Recoleta	5	(0)
2022–2023	Deportes Valdivia	29	(1)
2024	Real San Joaquín	23	(1)

International career^{‡}
2009	Chile	1	(1)
- * Club domestic league appearances and goals as of 11 March 2024 ‡ National team caps and goals as of 4 November 2009

Renato Patricio González De La Hoz (born 19 February 1990) is a Chilean footballer who plays as an attacking midfielder.

== Career ==
González had stint in Brazil with Ponte Preta in 2010 and Anapolina in 2012.

In 2024, González signed with Real San Joaquín in the Segunda División Profesional de Chile.

== Career statistics ==
As of match played on 25 February 2018

Appearances and goals by club, season and competition
Club	Season	League			Cup		League Cup		Other		Total	
Club	Season	Division	Apps	Goals	Apps	Goals	Apps	Goals	Apps	Goals	Apps	Goals
Palestino	2009	Primera División of Chile	1	0	0	0	—				1	0
Ponte Preta	2010	Campeonato Brasileiro Série B	2	0	1	0	—		6	0	9	0
Universidad Concepción	2011	Primera División of Chile	2	0	0	0	—				2	0
Universidad Concepción	2013	Primera B de Chile	5	1	0	0	—				5	1
Universidad Concepción	2015–16	Primera División of Chile	11	2	0	0	—				11	2
Universidad Concepción	2016–17	Chilean Primera División	12	0	2	0	—		2	0	16	0
Universidad Concepción	Total		30	3	2	0	0	0	2	0	34	3
Cobresal (loan)	2011	Primera División of Chile	7	1	6	1	—				13	2
San Marcos (loan)	2012	Primera B de Chile	31	8	6	1	—				37	9
San Marcos (loan)	2013–14	Primera B de Chile	30	7	5	0	—				35	7
San Marcos (loan)	2014–15	Primera División of Chile	37	4	4	2	—				41	6
San Marcos (loan)	Total		67	11	9	2	0	0	0	0	76	13
Universidad de Chile (loan)	2015–16	Primera División of Chile	11	0	9	1	—				20	1
San Marcos	2017	Primera B de Chile	15	0	3	0	—		1	0	19	0
Antofagasta	2018	Chilean Primera División	8	2	1	0	—				9	2
Career totals			172	25	37	5	0	0	9	0	218	30

== International goals ==
Goal	Date	Venue	Opponent	Score	Result	Competition
1	4 November 2009	Estadio CAP, Talcahuano, Chile	Paraguay	1–1	2–1	Friendly

== Honours ==
San Marcos de Arica

- Primera B: 2012
