= Provincial Ranco =

- Full name: Club Deportivo Provincial Ranco
- Nickname(s): Milenario (Millennial)
- Founded: May 29, 2008
- Ground: Carlos Vogel; La Unión, Chile
- Capacity: 4 000
- Chairman: Angelo Reckmann
- Manager: Mauricio Benavides
- League: Tercera División B
- 2022: 3.°
Home colours	Away colours	Third colours

Club Deportivo Provincial Ranco, commonly referred to as Provincial Ranco, is a football club based in La Unión, Chile.

== History ==
In the cup chile, in Phase 1 he left Deportes Valdivia behind after a 4-3 aggregate, in Phase 2 he would be eliminated after a 4-1 defeat against Deportes Puerto Montt.

In the 2023 Copa Chile, in Phase 1 he would be eliminated after a 3-1 defeat against Comunal Cabrero.

== Seasons ==
- 3 seasons in Tercera División A (2020–2023)
- 2 seasons in Tercera División B (2018–2019)

== Coaches ==
- (Chile) Jaime Barrientos (2018–2019)
- (Chile) Mauricio Benavides (2019–2020)
- (Spain) Kevin Vidaña (2021)
- (Chile) Mario Vera (2022)
- (Argentina) Javier Guerreiro (2022)
- (Chile) Mauricio Benavides (2023–)

== Kits ==
=== Home ===
2018	2019	2021	2022

=== Away ===
2018	2019	2021	2022

=== Third ===
2021	2022

== Sponsorship ==
Period	Brand	Sponsor
2018—2020	Squadra	Diario Ciudadano
2020—2021	Squadra	Colún
2022—	OneFit	Colún

== Bibliography ==
- Gatica Wierman, Héctor (2019). Almanaque del Fútbol Chileno. Clubes. Hueders. ISBN 9789563651140.
