= Agustín Venezia =

Argentine footballer

Personal information
- Full name: Agustín Adrián Venezia Retamosa
- Date of birth: 5 July 2003 (age 23)
- Place of birth: El Trébol, Santa Fe, Argentina
- Height: 1.72 m (5 ft 8 in)
- Position: Forward

Team information
- Current team: Deportes Iquique (on loan from Talleres)

Youth career
- Atlético El Expreso
- Americano MYS
- 2019–2020: Talleres

Senior career*
Years	Team	Apps	(Gls)
2021–	Talleres	3	(0)
2024–2025	→ Deportivo Cuenca (loan)	24	(3)
2025–	→ Deportes Iquique (loan)	12	(0)
- * Club domestic league appearances and goals as of 25 January 2026

Agustín Adrián Venezia Retamosa (born 5 July 2003) is an Argentine footballer who plays as a forward for Chilean club Deportes Iquique on loan from Talleres de Córdoba.

== Club career ==
Born in El Trébol and raised in Carlos Pellegrini, Santa Fe, Argentina, Venezia was with local clubs Atlético El Expreso and Americano MYS as a youth player. He came to Talleres de Córdoba in 2019. He was promoted to the senior team in January 2021 and made his professional debut in the 3–2 away loss against Newell's Old Boys on 17 July of the same year. Later, he signed his first professional contract in February 2023 on a deal until December 2027.

In July 2024, Venezia was loaned out to Ecuadorian club Deportivo Cuenca for a year. In August 2025, he moved to Chile and joined Deportes Iquique in the top level.
