= Nahuel Donadell =

Argentine naturalized Chilean footballer (born 1991)

Personal information
- Full name: Nahuel Alexander Donadell Álvarez
- Date of birth: 30 March 1991 (age 35)
- Place of birth: Mendoza, Argentina
- Height: 1.58 m (5 ft 2 in)
- Position: Forward

Team information
- Current team: San Marcos
- Number: 22

Youth career
- 2009–2011: Unión Española

Senior career*
Years	Team	Apps	(Gls)
2011–2016	Unión Española	13	(0)
2012–2013	Unión Española B	38	(11)
2013–2014	→ Deportes Puerto Montt (loan)	22	(5)
2014–2015	→ Deportes Valdivia (loan)	31	(4)
2015–2016	→ San Antonio Unido (loan)	30	(4)
2016–2018	Deportes Valdivia	63	(5)
2019	General Velásquez	21	(12)
2020–2024	San Marcos	111	(24)
2024	→ Cobreloa (loan)	11	(3)
2025	Coquimbo Unido	13	(2)
2026–	San Marcos	0	(0)
- * Club domestic league appearances and goals as of 14 December 2024

Nahuel Alexander Donadell Álvarez (born 30 March 1991) is an Argentine naturalized Chilean footballer who plays as a forward for San Marcos de Arica.

== Career ==
As a youth player, Donadell had trials with Colo-Colo and Audax Italiano before joining the Unión Española youth systems at the age of 18. Besides the senior team, he also made appearances for the B-team in the Segunda División Profesional de Chile.

In the second half of 2024, Donadell signed with Cobreloa on loan from San Marcos de Arica on a deal until the end of the season with an option to buy.

Donadell signed with Coquimbo Unido for the 2025 season and won the 2025 league title, the first one for the club.

In January 2026, Donadell returned to San Marcos de Arica.

== Personal life ==
Donadell came to Santiago, Chile, at the age of 14. He later acquired Chilean nationality.

== Honours ==
San Marcos de Arica

- Segunda División Profesional de Chile: 2022

Coquimbo Unido

- Chilean Primera División: 2025
