= Benjamín Berríos =

Chilean footballer (born 1998)

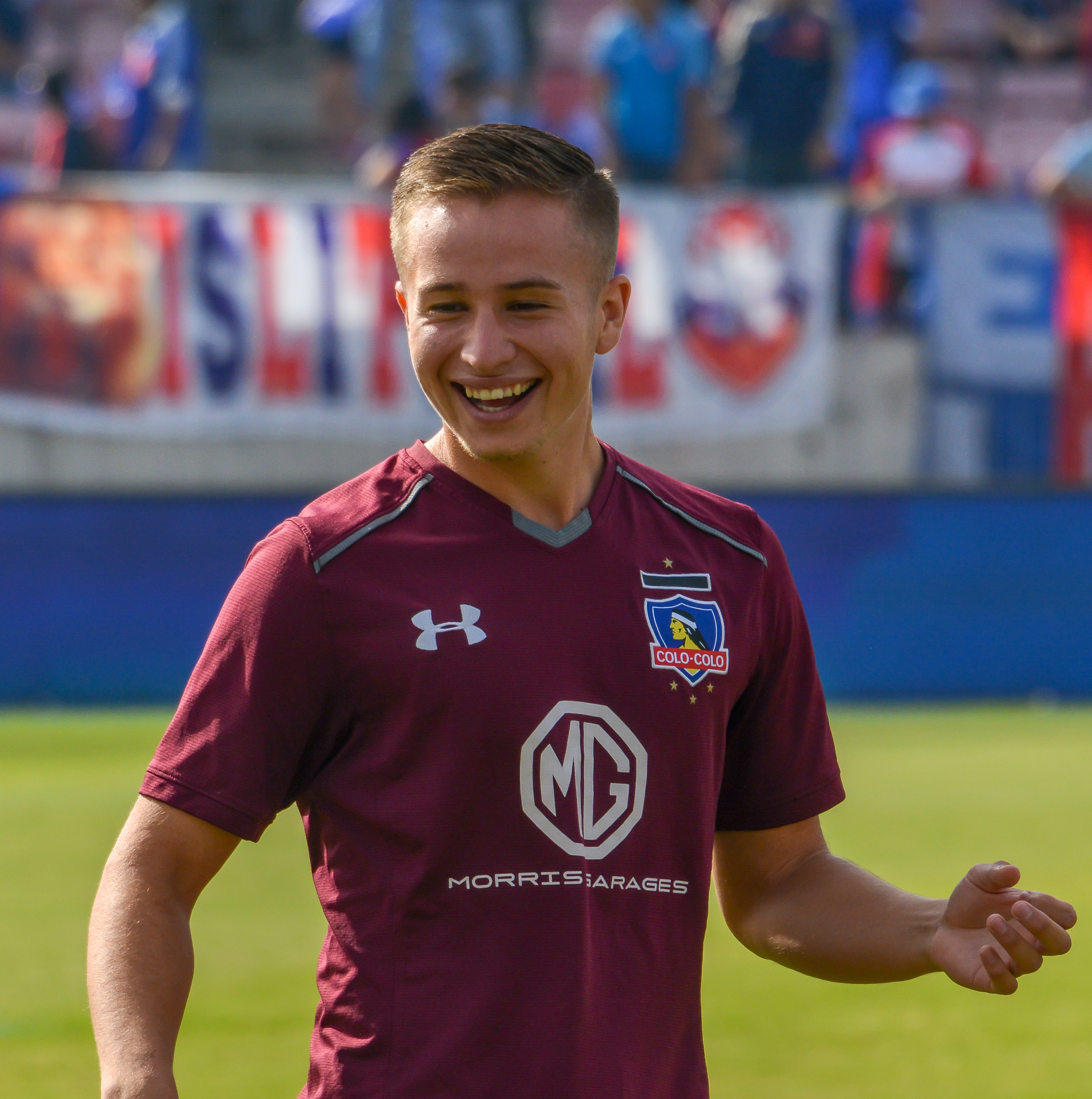

Personal information
- Full name: Benjamín Berríos
- Date of birth: 9 March 1998 (age 28)
- Place of birth: Chile
- Position: Midfielder

Team information
- Current team: Everton
- Number: 21

Senior career*
Years	Team	Apps	(Gls)
2017–2019	Colo-Colo	14	(0)
2019–	→ Everton (loan)	7	(1)
2020–	Everton	19	(1)
- * Club domestic league appearances and goals as of 14 September 2021

Benjamín Berríos (born 9 March 1998) is a Chilean footballer who plays for Everton.
