= Aldrix Jara =

Chilean footballer

Personal information
- Full name: Aldrix Esteban Jara Falcón
- Date of birth: 8 September 2000 (age 26)
- Place of birth: Quilpué, Chile
- Height: 1.78 m (5 ft 10 in)
- Position: Forward

Team information
- Current team: Deportes Concepción
- Number: 19

Youth career
- Cruz del Sur
- Pedro Montt
- Santiago Wanderers

Senior career*
Years	Team	Apps	(Gls)
2019–2023	Santiago Wanderers	37	(2)
2020–2021	→ Deportes Recoleta (loan)	10	(0)
2022–2023	→ Trasandino (loan)	32	(7)
2024–2025	Deportes Limache	36	(2)
2025	Cobreloa	21	(12)
2026–	Deportes Concepción	0	(0)
- * Club domestic league appearances and goals as of 28 December 2025

Aldrix Esteban Jara Falcón (born 8 September 2000) is a Chilean footballer who plays as a forward for Deportes Concepción.

== Club career ==
Born in Quilpué, Chile, Jara was with Cruz del Sur from Villa Alemana and Pedro Montt from his hometown before joining the Santiago Wanderers youth ranks. He was promoted to the first team in the 2019 season and was a member of the squad that won the 2019 Primera B de Chile. The next year, he made his professional debut in the 0–3 loss against Unión La Calera on 15 October 2020 for the Chilean Primera División.

Having had stints on loan with Deportes Recoleta in 2020 and Trasandino in 2022–23, Jara left Santiago Wanderers at the end of 2023.

In January 2024, Jara joined Deportes Limache, getting promotion to the Chilean top level. He continued with them in the 2025 Primera División.

In July 2025, Jara joined Cobreloa and scored a hat-trick by first time in the 4–1 win against Rangers de Talca on 2 August 2025.

In December 2025, Jara joined Deportes Concepción.
