= Álvaro Madrid =

Chilean footballer (born 1995)

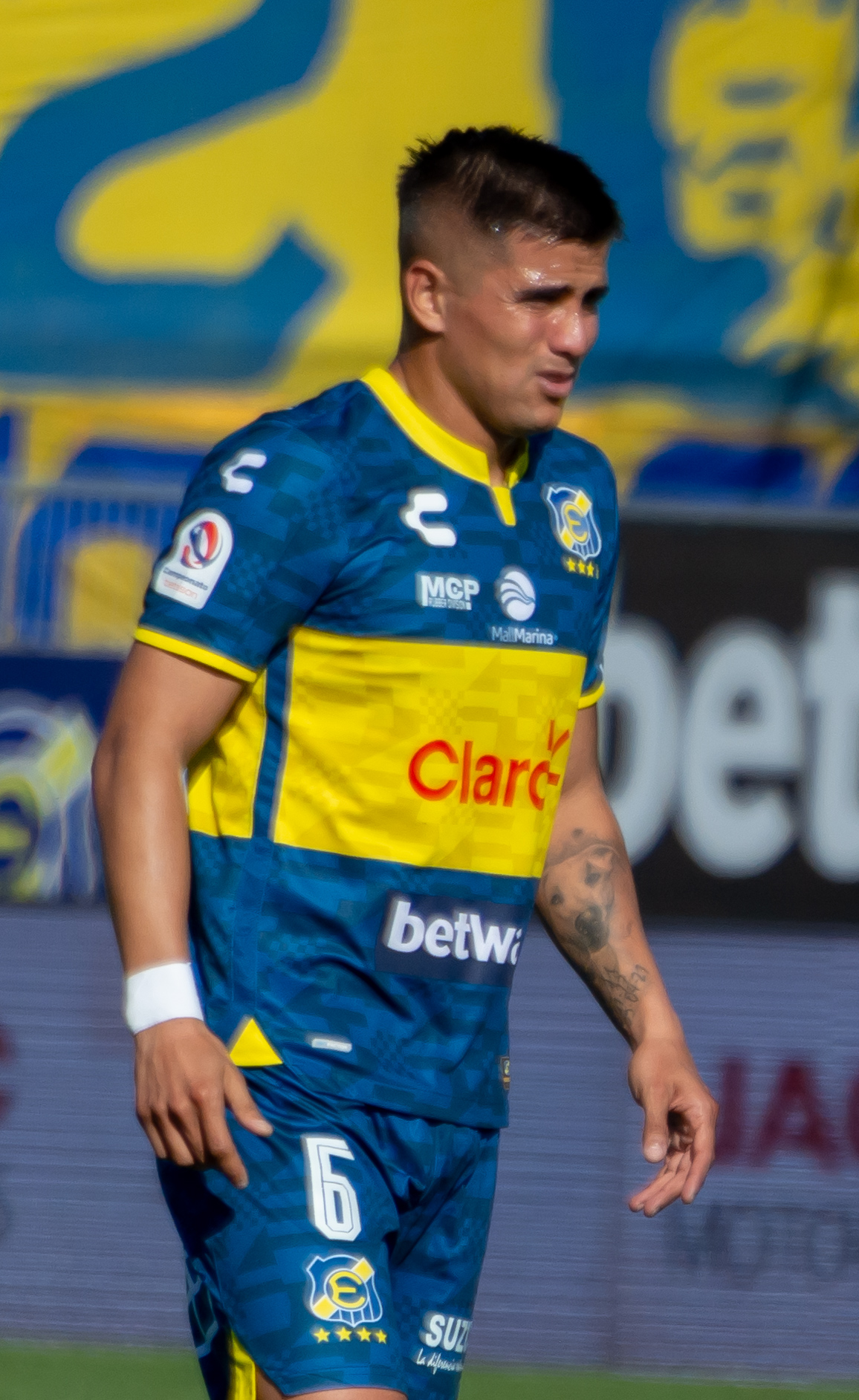
- Madrid with Everton in 2023

Personal information
- Full name: Álvaro Alfredo Alejandro Madrid Gaete
- Date of birth: 5 April 1995 (age 31)
- Place of birth: Valparaíso, Chile
- Position: Midfielder

Team information
- Current team: Colo-Colo (on loan from Everton)

Youth career
- Everton

Senior career*
Years	Team	Apps	(Gls)
2012–	Everton	275	(13)
2016–2017	→ Unión La Calera (loan)	17	(1)
2026–	→ Colo-Colo (loan)	30	(7)

International career^{‡}
2025–	Chile	1	(0)
- * Club domestic league appearances and goals as of 4 February 2026 ‡ National team caps and goals as of 18 March 2025

Álvaro Alfredo Alejandro Madrid Gaete (born 5 April 1995) is a Chilean footballer who plays as a midfielder for Colo-Colo on loan from Everton de Viña del Mar.

== Club career ==
On 4 February 2026, Madrid joined Colo-Colo from Everton de Viña del Mar on a one-year loan with an option to buy.

== International career ==
Madrid received his first call-up to the Chile senior team for the friendly against Panama on 8 February 2025. He made his debut by replacing Vicente Pizarro at the minute 57.

== Career statistics ==
=== International ===
As of match played 8 February 2025

Appearances and goals by national team and year
National team	Year	Apps	Goals
Chile	2025	1	0
Total		1	0
