= Esteban Moreira =

Chilean footballer (born 2002)

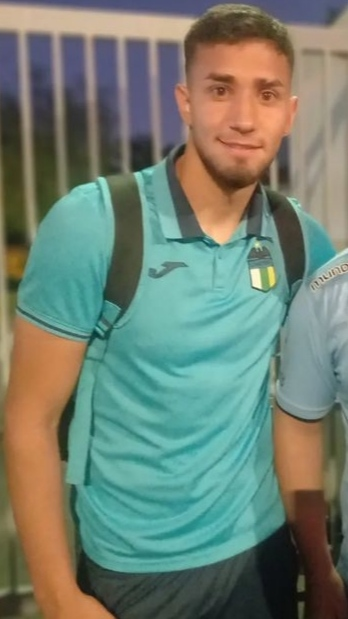
- Moreira with O'Higgins in 2024

Personal information
- Full name: Esteban Ignacio Moreira Soto
- Date of birth: 17 February 2002 (age 24)
- Place of birth: Rancagua, Chile
- Height: 1.88 m (6 ft 2 in)
- Position: Striker

Team information
- Current team: O'Higgins
- Number: 18

Youth career
- 2019–2020: O'Higgins

Senior career*
Years	Team	Apps	(Gls)
2020–	O'Higgins	50	(6)
2025	→ Deportes La Serena (loan)	18	(1)

International career^{‡}
2020	Chile U20	2	(0)
2022	Chile U23	1	(0)
- * Club domestic league appearances and goals as of 23 January 2026 ‡ National team caps and goals as of 27 March 2023

Esteban Ignacio Moreira Soto (born 17 February 2002) is a Chilean professional footballer who plays as a striker for Chilean Primera División club O'Higgins.

== Club career ==
Born in Rancagua, Chile, Moreira joined O'Higgins at the age of seventeen from an amateur team from Graneros. In 2020, he was promoted to the first team and made his debut in a Primera División match against Cobresal in 8 October. He scored his first goal in a match against Colo-Colo on 22 May 2022. He was loaned out to Deportes La Serena for the 2025 season.

== International career ==
Moreira represented Chile U20 at the Granja Comary International Tournament played in Teresópolis, Brazil, making two appearances against Peru U20, and Brazil U20.

On 31 August 2022, he made an appearance for Chile at under-23 level in a 1–0 win against Peru U23.
