= César Huanca =

Chilean footballer (born 2001)

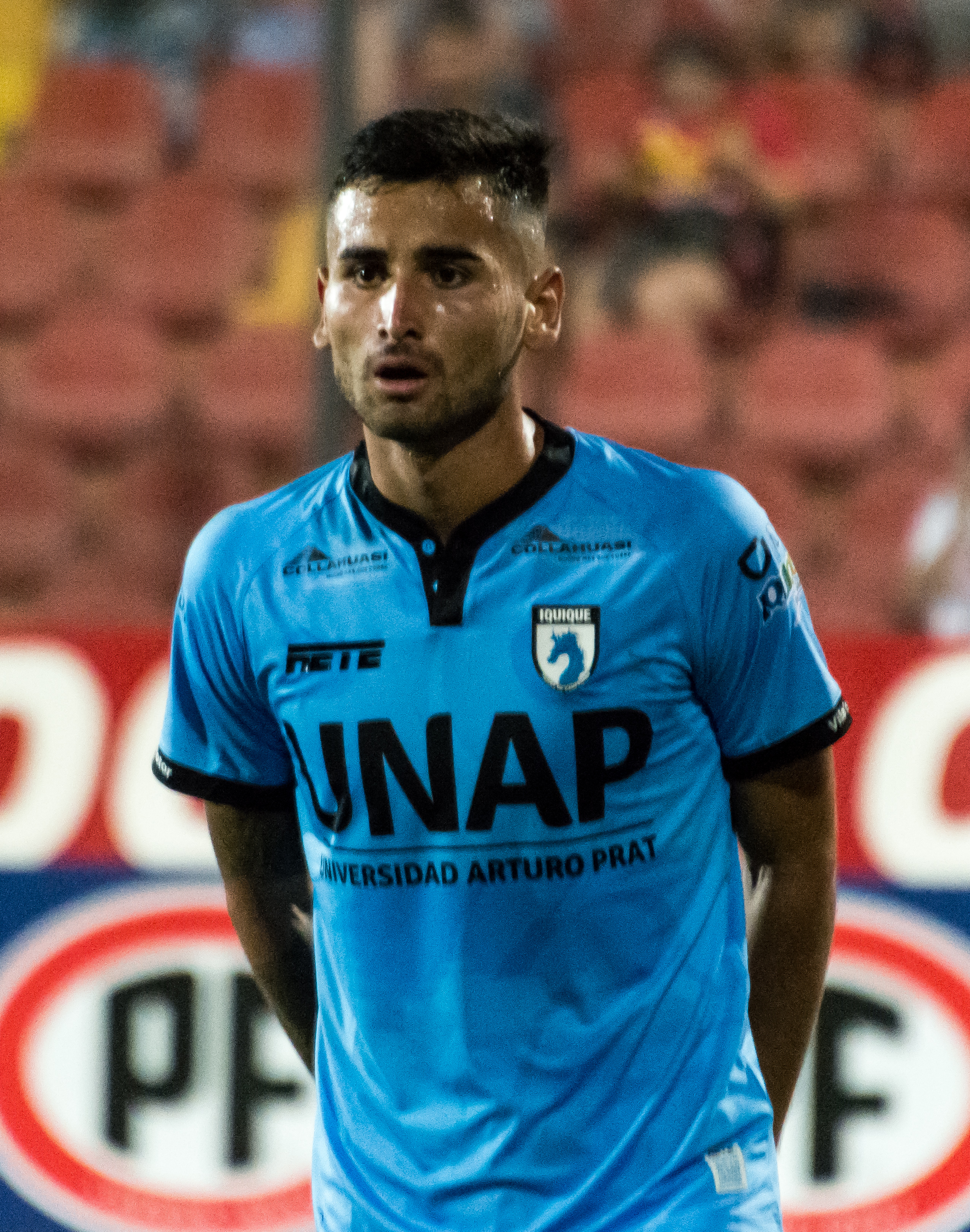
- Huanca with Deportes Iquique in 2020

Personal information
- Full name: César Alejandro Huanca Araya
- Date of birth: 4 June 2001 (age 25)
- Place of birth: Iquique, Chile
- Height: 1.81 m (5 ft 11 1/2 in)
- Position: Forward

Team information
- Current team: Deportes Temuco
- Number: 29

Youth career
- Deportes Iquique

Senior career*
Years	Team	Apps	(Gls)
2016–2021	Deportes Iquique	21	(6)
2021–2025	Huachipato	13	(1)
2022	→ Coquimbo Unido (loan)	20	(4)
2023	→ Coquimbo Unido (loan)	5	(0)
2024	→ Unión San Felipe (loan)	17	(3)
2025	→ Cobreloa (loan)	7	(1)
2026–	Deportes Temuco	0	(0)
- * Club domestic league appearances and goals as of 11 December 2025

César Alejandro Huanca Araya (born 4 June 2001) is a Chilean professional footballer who plays as a forward for Deportes Temuco.

== Career ==
Huanca played for Coquimbo Unido on loan from Huachipato in 2022 and the second half of 2023. In 2024, he moved on loan to Unión San Felipe. In September 2025, he was loaned out again to Cobreloa.

On 19 January 2026, Huanca joined Deportes Temuco.

== Personal life ==
His surname, Huanca, means "Rock" in Quechua language.

== Honours ==
Huachipato

- Chilean Primera División: 2023
- Copa Chile: 2025
