= Claudio Torres =

Chilean footballer (born 2003)

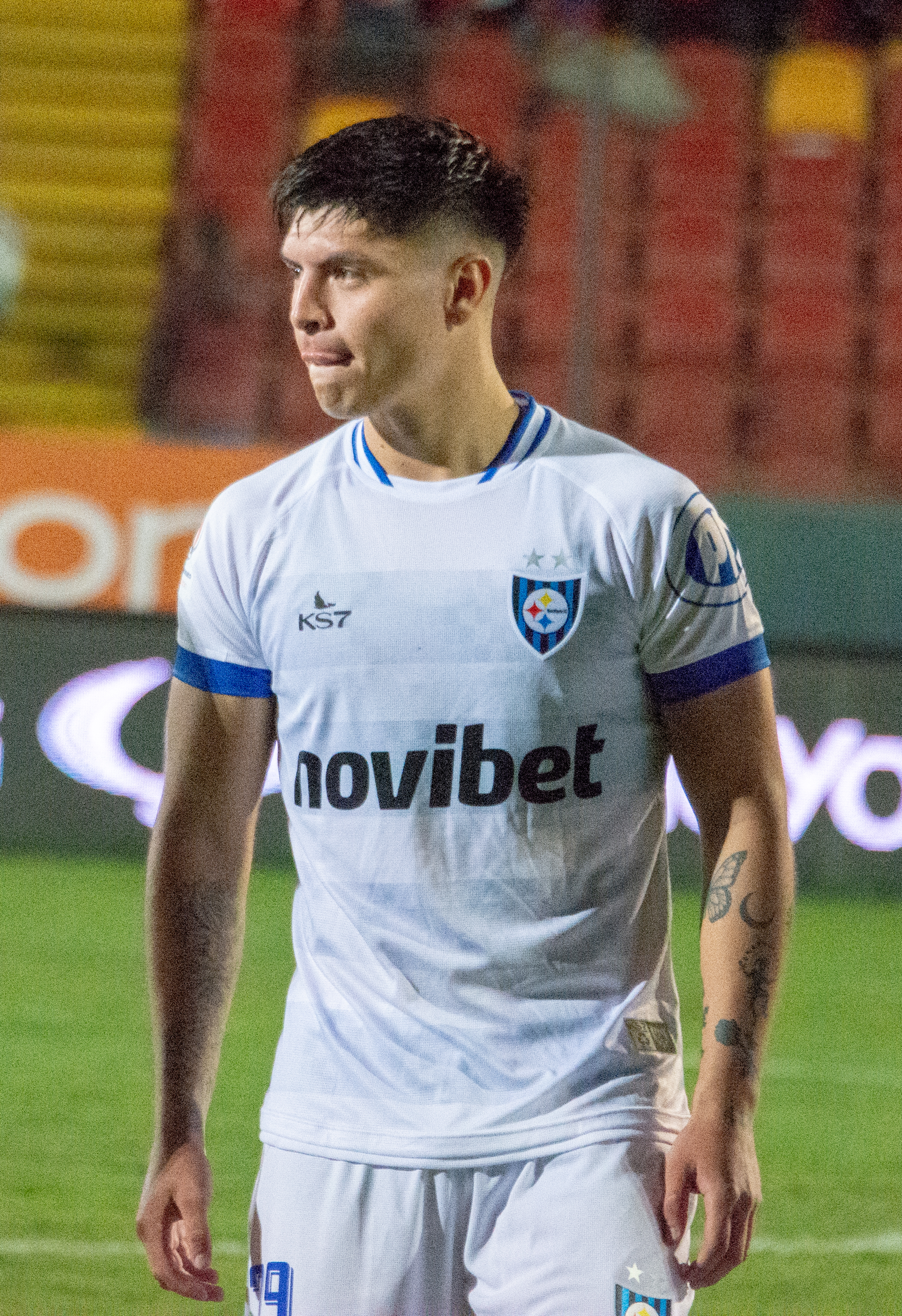
- Torres with Huachipato in 2023

Personal information
- Full name: Claudio Gerardo Torres Gaete
- Date of birth: 30 March 2003 (age 23)
- Place of birth: Talcahuano, Chile
- Height: 1.78 m (5 ft 10 in)
- Position: Right winger

Team information
- Current team: Huachipato
- Number: 29

Youth career
- Huachipato

Senior career*
Years	Team	Apps	(Gls)
2021–	Huachipato	61	(4)
2024	→ Deportes La Serena (loan)	14	(0)

International career^{‡}
2019	Chile U15		
- * Club domestic league appearances and goals as of 11 December 2025 ‡ National team caps and goals as of 12 May 2022

Claudio Gerardo Torres Gaete (born 30 March 2003) is a Chilean professional footballer who plays as a right winger for Huachipato.

== Club career ==
A product of Huachipato youth system, Torres can play as a winger both in attack and in midfield. He made his professional debut in the 2021 Copa Chile match versus San Antonio Unido on June 23, 2021, and scored by first time in the match versus Deportes Temuco of the same tournament on July 5.

In the second half of 2024, Torres was loaned out to Deportes La Serena in the Primera B.

== International career ==
Torres took part of the Chile U15 squad at the UEFA U-16 Development Tournament in Finland in April 2019. Since 2021, he has been frequently called up to training microcycles of Chile at under-20 level.

== Honours ==
Huachipato

- Chilean Primera División: 2023
- Copa Chile: 2025

Deportes La Serena

- Primera B de Chile: 2024
