= Gabriel Norambuena =

Chilean footballer (born 2003)

Personal information
- Full name: Gabriel Adonis Norambuena Moraga
- Date of birth: 7 May 2003 (age 23)
- Place of birth: Santiago, Chile
- Height: 1.76 m (5 ft 9 in)
- Position: Left winger

Team information
- Current team: Unión Española
- Number: 24

Youth career
- Unión Española

Senior career*
Years	Team	Apps	(Gls)
2021–	Unión Española	84	(3)

International career^{‡}
2021–2023	Chile U20	17	(3)
- * Club domestic league appearances and goals as of 11 March 2026 ‡ National team caps and goals as of 20 February 2023

Gabriel Adonis Norambuena Moraga (born 7 May 2003), nicknamed Nora, is a Chilean professional footballer who plays as a left winger for Primera B de Chile club Unión Española.

== Career ==
=== Club career ===
A product of Unión Española youth system, Norambuena made his professional debut in the 2020 Chilean Primera División match versus Cobresal on 15 February 2021, a meeting that he played 19 minutes in during a 4–1 defeat. In October 2021, he signed his first contract as a professional footballer at the age of 18.

=== International career ===
In December 2021, Norambuena represented Chile U20 at the friendly tournament Copa Rául Coloma Rivas, playing the three matches, and at four friendly matches against Paraguay U20 and Peru U20 on 2022. In September 2022, he made two appearances in the Costa Cálida Supercup. In 2023, he made four appearances in the South American U-20 Championship.

== Personal life ==
He has stated that his enthusiasm for playing football comes from his family, as his grandfather, uncles and brothers have all played it as well as his mother is a sportswoman. His football model is Gareth Bale.
