= Gerardo Navarrete =

Chilean footballer (born 1994)

Personal information
- Full name: Gerardo Ignacio Navarrete Barrientos
- Date of birth: 14 July 1994 (age 32)
- Place of birth: Penco, Chile
- Height: 1.75 m (5 ft 9 in)
- Position: Midfielder

Team information
- Current team: Lota Schwager

Youth career
- Universidad de Concepción

Senior career*
Years	Team	Apps	(Gls)
2009–2014	Universidad de Concepción	46	(0)
2014–2017	Granada B	69	(3)
2014–2015	→ Cádiz (loan)	32	(0)
2017–2018	Hércules	22	(1)
2018–2021	O'Higgins	17	(0)
2019	→ Coquimbo Unido (loan)	13	(2)
2021	→ Unión Española (loan)	16	(2)
2022	Deportes Concepción	7	(1)
2023	Trasandino	7	(0)
2024	Manchego	19	(1)
2025	Cobreloa	18	(1)
2026–	Lota Schwager	0	(0)

International career
2010–2011	Chile U17	9	(0)
- * Club domestic league appearances and goals as of 25 January 2026

Gerardo Ignacio Navarrete Barrientos (born 14 July 1994) is a Chilean footballer who plays as a midfielder for Lota Schwager.

== Club career ==
Born in Penco, Navarrete joined Universidad de Concepción youth setup at a young age. He made his first-team debut on 22 November 2009, aged only 15, starting in a 1–2 home loss against Colo Colo. At the Concepción–based side he won the Primera B title (second tier) in 2013.

On 18 June 2014 Navarrete moved abroad and joined Spanish side Granada CF B, being immediately loaned to Cádiz CF for a year.

In July 2023, he signed with Trasandino de Los Andes.

In 2024, Navarrete returned to Spain and signed with Manchego in the Segunda Federación.

Back in Chile, Navarrete joined Cobreloa for the 2025 season. The next year, he joined Lota Schwager in the Segunda División Profesional de Chile.

== International career ==
Navarrete represented Chile U17 at the 2010 South American Games.

== Honours ==
Universidad de Concepción

- Primera B: 2013
