= Álvaro Delgado (footballer) =

Chilean footballer (born 1995)

Personal information
- Full name: Álvaro Alejandro Delgado Sciaraffia
- Date of birth: 13 May 1995 (age 31)
- Place of birth: Iquique, Chile
- Position: Midfielder

Team information
- Current team: Cobreloa
- Number: 22

Youth career
- Municipal Iquique
- 2010–2012: Deportes Iquique

Senior career*
Years	Team	Apps	(Gls)
2012–2017	Deportes Iquique	11	(0)
2016–2017	→ Ñublense (loan)	6	(0)
2017	Municipal Alto Hospicio	14	(26)
2018	Coquimbo Unido	24	(4)
2019–2021	Audax Italiano	30	(2)
2022	Rangers	17	(1)
2023–2024	Deportes Iquique	35	(1)
2024	Deportes La Serena	12	(1)
2025–	Cobreloa	0	(0)
- * Club domestic league appearances and goals as of 4 January 2025

Álvaro Alejandro Delgado Sciaraffia (born 13 May 1995) is a Chilean footballer who plays as a midfielder for Cobreloa.

== Career ==
Born in Iquique, Chile, Delgado is a product of local club Deportes Iquique. After playing on loan for Ñublense in 2016–17, Delgado represented Municipal Alto Hospicio during the second half of 2017, winning the Torneo Piloto Zona Norte. The next year, he signed with Coquimbo Unido.

After winning the 2024 Primera B de Chile with Deportes La Serena, Delgado switched to Cobreloa for the 2025 season.

== Honours ==
Deportes Iquique

- Copa Chile: 2013–14

Municipal Alto Hospicio

- Torneo Piloto Zona Norte: 2017

Coquimbo Unido

- Primera B de Chile: 2018

Deportes La Serena

- Primera B de Chile: 2024

Cobreloa

- Primera B de Chile: 2026

Individual

- Torneo Piloto Zona Norte Top Goalscorer: 2017
