= Luis Acevedo =

Uruguayan footballer (born 1996)

Personal information
- Full name: Luis Miguel Acevedo Tabárez
- Date of birth: 5 October 1996 (age 30)
- Place of birth: Montevideo, Uruguay
- Height: 1.72 m (5 ft 8 in)
- Position: Forward

Team information
- Current team: Deportes Temuco
- Number: 9

Youth career
- Liverpool Montevideo
- Cerro

Senior career*
Years	Team	Apps	(Gls)
2018–2019	Cerro	12	(6)
2019–2021	Peñarol	29	(8)
2021	→ Danubio (loan)	20	(5)
2022–2023	Rentistas	32	(7)
2023	→ Deportes Temuco (loan)	32	(12)
2024–	Deportes Temuco	0	(0)
- * Club domestic league appearances and goals as of 30 January 2024

Luis Miguel Acevedo Tabárez (born 5 October 1996) is a Uruguayan professional footballer who plays as a forward for Deportes Temuco in the Primera B de Chile.

== Career ==
On 7 February 2019, Acevedo joined Peñarol on a one-year contract with a possibility of extension at the end of it.

== Personal life ==
Luis is the elder brother of New York City midfielder Nicolás Acevedo.

== Career statistics ==
=== Club ===
As of 8 March 2024

Club	Season	League			Cup		Continental		Other		Total	
Club	Season	Division	Apps	Goals	Apps	Goals	Apps	Goals	Apps	Goals	Apps	Goals
Cerro	2017	Uruguayan Primera División	0	0	—		—		—		0	0
Cerro	2018	Uruguayan Primera División	12	6	—		—		—		12	6
Cerro	Total		12	6	—		—		—		12	6
Peñarol	2019	Uruguayan Primera División	17	8	—		4 (Note: Two appearances in Copa Libertadores and two appearances in Copa Sudamericana.)	0	2 (Note: Appearances in league playoffs.)	0	23	8
Peñarol	2020	Uruguayan Primera División	12	0	—		6 (Note: Four appearances in Copa Libertadores, Two appearances in Copa Sudameriacana)	0	—		18	0
Peñarol	2021	Uruguayan Primera División	—		—		0	0	—		0	0
Peñarol	Total		29	8	—		10	0	2	0	41	8
Danubio (loan)	2021	Uruguayan Segunda División	20	5	—		—		—		20	5
Danubio (loan)	Total		20	5	—		—		—		20	5
Rentistas	2022	Uruguayan Primera División	32	7	—		—		—		32	7
Rentistas	2023	Uruguayan Primera División	0	0	—		—		—		0	0
Rentistas	Total		32	7	—		—		—		32	7
Deportes Temuco (loan)	2023	Primera B de Chile	32	12	5	4	—		—		37	16
Deportes Temuco	2024	Primera B de Chile	1	0	0	0	—		—		1	0
Deportes Temuco	Total		33	12	5	4	—		—		38	16
Career total			126	38	5	4	10	0	2	0	143	42
