= Marcos Camarda =

Uruguayan footballer (born 2000)

Personal information
- Full name: Marcos Patricio Camarda Télis
- Date of birth: 22 November 2000 (age 25)
- Place of birth: Montevideo, Uruguay
- Height: 1.81 m (5 ft 11 in)
- Position: Striker

Team information
- Current team: Santiago Wanderers
- Number: 9

Youth career
- Progreso
- Danubio
- Boca Juniors
- 2019–2020: Peñarol

Senior career*
Years	Team	Apps	(Gls)
2020–2022	Sud América	52	(12)
2022	→ Recreativo Granada (loan)	14	(4)
2022–2023	Deportivo Maldonado	21	(5)
2023–2025	San Marcos	56	(21)
2024	→ River Plate Montevideo (loan)	14	(3)
2026–	Santiago Wanderers	0	(0)
- * Club domestic league appearances and goals as of 19 December 2025

Marcos Patricio Camarda Télis (born 22 January 2000) is a Uruguayan footballer who plays as a striker for Chilean club Santiago Wanderers.

== Early life ==
Camarda was born in 2000 in Uruguay. He grew up in Montevideo, Uruguay.

== Career ==
In 2023, Camarda signed for Chilean side San Marcos de Arica. He was regarded as one of the club's most important players. In the second half of 2024, he renewed with them on a deal until 2025 and was loaned out to River Plate Montevideo.

Camarda signed with Santiago Wanderers for the 2026 season.

== Style of play ==
Camarda mainly operates as a striker. He has been described as having "power and goal vision as his greatest virtues".
