= Josepablo Monreal =

Chilean footballer (born 1996)

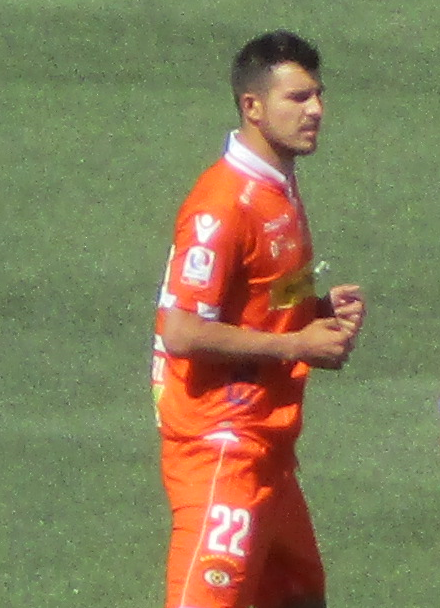
- Monreal with Cobreloa in 2016

Personal information
- Full name: Josepablo Monreal Villablanca
- Date of birth: 1 April 1996 (age 30)
- Place of birth: Santiago, Chile
- Height: 1.90 m (6 ft 3 in)
- Position: Striker

Team information
- Current team: Deportes Antofagasta

Youth career
- 2005–2010: Colo-Colo
- 2015: Monterrey
- 2010–2016: Universidad Católica

Senior career*
Years	Team	Apps	(Gls)
2015–2016	Universidad Católica	0	(0)
2016	Cobreloa	14	(4)
2017	Curicó Unido	7	(1)
2017–2018	Dorados	16	(2)
2018–2020	Unión La Calera	29	(6)
2020	→ Cobreloa (loan)	17	(1)
2021	Rangers	27	(0)
2022	SJK	17	(3)
2022	SJK II	1	(0)
2023	Unión San Felipe	24	(10)
2024	Suwon FC	11	(0)
2024	Chungnam Asan	16	(4)
2025	Santiago Wanderers	21	(1)
2026–	Deportes Antofagasta	0	(0)
- * Club domestic league appearances and goals as of 9 January 2026

Josepablo Monreal Villablanca (Spanish pronunciation: [xoseˈpaβlo monreˈal]; born 1 April 1996) is a Chilean professional footballer who plays as striker for Primera B de Chile club Deportes Antofagasta.

== Career ==
His first formative incursion to professional football began in Colo-Colo in 2005, in this club he won the Torneo ANFP Sub-11 año 2007 with 22 goal scored.

He changed of formative club in 2010 to Universidad Católica, after his successfully ingress in a massive test, approved by Hugo Balladares, who he was a Coach in this football club at that time. In this club he won the ANFP Sub-15 in 2011, with 35 matches and 22 goal scored. He was awarded as top striker of the Campeonato Sub-17 in 2013, and Campeonato sub-19 in 2014.

He was invited to train with the Mexican Professional football club Monterrey in 2015.

He participated in Copa Chivas and Copa Nike, international tournaments.

He began his professional career in Club de Deportes Cobreloa in 2016, he signs for this club for Primera B de Chile season 2016–17. He made his professional debut in Cobreloa vs. Deportes Antofagasta match, valid for first round of Copa Chile 2016 tournament. He scored his first goal in his career in his second professional match against Deportes Antofagasta, valid for Copa Chile 2016 tournament.

In 2022, Monreal had a stint in Europe with Finnish Veikkausliiga side SJK for the 2022 season. He left the club at the end of the year.

In 2023, he returned to his homeland and joined Unión San Felipe.

On 11 January 2024, Monreal signed with South Korean club Suwon FC.

In 2025, Monreal returned to his homeland and joined Santiago Wanderers. The next season, he switched to Deportes Antofagasta.

== Personal life ==
Josepablo is the older brother of the footballers Diego and Sebastián Monreal.

== Career statistics ==
=== Club ===
As of match played 22 September 2024

Club	Season	League			Cup		Continental		Other		Total	
Club	Season	Division	Apps	Goals	Apps	Goals	Apps	Goals	Apps	Goals	Apps	Goals
Cobreloa	2016–17	Primera B de Chile	14	4	6	3	—		—		20	7
Curicó Unido	2016–17	Primera B de Chile	7	1	—		—		—		7	1
Dorados	2017–18	Ascenso MX	16	2	7	2	—		—		23	4
Unión La Calera	2018	Chilean Primera División	14	4	—		—		—		14	4
Unión La Calera	2019	Chilean Primera División	15	2	2	0	1 (Note: Appearance(s) in Copa Sudamericana)	0	—		18	2
Unión La Calera	Total		29	6	2	0	1	0	—		32	6
Cobreloa (loan)	2019	Primera B de Chile	1	0	—		—		—		1	0
Cobreloa (loan)	2020	Primera B de Chile	16	1	—		—		—		16	1
Cobreloa (loan)	Total		17	1	—		—		—		17	1
Rangers de Talca	2021	Primera B de Chile	27	0	5	1	—		—		32	1
SJK	2022	Veikkausliiga	17	3	1	0	0	0	5 (Note: Appearance(s) in Finnish League Cup)	1	23	4
SJK II	2022	Ykkönen	1	0	—		—		—		1	0
Unión San Felipe	2023	Primera B de Chile	25	10	2	2	—		—		27	12
Suwon FC	2024	K League 1	11	0	—		—		—		11	0
Chungnam Asan	2024	K League 2	13	4	0	0	—		—		13	4
Career total			177	31	23	9	1	0	5	1	196	40
