= Gustavo Gotti =

Argentine footballer

Personal information
- Full name: Gustavo Gotti
- Date of birth: 20 October 1993 (age 33)
- Place of birth: Córdoba, Argentina
- Height: 1.80 m (5 ft 11 in)
- Position: Forward

Team information
- Current team: Cobreloa

Youth career
- Instituto

Senior career*
Years	Team	Apps	(Gls)
2011–2017	Instituto	112	(31)
2013–2014	→ Las Palmas (loan)	24	(11)
2017–2021	O'Higgins	41	(7)
2018	→ Deportes Temuco (loan)	11	(0)
2018	→ Unión San Felipe (loan)	14	(3)
2019	→ Deportes Santa Cruz (loan)	12	(8)
2021–2022	Fernández Vial	46	(9)
2023	Cobreloa	27	(10)
2024	Rangers	33	(8)
2025–	Cobreloa	78	(36)
- * Club domestic league appearances and goals as of 25 December 2024

Gustavo Gotti (born 20 October 1993) is an Argentine professional footballer who plays as a forward for Chilean club Cobreloa.

== Career ==
He made his debut against Atlético Policial on a 4–1 loss for the Copa Argentina in 2011 with Dario Franco as head coach. He scored his first goal for Instituto on a 3–2 win against Sarmiento in March 2013. In July 2013 he was loaned to Las Palmas for one year. He scored his first hat-trick for the club on a win 3–1 win against Argentino Penarol at Estadio Mario Alberto Kempes on September 27, 2013. He scored his 4th goal against Racing de Cordoba. He is currently the top scorer for the club with 14 goals. After the one-year loan at Las Palmas, Gotti returns to Instituto scoring his second goal for the club against Arsenal de Sarandi on a 3–1 win. On November 5 he scores the winning goal, 2–1 against Boca Unidos on the last minute of the game. ( His third official goal at Instituto (2- Nacional B -- 1- Copa Arg) ). Gotti scored his 4th goal against Aldosivi on November 30, 2014 (first goal at home). New coach Carlos Mazzola has showed confidence on the striker for his well performance and decides to give him another chance as a starter vs Guarani Antonio Franco in the last game of 2014, Gotti did not fail and scored his 5th goal for the club on a 2–1 win for Instituto. In 2015, he scored his penalty kick against Belgrano de Cordoba to advance on the Copa Argentina. On May 31, he scored his most celebrated goal against Douglas Haig in the last minute of the game at Alta Cordoba home stadium which meant the 3-2 winning score. He scored once more on the victory of his team 2 to 0 against Club Sportivo Estudiantes off a corner kick. He later scored vs Los Andes twice, Patronato, Juventud Unida, Gimnasia de Jujuy, and Club Sportivo Estudiantes finishing with 9 goals in the 2015 season. In 2016, he scored the winning goal (2–1) at Estadio Mario Alberto Kempes in a pre-season match vs Talleres de Cordoba.

In 2023, Gotti played for Cobreloa in the Primera B de Chile, winning the league title and getting promotion to the top division. The next season, he switched to Rangers de Talca. He returned to Cobreloa in 2025.

== Personal life ==
Gotti got Chilean nationality by residence in July 2026.

== Career statistics ==
As of 9 August 2026

Club statistics
Club	Season	League		National Cup		Continental		Other		Total	
Club	Season	App	Goals	App	Goals	App	Goals	App	Goals	App	Goals
Instituto de Córdoba	2011–12	0	0	1	0	0	0	0	0	1	0
Instituto de Córdoba	2012–13	12	1	1	0	0	0	0	0	13	1
Las Palmas	2013–2014	21	11	3	3	0	0	0	0	24	14
Instituto de Córdoba	2014	9	3	2	1	0	0	0	0	11	4
Instituto de Córdoba	2015	30	9	7	0	0	0	0	0	37	9
Total		72	24	8	4	0	0	0	0	87	28

== Honours ==
Cobreloa

- Primera B de Chile (2): 2023, 2026
