= 2024 Copa Chile =

Copa Chile Coca-Cola Sin Azúcar 2024

Tournament details
- Country: Chile
- Dates: 27 April – 20 November 2024
- Teams: 79

Final positions
- Champions: Universidad de Chile (6th title)
- Runners-up: Ñublense
- Copa Libertadores: Ñublense

Tournament statistics
- Matches played: 119
- Goals scored: 367 (3.08 per match)
- Top goal scorer(s): Diego Coelho; Julián Brea (6 goals each)

The 2024 Copa Chile (officially known as Copa Chile Coca-Cola Sin Azúcar 2024 due to its sponsorship), was the 44th edition of the Copa Chile, the country's national football cup tournament. The tournament began on 27 April and ended with the final match on 20 November 2024.

Universidad de Chile won their sixth title in this competition, and first since 2015, by defeating Ñublense 1–0 in the final match. Colo-Colo were the defending champions, but were eliminated by Magallanes in the Central–South Zone's regional finals.

== Format ==
For this edition, the Copa Chile kept the format implemented in 2023, with a preliminary stage involving amateur clubs affiliated to ANFA, a regional stage where teams from Primera División, Primera B, and Segunda División Profesional entered the competition comprised by four geographical zones of 16 teams, and a national stage involving the four regional stage winners. In each regional zone, four rounds are played: round of 16, quarter-finals, semi-finals, and the finals; the round of 16 matches were played as single-legged ties, whilst the other rounds were played in a double-legged fashion. In the national stage, the regional winners played two semi-finals with their winners playing the single-match final to decide the champion.

In addition to that, the 2024 Copa Chile introduced an opening match, which involved a team representing the Juan Fernández Islands and Primera B side Santiago Wanderers, played in San Juan Bautista, Juan Fernández.

== Prizes ==
The champions of this edition will be entitled to play the 2025 Supercopa de Chile against the 2024 Campeonato Nacional champions and would also earn the right to compete in the 2025 Copa Libertadores, taking the Chile 4 berth which enables them to enter the second stage of that competition. However, since Universidad de Chile had already qualified for the Copa Libertadores through league performance, the berth was awarded to the other finalist side, Ñublense, regardless of the outcome of the final.

== Schedule ==
Round		Draw date	First leg	Second leg
Preliminary stage		17 April 2024	27–29 April 2024	1–5 May 2024
Regional stage	Round of 16	26 April 2024	15 June – 1 September 2024	
Regional stage	Quarter-finals	26 April 2024	22 June – 4 September 2024	27 June – 8 September 2024
Regional stage	Semi-finals	26 April 2024	6 July – 9 October 2024	11 July – 16 October 2024
Regional stage	Finals	26 April 2024	4 September – 23 October 2024	8 September – 29 October 2024
National stage	Semi-finals	26 April 2024	9 October – 13 November 2024	13 October – 17 November 2024
National stage	Final	26 April 2024	20 November 2024	

== Teams ==
79 clubs took part in this edition of the Copa Chile: 16 from the Primera División, 16 from the Primera B, 14 from the Segunda División Profesional, 14 from Tercera A, 16 from regional amateur leagues, and three invited teams.

=== Primera A ===
- Audax Italiano
- Cobreloa
- Cobresal
- Colo-Colo
- Coquimbo Unido
- Deportes Copiapó
- Deportes Iquique
- Everton
- Huachipato
- Ñublense
- O'Higgins
- Palestino
- Unión Española
- Unión La Calera
- Universidad Católica
- Universidad de Chile

=== Primera B ===
- Barnechea
- Curicó Unido
- Deportes Antofagasta
- Deportes La Serena
- Deportes Limache
- Deportes Recoleta
- Deportes Santa Cruz
- Deportes Temuco
- Magallanes
- Rangers
- San Luis
- San Marcos de Arica
- Santiago Morning
- Santiago Wanderers
- Unión San Felipe
- Universidad de Concepción

=== Segunda División ===
- Concón National
- Deportes Concepción
- Deportes Linares
- Deportes Melipilla
- Deportes Puerto Montt
- Deportes Rengo
- Fernández Vial
- General Velásquez
- Lautaro de Buin
- Provincial Osorno
- Provincial Ovalle
- Real San Joaquín
- San Antonio Unido
- Trasandino

=== Tercera División A ===
- Brujas de Salamanca
- Chimbarongo
- Colchagua
- Comunal Cabrero
- Constitución Unido
- Deportes Colina
- Deportes Quillón
- Deportes Valdivia
- Iberia
- Imperial Unido
- Municipal Mejillones
- Municipal Puente Alto
- Santiago City
- Unión Compañías

=== Regional amateur clubs ===
- Alas Portuarias
- Barcelona
- Central Norte
- Colo-Colo (Chile Chico)
- El Lucero
- Ferroviarios
- Halcones
- Juvenil Seminario
- Legua Juniors
- Marcos Trincado
- Miramar
- Norte Unido
- Presidente Ibáñez
- San Antonio Unido (Temuco)
- Unión Wanderers
- Vicente Pérez

=== Invited teams ===
- 11 de Septiembre
- Glorias Navales
- Juan Fernández Islands

== Preliminary stage ==
The pairings for the preliminary stage were announced by the ANFA on 17 April 2024. The participating clubs were split into two groups, one of them made of regional ANFA clubs and the other one featuring the Tercera División A teams. They were then drawn against a team in their group, according to geographical and safety criteria. Ties in this round were played over two legs, with the team with the most points in each tie advancing to the national stage. If both teams were tied in points, a penalty shootout was held to decide the winning team. Matches in this round were played from 27 April to 5 May 2024.

=== Opening match ===
The opening match of the competition was played on 27 April 2024.

27 April 2024	Juan Fernández Islands	1–2	Santiago Wanderers	San Juan Bautista
12:30 UTC−4	O. Salas 74' (pen.)	Report	Ponce 71'; Pereyra 86'	Stadium: Municipal de Juan Fernández; Referee: Nicolás Millas

=== Tercera División preliminaries ===
Teams			Scores		
Team 1	Points	Team 2	1st leg	2nd leg	Penalty shootout (if needed)
Municipal Mejillones	3:3	Deportes Colina	0–1	1–0	3–2
Unión Compañías	1:4	Brujas de Salamanca	1–1	0–2	—
Chimbarongo	3:3	Santiago City	4–2	0–4	1–4
Colchagua	1:4	Municipal Puente Alto	2–2	2–3	—
Deportes Quillón	4:1	Constitución Unido	4–3	1–1	—
Comunal Cabrero	3:3	Iberia	1–0	1–2	5–4
Imperial Unido	4:1	Deportes Valdivia	1–0	0–0	—

Source: En El Camarín

=== Regional amateur preliminaries ===
The regional representatives from Arica y Parinacota (11 de Septiembre), Tarapacá (Norte Unido), Antofagasta (Central Norte), Atacama (Barcelona), Aysén, and Magallanes (Presidente Ibáñez) did not participate in this stage and instead were given a bye to the regional stage given the condition of remoteness of their respective regions.

Teams			Scores		
Team 1	Points	Team 2	1st leg	2nd leg	Penalty shootout (if needed)
Unión Glorias Navales	4:1	Miramar	1–1	2–0	—
El Lucero	0:6	Juvenil Seminario	1–3	0–1	—
San Antonio Unido (Temuco)	6:0	Ferroviarios	3–1	2–1	—
Unión Wanderers	2:2	Vicente Pérez	0–0	1–1	1–4

Source: En El Camarín

=== Aysén preliminary ===
The Aysén regional association opted to hold a triangular tournament between its three representatives (Alas Portuarias, Colo-Colo (Chile Chico), and Halcones) to decide the Aysén representative in the regional stage of the competition. Matches were played from 27 April to 1 May 2024 in Coyhaique.

Pos	Team	Pld	W	D	L	GF	GA	GD	Pts	Qualification	ALP	HAL	CCC
1	Alas Portuarias	2	2	0	0	4	2	+2	6	Advance to Regional stage	—	—	3–2
2	Halcones	2	1	0	1	4	2	+2	3		0–1	—	4–1
3	Colo-Colo (Chile Chico)	2	0	0	2	3	7	−4	0		—	—	—

Source: En El Camarín
Legend: Blue = home team win; Yellow = draw; Red = away team win.
Rules for classification: 1) Points, 2) Goal difference, 3) Goals for, 4) Drawing of lots.

== Regional stage ==
The draw for the regional stage was held on 26 April 2024. The 64 participating teams were split into four zones (North, Central-North, Central-South, and South) and drawn against a team from their same regional zone. Ties in the round of 16 will be single-legged, ties from the quarter-finals onwards will be double-legged.

=== North Zone ===
==== Bracket ====
Round of 16
Central Norte	1
17	Deportes Antofagasta	5
Norte Unido	1
19	Deportes Iquique	3
11 de Septiembre	0
29	San Marcos de Arica	4
Barcelona	0
7	Cobreloa	3
44	Trasandino (p)	2 (4)
20	Deportes La Serena	2 (3)
Brujas de Salamanca	0 (0)
15	Coquimbo Unido (p)	0 (3)
Municipal Mejillones	0
30	Deportes Copiapó	4
45	Provincial Ovalle	1
13	Cobresal	3

Quarter-finals
17	Deportes Antofagasta	2	1	3
19	Deportes Iquique	1	3	4
29	San Marcos de Arica	0	0	0
7	Cobreloa	1	0	1
44	Trasandino	1	0	1
15	Coquimbo Unido	1	1	2
30	Deportes Copiapó	2	1	3
13	Cobresal	2	3	5

Semi-finals
19	Deportes Iquique	2	2	4
7	Cobreloa	0	0	0
15	Coquimbo Unido	4	0	4
13	Cobresal	0	1	1

Finals
19	Deportes Iquique	1	0	1
15	Coquimbo Unido	2	1	3

==== Round of 16 ====
15 June 2024	Municipal Mejillones	0–4	Deportes Copiapó	Mejillones
12:00 UTC−4		Report	Pais 8'; Soto 43'; Medel 68'; Díaz 84'	Stadium: Municipal Rolando Cortés; Referee: Miguel Araos

15 June 2024	Barcelona	0–3	Cobreloa	Copiapó
15:00 UTC−4		Report	Bravo 33'; Meléndez 79'; Leiva 89'	Stadium: Luis Valenzuela Hermosilla; Referee: Víctor Abarzúa

15 June 2024	11 de Septiembre	0–4	San Marcos de Arica	Arica
20:00 UTC−4		Report	Vicencio 6'; Barrios 13'; Rosales 31'; Guerreño 35'	Stadium: Carlos Dittborn; Referee: Héctor Jona

15 June 2024	Norte Unido	1–3	Deportes Iquique	Iquique
20:00 UTC−4	Peñaranda 81'	Report	Hoyos 44' (pen.); Moya 59'; Delgado 86'	Stadium: Tierra de Campeones; Referee: Felipe González

16 June 2024	Trasandino	2–2 (4–3 p)	Deportes La Serena	Los Andes
12:30 UTC−4	Salazar 37'; Cé. González 82'	Report	Altamirano 55', 79' (pen.)	Stadium: Regional de Los Andes; Referee: Agustín Valenzuela
	Penalties
	Cezar (penalty scored); Rodríguez (penalty missed); Torres (penalty scored); Ca. González (penalty scored); Corral (penalty scored)		(penalty missed) Gallegos; (penalty scored) Meléndez; (penalty scored) Altamirano; (penalty scored) Espinoza; (penalty missed) Guerrero

17 June 2024	Provincial Ovalle	1–3	Cobresal	La Serena
15:00 UTC−4	Ormeño 35'	Report	Coelho 6', 13'; Pacheco 67'	Stadium: La Portada; Referee: José Cabero

17 June 2024	Central Norte	1–5	Deportes Antofagasta	Antofagasta
19:00 UTC−4	Pozo 50'	Report	Souper 10'; E. Díaz 43' (pen.), 52', 63'; Espinoza 84'	Stadium: Regional Calvo y Bascuñán; Referee: Rodrigo Rivera

20 June 2024	Brujas de Salamanca	0–0 (0–3 p)	Coquimbo Unido	Salamanca
16:00 UTC−4		Report		Stadium: Municipal; Attendance: 3,000; Referee: Manuel Vergara
	Penalties
	S. Hernández (penalty missed); Pastén (penalty missed); Carrasco (penalty missed)		(penalty missed) Camargo; (penalty scored) Henríquez; (penalty scored) Glaby; (penalty scored) E. Hernández

==== Quarter-finals ====
Team 1	Agg.	Team 2	1st leg	2nd leg
San Marcos de Arica	0–1	Cobreloa	0–1	0–0
Deportes Antofagasta	3–4	Deportes Iquique	2–1	1–3
Deportes Copiapó	3–5	Cobresal	2–2	1–3
Trasandino	1–2	Coquimbo Unido	1–1	0–1

===== First leg =====
22 June 2024	Deportes Copiapó	2–2	Cobresal	Copiapó
12:30 UTC−4	Díaz 24', 27'	Report	Lobos 81'; Coelho 84'	Stadium: Luis Valenzuela Hermosilla; Referee: Diego Flores

22 June 2024	San Marcos de Arica	0–1	Cobreloa	Arica
20:00 UTC−4		Report	Palma 34'	Stadium: Carlos Dittborn; Attendance: 1,390; Referee: Fernando Véjar

23 June 2024	Deportes Antofagasta	2–1	Deportes Iquique	Antofagasta
12:30 UTC−4	E. Díaz 15'; Quiroga 87'	Report	Pino 42' (pen.)	Stadium: Regional Calvo y Bascuñán; Referee: Francisco Gilabert

23 June 2024	Trasandino	1–1	Coquimbo Unido	Los Andes
15:00 UTC−4	Cezar 75'	Report	Cornejo 55'	Stadium: Regional de Los Andes; Referee: Yerko Montenegro

===== Second leg =====
28 June 2024	Cobreloa	0–0 (1–0 agg.)	San Marcos de Arica	Calama
20:30 UTC−4		Report		Stadium: Zorros del Desierto; Referee: Felipe González

28 June 2024	Deportes Iquique	3–1 (4–3 agg.)	Deportes Antofagasta	Iquique
20:30 UTC−4	Pino 12'; González 45+1'; Farfán 90+6'	Report	Ubilla 90+8'	Stadium: Tierra de Campeones; Referee: Diego Flores

29 June 2024	Coquimbo Unido	1–0 (2–1 agg.)	Trasandino	Coquimbo
12:30 UTC−4	Mundaca 12'	Report		Stadium: Municipal Francisco Sánchez Rumoroso; Referee: Francisco Soriano

29 June 2024	Cobresal	3–1 (5–3 agg.)	Deportes Copiapó	El Salvador
15:00 UTC−4	Coelho 1', 54', 78'	Report	Quinteros 64'	Stadium: El Cobre; Referee: Mario Salvo

==== Semi-finals ====
Team 1	Agg.	Team 2	1st leg	2nd leg
Deportes Iquique	4–0	Cobreloa	2–0	2–0
Coquimbo Unido	4–1	Cobresal	4–0	0–1

===== First leg =====
6 July 2024	Coquimbo Unido	4–0	Cobresal	Coquimbo
15:00 UTC−4	Fernández 31'; Chávez 45+1'; Chandía 50'; Azócar 80'	Report		Stadium: Municipal Francisco Sánchez Rumoroso; Referee: Reinerio Alvarado

6 July 2024	Deportes Iquique	2–0	Cobreloa	Iquique
20:00 UTC−4	Puch 31' (pen.); González 50'	Report		Stadium: Tierra de Campeones; Attendance: 7,990; Referee: Benjamín Saravia

===== Second leg =====
12 July 2024	Cobreloa	0–2 (0–4 agg.)	Deportes Iquique	Calama
20:00 UTC−4		Report	C. González 19'; Delgado 69'	Stadium: Zorros del Desierto; Referee: Fernando Véjar

14 July 2024	Cobresal	1–0 (1–4 agg.)	Coquimbo Unido	El Salvador
15:00 UTC−4	Lobos 45+2'	Report		Stadium: El Cobre; Referee: Juan Sepúlveda

==== Finals ====
4 September 2024	Deportes Iquique	1–2	Coquimbo Unido	Iquique
20:30 UTC−4	Hoyos 57'	Report	Chávez 2', 25'	Stadium: Tierra de Campeones; Referee: Nicolás Millas

8 September 2024	Coquimbo Unido	1–0 (3–1 agg.)	Deportes Iquique	Coquimbo
18:00 UTC−3	Chávez 6'	Report		Stadium: Municipal Francisco Sánchez Rumoroso; Referee: Francisco Gilabert

=== Central–North Zone ===
==== Bracket ====
Round of 16
Concón National	3
14	Santiago Wanderers	5
Unión Glorias Navales	0
4	Universidad Católica	2
25	Barnechea	1
42	Deportes Limache	0
Santiago City	0
6	Palestino	4
36	Deportes Melipilla	1
23	Unión San Felipe	0
27	San Luis	0
8	Everton	2
37	San Antonio Unido (p)	2 (4)
21	Unión La Calera	2 (3)
Municipal Puente Alto	1
2	Universidad de Chile	5

Quarter-finals
14	Santiago Wanderers	1	2	3
4	Universidad Católica	0	2	2
25	Barnechea	3	0	3
6	Palestino	2	3	5
36	Deportes Melipilla	2	1	3
8	Everton	1	3	4
37	San Antonio Unido	0	0	0
2	Universidad de Chile	0	7	7

Semi-finals
14	Santiago Wanderers	2	1	3
6	Palestino	2	3	5
8	Everton	2	0	2 (3)
2	Universidad de Chile (p)	1	1	2 (4)

Finals
6	Palestino	0	1	1
2	Universidad de Chile	5	0	5

==== Round of 16 ====
15 June 2024	Deportes Melipilla	1–0	Unión San Felipe	Melipilla
15:00 UTC−4	Taiva 42'	Report		Stadium: Soinca Bata; Referee: Eliecer Ortega

16 June 2024	Santiago City	0–4	Palestino	San Joaquín, Santiago
15:00 UTC−4		Report	Bizama 1'; Palacio 52'; Cornejo 57'; Carrasco 61'	Stadium: Municipal; Referee: Nicolás Gamboa

17 June 2024	Municipal Puente Alto	1–5	Universidad de Chile	Ñuñoa, Santiago
19:00 UTC−4	Bravo 1'	Report	Mateos 27'; Cordero 39'; Fernández 53' (pen.); Zaldivia 75'; Assadi 88'	Stadium: Nacional Julio Martínez Prádanos; Referee: Reinerio Alvarado

17 June 2024	Barnechea	1–0	Deportes Limache	La Calera
19:00 UTC−4	Tapia 29'	Report		Stadium: Municipal Nicolás Chahuán Nazar; Referee: Francisco Gilabert

18 June 2024	San Antonio Unido	2–2 (4–3 p)	Unión La Calera	Cartagena
15:00 UTC−4	Cuellar 55', 90+5'	Report	Ponce 22'; Valencia 45+1'	Stadium: Fernando Ross; Referee: José Farías
	Penalties
	Fernández (penalty scored); Cereceda (penalty scored); Maturana (penalty scored); Astete (penalty missed); Gattas (penalty missed); Pontigo (penalty scored)		(penalty scored) Muñoz; (penalty scored) Aued; (penalty missed) Rebolledo; (penalty scored) Valencia; (penalty missed) Romo; (penalty missed) Ortiz

19 June 2024	Concón National	3–5	Santiago Wanderers	Valparaíso
17:30 UTC−4	Leiva 70'; Llanos 84'; Leiton 87'	Report	Vilches 33', 54', 79'; Ponce 74'; Arias 90+4'	Stadium: Elías Figueroa Brander; Referee: Francisco Gaggero

19 June 2024	San Luis	0–2	Everton	Quillota
19:00 UTC−4		Report	Martínez 10', 37'	Stadium: Municipal Lucio Fariña Fernández; Referee: Fernando Véjar

20 June 2024	Unión Glorias Navales	0–2	Universidad Católica	Viña del Mar
17:30 UTC−4		Report	Tapia 17', 66'	Stadium: Sausalito; Referee: Dione Rissios

==== Quarter-finals ====
Team 1	Agg.	Team 2	1st leg	2nd leg
San Antonio Unido	0–7	Universidad de Chile	0–0	0–7
Deportes Melipilla	3–4	Everton	2–1	1–3
Santiago Wanderers	3–2	Universidad Católica	1–0	2–2
Barnechea	3–5	Palestino	3–2	0–3

===== First leg =====
23 June 2024	Barnechea	3–2	Palestino	Lo Barnechea, Santiago
12:00 UTC−4	Tapia 58', 72', 88'	Report	Carrasco 65'; Marabel 90+3'	Stadium: Municipal; Referee: Nicolás Gamboa

23 June 2024	Deportes Melipilla	2–1	Everton	Melipilla
15:00 UTC−4	Ovalle 33', 83'	Report	Martínez 81'	Stadium: Soinca Bata; Referee: Rodrigo Farías

23 June 2024	Santiago Wanderers	1–0	Universidad Católica	Valparaíso
15:00 UTC−4	Valenzuela 90+6'	Report		Stadium: Elías Figueroa Brander; Referee: Benjamín Saravia

28 June 2024	San Antonio Unido	0–0	Universidad de Chile	La Calera
17:00 UTC−4		Report		Stadium: Municipal Nicolás Chahuán Nazar; Referee: Rodrigo Rivera

===== Second leg =====
29 June 2024	Universidad Católica	2–2 (2–3 agg.)	Santiago Wanderers	Rancagua
15:00 UTC−4	Pinares 29'; Canales 57'	Report	Muñoz 90+1'; Duma 90+4'	Stadium: El Teniente; Referee: Francisco Gilabert

30 June 2024	Everton	3–1 (4–3 agg.)	Deportes Melipilla	Viña del Mar
12:30 UTC−4	Madrid 28'; Contreras 39'; Martínez 41'	Report	Taiva 51'	Stadium: Sausalito; Referee: Fabián Reyes

30 June 2024	Palestino	3–0 (5–3 agg.)	Barnechea	La Cisterna, Santiago
15:00 UTC−4	Marabel 65'; Martínez 75'; Linares 82'	Report		Stadium: Municipal; Referee: Nicolás Pozo

1 July 2024	Universidad de Chile	7–0 (7–0 agg.)	San Antonio Unido	Ñuñoa, Santiago
19:00 UTC−4	Palacios 10'; Zaldivia 19'; Vásquez 30', 64'; Assadi 37', 56'; Poblete 86'	Report		Stadium: Nacional Julio Martínez Prádanos; Referee: Franco Jiménez

==== Semi-finals ====
Team 1	Agg.	Team 2	1st leg	2nd leg
Everton	2–2 (3–4 p)	Universidad de Chile	2–1	0–1
Santiago Wanderers	3–5	Palestino	2–2	1–3

===== First leg =====
6 July 2024	Santiago Wanderers	2–2	Palestino	Valparaíso
17:30 UTC−4	Muñoz 40'; Linares 80' (o.g.)	Report	Carrasco 58' (pen.); Linares 59'	Stadium: Elías Figueroa Brander; Referee: Nicolás Gamboa

7 July 2024	Everton	2–1	Universidad de Chile	Viña del Mar
15:00 UTC−4	Cruz 1'; Oyarzún 8'	Report	Zaldivia 69'	Stadium: Sausalito; Referee: Emilio Bastías

===== Second leg =====
12 July 2024	Palestino	3–1 (5–3 agg.)	Santiago Wanderers	La Cisterna, Santiago
15:00 UTC−4	Benítez 14'; Dávila 88'; Fuentes 90+2'	Report	Duma 46'	Stadium: Municipal; Referee: Héctor Jona

14 July 2024	Universidad de Chile	1–0 (2–2 agg.) (4–3 p)	Everton	Ñuñoa, Santiago
17:30 UTC−4	Sepúlveda 72'	Report		Stadium: Nacional Julio Martínez Prádanos; Referee: Diego Flores
	Penalties
	Zaldivia (penalty scored); Guerrero (penalty missed); Sepúlveda (penalty scored); Hormazábal (penalty scored); Díaz (penalty scored)		(penalty scored) Baeza; (penalty scored) Méndez; (penalty scored) Oyarzún; (penalty missed) Campos López; (penalty missed) Berríos

==== Finals ====
5 September 2024	Palestino	0–5	Universidad de Chile	La Cisterna, Santiago
15:00 UTC−4		Report	Guerra 17', 36'; Sepúlveda 48'; Fernández 62'; Palacios 83'	Stadium: Municipal; Referee: Rodrigo Carvajal

9 September 2024	Universidad de Chile	0–1 (5–1 agg.)	Palestino	Independencia, Santiago
19:00 UTC−3		Report	Garro 73'	Stadium: Santa Laura-Universidad SEK; Referee: José Cabero

=== Central–South Zone ===
==== Bracket ====
Round of 16
38	General Velásquez	1
22	Curicó Unido	3
Juvenil Seminario	2
5	Magallanes	5
49	Real San Joaquín (p)	0 (4)
24	Santiago Morning	0 (3)
Marcos Trincado	1
3	Unión Española	5
47	Deportes Rengo	2
35	Deportes Santa Cruz	3
39	Deportes Recoleta	1
10	Audax Italiano	3
40	Lautaro de Buin	0
12	O'Higgins	1
Deportes Quillón	0
1	Colo-Colo	6

Quarter-finals
22	Curicó Unido	1	0	1
5	Magallanes	0	4	4
49	Real San Joaquín	2	0	2
3	Unión Española	2	3	5
35	Deportes Santa Cruz	1	2	3
10	Audax Italiano	1	0	1
12	O'Higgins	2	1	3
1	Colo-Colo	2	3	5

Semi-finals
5	Magallanes	3	5	8
3	Unión Española	0	0	0
35	Deportes Santa Cruz	1	0	1
1	Colo-Colo	1	1	2

Finals
5	Magallanes	3	0	3
1	Colo-Colo	0	0	0

==== Round of 16 ====
15 June 2024	Deportes Recoleta	1–3	Audax Italiano	La Pintana, Santiago
15:00 UTC−4	Carvajal 85'	Report	Ortiz 24'; Quiñones 38', 40'	Stadium: Municipal; Referee: Esteban Molina

15 June 2024	Real San Joaquín	0–0 (4–3 p)	Santiago Morning	San Joaquín, Santiago
15:00 UTC−4		Report		Stadium: Municipal; Referee: Hernán Banda
	Penalties
	Collao (penalty scored); Ugarte (penalty scored); Díaz (penalty scored); Durán (penalty scored)		(penalty scored) Castro; (penalty scored) J. Carreño; (penalty missed) Arancibia; (penalty scored) E. Carreño; (penalty missed) Gatica

16 June 2024	Lautaro de Buin	0–1	O'Higgins	La Pintana, Santiago
15:00 UTC−4		Report	Rabello 90+4'	Stadium: Municipal; Referee: Esteban Molina

16 June 2024	Deportes Rengo	2–3	Deportes Santa Cruz	Rengo
15:00 UTC−4	Recabal 13'; Abarzúa 90+2'	Report	González 6'; Barrera 80'; Ledezma 89'	Stadium: Municipal; Referee: Gustavo Ahumada

16 June 2024	General Velásquez	1–3	Curicó Unido	San Vicente de Tagua Tagua
15:00 UTC−4	Castillo 32'	Report	Ortiz 26'; Escalante 45'; Harbottle 63'	Stadium: Municipal Augusto Rodríguez; Referee: Nicolás Pozo

18 June 2024	Juvenil Seminario	2–5	Magallanes	Talca
19:00 UTC−4	Pardo 38'; Ávila 81'	Report	Rivera 5'; Mancilla 27'; Catalán 30'; Peña 85'; Rodríguez 90+1'	Stadium: Fiscal; Referee: Mathías Riquelme

20 June 2024	Deportes Quillón	0–6	Colo-Colo	Macul, Santiago
12:30 UTC−4		Report	Soto 20'; Cepeda 28'; Oroz 40' (pen.); Vidal 52' (pen.); Palacios 73'; Benegas 86'	Stadium: Monumental David Arellano; Referee: Gastón Philippe

20 June 2024	Marcos Trincado	1–5	Unión Española	Rengo
15:00 UTC−4	Lagos 63'	Report	Carvallo 19', 50'; Frías 23'; Norambuena 46', 69'	Stadium: Municipal; Referee: Francisco Soriano

==== Quarter-finals ====
Team 1	Agg.	Team 2	1st leg	2nd leg
O'Higgins	3–5	Colo-Colo	2–2	1–3
Deportes Santa Cruz	3–1	Audax Italiano	1–1	2–0
Real San Joaquín	2–5	Unión Española	2–2	0–3
Curicó Unido	1–4	Magallanes	1–0	0–4

===== First leg =====
23 June 2024	Deportes Santa Cruz	1–1	Audax Italiano	Santa Cruz
12:30 UTC−4	Muñoz 44' (pen.)	Report	Álvarez 34' (pen.)	Stadium: Municipal Joaquín Muñoz García; Referee: Francisco Soriano

23 June 2024	Real San Joaquín	2–2	Unión Española	San Joaquín, Santiago
15:00 UTC−4	Ibarra 9'; Toro 85'	Report	Aránguiz 50'; Peñailillo 90+3'	Stadium: Municipal; Referee: Mathías Riquelme

23 June 2024	Curicó Unido	1–0	Magallanes	Curicó
15:00 UTC−4	Parada 85'	Report		Stadium: La Granja; Referee: Agustín Valenzuela

23 June 2024	O'Higgins	2–2	Colo-Colo	Rancagua
17:30 UTC−4	Sarrafiore 33'; Castillo 82'	Report	Wiemberg 45+1'; Paiva 88'	Stadium: El Teniente; Referee: Víctor Manzor

===== Second leg =====
27 June 2024	Magallanes	4–0 (4–1 agg.)	Curicó Unido	Rancagua
20:00 UTC−4	Catalán 1'; Walters 62'; Jorquera 67'; Rivera 85'	Report		Stadium: El Teniente; Referee: Reinerio Alvarado

29 June 2024	Unión Española	3–0 (5–2 agg.)	Real San Joaquín	Independencia, Santiago
12:30 UTC−4	Tiznado 4'; Uribe 23'; Frías 49'	Report		Stadium: Santa Laura-Universidad SEK; Referee: Rodrigo Farías

30 June 2024	Audax Italiano	0–2 (1–3 agg.)	Deportes Santa Cruz	Rancagua
15:00 UTC−4		Report	Pinto 70'; Barrera 90+8'	Stadium: El Teniente; Referee: Claudio Díaz

30 June 2024	Colo-Colo	3–1 (5–3 agg.)	O'Higgins	Macul, Santiago
17:30 UTC−4	Pizarro 11'; Cepeda 77', 88'	Report	Auzqui 12'	Stadium: Monumental David Arellano; Referee: Héctor Jona

==== Semi-finals ====
Team 1	Agg.	Team 2	1st leg	2nd leg
Deportes Santa Cruz	1–2	Colo-Colo	1–1	0–1
Magallanes	8–0	Unión Española	3–0	5–0

===== First leg =====
7 July 2024	Magallanes	3–0	Unión Española	San Bernardo, Santiago
12:30 UTC−4	Alfaro 5'; Aránguiz 10'; Vásquez 24'	Report		Stadium: Municipal Luis Navarro Avilés; Referee: Manuel Vergara

7 July 2024	Deportes Santa Cruz	1–1	Colo-Colo	Curicó
17:30 UTC−4	Duma 88'	Report	Vidal 65'	Stadium: La Granja; Referee: José Cabero

===== Second leg =====
13 July 2024	Unión Española	0–5 (0–8 agg.)	Magallanes	Independencia, Santiago
12:30 UTC−4		Report	Jones 17', 45+3'; Abarca 37'; Jorquera 66'; Vicuña 85'	Stadium: Santa Laura-Universidad SEK; Referee: José Cabero

13 July 2024	Colo-Colo	1–0 (2–1 agg.)	Deportes Santa Cruz	Macul, Santiago
17:30 UTC−4	Palacios 60'	Report		Stadium: Monumental David Arellano; Referee: Felipe González

==== Finals ====
7 September 2024	Magallanes	3–0	Colo-Colo	Talca
15:00 UTC−4	Larrivey 3', 21' (pen.), 38'	Report		Stadium: Fiscal; Referee: Nicolás Gamboa

29 October 2024	Colo-Colo	0–0 (0–3 agg.)	Magallanes	Macul, Santiago
18:00 UTC−3		Report		Stadium: Monumental David Arellano; Referee: Diego Flores

=== South Zone ===
==== Bracket ====
Round of 16
Alas Portuarias	0
28	Deportes Puerto Montt	7
48	Provincial Osorno	2 (4)
16	Deportes Temuco (p)	2 (5)
Imperial Unido (p)	2 (4)
33	Fernández Vial	2 (3)
Presidente Ibáñez	0
9	Huachipato	12
34	Deportes Concepción	2
54	Deportes Linares	3
Vicente Pérez	0
11	Universidad de Concepción	3
Comunal Cabrero	0
26	Rangers	10
San Antonio Unido (Temuco)	1
18	Ñublense	4

Quarter-finals
28	Deportes Puerto Montt	2	1	3
16	Deportes Temuco	0	2	2
Imperial Unido	1	0	1
9	Huachipato	2	0	2
54	Deportes Linares	1	0	1
11	Universidad de Concepción	0	0	0
26	Rangers	1	0	1
18	Ñublense	1	4	5

Semi-finals
28	Deportes Puerto Montt	5	0	5
9	Huachipato	1	1	2
54	Deportes Linares	2	1	3
18	Ñublense	1	5	6

Finals
28	Deportes Puerto Montt	1	1	2 (2)
18	Ñublense (p)	1	1	2 (4)

==== Round of 16 ====
15 June 2024	Vicente Pérez	0–3	Universidad de Concepción	Puerto Montt
15:00 UTC−4		Report	Sánchez Sotelo 29'; Cid 39'; Rodríguez 70'	Stadium: Regional de Chinquihue; Referee: Diego Yañez

15 June 2024	Imperial Unido	2–2 (4–3 p)	Fernández Vial	Nueva Imperial
15:00 UTC−4	Zúñiga 10'; B. Díaz 75'	Report	C. Díaz 50'; Gillard 65'	Stadium: El Alto; Referee: Brenda Cisternas
	Penalties
	Zúñiga (penalty scored); Palma (penalty scored); Chamorro (penalty scored); Vargas (penalty scored)		(penalty scored) Concha; (penalty scored) Orellana; (penalty scored) Ávila; (penalty missed) C. Díaz; (penalty missed) Gillard

15 June 2024	Provincial Osorno	2–2 (4–5 p)	Deportes Temuco	Osorno
15:00 UTC−4	Melo 44'; Orellana 56'	Report	Vargas 9' (o.g.); Cortés 10'	Stadium: Rubén Marcos Peralta; Referee: Víctor Manzor
	Penalties
	Orellana (penalty scored); Pezoa (penalty scored); Rojas (penalty scored); Jelves (penalty missed); Ambiado (penalty scored)		(penalty scored) Vega; (penalty scored) Melivilú; (penalty scored) Núñez; (penalty scored) Bustamante; (penalty scored) Urra

16 June 2024	Alas Portuarias	0–7	Deportes Puerto Montt	Puerto Aysén
14:00 UTC−4		Report	Lagos 5'; Zedán 6', 24'; Antiñirre 13', 27'; Vargas 37'; Pérez 90' (pen.)	Stadium: ANFA; Referee: Claudio Díaz

16 June 2024	San Antonio Unido (Temuco)	1–4	Ñublense	Temuco
15:00 UTC−4	Urra 59'	Report	Rubio 13'; Rozas 23'; Herrera 41'; Torrealba 65'	Stadium: Municipal Germán Becker; Referee: Bastián Pavez

23 June 2024	Comunal Cabrero	0–10	Rangers	Talca
15:00 UTC−4		Report	Gotti 4', 12', 75'; González 16', 35'; Araya 23', 44'; Felipe 51'; Alegre 64'; Márquez 72'	Stadium: Fiscal; Referee: Franco Jiménez

26 June 2024	Deportes Concepción	2–3	Deportes Linares	Angol
15:00 UTC−4	Acevedo 15'; Escobar 71'	Report	Rojas 17'; Zúñiga 24'; Peñaloza 46'	Stadium: Alberto Larraguibel Morales; Referee: Yerko Montenegro

1 September 2024	Presidente Ibáñez	0–12	Huachipato	Punta Arenas
13:00 UTC−3		Report	Brea 8', 58', 61', 82', 85'; Sáez 25', 63', 81'; Rodríguez 45'; Briceño 49'; Vega 64'; Díaz 81'	Stadium: Municipal Antonio Ríspoli Díaz; Referee: Diego Flores
Note: The match had been originally scheduled for 15 June 2024, 12:45 local time, but was suspended due to harsh weather conditions. It was rescheduled to 30 June 2024, 12:00 local time but was again suspended due to poor weather. Although Huachipato had been declared as winners by the Football Federation of Chile and the ANFP given the impossibility of a further rescheduling of the match, a court ruling overrode Presidente Ibáñez's elimination from the tournament and the team was reinstated into the competition.

==== Quarter-finals ====
Team 1	Agg.	Team 2	1st leg	2nd leg
Rangers	1–5	Ñublense	1–1	0–4
Deportes Linares	1–0	Universidad de Concepción	1–0	0–0
Imperial Unido	1–2	Huachipato	1–2	0–0
Deportes Puerto Montt	3–2	Deportes Temuco	2–0	1–2

===== First leg =====
22 June 2024	Deportes Puerto Montt	2–0	Deportes Temuco	Puerto Montt
16:00 UTC−4	Pérez 42'; Vargas 48'	Report		Stadium: Regional de Chinquihue; Attendance: 3,572; Referee: Felipe González

26 June 2024	Rangers	1–1	Ñublense	Talca
19:00 UTC−4	Gotti 23'	Report	Plaza 51'	Stadium: Fiscal; Referee: Nicolás Millas

30 June 2024	Deportes Linares	1–0	Universidad de Concepción	Linares
15:00 UTC−4	Vallejos 1'	Report		Stadium: Fiscal Tucapel Bustamante; Attendance: 1,657; Referee: Brenda Cisternas

4 September 2024	Imperial Unido	1–2	Huachipato	Nueva Imperial
15:30 UTC−4	Parra 84'	Report	Conelli 45'; Vega 57'	Stadium: El Alto; Referee: Fabián Reyes

===== Second leg =====
29 June 2024	Deportes Temuco	2–1 (2–3 agg.)	Deportes Puerto Montt	Temuco
16:00 UTC−4	Cortés 45+3'; Melivilú 90+7'	Report	Troncoso 16'	Stadium: Municipal Germán Becker; Referee: Víctor Abarzúa

30 June 2024	Ñublense	4–0 (5–1 agg.)	Rangers	Chillán
15:00 UTC−4	Sosa 6', 22'; Sánchez 45'; Oyarzo 51' (pen.)	Report		Stadium: Municipal Nelson Oyarzún Arenas; Attendance: 4,000; Referee: Miguel Araos

3 July 2024	Universidad de Concepción	0–0 (0–1 agg.)	Deportes Linares	Concepción
19:00 UTC−4		Report		Stadium: Ester Roa; Attendance: 535; Referee: Cristian Droguett

8 September 2024	Huachipato	0–0 (2–1 agg.)	Imperial Unido	Talcahuano
14:30 UTC−3		Report		Stadium: Huachipato-CAP Acero; Referee: Manuel Vergara

==== Semi-finals ====
Team 1	Agg.	Team 2	1st leg	2nd leg
Deportes Linares	3–6	Ñublense	2–1	1–5
Deportes Puerto Montt	5–2	Huachipato	5–1	0–1

===== First leg =====
8 July 2024	Deportes Linares	2–1	Ñublense	Linares
19:00 UTC−4	Peñaloza 51', 55'	Report	Plaza 6'	Stadium: Fiscal Tucapel Bustamante; Referee: Nicolás Millas

9 October 2024	Deportes Puerto Montt	5–1	Huachipato	Puerto Montt
16:00 UTC−3	Pérez 16'; Vázquez 29', 45+1'; Yáñez 86'; Zedán 89'	Report	Brea 28'	Stadium: Regional de Chinquihue; Attendance: 1,788; Referee: Nicolás Millas

===== Second leg =====
11 July 2024	Ñublense	5–1 (6–3 agg.)	Deportes Linares	Chillán
19:00 UTC−4	Oyarzo 26'; Sánchez 36'; Sosa 55'; Yáñez 58'; Rivera 90+2'	Report	Pastene 85'	Stadium: Municipal Nelson Oyarzún Arenas; Referee: Víctor Abarzúa

16 October 2024	Huachipato	1–0 (2–5 agg.)	Deportes Puerto Montt	Talcahuano
18:00 UTC−3	J. Gutiérrez 19'	Report		Stadium: Huachipato-CAP Acero; Referee: Gastón Philippe

==== Finals ====
23 October 2024	Deportes Puerto Montt	1–1	Ñublense	Puerto Montt
19:00 UTC−3	Vázquez 90+5'	Report	Graciani 66'	Stadium: Regional de Chinquihue; Attendance: 3,958; Referee: Nicolás Millas

29 October 2024	Ñublense	1–1 (2–2 agg.) (4–2 p)	Deportes Puerto Montt	Chillán
18:00 UTC−3	Oyarzo 34'	Report	Caroca 66' (o.g.)	Stadium: Municipal Nelson Oyarzún Arenas; Referee: Mathías Riquelme
	Penalties
	Rubio (penalty scored); Rozas (penalty scored); Rivera (penalty scored); Bosso (penalty scored)		(penalty missed) Vázquez; (penalty scored) Díaz; (penalty scored) Troncoso; (penalty missed) Antiñirre

== National stage ==
The national stage was played by the four regional winners, which played two double-legged semi-finals. The winners faced each other in the single-match final to decide the champions.

=== Bracket ===
Semi-finals
15	Coquimbo Unido	0	0	0
2	Universidad de Chile	0	1	1
18	Ñublense	2	1	3
5	Magallanes	1	1	2

Final
2	Universidad de Chile	1
18	Ñublense	0

=== Semi-finals ===
Team 1	Agg.	Team 2	1st leg	2nd leg
Coquimbo Unido	0–1	Universidad de Chile	0–0	0–1
Ñublense	3–2	Magallanes	2–1	1–1

==== First leg ====
9 October 2024	Coquimbo Unido	0–0	Universidad de Chile	Coquimbo
18:00 UTC−3		Report		Stadium: Municipal Francisco Sánchez Rumoroso; Attendance: 3,304; Referee: Felipe González

13 November 2024	Ñublense	2–1	Magallanes	Chillán
20:30 UTC−3	Sosa 2'; Bonacci 90'	Report	Jorquera 19'	Stadium: Municipal Nelson Oyarzún Arenas; Attendance: 6,000; Referee: Benjamín Saravia

==== Second leg ====
13 October 2024	Universidad de Chile	1–0 (1–0 agg.)	Coquimbo Unido	Ñuñoa, Santiago
20:00 UTC−3	Pons 89'	Report		Stadium: Nacional Julio Martínez Prádanos; Attendance: 35,143; Referee: Mathías Riquelme

17 November 2024	Magallanes	1–1 (2–3 agg.)	Ñublense	San Bernardo, Santiago
17:30 UTC−3	Larrivey 26' (pen.)	Report	Rubio 47'	Stadium: Municipal Luis Navarro Avilés; Attendance: 2,030; Referee: Rodrigo Carvajal

=== Final ===
20 November 2024
19:00 UTC−3

Universidad de Chile	1–0	Ñublense
Aránguiz 37'	Report

Estadio Nacional Julio Martínez Prádanos, Ñuñoa, Santiago
Attendance: 45,000
Referee: José Cabero

== Top scorers ==
Rank	Player	Club	Goals
1	(Uruguay) Diego Coelho	Cobresal	6
1	(Argentina) Julián Brea	Huachipato	6
3	(Argentina) Andrés Chávez	Coquimbo Unido	4
3	(Chile) Gonzalo Tapia	Barnechea	4
3	(Argentina) Enzo Díaz	Deportes Antofagasta	4
3	(Uruguay) Federico Martínez	Everton	4
3	(Argentina) Ismael Sosa	Ñublense	4
3	(Argentina) Gustavo Gotti	Rangers	4

Source: Campeonato Chileno

== See also ==
- 2024 Chilean Primera División
- 2024 Primera B de Chile
- 2024 Supercopa de Chile
