= Esteban Valencia =

Esteban Valencia may refer to:

- Esteban Valencia (footballer, born 1972)
- Esteban Valencia (footballer, born 1999)
