= Chabuco =

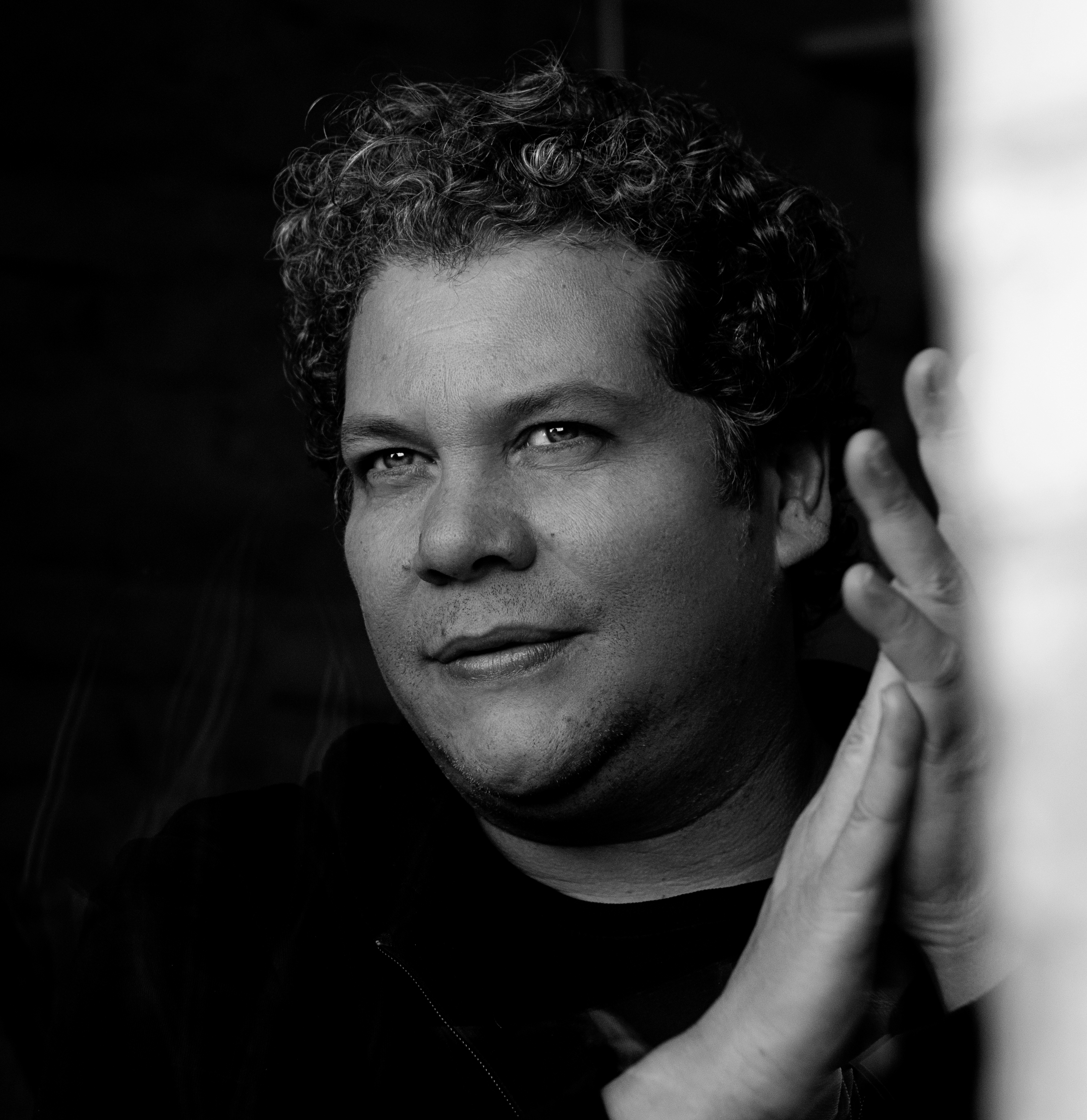

Background information
- Born: José Darío Martínez Acosta; June 1, 1975 (age 51); Valledupar, Colombia
- Genres: Vallenato, Latin pop, Latin folk, Bossa nova, Tango, Flamenco, Jazz, Bolero
- Occupations: Singer, songwriter, musician
- Instruments: Vocals, guitar
- Years active: 1998–present
- Label: Rose Talent

José Darío Martínez Acosta (born June 1, 1975), known professionally as Chabuco, is a Colombian singer, songwriter and musician from Valledupar. Throughout his career, Chabuco has blended traditional vallenato music with genres such as bossa nova, samba, flamenco, jazz, bolero, tango and rock, earning recognition as one of the most versatile voices in Colombian folk music.

He has been nominated three times for the Latin Grammy Awards and has performed at venues and festivals across Colombia, Mexico, Spain, the United States and Argentina.

== Early life ==
Martínez was born in Valledupar, the capital of the Cesar department in northeastern Colombia. He inherited his passion for music from his father, guitarist Hugues Martínez, who was a member of notable vallenato ensembles including Los Hermanos Zuleta and Bovea y sus Vallenatos.

His early musical influences included classic vallenato composers such as Rafael Escalona, Fredy Molina, Gustavo Gutiérrez Cabello and Leandro Díaz. His father was also an admirer of Peruvian singer Chabuca Granda, from whom José Darío's nickname "Chabuco" was derived.

== Career ==
=== Los Pelaos and early work ===
Chabuco began his musical career in the late 1990s as the vocalist of Los Pelaos, a youth vallenato group that achieved local recognition in the Cesar region. After leaving the group, he briefly formed a duo with accordion player Nicolás de los Ríos before pursuing a solo career.

=== Solo career ===
In the mid-2000s, Chabuco released his debut solo album Morirme de amor, followed by Nació mi poesía in 2008. His third album, Clásicos Café La Bolsa (2011), marked a turning point in his career. Named after a historic gathering place for vallenato musicians in Valledupar, the album incorporated flamenco, bolero and Latin jazz elements into traditional vallenato compositions. The album earned Chabuco a nomination for Album of the Year at the Premios Nuestra Tierra in 2012.

He has performed at prominent venues including the Palacio de Bellas Artes in Mexico City, the Sala Berlanga in Madrid, and the House of Blues in Stockholm, as well as festivals such as the Latin Billboard Showcase in Colombia.

In 2013, Chabuco released De ida y vuelta, continuing his exploration of cross-genre fusion.

=== Encuentro (2018) ===
In 2017, Chabuco traveled to São Paulo to begin recording his fifth studio album, Encuentro, produced by Brazilian musician Swami Jr. The album features vallenato compositions infused with bossa nova influences and incorporates instruments such as piano and harp. Notable collaborators include Spanish singer Alejandro Sanz, Dominican artist Vicente García and Brazilian pianist Zé Godoy.

=== Live albums (2020–2023) ===
Between 2020 and 2023, Chabuco released three live recordings: Chabuco desde el Teatro Colón (2020), recorded at the historic Teatro Colón in Bogotá; Chabuco en La Habana (2021), captured in Havana, Cuba; and Chabuco a Tres Pianos (2023).

=== Chabuco Tango (2024) ===
Following a tour of more than eighteen concerts across Spain, Chabuco released Chabuco Tango in 2024, a studio album fusing vallenato with Argentine tango. The album was recorded in Mina Clavero, Córdoba, Argentina, and was produced by Pablo Governatori and mastered by Daniel Ovie.

=== Chabuco Tango En Vivo (2025) ===
In 2025, Chabuco released Chabuco Tango En Vivo, a live album recorded at the Torquato Tasso, a prominent tango venue in Buenos Aires, as part of the Chabuco World Music Tour. The album features eight tracks exploring the fusion of vallenato, tango and Argentine rock, with the bandoneón as a central instrument. The recording includes a collaboration with Argentine guitarist Luis Salinas on a tango reinterpretation of the bolero standard "Contigo aprendí". The album was released on May 30, 2025.

== El Podcast de Chabuco ==
In parallel with his recording career, Chabuco hosts El Podcast de Chabuco, a conversational program focused on music, artistic creation and the personal trajectories of musicians and composers. The format combines informal interviews with live musical performances.

=== Season 1: Spain ===
The first season was recorded in Spain and features interviews with musicians including Gerónimo Rauch, Negri Heredia, Muerdo, Zenet and Antonio Carmona. Episodes address topics such as the creative process, artistic identity and the workings of the music industry.

=== Season 2: Colombia ===
The second season was recorded in Colombia and features conversations with Colombian and Latin American musicians including Gusi, Juan Pablo Vega, Santiago Cruz, Guillermo Vives, José Gaviria and members of Monsieur Periné. Episodes began airing weekly in December 2025 on audio and video platforms.

=== Season 3: Miami ===
The third season focuses on the experience of Latin American musicians based in the United States. Guests include Pollo Brito, Fernando Osorio, Luis Enrique, Jorge Luis Piloto, Yasmil Marrufo and Gian Marco. Topics covered include songwriting, migration as a creative factor and the impact of digital platforms on contemporary music production.

=== Season 4: Argentina ===
The fourth season explores connections between vallenato, bolero, tango and Argentine rock. Guests include Pablo Governatori, Cristian Larrosa, Ariel Ardit, Luis Salinas, Tweety González and Dante Spinetta. Episodes were released weekly on Thursdays across digital platforms.

== Discography ==
=== Studio albums ===
Year	Title
2004	Morirme de amor
2008	Nació mi poesía
2011	Clásicos Café La Bolsa
2013	De ida y vuelta
2018	Encuentro
2024	Chabuco Tango

=== Live albums ===
Year	Title
2020	Chabuco desde el Teatro Colón
2021	Chabuco en La Habana
2023	Chabuco a Tres Pianos
2025	Chabuco Tango En Vivo

== Awards and nominations ==
Year	Award	Category	Work	Result
2012	Premios Nuestra Tierra	Album of the Year	Clásicos Café La Bolsa	Nominated
—	Latin Grammy Awards	—	—	Nominated
—	Latin Grammy Awards	—	—	Nominated
—	Latin Grammy Awards	—	—	Nominated
