= Leandro Moreira =

Argentine footballer

Personal information
- Full name: Leandro Raúl Moreira
- Date of birth: 14 January 2002 (age 24)
- Place of birth: Longchamps, Argentina
- Height: 1.83 m (6 ft 0 in)
- Position: Striker

Team information
- Current team: Argentino de Merlo

Youth career
- Arzeno (five-a-side)
- Brown de Adrogué
- 2012–2017: Boca Juniors
- 2017–2022: Lanús

Senior career*
Years	Team	Apps	(Gls)
2022–2023	Lanús	0	(0)
2023–2024	Arsenal de Sarandí	10	(1)
2024	→ AEL (loan)	1	(0)
2024	→ Alvarado (loan)	3	(0)
2025	San Martín Burzaco	2	(0)
2025	Provincial Ovalle	7	(0)
2026–	Argentino de Merlo	5	(1)

International career
2017	Argentina U15		
- * Club domestic league appearances and goals as of 20 March 2026

Leandro Raúl Moreira (born 14 January 2002) is an Argentine footballer who plays as a striker for Argentino de Merlo.

== Club career ==
Born in Longchamps, Argentina, Moreira began playing baby fútbol for Club Social y Deportivo Arzeno. As a youth player, he was with Brown de Adrogué, Boca Juniors and Lanús. In June 2022, he signed his first professional contract with Lanús and switched to Arsenal de Sarandí in August 2023 on a deal until December 2024.

During 2024, Moreira played on loan from Lanús for Greek club AEL and Alvarado. As a player of Alvarado, he suffered a meniscus tear.

In 2025, Moreira joined San Martín de Burzaco. In the second half of the year, he moved to Chile and joined Provincial Ovalle.

Back to Argentina, Moreira joined Argentino de Merlo in January 2026.

== International career ==
Moreira represented the Argentina national under-15 team in the 2017 South American Championship.
