= Lucas Souto =

Argentine footballer

Personal information
- Full name: Lucas Alessandro Souto
- Date of birth: 11 October 1998 (age 28)
- Place of birth: Buenos Aires, Argentina
- Height: 1.80 m (5 ft 11 in)
- Position: Right-back

Team information
- Current team: Defensa y Justicia
- Number: 33

Youth career
- Ferro Carril Oeste

Senior career*
Years	Team	Apps	(Gls)
2020–2022	Ferro Carril Oeste	25	(0)
2022–	Defensa y Justicia	32	(1)
2023	→ Arsenal Sarandí (loan)	22	(0)
2023–2024	→ Huracán (loan)	33	(0)
- * Club domestic league appearances and goals as of 17:54, 10 May 2026 (UTC)

Lucas Alessandro Souto (born 11 October 1998) is an Argentine professional footballer who plays as a right-back for Defensa y Justicia.

== Career ==
Souto came through the youth setup at Ferro Carril Oeste. On 25 April 2019, he won the youth team's reserve tournament after defeating Arsenal Sarandí 4–1 on penalties. In May, he signed his first professional contract with the club, lasting until June 2022. On 30 November 2020, he made his first team debut in a 1–0 loss against Temperley in the Primera Nacional.

He left after his contract expired in June 2022 and joined Liga Profesional side Defensa y Justicia. He made his debut on 12 July in a 3–2 win against Aldosivi. On 25 January, he joined Arsenal Sarandí on loan until the end of the year. In June, however, his loan at Arsenal was terminated and he then again embarked on loan, joining Huracán until the end of 2024, with an option to buy for $800,000. He scored his first career goal in a 5–3 win against Racing Club on 10 September 2023. On 8 February 2024, he was sent off after 3 minutes in a match against Independiente.

== Career statistics ==
As of 18 February 2026

Appearances and goals by club, season and competition
Club	Season	League			Cup (Note: Includes Copa Argentina)		Continental		Other		Total	
Club	Season	Division	Goals	Apps	Apps	Goals	Apps	Goals	Apps	Goals	Apps	Goals
Ferro Carril Oeste	2020	Primera Nacional	4	0	—		—		—		4	0
Ferro Carril Oeste	2021	Primera Nacional	21	0	—		—		—		21	0
Ferro Carril Oeste	Total		25	0	0	0	0	0	0	0	25	0
Defensa y Justicia	2022	Liga Profesional	14	0	—		—		—		14	0
Defensa y Justicia	2025	Liga Profesional	3	0	—		—		—		3	0
Defensa y Justicia	2026	Liga Profesional	5	0	—		—		—		5	0
Defensa y Justicia	Total		22	0	0	0	0	0	0	0	22	0
Arsenal Sarandí (loan)	2023	Liga Profesional	22	0	1	0	—		—		23	0
Huracán (loan)	2023	Liga Profesional	12	0	2	1	—		—		14	1
Huracán (loan)	2024	Liga Profesional	21	0	4	0	—		—		25	0
Huracán (loan)	Total		33	0	6	1	0	0	0	0	39	1
Career total			102	0	6	1	0	0	0	0	108	1
