= Cristian Larrosa =

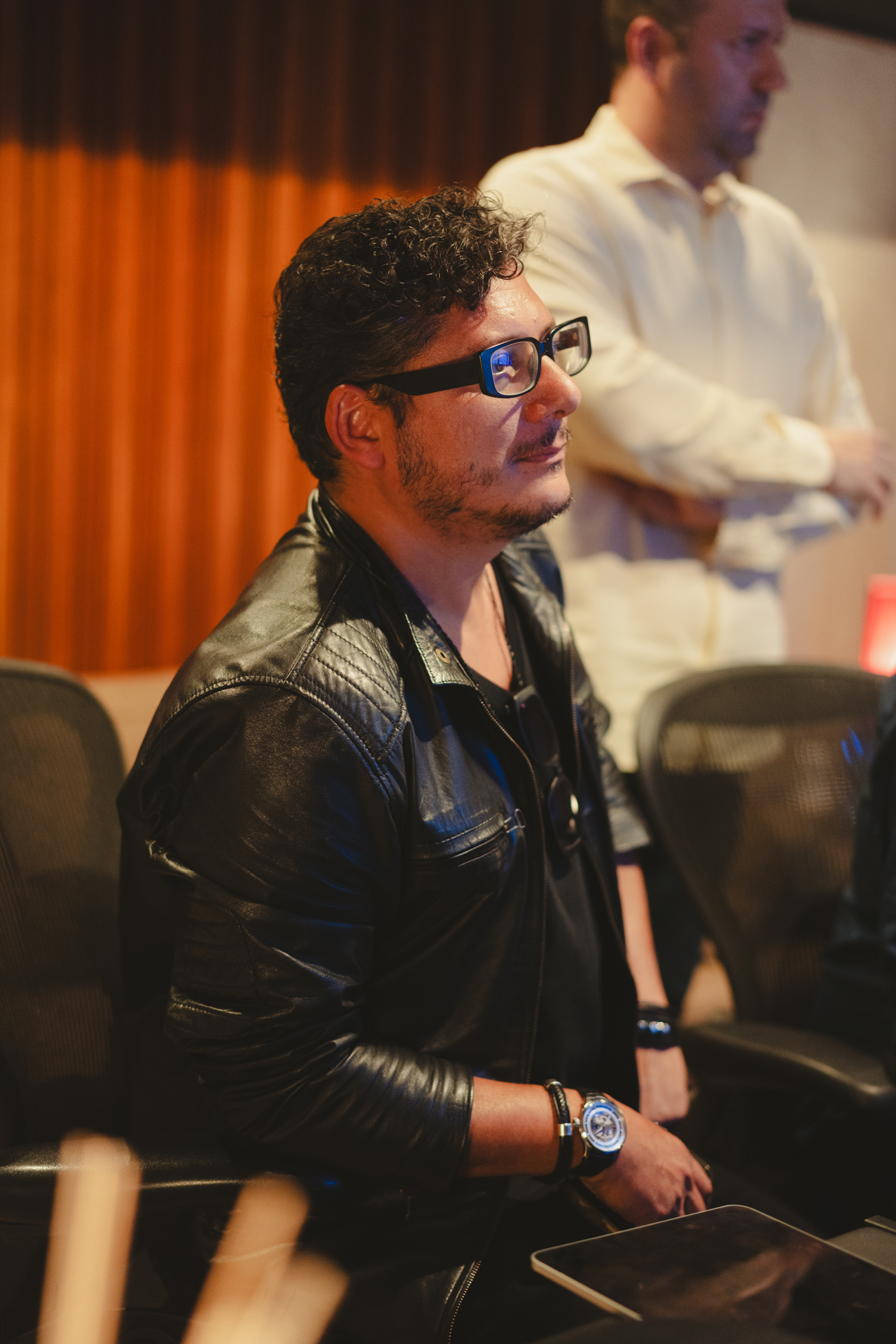
- Born: March 8, 1981 (age 45); Buenos Aires, Argentina
- Occupations: Singer, songwriter, record producer, music executive, entrepreneur
- Years active: 2000–present
- Website: cristianlarrosa.com

Cristian Larrosa (born March 8, 1981, in Buenos Aires, Argentina) is an Argentine singer, songwriter, record producer, music executive, and entrepreneur based in Madrid, Spain. He is the founder and CEO of Larrosa, a music finance and technology company specializing in music catalog investments, royalty administration, blockchain, artificial intelligence, and fintech solutions for the music industry.

His company has managed over $50 million in music rights transactions and approximately $25 million in assets under management, with operations spanning Europe, the United States, Latin America, and the Middle East.

== Early life and music career ==
Larrosa was born in Buenos Aires and developed an early interest in music, influenced by 1990s pop/rock, Latin music, and power ballads. He began his career as a singer-songwriter in Argentina in the early 2000s, establishing his first music companies in South America.

His discography includes the studio albums Estilo Romance (2007), Me Sobras, Me Faltas (2008), El Inconsciente de mi alma (2009), Nostalgic Lounge (2012), Live in Buenos Aires (2013), El Inconsciente de mi alma+ (2014), El Baladista (2020), 90/00 2.0 (2020), and M.A.P.A.: Los Mejores Amantes, Los Peores Amigos (2021).

His album M.A.P.A. involved a production team of over 30 professionals, including collaborators with a combined total of 17 Latin Grammy Awards and 4 Grammy Awards. The single "Un Minuto Más" from the album was nominated for the Hollywood Music in Media Awards.

Larrosa has performed at venues including Sala Siranush (Buenos Aires), Costello Club (Madrid), Bar&Co Temple (London), The Star (Oslo), and the Noise Off Festival (Madrid).

== Business career ==
=== Early ventures ===
In 2012, Larrosa began holding executive positions at music industry companies in London and Madrid. In 2015, he founded Viel Music, his first European company, which was subsequently acquired by American investors in 2019.

=== Larrosa ===
During the COVID-19 pandemic, Larrosa founded his eponymous company, initially focused on music consulting, education, and the adoption of new technologies such as blockchain and Web3. The company evolved into a music finance and technology firm specializing in catalog investments, royalty administration, and the development of financial models for the music industry.

In 2023, the company raised $16 million from American and Spanish investment funds to expand its catalog acquisition operations and deploy advances to artists.

The company operates through an Estonian e-Residency structure, which Larrosa adopted in 2019 to facilitate international operations with a team spanning nine nationalities. In 2023, he was named a spokesperson for the Estonian e-Residency Programme.

=== International expansion ===
In 2025, Larrosa relocated its headquarters to Dubai, conceived as a strategic hub for relationships with international funds and the development of alliances in cultural and technological investment. The company maintains operational presence in Europe, the Americas, and the MENA region.

The company also established an LLC in the United States to secure licensing for its Lyra Bank neobank division.

=== MusicTraders ===
MusicTraders is Larrosa's marketplace platform for music catalog investment opportunities and rights management infrastructure. Originally built as an internal tool for the company's own catalog acquisitions, it was later opened to outside investors.

As of March 2026, MusicTraders had executed over $50 million in music rights transactions across more than six years of operations. The platform serves two functions: a curated dealroom where vetted investors can access music catalog investment opportunities, and a royalty administration layer offering real-time revenue tracking, territory-level breakdowns, automated distributions, and contract management across more than 200 territories.

In 2026, MusicTraders launched a dedicated Deals & Acquisitions division staffed with executives from TikTok, BMG, Spotify, YouTube, and PeerMusic. The team includes Rafael Aguilar Grabowski (formerly head of PeerMusic's Latin region) as Strategic Partnerships Advisor, José María Escriña (formerly at TikTok and Spotify) as Music Acquisitions Specialist, Steve Bunyan (formerly at BMG) heading Investor Relations, Marina Mánica (formerly at Spotify and YouTube) as COO, and María José Clutet handling legal affairs.

The platform also introduced Prestige, an invitation-only membership for institutional investors with a minimum $5 million annual investment commitment.

=== Technology products ===
Larrosa has developed several technology products for the music industry:

- Wolfie AI — An artificial intelligence system specialized in the music industry, used internally for deal pipeline management and externally by investors for portfolio analytics.
- ArtSigna — A platform for registering musical works on the Bitcoin blockchain.
- Lyra Bank — An AI-powered neobank for the music industry, currently in development.

=== Rose Talent ===
Rose Talent by Larrosa is the company's frontline artist development and record label division. Notable releases include:

- Chabuco Tango (2024) by Colombian singer-songwriter Chabuco, a fusion of vallenato and Argentine tango featuring Ariel Ardit and a collaboration with Juanes on Fito Páez's "Pétalo de sal".
- Chapter One (2024) by Argentine singer and actor Gerónimo Rauch, a collection of nine songs composed by Frank Wildhorn, produced by Latin Grammy winner José Domenech, featuring collaborations with Pasión Vega and Sofía Escobar.
- Terra by Daniel Minimalia, which won the Latin Grammy Award for Best Instrumental Album.

Larrosa serves as general manager of both Gerónimo Rauch and Chabuco through Rose Talent.

== Speaking and publications ==
Larrosa has been invited as a speaker at major music industry conferences and trade fairs, including Primavera Sound, Midem, the Latin Alternative Music Conference (LAMC), and South Summit.

He has served as a lecturer in music industry master's programs and has authored books on financing and technology in music, including El arte de financiar proyectos musicales and La Inteligencia Artificial en la Industria de la música.

Larrosa co-authored the report IA + Música en LATAM, described as the first collaborative regional research on artificial intelligence and music ecosystems in Latin America, produced in partnership with the FUTURX community.

== Awards and recognition ==
Year	Award	Category	Work	Result
2020	Latin Grammy Awards	Best Instrumental Album	Terra (Daniel Minimalia, Rose Talent)	Won
2021	Hollywood Music in Media Awards	Independent Song	"Un Minuto Más"	Nominated
2026	Fintech Week Dubai	Financial Company of Excellence Award — Excellence in Investor Relations (Early-Stage Startup)	Larrosa / MusicTraders	Won

Forbes Argentina described Larrosa as "the rockstar of finance" for his pioneering role in creating financial models applied to the music industry. La Nación described his approach as one of the most innovative proposals in the sector in Latin America.

== Discography ==
=== Studio albums ===
Year	Title
2007	Estilo Romance
2008	Me Sobras, Me Faltas
2009	El Inconsciente de mi alma
2012	Nostalgic Lounge
2014	El Inconsciente de mi alma+
2020	El Baladista
2020	90/00 2.0
2021	M.A.P.A.: Los Mejores Amantes, Los Peores Amigos

=== Live albums ===
Year	Title
2013	Live in Buenos Aires
