= Leandro Díaz =

Leandro Díaz may refer to:

- Leandro Díaz (composer) (1928–2013), Colombian vallenato music composer
- Leandro Díaz (footballer, born 1986), Argentine footballer
- Leandro Díaz (footballer, born 1990), Uruguayan footballer
- Leandro Díaz (footballer, born 1992), Argentine footballer
- Leandro Díaz (footballer, born 1999), Chilean footballer
- Leandro Díaz (TV series), a Colombian television series on the life of composer Leandro Díaz.
