= Arsenal de Sarandí =

Argentine professional football club

- Full name: Arsenal Fútbol Club
- Nicknames: Los del Viaducto (The Viaduct men); El Arse
- Founded: 11 January 1957; 69 years ago
- Ground: Estadio Julio H. Grondona, Sarandí, Avellaneda Partido
- Capacity: 18,500
- Chairman: Lara Grondona
- Manager: Fabián Lisa
- League: Primera B
- 2025: Primera Nacional Zone A, 17th of 18 (relegated)
- Website: arsenalfc.com.ar
Home colours	Away colours

Arsenal Fútbol Club (Spanish pronunciation: [aɾseˈnal ˈfuðβol ˈkluβ]), usually referred as Arsenal de Sarandí [aɾseˈnal de saɾanˈdi], or simply Arsenal, is an Argentine sports club from the Sarandí district of Avellaneda Partido, Greater Buenos Aires.The football team currently plays in Primera B Metropolitana, the third division of the Argentine football league system.

The squad plays its home games at the Estadio Julio H. Grondona, named after one of the founders, which has a capacity of 18,500. It opened in 1964 but was not used in the First Division until 2004. The club's colours are red and light blue, in honour of the traditional teams of Avellaneda (Independiente and Racing). Arsenal won its first Primera División championship in 2012. Until then, club's major title had been the Copa Sudamericana win in 2007.

Apart from football, the club hosts other sports such as field hockey, futsal, and handball.

== History ==
=== The beginning ===
The club was founded in January 1957 by brothers Héctor and Julio Humberto Grondona, inspired by the English club Arsenal. Not only does it share its name with the eponymous Gunners of North London, the stories of the naming of the two clubs are very similar – both had military arsenals nearby. The team's shirt colour is light blue with a diagonal red band (similar to the shirt used by River Plate). The colours were chosen as a combination of the two older clubs in Avellaneda – Racing (light blue) and Independiente (red).

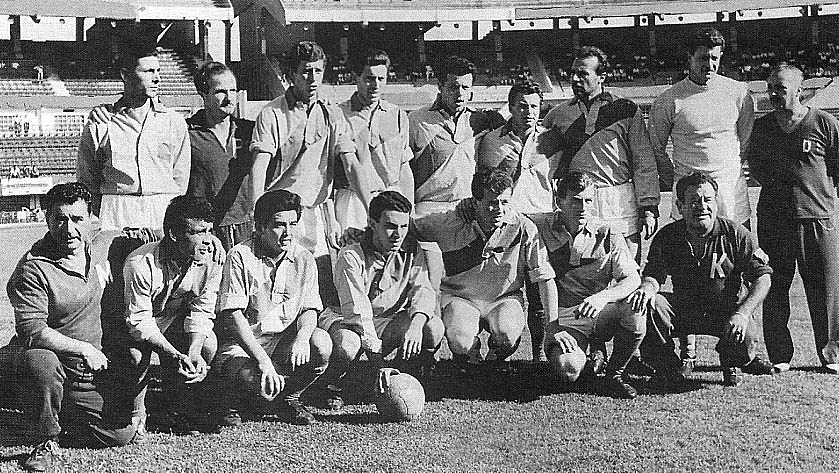
The 1962 Arsenal team, which won the first official title for the institution.

Julio Grondona went on to become president of Independiente, and then, in 1979, president of the Argentine Football Association, until 2014. He was also a vice-president of FIFA. Héctor Grondona, and then son Julio Ricardo, became presidents of Arsenal.

The club's best known former player is Jorge Burruchaga, who started his career at Arsenal in 1979, and had several stints as coach. Burru, as he is nicknamed, scored the winning goal for Argentina in the 1986 FIFA World Cup final against Germany.

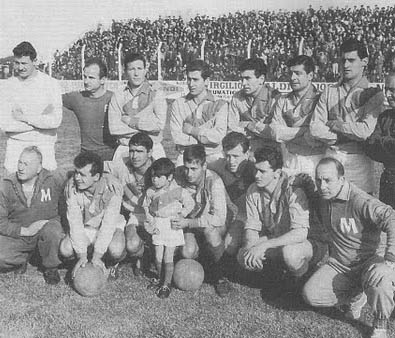
The team that won the Primera C championship in 1964

Arsenal's football team was promoted to successively higher divisions in 1962, 1986 and 1992, finally reaching the Primera División in 2002.

On 6 September 2006, Arsenal and Spanish club FC Barcelona (Barça) struck a deal whereby in exchange for the option to acquire young players that have not played more than one year in the Arsenal first team, Barça would help to improve Arsenal's infrastructure.

A member from Barça was to oversee the project, and visit the club on a monthly basis. This deal, however, fell through in 2007, reportedly because Arsenal could not afford the infrastructure to keep up with the plan.

=== International tournaments ===
The club's first appearance in an international tournament was in 2004, when, coached by Burruchaga, Arsenal reached the Quarter-finals of the Copa Sudamericana, eliminating Banfield and River Plate before losing to Bolivian club, Bolívar in its first ever official tie with a non-Argentine team.

Arsenal's results in the Apertura and Clausura of the 2006–07 season, qualified them for two major international tournaments, the secondary 2007 Copa Sudamericana and the top 2008 Copa Libertadores, the first time in their history that Arsenal qualified for South America's premier club tournament.

Arsenal's run through the 2007 Copa Sudamericana would lead Sports Illustrated to declare them "the underdog that couldn't be stopped". They beat reigning Argentine champions San Lorenzo in the qualifying round to earn a place in the Round of 16 where it faced Brazilian team Goiás. Arsenal won 3–2 in Brazil and recorded a 1–1 draw in the second leg to win the tie 4–3 on aggregate, achieving its first official victory over foreign opposition. Arsenal then met Mexican side Guadalajara in the quarter-finals, with a 0–0 draw at home, and a 3–1 victory at Estadio Jalisco. Advancing to the semi-finals, Arsenal met the other Argentine team still in the running, River Plate. Both games against River ended 0–0, Arsenal progressing to the final after winning the penalty shootout 4–2, with a number of saves from Mario Cuenca, Arsenal's goalkeeper.

In the first leg of the 2007 Copa Sudamericana final, Arsenal beat Club América of Mexico 3–2 at Estadio Azteca. Their upcoming home field advantage was mitigated by the fact that the second match could not be held in the Estadio Julio H. Grondona, because its capacity of 16,300 did not meet the CONMEBOL criteria of 40,000 for major finals. The game was finally held at the Estadio Juan Domingo Perón in Avellaneda. Arsenal entered the match without captain Carlos Castiglione, who was suspended due to a red card in the first leg. With these mitigating factors, Arsenal needed to avoid letting Club América win by a two-goal margin. The match started badly for the Argentine team when Christian Díaz scored an own goal inside the first 20 minutes. José Luis Calderón then hit the woodwork twice for Arsenal. In the 2nd half Arsenal conceded a second goal, but with only 7 minutes remaining Martín Andrizzi scored, giving Arsenal their first major title on the away goals rule.

Arsenal was not as successful in the 2008 Copa Libertadores, which started the month after their 2007 Copa Sudamericana. However, on 30 July 2008, Arsenal won its second international cup, the Suruga Bank Championship, which they qualified for as Copa Sudamericana champion. The rival was J.League Cup champions Gamba Osaka from Japan. After a hard match, captain Carlos Casteglione scored the only goal with a precise header on the 86th minute of play.

=== First domestic titles ===
Arsenal won its first championship on 24 June 2012 after defeating Belgrano de Córdoba 1–0 with a goal scored by Lisandro López. The squad totalized 38 points over 19 games played, with 11 matches won and only 3 defeats. Arsenal also became the first team to win a Primera División title after playing in the five divisions that Argentine football league system is made of. As champions, Arsenal classified for the Supercopa Argentina, a one-match tournament between the Primera División and the Copa Argentina winners. On 7 November 2012 Arsenal defeated Copa Argentina champions Boca Juniors 4–3 by penalties after a 0–0 draw.

Arsenal won the Copa Argentina on 16 October 2013 by defeating San Lorenzo de Almagro 3–0 in a final match played at the Catamarca Province

== Stadium ==
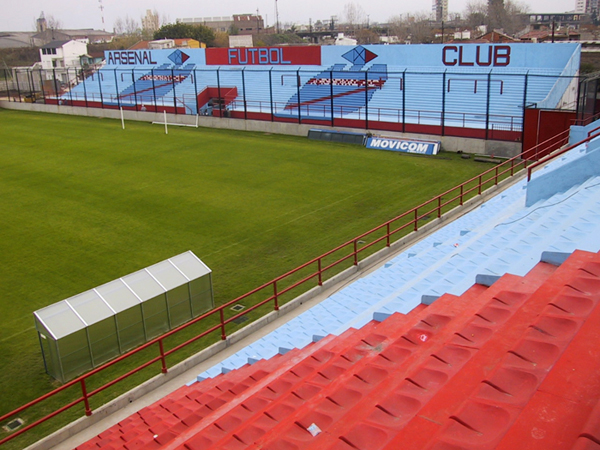
Estadio Julio Grondona, Arsenal's venue

The Estadio Julio Grondona in Sarandí has a capacity of 36,300, and is known as el Viaducto (The Viaduct). It is located at 3660 Juan Díaz De Solís in Sarandí.

Arsenal's first stadium was started to be built on 11 October 1962, officially opening on 22 August 1964. When Arsenal won promotion to the Primera, its basic concrete stadium was deemed unfit for the league and the team played at the grounds of Lanús and Racing for two seasons until work on the stadium was complete. The remodeled stadium (named "Julio Humberto Grondona") was opened on 7 August 2004 with a party for the fans. The first game was against Banfield in the Copa Sudamericana. The new stadium has witnessed defeats of the biggest teams in Argentine football such as Boca Juniors and River Plate.

== Players ==
=== Current squad ===
As of August 2023.

Note: Flags indicate national team as defined under FIFA eligibility rules; some limited exceptions apply. Players may hold more than one non-FIFA nationality.

No.	Pos.	Nation	Player
2	DF	ARG	Ignacio Gariglio (on loan from Estudiantes)
3	DF	ARG	Leonardo Marchi
4	DF	ARG	Lucas Souto (on loan from Defensa y Justicia)
6	MF	ARG	Tiago Banega (on loan from Racing)
7	FW	ARG	Facundo Pons
8	MF	ARG	Braian Rivero (on loan from Defensa y Justicia)
9	FW	COL	Flabián Londoño (on loan from River Plate)
10	MF	ARG	Santiago Toloza (on loan from Talleres)
11	FW	ARG	Lucas Brochero (on loan from Boca Juniors)
13	DF	ARG	Joaquín Pombo
14	MF	ARG	Mauro Burruchaga
15	MF	ARG	Franco Vega (on loan from Vélez Sarsfield)
16	MF	ARG	Tomás Sives (on loan from Defensa y Justicia)
17	GK	ARG	Francisco Rivadeneira
18	MF	ARG	Gonzalo Muschia

No.	Pos.	Nation	Player
19	DF	ARG	Maximiliano Centurión
21	FW	ARG	Juan Ignacio Peinipil
22	FW	ARG	Lautaro Guzmán (on loan from Talleres)
23	GK	ARG	Alejandro Medina
24	FW	ARG	Daniel Lucero
25	DF	ARG	Néstor Breitenbruch (on loan from Godoy Cruz)
26	DF	ARG	Franco Martínez
27	MF	ARG	Bautista Cejas
28	FW	ARG	Leandro Moreira
29	FW	ARG	Brandon Sosa
30	DF	ARG	Facundo Cardozo
31	DF	ARG	Iván Cabrera
33	FW	ARG	Juan Cavallaro
34	MF	ARG	Facundo Brestt
36	MF	PAR	Alfredo Amarilla (on loan from Tacuary)
37	DF	ARG	Agustín Álvarez

==== Out on loan ====
Note: Flags indicate national team as defined under FIFA eligibility rules; some limited exceptions apply. Players may hold more than one non-FIFA nationality.

No.	Pos.	Nation	Player
—	GK	ARG	Alejandro Rivero (at Dock Sud until 31 December 2022)
—	DF	ARG	Fernando Torrent (at Huracán until 31 December 2023)

No.	Pos.	Nation	Player
—	MF	ARG	Ramiro Balbuena (at Estudiantes RC until 31 December 2022)

== Former coaches ==
- (Argentina) Oscar López
- (Argentina) Juan Emilio Elena (1961–72)
- (Argentina) Roberto Iturrieta (1973–74)
- (Argentina) Juan Emilio Elena (1974–82)
- (Argentina) Roberto Iturrieta (1983–84)
- (Argentina) Juan Emilio Elena (1985–89)
- (Argentina) Roberto Iturrieta (1989–94)
- (Argentina) Roberto Ferreiro (1994–95)
- (Argentina) Humberto Grondona (1995)
- (Argentina) Roberto Iturrieta (1995–97)
- (Argentina) Roberto Ferreiro (1997–98)
- (Argentina) José María Bianco (1998–01)
- (Argentina) Roberto Mariani (2001)
- (Argentina) Jorge Burruchaga (1 Jan 2002 – 30 June 2005)
- (Argentina) José María Bianco (1 July 2005 – 22 March 2006)
- (Argentina) Luis de Luise (interim) (2006)
- (Argentina) Miguel Ángel López (2006)
- (Argentina) Gustavo Alfaro (1 Dec 2006 – 30 June 2008)
- (Argentina) Daniel Garnero (1 July 2008 – 26 April 2009)
- (Argentina) Jorge Burruchaga (1 May 2009 – 30 April 2010)
- (Argentina) Carlos Ruiz (interim) (1 May 2010 – 30 June 2010)
- (Argentina) Gustavo Alfaro (2010–2014)
- (Argentina) Martín Palermo (2014-2015)
- (Argentina) Ricardo Caruso Lombardi (2015)
- (Argentina) Sergio Rondina (2016)
- (Argentina) Lucas Bernardi (2016)
- (Argentina) Humberto Grondona (2017)
- (Argentina) Sergio Rondina (2018-2021)
- (Argentina) Israel Damonte (2021)
- (Argentina) Leonardo Madelón (2022)
- (Argentina) Carlos Ruiz (2023)
- (Argentina) Federico Vilar (2023)
- (Argentina) Tobías Kohan (2024)
- (Argentina) José María Bianco (2024)
- (Argentina) Martín Rolón (2025)
- (Argentina) Darío Franco (2025-)

== Honours ==
=== Senior titles ===
Keys

- Record
- ^{(s)} Shared record

Type	Competition	Titles	Winning years
National (League)	Primera División	1	2012 Clausura
National (Cups)	Copa Argentina	1	2012–13
National (Cups)	Supercopa Argentina	1	2012
International	Copa Sudamericana	1	2007
International	Suruga Bank Championship	1	2008

=== Other titles ===
Titles won in lower divisions:

- Primera B Nacional (1): 2018–19
- Primera División C (1): 1964
- Primera de Aficionados (1): 1962
