= Ramiro Balbuena =

Argentine professional footballer

Personal information
- Full name: Ramiro Agustín Balbuena Chamorro
- Date of birth: 28 February 2000 (age 26)
- Place of birth: Puerto Iguazú, Argentina
- Position: Right midfielder

Team information
- Current team: Nueva Chicago
- Number: 17

Youth career
- Arsenal de Sarandí

Senior career*
Years	Team	Apps	(Gls)
2020–2024	Arsenal de Sarandí	2	(0)
2021	→ Sol de Mayo (loan)	26	(8)
2022–2023	→ Estudiantes RC (loan)	31	(1)
2024–	Nueva Chicago	36	(1)
- * Club domestic league appearances and goals as of 17:13, 13 April 2026 (UTC)

Ramiro Agustín Balbuena Chamorro (born 28 February 2000) is an Argentine professional footballer who plays as a right midfielder for Nueva Chicago.

== Career ==
Balbuena is a product of the Arsenal de Sarandí academy. The left midfielder was initially promoted to Sergio Rondina's first-team midway through 2019, though suffered a serious leg injury in August. He returned to the first-team ahead of the 2020–21 campaign. After being an unused substitute for a Copa de la Liga Profesional home loss to Atlético Tucumán on 8 November, Balbuena's senior debut arrived a week later in a defeat to Racing Club; he replaced Nicolás Castro after sixty-seven minutes.

== Career statistics ==
As of 15 November 2020.

Appearances and goals by club, season and competition
Club	Season	League			Cup		League Cup		Continental		Other		Total	
Club	Season	Division	Apps	Goals	Apps	Goals	Apps	Goals	Apps	Goals	Apps	Goals	Apps	Goals
Arsenal de Sarandí	2020–21 (Note: Soccerway counts Copa de la Liga Profesional appearances as league appearances.)	Primera División	1	0	0	0	0	0	—		0	0	1	0
Career total			1	0	0	0	0	0	—		0	0	1	0
