= Diego Coelho =

Uruguayan footballer

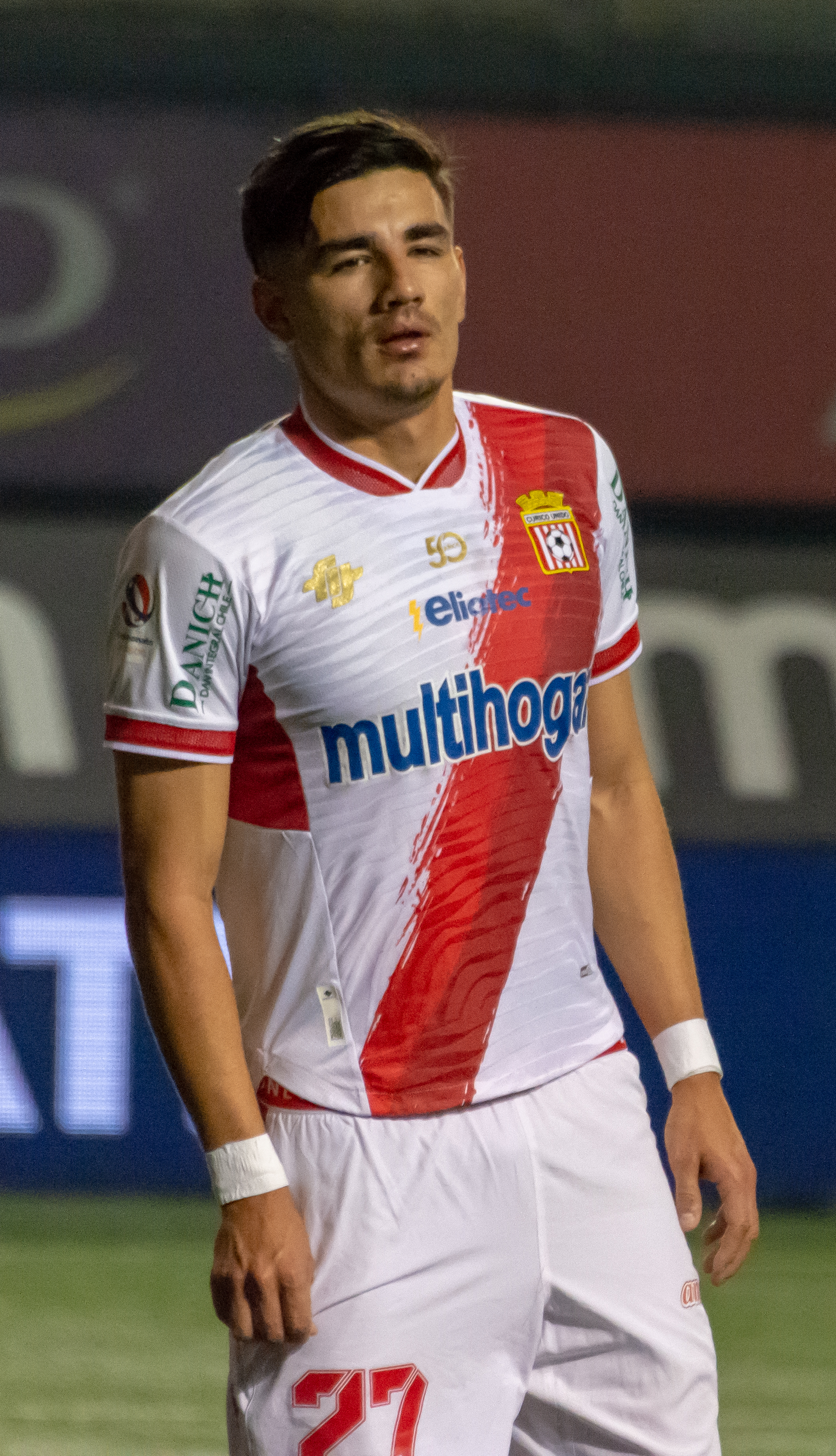
- Coelho with Curicó Unido in 2023

Personal information
- Full name: Diego Martín Coelho Díaz
- Date of birth: 28 January 1995 (age 31)
- Place of birth: Montevideo, Uruguay
- Height: 1.82 m (6 ft 0 in)
- Position: Striker

Team information
- Current team: Audax Italiano

Youth career
- 2009: Nacional
- 2010–2015: Fénix
- 2016: Nacional

Senior career*
Years	Team	Apps	(Gls)
2017–2019	Nacional	12	(2)
2018–2019	→ Boston River (loan)	36	(11)
2020–2021	Defensor Sporting	31	(5)
2021	Cerro	24	(11)
2022–2023	Curicó Unido	63	(19)
2024–2025	Cobresal	42	(17)
2026–	Audax Italiano	0	(0)
- * Club domestic league appearances and goals as of 14 December 2025

Diego Martín Coelho Díaz (born 28 January 1995) is an Uruguayan footballer who plays as a striker for Chilean club Audax Italiano.

== Club career ==
A product of both Nacional and Fénix, Coelho made his professional debut with the first in a 0–0 draw against River Plate from Montevideo on 29 March 2017.

After playing on loan for Boston River in 2018 and 2019, he signed with Defensor Sporting in 2020.

In 2021, he played for Cerro in the Uruguayan Segunda División and became the top goalscorer of the season with eleven goals.

In 2022, Coelho moved to Chile and signed with Curicó Unido in the top division. In 2024, he switched to Cobresal. He left them at the end of 2025.

On 26 December 2025, Coelho signed with Audax Italiano.

== Personal life ==
He is the son of the former Uruguay international footballer Fabián Coelho.

== Honours ==
Nacional

- Torneo Apertura (1): 2018
- Torneo Intermedio (2): 2017, 2018

Individual

- Uruguayan Segunda División Top goalscorer (1): 2021
