= Franco Vega =

Argentine footballer

Personal information
- Full name: Franco Agustín Vega
- Date of birth: 9 September 2001 (age 25)
- Place of birth: Cutral Co, Argentina
- Height: 1.79 m (5 ft 10 in)
- Position: Midfielder

Team information
- Current team: Deportivo Armenio

Youth career
- Petrolero Argentino
- ACDC Patagonia
- Boca Juniors
- Vélez Sarsfield

Senior career*
Years	Team	Apps	(Gls)
2021–2024	Vélez Sarsfield	0	(0)
2021–2022	→ Estoril (loan)	0	(0)
2023	→ Arsenal de Sarandí (loan)	13	(0)
2024	→ Huachipato (loan)	0	(0)
2025	Alvarado	1	(0)
2026–	Deportivo Armenio	0	(0)
- * Club domestic league appearances and goals as of 20 January 2026

Franco Agustín Vega (born 9 September 2001) is an Argentine footballer who plays as a midfielder for Deportivo Armenio.

== Career ==
Born in Cutral Co, Argentina, Vega was with the city team, Petrolero Argentino, ACDC Patagonia and Boca Juniors before joining the Vélez Sarsfield youth system. Having trained with the first team since 2020, he signed his first professional contract in 2021 with them. In August of the same year, he was loaned to Portuguese club Estoril on a deal for a year with an option to buy, making appearances for the under-23 team and winning the 2021–2022 Liga Revelação.

Despite Vega was promoted to the Estoril first team, he returned to Vélez Sarsfield and was subsequently loaned to Arsenal de Sarandí for the 2023 season. For the 2024 season, he joined on loan to Huachipato in the Chilean top division. At the end of the year, he ended his contract with Vélez Sarsfield.

In 2025, Vega returned to his country of birth and joined Alvarado. The next year, he joined Deportivo Armenio.

== Personal life ==
Vega is of Chilean descent since his paternal grandparents are Chilean, being eligible to represent both Argentina and Chile. He got the Chilean nationality in 2023.
