= Pedro Sánchez (footballer, born 1998) =

Chilean footballer (born 1998)

Personal information
- Full name: Pedro Iván Sánchez Torrealba
- Date of birth: 7 February 1998 (age 28)
- Place of birth: Viña del Mar, Chile
- Height: 1.81 m (5 ft 11 in)
- Position: Forward

Team information
- Current team: Deportes Recoleta

Youth career
- Everton

Senior career*
| Years | Team | Apps | (Gls) |
| 2016–2023 | Everton | 65 | (6) |
| 2017 | → Unión La Calera (loan) | 9 | (2) |
| 2020–2021 | → Unión La Calera (loan) | 38 | (2) |
| 2024–2025 | Ñublense | 46 | (6) |
| 2026– | Deportes Recoleta | 0 | (0) |
- * Club domestic league appearances and goals as of 8 January 2026

Pedro Iván Sánchez Torrealba (born 7 February 1998) is a Chilean footballer who plays as a forward for Deportes Recoleta.

== Career ==
A product of the Everton de Viña del Mar youth system, he ended his contract with them in December 2023.

In 2024, Sánchez signed with Ñublense. He left them at the end of 2025.

In January 2026, Sánchez joined Deportes Recoleta.
