= Iván Rozas =

Chilean footballer (born 1998)

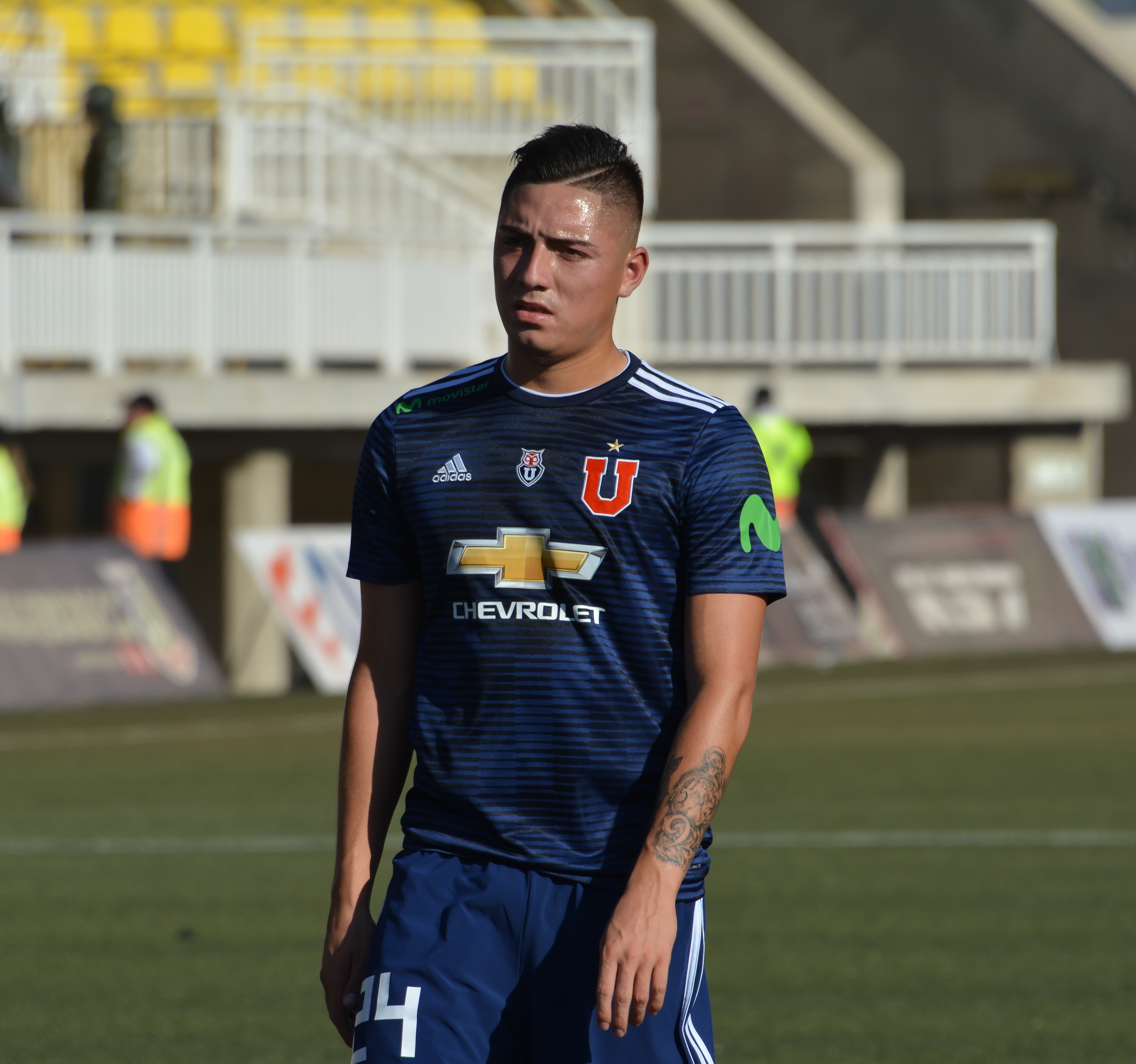
- Rozas with Universidad de Chile in 2018

Personal information
- Full name: Iván Marcelo Rozas Agüero
- Date of birth: July 1, 1998 (age 28)
- Place of birth: Temuco, Chile
- Height: 1.78 m (5 ft 10 in)
- Positions: Attacking midfielder; winger

Team information
- Current team: Rangers

Youth career
- Universidad de Chile

Senior career*
Years	Team	Apps	(Gls)
2017–2019	Universidad de Chile	13	(0)
2019	→ Ñublense (loan)	5	(2)
2020–2025	Ñublense	76	(4)
2021	→ O'Higgins (loan)	21	(0)
2023	→ Deportes Copiapó (loan)	29	(1)
2025	Deportes Copiapó	13	(0)
2026	Deportes Antofagasta	7	(0)
2026–	Rangers	0	(0)
- * Club domestic league appearances and goals as of 28 May 2026

Iván Marcelo Rozas Agüero (born 1 July 1998) is a Chilean professional footballer who plays as a midfielder for Rangers de Talca.

== Career ==
In 2021, Rozas joined O'Higgins.

In 2023, Rozas played for Deportes Copiapó. He rejoined them as a free agent on 15 July 2025.

In February 2026, Rozas joined Deportes Antofagasta. He left them on 27 May of the same year and switched to Rangers de Talca.

== Honours ==
Universidad de Chile

- Primera División: 2017–C

Ñublense

- Primera B: 2020
