= Franco Frías =

Argentine footballer

Personal information
- Full name: Franco Ezequiel Frías
- Date of birth: 17 March 2002 (age 24)
- Place of birth: Granadero Baigorria, Argentina
- Height: 1.74 m (5 ft 9 in)
- Position: Forward

Team information
- Current team: Cobresal (on loan from Rosario Central)

Youth career
- 2009–2020: Rosario Central

Senior career*
Years	Team	Apps	(Gls)
2020–	Rosario Central	22	(2)
2023	→ Barracas Central (loan)	8	(1)
2024	→ Unión Española (loan)	24	(9)
2025	→ Sarmiento Junín (loan)	20	(1)
2026–	→ Cobresal (loan)	0	(0)
- * Club domestic league appearances and goals as of 19:04, 29 January 2026 (UTC)

Franco Ezequiel Frías (born 17 March 2002) is an Argentine footballer who plays as a forward for Chilean club Cobresal on loan from Argentine Primera División club Rosario Central.

== Club career ==
Born in Granadero Baigorria, Argentina, Frías came to the Rosario Central youth system at the age of seven. He was called up to the first team as a substitute player in the Argentine Primera División match against Lanús on 9 January 2021, but he made his debut against Aldosivi on 16 April 2022.

In 2023, Frías was loaned out to Barracas Central for a year. The next season, he was loaned out to Chilean Primera División club Unión Española. In 2025, he was loaned out to Sarmiento de Junín. In February 2026, he returned to Chile and joined Cobresal on loan with an option to buy.

== International career ==
Frías took part of Argentina at under-17 level in 2018 and 2019.

== Personal life ==
Both his father, José, and his grandfather, Francisco, were with the Rosario Central youth ranks.

Frías is nicknamed Chipi.

== Career statistics ==
As of 24 October 2023.

Club statistics
Club	Division	League			Cup		Continental		Total	
Club	Division	Season	Apps	Goals	Apps	Goals	Apps	Goals	Apps	Goals
Rosario Central	Argentine Primera División	2022	22	2	0	0	—		22	2
Barracas Central	Argentine Primera División	2023	5	1	3	0	—		8	1
Unión Española	Chilean Primera División	2024	24	9	5	2	—		29	11
Career total			51	12	8	2	—		59	14
