= Estadio Municipal Antonio Ríspoli Díaz =

Stadium in Punta Arenas, Chile

Coordinates: 53°09′14.59″S 70°53′43.86″W

The Estadio Fiscal Antonio Rispoli Diaz is a stadium located in Punta Arenas, Chile. It has a capacity of 4,500. The football stadium in the southern part of Chile opened in 1976.
