= Julián Brea =

Argentine footballer

Personal information
- Full name: Julián Agustín Brea
- Date of birth: 10 October 1999 (age 27)
- Place of birth: Tres Algarrobos, Argentina
- Position: Forward

Team information
- Current team: Cobresal

Youth career
- 2002–2016: Atlético Charlone
- 2016–2018: Sarmiento de Junín

Senior career*
Years	Team	Apps	(Gls)
2018–2022	Sarmiento de Junín	43	(3)
2023–2025	Huachipato	63	(2)
2026–	Cobresal	0	(0)
- * Club domestic league appearances and goals as of 18 January 2026

Julián Agustín Brea (born 10 October 1999) is an Argentine professional footballer who plays as a forward for Chilean Primera División club Cobresal.

== Club career ==
Brea embarked on his senior career with Sarmiento, after signing with the club in 2016 following a fourteen-year stint with Atlético Charlone. He made the breakthrough during the 2017–18 season, initially as an unused substitute against Nueva Chicago in November 2017 prior to making his debut in a 1–0 win over Aldosivi on 24 March 2018. A second appearance against All Boys followed a week later, in a season which the team ended in fifth place.

In 2023, Brea moved to Chile and joined Huachipato. With them, he won the 2024 Chilean Primera División and was honored in his hometown, Coronel Charlone.

In January 2026, Brea switched to Cobresal.

== International career ==
In 2017, Brea trained with the Argentina U20s; including against the senior side.

== Career statistics ==
As of 27 March 2019.

Appearances and goals by club, season and competition
Club	Season	League			Cup		Continental		Other		Total	
Club	Season	Division	Apps	Goals	Apps	Goals	Apps	Goals	Apps	Goals	Apps	Goals
Sarmiento	2017–18	Primera B Nacional	2	0	0	0	—		0	0	2	0
Sarmiento	2018–19	Primera B Nacional	0	0	0	0	—		0	0	0	0
Career total			2	0	0	0	—		0	0	2	0

== Honours ==
Huachipato

- Chilean Primera División: 2023
- Copa Chile: 2025
