= Enzo Hoyos =

Argentine footballer

Personal information
- Full name: Enzo Santiago Ariel Hoyos
- Date of birth: 10 May 2000 (age 26)
- Place of birth: José C. Paz, Buenos Aires, Argentina
- Height: 1.79 m (5 ft 10 in)
- Position: Attacking midfielder

Team information
- Current team: Ferro Carril Oeste (on loan from Deportes Iquique)

Youth career
- Club Parque
- 2007–2009: Argentinos Juniors
- 2010: Barcelona San Justo
- 2011–2012: All Boys
- 2013–2021: Chacarita Juniors

Senior career*
Years	Team	Apps	(Gls)
2021–2024	Chacarita Juniors	65	(4)
2023	→ Beroe (loan)	10	(0)
2024	→ Deportes Iquique (loan)	27	(3)
2025–	Deportes Iquique	20	(2)
2026–	→ Ferro Carril Oeste (loan)	2	(0)
- * Club domestic league appearances and goals as of 17:40, 11 April 2026 (UTC)

Enzo Santiago Ariel Hoyos (born 10 May 2000) is an Argentine footballer who plays as an attacking midfielder for Ferro Carril Oeste on loan from Chilean club Deportes Iquique.

== Club career ==
Born in José C. Paz, Buenos Aires, Argentina, Hoyos began to play football for both a club from Frino neighbourhood and Club Social y Deportivo Parque at the age of six. Later, he was with Argentinos Juniors, Barcelona San Justo and All Boys before joining the Chacarita Juniors youth system. He made his professional debut with them in the 2021 Primera Nacional.

In the second half of 2023, he was loaned out to Beroe in the Bulgarian top division on a one-year deal with an option to buy. At the end of 2023, he ended his loan with them.

In 2024, he moved to Chile and signed on loan with Deportes Iquique in the Chilean Primera División.

In January 2026, Hoyos returned to Argentina and joined Ferro Carril Oeste on loan from Deportes Iquique.
