= Federico Martínez (footballer, born 1996) =

Uruguayan footballer

Personal information
- Full name: Federico Andrés Martínez Berroa
- Date of birth: 28 February 1996 (age 30)
- Place of birth: Montevideo, Uruguay
- Height: 1.75 m (5 ft 9 in)
- Position: Winger

Team information
- Current team: Atlético Goianiense

Youth career
- Las Flores
- Zorzal
- 2008–2015: Liverpool Montevideo

Senior career*
Years	Team	Apps	(Gls)
2015–2021	Liverpool Montevideo	158	(41)
2020	→ Rosario Central (loan)	2	(0)
2020–2021	→ Independiente (loan)	0	(0)
2022–2024	León	23	(2)
2023	→ Nacional (loan)	31	(6)
2024	→ Everton (loan)	22	(3)
2025–	Atlético Goianiense	38	(4)

International career
2019	Uruguay U22	5	(0)
2021	Uruguay	1	(0)
- * Club domestic league appearances and goals as of 17 December 2025

Federico Andrés Martínez Berroa (born 28 February 1996) is a Uruguayan professional footballer who plays for Atlético Goianiense. Mainly a winger, he can also play as a forward.

== Club career ==
Born in Montevideo, Martínez joined Liverpool Montevideo's youth setup at the age of 12, after playing for Zorzal Baby Fútbol Club and Club Las Flores Baby Fútbol. He made his first team – and Primera División – debut on 13 February 2016, starting in a 0–1 away loss against Plaza Colonia.

Martínez only established himself as a starter in the 2017 campaign, and scored his first senior goal on 26 August of that year, netting the opener in a 1–2 loss at Peñarol. On 26 November, he scored a brace in a 5–0 home routing of Danubio.

On 4 May 2019, Martínez scored a hat-trick in a 4–0 away win over Boston River. The following 30 January, he moved abroad and joined Argentine Primera División side Rosario Central on loan, after the club bought 30% of his economic rights for a rumoured fee of US$750,000.

In September 2020, after only two matches for Central, Martínez moved to Independiente on loan until the following 31 January, with a buyout option. After featuring rarely, he rescinded his contract with the Rojo on 19 February 2021 and returned to his parent club.

In 2024, Martínez moved to Chile and joined Primera División club Everton on a one-year loan from Mexican club León.

== International career ==
Martínez is a former Uruguay youth international. He was part of under-22 squad which finished fourth at 2019 Pan American Games.

On 29 August 2021, Martínez received maiden call-up to senior team for FIFA World Cup qualifiers.

== Career statistics ==
=== Club ===
As of 19 November 2021

Appearances and goals by club, season and competition
Club	Season	League			Cup		Continental		Other		Total	
Club	Season	Division	Apps	Goals	Apps	Goals	Apps	Goals	Apps	Goals	Apps	Goals
Liverpool Montevideo	2015–16	Primera División	16	0	—		—		—		16	0
Liverpool Montevideo	2016	Primera División	14	0	—		—		—		14	0
Liverpool Montevideo	2017	Primera División	35	3	—		2 (Note: Appearance(s) in Copa Sudamericana.)	0	—		37	3
Liverpool Montevideo	2018	Primera División	31	13	—		—		—		31	13
Liverpool Montevideo	2019	Primera División	34	11	—		4	0	1 (Note: Appearance in Torneo Intermedio final.)	0	39	11
Liverpool Montevideo	2021	Primera División	26	13	—		0	0	—		26	13
Liverpool Montevideo	Total		156	40	—		6	0	1	0	163	40
Rosario Central (loan)	2019–20	Primera División	2	0	0	0	—		—		2	0
Independiente (loan)	2020–21	Primera División	0	0	0	0	6	1	7 (Note: Appearance(s) in Copa de la Liga Profesional.)	0	13	1
Career total			158	40	0	0	12	1	8	0	178	41

=== International ===
As of 9 September 2021

Appearances and goals by national team and year
National team	Year	Apps	Goals
Uruguay	2021	1	0
Total		1	0
