= Luciano Vázquez =

Argentine footballer

Personal information
- Full name: Claudio Luciano Vázquez
- Date of birth: 6 March 1985 (age 41)
- Place of birth: Buenos Aires, Argentina
- Height: 1.81 m (5 ft 11 in)
- Position: Striker

Youth career
- Huracán
- Independiente

Senior career*
Years	Team	Apps	(Gls)
2005–2006	Atlético Tembetary	–	(–)
2006–2007	La Plata	18	(2)
2007–2008	Huracán TA	30	(8)
2008–2009	Rivadavia	30	(10)
2010	Alumni Villa María	17	(4)
2010	Central Córdoba SdE	6	(1)
2011	Villa Mitre	16	(6)
2011	Cipolletti	12	(1)
2012	Racing de Olavarría	17	(7)
2012–2013	Flandria	32	(13)
2012–2014	Ñublense	30	(20)
2014–2015	Al-Shahania	18	(7)
2015–2016	Huachipato	25	(9)
2016–2017	Temperley	23	(1)
2017–2019	Al-Shahania	19	(8)
2019–2020	Dibba Al-Fujairah	–	(–)
2020	Al-Markhiya	11	(7)
2020–2021	Al-Faisaly	–	(–)
2021	Villa Dálmine	6	(0)
2021–2022	Ciudad de Bolívar	15	(5)
2022	Al-Shahania	8	(5)
2022–2024	Ciudad de Bolívar	52	(12)
2024–2026	Deportes Puerto Montt	43	(21)
Total		428	(147)
- * Club domestic league appearances and goals

Claudio Luciano Vázquez (born 6 March 1985), known as Luciano Vázquez, is an Argentine former footballer who played as a striker.

== Career ==
In the second half of 2024, Vázquez returned to Chile after his stints with both Ñublense and Huachipato and joined Deportes Puerto Montt in the Segunda División Profesional. On 13 November of the same year, he renewed with them for a year. The next year, they won the Segunda División Profesional de Chile.

Vázquez retired at the end of the 2026 season.

== Honours ==
Deportes Puerto Montt

- Segunda División Profesional de Chile: 2025

Individual

- Primera División de Chile Top Goalcorer: 2013 Apertura
