= Franco Lobos =

Chilean footballer (born 1999)

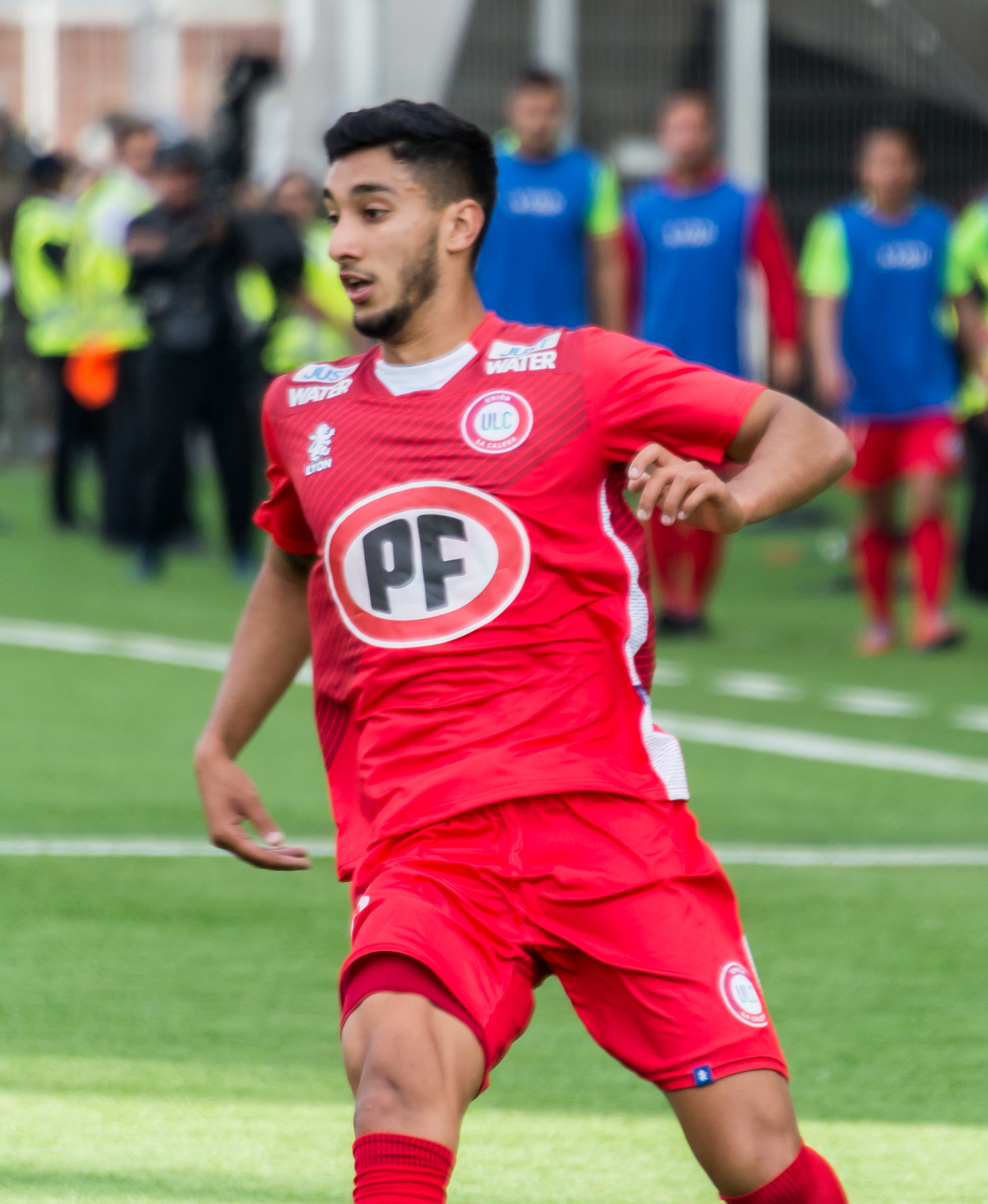
- Lobos with Unión La Calera in 2019

Personal information
- Full name: César Franco Lobos Asman
- Date of birth: February 22, 1999 (age 27)
- Place of birth: Santiago, Chile
- Height: 1.81 m (5 ft 11 1/2 in)
- Position: Forward

Team information
- Current team: Unión San Felipe (on loan from Santiago Wanderers)
- Number: 11

Youth career
- Universidad de Chile

Senior career*
Years	Team	Apps	(Gls)
2016–2023	Universidad de Chile	41	(1)
2017–2018	→ Celta Vigo B (loan)	2	(0)
2019	→ Unión La Calera (loan)	19	(2)
2024	Cobresal	21	(0)
2025	Unión La Calera	22	(0)
2026–	Santiago Wanderers	6	(0)
2026–	→ Unión San Felipe (loan)	0	(0)
- * Club domestic league appearances and goals as of 23 January 2025

César Franco Lobos Asman (born 22 February 1999), known as Franco Lobos, is a Chilean footballer who plays as a forward for Unión San Felipe on loan from Santiago Wanderers.

== Career ==
A product of Universidad de Chile youth system, Lobos played for them until the end of the 2023 season.

In 2024, Lobos signed with Cobresal. The next year, he switched to Unión La Calera.

On 5 January 2026, Lobos joined Santiago Wanderers. He was loaned out to Unión San Felipe for the second half of the year.

== Career statistics ==
=== Club ===
Club	Season	League		Continental		Cup		Total	
Club	Season	Apps	Goals	Apps	Goals	Apps	Goals	Apps	Goals
Universidad de Chile	2015–16	1	0	0	0	0	0	1	0
Universidad de Chile	2016–17	0	0	0	0	0	0	0	0
Universidad de Chile	Total	1	0	0	0	0	0	1	0
Career total		1	0	0	0	0	0	1	0
