= Leandro Díaz (footballer, born 1999) =

Chilean footballer

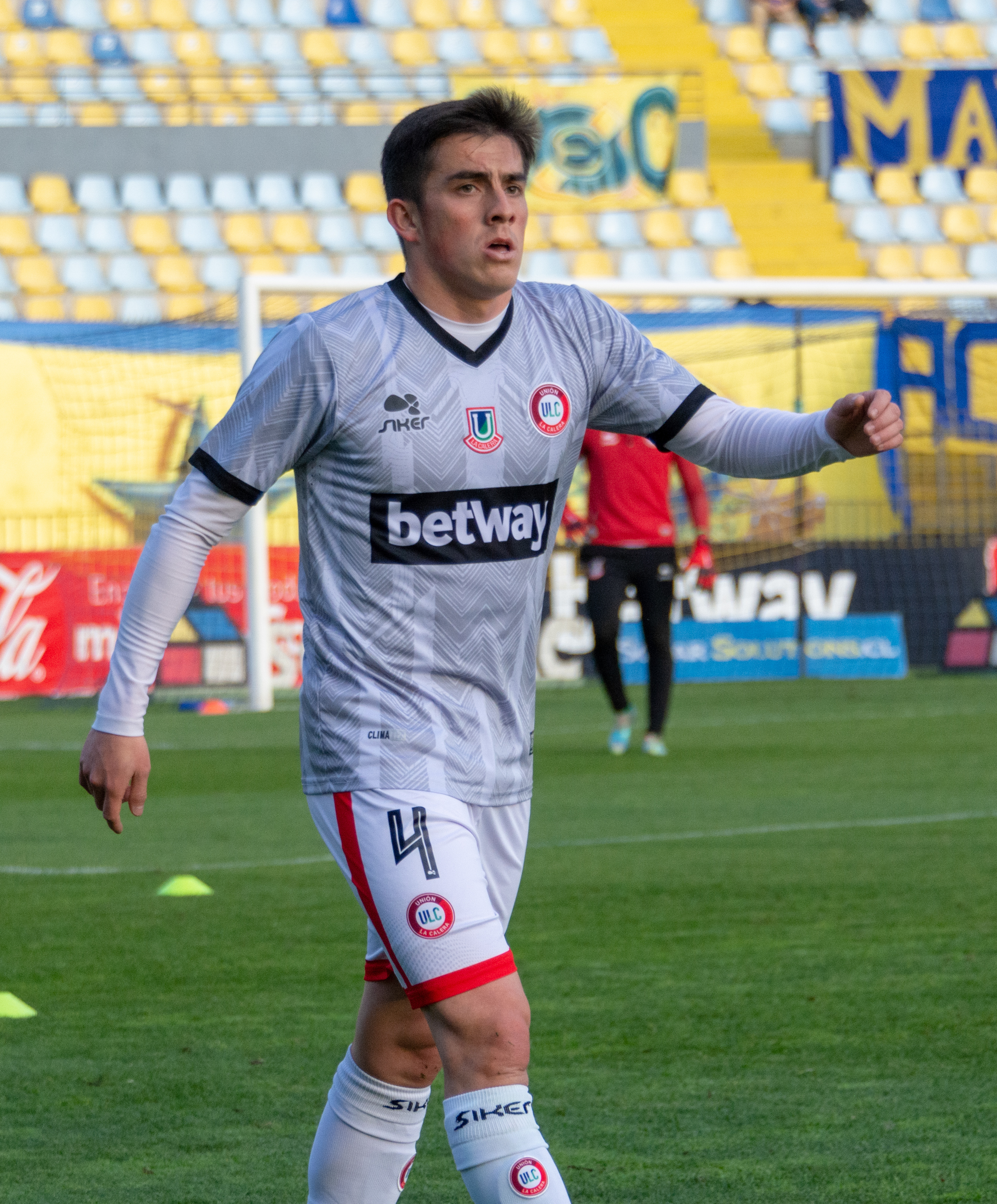
- Díaz with Unión La Calera in 2023.

Personal information
- Full name: Leandro Enrique Díaz Parra
- Date of birth: 16 March 1999 (age 27)
- Place of birth: Curicó, Chile
- Height: 1.73 m (5 ft 8 in)
- Position: Left-back

Team information
- Current team: O'Higgins

Youth career
- Universidad de Concepción

Senior career*
Years	Team	Apps	(Gls)
2019–2021	Universidad de Concepción	33	(3)
2018	→ Fernández Vial (loan)	10	(0)
2021–2022	Deportes La Serena	35	(0)
2023	Unión La Calera	25	(0)
2024–2025	Huachipato	34	(0)
2026–	O'Higgins	0	(0)
- * Club domestic league appearances and goals as of 16 September 2024

Leandro Enrique Díaz Parra (born 16 March 1999) is a Chilean professional footballer who plays as a left-back for Chilean club O'Higgins.

== Career ==
Born in Curicó, Chile, Díaz is a product of Universidad de Concepçión and made his debut with them in 2020. Previously, he had a stint on loan with Fernández Vial in 2018.

In 2021, Díaz joined Deportes La Serena. After two seasons with them, he switched to Unión La Calera.

In 2024, he joined Huachipato, then the Chilean Primera División champions.

Díaz was announced as new player for the 2026 season in 13 January for Chilean side O'Higgins.

== Honours ==
Huachipato

- Copa Chile: 2025
