= Esteban Valencia (footballer, born 1999) =

Chilean footballer

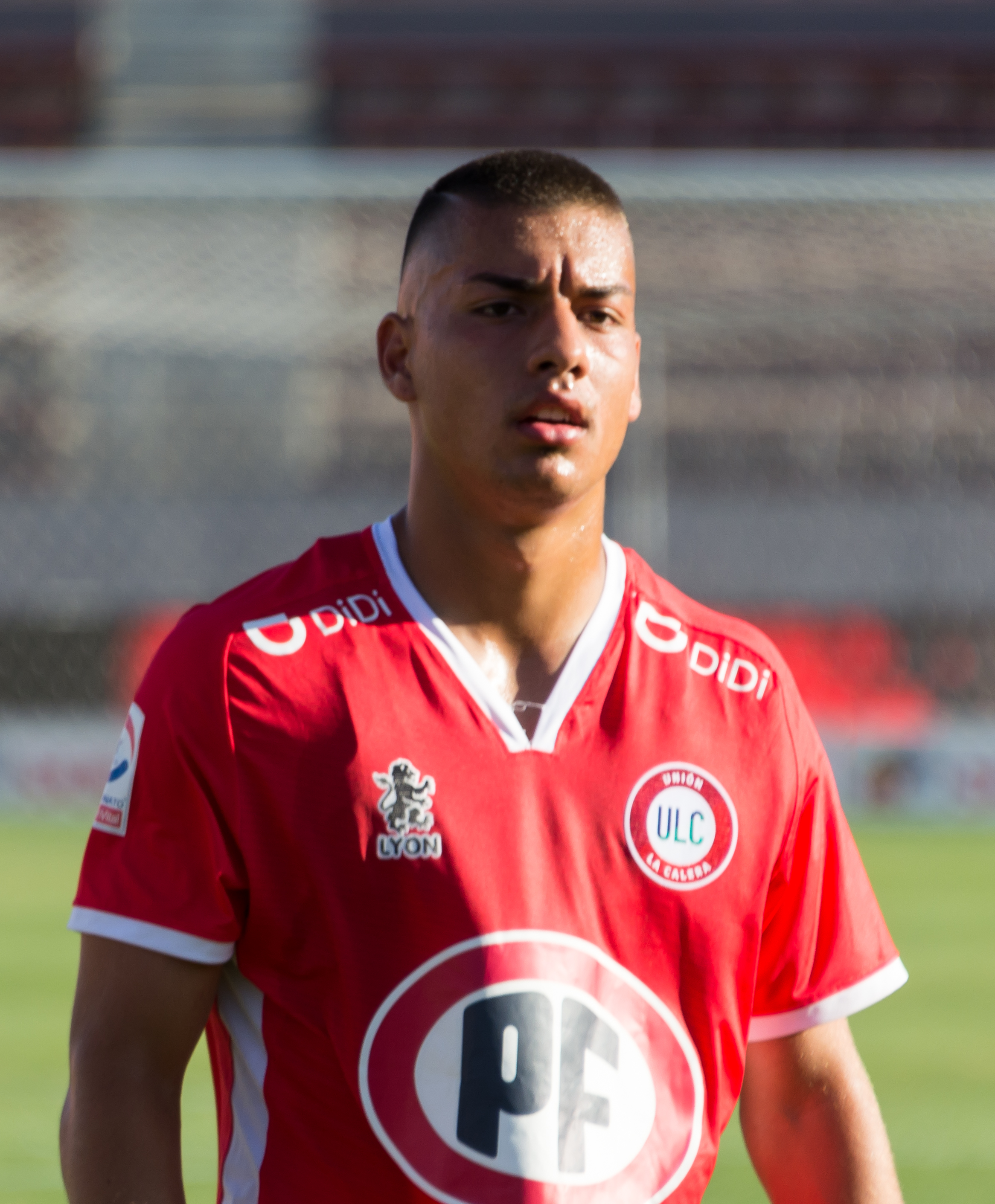
- Valencia with Unión La Calera in 2020

Personal information
- Full name: Esteban Cristóbal Valencia Reyes
- Date of birth: 13 June 1999 (age 27)
- Place of birth: Santiago, Chile
- Height: 1.72 m (5 ft 8 in)
- Position: Midfielder

Team information
- Current team: Cobresal

Youth career
- Universidad de Chile

Senior career*
Years	Team	Apps	(Gls)
2018–2021	Universidad de Chile	0	(0)
2018	→ San Marcos (loan)	13	(2)
2019–2021	→ Unión La Calera (loan)	33	(4)
2021–2024	Unión La Calera	86	(2)
2025	Ñublense	20	(0)
2026–	Cobresal	0	(0)

International career^{‡}
2018–2019	Chile U20	5	(0)
Medal record
Men's football
Representing Chile
South American Games
Gold medal – first place	2018 Cochabamba
- * Club domestic league appearances and goals as of 3 January 2026 ‡ National team caps and goals as of 25 January 2019

Esteban Cristóbal Valencia Reyes (born 13 August 1999) is a Chilean footballer who currently plays as a midfielder for Cobresal.

== Club career ==
He has played loaned at San Marcos de Arica and Unión La Calera from Universidad de Chile. Along with the Cement Team, he has played at the 2020 Copa Sudamericana.

In the 2021 season, he left Universidad de Chile to join Unión La Calera.

Valencia signed with Ñublense in 2025. The enxt season, he switched to Cobresal.

== International career ==
At under-20 level, Valencia represented Chile in both the 2018 South American Games, winning the gold medal, and the 2019 South American Championship.

== Personal life ==
He is the son of former Chilean international footballer Esteban Valencia Bascuñán, who is also a historical player of Universidad de Chile.

== Honours ==
Chile U20

- South American Games Gold medal: 2018
