= 2020 Campeonato Nacional Primera B =

Primera B de Chile
- Season: 2020
- Dates: 22 February 2020 – 7 February 2021
- Champions: Ñublense (2nd title)
- Promoted: Ñublense; Deportes Melipilla
- Relegated: Deportes Valdivia
- Matches: 218
- Goals: 543 (2.49 per match)
- Top goalscorer: Gonzalo Sosa (17 goals)
- Biggest home win: Cobreloa 6–0 Dep. Valdivia (6 January 2021); Barnechea 7–1 Rangers (17 January 2021)
- Biggest away win: S. Morning 0–4 U. San Felipe (20 September 2020); Dep. Valdivia 0–4 Dep. Temuco (22 December 2020)
- Highest scoring: Magallanes 5–5 Rangers (23 September 2020)

The 2020 Primera B de Chile, also known as Campeonato Juegaenlinea.com 2020, was the 66th season of the Primera B de Chile, Chile's second-tier football league. The competition began on 22 February 2020 and ended on 7 February 2021. Ñublense were the champions, winning their second Primera B title and earning promotion to the Chilean Primera División for the following season.

The competition was suspended from 18 March to 29 August 2020 due to the COVID-19 pandemic.

== Format ==
The tournament was played by 15 teams, 14 returning from the previous season and the Segunda División Profesional champions San Marcos de Arica. The 15 teams played each other twice (once at home and once away) for a total of 28 matches, with one team having a bye day in each round. The team that finished in first place at the end of the round-robin tournament earned promotion to the Campeonato Nacional for the 2021 season as Primera B champions. Meanwhile, the teams finishing from second to sixth place played a playoff tournament for the second promotion berth, with the season runners-up having a bye to the final.

Since no teams were relegated at the end of the previous season, a weighted table that considered the performance of teams in the previous season as well as the current one was elaborated to decide relegation. The team finishing in bottom place of this table at the end of the season was relegated to the Segunda División Profesional.

== Teams ==
=== Stadia and locations ===
Locations of the 2020 Primera B de Chile teams

Club	City	Stadium	Capacity
Barnechea	Santiago (Lo Barnechea)	Municipal de Lo Barnechea	3,000
Cobreloa	Calama	Zorros del Desierto	12,346
Deportes Copiapó	Copiapó	Luis Valenzuela Hermosilla	8,000
Deportes Melipilla	Melipilla	Municipal Roberto Bravo Santibáñez	6,000
Deportes Puerto Montt	Puerto Montt	Chinquihue	10,000
Deportes Santa Cruz	Santa Cruz	Joaquín Muñoz García	5,000
Deportes Temuco	Temuco	Germán Becker	18,413
Deportes Valdivia	Valdivia	Parque Municipal	5,397
Magallanes	Santiago (San Bernardo)	Municipal Luis Navarro Avilés	3,500
Ñublense	Chillán	Municipal Nelson Oyarzún Arenas	12,000
Rangers	Talca	Fiscal de Talca	8,200
San Luis	Quillota	Lucio Fariña Fernández	7,680
San Marcos de Arica	Arica	Carlos Dittborn	9,746
Santiago Morning	Santiago (La Pintana)	Municipal de La Pintana	6,000
Unión San Felipe	San Felipe	Municipal de San Felipe	12,000

== Effects of the COVID-19 pandemic ==
On 16 March 2020, the Asociación Nacional de Fútbol Profesional (ANFP) announced the suspension of the Primera B as well as the rest of its tournaments due to the COVID-19 pandemic, starting from 18 March 2020.

On 8 June, ANFP's Council of Presidents decided to resume the league on 31 July with matches to be played behind closed doors and clubs having at least four weeks of training sessions, pending approval from the Chilean government. However, this original date had to be pushed back as clubs were only given approval to resume training sessions starting from 16 July, with the ANFP considering the weekend of 8 August as a new tentative date of resumption, following three weeks of training sessions.

On 19 August, in a press conference held at Estadio Nacional Julio Martínez Prádanos in Santiago, Chilean President Sebastián Piñera confirmed 29 August as the date of resumption of both the first and second tier seasons, with games to be played behind closed doors. The competition eventually resumed that day, with its fifth round of matches.

== Standings ==
Pos	Team	Pld	W	D	L	GF	GA	GD	Pts	Qualification
1	Ñublense (C, P)	28	15	5	8	51	33	+18	50	Promotion to Primera División
2	Unión San Felipe	28	12	10	6	37	25	+12	46	Qualification for Promotion playoff final
3	Rangers	28	12	9	7	43	39	+4	45	Qualification for Promotion playoff quarter-finals
4	Deportes Puerto Montt	28	11	9	8	36	28	+8	42	Qualification for Promotion playoff quarter-finals
5	Deportes Melipilla (P)	28	11	9	8	30	23	+7	42	Qualification for Promotion playoff quarter-finals
6	Deportes Temuco	28	11	8	9	35	34	+1	41	Qualification for Promotion playoff quarter-finals
7	San Marcos de Arica	28	12	5	11	27	29	−2	41	
8	Magallanes	28	9	13	6	31	25	+6	40	
9	Deportes Copiapó	28	10	9	9	48	46	+2	39	
10	Cobreloa	28	9	9	10	37	33	+4	36	
11	San Luis	28	8	9	11	31	35	−4	33	
12	Santiago Morning	28	7	10	11	29	39	−10	31	
13	Barnechea	28	7	9	12	39	45	−6	30	
14	Deportes Valdivia	28	6	10	12	34	48	−14	28	
15	Deportes Santa Cruz	28	6	4	18	28	54	−26	22	

Source: ANFP, Soccerway
Rules for classification: 1) Points, 2) Goal difference, 3) Matches won, 4) Goals for, 5) Away goals for, 6) Red cards, 7) Yellow cards, 8) Drawing of lots, 9) Playoff game (only if needed to decide championship).
If needed to decide championship between two teams: 2) Playoff game.
(C) Champions; (P) Promoted

== Results ==
Home \ Away	BAR	COB	CDC	MEL	DPM	DSC	TEM	VAL	MAG	ÑUB	RAN	SL	SMA	SM	USF
Barnechea	—	2–2	3–1	0–1	1–1	2–3	1–1	3–3	2–1	2–4	7–1	2–0	2–1	1–3	1–0
Cobreloa	2–0	—	1–1	0–0	1–1	0–1	1–0	6–0	0–1	4–2	3–0	0–0	3–1	2–3	0–2
Deportes Copiapó	2–2	1–2	—	4–1	1–3	2–0	2–3	1–0	4–4	1–0	1–1	1–0	3–1	4–1	1–2
Deportes Melipilla	3–1	1–1	1–2	—	2–0	0–0	0–2	2–0	0–0	1–0	1–0	3–0	0–1	1–1	0–1
Deportes Puerto Montt	1–1	1–0	1–1	0–0	—	4–1	2–2	3–2	1–0	3–2	0–0	5–0	3–0	0–0	1–0
Deportes Santa Cruz	0–1	4–1	1–4	2–4	0–1	—	0–2	3–2	0–3	1–3	0–2	1–3	0–2	2–1	2–1
Deportes Temuco	3–1	1–0	0–0	0–3	2–1	2–1	—	0–0	1–1	1–2	0–0	0–1	2–1	0–1	1–0
Deportes Valdivia	1–1	1–1	4–2	0–1	1–0	1–0	0–4	—	1–0	2–2	0–1	1–1	2–1	2–1	2–2
Magallanes	1–1	1–1	1–1	0–0	1–0	2–0	1–0	1–1	—	0–0	5–5	1–0	0–0	1–0	1–1
Ñublense	1–0	3–2	5–0	4–0	2–0	2–2	1–2	2–1	2–1	—	4–2	2–1	1–0	2–1	2–3
Rangers	2–1	3–1	1–1	1–0	3–1	4–1	5–1	3–2	1–0	1–0	—	1–2	1–2	1–0	2–2
San Luis	4–1	0–1	2–2	1–1	2–0	0–0	3–0	3–2	0–1	0–2	1–1	—	1–2	1–1	1–2
San Marcos de Arica	1–0	3–1	2–3	1–0	0–0	2–1	1–0	1–1	1–0	0–0	0–0	0–2	—	0–1	2–1
Santiago Morning	0–0	0–1	2–1	0–3	1–2	2–1	4–4	1–1	1–1	2–1	1–1	1–1	0–1	—	0–4
Unión San Felipe	2–0	0–0	2–1	1–1	2–1	1–1	1–1	2–1	1–2	0–0	2–0	1–1	1–0	0–0	—

Source: ANFP, Soccerway
Legend: Blue = home team win; Yellow = draw; Red = away team win.

== Promotion playoff ==
Quarter-finals
5	Deportes Puerto Montt	2	0	2
4	Deportes Melipilla	2	1	3
6	Deportes Temuco	0	0	0
3	Rangers	1	1	2

Semi-final
4	Deportes Melipilla	1	2	3
3	Rangers	1	0	1

Final
4	Deportes Melipilla (p)	0	1	1 (3)
2	Unión San Felipe	1	0	1 (1)

=== Quarter-finals ===
20 January 2021
19:00

Deportes Melipilla	2–2	Deportes Puerto Montt
Vásquez 60'; Escalona 75'	Report	Lemmo 57'; Bustamante 66'

Estadio Bicentenario de La Florida, La Florida
Attendance: 0
Referee: Diego Flores
24 January 2021
10:30

Deportes Puerto Montt	0–1	Deportes Melipilla
	Report	Guerreño 33'

Estadio Regional de Chinquihue, Puerto Montt
Attendance: 0
Referee: Benjamín Saravia

Deportes Melipilla won 3–2 on aggregate and advanced to the semi-final.

21 January 2021
18:30

Deportes Temuco	0–1	Rangers
	Report	Delfino 12'

Estadio Municipal German Becker, Temuco
Attendance: 0
Referee: Juan Lara
24 January 2021
21:30

Rangers	1–0	Deportes Temuco
Ábalos 90+3' (pen.)	Report

Estadio Fiscal, Talca
Attendance: 0
Referee: Claudio Cevasco

Rangers won 2–0 on aggregate and advanced to the semi-final.

=== Semi-final ===
27 January 2021
20:00

Deportes Melipilla	1–1	Rangers
Delfino 9' (o.g.)	Report	Díaz 21'

Estadio Bicentenario de La Florida, La Florida
Attendance: 0
Referee: Héctor Jona
30 January 2021
21:30

Rangers	0–2	Deportes Melipilla
	Report	Fuenzalida 35'; Guerreño 66'

Estadio Fiscal, Talca
Attendance: 0
Referee: Rodrigo Carvajal

Deportes Melipilla won 3–1 on aggregate and advanced to the final.

=== Final ===
3 February 2021
20:00

Deportes Melipilla	0–1	Unión San Felipe
	Report	Riveros 20'

Estadio Municipal, La Pintana
Attendance: 0
Referee: José Cabero
7 February 2021
19:15

Unión San Felipe	0–1	Deportes Melipilla
	Report	Guerreño 31'
Penalties
Méndez (penalty scored); Cisterna (penalty missed); Castro (penalty missed); Mesías (penalty missed)	1–3	(penalty scored) Barrera; (penalty scored) Cortés; (penalty scored) Valdivia; (penalty missed) Garrido

Estadio Municipal, San Felipe
Attendance: 0
Referee: Roberto Tobar

Tied 1–1 on aggregate, Deportes Melipilla won on penalties and was promoted to the Chilean Primera División.

== Top goalscorers ==
Rank	Name	Club	Goals
1	(Argentina) Gonzalo Sosa	Deportes Melipilla	17
2	(Argentina) Alfredo Ábalos	Rangers	13
3	(Argentina) Leandro Garate	Barnechea	12
3	(Chile) Matías Zamora	Deportes Valdivia	12
5	(Argentina) Manuel López	Rangers	11
5	(Argentina) Oscar Ortega	Ñublense	11
7	(Argentina) Lionel Altamirano	Deportes Puerto Montt	10
7	(Uruguay) Ignacio Lemmo	Deportes Puerto Montt	10
7	(Argentina) Gabriel Tellas	Cobreloa	10
10	(Paraguay) Gustavo Guerreño	Deportes Melipilla	9
10	(Chile) Mathias Pinto	Ñublense	9
10	(Chile) Luca Pontigo	Deportes Copiapó	9

Source: Soccerway

== Relegation ==
For this season, a weighted table was elaborated by computing an average of the points earned per game over this season and the previous one, with the average of points earned in the 2019 season weighted by 60% and the average of points earned in the 2020 season weighted by 40%. Promoted team San Marcos de Arica only had their points in the 2020 season averaged, without weighting. The team placed last in this table at the end of the season was relegated.

Pos	Team	2019 Pts	2019 Pld	2019 WAvg	2020 Pts	2020 Pld	2020 WAvg	Total WAvg	Relegation
1	Ñublense	42	27	0.933	50	28	0.714	1.647	
2	Unión San Felipe	39	27	0.867	46	28	0.657	1.524	
3	Deportes Melipilla	39	26	0.9	42	28	0.6	1.5	
4	San Marcos de Arica	—	—	—	41	28	1.464	1.464	
5	Deportes Copiapó	38	26	0.877	39	28	0.557	1.434	
6	Deportes Temuco	38	27	0.844	41	28	0.586	1.43	
7	Deportes Puerto Montt	37	27	0.822	42	28	0.6	1.422	
8	Cobreloa	39	26	0.9	36	28	0.514	1.414	
9	Barnechea	40	27	0.889	30	28	0.429	1.318	
10	Rangers	28	27	0.622	45	28	0.643	1.265	
11	Santiago Morning	34	26	0.785	31	28	0.443	1.228	
12	Magallanes	25	26	0.577	40	28	0.571	1.148	
13	Deportes Santa Cruz	37	27	0.822	22	28	0.314	1.136	
14	San Luis	27	26	0.623	33	28	0.471	1.094	
15	Deportes Valdivia (R)	19	27	0.422	28	28	0.4	0.822	Relegation to Segunda División Profesional

Source: ANFP

== See also ==
- 2020 Chilean Primera División
