= 2020 Campeonato Nacional Primera División =

Campeonato Nacional
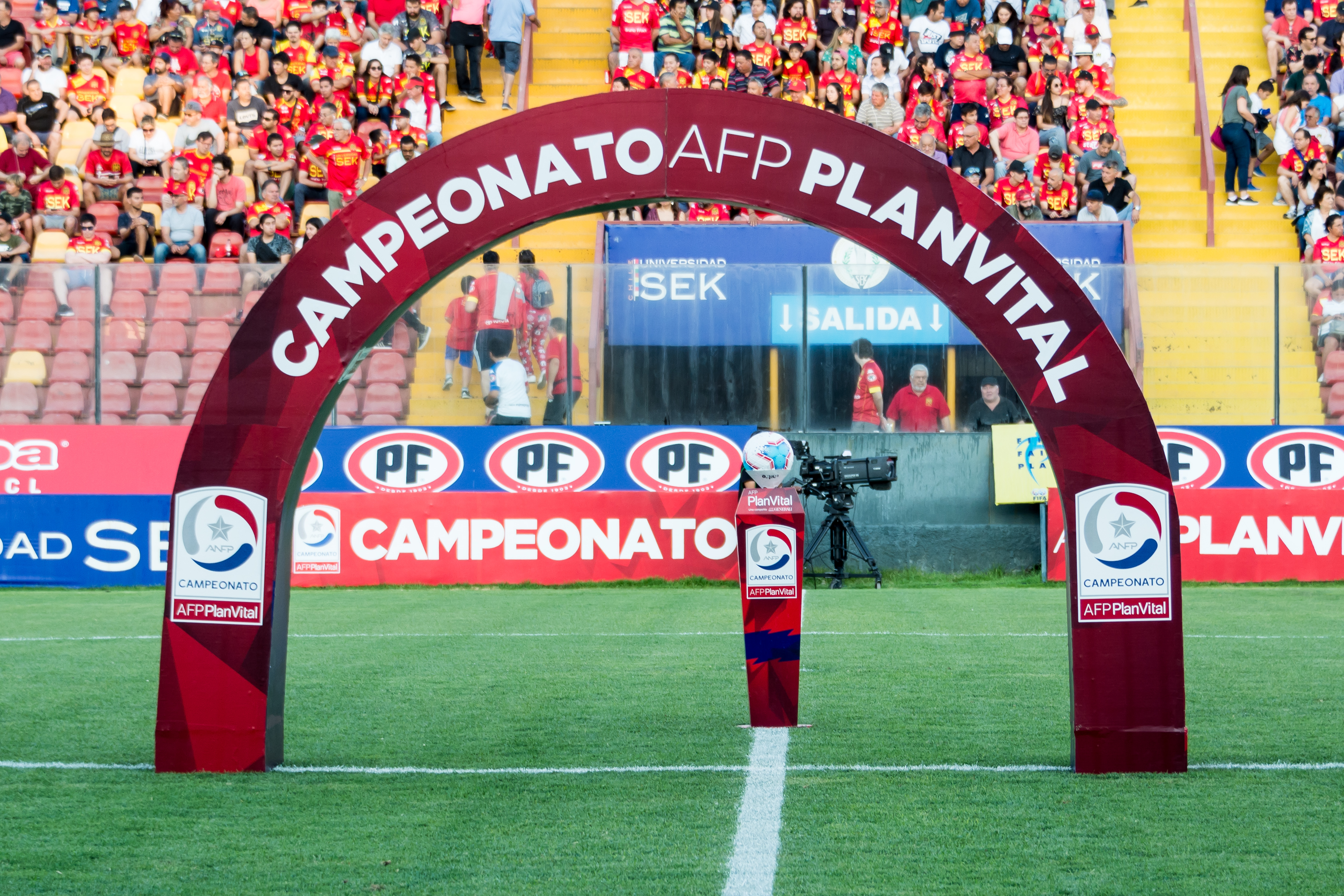
- Pre-match gateway prior to the Unión Española vs. Deportes Iquique Round 1 match
- Season: 2020
- Dates: 24 January 2020 – 17 February 2021
- Champions: Universidad Católica (15th title)
- Relegated: Coquimbo Unido; Deportes Iquique; Universidad de Concepción
- Copa Libertadores: Universidad Católica; Unión La Calera; Universidad de Chile; Unión Española
- Copa Sudamericana: Palestino; Deportes Antofagasta; Cobresal; Huachipato
- Matches: 307
- Goals: 771 (2.51 per match)
- Top goalscorer: Fernando Zampedri (20 goals)
- Biggest home win: U. de Chile 5–1 Curicó Unido (1 February 2020); Cobresal 4–0 Curicó Unido (9 September 2020); Unión La Calera 6–2 Everton (6 December 2020); Dep. Iquique 4–0 U. de Concepción (16 December 2020); Huachipato 4–0 S. Wanderers (15 January 2021)
- Biggest away win: Dep. Iquique 0–4 Dep. Antofagasta (15 February 2020)
- Highest scoring: Unión Española 4–4 Huachipato (15 March 2020); Colo-Colo 3–5 Unión Española (14 October 2020); U. Católica 5–3 Dep. Antofagasta (22 November 2020); Unión La Calera 6–2 Everton (6 December 2020)

The 2020 Chilean Primera División, known as Campeonato Nacional AFP PlanVital 2020 for sponsorship reasons, was the 90th season of the Chilean Primera División, Chile's top-flight football league. The season started on 24 January 2020 and ended on 17 February 2021 with the relegation play-off. Universidad Católica were the defending champions, having won the previous tournament. They successfully defended their title, winning their fifteenth league championship and third in a row with a game to spare on 10 February 2021 after tying 0–0 at home with eventual league runners-up Unión La Calera.

The competition was suspended from 18 March to 29 August 2020 due to the COVID-19 pandemic.

== Format changes ==
For this season, and given that the previous season was declared as concluded with no relegations to the Primera B, ANFP approved an expansion of the first tier to 18 teams, with two teams promoted from the second tier joining the 16 teams that competed in the top flight in 2019. The 18 teams played each other twice (once at home and once away) for a total of 34 matches. Qualification for the Copa Libertadores and Copa Sudamericana was awarded to the top eight teams at the end of the season. Originally, the Copa Chile champions would have been the fourth qualifier for the Copa Libertadores but since the 2020 Copa Chile would not be held before the start of the Copa Libertadores qualifying stages, its allocated berth was awarded to the fourth-placed team of the Campeonato Nacional instead.

Since there were no relegated teams in the previous season, in this season three teams were relegated to the second tier: the last-placed team in the standings of the 2020 season, the last-placed team in a relegation table which was elaborated considering the performance in both the 2019 and 2020 seasons, and the losers of a play-off between the teams placed second-to-last of both tables.

== Teams ==
Eighteen teams took part in the league in this season: the sixteen teams from the previous season, plus the 2019 Primera B champions Santiago Wanderers and Deportes La Serena, winners of the Primera B promotion play-offs.

=== Stadia and locations ===
Locations of the 2020 Chilean Primera División teams.

Team	City	Stadium	Capacity
Audax Italiano	Santiago (La Florida)	Bicentenario de La Florida	12,000
Cobresal	El Salvador	El Cobre	12,000
Colo-Colo	Santiago (Macul)	Monumental David Arellano	47,347
Coquimbo Unido	Coquimbo	Francisco Sánchez Rumoroso	18,750
Curicó Unido	Curicó	La Granja	8,278
Deportes Antofagasta	Antofagasta	Calvo y Bascuñán	21,178
Deportes Iquique	Iquique	Tierra de Campeones	13,171
Deportes La Serena	La Serena	La Portada	18,243
Everton	Viña del Mar	Sausalito	22,360
Huachipato	Talcahuano	Huachipato-CAP Acero	10,500
O'Higgins	Rancagua	El Teniente	13,849
Palestino	Santiago (La Cisterna)	Municipal de La Cisterna	8,000
Santiago Wanderers	Valparaíso	Elías Figueroa Brander	20,575
Unión Española	Santiago (Independencia)	Santa Laura-Universidad SEK	19,000
Unión La Calera	La Calera	Nicolás Chahuán Nazar	9,200
Universidad Católica	Santiago (Las Condes)	San Carlos de Apoquindo	14,118
Universidad de Chile	Santiago (Ñuñoa)	Nacional Julio Martínez Prádanos	48,665
Universidad de Concepción	Concepción	Alcaldesa Ester Roa Rebolledo	30,448

=== Personnel and kits ===
Team	Head coach	Kit manufacturer	Sponsors
Audax Italiano	(Argentina) Pablo Sánchez	Macron	Traverso
Cobresal	(Chile) Gustavo Huerta	KS7	PF
Colo-Colo	(Argentina) Gustavo Quinteros	Umbro	MG Motor
Coquimbo Unido	(Chile) Juan José Ribera	CAFU	PF
Curicó Unido	(Argentina) Martín Palermo	OneFit	Multihogar
Deportes Antofagasta	(Chile) Héctor Tapia	CAFU	Minera Escondida
Deportes Iquique	(Chile) Cristian Leiva	Rete	UNAP
Deportes La Serena	(Chile) Miguel Ponce	OneFit	
Everton	(Argentina) Roberto Sensini	Charly	Claro
Huachipato	(Argentina) Juan Luvera (caretaker)	OneFit	PF
O'Higgins	(Argentina) Dalcio Giovagnoli	Adidas	Sun Monticello
Palestino	(Chile) José Luis Sierra	Capelli Sport	Bank of Palestine
Santiago Wanderers	(Chile) Miguel Ramírez	Macron	TPS
Unión Española	(Chile) Jorge Pellicer	Kappa	Universidad SEK
Unión La Calera	(Argentina) Juan Pablo Vojvoda	OneFit	PF
Universidad Católica	(Argentina) Ariel Holan	Under Armour	BICE
Universidad de Chile	(Venezuela) Rafael Dudamel	Adidas	Petrobras
Universidad de Concepción	(Chile) Hugo Balladares	KS7	PF

=== Managerial changes ===
Team	Outgoing manager	Manner of departure	Date of vacancy	Position in table	Incoming manager	Date of appointment
O'Higgins	(Chile) Marco Antonio Figueroa	End of contract	1 December 2019	Pre-season	(Argentina) Patricio Graff	11 December 2019
Curicó Unido	(Chile) Hugo Vilches	Sacked	3 December 2019	Pre-season	(Argentina) Nicolás Larcamón	5 December 2019
Universidad Católica	(Argentina) Gustavo Quinteros	Signed by Tijuana	4 December 2019	Pre-season	(Argentina) Ariel Holan	12 December 2019
Unión La Calera	(Argentina) Walter Coyette	Resigned	5 December 2019	Pre-season	(Argentina) Juan Pablo Vojvoda	29 December 2019
Universidad de Concepción	(Chile) Francisco Bozán	End of contract	10 December 2019	Pre-season	(Uruguay) Eduardo Acevedo	28 December 2019
Coquimbo Unido	(Argentina) Patricio Graff	Signed by O'Higgins	11 December 2018	Pre-season	(Argentina) Germán Corengia	18 December 2019
Audax Italiano	(Chile) Juan José Ribera	Mutual consent	12 December 2019	Pre-season	(Argentina) Francisco Meneghini	16 December 2019
Colo-Colo	(Chile) Mario Salas	Sacked	25 February 2020	14th	(Paraguay) Gualberto Jara (caretaker)	25 February 2020
Deportes Antofagasta	(Argentina) Juan Manuel Azconzábal	Signed by Unión de Santa Fe	30 June 2020	5th	(Argentina) Héctor Almandoz	18 July 2020
Coquimbo Unido	(Argentina) Germán Corengia	Sacked	2 September 2020	16th	(Chile) Juan José Ribera	6 September 2020
Deportes Iquique	(Chile) Jaime Vera	Resigned	24 September 2020	15th	(Chile) Cristian Leiva	25 September 2020
Deportes La Serena	(Chile) Francisco Bozán	Resigned	3 October 2020	18th	(Chile) Óscar Correa (caretaker)	3 October 2020
Colo-Colo	(Paraguay) Gualberto Jara	End of caretaker spell	3 October 2020	17th	(Argentina) Gustavo Quinteros	3 October 2020
O'Higgins	(Argentina) Patricio Graff	Mutual consent	9 October 2020	15th	(Chile) Víctor Fuentes (caretaker)	10 October 2020
Deportes La Serena	(Chile) Óscar Correa	End of caretaker spell	13 October 2020	18th	(Chile) Miguel Ponce	13 October 2020
O'Higgins	(Chile) Víctor Fuentes	End of caretaker spell	15 October 2020	16th	(Argentina) Dalcio Giovagnoli	16 October 2020
Universidad de Chile	(Chile) Hernán Caputto	Sacked	3 November 2020	5th	(Chile) Marcelo Jara (caretaker)	3 November 2020
Palestino	(Chile) Ivo Basay	Sacked	9 November 2020	15th	(Chile) José Luis Sierra	11 November 2020
Universidad de Chile	(Chile) Marcelo Jara	End of caretaker spell	19 November 2020	6th	(Venezuela) Rafael Dudamel	5 November 2020 (Note: Taking office on 20 November 2020 after being quarantined for COVID-19.)
Curicó Unido	(Argentina) Nicolás Larcamón	Resigned	19 November 2020	5th	(Chile) Damián Muñoz (caretaker)	19 November 2020
Curicó Unido	(Chile) Damián Muñoz	End of caretaker spell	25 November 2020	4th	(Argentina) Martín Palermo	23 November 2020
Deportes Antofagasta	(Argentina) Héctor Almandoz	Mutual consent	2 December 2020	5th	(Chile) Diego Reveco (caretaker)	2 December 2020
Audax Italiano	(Argentina) Francisco Meneghini	Mutual consent	4 December 2020	10th	(Chile) José Calderón (caretaker)	9 December 2020
Deportes Antofagasta	(Chile) Diego Reveco	End of caretaker spell	10 December 2020	6th	(Chile) Héctor Tapia	10 December 2020
Everton	(Argentina) Javier Torrente	Sacked	17 December 2020	12th	(Argentina) Roberto Sensini	20 December 2020
Audax Italiano	(Chile) José Calderón	End of caretaker spell	20 December 2020	15th	(Argentina) Pablo Sánchez	20 December 2020
Universidad de Concepción	(Uruguay) Eduardo Acevedo	Resigned	28 December 2020	13th	(Chile) Hugo Balladares	30 December 2020
Huachipato	(Paraguay) Gustavo Florentín	Sacked	6 January 2021	11th	(Argentina) Juan Luvera (caretaker)	6 January 2021
Unión Española	(Chile) Ronald Fuentes	Sacked	28 January 2021	3rd	(Chile) César Bravo (caretaker)	28 January 2021
Unión Española	(Chile) César Bravo	End of caretaker spell	31 January 2021	3rd	(Chile) Jorge Pellicer	1 February 2021

== Effects of the COVID-19 pandemic ==
On 16 March 2020, the Asociación Nacional de Fútbol Profesional (ANFP) announced the suspension of the Campeonato Nacional as well as the rest of its tournaments due to the COVID-19 pandemic, starting from 18 March 2020.

On 8 June, ANFP's Council of Presidents decided to resume the league on 31 July with matches to be played behind closed doors and clubs having at least four weeks of training sessions, pending approval from the Chilean government. However, this original date had to be pushed back as clubs were only given approval to resume training sessions starting from 16 July, with the ANFP considering the weekend of 8 August as a new tentative date of resumption, following three weeks of training sessions.

On 19 August, in a press conference held at Estadio Nacional Julio Martínez Prádanos in Santiago, Chilean President Sebastián Piñera confirmed 29 August as the date of resumption of both the first and second tier seasons, with games to be played behind closed doors. The first matches to be played would be the ones postponed from previous rounds, while the ninth round of the Campeonato Nacional would be played on the weekend of 4–6 September.

On 26 September the match between Colo-Colo and Deportes Antofagasta, scheduled to be played on that day at 11:00, was suspended due to the discovery of a positive COVID-19 case in the former team following their return from Brazil where they played a Copa Libertadores group stage match against Athletico Paranaense. It was eventually rescheduled for 10 November at 11:00, with Colo-Colo fined for the postponement of the match as well as the delay to submit their PCR test results prior to said match.

On 11 December, the ANFP announced the suspension of the Round 23 matches between Universidad de Chile and Deportes Iquique and between Unión La Calera and O'Higgins due to positive cases for COVID-19 being reported in Deportes Iquique and Unión La Calera.

== Standings ==
Pos	Team	Pld	W	D	L	GF	GA	GD	Pts	Qualification or relegation
1	Universidad Católica (C)	34	18	11	5	65	35	+30	65	Qualification for Copa Libertadores group stage
2	Unión La Calera	34	17	6	11	59	41	+18	57	Qualification for Copa Libertadores group stage
3	Universidad de Chile	34	13	13	8	49	33	+16	52	Qualification for Copa Libertadores second stage
4	Unión Española	34	14	10	10	55	53	+2	52	Qualification for Copa Libertadores second stage
5	Palestino	34	14	9	11	49	45	+4	51	Qualification for Copa Sudamericana first stage
6	Deportes Antofagasta	34	12	12	10	43	42	+1	48	Qualification for Copa Sudamericana first stage
7	Cobresal	34	13	8	13	45	40	+5	47	Qualification for Copa Sudamericana first stage
8	Huachipato	34	13	7	14	43	44	−1	46	Qualification for Copa Sudamericana first stage
9	Curicó Unido	34	13	7	14	40	52	−12	46	
10	O'Higgins	34	12	9	13	40	39	+1	45	
11	Santiago Wanderers	34	12	8	14	42	53	−11	44	
12	Everton	34	10	13	11	37	41	−4	43	
13	Audax Italiano	34	10	11	13	47	50	−3	41	
14	Universidad de Concepción	34	9	14	11	38	46	−8	41	
15	Deportes La Serena	34	10	9	15	34	41	−7	39	
16	Colo-Colo (O)	34	9	12	13	33	43	−10	39	Qualification for Relegation play-off
17	Deportes Iquique (R)	34	9	11	14	38	46	−8	38	Relegation to Primera B (Note: Deportes Iquique were relegated as the bottom-placed team of the weighted table.)
18	Coquimbo Unido (R)	34	9	8	17	33	46	−13	35	Relegation to Primera B

Source: ANFP, Soccerway
Rules for classification: 1) Points, 2) Playoff game (only if needed to decide championship between two teams), 3) Goal difference, 4) Matches won, 5) Goals for, 6) Away goals for, 7) Red cards, 8) Yellow cards, 9) Drawing of lots.
(C) Champions; (O) Play-off winners; (R) Relegated

== Results ==
Home \ Away	AUD	CSL	CC	COQ	CUR	ANT	IQQ	DLS	EVE	HUA	OHI	PAL	SW	UE	ULC	UC	UCH	UDC
Audax Italiano	—	4–1	2–1	2–0	0–0	3–0	1–1	2–1	1–2	2–0	2–1	0–1	1–1	2–2	1–3	2–2	1–3	1–1
Cobresal	1–2	—	2–1	0–1	4–0	3–1	1–1	1–2	1–1	2–1	1–1	2–1	1–0	4–1	1–1	0–1	2–0	3–1
Colo-Colo	1–0	0–0	—	2–1	0–2	1–0	0–2	0–2	1–0	0–1	0–1	3–0	2–3	3–5	2–1	0–2 (Note: Match suspended after 72 minutes of play due to crowd disturbances. On 18 February, ANFP decided not to play the remainder of the match and awarded it to Universidad Católica, with the final score as it stood at the time of suspension.)	0–0	2–2
Coquimbo Unido	0–0	0–1	2–2	—	0–0	0–1	0–3	2–1	3–0	1–2	0–3	1–0	2–1	1–1	1–2	2–1	0–1	0–2
Curicó Unido	4–1	0–1	1–0	2–1	—	2–0	1–0	1–0	1–3	1–0	1–3	1–0	1–3	2–4	0–2	3–2	0–0	2–2
Deportes Antofagasta	2–2	2–1	0–1	2–1	0–0	—	3–1	2–2	1–1	2–1	1–0	1–1	1–1	2–0	3–1	2–3	1–0	1–1
Deportes Iquique	2–1	0–0	0–0	2–2	1–2	0–4	—	2–0	2–2	1–0	1–0	0–2	2–0	1–1	0–3	0–1	0–2	4–0
Deportes La Serena	0–2	1–2	1–2	1–0	2–0	0–1	1–0	—	1–1	1–0	1–1	4–2	3–0	0–2	0–3	1–2	0–0	0–1
Everton	2–1	3–0	1–1	1–0	3–1	0–0	1–0	0–0	—	1–0	0–1	1–3	2–2	1–2	0–1	2–2	1–1	2–1
Huachipato	2–1	1–0	2–2	0–1	1–0	0–0	1–1	1–1	1–0	—	2–0	1–0	4–0	4–1	4–3	1–3	2–1	1–1
O'Higgins	0–0	0–2	1–1	1–4	2–2	0–1	2–2	1–1	1–2	2–1	—	1–0	2–1	1–3	1–2	2–0	2–3	0–0
Palestino	1–0	3–2	3–1	2–2	4–2	2–2	2–0	1–3	1–0	1–0	0–0	—	3–1	2–2	3–1	1–4	2–2	0–1
Santiago Wanderers	3–3	1–0	3–0	1–1	2–0	2–1	3–1	0–0	2–1	3–2	1–0	1–2	—	1–0	0–3	0–3	1–2	1–1
Unión Española	1–2	1–0	1–2	0–1	2–1	1–1	3–2	1–1	2–0	4–4	0–2	1–1	2–1	—	3–2	1–1	3–1	1–1
Unión La Calera	3–2	2–2	0–0	2–0	2–3	1–1	1–2	2–1	6–2	3–0	0–1	1–0	3–0	1–0	—	1–1	1–0	1–2
Universidad Católica	3–0	2–1	0–0	4–1	1–1	5–3	3–1	3–0	1–1	3–0	3–2	2–3	1–1	0–1	0–0	—	3–0	1–1
Universidad de Chile	2–2	2–1	1–1	1–1	5–1	3–1	2–2	3–0	0–0	2–2	0–1	1–1	3–0	3–0	3–0	0–0	—	2–0
Universidad de Concepción	3–1	2–2	1–1	2–1	1–2	2–0	1–1	0–2	0–0	0–1	1–4	1–1	0–2	2–3	2–1	2–1	1–0	—

Source: ANFP, Soccerway
Legend: Blue = home team win; Yellow = draw; Red = away team win.

== Top goalscorers ==
Rank	Name	Club	Goals
1	(Argentina) Fernando Zampedri	Universidad Católica	20
2	(Argentina) Joaquín Larrivey	Universidad de Chile	19
3	(Panama) Cecilio Waterman	Universidad de Concepción	17
4	(Uruguay) Cristian Palacios	Unión Española	15
4	(Argentina) Juan Sánchez Sotelo	Huachipato	15
6	(Chile) Andrés Vilches	Unión La Calera	14
7	(Argentina) Juan Cuevas	Everton	13
7	(Argentina) Enzo Gutiérrez	Santiago Wanderers	13
7	(Chile) Luis Jiménez	Palestino	13
10	(Argentina) Luciano Aued	Universidad Católica	10
10	(Venezuela) Eduard Bello	Deportes Antofagasta	10
10	(Argentina) Federico Castro	Curicó Unido	10
10	(Chile) Misael Dávila	Unión Española	10

Source: Soccerway

== Relegation ==
=== Weighted table ===
For this season, a weighted table was elaborated by computing an average of the points earned per game over this season and the previous one, with the average of points earned in the 2019 season weighted by 60% and the average of points earned in the 2020 season weighted by 40%. Promoted teams only had their points in the 2020 season averaged, without weighting. The team placed last in this table at the end of the season was relegated, while the team placed second-to-last qualified for the relegation play-off.

Pos	Team	2019 Pts	2019 Pld	2019 WAvg	2020 Pts	2020 Pld	2020 WAvg	Total WAvg	Relegation
1	Universidad Católica	53	24	1.325	65	34	0.765	2.09	
2	Palestino	38	24	0.95	51	34	0.6	1.574	
3	Unión La Calera	37	25	0.888	57	34	0.671	1.559	
4	Colo-Colo	40	24	1	39	34	0.459	1.459	
5	Unión Española	34	25	0.816	52	34	0.612	1.428	
6	Huachipato	34	24	0.85	46	34	0.541	1.391	
7	O'Higgins	34	24	0.85	45	34	0.529	1.379	
8	Cobresal	34	25	0.816	47	34	0.553	1.369	
9	Audax Italiano	34	24	0.85	41	34	0.482	1.332	
10	Santiago Wanderers	—	—	—	44	34	1.294	1.294	
11	Coquimbo Unido	34	24	0.85	35	34	0.412	1.262	
12	Deportes Antofagasta	27	24	0.675	48	34	0.565	1.24	
13	Everton	29	24	0.725	43	34	0.506	1.231	
14	Universidad de Chile	24	24	0.6	52	34	0.612	1.212	
15	Curicó Unido	26	24	0.65	46	34	0.541	1.191	
16	Deportes La Serena	—	—	—	39	34	1.147	1.147	
17	Universidad de Concepción (R)	23	24	0.575	41	34	0.482	1.057	Qualification for Relegation play-off
18	Deportes Iquique (R)	25	25	0.6	38	34	0.447	1.047	Relegation to Primera B

Source: ANFP

=== Relegation play-off ===
The relegation play-off was a single match played by the teams placed second-to-last in the season table and the weighted table, on neutral ground. If the same team was placed 17th in both tables, the play-off would not be played and that team would be automatically relegated, but if one of the teams in 17th position had been already relegated by placing last in either table, the team placed 16th in the table where the relegated team placed 17th would play the play-off. The losers were the third and last team relegated to the Primera B.

17 February 2021
18:00

Colo-Colo	1–0	Universidad de Concepción
Solari 19'	Report

Estadio Fiscal, Talca
Attendance: 0
Referee: Julio Bascuñán

== Awards ==
Award	Winner	Club
Best Player	(Argentina) Matías Dituro	Universidad Católica
Top goalscorer	(Argentina) Fernando Zampedri	Universidad Católica
Best Foreign Player	(Argentina) Matías Dituro	Universidad Católica
Best Manager	(Argentina) Ariel Holan	Universidad Católica
Best U-21 Player	(Chile) Carlos Palacios	Unión Española

=== Team of the Season ===

Team of the Season
Goalkeeper	Defenders	Midfielders	Forwards
(Argentina) Matías Dituro (Universidad Católica)	(Chile) Eric Wiemberg (Unión La Calera) (Chile) Valber Huerta (Universidad Católica) (Argentina) Santiago García (Unión La Calera) (Chile) Yonathan Andía (Unión La Calera)	(Chile) Ignacio Saavedra (Universidad Católica) (Chile) Juan Leiva (Unión La Calera) (Chile) Luis Antonio Jiménez (Palestino)	(Chile) Carlos Palacios (Unión Española) (Argentina) Fernando Zampedri (Universidad Católica) (Argentina) Edson Puch (Universidad Católica)

== See also ==
- 2020 Primera B de Chile
