= Gonzalo Sosa =

Argentine footballer

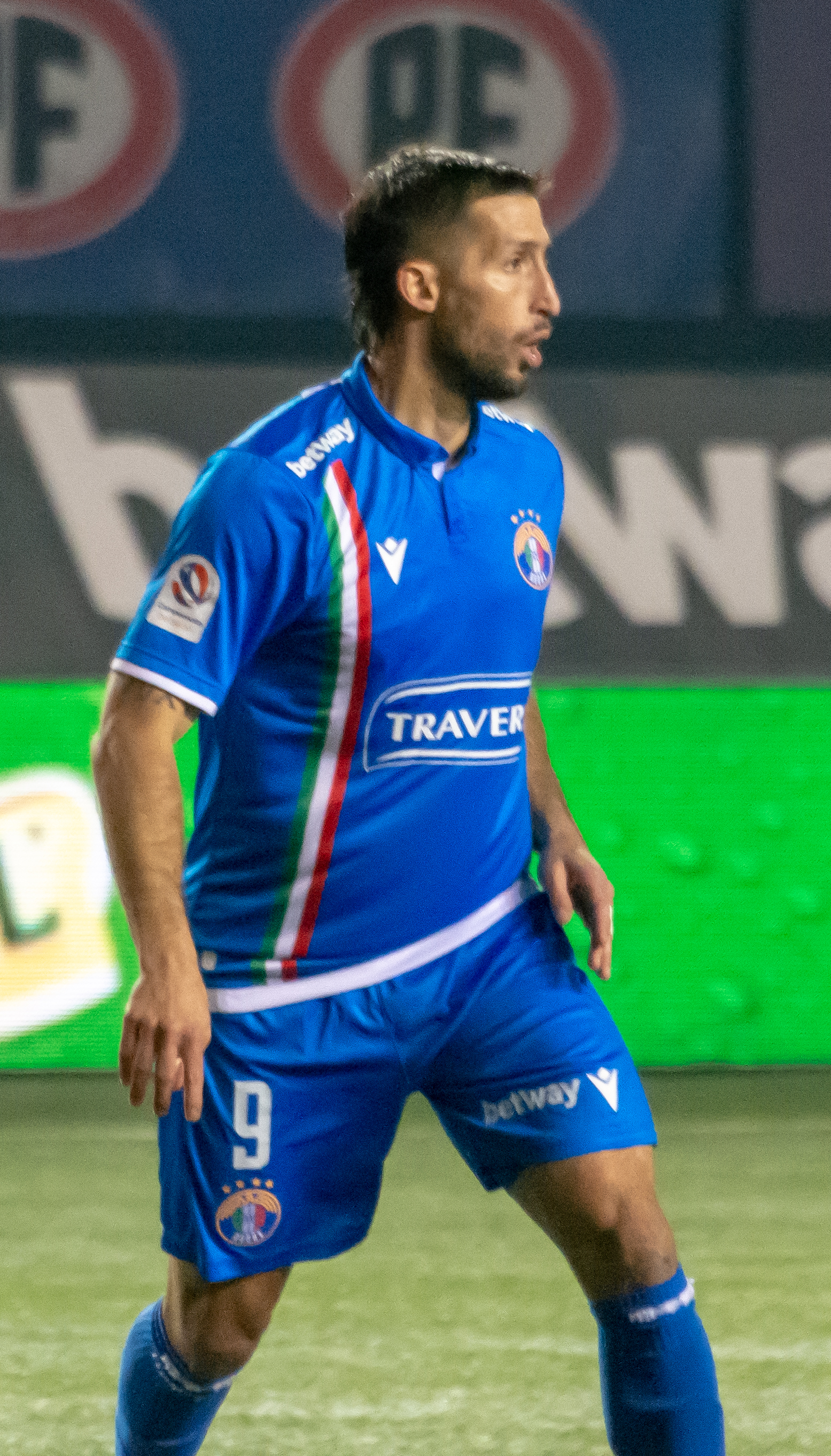
- Sosa with Audax Italiano in 2023

Personal information
- Full name: Gonzalo Ariel Sosa
- Date of birth: 4 January 1989 (age 37)
- Place of birth: Santa Fe, Argentina
- Height: 1.85 m (6 ft 1 in)
- Position: Striker

Team information
- Current team: Deportes Limache

Youth career
- 1994–1997: Escalante
- 1997–2008: Unión Santa Fe
- 2008–2009: Atlanta

Senior career*
Years	Team	Apps	(Gls)
2009–2011	Atlanta	3	(0)
2011–2012	Barracas Central	16	(1)
2012–2014	Colegiales	31	(4)
2014	Sportivo Italiano	10	(1)
2015	Gimnasia CdU	29	(10)
2016	Guaraní Antonio Franco	8	(1)
2016–2017	Gimnasia CdU	25	(13)
2017–2018	Magallanes	40	(15)
2019–2021	Deportes Melipilla	84	(52)
2022	Mazatlán	29	(5)
2023	Audax Italiano	26	(10)
2024	Palestino	22	(8)
2025	Ñublense	26	(9)
2026–	Deportes Limache	0	(0)
- * Club domestic league appearances and goals as of 25 December 2024

Gonzalo Ariel Sosa (born 4 January 1989) is an Argentine footballer who plays as a striker for Chilean club Deportes Limache.

== Career ==
=== Early career ===
Born in Santa Fe, Sosa joined Unión de Santa Fe's youth system at the age of eight, from a local side named Club Escalante. After leaving the club at the age of 19, he made his senior debut with Primera B Metropolitana side Atlanta, after being promoted to the first team in June 2009. However, he only signed his professional contract with the side in June 2010.

After Atlanta's promotion from the third division, Sosa moved to Barracas Central also in that category in 2011, and started to feature more regularly. In 2012, he joined fellow league team Colegiales, where he was deemed surplus to requirements in December of that year, but later remained playing at the side.

After leaving Colegiales in June 2014, Sosa played for a brief period for Sportivo Italiano before agreeing to a contract with Torneo Federal A side Gimnasia y Esgrima de Concepción del Uruguay for the 2015 season. After scoring in a regular basis for the side, he moved to Guaraní Antonio Franco in January 2016, where he would play just eight matches before returning to Gimnasia on 8 August.

In December 2025, Sosa signed with Deportes Limache.

=== Magallanes ===
On 22 July 2017, Sosa moved abroad for the first time in his career, after signing a contract with Primera B de Chile side Magallanes. He was the club's top goalscorer in the 2017 Transición tournament with five goals, and scored a further ten times in the 2018 edition, again the best of his team.

=== Deportes Melipilla ===
On 28 December 2018, Sosa signed for fellow Chilean second division side Deportes Melipilla. In the 2020 season, he was the division's top goalscorer with 17 goals, being a key unit as the club achieved promotion to the Chilean Primera División.

Sosa continued his goalscoring form in the 2021 campaign, scoring 23 goals but being unable to prevent Melipilla's relegation.

=== Mazatlán ===
On 23 December 2021, Sosa moved to Liga MX side Mazatlán, after rejecting offers from Chilean sides Colo-Colo and Universidad Católica. Despite featuring regularly, he left the club on 26 December 2022.

=== Audax Italiano ===
On 3 January 2023, Sosa returned to Chile and signed a contract with Audax Italiano.

=== Palestino ===
In 2024, Sosa signed with Palestino.

=== Ñublense ===
Sosa joined Ñublense for the 2025 season.

== Career statistics ==
As of 27 May 2023.

Club	Season	League			Cup		Continental		Other		Total	
Club	Season	Division	Apps	Goals	Apps	Goals	Apps	Goals	Apps	Goals	Apps	Goals
Atlanta	2009–10	Primera B Metropolitana	2	0	—		—		—		2	0
Atlanta	2010–11	Primera B Metropolitana	1	0	—		—		—		1	0
Atlanta	Total		3	0	—		—		—		3	0
Barracas Central	2011–12	Primera B Metropolitana	16	1	2	0	—		—		18	1
Colegiales	2012–13	Primera B Metropolitana	11	2	—		—		—		11	2
Colegiales	2013–14	Primera B Metropolitana	20	2	1	1	—		—		21	3
Colegiales	Total		31	4	1	1	—		—		32	5
Sportivo Italiano	2014	Primera B Metropolitana	10	1	—		—		—		10	1
Gimnasia CdU	2015	Torneo Federal A	29	10	—		—		—		29	10
Guaraní Antonio Franco	2016	Torneo Federal A	8	1	—		—		—		8	1
Gimnasia CdU	2016–17	Torneo Federal A	25	13	—		—		—		25	13
Magallanes	2017	Primera B de Chile	15	5	—		—		—		15	5
Magallanes	2018	Primera B de Chile	25	10	3	1	—		—		28	11
Magallanes	Total		40	15	3	1	—		—		43	16
Deportes Melipilla	2019	Primera B de Chile	23	12	3	1	—		—		26	13
Deportes Melipilla	2020	Primera B de Chile	33	17	0	0	—		—		33	17
Deportes Melipilla	2021	Chilean Primera División	28	23	2	0	—		—		30	23
Deportes Melipilla	Total		84	52	5	1	—		—		89	53
Mazatlán	2021–22	Liga MX	15	4	—		—		—		15	4
Mazatlán	2022–23	Liga MX	14	1	0	0	—		—		14	1
Mazatlán	Total		29	5	0	0	—		—		29	5
Audax Italiano	2023	Chilean Primera División	13	6	1	1	5 (Note: Appearance(s) in Copa Sudamericana)	4	—		19	11
Career total			288	108	12	4	5	4	0	0	305	116

== Honours ==
Atlanta

- Primera B Metropolitana: 2010–11

Individual

- Primera B de Chile top scorer: 2020
- Chilean Primera División top scorer: 2021
