= Francisco Sepúlveda =

Francisco Sepúlveda may refer to:

- Francisco Xavier Sepúlveda (1747–1788), Mexican colonial military officer and founder of the Sepúlveda family of California
- Francisco Sepúlveda II (1775–1853), his son
- Francisco Sepúlveda (footballer), Chilean footballer

== See also ==
- Sepúlveda family of California
