= Bayron =

Bayron is a masculine given name. Notable people with this name include:

- Bayron Biswas (born 1982), Indian politician
- Bayron Matos (born 2000), Dominican-American football player
- Bayron Molina (born 1993), Honduran boxer
- Bayron Piedra (born 1982), Ecuadorian runner
- Bayron Saavedra (born 1997), Chilean football player
