= Benjamín Rivera =

Benjamín Rivera may refer to:

- Benjamín Rivera (footballer) (born 1999), Chilean footballer
- Benjamín Rivera Noriega Airport, a Puerto Rican airport
