= 1990 Campeonato Nacional Segunda División =

Segunda División
- Season: 1990
- Champions: Provincial Osorno
- Promoted: Provincial Osorno; Coquimbo Unido; Deportes Antofagasta
- Relegated: San Luis de Quillota; General Velásquez; Curicó Unido; Deportes Valdivia

The 1990 Segunda División de Chile was the 39th season of the Segunda División de Chile.

Provincial Osorno was the tournament's champion.

== First phase ==
=== North Zone ===
| Pos | Team | Pld | W | D | L | GF | GA | GD | Pts | Qualification |
|---|---|---|---|---|---|---|---|---|---|---|
| 1 | Coquimbo Unido | 22 | 11 | 6 | 5 | 32 | 18 | +14 | 28 | Clasifica a Liguilla Ascenso Norte |
| 2 | Deportes Antofagasta | 22 | 11 | 5 | 6 | 26 | 18 | +8 | 27 | Clasifica a Liguilla Ascenso Norte |
| 3 | Audax Italiano | 22 | 9 | 9 | 4 | 32 | 17 | +15 | 27 | Clasifica a Liguilla Ascenso Norte |
| 4 | Regional Atacama | 22 | 9 | 6 | 7 | 26 | 22 | +4 | 24 | Clasifica a Liguilla Ascenso Norte |
| 5 | Unión San Felipe | 22 | 9 | 6 | 7 | 33 | 36 | −3 | 24 | Clasifica a Liguilla Ascenso Norte |
| 6 | Magallanes | 22 | 7 | 8 | 7 | 27 | 25 | +2 | 22 | Clasifica a Liguilla Ascenso Norte |
| 7 | Deportes Ovalle | 22 | 5 | 12 | 5 | 16 | 18 | −2 | 22 | Clasifica a Liguilla Descenso Norte |
| 8 | Cobreandino | 22 | 7 | 7 | 8 | 21 | 23 | −2 | 21 | Clasifica a Liguilla Descenso Norte |
| 9 | Soinca Bata Melipilla | 22 | 7 | 7 | 8 | 25 | 29 | −4 | 21 | Clasifica a Liguilla Descenso Norte |
| 10 | Deportes Arica | 22 | 5 | 9 | 8 | 14 | 19 | −5 | 19 | Clasifica a Liguilla Descenso Norte |
| 11 | San Luis de Quillota | 22 | 2 | 12 | 8 | 18 | 29 | −11 | 16 | Clasifica a Liguilla Descenso Norte |
| 12 | General Velásquez | 22 | 1 | 11 | 10 | 19 | 35 | −16 | 13 | Clasifica a Liguilla Descenso Norte |

Source: globalsportsarchive.com

=== South Zone ===
| Pos | Team | Pld | W | D | L | GF | GA | GD | Pts | Qualification |
|---|---|---|---|---|---|---|---|---|---|---|
| 1 | Provincial Osorno | 22 | 13 | 5 | 4 | 40 | 17 | +23 | 31 | Clasifica a Liguilla Ascenso Sur |
| 2 | Rangers | 22 | 10 | 9 | 3 | 34 | 21 | +13 | 29 | Clasifica a Liguilla Ascenso Sur |
| 3 | Deportes Temuco | 22 | 10 | 5 | 7 | 33 | 26 | +7 | 25 | Clasifica a Liguilla Ascenso Sur |
| 4 | Lota Schwager | 22 | 7 | 8 | 7 | 26 | 22 | +4 | 22 | Clasifica a Liguilla Ascenso Sur |
| 5 | Ñublense | 22 | 7 | 8 | 7 | 23 | 22 | +1 | 22 | Clasifica a Liguilla Ascenso Sur |
| 6 | Deportes Colchagua | 22 | 9 | 3 | 10 | 26 | 28 | −2 | 21 | Clasifica a Liguilla Ascenso Sur |
| 7 | Iberia | 22 | 6 | 8 | 8 | 19 | 23 | −4 | 20 | Clasifica a Liguilla Descenso Sur |
| 8 | Deportes Valdivia | 22 | 6 | 8 | 8 | 28 | 34 | −6 | 20 | Clasifica a Liguilla Descenso Sur |
| 9 | Curicó Unido | 22 | 5 | 9 | 8 | 26 | 31 | −5 | 19 | Clasifica a Liguilla Descenso Sur |
| 10 | Lozapenco | 22 | 8 | 5 | 9 | 29 | 33 | −4 | 18 (Note: Se le restaron tres puntos a Lozapenco por irregularidades financieras) | Clasifica a Liguilla Descenso Sur |
| 11 | Deportes Puerto Montt | 22 | 6 | 6 | 10 | 20 | 26 | −6 | 18 | Clasifica a Liguilla Descenso Sur |
| 12 | Deportes Linares | 22 | 5 | 6 | 11 | 12 | 33 | −21 | 16 | Clasifica a Liguilla Descenso Sur |

Source: globalsportsarchive.com

== Second phase ==
=== North Zone - Promotion playoffs ===
| Pos | Team | Pld | W | D | L | GF | GA | GD | BP | Pts | Promotion or qualification |
|---|---|---|---|---|---|---|---|---|---|---|---|
| 1 | Coquimbo Unido | 10 | 6 | 2 | 2 | 16 | 12 | +4 | 29 | 43 | Promoted to 1991 Primera División de Chile |
| 2 | Deportes Antofagasta | 10 | 4 | 3 | 3 | 16 | 15 | +1 | 29 | 40 | Qualified to Promotion Playoffs |
| 3 | Audax Italiano | 10 | 5 | 1 | 4 | 15 | 10 | +5 | 27 | 38 | |
| 4 | Regional Atacama | 10 | 6 | 1 | 3 | 20 | 15 | +5 | 24 | 37 | |
| 5 | Unión San Felipe | 10 | 2 | 2 | 6 | 15 | 21 | −6 | 24 | 30 | |
| 6 | Magallanes | 10 | 1 | 3 | 6 | 6 | 15 | −9 | 22 | 27 | |

Source: globalsportsarchive.com

=== North Zone - Relegation Playoffs ===
| Pos | Team | Pld | W | D | L | GF | GA | GD | BP | Pts | Qualification or relegation |
|---|---|---|---|---|---|---|---|---|---|---|---|
| 7 | Soinca Bata Melipilla | 10 | 4 | 3 | 3 | 13 | 10 | +3 | 21 | 32 | |
| 8 | Cobreandino | 10 | 3 | 5 | 2 | 15 | 14 | +1 | 21 | 32 | |
| 9 | Deportes Ovalle | 10 | 3 | 3 | 4 | 12 | 12 | 0 | 22 | 31 | |
| 10 | Deportes Arica | 10 | 3 | 4 | 3 | 17 | 15 | +2 | 19 | 29 | To Relegation playoffs |
| 11 | San Luis de Quillota | 10 | 3 | 6 | 1 | 9 | 9 | 0 | 16 | 28 | Relegated to 1991 Tercera División de Chile |
| 12 | General Velásquez | 10 | 2 | 3 | 5 | 6 | 12 | −6 | 13 | 20 | Relegated to 1991 Tercera División de Chile |

Source: globalsportsarchive.com

=== South Zone - Promotion Playoffs ===
| Pos | Team | Pld | W | D | L | GF | GA | GD | BP | Pts | Promotion or qualification |
|---|---|---|---|---|---|---|---|---|---|---|---|
| 1 | Provincial Osorno | 10 | 7 | 2 | 1 | 14 | 4 | +10 | 31 | 47 | Promoted to 1991 Primera División de Chile |
| 2 | Rangers | 10 | 5 | 2 | 3 | 14 | 10 | +4 | 29 | 41 | Qualified to Promotion Playoffs |
| 3 | Deportes Colchagua | 10 | 6 | 3 | 1 | 16 | 9 | +7 | 21 | 36 | |
| 4 | Deportes Temuco | 10 | 2 | 4 | 4 | 10 | 13 | −3 | 25 | 33 | |
| 5 | Ñublense | 10 | 2 | 2 | 6 | 10 | 17 | −7 | 22 | 28 | |
| 6 | Lota Schwager | 10 | 1 | 1 | 8 | 7 | 18 | −11 | 23 | 26 | |

Source: globalsportsarchive.com

=== South Zone - Relegation Playoffs ===
| Pos | Team | Pld | W | D | L | GF | GA | GD | BP | Pts | Qualification or relegation |
|---|---|---|---|---|---|---|---|---|---|---|---|
| 7 | Lozapenco | 10 | 7 | 0 | 3 | 22 | 15 | +7 | 18 | 32 | |
| 8 | Deportes Puerto Montt | 10 | 4 | 3 | 3 | 12 | 10 | +2 | 19 | 30 | |
| 9 | Iberia | 10 | 4 | 2 | 4 | 12 | 12 | 0 | 20 | 30 | |
| 10 | Deportes Linares | 10 | 5 | 1 | 4 | 19 | 17 | +2 | 16 | 27 | To Relegation playoffs |
| 11 | Curicó Unido | 10 | 4 | 2 | 4 | 15 | 14 | +1 | 17 | 27 | Relegated to 1991 Tercera División de Chile |
| 12 | Deportes Valdivia | 10 | 2 | 0 | 8 | 12 | 24 | −12 | 20 | 24 | Relegated to 1991 Tercera División de Chile |

Source: globalsportsarchive.com

== See also ==
- Chilean football league system
