= Francisco Sepúlveda (footballer) =

Chilean footballer (born 1991)

Personal information
- Full name: Francisco Javier Sepulveda Riveros
- Date of birth: 3 September 1991 (age 35)
- Place of birth: Antofagasta, Chile
- Height: 1.80 m (5 ft 11 in)
- Position: Defender

Team information
- Current team: General Velásquez

Youth career
- Deportes Antofagasta

Senior career*
| Years | Team | Apps | (Gls) |
| 2011–2020 | Deportes Antofagasta | 78 | (2) |
| 2016–2017 | → Deportes Copiapó (loan) | 2 | (0) |
| 2017 | → Colchagua (loan) | 13 | (1) |
| 2020–2022 | Rangers | 49 | (0) |
| 2023 | General Velásquez | 10 | (0) |
| 2023–2024 | Deportes Recoleta | 11 | (0) |
| 2025 | Santiago City | 3 | (0) |
| 2025 | Deportes Rengo | 10 | (0) |
| 2026– | General Velásquez | 0 | (0) |
- * Club domestic league appearances and goals as of 13 March 2026

Francisco Javier Sepúlveda Riveros (born 3 September 1991) is a Chilean footballer who plays as defender for General Velásquez.

== Career ==
In the second half of 2023, Sepúlveda signed with Deportes Recoleta from General Velásquez.

He returned to General Velásquez for the 2026 season.
