= Exequiel Márquez =

Argentine footballer

Personal information
- Full name: Jorge Exequiel Márquez
- Date of birth: 18 December 1994 (age 31)
- Place of birth: Quilmes, Argentina
- Height: 1.60 m (5 ft 3 in)
- Position: Winger

Team information
- Current team: Colchagua

Youth career
- 2005–2015: Independiente

Senior career*
| Years | Team | Apps | (Gls) |
| 2015–2016 | Independiente | 0 | (0) |
| 2015 | → Camioneros (loan) | 4 | (0) |
| 2016 | → Talleres RdE (loan) | | |
| 2017 | Las Palmas | 6 | (0) |
| 2018 | Atlético Tembetary | | |
| 2019 | Venados | 2 | (0) |
| 2019 | General Díaz | | |
| 2021 | Talleres RdE | 16 | (1) |
| 2022 | Trasandino | 0 | (0) |
| 2022 | → Barnechea (loan) | 12 | (2) |
| 2023 | San Marcos | 14 | (0) |
| 2024 | Deportes Puerto Montt | 12 | (1) |
| 2025 | Atlético Rafaela | 15 | (1) |
| 2026– | Colchagua | 0 | (0) |
- * Club domestic league appearances and goals as of 27 July 2026

Jorge Exequiel Márquez (born 18 December 1994), known as Exequiel Márquez, is an Argentine footballer who plays as a winger for Chilean club Colchagua.

== Career ==
Born in Quilmes, Argentina, Márquez is a product of Independiente and was loaned out to Camioneros in 2015 and Talleres de Remedios de Escalada in 2016.

In 2017, Márquez played for Las Palmas. The next year, he moved abroad and spent seasons with Mexican club Venados and the Paraguayan clubs Atlético Tembetary and General Díaz. In 2021, he also played for Talleres de Remedios de Escalada.

From 2022 to 2023, Márquez played in Chile for Trasandino, Barnechea, San Marcos de Arica and Deportes Puerto Montt.

Back to Argentina, Márquez joined Atlético de Rafaela in May 2025. The next year, he returned to Chile with Colchagua.

== Personal life ==
Márquez grew up in Villa Los Eucaliptos, Quilmes, just like Sergio Agüero.
