= Bayron Saavedra =

Chilean footballer (born 1997)

Personal information
- Full name: Bayron Antonio Saavedra Navarro
- Date of birth: July 6, 1997 (age 29)
- Place of birth: Santiago, Chile
- Height: 1.78 m (5 ft 10 in)
- Position: Left-back

Team information
- Current team: Deportes Rengo
- Number: 16

Youth career
- Monseñor Enrique Alvear
- Palestino

Senior career*
| Years | Team | Apps | (Gls) |
| 2014–2018 | Palestino | 21 | (0) |
| 2019 | Barnechea | 10 | (0) |
| 2020–2021 | Coquimbo Unido | 0 | (0) |
| 2022 | Rodelindo Román | 7 | (2) |
| 2023 | Deportes Linares | 13 | (1) |
| 2025 | Potiguar | 6 | (1) |
| 2026– | Deportes Rengo | 0 | (0) |

International career
| 2015 | Chile U20 | | |
- * Club domestic league appearances and goals as of 12 March 2025

Bayron Antonio Saavedra Navarro (born July 6, 1997) is a Chilean footballer who plays as a left-back for Deportes Rengo.

== Club career ==
As a youth player, Saavedra was with club Monseñor Enrique Alvear before joining Palestino. He made his professional debut with Palestino in a 2014–15 Copa Chile match against Universidad de Concepción on May 29, 2014.

After playing for Palestino and Barnechea, in the 2020 season he joined Coquimbo Unido, playing at the 2020 Copa Sudamericana.

In 2022, he played for Chilean Segunda División club Rodelindo Román. The next season, he played for Deportes Linares in the same division.

After a year as a free agent, Saavedra signed with Brazilian Série D club Potiguar for the 2025 season alongside his compatriot Óscar Aravena. In March 2025, they returned to his homeland.

== International career ==
Along with Chile U20, he won the L'Alcúdia Tournament in 2015.

== Honours ==
Palestino

- Copa Chile (1): 2018

Coquimbo Unido

- Primera B (1): 2021

Chile U20

- L'Alcúdia International Tournament (1): 2015
