= Juan Carreño (Chilean footballer) =

Chilean footballer (born 1968)

Personal information
- Full name: Juan Enrique Carreño López
- Date of birth: November 16, 1968 (age 57)
- Place of birth: San Fernando, Chile
- Height: 1.85 m (6 ft 1 in)
- Position: Forward

Youth career
- Colo-Colo

Senior career*
Years	Team	Apps	(Gls)
1987–1989	Colo-Colo	3	(0)
1987	→ Unión San Felipe (loan)		
1987	→ Deportes Linares (loan)		
1988	→ Colchagua (loan)		
1989	→ Ñublense (loan)		
1990	Naval		
1991	Cobresal		
1991	Coquimbo Unido		
1992–1993	Everton		
1994	Unión Española	8	(5)
1994	UNAM		
1995	Cobreloa	1	(1)
1996–1997	Deportes Concepción	24	(9)
1998	Huachipato		
1999	Deportes Iquique		
1999	Everton		
2000	Santiago Morning		
2003	Deportes Concepción		

International career
1987	Chile U20	2	(0)
1993–1998	Chile	10	(1)

Managerial career
- 2009–2011: Colchagua
- 2013: General Velásquez
- 2015: General Velásquez
- * Club domestic league appearances and goals

Juan Enrique Carreño López (born September 16, 1968) is a Chilean former football player and manager. A forward, he was nicknamed Candonga.

== Club career ==
A product of Colo-Colo youth system, Carreño played mostly of his career in Chilean clubs, but in 1994 he had short spell in Mexican team Pumas de la UNAM. He was known for his hard temper, which was noted in a match between Huachipato and Provincial Osorno in September 1998, where he punched the rival goalkeeper Hernán Caputto.

== International career ==
Carreño was part of the Chile national under-20 football team that finished fourth in the 1987 FIFA World Youth Championship, played in Chile.

For the adult team, Carreño made 10 appearances between 1993 and 1998. Carreño scored a goal against Bolivia in the 1998 World Cup qualifiers that qualified Chile for the 1998 World Cup. However, he was not selected for the final squad that went to France.

== Coaching career ==
From 2009 to 2011, Carreño was the head coach of Colchagua in the Chilean Tercera A. In 2012 he assumed as the coach of General Velásquez and returned to the club in 2015, when he had to leave the charge because of health issues.

In January 2025, Carreño assumed as head of the sports corporation of San Vicente de Tagua Tagua city council.

== Personal life ==
Carreño is well-known by his nickname Candonga, due to his liking for parties and nocturnal life.
