= Matías Navarrete =

Chilean footballer

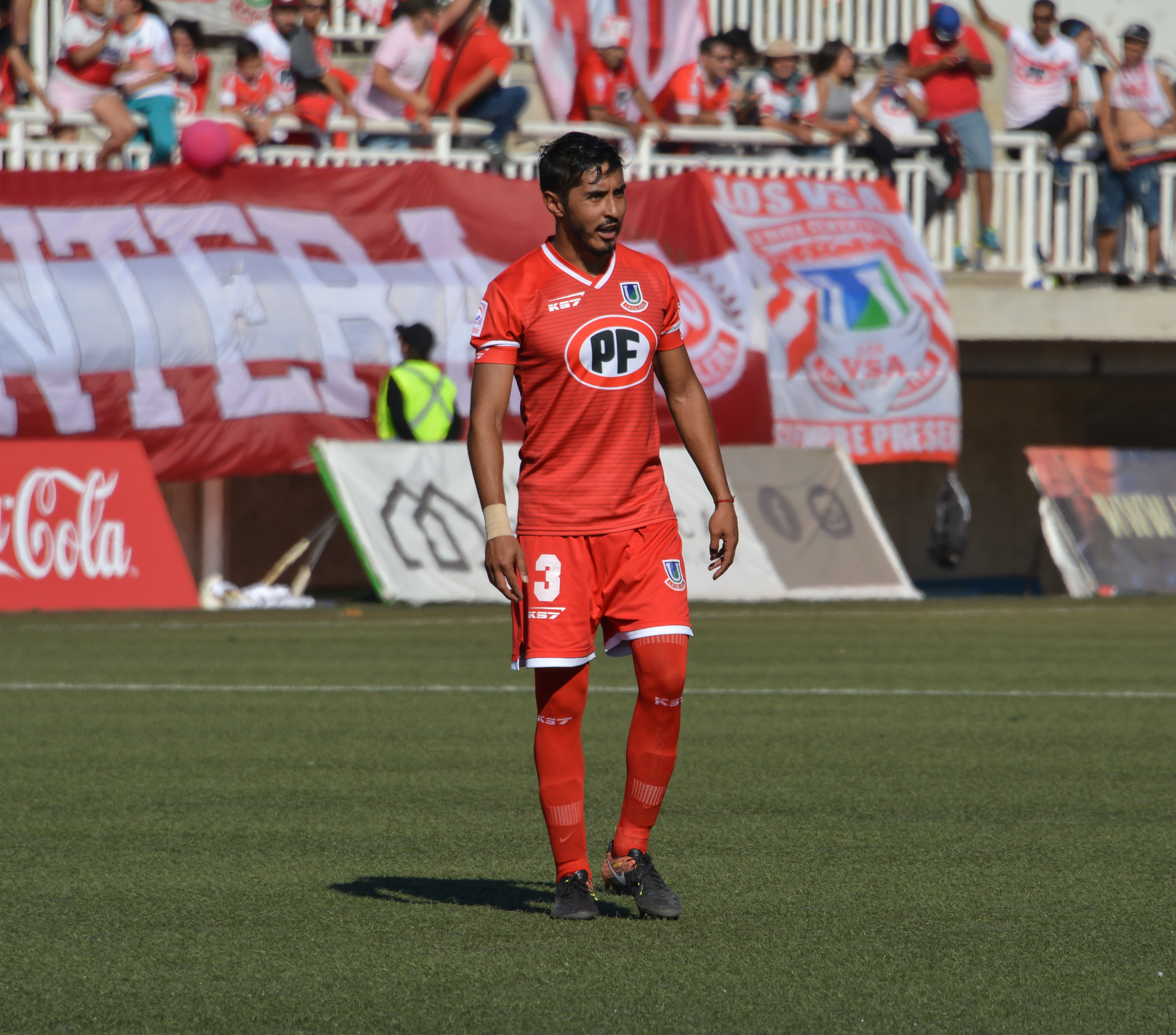
- Navarrete with Unión La Calera in 2018.

Personal information
- Full name: Matías Cristóbal Navarrete Fuentes
- Date of birth: 20 January 1992 (age 34)
- Place of birth: Santiago, Chile
- Height: 1.77 m (5 ft 10 in)
- Position: Centre-back

Team information
- Current team: Deportes Rengo
- Number: 3

Youth career
- 1999–2011: Unión Española

Senior career*
Years	Team	Apps	(Gls)
2011–2015	Unión Española	65	(0)
2012	Unión Española B	6	(2)
2015	→ San Luis (loan)	15	(0)
2016–2017	Deportes Temuco	13	(1)
2017–2021	Unión La Calera	66	(1)
2022	Santiago Morning	21	(0)
2023	Deportes La Serena	4	(0)
2024	Deportes Rengo	26	(0)
2025	Concón National	4	(0)
2026–	Deportes Rengo	0	(0)

International career
2009	Chile U17	4	(0)
- * Club domestic league appearances and goals as of 31 December 2025

Matías Cristóbal Navarrete Fuentes (born 20 January 1992) is a Chilean footballer who plays as a centre-back for Deportes Rengo.

== Career ==
Navarrete joined the Unión Española youth ranks at the age of 9 and made his professional debut in 2011. During 2012, he also made appearances for the B-team in the Segunda División Profesional. With them, he won the 2013 Torneo Transición and the 2013 Supercopa de Chile and left them at the end of 2015. In the first half of 2015, he played on loan for San Luis de Quillota and won the 2014–15 Primera B.

After a stint as a free agent, Navarrete signed with Deportes Temuco in June 2016. A year later, he switched to Unión La Calera, winning the 2017 Primera B.

After leaving Unión La Calera in 2021, Navarrete played for Santiago Morning (2022), Deportes La Serena (2023), Deportes Rengo (2024) and Concón National (2025), suffering an Achilles tendon rupture.

In 2026, Navarrete rejoined Deportes Rengo.

== International career ==
Navarrete represented Chile at under-17 level in the 2009 South American Championship.
