= Bernardo Bello =

Chilean footballer (1933–2018)

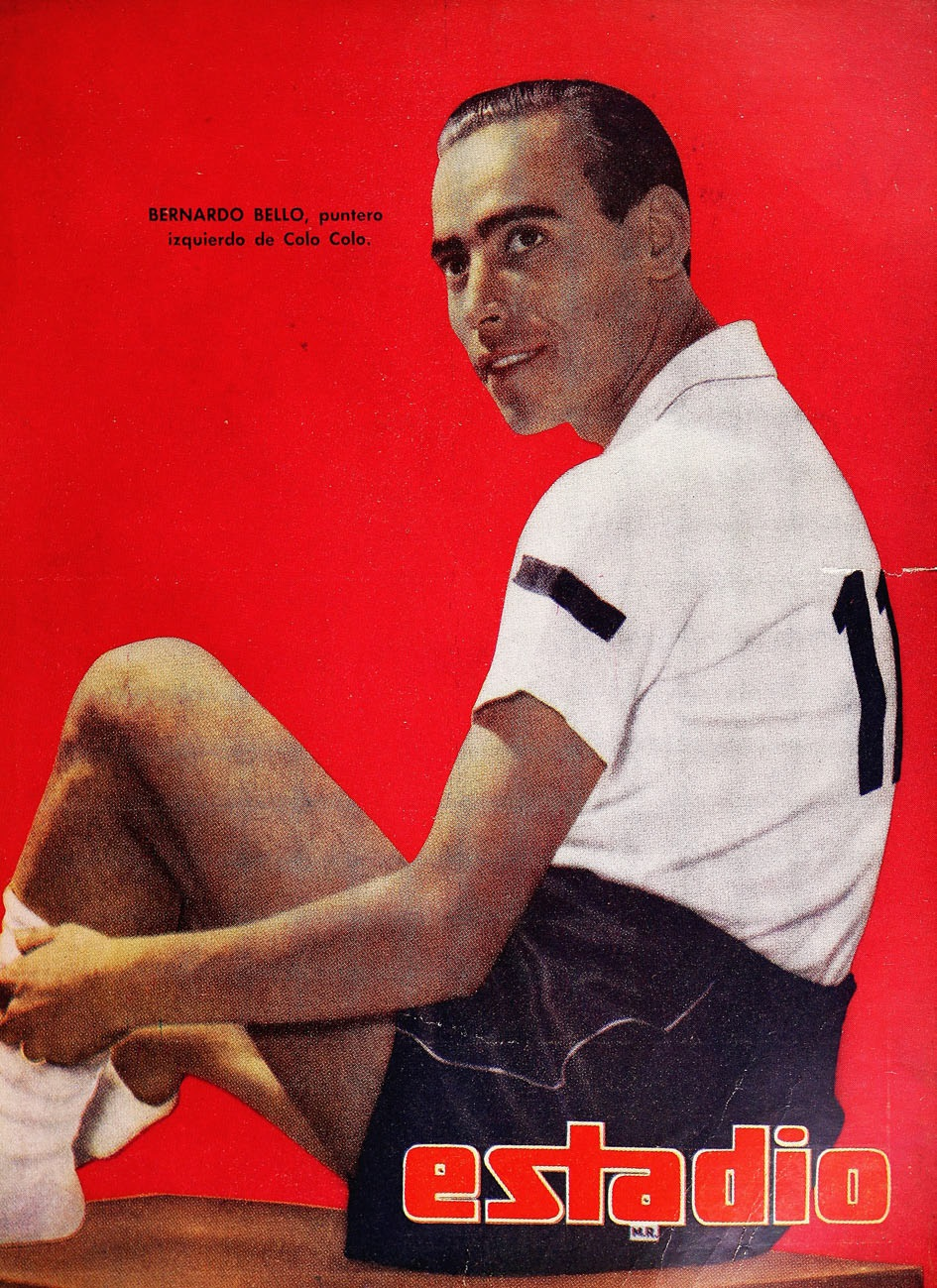

Personal information
- Full name: Bernardo Francisco Bello Gutiérrez
- Date of birth: December 8, 1933
- Place of birth: Quillota, Chile
- Date of death: September 14, 2018 (aged 84)
- Place of death: Santiago, Chile
- Position: Forward

Senior career*
Years	Team	Apps	(Gls)
1953–1964	Colo-Colo		
1965	Magallanes	12	(1)

International career
1954–1963	Chile	10	(2)

Managerial career
- Colo-Colo (youth)
- 1973: San Antonio Unido
- 1985–1986: Chile U16
- 1988: Colchagua
- 1991: Chile (women)
- 2003: Palestine (assistant)
- * Club domestic league appearances and goals

Bernardo Francisco Bello Gutiérrez (Note: In this Spanish name, the first or paternal surname is Bello and the second or maternal family name is Gutiérrez.) (December 8, 1933 – September 14, 2018) was a Chilean footballer who played as a forward.

== Coaching career ==
Bello started his career with the Colo-Colo youth ranks. He led Chile at under-16 level in both the 1985 and the 1986 South American Championship.

Bello was the first manager of the Chile women's national team in 1991.

During 2003, Bello served as assistant coach of Nicola Hadwa and head of training area for the Palestine national team in Gaza.

== Titles ==
- Colo-Colo 1953, 1956, 1960 and 1963 (Chilean Primera División Championship), 1958 (Copa Chile)
