= Néstor Zanatta =

Argentine footballer

Personal information
- Full name: Néstor Fabián Zanatta
- Date of birth: 25 November 1973 (age 52)
- Place of birth: Resistencia, Argentina
- Height: 1.80 m (5 ft 11 in)
- Position: Midfielder

Senior career*
Years	Team	Apps	(Gls)
1990–1992	Central Argentino	–	(–)
1993	Newell's Old Boys		
1994	Deportivo Mandiyú		
1995–1997	Chaco For Ever	13	(0)
1997	Gimnasia y Tiro	9	(0)
1998	Deportes Concepción	23	(3)
1999	Fernández Vial		(12)
2000	Deportivo Italchacao		
2001	Aucas	14	(3)
2001–2002	Fernández Vial		(14)
2003	Rangers	14	(1)
2003–2004	Unión La Calera		
2005–2007	Ñublense	68	(19)
2008–2009	Lota Schwager	37	(5)

Managerial career
- 2010–2011: Ñublense (assistant)
- 2016: Buenos Aires
- 2017: Colchagua
- 2019: Buenos Aires
- 2023: Buenos Aires
- * Club domestic league appearances and goals

Néstor Fabián Zanatta (born 25 November 1973) is a former Argentine footballer who played as a midfielder.

== Club career ==
Zanatta played for clubs in Argentina, Chile, Ecuador and Venezuela.

In Chile, he played for Deportes Concepción, Fernández Vial, Rangers, Unión La Calera, Ñublense and Lota Schwager.

== Coaching career ==
Zanatta served as assistant coach of Luis Marcoleta in Ñublense.

In 2014, he led Sarmiento de Resistencia in the Torneo Federal A. In 2016, he coached Buenos Aires from Parral in the Chilean fifth division. In June 2017, he assumed as manager of Colchagua in the Segunda División.

He returned to Buenoa Aires in 2019 and 2023.
