= Alfredo Ábalos =

Argentine footballer (born 1986)

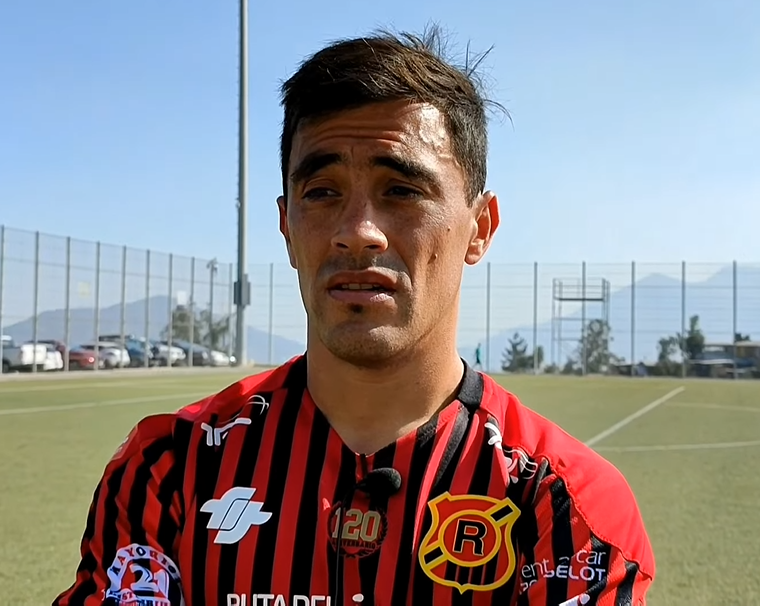
- Ábalos with Rangers in 2022

Personal information
- Full name: Alfredo Omar Ábalos
- Date of birth: 17 March 1986 (age 40)
- Place of birth: General Las Heras, Argentina
- Height: 1.65 m (5 ft 5 in)
- Position: Midfielder

Team information
- Current team: San Marcos
- Number: 20

Senior career*
Years	Team	Apps	(Gls)
2008–2009	Santamarina	34	(2)
2009–2011	Acassuso	63	(7)
2011–2012	Platense	36	(3)
2012–2013	Nueva Chicago	18	(1)
2013–2014	Acassuso	33	(3)
2014–2015	Barracas Central	59	(11)
2016–2017	Curicó Unido	52	(14)
2018–2019	Deportes Temuco	49	(5)
2020–2024	Rangers	142	(42)
2025–	San Marcos	8	(3)
- * Club domestic league appearances and goals as of 17 May 2025

Alfredo Omar Ábalos (born 17 March 1986) is an Argentine professional footballer who plays as a midfielder for Chilean club San Marcos de Arica.

== Career ==
In 2016, Ábalos moved to Chile and signed with Curicó Unido.

In 2025, Ábalos joined San Marcos de Arica after spending five years with Rangers de Talca.

== Career statistics ==
As of match played on 16 March 2018

Appearances and goals by club, season and competition
Club	Season	League			National cup		League cup		Other		Total	
Club	Season	Division	Apps	Goals	Apps	Goals	Apps	Goals	Apps	Goals	Apps	Goals
Deportivo Santamarina	2008–09	Torneo Argentino A		2	0	0	—		—			2
Acassuso	2010–11	Primera B Metropolitana		7	0	0	—		—			7
Platense	2011–12	Primera B Metropolitana		3	0	0	—		—			3
Nueva Chicago	2012–13	Primera B Nacional	18	1	0	0	—		—		18	1
Acassuso	2013–14	Primera B Metropolitana	33	3	3	1	—		—		36	4
Barracas Central	2014	Primera B Metropolitana	21	2	0	0	—		—		21	2
Barracas Central	2015	Primera B Metropolitana	37	9	1	1	—		—		38	10
Barracas Central	Total		58	11	1	1	0	0	0	0	59	12
Curicó Unido	2015–16	Primera B de Chile	16	5	0	0	—		—		16	5
Curicó Unido	2016–17	Primera B de Chile	23	4	1	0	—		—		24	4
Curicó Unido	2017	Chilean Primera División	13	5	5	0	—		—		18	5
Curicó Unido	Total		52	14	6	0	0	0	0	0	58	14
Deportes Temuco	2018	Chilean Primera División	28	5	2	1	0	0	4	1	34	7
Career total			189	46	12	3	0	0	4	1	205	50
