= General Velásquez =

- Full name: Club Deportivo General Velásquez
- Nicknames: Velasquinos; Huasos; The Green
- Founded: 8 January 1908
- Ground: Estadio Municipal de San Vicente de Tagua Tagua Augusto Rodríguez
- Capacity: 3,000
- Chairman: Carlos Cornejo
- Manager: César Bustamante
- League: Segunda División
- 2025: 7th
Home colours	Away colours

General Velásquez is a Chilean football club, their home town is San Vicente de Tagua Tagua, Chile. They currently play in the third level of Chilean football, the Segunda Division.

The club was founded on January 8, 1908, as General Velásquez in honor of José Velásquez Bórquez, a general who participated in the War of the Pacific.

== History ==
The club was founded on 8 January 1908, and its name honors the military officer José Velásquez Bórquez, who participated in the War of the Pacific and died in San Vicente in 1897. He was born in Puchuncaví, Valparaíso Region, where the «Club General Velásquez de Puchuncaví» has existed since 1930.

The club was one of the founding members of the Asociación de San Vicente de Tagua Tagua, competing in that association from 1926 until 1960, when it began participating in the Campeonato Regional Central. In 1973 it suspended its participation in the tournament, returning the following year, and in 1976 it won the competition for the first and only time.

At the beginning of the 1980s, the club entered professional football, competing in the newly created Tercera División in 1981. In 1983 it was promoted by the Asociación Central de Fútbol to that year's Segunda División tournament, along with Quintero Unido, Deportes Victoria, Unión Santa Cruz and Curicó Unido, after meeting requirements such as adequate infrastructure and strong match attendance. However, in the following season the club finished last in the Zona Norte table and was relegated to Tercera División.

In the 1986 Tercera División Championship, General Velásquez qualified for the Liguilla de Ascenso, where it was crowned champion and promoted to the Segunda División. After several modest campaigns in the category—most notably a 1–1 draw against Universidad de Chile in 1989— the club finished last in the Liguilla Descenso Norte of the 1990 Championship and was relegated once again, marking its final season in the Segunda División.

In 2008 the club endured its worst campaign in history and was relegated to the Tercera División B, the fourth tier of Chilean football (now the fifth level). In 2012 General Velásquez began a promising campaign under head coach Juan "Candonga" Carreño, a former Chile international in the qualifiers for the France 1998 World Cup. On the final matchday, the team secured qualification to the Second Phase in pursuit of promotion to what is now known as the Tercera División A, after finishing third in the Zona Sur. During the Second Phase (Zona Sur), following the first match against Unión Molina, Carreño resigned due to disagreements with the club’s board and was replaced by Edmundo Apablaza. The team finished third in the final group and therefore had to contest a promotion play-off for the last available spot against Ferroviarios. In the first leg, the “Verde” side won 2–0 at home; however, in the return leg, with the score tied 2–2 on aggregate, the match was suspended due to incidents caused by supporters of both teams. The replay was subsequently held, and General Velásquez won 3–1, securing promotion for the following season.

With Italo Pinochet as head coach, the team completed an outstanding campaign and won the 2017 Tercera A title. They secured the championship by defeating Deportivo Estación Central 4–1 away on the final matchday, finishing top of the table with 60 points. The victory marked their return to professional Chilean football after almost 30 years in the amateur leagues.

== Squad ==
As of 14 August 2026. Note: Flags indicate national team as defined under FIFA eligibility rules; some limited exceptions apply. Players may hold more than one non-FIFA nationality.

No.	Pos.	Nation	Player
1	GK	CHI	Wladimir Núñez
2	MF	CHI	Ian Aguirre
3	DF	CHI	Iván Carrasco
4	DF	CHI	Francisco López
5	DF	CHI	Juan José Vidal
6	MF	CHI	Benjamín Pinto
7	FW	CHI	Jason Lorca
8	MF	CHI	Jorge Pavez
9	FW	CHI	Leandro Vargas
10	MF	CHI	Byron Bustamante
11	FW	CHI	Juan Pablo Lorca
12	GK	CHI	Jean Cerda (loan from Cobresal)
13	FW	CHI	Mateo González
14	MF	CHI	Cristián Pizarro
15	MF	CHI	Luis Torres
16	DF	CHI	Francisco Sepúlveda

No.	Pos.	Nation	Player
17	FW	CHI	Martín Alfaro
18	MF	CHI	Jorge Muza
19	DF	CHI	Vicente Orrego
20	MF	CHI	Rodrigo Riquelme
21	MF	CHI	Matías Villablanca
22	GK	CHI	Felipe Abarca (c)
23	FW	CHI	Matías Silva
24	DF	CHI	Juan Abarca
25	MF	CHI	Jesús Monjes
26	FW	CHI	Cristóbal Arriaza
27	DF	CHI	Francisco Zamorano
28	MF	CHI	Benjamín Rivera
29	MF	CHI	Enzo Riquelme
30	FW	COL	Jhon Alegría
31	FW	CHI	Diego Chávez

== Managers ==
- (Chile) Alejandro Sabag (1961–1962)
- (Chile) Sergio Soto (1963–1964)
- (Chile) Sergio Soto (1969–1972)
- (Chile) Gustavo Velásquez (1983–1984)
- (Chile) Constantino Mohor (1985–1988)
- (Chile) Ricardo Horta (1989)
- (Chile) Eduardo Pérez (1989–1990)
- (Chile) José Rivas (1990)
- (Chile) John Greig (1990–1994)
- (Chile) René Gatica (1996–1997)
- (Chile) Martín Fierro (1998–2000)
- (Chile) Bernardo Pavez (2007)
- (Chile) Marcelo Jara (2009–2010)
- (Chile) Bernardo Pavez (2010–2011)
- (Chile) Juan Carreño (2012)
- (Chile) Edmundo Apablaza (2012–2013)
- (Chile) Manuel Guajardo (2014)
- (Chile) César Bustamanate (2014)
- (Chile) Luis Abarca (2015)
- (Uruguay) Silvio Fernández (2015)
- (Chile) Juan Carreño (2015)
- (Chile) Nelson Soto (2015)
- (Chile) Víctor Fuentes (2015)
- (Chile) Gerardo Astudillo (2016)
- (Chile) Gastón Mitchell (2016)
- (Chile) Lexter Lacroix (2016)
- (Chile) Ítalo Pinochet (2017)
- (Chile) Roberto Rojas (2018)
- (Chile) Elvis Aliaga (2019)
- (Chile) César Bustamante (2019–2020)
- (Chile) Mauricio Riffo (2020–2021)
- (Chile) César Bustamante (2021–2022)
- (Chile) René Gatica (2022)
- (Chile) Raúl González (2023)
- (Chile) Gerardo Silva (2023)
- (Chile) César Bustamante (2024)
- (Chile) Matías Garrido (2025)
- (Chile) César Bustamante (2026)
- (Chile) Matías Garrido (2026–Present)

== Honours ==
- Tercera División de Chile (2): 1986, 2017
- Campeonato Regional Zona Central (1): 1976
