= David Franco (footballer) =

Mexican-Argentine footballer

Personal information
- Full name: David Franco Pola
- Date of birth: 8 March 1997 (age 29)
- Place of birth: Guadalajara, Mexico
- Height: 1.77 m (5 ft 10 in)
- Position: Midfielder

Team information
- Current team: Colchagua
- Number: 15

Youth career
- –2016: Banfield

Senior career*
Years	Team	Apps	(Gls)
2016–2017	Morelia Premier		
2018	UNAM B		
2018–2019	Almirante Brown	5	(0)
2020	Newell's Old Boys Salta	–	(–)
2020–2021	Cafetaleros de Chiapas	15	(1)
2021–2022	Cancún		
2022–2024	Argentino Monte Maíz	63	(3)
2025	Sportivo Belgrano	24	(1)
2026–	Colchagua	1	(0)
- * Club domestic league appearances and goals as of 27 July 2026

David Franco Pola (born 8 March 1997) is a Mexican-Argentine footballer who plays as a midfielder for Chilean club Colchagua.

== Career ==
Born in Guadalajara, Mexico, Franco was trained at Argentine club Banfield until the age of 19 and returned to his country of birth with Morelia and Pumas UNAM in the Liga Premier de México.

In 2018, Franco returned to Argentina to play for Almirante Brown and Newell's Old Boys from Salta.

Back to Mexico in 2020, Franco spent seasons with Cafetaleros de Chiapas and Cancún FC. He moved back to Argentina in 2022 and played for Argentino de Monte Maíz and Sportivo Belgrano.

In the second half of 2026, Franco moved to Chile and signed with Colchagua.

== Personal life ==
David is the son of former Argentina international footballer Darío Franco and the younger brother of the Spanish-born footballer Emiliano Franco. He holds Argentine nationality.
