= Deportes Rengo =

- Full name: Club de Deportes Rengo
- Founded: March 18, 1984
- Ground: Estadio Guillermo Díaz Guzmán; Rengo, Chile
- Capacity: 3 000 spectators
- Coach: (Argentina) Martín Garnero
- League: Segunda División Profesional de Chile
- 2024: 4th
Home colours	Away colours

Club de Deportes Rengo is a Chilean professional football club based in the city of Rengo, O'Higgins Region. It was founded on March 18, 1984, and currently plays in the Segunda División Profesional de Chile.

It plays its home games at the Guillermo Guzmán Díaz Municipal Stadium, a venue inaugurated in the 1960s with a capacity for 3,000 spectators.

== History ==
Club Deportes Rengo was founded on March 18, 1984, under the auspices of the Rengo Football Association (ASOFUR) and belonging to the federated records of the Asociación Nacional de Fútbol Amateur (ANFA) in order to unify the local clubs in a single representative of the commune in the National Tournament of the Third Division of ANFA. For this reason, it adopted the name of Deportes Rengo, as well as the colors of the Association and Selection of the commune.

In the 80s, the club had the support of local collaborators, mainly industries established in the commune, such as Viamaxi, Temsa and the international Bticino, which had its factory in the city. In that decade, Deportes Rengo was an active participant in the division and for several years was a candidate for different promotions.

The club was a breeding ground for great players in the area, being the basis of the communal teams that won the national amateur championships three times in 1986 in Valdivia, 1989 in Curicó, and 1996 in the proper city of Rengo.

After those years, and with the gradual closure of the factories that mainly supported the institution, the club was left without the necessary economic support, which condemned it to relegation to the local federation of origin in 1997. Thus, it continued for several years, competing in local federation tournaments, and regional champions cup, with youth and adult series.

=== Profesional era ===
In 2022, Rengo achieved its promotion to the professional football after defeating Deportes Colina in the definition match for the promotion to the Segunda División Profesional (Chilean third-tier).

In 2023, the team played the Copa Chile.

In 2024, the club finished fourth in the Segunda Profesional, where it had the experience of professional players like Sebastián Pol.

== Players ==
=== Current squad ===
As of 16 August 2026. Note: Flags indicate national team as defined under FIFA eligibility rules; some limited exceptions apply. Players may hold more than one non-FIFA nationality.

No.	Pos.	Nation	Player
1	GK	ARG	Federico Molina
2	DF	CHI	Martín García
3	DF	CHI	Matías Navarrete (c)
4	DF	CHI	Javier Herrera
5	DF	CHI	José Basualto
6	MF	CHI	Nicolás Basaure
7	FW	CHI	Benjamín Campos
8	DF	CHI	Michel Quezada
9	FW	CHI	Lucas Fierro
10	MF	CHI	Matías Recabal
11	FW	CHI	Zederick Vega
12	GK	CHI	Cristóbal Lecaros
13	MF	CHI	Vicente Quevedo

No.	Pos.	Nation	Player
14	FW	CHI	Francisco Rivera (loan from Colo-Colo)
15	FW	CHI	Enzo Sepúlveda
16	DF	CHI	Bayron Saavedra
18	MF	CHI	Jeckar Amaya
19	FW	CHI	Joshua Arrué
20	MF	CHI	Mathew González
21	DF	CHI	Joaquín López
22	MF	CHI	Benjamín Ramírez
23	MF	CHI	Juan Pablo Carrasco
24	FW	CHI	Matías Meneses
29	MF	CHI	Maykol Umaña
—	DF	CHI	Kevin Serrano
—	FW	CHI	David Salazar

== Managers ==
- (Chile) Gerardo Silva (1992–1994)
- (Chile) Gerardo Silva (2010)
- (Chile) John Greig (2011)
- (Chile) Marcos Cari (2012)
- (Chile) César Bustamante (2013)
- (Chile) Pascual de Gregorio (2014)
- (Chile) Mauricio Benavides (2014)
- (Chile) Fred Gayoso (2015)
- (Chile) Jaime Nova (2015)
- (Chile) Luis Rojas (2015)
- (Chile) Luis Medina (2015)
- (Chile) Gerardo Silva (2016)
- (Chile) Hermes Navarro (2016)
- (Chile) Víctor Cancino (2017)
- (Chile) Fred Gayoso (2017–2018)
- (Chile) Luis Rojas (2018)
- (Chile) Mauricio Benavides (2018)
- (Chile) Gerardo Silva (2019)
- (Chile) Fred Gayoso (2020–2021)
- (Chile) Boris Leiva (2022)
- (Chile) Matías Garrido (2022–2023)
- (Chile) Jorge Maiben' (2023)
- (Chile) Marcelo Jara (2023)
- (Argentina) Martín Garnero (2024–2025)
- (Chile) Maximiliano López (2025)
- (Chile) Víctor Fuentes (2026–Present)
