= Gerardo Silva (Chilean football manager) =

Chilean football manager

Personal information
- Full name: Gerardo Enrique Silva Díaz
- Date of birth: 11 January 1962 (age 64)
- Place of birth: Rengo, Chile

Team information
- Current team: Santiago Morning (manager)

Managerial career
- Years: Team
- 1985: Atlético Caupolicán
- 1985: Ramón Rodríguez Pando
- 1985: Azucol de Rosario
- 1986: Unión Veterana (assistant)
- 1987–1988: Unión Veterana
- 1988: Peumo (city team)
- 1989: Alianza de Coltauco
- 1990–1991: Guillermo Guzmán
- 1992–1994: Deportes Rengo
- 1995: Rengo (city team)
- 1996: Deportes Rengo
- 1997–1999: Colchagua
- 2000: Constitución Unido
- 2001: Trasandino
- 2002–2004: Deportes Copiapó
- 2005: O'Higgins
- 2006–2009: Colchagua
- 2009: O'Higgins
- 2010: Rengo Unido
- 2010: Rengo Unido (youth)
- 2011: Unión Santa María
- 2012–2013: Deportes Copiapó
- 2013–2014: Deportes Puerto Montt
- 2014: Chimbarongo FC
- 2014–2016: Malleco Unido
- 2016: Deportes Rengo
- 2018: Club Petrolero
- 2018: Deportes Vallenar
- 2019: Deportes Rengo
- 2022: Colchagua
- 2023: General Velásquez
- 2024: Colchagua
- 2026–: Santiago Morning

Gerardo Enrique Silva Díaz (born 11 January 1962) is a Chilean football manager, currently in charge of General Velásquez.

== Career ==
Born in Rengo, Chile, Silva is a former amateur football player and current football manager who began his career in amateur clubs at the second half 1980s. He has coached at all categories of the Chilean football, but he is better known for getting promotion to Chilean Primera División with O'Higgins in the 2005 season and coached them again in the 2009 Clausura of the top level, replacing the Argentine coach Jorge Sampaoli.

At amateur level, he won the Campeonato Nacional de Selecciones in 1996. He also won the Campeonato Nacional de Novatos, a youth championship, with Rengo Unido in 2010.

In addition to O'Higgins, he has led many teams in Chilean football, such as Colchagua, Deportes Rengo (also Rengo Unido), Deportes Copiapó, Deportes Puerto Montt, Malleco Unido, among others. He has won league titles of the Tercera División, getting promotion to the Primera B, with both Colchagua in 1998 and Deportes Copiapó in 2002.

He also got promotion to the 2013 Primera B with Deportes Copiapó in 2012 and to the 2015 Tercera A with Chimbarongo FC.

In 2018, he had a stint in Bolivia with Club Petrolero of the Asociación Tarijeña becoming the runner-up and getting promotion to the Copa Simón Bolívar. After this season, he has been sounded out to led another Bolivian teams such as San José.

In 2022, he assumed as coach of Colchagua.

== Other works ==
In 2006 he assumed the management of amateur football integration for the O'Higgins Region of O'Higgins FC.

As an author, he published an autobiographical book called Bendita Pasión (Blessed Passion) in November 2018.

In 2020, he served as an motivational instructor for the education department of the Municipality of Rengo, with support of psychologists, in the context of COVID-19 pandemic.

Silva works as a columnist for both digital sports media El Ágora and Primera B Chile, where he also performs as a commentator.

== Personal life ==
He is nicknamed Yayo Silva, an affective form of Eduardo.

== Honours ==
Rengo (city team)

- Campeonato Nacional de Selecciones: 1996

Colchagua

- Tercera División: 1998

Deportes Copiapó

- Tercera División: 2002

Rengo Unido (youth)

- Campeonato Nacional Novatos: 2010
