= Matías Meneses =

Chilean footballer (born 1999)

Personal information
- Full name: Matías Francisco Meneses Letelier
- Date of birth: 28 March 1999 (age 27)
- Place of birth: Coltauco, Chile
- Height: 1.74 m (5 ft 9 in)
- Position: Forward

Team information
- Current team: Deportes Rengo
- Number: 24

Youth career
- O'Higgins

Senior career*
Years	Team	Apps	(Gls)
2017–2024	O'Higgins	41	(3)
2019	→ Santiago Morning (loan)	4	(0)
2022	→ San Luis (loan)	22	(1)
2023	→ Deportes Santa Cruz (loan)	5	(0)
2024	Deportes Rengo	8	(2)
2025	Provincial Ovalle	8	(0)
2026–	Deportes Rengo	0	(0)

International career
2019	Chile U20	2	(0)
- * Club domestic league appearances and goals as of 24 March 2026

Matías Francisco Meneses Letelier (born 28 March 1999) is a Chilean football player who plays as forward for Deportes Rengo.
