= Cristóbal Marín =

Chilean footballer (born 1994)

Personal information
- Full name: Cristóbal Osvaldo Marín Barrios
- Date of birth: 3 June 1994 (age 32)
- Place of birth: La Serena, Chile
- Height: 1.66 m (5 ft 5 in)
- Positions: Midfielder; left-back

Team information
- Current team: Colchagua
- Number: 20

Youth career
- Deportes La Serena

Senior career*
Years	Team	Apps	(Gls)
2013–2018	Deportes La Serena	146	(12)
2019–2021	Audax Italiano	23	(0)
2021–2022	Coquimbo Unido	28	(4)
2022–2023	Barnechea	33	(2)
2024–2025	Deportes Recoleta	37	(3)
2026–	Colchagua	0	(0)
- * Club domestic league appearances and goals as of 14 April 2024

Cristóbal Osvaldo Marín Barrios (born 3 June 1994) is a Chilean footballer who plays as a midfielder for Colchagua in the Segunda División Profesional de Chile.

== Career ==
In the second half of 2022, Marín left Coquimbo Unido and joined Barnechea in the Primera B de Chile.

In 2024, Marín signed with Deportes Recoleta.

In February 2026, Marín joined Colchagua in the Segunda División Profesional de Chile.

== Personal life ==
He is nicknamed Chicote.

== Honours ==
Coquimbo Unido

- Primera B (1): 2021
