= Gustavo Guerreño =

Paraguayan footballer

Personal information
- Full name: Gustavo Ariel Guerreño Otazú
- Date of birth: 17 October 1991 (age 35)
- Place of birth: Paraguarí, Paraguay
- Height: 1.80 m (5 ft 11 in)
- Position: Forward

Team information
- Current team: Sportivo Iteño

Youth career
- 15 de Mayo
- Rubio Ñu

Senior career*
Years	Team	Apps	(Gls)
2010–2012	Rubio Ñu	4	(0)
2012	Sportivo Carapeguá	3	(0)
2013	Sportivo Iteño	19	(3)
2013	Olimpia Itá	18	(4)
2014	Sportivo Carapeguá	12	(1)
2014	Sportivo Iteño	15	(5)
2015–2016	Pasaquina	44	(16)
2017–2018	Alianza	72	(27)
2018	Santa Tecla	3	(1)
2018–2021	Deportes Melipilla	72	(15)
2021	Cobreloa	14	(5)
2022	Universidad de Concepción	31	(7)
2023	Mushuc Runa	3	(0)
2023–2024	Deportes Concepción	16	(3)
2024	→ San Marcos (loan)	17	(1)
2025	Cristóbal Colón JAS	–	(–)
2025–	Sportivo Iteño	–	(–)
- * Club domestic league appearances and goals as of 5 January 2026

Gustavo Ariel Guerreño Otazú (born 17 October 1991) is a Paraguayan footballer who plays as a forward for Sportivo Iteño.

== Career ==
Born in Paraguarí, Paraguay, Guerreño was with club 15 de Mayo in his hometown before joining the Rubio Ñu under-20 team. He made his professional debut with them in the 2010 Paraguayan Primera División against Guaraní under Francisco Arce. In 2012, he switched to Sportivo Carapeguá in the same division.

The next two years, Guerreño played for Sportivo Iteño, Olimpia Itá, Sportivo Carapeguá and Sportivo Iteño again.

In 2015, he emigrated to El Salvador and played for Pasaquina, Alianza and Santa Tecla. As a member of Alianza, he won two league titles in 2017 Apertura and 2018 Clausura.

In the second half of 2018, Guerreño moved to Chile and signed with Deportes Melipilla, getting promotion to the Chilean Primera División in the 2020 season. In August 2021, he switched to Cobreloa.

In 2022, he played for Universidad de Concepción.

In 2023, he moved to Ecuador and signed with Serie A side Mushuc Runa. In the second half of the same year, he returned to Chile and joined Deportes Concepción. In May 2024, he moved on loan to San Marcos de Arica to replace Nicolás Gauna due to an Achilles tendon rupture.

== Personal life ==
His younger brother, Carlos, is a professional footballer. Another brother, Rubén, also played football and became a policeman like his father. They all three coincided in Sportivo Carapeguá.
