= Cristian Leiva (Chilean footballer) =

Chilean footballer and manager (born 1976)

Personal information
- Full name: Cristian Rodrigo Leiva Godoy
- Date of birth: 3 March 1976 (age 50)
- Place of birth: Papudo, Chile
- Height: 1.81 m (5 ft 11 in)
- Position: Left-back

Team information
- Current team: Deportes Limache (assistant)

Youth career
- Universidad de Chile

Senior career*
Years	Team	Apps	(Gls)
1996–1998	Universidad de Chile	4	(0)
1998	→ Deportes Iquique (loan)	23	(0)
1999–2000	Deportes La Serena	33	(3)
2001–2003	Unión San Felipe	56	(8)
2003	Unión Española	12	(0)
2004–2006	Coquimbo Unido	101	(5)
2007	Huachipato	22	(0)
2008	Deportes Antofagasta	5	(0)
2008	Unión San Felipe	18	(0)
Total		274	(16)

Managerial career
- 2011–2012: Universidad de Chile (youth)
- 2019–2020: Chile (video analyst)
- 2017–2019: Chile U15
- 2019–2020: Chile U17
- 2019–2020: Chile U23 (assistant)
- 2020–2021: Deportes Iquique
- 2025: Colón (assistant)
- 2026: Atlético Mineiro (assistant)
- 2026–: Deportes Limache (assistant)
- * Club domestic league appearances and goals

Cristian Rodrigo Leiva Godoy (born 3 March 1976) is a Chilean football manager and former footballer who played as a defender. He is the current assistant manager of Víctor Rivero in Deportes Limache.

== Club career ==
Leiva began his professional career with Universidad de Chile, staying only two years at the club. Along with La U, he played the last minutes in a 1996 Copa Libertadores match against Barcelona de Guayaquil at the quarter-finals. After he was on loan to Deportes Iquique, he played for several clubs in Chile, being his greatest achievement to become runner-up of the 2005 Torneo Apertura with Coquimbo Unido, after losing the final against Unión Española.

== Managerial career ==
On 2011, Leiva began his managerial career at the Universidad de Chile youth ranks and Jorge Sampaoli, manager of the first team, gave him in charge of the "sparring team".

From 2012 to 2019 - with the managers Jorge Sampaoli, Juan Antonio Pizzi and Reinaldo Rueda - he worked in the technical staff of Chile national team as a video and report assistant and Chile U15's manager (from 2017 to 2019). At this term, he was known as a "spy" by watching slyly the Chile's opponents. After Hernán Caputto left Chile U17, on 9 July 2019 he was confirmed as the new manager for the 2019 FIFA U-17 World Cup, where Chile U17 reached the second stage. At the same time, he also worked as assistant coach of Bernardo Redín in Chile U23 in both 2019 Maurice Revello Tournament and 2020 Pre-Olympic Tournament.

In 2020, he took his first challenge at the Chilean Primera División by assuming the management of Deportes Iquique.

On 11 December 2024, Leiva joined the technical staff of Ariel Pereyra in Colón as an assistant coach.

After Colón, Leiva made training of coaches in Honduras alongside Reinaldo Rueda. He also has a sports complex in the Valparaíso Region, Chile.

In January 2026, Leiva joined the technical staff of Jorge Sampaoli in Brazilian club Atlético Mineiro. In March of the same year, he switched to Deportes Limache.

== Personal life ==
Leiva is nicknamed Flaco (Skinny).
