= Marcelo Jara =

Chilean footballer

Personal information
- Full name: Marcelo Antonio Jara Valdés
- Date of birth: 13 August 1972 (age 54)
- Place of birth: Santiago, Chile
- Height: 1.73 m (5 ft 8 in)
- Position: Forward

Youth career
- Universidad de Chile

Senior career*
Years	Team	Apps	(Gls)
1990–1997	Universidad de Chile	86	(21)
1996	→ Unión Española (loan)	23	(5)
1998	Deportes Concepción	25	(2)
1999–2001	Coquimbo Unido	66	(10)
2002–2004	Universidad de Concepción	46	(3)
2003	→ Provincial Osorno (loan)		
2005	O'Higgins	6	(0)

International career
1991	Chile U20		
1993	Chile	1	(0)

Managerial career
- 2007–2008: Deportes Melipilla (assistant)
- 2009–2010: General Velásquez
- 2012–2021: Universidad de Chile (youth)
- 2020: Universidad de Chile (interim)
- 2023: Rancagua Sur
- 2023: Deportes Rengo
- * Club domestic league appearances and goals

Marcelo Antonio Jara Valdés (born 13 August 1972) is a Chilean football manager and former player who played as a forward.

== Career ==
A product of Universidad de Chile, Jara made his debut in the 1991 Primera División. With them, he won the Chilean Primera División in 1994 and 1995. In 1996, he was loaned out to Unión Española.

Jara developed his entire career in Chile. He also played for Deportes Concepción, Coquimbo Unido, Universidad de Concepción, Provincial Osorno and O'Higgins.

Jara helped Universidad de Concepción to get promotion to Chilean Primera División by first time in the 2002 Primera B.

Jara also helped his last club, O'Higgins, to get promotion to Chilean top division in 2005.

At international level, Jara represented Chile U20 in the 1991 South American Championship and made one appearance for the senior team in the 2–1 home victory against Bolivia on 31 March 1993.

== Coaching career ==
Jara started his career with Deportes Melipilla and General Velásquez. As a coach for the Universidad de Chile youth ranks, he assumed as interim coach for the first team in 2020.

Following Universidad de Chile, Jara led Rancagua Sur and Deportes Rengo in 2023.
