= Alejandro Delfino =

Argentine-born Chilean footballer (born 1989)

Personal information
- Full name: Alejandro Alfredo Delfino
- Date of birth: 18 September 1989 (age 37)
- Place of birth: Temperley, Argentina
- Height: 1.82 m (5 ft 11 1/2 in)
- Position: Defender

Team information
- Current team: Trasandino
- Number: 30

Senior career*
Years	Team	Apps	(Gls)
2009–2012	Banfield	46	(0)
2013–2019	Deportes Antofagasta	117	(5)
2018	→ Rangers (loan)	15	(0)
2020–2021	Rangers	14	(1)
2022–2023	Deportes Recoleta	42	(1)
2024–	Trasandino	10	(0)
- * Club domestic league appearances and goals as of 1 July 2024

Alejandro Alfredo Delfino (born 18 September 1989) is an Argentine naturalized Chilean footballer who plays as a defender for Trasandino de Los Andes.

== Career ==
In March 2024, Delfino joined Trasandino de Los Andes in the Segunda División Profesional de Chile.

== Honours ==
Banfield

- Argentine Primera División (1): 2009 Apertura
