= Gualberto Jara =

Paraguayan football manager

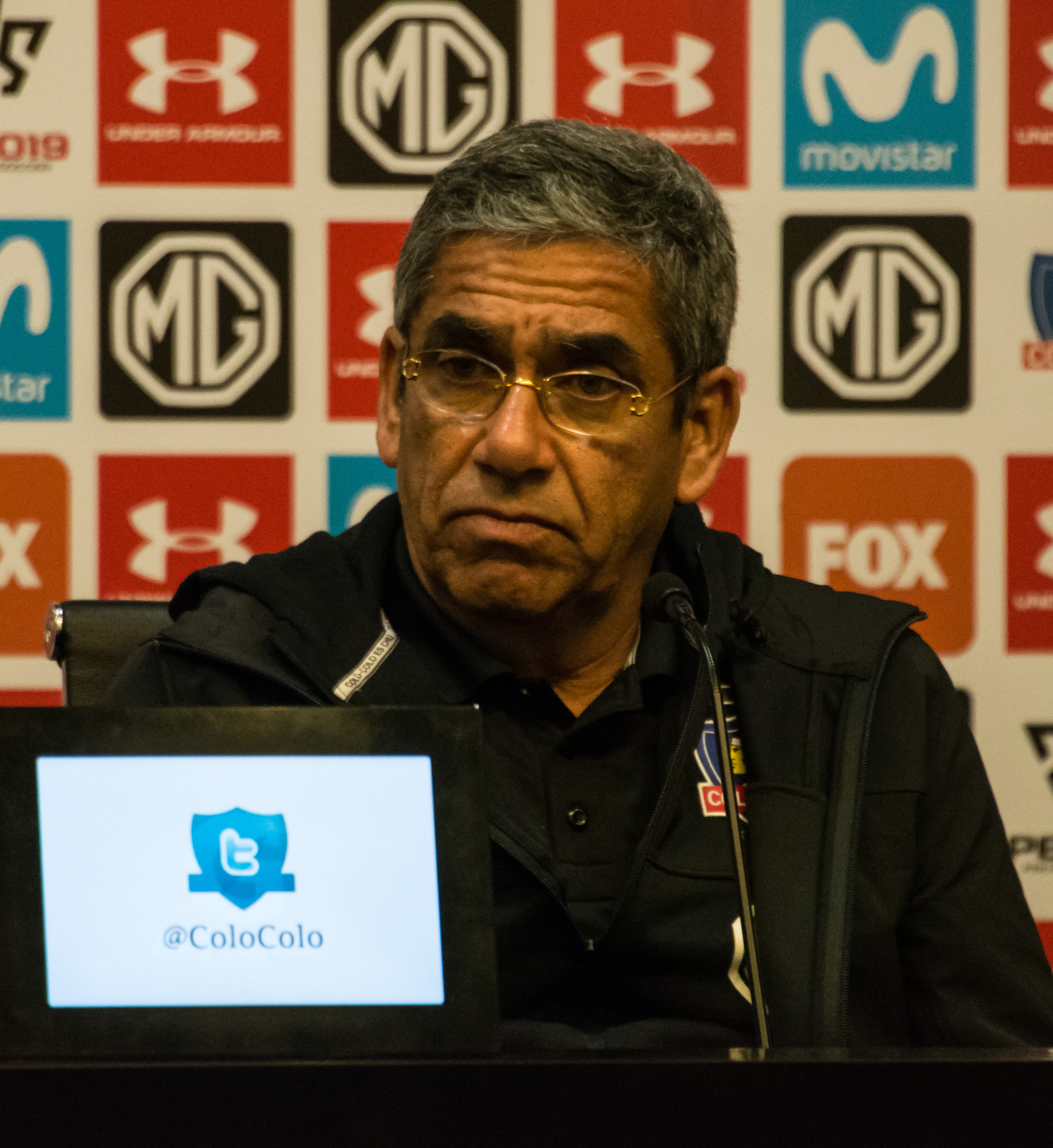

Personal information
- Full name: Gualberto Ramón Jara Vera
- Date of birth: 13 July 1959 (age 67)
- Place of birth: Asunción, Paraguay

Managerial career
- Years: Team
- 1993: Cerro Corá (assistant)
- 1994: Olimpia (assistant)
- 1995–1998: Colo-Colo (assistant)
- 1999–2001: Racing de Santander (assistant)
- 2002: Racing de Santander (assistant)
- 2003: Rayo Vallecano (assistant)
- 2004–2005: Olimpia (assistant)
- 2005–2006: Universidad de Concepción
- 2008: Cobreloa (assistant)
- 2009–2011: Colo-Colo (youth)
- 2009: Colo-Colo (interim)
- 2011: Palestino (assistant)
- 2013: Sol de América
- 2018: Colo-Colo (assistant)
- 2019–2020: Colo-Colo (youth)
- 2020: Colo-Colo (interim)

Gualberto Ramón Jara Vera (Asunción, Paraguay, July 13, 1959) is a Paraguayan football manager.

== Teams (assistant coach) ==
- Cerro Corá (1993)
- Olimpia (1994)
- Colo-Colo (1995-1998)
- Racing de Santander (1999-2001)
- Racing de Santander (2002)
- Rayo Vallecano (2003)
- Olimpia (2004-2005)
- Cobreloa (2008)
- Palestino (2011)
- Colo-Colo (2018)

== Teams (coach) ==
- Universidad de Concepción (2005–2006)
- Colo-Colo (youth) (2009–2011)
- Colo-Colo (interim) (2009)
- Sol de América (2013)
- Colo-Colo (interim) (2020)
- Colo-Colo (youth) (2019–2020)

== Titles ==
- (Chile) Colo-Colo 1996, 1997 and 1998 (Chilean Championship)
