= 2010–11 Primera B Metropolitana =

Primera B Metropolitana
- Season: 2010–11
- Champions: Atlanta (3rd. title)
- Promoted: Atlanta
- Relegated: Deportivo Español
- Matches played: 462
- Goals scored: 925 (2 per match)
- Top goalscorer: (Argentina) Leonardo Romero (Argentina) Javier Grbec
- Biggest home win: Brown (A) 5–0 Colegiales
- Biggest away win: C. Córdoba (R) 0–4 Estudiantes BA
- Highest scoring: Comunicaciones 4–4 Flandria

The 2010-11 Argentine Primera B Metropolitana was the 112th. season of Primera B Metropolitana, the third division of the Argentine football league system. The season began on 24 July 2010 and ended on 4 June 2011. A total of 22 clubs participated in the competition.

Atlanta won their 3rd. Primera B Metrop title promoting to Primera Nacional, while Deportivo Español was relegated to Primera C.

== Club information ==
Club	City	Province	Stadium
Acassuso	Boulogne	Buenos Aires	La Quema
Almagro	José Ingenieros	Buenos Aires	Tres de Febrero
Atlanta	Buenos Aires	autonomous city	León Kolbovski
Barracas Central	Buenos Aires	autonomous city	Barracas Central
Brown	Adrogué	Buenos Aires	Lorenzo Arandilla
Colegiales	Florida Oeste	Buenos Aires	Libertarios Unidos
Comunicaciones	Buenos Aires	autonomous city	Alfredo Ramos
Defensores de Belgrano	Buenos Aires	autonomous city	Juan Pasquale
Deportivo Armenio	Ingeniero Maschwitz	Buenos Aires	Armenia
Deportivo Morón	Morón	Buenos Aires	Nuevo Francisco Urbano
Estudiantes (BA)	Caseros	Buenos Aires	Ciudad de Caseros
Flandria	Jáuregui	Buenos Aires	Carlos V
Los Andes	Lomas de Zamora	Buenos Aires	Eduardo Gallardón
Nueva Chicago	Buenos Aires	autonomous city	Nueva Chicago
Platense	Florida	Buenos Aires	Ciudad de Vicente López
San Telmo	Dock Sud	Buenos Aires	Dr. Osvaldo Baletto
Sarmiento	Junín	Buenos Aires	Eva Perón
Deportivo Español	Buenos Aires	(autonomous city)	Nueva España
Sportivo Italiano	Ciudad Evita	Buenos Aires	Sportivo Italiano
Temperley	Temperley	Buenos Aires	Alfredo Beranger
Tristán Suárez	Tristán Suárez	Buenos Aires	20 de Octubre
Villa San Carlos	Berisso	Buenos Aires	Gennasio Salice

== Table ==
=== Standings ===
Pos	Team	Pld	W	D	L	GF	GA	GD	Pts	Promotion or qualification
1	Atlanta	42	26	8	8	68	37	+31	86	Primera B Nacional
2	Estudiantes	42	21	10	11	53	42	+11	73	Torneo Reducido
3	Defensores de Belgrano	42	19	14	9	48	28	+20	71	Torneo Reducido
4	Nueva Chicago	42	19	14	9	43	35	+8	71	Torneo Reducido
5	Brown	42	19	13	10	54	36	+18	70	Torneo Reducido
6	Deportivo Armenio	42	17	14	11	43	31	+12	65	Torneo Reducido
7	Barracas Central	42	15	19	8	50	29	+21	64	Torneo Reducido
8	Deportivo Morón	42	14	19	9	44	37	+7	61	Torneo Reducido
9	Villa San Carlos	42	18	6	18	45	43	+2	60	Torneo Reducido
10	Comunicaciones	42	17	9	16	41	41	0	60	
11	Almagro	42	16	10	16	52	51	+1	58	
12	Acassuso	42	13	17	12	46	43	+3	56	
13	Flandria	42	13	15	14	37	31	+6	54	
14	Colegiales	42	13	14	15	34	36	−2	53	
15	Platense	42	11	20	11	30	33	−3	53	
16	Sportivo Italiano	42	11	14	17	27	40	−13	47	
17	Tristán Suárez	42	11	13	18	40	54	−14	46	
18	Temperley	42	12	8	22	38	57	−19	44	
19	San Telmo	42	10	12	20	35	52	−17	42	
20	Sarmiento (J)	42	8	13	21	27	51	−24	37	
21	Deportivo Español	42	7	14	21	26	55	−29	35	
22	Los Andes	42	6	16	20	40	59	−19	34	

Updated to match(es) played on 3 June 2011. Source: AFA
Rules for classification: 1st points; 2nd goal difference; 3rd goals scored; 4th head-to-head points; 5th head-to-head goal difference; 6th head-to-head goals scored. This does not apply to determining the champion. If two or more teams had been tied in point at the end of the tournament, a playoff would have been held at a neutral venue within 72 hours for the championship

== Torneo Reducido ==
Teams placed 2nd. to 9th. participated in "torneo reducido", a single-elimination tournament that decided which team would play the Promoción vs the worst placed team of 2010–11 Primera B Nacional season. Defensores de Belgrano was the winning squad.

Quarterfinals
2	Estudiantes (BA)	1	–	1
9	Villa San Carlos	3	–	3
3	Defensores de Belgrano	1	–	1
8	Deportivo Morón	0	–	0
4	Nueva Chicago	3	–	3
7	Barracas Central	3	–	3
5	Brown	1	–	1
6	Deportivo Armenio	1	–	1

Semifinals
9	Villa San Carlos	0	–	0
3	Defensores de Belgrano	2	–	2
4	Nueva Chicago	2	–	2
5	Brown	1	–	1

Final
3	Defensores de Belgrano	1	1	2
4	Nueva Chicago	2	0	2

=== Promotion playoff matches ===
Winner of torneo reducido (Defensores de Belgrano) played in a two-legged tie vs the 2010–11 Primera B Nacional penultimate team (Independiente Rivadavia).

Team 1	Agg.	Team 2	1st leg	2nd leg
Independiente Rivadavia	2–2	Defensores de Belgrano	2–2	0–0

Result was 2–2 on goal difference. Independiente Rivadavia remained in Primera B Nacional due to being the team from the upper division (sporting advantage).

== Relegation ==
Pos	Team	2008–09 Pts	2009–10 Pts	2010–11 Pts	Total Pts	Total Pld	Avg	Relegation
1	Atlanta	57	58	86	201	122	1.648	
2	Estudiantes	60	61	73	194	122	1.59	
3	Nueva Chicago	67	51	71	189	122	1.549	
4	Barracas Central	—	—	64	64	42	1.524	
5	Defensores de Belgrano	59	55	71	185	122	1.516	
6	Sportivo Italiano	74	—	47	121	82	1.476	
7	Colegiales	62	61	53	176	122	1.443	
8	Sarmiento (J)	64	75	37	176	122	1.443	
9	Brown	47	54	70	171	122	1.402	
10	Deportivo Morón	63	47	61	171	122	1.402	
11	Acassuso	53	55	56	164	122	1.344	
12	Villa San Carlos	—	48	60	108	82	1.317	
13	Temperley	59	56	44	159	122	1.303	
14	Platense	—	—	53	53	42	1.262	
15	Almagro	—	44	58	102	82	1.244	
16	Tristán Suárez	43	62	46	151	122	1.238	
17	Club Comunicaciones	47	35	60	142	122	1.164	
18	Deportivo Armenio	38	38	65	141	122	1.156	
19	Flandria	40	47	54	141	122	1.156	
20	San Telmo	44	54	42	140	122	1.148	
21	Los Andes	—	60	34	94	82	1.146	Relegation Playoff Matches
22	Deportivo Español	47	44	35	126	122	1.033	Primera C Metropolitana

=== Relegation playoff matches ===
The second worst placed team (Los Andes) played vs the winner of torneo reducido of 2010–11 Primera C (Central Córdoba de Rosario).

Team 1	Agg.	Team 2	1st leg	2nd leg
Los Andes	2–0	Central Córdoba (R)	1–0	1–0

Los Andes won 2–0 on aggregate, remaining in Primera B Metro.

== See also ==
- 2010–11 in Argentine football
