= Matías Zamora =

Chilean footballer

Personal information
- Full name: Matías Josué Zamora Carreño
- Date of birth: 9 September 1994 (age 32)
- Place of birth: Quilpué, Chile
- Height: 1.90 m (6 ft 3 in)
- Position: Striker

Team information
- Current team: Deportivo Chiquimulilla

Youth career
- Santiago Wanderers
- Unión La Calera
- Everton

Senior career*
Years	Team	Apps	(Gls)
2015–2016	Provincial Marga Marga	–	(–)
2016	Estación Central	–	(–)
2017	Deportes Limache	–	(–)
2018	Puerto Quito	–	(–)
2018	Duros del Balón	–	(–)
2019	Deportes Puerto Montt	–	(–)
2019	Deportes Vallenar	21	(8)
2020–2021	Deportes Valdivia	26	(12)
2021–2022	Santiago Morning	48	(6)
2023	Deportes Limache	21	(5)
2024	Concón National	13	(2)
2024	San Marcos	12	(0)
2025	Brujas de Salamanca	18	(1)
2025	Tlaxcala	0	(0)
2026	Ranger's	7	(1)
2026–	Deportivo Chiquimulilla	0	(0)
- * Club domestic league appearances and goals as of 8 October 2026

Matías Josué Zamora Carreño (born 9 September 1994) is a Chilean footballer who plays as a striker for Guatemalan club Deportivo Chiquimulilla.

== Career ==
As a youth player, Zamora was with Santiago Wanderers, Unión La Calera and Everton de Viña del Mar, all of them from Valparaíso Region. He began his career at minor categories of the Chilean football with Provincial Marga Marga, Deportivo Estación Central and Deportes Limache.

In 2018, he moved to Ecuador and played for Puerto Quito, and Duros del Balón

Back in Chile, he joined Deportes Puerto Montt. Subsequently, he has played for Deportes Vallenar, Deportes Valdivia, Santiago Morning and Deportes Limache, with whom he won the 2023 Segunda División Profesional.

For the 2024 season, he joined Concón National in the Segunda División Profesional de Chile.

In December 2025, Zamora joined Mexican club Tlaxcala.

In March 2026, Zamora moved to Europe and joined Ranger's in the Primera Divisió. Back to America, he joined Guatemalan club Deportivo Chiquimulilla in the Liga Primera División in October of the same year.
