= Benjamín Rivera (footballer) =

Chilean footballer (born 1999)

Personal information
- Full name: Benjamín Nicolás Rivera Silva
- Date of birth: 23 October 1999 (age 27)
- Place of birth: Viña del Mar, Chile
- Height: 1.84 m (6 ft 1/2 in)
- Position: Midfielder

Team information
- Current team: General Velásquez
- Number: 28

Youth career
- Everton

Senior career*
Years	Team	Apps	(Gls)
2018–2022	Everton	54	(0)
2022	→ Deportes Iquique (loan)	16	(0)
2023	Deportes Temuco	24	(1)
2024–2025	Concón National	43	(3)
2026–	General Velásquez	0	(0)
- * Club domestic league appearances and goals as of 4 April 2026

Benjamín Nicolás Rivera Silva (born 23 October 1999) is a Chilean footballer who plays for General Velásquez.

== Career ==
A product of the Everton de Viña del Mar youth system, Rivera was loaned out to Deportes Iquique in 2022 on a one-year deal.

In 2023, he switched to Deportes Temuco.

In 2024, he signed with Concón National in the Segunda División Profesional de Chile.
