= José Velásquez Bórquez =

Chilean general (1833–1897)

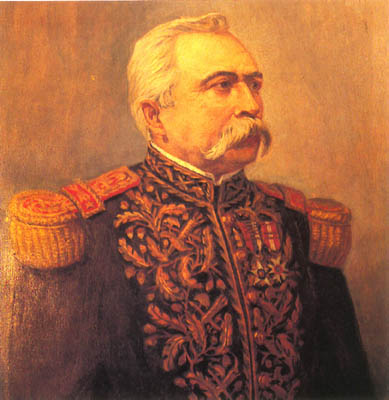
- Portrait of Borgez by Jesús Núñez González (1870-1953)
- Born: December 27, 1833; Puchuncaví, Chile
- Died: July 17, 1897 (aged 63); San Vicente de Tagua-Tagua, Chile
- Military career
- Branch: Chilean Army
- Rank: General
- Known for: participating in the Chilean Civil War of 1859

José Velásquez Bórquez (December 27, 1833 – July 17, 1897) was a Chilean general best known for participating in the civil war of 1859 against the Conservative government of Manuel Montt. Later in life, Bórquez was elected to the Chilean Parliament.

== Military training ==
On April 23, 1853, Velásquez entered the Military Academy as cadet. He graduated January 14, 1854 as Second Lieutenant of the Artillery regiment and where he stayed until the May 16, 1857. He was promoted to Lieutenant on the 12 of February, 1859. He was eventually appointed as Lieutenant Colonel in February 1872, and later to Colonel on January 21, 1874. His command was to inspect the border, artillery batteries and to examine warehouses in the south. In 1879 he held 3 positions. First, Commander of the civic battalion of "Los Angeles", second, Commander of the Brigade Artillery of Antofagasta Line, and last, Commander of the Battalion Artillery of Line Antofagasta.

=== Pacification of Araucania ===
Velásquez participated in the campaign of Araucania, especially in the cities Mulchén, Angol and Lebu. In April 1865 he was commissioned to first recover the Vergara River from Angol, then was appointed Battalion Commander Caupolicán Civic, Civic Inspector Battalion Commander San Felipe and Los Angeles Civic Battalion.

== Pacific War ==
At the outbreak of the Pacific War, Velásquez was assigned to the city of Antofagasta where he was appointed Commander of the Regiment of Artillery #2, and served during the bombing of Antofagasta. He fought at the Battle of Dolores, Tacna and Arica. He was appointed Commanding General of Artillery and fought heroically in the battles of San Juan and Miraflores. Then he was appointed Commanding General of Weapons of Tacna and Arica.

Velásquez was later promoted to the rank of Brigadier General and was elected MP for Quillota from 1888 to 1891, and was appointed Minister of War and Navy under President José Manuel Balmaceda Fernández. During the 1891 civil war he supported the government, with Chief of the Army Balmacedista. After the Civil War, he suffered imprisonment and torture, and in 1892 he was released thanks to the amnesty and general pardon by President Jorge Montt Álvarez. He later ran for the Liberal Democratic Party and was elected Deputy for Santiago from 1894 until his death in 1897.
