= Colchagua CD =

Chilean football club

Colchagua
- Full name: Colchagua Club de Deportes
- Nicknames: Colchagüinos, Sanfernandinos, La Herradura (The Horseshoe)
- Founded: January 23, 1957
- Ground: Jorge Silva Valenzuela Municipal Stadium; San Fernando, Chile
- Capacity: 5,900
- Chairman: Jorge Salazar
- Manager: Gerardo Silva
- League: Segunda División
- 2020: 5th
Home colours	Away colours

Colchagua Club de Deportes or just Colchagua is a Chilean football club. Their hometown is San Fernando in Chile. They currently play in the Segunda Division Profesional de Chile (Second Division of Chile) of Chilean football, which is actually the thirth division on Chilean football due to ANFP ruling. Its traditional rivals are Rancagua Sur and O'Higgins, both from the city of Rancagua in the O'Higgins Region which is where San Fernando is also located. It also has rivalry with General Velásquez from the nearby town of San Vicente and with Deportes Santa Cruz. They additionally share some kind of brotherhood and healthy rivalry at the same time with Curicó Unido from the city of Curicó in the Maule Region. This is because San Fernando and Curicó are both close to the regional border between O'Higgins and Maule, and both cities are approximately 45 minutes away from each other, so when the La Granja stadium started its reconstruction during early 2010, Colchagua let Curicó Unido play as local at the Jorge Silva Valenzuela stadium in San Fernando. These two teams dispute the Clásico Huaso because both teams are located in the denominated Zona Huasa (Huasa Zone) of the country.

== Titles ==
- Tercera División (2): 1987, 1998

== Squad ==
As of 27 July 2026. Note: Flags indicate national team as defined under FIFA eligibility rules; some limited exceptions apply. Players may hold more than one non-FIFA nationality.

No.	Pos.	Nation	Player
1	GK	CHI	Rodrigo Cancino
2	DF	ARG	Mateo Martín
4	DF	CHI	Manuel Olea (c)
5	DF	ARG	Carlos Rodríguez
6	FW	CHI	Alexis Ponce
7	MF	CHI	Renato Díaz
8	MF	CHI	Rodrigo Díaz
9	FW	CHI	Matías Pérez
10	MF	CHI	Juan Tobar
12	GK	CHI	José Tomás Quezada
13	DF	CHI	Felipe Guzmán
14	FW	CHI	Cristián Yáñez
15	MF	MEX	David Franco
16	MF	CHI	Osvaldo Carrasco

No.	Pos.	Nation	Player
17	FW	CHI	Cristián Valenzuela
18	DF	CHI	Diego Salas
19	FW	CHI	Juan José Sánchez
20	MF	CHI	Cristóbal Marín
21	MF	CHI	Carlos Opazo
22	FW	CHI	Matías Belmar
23	MF	CHI	Claudio Pavez (loan from O'Higgins)
24	FW	CHI	Emilio Moreno
27	DF	CHI	Ricardo Segovia
30	DF	CHI	Joaquín Ibarra
32	GK	CHI	Fabricio Vera
33	MF	CHI	Ignacio Caroca
39	FW	CHI	Matías Donoso
41	MF	ARG	Exequiel Márquez

== Managers ==
- (Chile) Francisco Hormazábal (1957–1958)
- (Chile) Néstor Matamala (1970–1972)
- (Chile) Raúl Pino (1972–1973)
- (Chile) Néstor Valdés (1976)
- (Chile) Enrique Hormazábal (1978)
- (Chile) Jorge Toro (1979)
- (Chile) Ramón Climent (1980)
- (Chile) Óscar Andrade (1981)
- (Chile) José González (1987)
- (Chile) Bernardo Bello (1988)
- (Chile) Eduardo Pérez (1989)
- (Chile) José González (1990–1991)
- (Chile) Raúl Toro (1994–1995)
- (Chile) Benjamín Valenzuela (1996)
- (Chile) José González (1996)
- (Chile) Esaú Bravo (1996)
- (Chile) Gerardo Silva (1998–1999)
- (Chile) Germán Cornejo (1999–2000)
- (Chile) Gerardo Silva (2007–2009)
- (Chile) Juan Carreño (2009–2011)
- (Chile) Hernán Castro (2011)
- (Chile) Eduardo Cortázar (2012)
- (Chile) Rubén Vallejos (2012)
- (Chile) Eduardo Soto (2013)
- (Chile) Eduardo Cortázar (2013)
- (Chile) Raúl González (2014–2015)
- (Chile) Eduardo Cortázar (2015–2016)
- (Chile) Raúl González (2016)
- (Chile) Luis Fredes (2016–2017)
- (Argentina) Néstor Zanatta (2017)
- (Chile) Raúl González (2017–2018)
- (Chile) Francisco Arrué (2019)
- (Chile) René Curaz (2020)
- (Chile) Francisco Arrué (2020–2021)
- (Chile) René Ávila (2021)
- (Chile) Pablo Pacheco (2021)
- (Chile) Gerardo Silva (2022)
- (Chile) René Curaz (2023)
- (Chile) Diego Miranda (2023)
- (Chile) Gerardo Silva (2024)
- (Chile) Raúl González (2025–Present)

== See also ==
- Chilean football league system
