= Estadio Juan Pasquale =

Football stadium in Buenos Aires, Argentina

Juan Pasquale Stadium
- Estadio Juan Pasquale
- Nido del Dragón
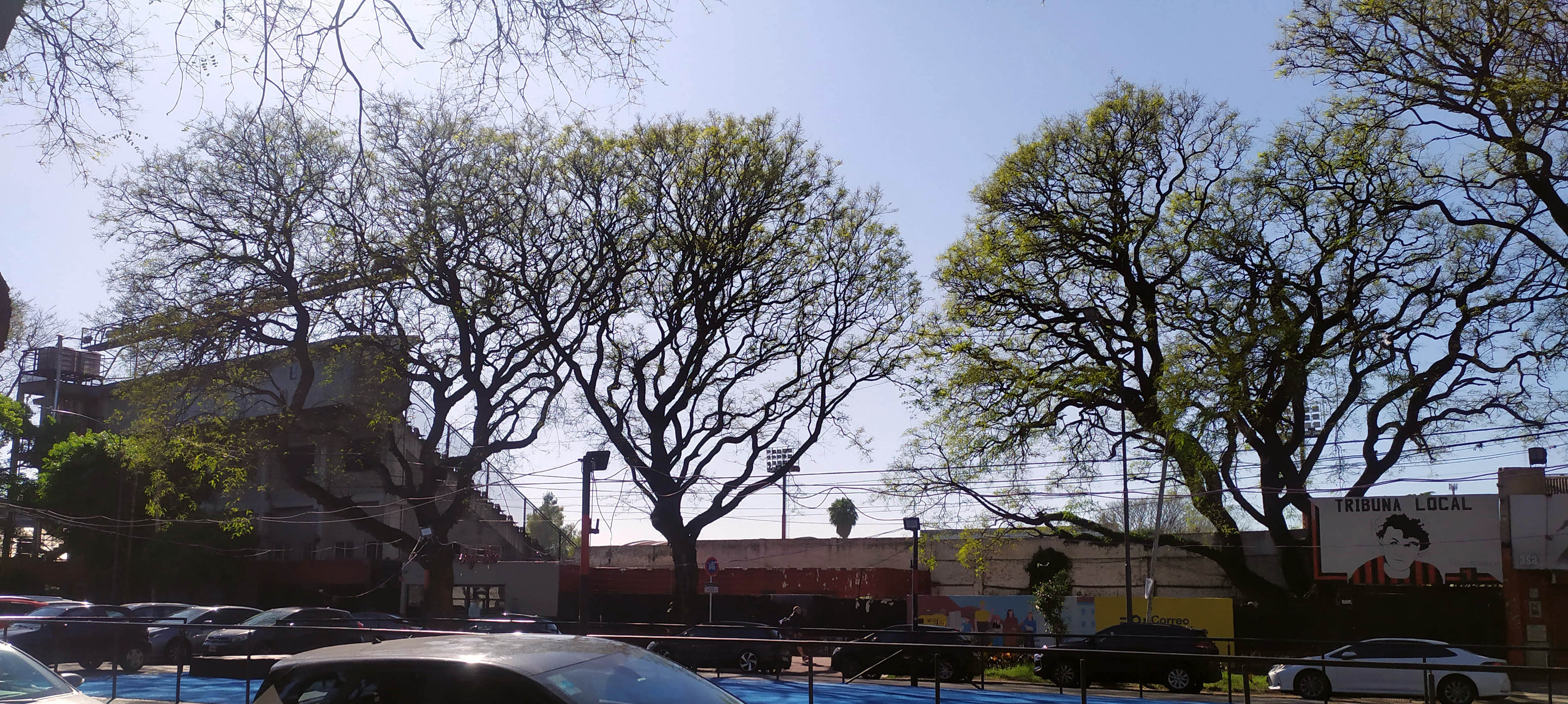
- Exterior view of the stadium in 2024
- Interactive map of Juan Pasquale Stadium
- Address: Av. Comodoro Rivadavia 1450; Buenos Aires; Argentina
- Coordinates: 34.5412°S 58.4618°W
- Owner: Defensores de Belgrano
- Capacity: 9,000
- Type: Stadium
- Surface: Grass
- Field size: 98 x 68 m

Construction
- Opened: 25 May 1910; 116 years ago

Tenant
- Defensores de Belgrano (1910–present)

Website
- defeweb.com.ar/venue

Estadio Juan Pasquale is a football stadium located in the city of Buenos Aires, Argentina. It is owned and operated by Club Defensores de Belgrano and one of the oldest stadiums in the city, having been opened in 1910. The stadium has a capacity of 9,000 spectators.

The stadium was named after Juan Pasquale, founding member, player, and first president of the institution.

== History ==
In the beginning, "Defensores de Belgrano Foot-Ball Club" (as it was originally named) played their first games in the Quinta de Oliver (then located on Plaza Chacabuco, current Plaza Alberti), a vacant land by then. When the Municipality of Buenos Aires decided to refurbish the square, the club had to move its field to its current location on Av. Comodoro Rivadavia in the Núñez barrio.

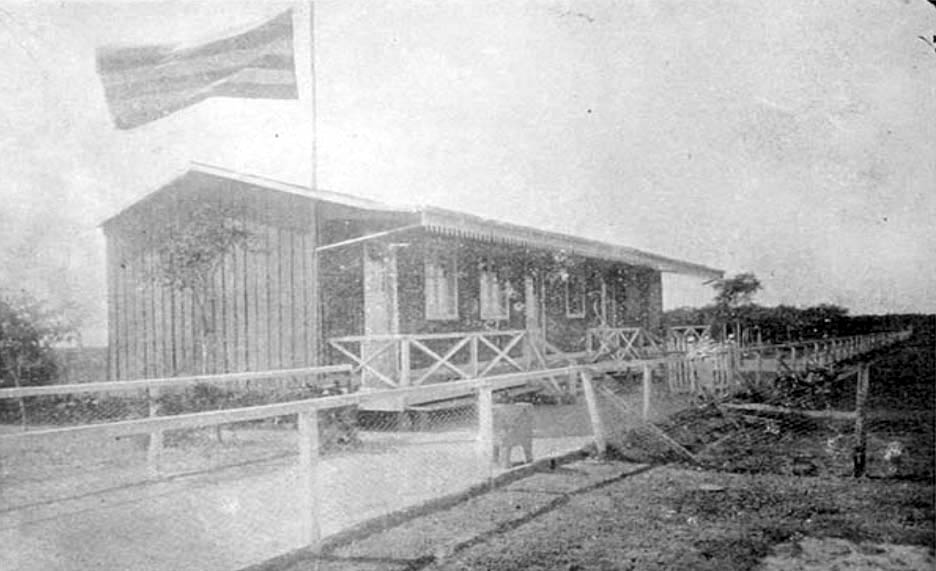
View of the stadium field and stands in 1922

Some sources state that the land where the stadium would be built, was granted by the Municipality thanks to the negotiations carried out by Berón de Astrada, while others say that baron Demarchi offered the land to the club. The wooden stands that had been used to host the attendance during the military parades in the Argentine Centennial celebrations had been left after being used on Blandengues street –today Avenida del Libertador–. Therefore, the structure was carried to the stadium, becoming its first stands.

The venue was inaugurated on 25 May 1910 (the date of the Centennial of Argentina), only four years after the club was founded. It is nicknamed Nido del Dragón (Nest of the Dragon), referring to a dragon, the nickname of the team. It was due to artist and club supporter Hugo Arbona, who designed that creature in 1983 as a symbol for Defensores de Belgrano.

In 2001, the club gave the grandstand placed on Avenida del Libertador's side the name "Marcos Zucker (h)" as a tribute to the son of actor Marcos Zucker, who was a Defensores fan and was disappeared during the National Reorganization Process that lasted from 1976 to 1983. The idea came from Arbona himself and the sign with Zucker's name was unveiled in the year the country commemorated the 25th. anniversary of the 1976 Argentine coup d'état.
