= Byron Bustamante =

Chilean footballer (born 1995)

Personal information
- Full name: Byron Ariel Bustamante Gamboa
- Date of birth: 3 February 1995 (age 31)
- Place of birth: San Vicente de Tagua Tagua, Chile
- Height: 1.69 m (5 ft 7 in)
- Position: Midfielder

Team information
- Current team: General Velásquez

Youth career
- Escuela Daniel Fabbiani
- O'Higgins

Senior career*
Years	Team	Apps	(Gls)
2015	San Antonio Unido	6	(1)
2016–2017	Magallanes	3	(0)
2018	General Velásquez	26	(1)
2019–2021	Deportes Puerto Montt	51	(8)
2021–2023	Santiago Wanderers	15	(0)
2021–2022	→ Deportes Temuco (loan)	40	(3)
2023	→ Deportes Santa Cruz (loan)	16	(1)
2024	Deportes Temuco	29	(2)
2025	Cobreloa	12	(0)
2026–	General Velásquez	0	(0)
- * Club domestic league appearances and goals as of 16 March 2026

Byron Ariel Bustamante Gamboa (born 3 February 1995) is a Chilean footballer who plays as a midfielder for General Velásquez.

== Club career ==
Born in San Vicente de Tagua Tagua, Chile, Bustamante was trained at Escuela de Fútbol (Football Academy) Daniel Fabbiani from his hometown and O'Higgins. He made his professional debut with San Antonio Unido in the Segunda División Profesional de Chile in 2015. After two seasons with Magallanes, he got regularity with General Velásquez in 2018.

In 2019, Bustamante joined Deportes Puerto Montt for two seasons. In 2021, he signed with Santiago Wanderers in the Chilean Primera División. He was loaned out to Deportes Temuco in August 2021 and Deportes Santa Cruz in 2023.

In 2024, Bustamante returned to Deportes Temuco. The next season, he switched to Cobreloa.

In March 2026, Bustamante returned to General Velásquez in the Segunda División Profesional de Chile.

== Personal life ==
He is the son of the football manager César Bustamante.
