= Brayan Garrido =

Chilean footballer

Personal information
- Full name: Brayan Andrés Garrido Martínez
- Date of birth: 22 January 1999 (age 27)
- Place of birth: Maipú, Santiago, Chile
- Height: 1.73 m (5 ft 8 in)
- Position: Midfielder

Team information
- Current team: Deportes Iquique

Youth career
- Coquimbo Unido
- Magallanes
- Universidad de Chile

Senior career*
Years	Team	Apps	(Gls)
2018–2019	Universidad de Chile	0	(0)
2019	→ Deportes Melipilla (loan)	6	(0)
2020–2021	Deportes Melipilla	51	(0)
2022–2023	Unión La Calera	42	(1)
2024	Santiago Wanderers	26	(0)
2025	Huachipato	19	(1)
2026–	Deportes Iquique	0	(0)
- * Club domestic league appearances and goals as of 18 January 2026

Brayan Andrés Garrido Martínez (born 22 January 1999) is a Chilean footballer who plays as a midfielder for Deportes Iquique.

== Club career ==
Born in Maipú commune, Santiago de Chile, Garrido was with the football academies of Coquimbo Unido and Magallanes based in his hometown before joining the Universidad de Chile youth ranks. In January 2019, he was loaned out to Deportes Melipilla.

In 2020, Garrido renewed with Deportes Melipilla, getting the promotion to the 2021 Chilean Primera División. He continued with them in the top division.

On 5 January 2022, Garrido signed with Unión La Calera, taking part in the 2022 Copa Sudamericana. In January 2024, he switched to Santiago Wanderers.

In 2025, Garrido signed with Huachipato. The next year, he moved to Deportes Iquique.

== Honours ==
Huachipato

- Copa Chile: 2025
