= Víctor Fuentes (Chilean footballer) =

Chilean footballer and manager (born 1972)

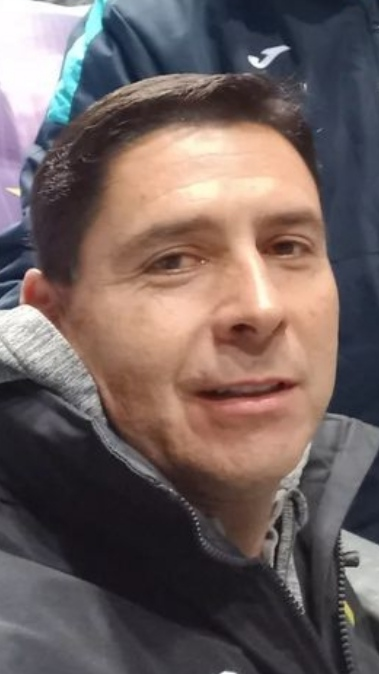
- Fuentes with O'Higgins in 2024.

Personal information
- Full name: Víctor Hugo Fuentes Moreno
- Date of birth: 1 July 1972 (age 54)
- Place of birth: Rancagua, Chile
- Height: 1.84 m (6 ft 0 in)
- Position: Defender

Team information
- Current team: O'Higgins (youth manager)

Youth career
- O'Higgins

Senior career*
Years	Team	Apps	(Gls)
1991–1992	O'Higgins	4	(0)
1993–1994	Deportes Puerto Montt		
1995–2002	Unión Española	126+	(6+)
2003	Universidad de Concepción	12	(0)
2004	Rangers de Talca	12	(0)
2004	Palestino	0	(0)
2005	O'Higgins	3	(0)

Managerial career
- 2006–2015: O'Higgins (youth)
- 2015: General Velásquez
- 2016–2017: O'Higgins (assistant)
- 2017–2024: O'Higgins (youth)
- 2020: O'Higgins (interim)
- 2024: O'Higgins
- 2025–: O'Higgins (youth)
- * Club domestic league appearances and goals

Víctor Hugo Fuentes Moreno (born 1 July 1972) is a Chilean football manager and former player who played as a defender. He is the current manager of O'Higgins' youth setup.

== Playing career ==
Born in Rancagua, Fuentes was a youth product of hometown side O'Higgins, and made his first team debut in 1991. After featuring rarely, he moved to Segunda División side Deportes Puerto Montt for the 1993 season, before joining Unión Española in the Primera División in 1995.

Fuentes suffered relegation with La Furia in 1997, the first-ever in the club's history, but was also in the squad during the 1999 campaign, as they achieved promotion as champions. After leaving the club at the end of the 2002 season, he subsequently represented Universidad de Concepción, Rangers de Talca and Palestino also in the top tier before returning to O'Higgins in 2005, with the club now in the second division. He retired with the latter at the end of the year, aged 33.

== Managerial career ==
After retiring, Fuentes worked as a youth coach at his last club O'Higgins before becoming a manager of Tercera A side General Velásquez in October 2015. In December, he returned to O'Higgins as an assistant of Cristián Arán in the main squad.

In July 2017, Fuentes returned to the youth sides after Arán was sacked. On 10 October 2020, he was named interim manager after Patricio Graff left, and managed the club for one match (a 2–1 loss to Audax Italiano) before returning to his previous role five days later.

On 6 May 2024, Fuentes was again named interim, after the departure of Juan Manuel Azconzábal. Three days later, he was permanently appointed manager of the club.

== Honours ==
=== Player ===
Unión Española

- Primera B de Chile: 1999
