= Cobreloa =

Chilean football club

- Full name: Club de Deportes Cobreloa S.A.D.P.
- Nicknames: Zorros del desierto (desert foxes); Loínos; Mineros (Miners); Naranjas (Oranges)
- Founded: 7 January 1977; 49 years ago, as Club de Deportes Cobreloa
- Stadium: Estadio Zorros del Desierto; Calama, Chile
- Capacity: 12,102
- Coordinates: 22°27′36″S 68°55′14″W
- President: Harry Robledo
- Head coach: Mario Salas
- League: Primera B
- 2025: Primera B, 3rd of 16
- Website: cobreloa.cl
Home colours	Away colours

Club de Deportes Cobreloa S.A.D.P. (Spanish pronunciation: [ˈkluβ ðe ðeˈpoɾtes koβɾeˈloa]), commonly referred to as Cobreloa, is a professional Chilean football club based in Calama, Región de Antofagasta, Chile. They compete in the Primera B. The club's home ground is the Estadio Zorros del Desierto, Currently, trained by the coach, Mario Salas.

Founded on 7 January 1977, by the initiative of various local groups and the Chilean state-owned enterprise, CODELCO. This club was created starting from the Legal Personality of the local club, Deportes El Loa. On 30 March 2006, the club changed to a Limited sports company with the unanimous approval of 56 of its socios (members). According to the 2023 year public report, the capital of the club is $7.534 billion CLP ($7,760,020.00 USD) spread on 1.100.000 shares of stock without nominal value, mostly owned by the socios (members of club), since 2013, by means of an extraordinary shareholders' meeting on second call, with 1099,999 of them and the president of the club with 2 share, the first is in his capacity as president of the club and the other is as president of the board of directors of the corporation. In 2024 the first team budget was $77,900 million CLP.

The club's professional debut in Segunda división professional de Chile was in 1977, achieving the promotion to Primera División in the same year. The club has won the Primera División title 8 times, the 1986 Copa Polla Lan Chile and the 2023 Primera B de Chile. Some of its rivalries are with Club Social y Deportivo Colo-Colo team in the Clásico Albo-Loíno, Club de Deportes Cobresal who dispute the Clasico del Cobre and Deportes Antofagasta in the Clasico de la región de Antofagasta.

In 2019, The Rec.Sport.Soccer Statistics Foundation sorted out in the 71st position in the Worldwide Historical Ranking of Clubs. In CONMEBOL Libertadores Ranking 2025 it is in 67th position.

== History ==
On 1 January 1948, 'Club Social Deportivo Deportes El Loa' was founded in Calama, Chile. This club was the first legal personality of the team and the first team in Calama in have this type of personality. In 1951, the team played in the Asociación de Fútbol de Calama with a second team with the name 'Cóndor'. Later, in February 1955, the team was renamed to 'Club Deportivo y Social Sport Cóndor.

In 1957, Calama entered on a tournament organized by the newly established Asociación Nacional de Fútbol Amateur de Chile, previously known as a federation, Calama had participated in previous amateur tournaments, such as in 1949 and 1953. The third Nacional Juvenil de Fútbol began on 28 July of that year. The organizers' goal was to select a group of players who would compete in the 1962 World Cup, which would be held in Chile. The first phase matches were played in regional divisions, with the Calama youth team facing off against its counterpart from Chuquicamata.

In 1959, the Calama Amateur team, coached by Roberto Rodríguez Antequera, won the 28th edition of the National Amateur Football Championship. The final was against Thomas Bata de Peñaflor, played at the Estadio Municipal de Calama. The score was 3–2 in extra time, after a 2–2 tie at the end of regulation time. The game-winner was scored by Valencia in the 8th minute of the first half. The team that played in the final was as follows:

Hidalgo, Soto, Tapia, Lillo, Aracena, Toro, Gutierrez, A. Portillo, Valencia, M. Portillo, and Vega.

28th Chilean National Amateur Football Championship
10 November 1959
Final

Calama	3–2	Peñaflor
A.Portillo 24'; Gutierrez 68'; Valencia 98'		Romero 59'; Grandi 79'

Estadio Municipal de Calama, Calama, Chile
Attendance: 2,400
Referee: Luis Orozco

This achievement allowed Calama to qualify for the Copa Chile of that same year, as an amateur team, but they only reached the round of 16 of the tournament, being eliminated in that round by Deportes La Serena, winning by one goal in the first leg and winning 6–0 in the second leg, qualifying them for the next phase.

By 1960, Sport Cóndor team was already participating in provincial championships in the region of Antofagasta with teams from Calama, such as Tronador, which would animate the matches of the Asociación de Fútbol de Calama of that decade; from Tocopilla as Chile Sporting, from Tal-Tal as Unión Caleta and the teams such Coquimbo and Correvuela from Chuquicamata.

Later, on Sunday, 17 December 1961, the Chuquicamata amateur, coached by Daniel Chirinos, team won the next edition of the Chilean National Amateur Football Tournament undefeated against Osorno 3–2, with a hat trick by Mario Valencia, at the Anaconda Stadium in Chuquicamata, before an audience of 6,346. The winning team's lineup was as follows:

Hidalgo, Silva, Gary, Cortés, Valencia, Reyes, León (Cortés), Portillo, Mario Valencia, Carvajal (Diaz), and Bustos.

29th Chilean National Amateur Football Championship
17 December 1961
Final

Chuquicamata	3–2	Osorno
Mario Valencia 29'; Mario Valencia 35'; Mario Valencia 92' (pen.)		Acuña 11'; Rubén Marcos

Estadio Anaconda de Chuquicamata, Chuquicamata, Chile
Attendance: 6,346
Referee: Pascual Vera

In the previous match, the Calama teams, coached this time by Jaime Meneses, and Peñaflor played, and the score ended in a 2–2 draw. These facts pushed to the 'El Loa' citizen the desire to have a professional team in the city.

Sport Cóndor has among its accolades the local championships of the Asociación de Calama, for 1961 and 1962.

In 1962, Sport Cóndor submitted its bid to participate in professional football. At that time, the club had the support of the Chile Exploration Company, then managed by the Anaconda Copper consortium, an international mining company, from which the state-owned company, CODELCO, would be born a decade later. Its then president, Carlos Seguel, was also the company's commercial manager and established links between the sports club and the company. The Asociación Central de Fútbol Profesional de Chile responded negatively to the request by the president of the club.

During the Holy Week period of 1964, the Calama and Chuquicamata teams played an international quadrangular, hosted in Calama, with a title in dispute, which included the participation of the Municipal de Lima international team from Peru and the Universidad Católica de Chile team, who were on tour. In the last matches of the competition, the Universidad Católica team defeated the Calama football team by 4 goals to 0, in favor of the Santiago team, the goals were scored by Foulijoux, Tobar, Gajardo and Isella. And the Municipal de Lima team defeated the Chuquicamata team by 5 goals to 1, with double goals by Etuchi, Drago Mosquera and Bernales, these results gave the winner of the international tournament to the Peruvian team Municipal de Lima.

In 1965, the Presidents' Congress of the Segunda División Tournament agreed that provincial teams would not be accepted into the tournament in order to compete in 1966. Therefore, the Sport Condor club was not eligible to apply to join the Segunda División during this period of time.

In January 1967, the idea of merging Sport Cóndor with Santiago Morning under the name of 'Loa Morning' to venture into professional football was originated by the Asociación de Fútbol de Calama, the choice at that time was the financial crisis of the chosen team, which led it to relegate to Segunda División; In August of the same year the board of Chile Exploration Company headed by Carlos Seguel accepted a period of formal approach with this team, but this idea failed due to the refusal of the partners and the board of directors of both teams.

On 2 January 1968, 'Gobernación del Loa' decided to introduce a football club to professional football to represent the northern chile region, to this end, they encouraged Cóndor and 'Correvuela', the team of the neighboring Chuquicamata, but this initiative failed because the 'Asociación Central de Fútbol' decided incorporate 'Antofagasta Portuario' like a representative. In 1969.

In press releases from the Illustrious Municipality of Calama, reference has been made to the fact that Club Sport Cóndor, later known as Deportes El Loa, leased the Calama Municipal Stadium for its sporting events. These leases date from 1969 to 1974. Its subsequent attempts to enter professional football in the country independently are recorded. However, despite retaining the legal status of Sport Cóndor, it used the name Deportes El Loa, registering on 28 January 1970.

By 1971, the Sport Cóndor club, a club recognized by the Asociación Nacional de Fútbol Amateur of Chile, who made its application for the only place offered by the Asociación Central de Fútbol Profesional that year, by then, the application was reinforced by adding the name of Deportes El Loa, appearing as a double application, the manager who would be in charge of the institution would be Jorge Burboa, who participated in the integration into professionalism of clubs such as Federico Schwager and Huachipato, this application had the support of workers' unions in Chuquicamata, Calama, and the nitrate offices of Pedro de Valdivia and Maria Elena. The club already had 10,000 members, whose membership fees would be deducted from their payroll, the board of delegates finally decided to include the Independiente de Cauquenes team to enter the Segunda División that year. The request to enter the professional ranks was rejected again.

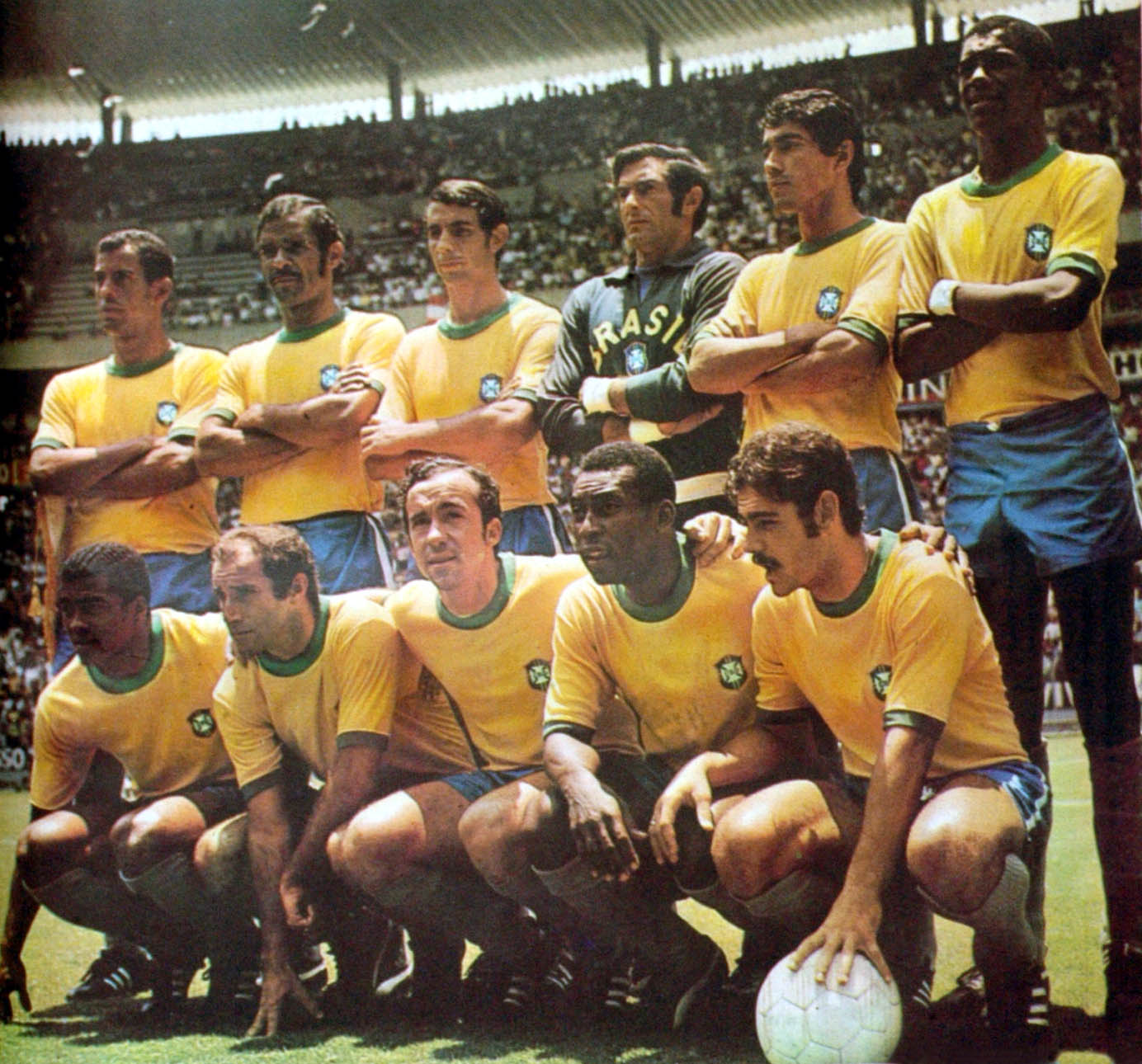
In the 1970s, the Brazilian national team was the benchmark for world football, being an inspiration to Roberto Rodriguez to make the jersey of Deportes El Loa.

The representative colors of Deportes El Loa were a yellow shirt, blue shorts, and white socks, similar to those of the Brazilian national team, since the team's coach, Roberto Rodriguez, liked the Brazilian national team's football. The team was a member of the Asociación de Fútbol de Calama. That February of this year, the team faced a row of friendly matches in the Estadio Municipal de Calama, against Unión San Felipe, versus Coquimbo Unido, winning both the matches by one goal to null, a draw between Colo-Colo to two goals tie and versus the Cuban national football team, which was touring Chile, and won 1–0 over the Cubans.

In 1972, the then Deportes El Loa team loaned players from its team to represent Calama in the thirty-fourth Campeonato Nacional de Fútbol Amateur. At the time, it was coached by Roberto Rodríguez and featured players who had played on professional teams, such as Héctor Torres, Jorge Garcés, and Gabriel Cáceres. To celebrate the first anniversary of the Chilean nationalization of copper, Calama offers a tribute at the Estadio Municipal of the city, in that event, Deportes El Loa plays a friendly match against Colo-Colo, losses by 2-5.

In 1974, another entry into the Asociación Central de Fútbol Profesional of Deportes El Loa, chaired by Carlos Seguel, was submitted for the first time. In 1975, the application for entry into professional football was again submitted, but was rejected again, on the grounds that Calama was outside the established limits for professional football. In that year, the player Carlos Rojas, enters the final of Deportes El Loa, coming from Unión Española. This player, who would return to play from the beginning of Cobreloa until 1990, won three national titles in the Primera División and one Copa Chile in 1986. He also had a period as a formative player trainer at the club, being one of the managers of the first sale of the club, Mauricio Donoso. He then had a stint as coach of the club's first team, in the 1997 and 1998 tournament, then in 2000. He then coached again in 2016.

The director board of 'Club Regional Antofagasta' held some talks with the regional Mayor of Region of Antofagasta in order to get Codelco workers to join and give one percent of their salary to the club, but the local government officials rejected the idea. There have also been indications that the club has expressed a desire to undertake the same unification exercise with the professional club Deportes Magallanes, but without success.

On 26 September 1976, the 'Cámara del Comercio', Railroad Unions, merchants and businessmen, sports directors of the 'El Loa' and also the Coronel Fernando Ibáñez, the prefect Francisco Núñez Venegas and the assistant directors of CODELCO, José Gorrini, Renzo Gasparini, Orlando Urbina and Nicolás Tschischow formed a committee called 'Pro Ingreso al Fútbol Rentado' with the purpose of induction 'Deportes El Loa' to professional football in Chile. The director of the hospital of Roy H. Glover, Sergio Stóppel joined this effort. United under the motto 'Ahora o Núnca' ('Now or never'), and was subsequently accepted into 'Segunda División' on 14 October in the same year. In December this initiative counted with the approval of clubs like Regional Antofagasta, Colo-Colo, Naval, Aviación, Huachipato, Coquimbo, Ovalle, Everton, Wanderers and O'higgins.

A work plan was developed prior to entering professional football. This consisted of consultations with top executives in the field, such as city coaches, and in-depth studies of the team. This included a review of the area's sports infrastructure. Commissions traveled across the country to gather useful information prior to the founding of the new team. The objective of all this was to meet the requirements necessary to enter the country's professional football sector. The work plan lasted six months.

First board of directors of the club
Position	Name
President	Francisco Nuñez Venegas
Vicepresident	José Gorrini
Vicepresident	Mario Puente
Secretary	Enrique Escala
Treasurer	Carlos Cordero
Director	Cesáreo Castillo
Director	Andrés Reghezza
Director	Pedro Cortéz
Director	Pedro Bustamente
Director	Omar Olivares
Director	Patricio Reyes
Director	Carlos Císternas
Director	Jaime Valderrama
Director	Segio Barrientos
Director	Héctor Pezoa
Director	Luis Gómez Araya
Director	Sergio Stoppel
Director	Pierre Kerhoff
Director	Jaime Salvatierra
Director	Guillermo Pérez
Delegate to the Asociación Central de Fútbol	Juan Beltrán

Due the inexperience of the directors of the team on professional football, they decided to sign up Alfonso Fuentes who had previously worked as a manager for Lota Schwager. The directors of the team, José Gorrini and Francisco Núñez, decided to incorporate to team as a section of CODELCO.

Fernando Riera, helped by Carlos Lillio Guerrero y Roberto Rodríguez, was asked to select the players for the team. They presented requirements to Executive Committee of the team to create the first squad with selection of the best players in the El Loa región. For this selection, mining workers who had previous Football experience were used. At the end of the day, the technical staff selected the following players:

Requeriments
- Bring to the club the best players on the province between 19 ultil 26 years old with exceptions
- Set up into the squad a solid group, fullness of friendship and fellowship.
- Create habits of good manners in and out the Pitch.
- Create a positive mentality pro to the introduction to professional football.

'El Loa' Selection team
No.	Pos	Nat	Player				
No.	Pos	Nat	Player	—	GK	CHI	Raúl López
—	GK	CHI	Player	Manuel Reyes			
—	DF	CHI	Player	Juan Maldonado			
—	DF	CHI	Luis Huanca				
—	DF	CHI	Jorge González				
—	DF	CHI	Carlos Rojas				
—	DF	CHI	Guillermo Palacios				
—	MF	CHI	Armando Alarcón				
—	MF	CHI	Juan Veas				
—	MF	CHI	Gabriel Cáceres				
—	FW	CHI	Héctor Castillo				
—	FW	CHI	Gustavo Cuello				
—	FW	CHI	Héctor Bravo				
—	FW	CHI	Ernesto Áviles				
—	FW	CHI	Guillermo González				

The selected team would begin regular training at Anaconda Stadium, with the goal of eventually being presented to the Asociación Central de Fútbol Profesional. This was at the request of Nicolás Tschichow, José Gorrini, and Mario Puente.

On 14 October of this year, Eduardo Gordon, president of the Asociación Central de Fútbol Profesional, received the executive committee's letter of introduction, signed by all the entities involved.

In November the team played previous matches before entering professional football, which would enter into the Segunda División championship of their country, their first match in this period was with Regional Antofagasta with a 2-2 goal tie, then facing the Copiapó team, achieving a victory and then against the Vallenar team by 6 goals to 3.

On 7 January 1977, the NCO School of Carabineros of Chile, all directors of Asociación Central de Fútbol and all representatives of Chilean football clubs were reunited at 18.30 P.M. in Calama and Chuquicamata. Through the local Radio, 'Radio El Loa', at 20.15 P.M. the incorporation of 'Deportes El Loa' to the professional football by unanimous 'Primera and Segunda división' clubs approval was officially announced. The other candidates are Deportes Colchagua, Unión San Felipe were also accepted into the professional football of the country.

The governor and the mayor of Calama, called to the citizens to support this new project, end celebrated the event. To celebrate this fact, they chose a new name for the team, rejecting the proposed 'Calama Loa' due to this name not being representative of mining that composes the main economic activity of the region. The name Deportes El Loa, under which the club was presented to the Asociación Central de Fútbol Profesional, was changed at the request of the same board of directors. At a meeting of the club's leaders, the name "Cobreloa" was chosen because the new name included the miner, his family, copper, and El Loa, thus representing all the inhabitants of the province. By this time the club already had a daily membership of 10,625. The exercise of eliminating the legal status of Deportes El Loa and giving rise to Deportes Cobreloa was carried out by Cesáreo Castillo, who was a leader of the Asociación de Fútbol de Calama until 1976 and also a prominent businessman in the city of Calama.

The first head coach of the club was elected in a shortlist between Salvador Nocetti, Pedro Morales, Luis Santibañez, Caopolicán Peña, Isaac Carrasco and Andrés Prieto. Initially, an offer was made to coach Pedro Morales, but he declined, and on his recommendation, the directors ultimately chose Andrés Prieto as the team's head coach for the season and he signs with the club on 15 January 1977.

When he was appointed team manager, Andres Prieto contacted the physical trainer, Gustavo Graef, at that time he was working for the Chilean National football Team, the negotiations were not fruitful because the team had to pay a higher amount than the national team to take him, discarding him. Then there were approaches with the coaches; Sergio Lillo, Armando Aravena, Alejandro Sanchez, however, none was available to address the deal. On Graef's recommendation, they contacted Alejandro Guzmán to be the team's first physical trainer, who ended up accepting the proposal. The technical staff is made up as follows:

First Technical Staff
Position	Staff
Head Coach	Andrés Prieto
Assistant Coaches	Carlos Lillo
Assistant Coaches	Raúl Rossi
Assistant Coaches	Víctor Pinochet
Head Fitness Coach	Alejandro Guzmán Valdés

he choose the first transfers of the first team, been the following.

First Transfers of the team
Date	Name	Moving from	Fee
January 1977	(Uruguay) Luis Garisto	(Uruguay) Peñarol	Undisclosed
January 1977	(Uruguay) Julio Correa	(Uruguay) Huracán Buceo	Undisclosed
January 1977	(Uruguay) Baudilio Jáuregui	(Uruguay) Defensor Sporting	Undisclosed
January 1977	(Chile) Juan Olivares	(Chile) Magallanes	Undisclosed
January 1977	(Chile) Francisco Valdés	(Chile) Santiago Wanderers	Undisclosed
January 1977	(Chile) Guillermo Yávar	(Chile) O'higgins	Undisclosed
January 1977	(Chile) Juan Rogelio Núñez	(Chile) Naval	Undisclosed
January 1977	(Chile) Germán Concha	(Chile) O'higgins	Undisclosed
January 1977	(Chile) Manfredo González	(Chile) Ñublense	Undisclosed
January 1977	(Chile) Raúl Gómez	(Chile) Lota Schwager	Undisclosed
January 1977	(Chile) Luis Ahumada	(Chile) Lota Schwager	Undisclosed
January 1977	(Chile) Daniel Díaz	(Chile) Magallanes	Undisclosed
January 1977	(Chile) Elmo Aedo	(Chile) Unión San Felipe	Undisclosed
January 1977	(Chile) Cristián Sasso	(Chile) Club Social y Deportivo Ovalle	Undisclosed
January 1977	(Chile) Sergio Pérez	(Chile) Ñublense	Undisclosed
January 1977	(Argentina) Carlos Pérez	(Argentina) Gimnasia y Esgrima de Mendoza	Undisclosed
Notes	*Juan Rogelio Núñez was the first professional player hired by the club in its history. *Former clubs register in the magazine, Revista Estadio of 1977.		

The first matches recorded as Deportes Cobreloa were those held on 9 January against the Chiquicamata youth team, with Cobreloa winning by 3 goals to 2 and The historical match of the team on 12 January of this year, against Tocopilla selection team, playing away. The result of the match was victory of the team by 0–1. Their first defeat was recorded on 30 January against Universidad Católica, losing 1–3 with Chuquicamata as the venue.

After the friendly matches in the local area, the team decided to continue their preseason preparations at the Las Vertientes Training Center in Santiago de Chile, where they would initially meet with the squad's foreign signings and the new management team. During this time, they faced teams from the capital, which would help them prepare for their first ever competitive season.

The first official match of the team was on the date 6 February of this year, playing away against 'Regional Antofagasta', on the Estadio 'Regional de Antofagasta' valid for 'Copa Chile', winning by 0–2 with goals of Armando Alarcón on 20' and Juan Rogelio Núñez on 34'.

The team entered the field with the following Line-Up:

Line-Up:

- Juan Olivares
- Elmo Aedo
- Luis Garisto
- Germán Concha
- Manfredo González
- Armando Alarcón (substituted off)
- Luis Huanca
- Gustavo Cuello
- Juan Rogelio Núñez
- Héctor Castillo
- Guillermo González
- Coach: Andrés Prieto

Substitutions

- Ernesto Avilés (substituted on)
1977 Copa Chile
6 February 1977
1st Round

Regional Antofagasta	0–2 Revista Estadio N° 1748	Cobreloa
		Armando Alarcón 20'; Juan Rogelio Núñez 34'

Estadio Regional de Antofagasta, Antofagasta, Chile
Attendance: 8,023
Referee: Miguel Luengo

In 1977, the club participated in Copa Chile and Segunda División de Chile of this season. In the national cup, the team being part of the group 4 of this, with the teams, Club Social y Deportivo Ovalle, Club de Deportes La Serena, Antofagasta Portuario and Coquimbo unido. The second gameweek on the 12 February, the team went to the La Serena to play against the homonymous team with name of the city, loses the game by 1–0, the third gameweek on the date 26 February, the team plays against Deportivo Ovalle in Calama, being this match the first official in this place for the club, the team won the match by two goals to one.

The team entered the field with the following Line-Up:

Line-Up:

- Carlos Pérez
- Raúl Gómez
- Luis Garisto
- Germán Concha
- Manfredo González
- Armando Alarcón
- Guillermo Yávar
- Gustavo Cuello
- Juan Rogelio Núñez
- Héctor Castillo
- Guillermo González (substituted off)
- Coach: Andrés Prieto

Substitutions

- Ernesto Avilés (substituted on)
1977 Copa Chile
26 February 1977
4st Round

Cobreloa	2–1 Revista Estadio N° 2 - 3 - 77	Ovalle
Juan Rogelio Núñez 14'; Héctor Castillo 75'

Estadio Municipal de Calama, Calama, Chile
Attendance: 9,635
Referee: Robinson Luengo

Finished the first row with Coquimbo Unido, won the match, on 2 March, by one goal to two. In the second row of the cup, the team draws with Antofagasta Portuario, by two goals, in Calama, on the date 5 March, the team faced the matchday with Deportes La Serena, losses the match, by one goal, on 9 March. Due difference of goals the team did not classifiqued to the Quarters Finals of the competition, being Deportivo Ovalle the team classifiqued to the next stage.

Pos	Team	Pld	W	D	L	GF	GA	GD	Pts	Qualification
1	Club Social y Deportivo Ovalle	8	3	4	1	16	11	+5	13	Advance to Quarters Finals of Copa Chile 1977
2	Cobreloa	8	4	1	3	13	10	+3	13	
3	Deportes La Serena	8	3	2	3	16	16	0	11	
4	Antofagasta Portuario	8	3	1	4	18	22	−4	10	
5	Coquimbo Unido	8	2	2	4	18	22	−4	8	

Source: Global Sports Archive

The following table show the goalscore of the team in this competition:

There were 13 goals scored in 8 matches, for an average of 1.62 goals per match.

4 goals

- (Chile) Juan Rogelio Nuñez

3 goals

- (Chile) Héctor Castillo

2 goals

- (Chile) Cristián Sasso

1 goal

- (Chile) Armando Alarcón
- (Chile) Guillermo González
- (Chile) Guillermo Yávar (Penalty score)
- (Chile) Gustavo Cuello

Source: Solofutbol.cl

The team had its debut in professional domestic leagues in the Segunda División de Chile of 1977. Its first match was against the team of San Luis de Quillota, in Calama. The team won that match by 1–0, with goal of Luis Ahumada. On Saturday, 30 April, the Striker Luis Ahumada scored an Hattrick against the team of Deportes Iberia and repeated the action with the team of San Antonio on the sixth gameweek. The first local match whom the team loss was against the team of Coquimbo Unido, the score was of 0–2 for the away team. At the final table the team finished in the fourth position, with 42 points, and 17 wins and a difference of goals of 15. This fact let it participated to the promotion playoffs of the competition, with the teams of Santiago Wanderers and Santiago Morning, teams of the Primera división de Chile of this year and Malleco únido, who finished the Segunda División de Chile tournament in third position. All theses matches were played in the Estadio Nacional of Chile. Finished the Playoffs, the team finish in the second place let it promote to Primera División de Chile to the next year, this due Santiago Morning who finished in first place in this playoff can remains its position in Primera División, relegated the team of Santiago Wanderers to Segunda División of the next year.

On 23 September 1977, the institution registered legally itself like Club de Deportes Cobreloa.

Pos	Team	Pld	W	D	L	GF	GA	GD	Pts	Qualification
1	Santiago Morning	3	2	1	0	7	3	+4	7	
2	Cobreloa	3	1	2	0	5	2	+3	5	Promoted to Primera Division de Chile 1978
3	Santiago Wanderers	3	0	2	1	3	6	−3	2	Relegated to Segunda Division de Chile 1978
4	Malleco Únido	3	0	1	2	2	6	−4	1	

Source: RSSSF.org

1977 Squad
Goalkeepers
No.	Pos	Nat	Player	Age	Goals						
No.	Pos	Nat	Player	Age	Goals	—	GK	CHI	Juan Olivares	Aged 35	0
—	GK	CHI	Player	Daniel Diáz							0
—	GK	ARG	Player	Carlos Pérez							0
Defenders			Player								0
—	DF	CHI	Player	Raúl Gómez	Aged 24	0					
—	DF	URU	Baudilio Jáuregui	Aged 31	1						
—	DF	CHI	Carlos Rojas	Aged 20	0						
—	DF	CHI	Germán Concha		1						
—	DF	CHI	Manfredo González		2						
—	DF	CHI	Cristián Sasso		3						
—	DF	CHI	Elmo Aedo		1						
—	DF	CHI	Juan Maldonado		0						
—	DF	URU	Luis Garisto	Aged 31	1						
Midfielders
—	MF	CHI	Armando Alarcón	Aged 23	2						
—	MF	CHI	Gustavo Cuello	Aged 32	2						
—	MF	CHI	Francisco Váldes	Aged 33	4						
—	MF	CHI	Mario Avilés		0						
—	MF	CHI	Luis Huanca		0						
—	MF	CHI	Guillermo Yávar	Aged 33	11						
—	MF	CHI	Héctor Castillo		3						
—	MF	CHI	Raúl Toro		0						
—	MF	CHI	Sergio Pérez	Aged 33	2						
Forwards
—	FW	CHI	Luis Ahumada	Aged 22	19						
—	FW	URU	Julio Correa	Aged 28	5						
—	FW	CHI	Guillermo González		3						
—	FW	CHI	Juan Rogelio Nuñez	Aged 23	10						
Notes	* The goals in the table are from all professional competitions of the team that season. * The Statistics are based in the magazine Revista Estadio over all 1977 Season.										

1977 Youth Squad
No.	Pos	Nat	Player	Age	Notes					
No.	Pos	Nat	Player	Age	Notes	—	CHI	Pablo Prieto	Aged 17	International for Chile U-20 to play the 1977 South American U-20 Championship.
—		CHI	Player	Daniel Cortés		The club recruits the player after scouting him at a tournament in Pedro de Valdivia				
—		CHI	Player	Miguel Alegre		The club recruits the player after scouting him at a tournament in Pedro de Valdivia				

Matches of domestic league of 1977 (Note: To compile this table, information was gathered from the Chilean Magazine 'Revista Estadio', issues 1,743 to 1,794, covering the period from 1 January to 28 December.)

=== Results by round ===
Round	1	2	3	4	5	6	7	8	9^{1}	10	11	12	13^{2}	14	15^{3}	16	17	18	19	20	21	22	23	24	25	26	27	28	29	30	31	32	33	34	35	36	37
Ground	H	A	H	A	H	H	A	H	H	H	A	H	A	H	A	H	A	A	A	H	A	H	A	H	A	A	H	A	H	A	H	A	H	A	H	A	H
Result	W	L	W	W	D	W	L	D	P	W	D	W	P	W	P	W	L	D	D	W	L	W	L	W	W	W	W	L	W	D	L	L	D	L	W	W	D
Position	4	8	4	5	4	4	4	5	6	3	5	4	5	4	4	2	2	4	4	4	3	2	2	2	2	2	1	1	1	1	2	3	3	5	3	3	4
Points^{4}	2	2	4	6	7	9	9	10	10	12	13	15	15	17	17	19	19	20	21	21	23	25	25	27	29	31	33	33	35	36	36	36	37	37	39	41	42

Source: Revista Estadio 1977 editions
A = Away; H = Home; W = Win; D = Draw; L = Loss; P = Postponed

^{1} Matchday 9 (vs Ferroviarios) was postponed to 25 August.
^{2} Matchday 13 (vs Malleco Unido) was postponed to 16 August.
^{3} Matchday 15 (vs Independiente Cauquenes) was postponed to 21 August.
^{4} To this League competition the victories add 2 points to the statistics.

April 1977 1	Cobreloa	1–0	San Luis	Calama, Chile
	Luis Ahumada			Stadium: Estadio Municipal de Calama

April 1977 2	Deportes La Serena	3-1	Cobreloa	La Serena, Chile
	Ermindo Onega (2 goals); Hugo Hernán Itér		Sergio Pérez	Stadium: Estadio La Portada

30 April 1977 3	Cobreloa	3-0	Iberia	Calama, Chile
	Luis Ahumada (3 goals)			Stadium: Estadio Municipal de Calama

8 May 1977 4	Curicó Unido	0-1	Cobreloa	Curicó, Chile
			Juan Rogelio Nuñez	Stadium: Fiscal La Granja

15 May 1977 5	Cobreloa	0–0	Colchagua	Calama, Chile
				Stadium: Estadio Municipal de Calama

22 May 1977 6	Cobreloa	4-0	San Antonio	Calama, Chile
	Julio Correa; Luis Ahumada (3 goals)			Stadium: Estadio Municipal de Calama

29 May 1977 7	Naval	3-1	Cobreloa	Talcahuano, Chile
	Ricardo Flores; José Lara; Gaete		Germán Concha	Stadium: Estadio El Morro

5 June 1977 8	Cobreloa	v	Unión San Felipe	Calama, Chile
	Luis Ahumada	1-1	Polo	Stadium: Estadio Municipal de Calama

25 August 1977 9	Cobreloa	2-0	Ferroviarios	Calama, Chile
	Julio Correa; Guillermo Yávar (Penalty)			Stadium: Estadio Municipal de Calama

19 June 1977 10	Cobreloa	2-0	Unión La Calera	Calama, Chile
	Guillermo González; Luis Ahumada			Stadium: Estadio Municipal de Calama

26 June 1977 11	Coquimbo Unido	0-0	Cobreloa	Coquimbo, Chile
				Stadium: Estadio Francisco Sánchez Rumoroso

3 July 1977 12	Cobreloa	4-1	Rangers	Calama, Chile
	Guillermo Yávar; Luis Ahumada (2 goals); Mamfredo González		Luis Fontora	Stadium: Estadio Municipal de Calama; Attendance: 9.000

16 August 1977 13	Malleco Unido	1-1	Cobreloa	Ángol, Chile
	Diaz		Sergio Pérez

17 July 1977 14	Cobreloa	1-0	Deportes Linares	Calama, Chile
	Cristián Sasso			Stadium: Estadio Municipal de Calama

21 August 1977 15	Independiente Cauquenes	2-2	Cobreloa	Cauquenes, Chile
	Romero; Hugo Cárdenas		Sergio Pérez; Luis Ahumada	Stadium: Estadio Municipal de Cauquenes

21 July 1977 16	Cobreloa	2-0	Trasandino	Calama, Chile
	Guillermo Yávar; Luis Ahumada			Stadium: Estadio Municipal de Calama

6 August 1977 17	Magallanes	3-2	Cobreloa	Santiago, Chile
	Juan Lataste; Manuel Baeza; Tejo (Penalty)		Guillermo Yávar (2 goals)	Stadium: Estadio El Bosque

28 August 1977 18	San Luis	3-2	Cobreloa	Quillota, Chile
-	Nuñez; Rubén Rivera; Óscar Villaroel		Guillermo Yávar (Penalty); Sergio Pérez

4 September 1977 19	Cobreloa	1-0	Deportes La Serena	Calama, Chile
	Baudilio Jáuregui			Stadium: Estadio Municipal de Calama

11 September 1977 20	Iberia	1-0	Cobreloa	Los Ángeles, Chile
	Benjamín Muñoz			Stadium: Municipal de Los Ángeles

17 September 1977 21	Cobreloa	4-2	Curicó Unido	Calama, Chile
	Juan Rogelio Nuñez; Gustavo Cuello; Luis Ahumada; Guillermo González		Sánchez; López	Stadium: Estadio Municipal de Calama

25 September 1977 22	Colchagua	0-1	Cobreloa	Colchagua, Chile
			Elmo Aedo

2 October 1977 23	San Antonio	0-2	Cobreloa	San Antonio, Chile
			Julio Correa; Luis Ahumada

9 October 1977 24	Cobreloa	4-1	Naval	Calama, Chile
	Manfredo González; Julio Correa; Guillermo Yávar (2 goals) (1 of penalty)		Juan Valdivia	Stadium: Estadio Municipal de Calama

16 October 1977 25	Unión San Felipe	2-0	Cobreloa	San Felipe, Chile
	Negrete; Hugo Ubeda			Attendance: 4,751

23 October 1977 26	Cobreloa	2-0	Ferroviarios	Calama, Chile
	Francisco Valdés; Juan Rogelio Nuñez			Stadium: Estadio Municipal de Calama

30 October 1977 27	Unión La Calera	1-1	Cobreloa	La Calera, Chile
	Claudio Mena		Francisco Valdés

5 November 1977 28	Cobreloa	0-2	Coquimbo Unido	Calama, Chile
			Claudio Gallegos; Heriberto Rojas	Stadium: Estadio Municipal de Calama

13 November 1977 29	Rangers	2-1	Cobreloa	Talca, Chile
	Luis Fontora; Gabino Román		Francisco Valdés	Stadium: Estadio Fiscal de Talca

20 November 1977 30	Cobreloa	1-1	Malleco Unido	Calama, Chile
	Guillermo Yávar		José Burgos	Stadium: Estadio Municipal de Calama

27 November 1977 31	Deportes Linares	1-0	Cobreloa	Linares, Chile
	Patricio Bonhomme

3 December 1977 32	Cobreloa	4-0	Independiente Cauquenes	Calama, Chile
	Armando Alarcón; Guillermo Yávar; Luis Garisto; Luis Ahumada			Stadium: Estadio Municipal de Calama

11 December 1977 33	Trasandino	0-3	Cobreloa	Los Ándes, Chile
			Juan Rogelio Nuñez; Guillermo Yávar (Penalty); Luis Ahumada

18 December 1977 34	Cobreloa	0-0	Magallanes	Calama, Chile
				Stadium: Estadio Municipal de Calama

The club was able to establish itself in Chile's top flight very quickly, earning promotion after its first season, where they stayed until the 2014–2015 season. Only four years after their foundation, Cobreloa reached the finals of the Copa Libertadores in 1981, losing in a third match to Brazilian club Flamengo. Cobreloa reached the Copa Libertadores final the following year, losing to Peñarol of Uruguay. The club also reached the semi-final of the Copa Libertadores in 1987.

They have competed in the Copa Libertadores de América 13 times, 3 times in the Copa Sudamericana and twice in the Copa CONMEBOL. In 1995 they reached the quarter-finals and the following year were eliminated in the first round. Cobreloa have 8 Primera División titles and 1 Copa Chile title making them the most successful side outside Santiago in Chile and one of the four biggest clubs of the country.

=== Domestic League record ===
Domestic League Chart with each tier division who the team has participated since 1977.

Notes

- In 1977, the team go to primera división de Chile.
- In 2015, the team was relegated to Primera B de Chile.
- In 2023, it is promoted to Chile's first Division.
- In 2024, it descends to the first B in Chile, being the second in its history

== Noche / Tarde Naranja ==
The Noche Naranja or Tarde Naranja is the club's annual official presentation event, where the first team squad, coaching staff, and the new kit are unveiled to the fans at the Zorros del Desierto Stadium. It usually features a preseason friendly against domestic opposition, marking the start of the football season.

=== Results ===
Ed.	Year	Home team	Scores	Away team	Venue
-	2011	(Chile) Cobreloa	0–0	(Chile) Deportes Iquique	Municipal de Calama
-	2012	(Chile) Cobreloa	0–2	(Peru) Alianza Lima (1)	Municipal de Calama
-	2013	(Chile) Cobreloa	2–1	(Chile) Deportes Antofagasta	Zorros del Desierto
-	2016	(Chile) Cobreloa	1–1	(Chile) Deportes Iquique	Zorros del Desierto
-	2017	(Chile) Cobreloa	3–1	(Chile) Deportes Iquique	Zorros del Desierto
-	2018	(Chile) Cobreloa	3–1	(Chile) Deportes Copiapó	Zorros del Desierto
-	2019	(Chile) Cobreloa	1–0	Universidad de Chile	Zorros del Desierto
–	2020	No match			
–	2021	Canceled due to the COVID-19 pandemic			
–	2022	Canceled due to the COVID-19 pandemic			
-	2023	(Chile) Cobreloa	0–0	(Chile) Deportes Antofagasta	Zorros del Desierto
-	2024	(Chile) Cobreloa	2–1	(Chile) Deportes Iquique	Zorros del Desierto
-	2025	(Chile) Cobreloa	2–1	(Chile) Deportes Antofagasta	Zorros del Desierto
–	2026	No match			

== Support ==
In 2019 to get a membership of the club can be by the assistant to the headquarters of the club in Calama in Abaroa street N°1757 or through the online platform in the official website of the institution with previous registration. The necessary documents to get a membership are passport or ID Card and a photo.

The oldest oficial member of the club, is Rodolfo Yáñez Rojas, who is member since the foundation of the institution.

The first official supporters group was created in 1977, called Barra Oficial de Cobreloa by the workers from the El Loa province; Orlando Navarro, Mario Paniagua and José Santos Rodriguez and the support of the club directors.

In 1982, 35 CODELCO workers established the supporters group, Barra Chuquicamata. On this decade was created de group of supporters Mario Soto, tribute to Defense of the club, who dressed the club colors until 1985. They were characterized because they support with musical instruments.

In 1994 was created the supported group, Huracan Naranja, from the Santiago de Chile fans group Vicente Cantatore.

A poll called, Encuesta GFK Adimark, study who is the most popular team on Chile. Cobreloa in 2015 reached the most high value on the poll, with a 1,5% of the total of the population polled. And in the 2018 the lowest value with 0,9%. In both polls the team was the 5th most popular club in country. In Región de Antofagasta the team reach since 2015 until 2019 the 12,752% of preference of the population.

Supporters of Cobreloa distribuided in Chile by GFK Adimark
Year	Antogagasta	Arica y Parinacota	Tarapacá	Coquimbo	Valparaíso	Metropolitana	Maule	Bío Bío	Los Lagos	Araucanía	Aisen	Source
2015	14	0	0	0	0	0	0	0	0	0	0	
2016	31	4	2	7	6	12	2	13	2	0	0	
2017	37	0	10	0	0	2	0	0	0	8	2	
2018	14	0	0	0	0	0	0	0	0	4	0	
2019	37	0	0	0	0	0	0	0	0	0	0	
The data has been collected according to the percentages by region shown in each survey translated in person surveyed.

The Cobreloa supporters, specifically the CODELCO workers, are known for having donated a day of their salary to contribute to pay the signing pass of the defender Mario Soto.

== Colours, badge and symbols ==
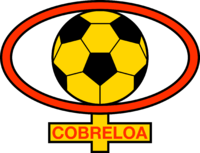
The left was the badge of the club since 1979 to 1995, and second one on the right is the actual badge made in 2013.

The first badge was created by Enrique Escala, The original badge was inspired in the logotype of the Chilean Company who administered the first years of the club, Corporation del Cobre, which in turn take the inspiration in the planetary symbol of venus, whom metal represent the copper, the main recourse from El Loa to the country. Over the CODELCO logotype specifically a sphere, who in the institution badge is replaced by a traditional football ball with yellow and black casings, and the name of the club in the horizontal line of the badge in an orange color.

Through the years the badge has had some modifications: from 1995 to 2000, the badge was changed to entirely orange with the letters of the name of the club in white; from 2000 to 2005, a ribbon with "Cobreloa" was added over the upper part of the badge, and, to the lower part, "Calama" was added, referring to the homeground of the team, as well as a white outline around the badge, with the color of this badge being more of a dark orange; from 2005 to 2012, the white outline was replaced by a black one, and the upper ribbon was united with the main body of the badge; from 2012 to 2013, the design was 'simplified' and the football on the badge was bigger, touching the borders of the inner body, and the orange color was brighter; and from 2013 to the present eight stars were added to represent the eight national titles won by the club, with the football being centred inside.

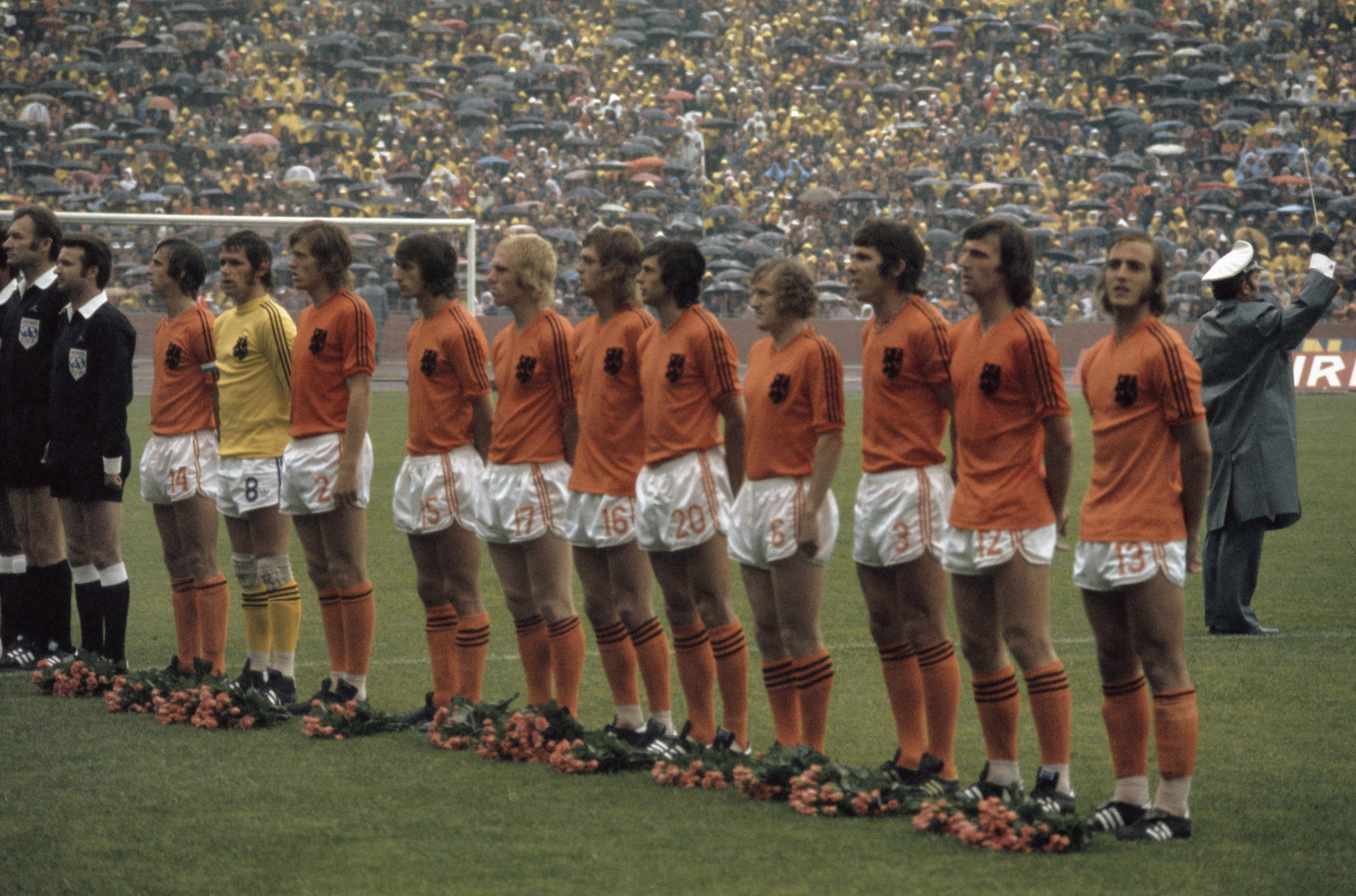
The traditional color of the team was inspired in Netherlands National Football Team in the 70's according to the former president, José Gorrini.

The traditional color of Cobreloa is orange, according to president, José Gorrini, the color of the club was selected due to give tribute to Netherlands National Football Team, in the 70's this selection was very popular by players like Johan Cruyff. Also, by commercial reasons this color was selected due obtain travel discounts in the national airline, Ladeco (Línea aérea del Cobre), whose corporative color was orange. The idea for this was thanks to engineer of CODELCO Chuquicamata, Peter Kiefkoff, who accepted the task of managing the club's finances, on the condition that the club would wear the colors of his native country's team.

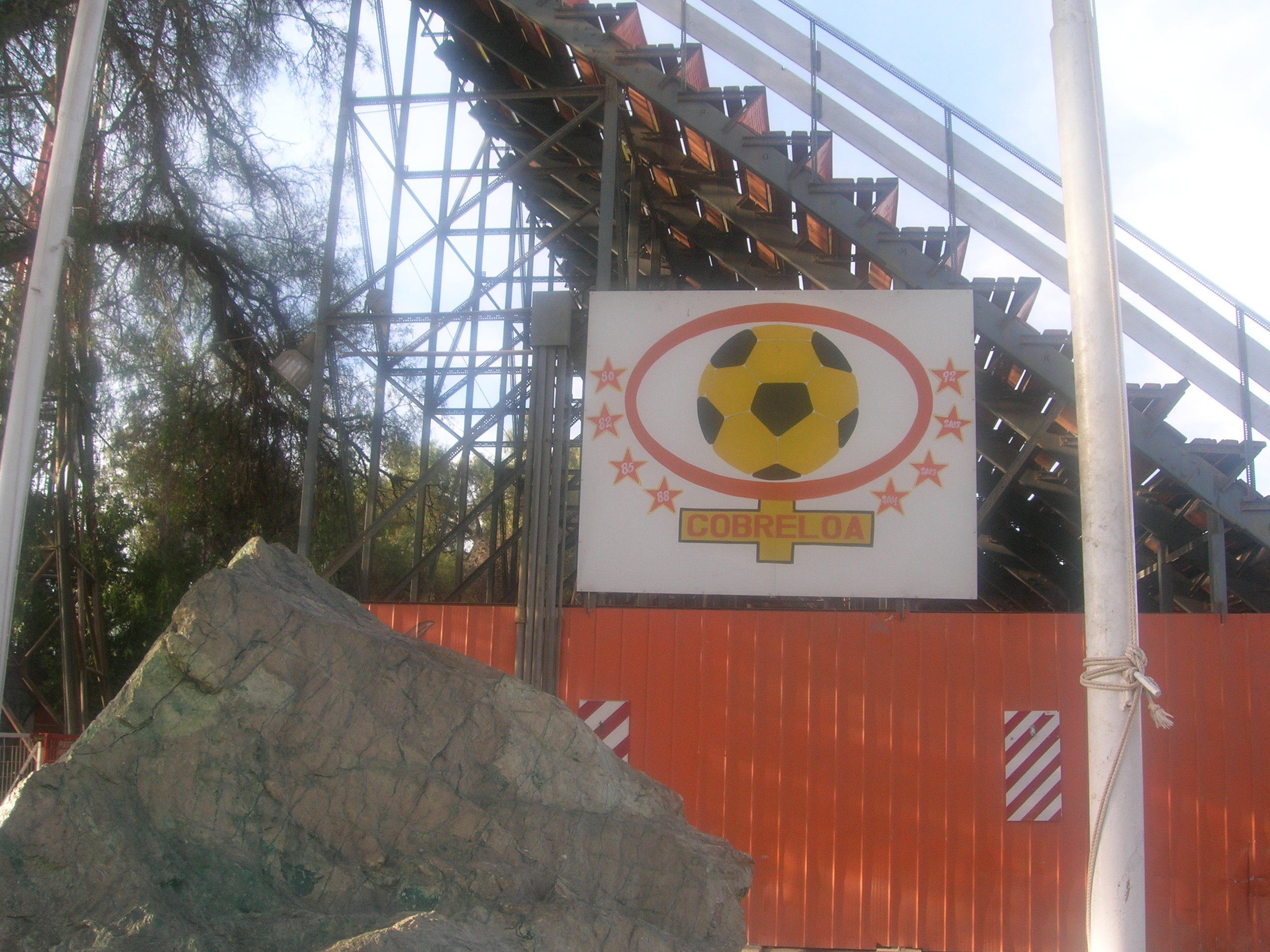
A painting inside the Municipal de Calama of badge of the club with the eight titles won ultil 2004.

The first Cobreloa kit was red shirt and white shorts, due to lack of clothing, improvised in February 1977 for Copa Chile, facing Regional Antofagasta. In 2024, this jersey was released in a limited commercial edition to commemorate the club's first kit. Since 1977 the classical kit of the team is full orange, with some modifications, like 1992–93 season with white shorts, in 2009–10 the official kit was change with white socks. The away kit has been mostly full white, until 2001–2006 year it changed by color black, also in 2013–15 and 2017–18 seasons alternating with white color during those years.

The first brand who was clothing the team was Chilean Sport brand 'Haddad', located in Santiago de Chile, due the international brands was not interested in clothing the team, aside the calama brands who was interested. However, there was a moment who the team directors was decided to change the atire to the Chilean brand, 'Kotting'. Finally 'Haddad' was the first brand to dress to team, who was participated on Segunda División.

In 1978, the team participated on Primera División de Chile, hence the team change of sport brand, to the Mario Soto sports brand, called 'MyS'. Part of the player contract. In 1981, the team changed the sport brand to the Chilean brand 'New Lider' to participate in its first international competition, while 'MyS' continued to give the training clothes until 1981.

In 1982, the club sings with the Germany sport brand, Adidas, presented in the final of Copa Libertadores of this year, versus Peñarol of Uruguay.

The first commemorative shirt of the club was in 2007, with Spanish sportswear company, Kelme. That attire was a special logo on them. In December 2016, the sportswear company, Macron, announced for sale a commemorative shirt to celebrate 40 years of the club; the design was similar to the 1980s kits style.

On 4 February 2019, was shown its first third kit in Cobreloa, being the black the color that was elected due to the popular choice of the club fans.

Y en los triunfos y derrotas, gladiador tu frente noble
mostradas con tu hinchada gran devota,
donde jueges por amor te seguirá,
por el cobre y su gran mineral.

Part of the First Hymn of Cobreloa
Alejandro Álvarez Vargas.

The first anthem of the club was written and composed by the musician and writer, Alejandro Álvarez Vargas—the winning contestant from a contest advertised through the local radio station

One of the most important aspects of the team's idiosyncrasy is the siren that sounds when the team begins to execute an attacking play in the opponent's area. Librarian Fabiana Rosales attributes this idea to the idea of a CODELCO worker known as Negro Pinto and his coworkers. She says they boldly took over the stadium's northwest lighting tower to install a siren with an 80-meter cable, connecting it to a push-button panel under the seat. This would function as a sort of "goal alarm." The sound was identical to the one they heard when an overhead crane was put into motion or the concentrator at the Chuquicamata mine was started up.

The club's first mascot was inspired by the events of a Chuquicamata resident named Gerónimo Dominguez, who met the club at age 12. During the team's development into professional football, his brother-in-law, while doing his military service in Conchi, found a fox cub, which he took to Calama and ended up giving to Dominguez, who decided to raise it as a domestic dog. One day they decided to take it to the stadium. The squad liked it, and a relationship was formed between Gerónimo, the fox, and the team, who decided to make it their mascot. The fox's first appearance as such was during a match against Santiago Morning, around 8:00 p.m., entering the stadium with it and parading it around the field. The second time, it came dressed in a salmon-colored baby suit. Gerónimo performed this performance throughout the season. Due to the animal's natural behavior, eating livestock and causing problems for not being domesticated, the family decided to set it free. The fox, trying to return to the family home, was struck by a vehicle and killed.

This incident caused a stir in the community, and a cartoon fox named "Loíto" was designed, the brainchild of journalist Alfredo Llewellyn Bustos. The mascot was designed by director René Vásquez Rodríguez. The mascot first appeared in a club brochure for membership recruitment and also in the local newspaper "El Mercurio de Calama" in 1977, to follow the team's weekly activities.

Traditional color of the team	1992–93 years	2009 kit

=== Kit suppliers and shirt sponsors ===
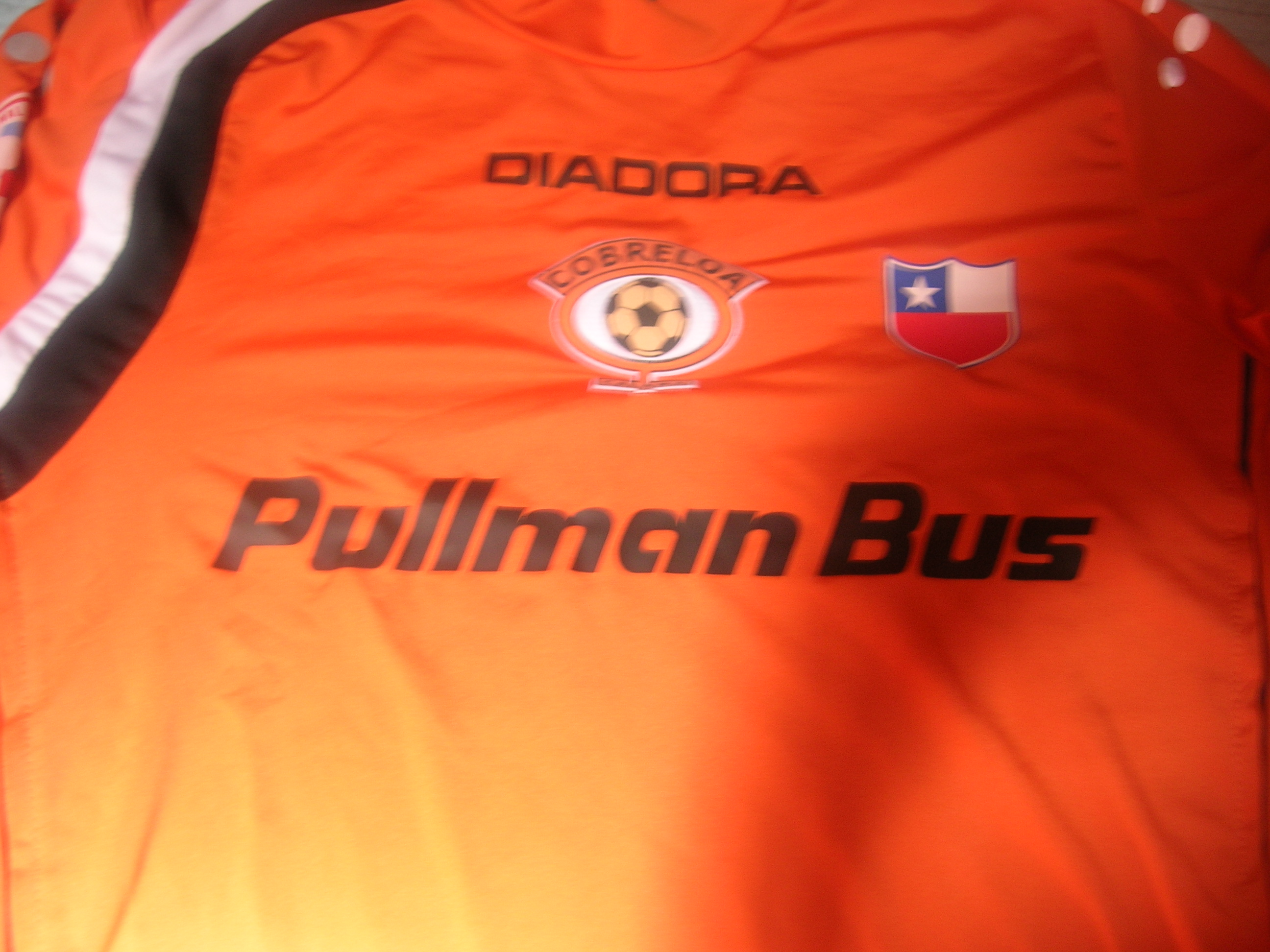
Team Kit from 2005-to 2019

Period	Kit supplier	Shirt main sponsor	Notes
1977	Haddad and Kotting	None	This were the first Sporting brand on dress the institution.
1978-1980	MyS'	None	This Chilean brand was founded by Mario Soto, who was player of the club. As part of his contract this brand must dress the team.
1981	New Lider	None	Due the contract with Mario Soto continued, the institution signed with a new brand, but the training clothes was Still MyS' brand.
1982	Adidas	None	Was the first international brand on dress the club.
1983 -1985	Adidas	Isapre Chuquicamata	
1986	Penalty	TECSA	This was the first company not directly linked to CODELCO to sponsor the team.
1987	Penalty	Isapre Chuquicamata	
1988–1991	Adidas	None	
1992	Reusch	Isapre Chuquicamata	
1993–1994	Adidas	Cristal	
1995	Uhlsports	Cristal	
1996–1997	Puma	Cristal	
1998	Le Coq Sportif	Cristal	
1999	Kelme	Cristal	
2000–2001	Adidas	Cristal	In 2000, the first third kit of the team, with black colors was added.
2002	Adidas	Sky	
2003–2004	Adidas	Turbus	
2005	Diadora	Pullman Bus	
2006	Diadora	None	
2007	Kelme	Lider Presto	First Commemorative kit to celebrate 30 years of the club.
2008	Garcis	Hino	
2008	Lotto	Hino	
2009	Lotto	Nissan	
2010	Mitre	Pal Airlines	
2011	Mitre	Finning CAT	
2012–2015	Lotto	Finning CAT	
2015–2021	Macron	Finning CAT	In 2017, the 40-year commemorative shirt in special format was made available for sale.
2022–2024	KS7	Finning CAT	In 2023, the 46-year commemorative shirt, was made available for sale.; In 2023, the company will produce a special jersey in purple, black, and white, alluding to the bluish mineral extracted in mining.; In 2024, the company will produce a special jersey in shades of gold and black.; In 2024, the company will make a pink and white jersey commemorating Breast Cancer Awareness Month.
2025	Siker	SOBEK Ingenieros	* The company created a special 2024 jersey, commemorating the first jersey the team wore in its debut season as a professional.
2026	Siker	Minera El Abra	* The company created a special 2026 jersey.
Notes	Main Reference		

=== Kit deals ===
Kit supplier	Period	Contract announcement	Contract duration	Notes
Macron	2015–2018	15 January 2015	June 2015 – August 2018 (3 years)	
Macron	2018–2021	10 August 2018	August 2018 – January 2021 (2,5 years)	
KS7	2021–2023	17 December 2021	December 2021 – November 2023 (2 years)	
KS7	2023–2024	17 November 2023	17 November 2023 – 29 November 2024 (1 year)	The club put ends to this contract.
Siker	2024-2025	29 November 2024	November 2024 – 2025 (1 year)	The club purpose one year of contract with the clothing company.

== Stadiums ==
Estadio "Zorros del Desierto" de Calama
- The Orange Hell
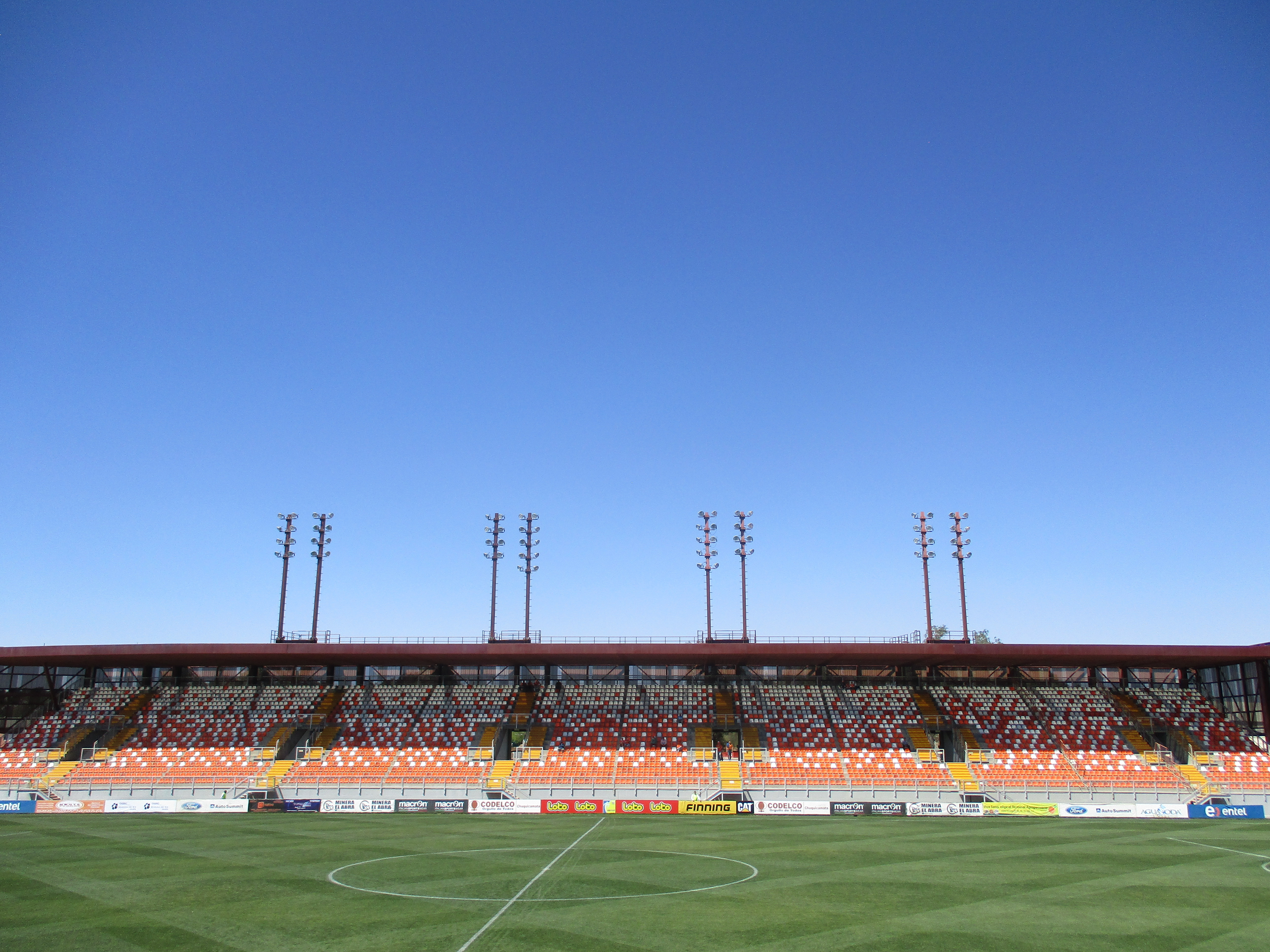
- Location: Matta Avenue, no Number, Calama, Chile
- Owner: Municipality of Calama
- Operator: Municipality of Calama
- Capacity: 12,346 seats

Construction
- Groundbreaking: 3 February 2013
- Opened: 12 November 1952
- Renovated: 18 April 2015
- Cost: US$ 8.66 million
- Architects: Gerardo Marambio Cortés; Claudio Aceituno Husch; Patricia Vidal Aguayo

Tenants
- Club de Deportes Cobreloa; Deportes Iquique

Since 1977 the first home ground of the club was the Estadio Municipal de Calama, who played the national league and internationals Cups matches until 27 January 2013. The last match that was played by the team in this stadium was against Colo-Colo, the team won 5–2.

For the two finals of Copa Libertadores the team played in the Estadio Nacional de Chile, in 1981 and 1982, against Clube de Regatas do Flamengo and Club Atletico Peñarol respectively.

In February 2013 due to the renovation of the Stadium, the team had to play in another's home ground, the first stadium at which it was elected to play was the Parque Estadio Juan López located in Antofagasta. For the first class matches the stadium elected was the Tierra de Campeones on Iquique, where Club de Deportes Universidad Católica plays.

The complaints of the team about the infrastructure of the stadium Juan López, the directing of the club made negotiations with the Municipality of Antofagasta to play in the Stadium Calvo y Bascuñan, in this homeground the team played the Copa Sudamericana matches, with Club Atletico Peñarol and Club Deportivo La Equidad and local first Class matches of the Local League for the rest of the year.

From June of this year, the main stadium at which the team played mostly the national league, in the recently inaugurated stadium Estadio Luis Becerra Constanzo, formerly called Estadio la Madriguera de Calama in Calama, the team inaugurated the home ground in a Copa Chile match against Club de Deportes Cobresal.

Since 2015, the team plays in the stadium Zorros del Desierto of Calama. The first match was against Club de Deportes Antofagasta. The team plays the local competitions like the Primera B de Chile and Copa Chile.

== Honours ==
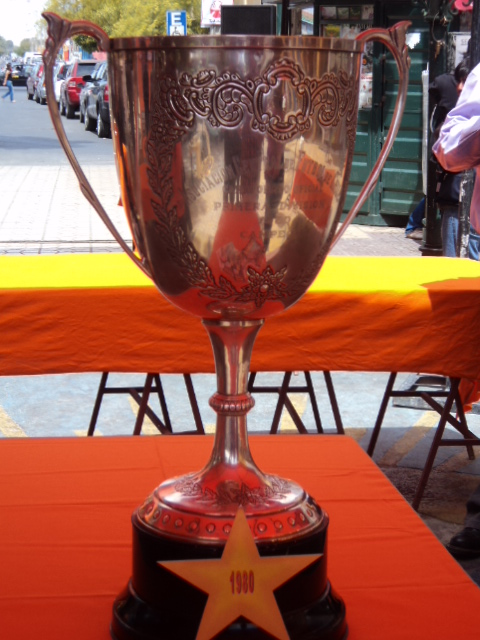
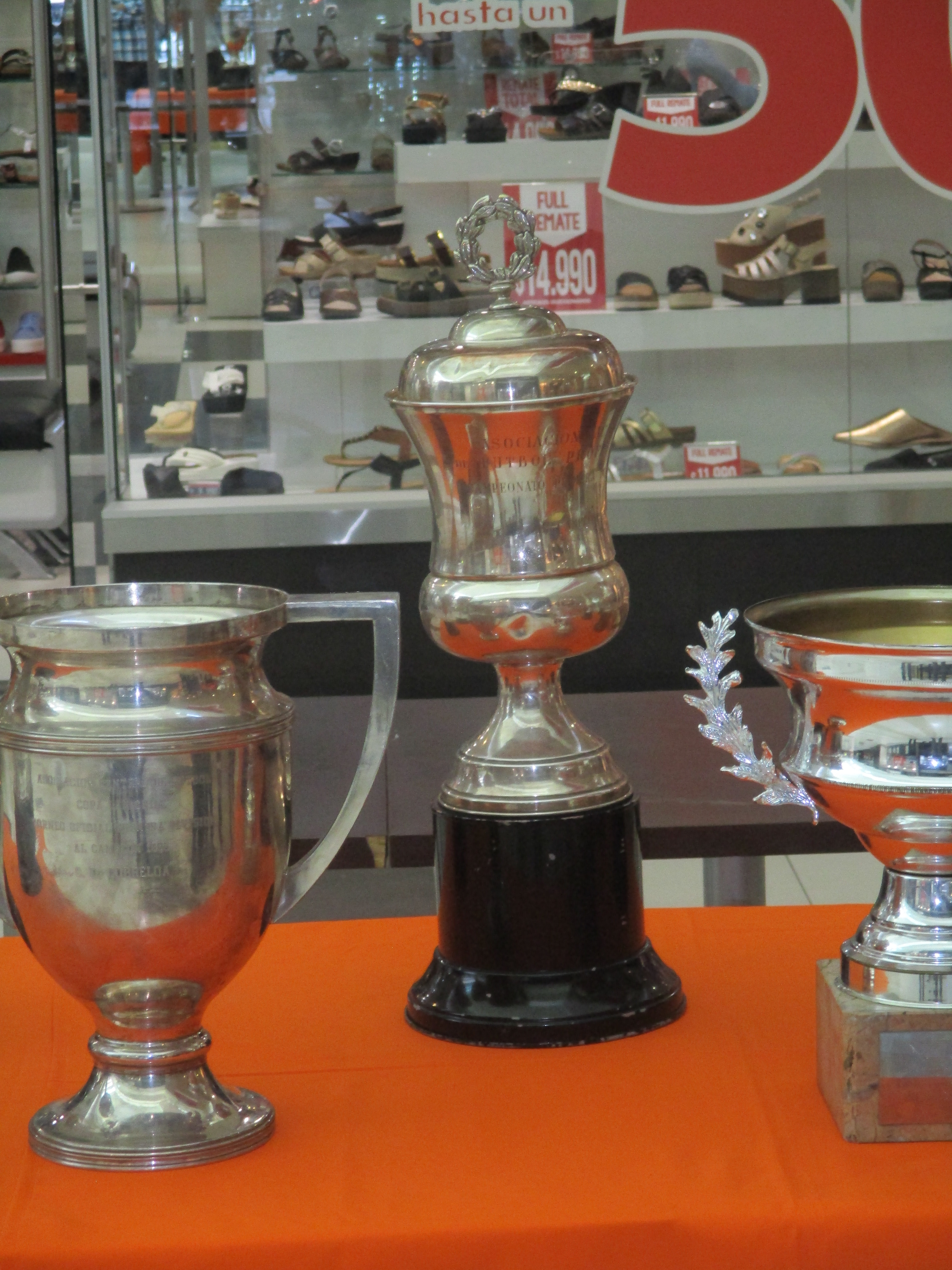
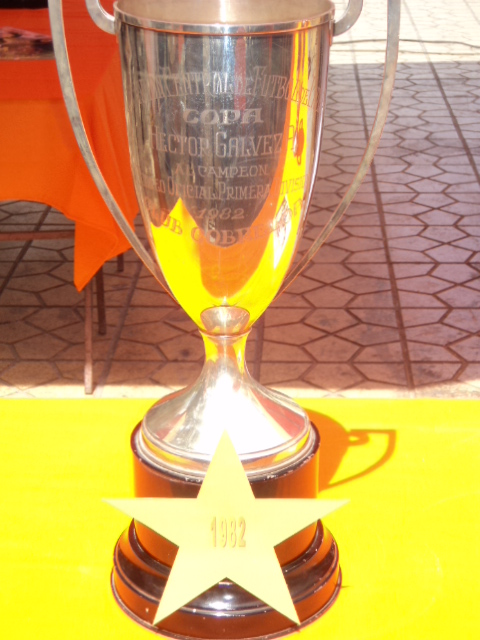
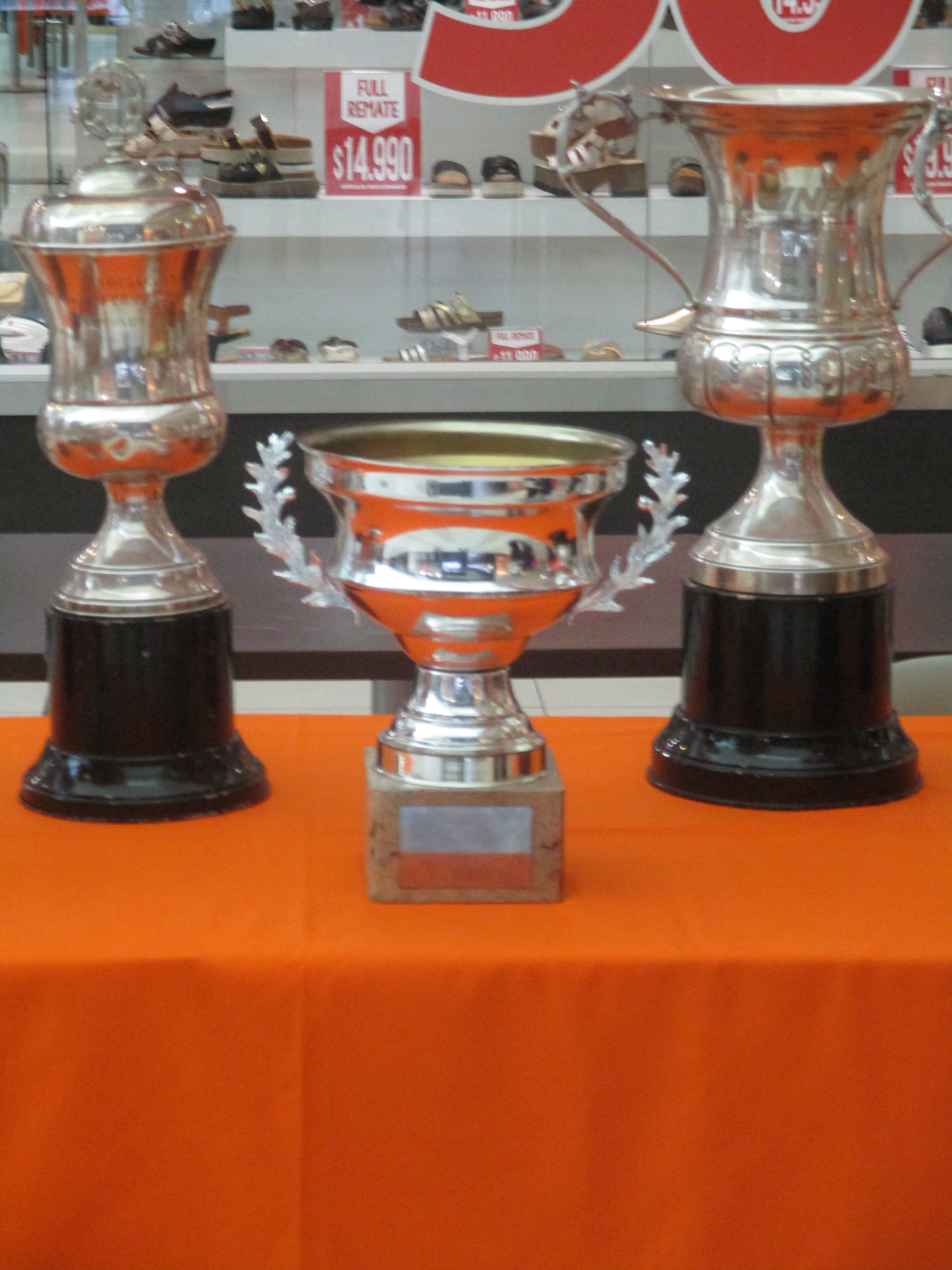
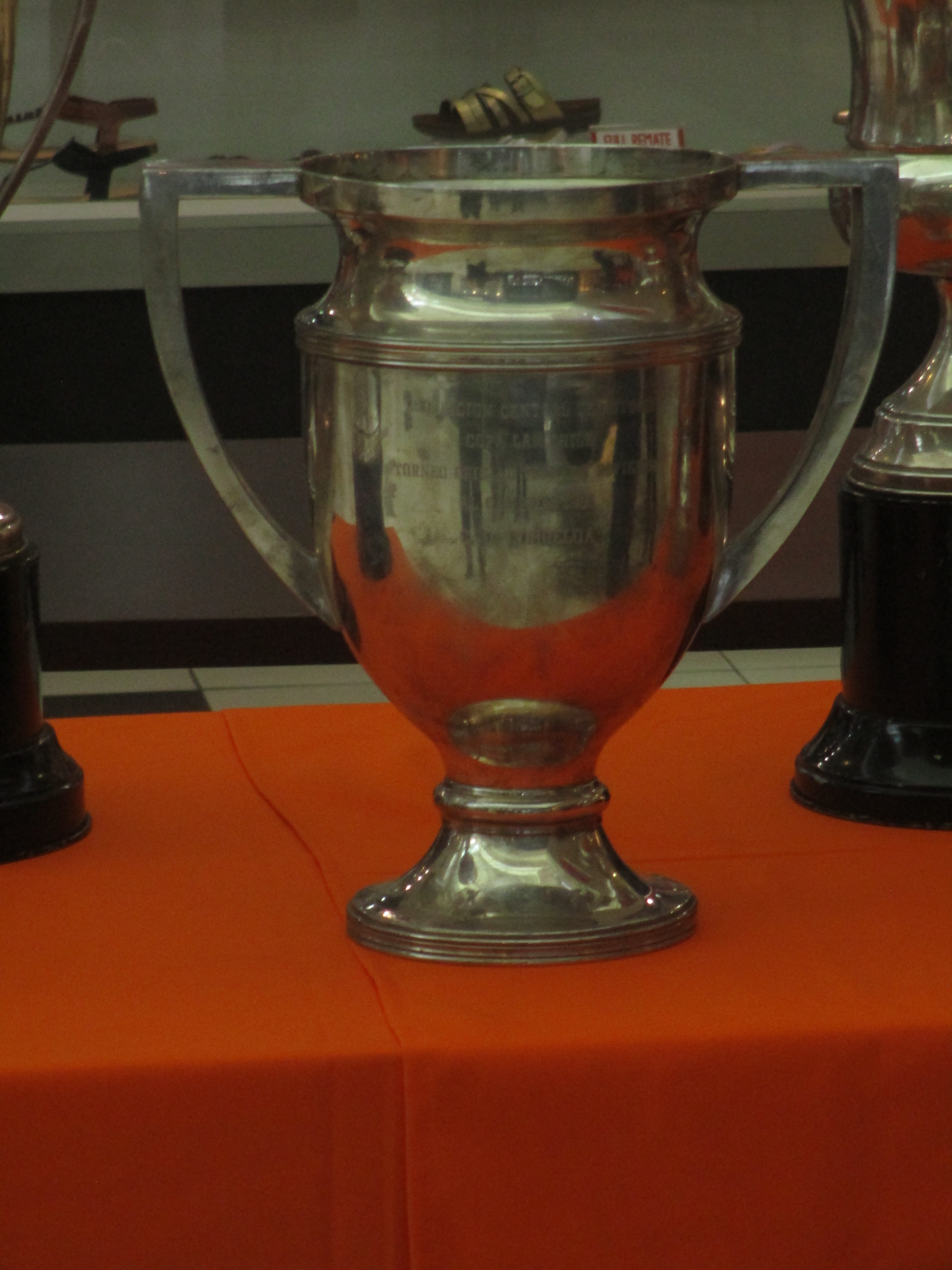
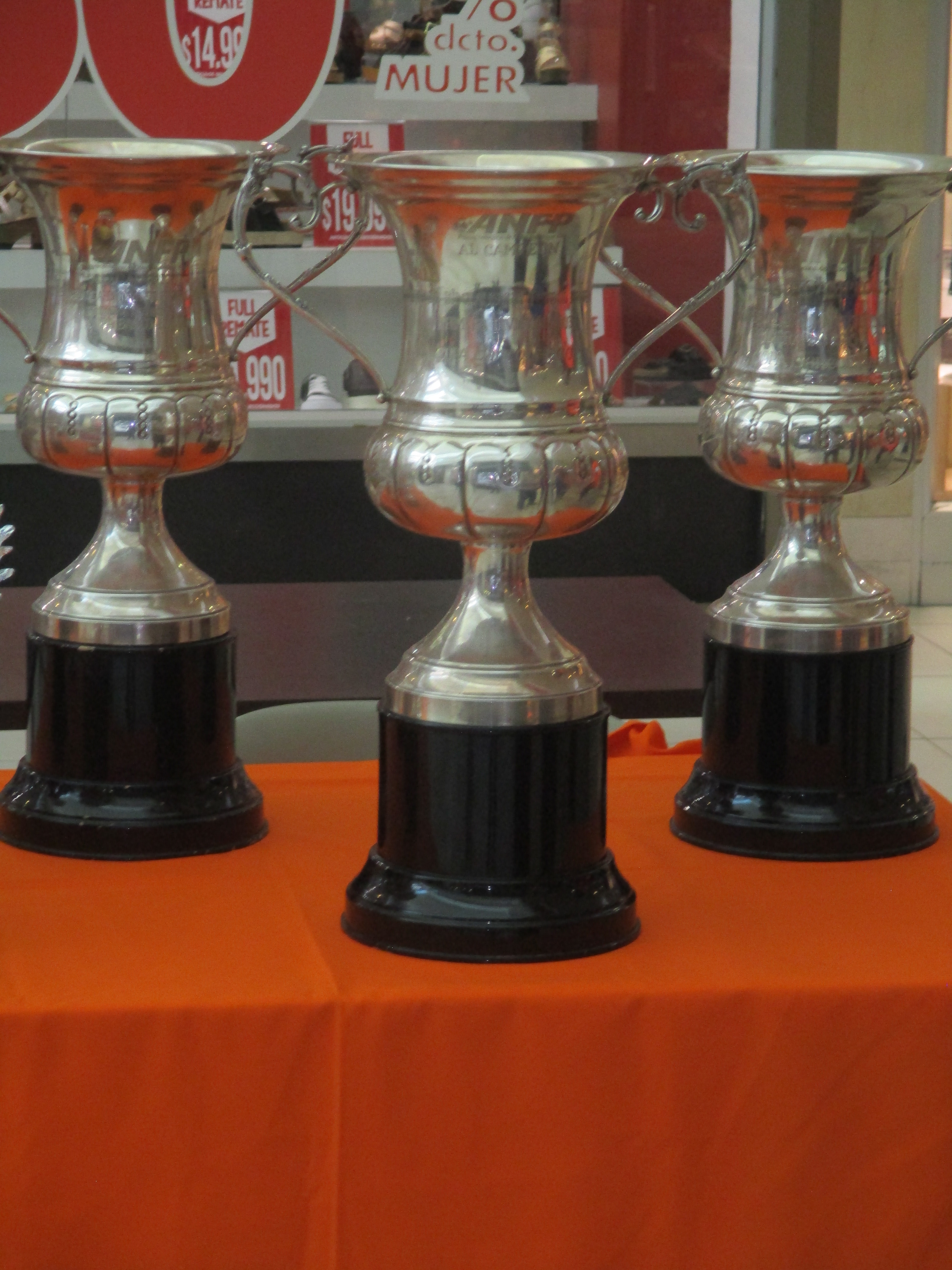
Primera División Trophies the team won through its history.

=== National ===
- Primera División
  - Winners (8): 1980, 1982, 1985, 1988, 1992, 2003-A, 2003-C, 2004-C
- Copa Chile
  - Winners (1): 1986
- Primera B de Chile
  - Winners (1): 2023

=== International ===
- Copa Libertadores de América
  - Runners-up (2): 1981, 1982

== Records ==
Hector Puebla holds the most appearances with the club with 663 and holds the most appearances in domestics leagues with 457, on 16 years in the team (1980–1996), also, is the player with most titles with the club with 5 domestic leagues (1980, 1982, 1985, 1988, 1992) and the 1986 national Cup.

Juan Covarrubias is the all-time goalscorer for the team, with 147, and the top goalscorer in domestics leagues with 105 goals. He won with the team the domestics titles in 1988 and 1992.

The higher transfer fee on Chile was Eduardo Vargas transfer to the Universidad de Chile, for US$1.365 million.

This institution owns the fifth local unbeaten streak of the world, which extended from 22 December 1980 until 22 September 1985, with a total of 91 matches without loss in Calama for domestic matches.

- Club records
  - Largest victory: 10–0 (v. O'Higgins in the Copa Chile, 1979)
  - Largest Primera División victory: 9–0 (v. Regional Atacama in 1983)
  - Heaviest Primera División defeat: 1–6 (v. Huachipato in 1998)
- Individual records
  - Most league goals in a single season: 42 (Patricio Galaz in 2004)
  - Most league goals in total: 104 (Juan Covarrubias)
  - Most goals in total: 144 (Juan Covarrubias)
  - Most Primera División appearances: 446 (Héctor Puebla from 1980 to 1996)
  - Most appearances in total: 662 (Héctor Puebla from 1980 to 1996)

=== Primera División top scorers ===
Year	Player	Goals
1982	Jorge Luis Siviero	18
1983	Washington Olivera	29
1993	Marco Antonio Figueroa	18
Apertura 2004	Patricio Galaz	23
Clausura 2004	Patricio Galaz	19

=== Copa Chile top scorers ===
Year	Player	Goals
1982	Jorge Luis Siviero	8
1986	Juan Carlos Letelier	11
1990	Adrián Czornomaz	13
1994	Alejandro Glaría	12

== Players ==
=== Current squad ===
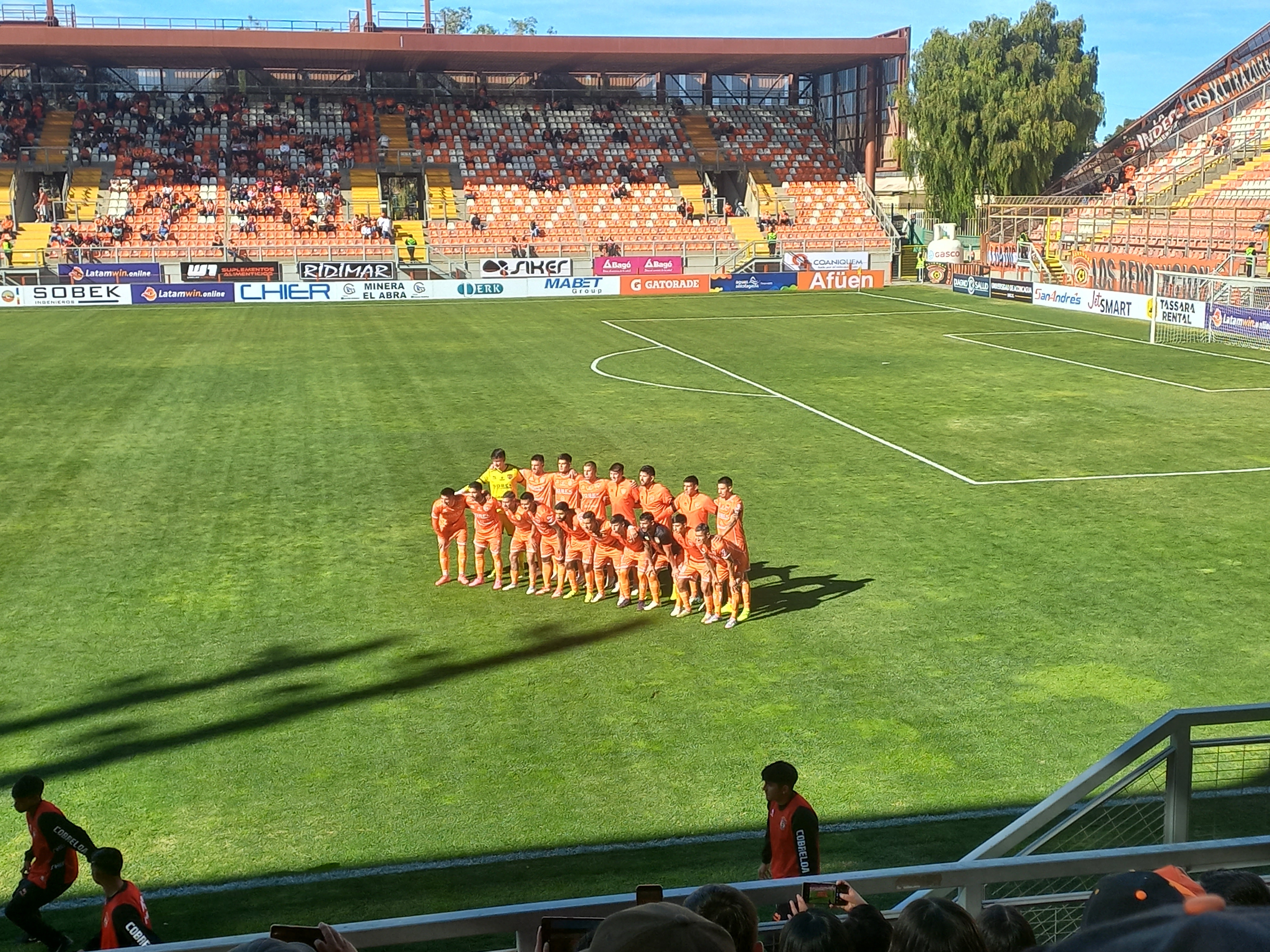
Club de Deportes Cobreloa players before a Primera B de Chile match in 2025.

Current squad of Cobreloa as of 1 July 2026 (edit)
Sources: Cobreloa Official Web Site

No.		Position	Player
1	CHI	GK	Hugo Araya
3	CHI	DF	Youssef González
4	CHI	DF	Bastián San Juan
5	CHI	DF	Rodolfo González
6	CHI	DF	Matías Tapia
7	CHI	MF	Sebastián Zúñiga
8	CHI	DF	Lucas Cornejo
9	CHI	FW	Vicente Conelli (loan from Huachipato)
10	ARG	FW	Cristian Insaurralde
11	ARG	FW	Gustavo Gotti (c)
12	CHI	GK	Cristian Alarcón
13	CHI	FW	Agustín Quezada
14	CHI	MF	Tomás Aránguiz
15	CHI	DF	Diego García
16	CHI	FW	Bastián Garrido
17	CHI	DF	David Tapia
18	CHI	DF	Joaquín Méndez

No.		Position	Player
19	CHI	FW	Yastin Navarro
20	CHI	MF	Francisco Matamoros
21	URU	MF	Cristian Muga
22	CHI	FW	Álvaro Delgado
24	CHI	DF	Robinson Porras
25	CHI	MF	Vicente Roco
27	ARG	FW	Matías Sandoval
28	CHI	DF	Felipe Fritz
29	CHI	MF	Jorge Gatica
30	CHI	GK	Diego Tapia
31	CHI	FW	Esteban Gallardo
32	ARG	MF	Facundo Velazco
34	CHI	FW	Camilo Orellana
35	CHI	MF	Lucas Wastavino
36	CHI	FW	Luciano Gallardo
37	ARG	FW	Juan Ignacio Duma
38	CHI	DF	Felipe Saavedra

Manager: Mario Salas

=== 2026 Summer transfers ===
==== In ====
Note: Flags indicate national team as defined under FIFA eligibility rules; some limited exceptions apply. Players may hold more than one non-FIFA nationality.

No.	Pos.	Nation	Player
--	MF	CHI	Jorge Gatica (from Santiago Wanderers)
--	MF	CHI	Tomás Aránguiz (from Deportes Magallanes)
--	DF	CHI	Bastián San Juan (from Rangers de Talca)
--	DF	CHI	Felipe Fritz (Deportes Limache)
--	MF	ARG	Facundo Velazco (from San Marcos de Arica)
--	GK	CHI	Diego Tapia (from Ñublense)
--	FW	ARG	Matías Sandoval (from Rangers de Talca)
--	DF	CHI	Diego Garcia (Everton de Viña del Mar)
--	FW	CHI	Vicente Conelli (from Huachipato FC)
--	FW	ARG	Cristian Insaurralde (Return of loan from Unión Española)

==== Out ====
Note: Flags indicate national team as defined under FIFA eligibility rules; some limited exceptions apply. Players may hold more than one non-FIFA nationality.

No.	Pos.	Nation	Player
--	MF	CHI	Bryan Ogáz (to Universidad de Concepción)
--	MF	CHI	Iván Ledezma (to Deportes Copiapó)
--	DF	CHI	Nicolás Palma (to Unión La Calera)
--	FW	CHI	Luis García (to Unión San Felipe)
--	FW	CHI	Bastián Valdés (to Brujas de Salamanca)
--	MF	CHI	Byron Bustamante (to General Velásquez)
--	MF	CHI	Diego Acevedo (to Deportes Santa Cruz)
--	DF	CHI	Ronald Guzmán (to Curicó Unido)
--	DF	CHI	Hugo Rojo (to Brujas de Salamanca)
--	GK	CHI	Álvaro Salazar (to Deportes Recoleta)
--	FW	ARG	Leandro Barrera (to San Martín de Mendoza)
--	MF	CHI	Gerardo Navarrete (to Lota Schwager)

No.	Pos.	Nation	Player
--	MF	CHI	Javier Meléndez (to Brujas de Salamanca)
--	DF	CHI	Jorge Espejo Leppe (Loan to Universidad de Concepción)
--	DF	CHI	Patricio Romero (Loan to Universidad de Concepción)
--	FW	CHI	Walter Ponce (Released)
--	MF	CHI	Gabriel Rojas (Released)
--	MF	CHI	Ed Verhoeven (Released)
--	MF	CHI	Aldrix Jara (to Deportes Concepción)
--	FW	CHI	Alex Valdés (back to Ñublense)
--	MF	CHI	Branco Provoste (Deportes Recoleta)
--	DF	ARG	Agustín Heredia (Back to Boca Juniors)
--	FW	CHI	César Huanca (to Deportes Temuco)
--	DF	CHI	Bastián Tapia (Deportes Antofagasta)

=== Managerial and technical staff ===
As of 26 April 2026

Head coach	(Chile) César Bravo Castillo
Assistant coaches	(Chile) Víctor González Cortés
Assistant coaches	(Chile) Juan Pablo Toro Jara
Goalkeeping coach	(Chile) Gonzalo Martínez
Head of fitness	(Chile) Rodrigo Melgarejo
Medics	(Chile) Sergio Silva Oporto
Medics	(Chile) Carlos Dolezal Lorca
Kiniesiologists	(Chile) Santiago Rojas Sextón
Kiniesiologists	(Chile) Hugo Chacón Castillo
Paramedic	(Chile) Juan Herrera Araya
Utilities	(Chile) Gonzalo Calderón Calderón
Utilities	(Chile) Dilan Muñoz
Audiovisual Analyst	(Chile) Luis Valero

Source: En La Línea Deportes - Con renovada ilusión Cobreloa comienza hoy la pretemporada en Calama (Spanish)

== Management ==
The club is managed by Sociedad Anonima Deportiva Profesional (Professional Sports Corporation) format in Chile, through the Chilean law, N° 20.019 relativa a las Organizaciones Deportivas Profesionales (Related to Professional Sports Organizations). This law allows to organize, produce, marketing and participate in professional sports activities in the country.

On 2 October 2017, the club made an extraordinary assembly with the members of the club, the assistance of these with suffrage right was of 86. The purpose was to reform the statute regime of the club in that moment. This renewed statutes lay down the official address of the club, Calama, the indefinite length time of the directory and the unlimited number of member who could be owns.

This statute alludes the principles and objectives of the institution, the rights and duties of the members, the heritage and the administration, the members general assemblies, the directory, the duties of the directors of the corporation, subsidiaries of the club and the rules of this.

=== Board of directors ===
Office	Name
President	Harry Robledo Cortés
Vice president	Ignacio Mehech Castallón
Secretary	Wladimir Tito Trigo
Treasurer	César Jiménez Molina
Director	Claudio Paredes Trigo
Director	Chariff Moreno Fajardín
Director	Alejandra Ramos Rojo
Director	Willian Selti Carrasco

Source: Memoria Anual Cobreloa 2024 (Spanish)

=== Organizational Chart ===
Strategic Level

		Directors President
	Vice-President
Finance Committee	Youth Academies	Woman division	Football Commission	Communications area	Media Relations

Operational and tactic Level

General Manager
Administration and finance	Accountancy	Sporting Director	Marketing Director	Operations and Logistics
Accountant	Accounting assistant	Coordinators	Operations	Operational Command	Sport Complex
stocktaking	Coordinators
Human resources
Budget	Management Staff of first team	Management Staff of Women's team	Management Staff of Youth Teams
'Socios' and subscribers
Commercial Unit	Press	Digital Marketing	Partnership and Campaigns

Administration

Office	Name
Directors President	Harry Robledo Cortés
Sports Director	Mauricio Pozo Quinteros

== Coaches ==
Interim coaches appear in italics.

- (Chile) Andrés Prieto (1977–1979)
- (Argentina) (Chile) Vicente Cantatore (1980–1984)
- (Chile) Jorge Toro (1985)
- (Uruguay) Jorge Luis Siviero (1986–1988)
- (Chile) Miguel Hermosilla (1988–1989)
- (Chile) Gustavo Cuello (1989)
- (Chile) Andrés Prieto (1989–1990)
- (Argentina) (Chile) Fernando Cavallieri (1991–1992)
- (Chile) Mario Osbén (1992)
- (Chile) José Sulantay (1992–1993)
- (Chile) Jorge Garcés (1994–1995)
- (Chile) Miguel Hermosilla (1995–1996)
- (Chile) Carlos Rojas (1997–1998)
- (Chile) Mario Herrera (1998)
- (Chile) Arturo Salah (1999–2000)
- (Chile) Carlos Rojas (2000)
- (Argentina) Oscar Malbernat (2000–2001)
- (Chile) Víctor Merello (2001–2002)
- (Uruguay) (Chile) Nelson Acosta (2002–2003)
- (Chile) Gilberto Reyes (2003)
- (Chile) Eduardo Fournier (2003)
- (Uruguay) Luis Garisto (2003)
- (Chile) Fernando Díaz (2004)
- (Chile) Miguel Hermosilla (2004)
- (Uruguay) (Chile) Nelson Acosta (2004–2005)
- (Chile) Jorge Socías (2005)
- (Chile) Eduardo Fournier (2005)
- (Chile) Miguel Hermosilla (2005)
- (Chile) Jorge Aravena (2006)
- (Chile) Gustavo Huerta (2007)
- (Paraguay) Gustavo Benítez (2008)
- (Chile) Rubén Vallejos (2008)
- (Chile) Marco Antonio Figueroa (2008)
- (Argentina) Marcelo Trobbiani (2009)
- (Chile) Rubén Vallejos (2009)
- (Chile) Germán Cornejo (2009)
- (Chile) Raúl Toro (2009–2010)
- (Chile) Germán Cornejo (2010)
- (Chile) Mario Soto (2010)
- (Uruguay) (Chile) Nelson Acosta (2011–2012)
- (Chile) Roberto Spicto (2012)
- (Argentina) Javier Torrente (2012)
- (Chile) Marco Antonio Figueroa (2013)
- (Chile) Jorge García (2013–2014)
- (Chile) César Bravo (2014)
- (Argentina) Marcelo Trobbiani (2014)
- (Argentina) Pablo Trobbiani (2014)
- (Chile) Fernando Vergara (2014)
- (Chile) Marco Antonio Figueroa (2015)
- (Argentina) César Vigevani (2015–2016)
- (Chile) César Bravo (2016)
- (Chile) Carlos Rojas (2016)
- (Chile) César Bravo (2016)
- (Chile) Rodrigo Meléndez (2016)
- (Chile) José Sulantay (2017)
- (Chile) Rodrigo Pérez (2018)
- (Chile) Rodrigo Meléndez (2018)
- (Chile) Víctor Rivero (2019)
- (Chile) Marco Antonio Figueroa (2020)
- (Chile) Nelson Soto (2020–2021)
- (Chile) Rodrigo Meléndez (2021)
- (Argentina) Héctor Almandoz (2021)
- (Chile) Emiliano Astorga (2022–2024)
- (Chile) Nelson Soto (2024)
- (Argentina) Dalcio Giovagnoli (2024)
- (Chile) César Bravo (2024-2026)
- (Chile) Mario Salas (2026-)

== Presidents ==
Cobreloa presidents from 1977 to present:

- Francisco Núñez Venegas (1977)
- Esteban Ibáñez (1978)
- José Gorrini Sanguinetti (1978)
- Sergio Stoppel García (1978–1982)
- Luis Gómez Araya (1983–1987)
- Sergio Stoppel García (1987–1988)
- Pedro Cortés Navia (1989–1991)
- Luís Urrutia Concha (1991–1992)
- Orlando Álvarez Campos (1992–1993)
- Sergio Jarpa Gibert (1993–1998)
- Pedro Pablo Latorre Muñoz (1998–1999)
- Heriberto Pinto García (1999–2003)
- Gerardo Mella Fernández (2003–2006)
- Augusto González Aguirre (2006–2007)
- Juan Jorge Jorge (2007–2010)
- Javier Maureira Alfaro (2010–2012)
- Mario Herrera Pinto (2012–2014)
- Jorge Pereira (2014)
- Augusto González Aguirre (2014–2015)
- Gerardo Mella Fernández (2015–2017)
- Walter Aguilera (2017–2021)
- Duncan Araya (2021)
- Luís Vera (2021)
- Fernando Ramírez (2022–2023)
- Marcelo Pérez García (2023–2024)
- Harry Robledo Cortés (2024-Act.)

== Sources ==
=== Books ===
- (in Spanish) Libro Oficial Cobreloa Un Impacto en el Desierto (2007), Carlos Gómez/Cedep, Chile
- Historia del Deporte Chileno: Entre la pasión y la ilusión [Chilean Sport History: Between the pasion and the ilusion] (PDF) (in Spanish). Chile: Comisión Bicentenario Presidencia de la República. June 2007. ISBN 978-9-56-780865-6.
- Gatica Wiermann, Héctor (May 2019). Almanaque del Fútbol Chileno. Clubes [Almanac of Chilean Football. Clubs] (in Spanish). Chile: Hueders. ISBN 978-956-365-170-6.
- Beraud Zurita, Jorge (2006). Cobreloa Equipo de hombres [Cobreloa, a men's team] (in Spanish). Chile. ISBN 956-8142-45-2.
- Flores Reyes, Paulo (2018). Datos Naranjas Historias y Anécdotas de Cobreloa [The Oranges data Histories and Anecdotes of Cobreloa] (in Spanish). Chile. ISBN 978-956-9496-22-6.

=== Magazines ===
- Avila, Homero (1962). "Con todos los honores" [With all honors]. Revista Estadio (in Spanish). Chile: Editorial Zig-Zag.
- Martinez, Julio (1977). "A propósito del Ascenso" [Regarding the promotion]. Revista Estadio N° 1,745 (in Spanish). Chile: Editorial Zig-Zag.
- Salviat, Julio (1977). "Cobreloa: Sueños de Benjamín" [Cobreloa: Dreams of 'benjamin']. Revista Estadio N° 1,767 (in Spanish). Chile: Editorial Zig-Zag.
- "Diganos" [Cobreloa: Say to us]. Revista Estadio N° 1,782 (in Spanish). Chile: Editorial Zig-Zag. 1977.
- Escarate, Orlando (1977). "Chile, o la ilusión de los jóvenes" [Chile, or the illusion of youth football players]. Revista Estadio N° 1,757 (in Spanish). Chile: Editorial Zig-Zag. p. 28.
- Flores, Alfonso (1990). "COBRELOA 90". Special Edition (in Spanish). Chile: Editorial Antartida S.A.
- Barra Veira, Pablo; Maturana Miranda, Francisco (6 October 2015). "ANÁLISIS DEL PROCESO DE DIFUSIÓN ESPACIAL DEL FÚTBOL PROFESIONAL EN CHILE" [ANALYSIS OF THE SPATIAL DIFFUSION PROCESS OF PROFESSIONAL FOOTBALL IN CHILE]. Papeles de Geografía (in Spanish). No. 61. Spain: Universidad de Murcia. p. 97. doi:10.6018/geografia/2015/224081.
- "CASI TODO LÓGICO" [ALMOST ALL LOGICAL]. Revista Estadio (Number 862) (in Spanish). Chile: Editorial Zig-Zag. 3 December 1959.
- "Caritas: El gran negocio de la miseria" [Caritas: The big business of misery] (PDF). Punto Final (in Spanish). Chile: Editorial Prensa Latinoamericana. 15 October 1966.

=== Newspapers ===
- "Mineros del Cobre y Salitre como "Tabla" con el club El Loa" [Copper and Saltpeter Miners as "Tabla" with the El Loa Club]. La Nación (in Spanish). Chile. 3 March 1971. p. 12.
- Rojas, Patricio; Muñoz, Alejandro (11 January 1972). "Todos los equipos son una incognita" [All teams are a riddle]. La Nación (in Spanish). Chile. p. 10.
- "EL DOMINGO COMIENZA EL III NACIONAL JUVENIL DE FÚTBOL" [THE 3RD NATIONAL YOUTH SOCCER CHAMPIONSHIP BEGINS ON SUNDAY.]. La Nación (in Spanish). Chile. 25 July 1957. p. 11.
- "SANTIAGO ACTUARÁ FRENTE A ÑUÑOA" [SANTIAGO WILL PERFORM IN FRONT OF ÑUÑOA]. La Nación (in Spanish). Chile. 25 August 1949. p. 17.
- "CALAMA, CAMPEÓN NACIONAL DE FÚTBOL AMATEUR" [CALAMA, NATIONAL AMATEUR FOOTBALL CHAMPION]. La Nación (in Spanish). Chile. 10 November 1959.
- "ELIMINADOS" [ELIMATED]. La Nación (in Spanish). Chile. 30 November 1959. p. 18.
- "DIEZ PLAZAS PIDIO EL FÚTBOL AMATEUR" [TEN PLACES ASKED FOR AMATEUR FOOTBALL]. La Nación (in Spanish). Chile. 14 November 1959.
- "SORTEO DE LA COPA CHILE" [CHILE CUP DRAW]. La Nación (in Spanish). Chile. 15 November 1959.
- "CHUQUICAMATA, CAMPEÓN INVICTO" [CHUQUICAMATA, UNDEFEATED CHAMPION]. La Nación (in Spanish). Chile. 18 December 1961. p. 20.
- "CALAMA QUIERE LLEVARSE AL NORTE A SANTIAGO MORNING" [CALAMA WANTS TO TAKE SANTIAGO MORNING TO THE NORTH]. La Nación (in Spanish). Chile. 25 August 1967. p. 18.
- "TRONADOR Y COQUIMBO SON LOS PUNTEROS" [TRONADOR AND COQUIMBO ARE THE LEADERS]. La Nación (in Spanish). Chile. 18 August 1960. p. 20.
- "FUMARONE INTERESA AL AUDAX Y VASQUEZ A LA "U"" [TAUDAX IS INTERESTED IN FUMARONE AND VASQUEZ IN "U".]. La Nación (in Spanish). Chile. 21 March 1964. p. 12.
- "EL ASCENSO NO ACEPTA PARA 1966 EL INGRESO DE NUEVOS CLUBES" [THE PROMOTION DOES NOT ACCEPT NEW CLUBS FOR 1966.]. La Nación (in Spanish). Chile. 7 December 1965.
- "MUNICIPAL DE LIMA GOLEÓ A CHUQUICAMATA 5-1" [MUNICIPAL DE LIMA DEFEATED CHUQUICAMATA 5-1]. La Nación (in Spanish). Chile. 30 March 1964. p. 2.
- "EL PUEBLO ESTUVO DE FIESTA" [THE PEOPLE WERE ON PARTY]. La Nación (in Spanish). Chile. 12 July 1972. p. 2.

=== Documents ===
- "Carta N° 104" [Letter N° 104] (Document). Calama, Chile: Ilustre Municipalidad de Calama. 4 November 2019. p. 1.

=== Websites ===
- Nuñez, Felipe; Saavedra, Bryan (24 November 2024). "El zorro, la sirena y el campeón de los 80" [The fox, the siren and the champion of the 80s]. Bush in action (in Spanish). Chile.
