= Carlos Rojas =

Carlos Rojas may refer to:

- Carlos Rojas (footballer, born 1928) (1928–1963), Chilean football midfielder
- Carlos Rojas (footballer, born 1956) (born 1956), Chilean football defender
- Carlos Rojas García (born 1970), Spanish politician, mayor of Motril
- Carlos Rojas Gutiérrez (1954–2024), Mexican politician, secretary of social development (1993–1998)
- Carlos Rojas Pavez (1906–1994), Chilean politician, mayor of the commune of Pichilemu
- Carlos Rojas (sinologist) (born 1970), American sinologist and translator
- Carlos Rojas Vila (1928–2020), Spanish author, academic, and artist
- Carlos "Cuco" Rojas (1954–2020), Colombian harpist

== See also ==
- Juan Carlos Rojas (disambiguation)
