= Héctor Puebla =

Chilean footballer (born 1955)

Hector Puebla
Personal information
- Full name: Héctor Puebla Saavedra
- Date of birth: 10 July 1955 (age 71)
- Place of birth: La Ligua, Chile
- Position: Midfielder

Senior career*
| Years | Team | Apps | (Gls) |
| 1977–1979 | Lota Schwager | 60 | (2) |
| 1980–1996 | Cobreloa | 448 | (27) |
| Total | | 508 | (29) |

International career
| 1984–1990 | Chile | 34 | (1) |
- * Club domestic league appearances and goals

Héctor Puebla Saavedra (born 10 July 1955) is a Chilean former footballer commonly known for playing in Cobreloa during sixteen years.

== Career ==
Nicknamed "El Ligua" after his hometown, La Ligua. Puebla came to Cobreloa in 1980 from southern Chilean soccer team Lota Schwager, where he played as a striker, and slowly became a central defender he was while playing for Cobreloa.

Puebla played many games for the national squad. In a game against Argentina in the 1989 Copa América, he annulled the world's top Diego Maradona. They exchanged their jerseys and Puebla sold it to be exhibit in any Mexican museum. He played 34 matches for Chile, scoring 1 goal between 1984 and 1990, making his debut on 1984-06-17 in a game against England.

== Personal life ==
In addition to Ligua, Puebla was nicknamed El Siete Pulmones (The Seven Lungs) due to his aerobic ability.

== Honours ==
Cobreloa

- Primera División de Chile (1): 1980, 1982, 1985, 1988, 1992
- Copa Libertadores Runner-up (2): 1981, 1982
