= Mario Soto (footballer, born 1950) =

Chilean footballer

Personal information
- Full name: Mario del Tránsito Soto Benavides
- Date of birth: July 10, 1950 (age 76)
- Place of birth: Santiago, Chile
- Height: 1.77 m (5 ft 9 1/2 in)
- Position: Centre back

Youth career
- Magallanes

Senior career*
Years	Team	Apps	(Gls)
1969–1973	Magallanes	?	(?)
1974–1976	Union Española	59	(1)
1977	Palmeiras	3	(0)
1978–1985	Cobreloa	190	(11)
1986	Deportes Concepción	?	(?)
1986	Audax Italiano	?	(?)
1987–1989	Lozapenco	?	(?)

International career
1975–1985	Chile	48	(1)

Managerial career
- 2004: Unión San Felipe
- 2005–2006: Santiago Wanderers
- 2010: Cobreloa
- * Club domestic league appearances and goals

Mario del Tránsito Soto Benavides (born July 10, 1950) is a Chilean former football defender who played as a centre back.

== Career ==
Soto played for his native country in the 1982 FIFA World Cup. In total for his country he played 48 matches scoring 1 goal between 1975 and 1985.

Soto is one of the biggest idols of Chilean club Cobreloa.

He also played for club football for Chileans CD Magallanes and Unión Española, and Brazilian side Palmeiras.

== Honours ==
Unión Española

- Chilean Primera División: 1975

Cobreloa

- Chilean Primera División: 1980, 1982, 1985

Lozapenco

- Chilean Tercera División: 1989
