= Luis García (footballer, born 1996) =

Chilean footballer

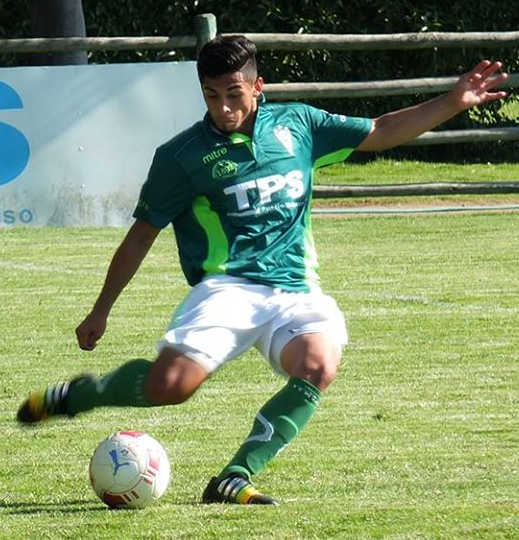

Personal information
- Full name: Luis Francisco García Varas
- Date of birth: 9 February 1996 (age 30)
- Place of birth: Cabildo, Chile
- Height: 1.75 m (5 ft 9 in)
- Positions: Midfielder; right-back

Team information
- Current team: Unión San Felipe

Youth career
- 2009–2015: Santiago Wanderers

Senior career*
Years	Team	Apps	(Gls)
2015–2022	Santiago Wanderers	187	(7)
2023–2025	Cobreloa	76	(2)
2026–	Unión San Felipe	0	(0)

International career
2017	Chile U21	1	(0)
- * Club domestic league appearances and goals as of 9 February 2026

Luis Francisco García Varas (born 9 February 1996) is a Chilean footballer who plays as a midfielder. He can operate as a defensive midfielder or a right-back for Unión San Felipe.

== Club career ==
Born in Cabildo, Chile, García joined the Santiago Wanderers youth ranks at the age of 13 and made his senior debut in the 2–2 away draw against Unión La Calera on 15 July 2015 for the Copa Chile. He was the team captain since 2021 and won both the 2017 Copa Chile and the 2019 Primera B de Chile. He left them in December 2022 after spending eight seasons with them at professional level.

In 2023, García switched to Cobreloa and won the league title of the Primera B. He continued with them in the 2024 Chilean Primera División and left them at the end of 2025.

In February 2026, García signed with Unión San Felipe.

== International career ==
García made an appearance for Chile at under-21 level in the 1–1 away draw against France on 1 Septiembre 2017.

== Personal life ==
Born in Cabildo, Chile, García was honored by the Municipality of the city on 29 December 2021.
