= Cristian Muga =

Uruguayan footballer

Personal information
- Full name: Cristian Daniel Muga Machado
- Date of birth: 2 January 1996 (age 30)
- Place of birth: Montevideo, Uruguay
- Height: 1.79 m (5 ft 10 in)
- Position: Midfielder

Team information
- Current team: Cobreloa

Youth career
- River Plate Montevideo
- 2016–2017: Liverpool Montevideo

Senior career*
| Years | Team | Apps | (Gls) |
| 2017 | Liverpool Montevideo | 9 | (0) |
| 2018 | Uruguay Montevideo | 4 | (0) |
| 2018 | C.A.I. | – | (–) |
| 2018–2019 | Guillermo Brown | 0 | (0) |
| 2020–2021 | Uruguay Montevideo | 34 | (0) |
| 2022 | Rampla Juniors | 24 | (1) |
| 2023–2024 | Santiago Morning | 56 | (6) |
| 2025– | Cobreloa | 0 | (0) |
- * Club domestic league appearances and goals as of 18 December 2024

Cristian Daniel Muga Machado (born 2 January 1996) is a Uruguayan footballer who plays as a midfielder for Chilean club Cobreloa.

== Club career ==
Muga was with River Plate from Montevideo before joining Liverpool, with whom he made his professional debut in June 2017.

In 2018, he switched to Uruguay Montevideo. In the same year, he moved to Argentina and had a brief stint with Comisión de Actividades Infantiles (C.A.I.) before joining Guillermo Brown. He made four appearances for Guillermo Brown in the 2019–20 Primera Nacional.

Back to Uruguay, he rejoined Uruguay Montevideo, with whom he won the 2020 Primera División Amateur and the promotion to the Segunda División.

In 2022, Muga played for Rampla Juniors.

In 2023, he moved abroad again and signed with Chilean club Santiago Morning. He renewed with them for the 2024 season. He moved to Cobreloa for the 2025 season.

== Honours ==
Uruguay Montevideo

- Primera División Amateur: 2020

Cobreloa

- Primera B de Chile: 2026
