= Diego Tapia =

Chilean footballer

Personal information
- Full name: Diego Andrés Tapia Rojas
- Date of birth: 7 May 1995 (age 31)
- Place of birth: Arica, Chile
- Height: 1.86 m (6 ft 1 in)
- Position: Goalkeeper

Team information
- Current team: Cobreloa

Youth career
- San Marcos

Senior career*
Years	Team	Apps	(Gls)
2016–2018	San Marcos	3	(0)
2017	→ Sport Victoria (loan)		
2019	Curicó Unido	0	(0)
2019	Barnechea	0	(0)
2020–2023	Magallanes	12	(0)
2021	→ Colchagua	2	(0)
2024–2025	Ñublense	4	(0)
2026–	Cobreloa	0	(0)
- * Club domestic league appearances and goals as of 18 December 2025

Diego Andrés Tapia Rojas (7 May 1995) is a Chilean footballer who plays as a goalkeeper for Cobreloa.

== Club career ==
Born in Arica, Chile, Tapia is a product of the local team, San Marcos de Arica. In 2017, he was loaned out to Peruvian club Sport Victoria. Back to San Marcos in 2018, he made his debut with them.

After being a member of Curicó Unido and Barnechea during 2019, Tapia joined Magallanes in January 2020. A player during a successful stint of the club, he won the 2022 Primera B, the 2022 Copa Chile and the 2023 Supercopa de Chile. He continued with them for the 2023 Primera División and took part in both the 2023 Copa Libertadores and 2023 Copa Sudamericana. As a player of Magallanes, he also had a stint on loan with Colchagua in the 2021 Segunda División Profesional.

In January 2024, Tapia signed with Ñublense in the Chilean Primera División.

In December 2025, Tapia joined Cobreloa for the 2026 season.

== Personal life ==
Diego is the older brother of the also goalkeeper, Benjamín Tapia.

Tapia has publicly declared himself a supporter of Cobreloa.

== Honours ==
Magallanes

- Primera B de Chile: 2022
- Copa Chile: 2022
- Supercopa de Chile: 2023

Cobreloa

- Primera B de Chile: 2026
