= Rubén Vallejos =

Chilean footballer and manager (born 1967)

Personal information
- Full name: Rubén Orlando Vallejos Gajardo
- Date of birth: 20 May 1967 (age 59)
- Place of birth: Parral, Chile
- Height: 1.78 m (5 ft 10 in)
- Position: Forward

Senior career*
Years	Team	Apps	(Gls)
1987–1989	Colchagua	63	(20)
1990	General Velásquez	34	(15)
1991–1992	Magallanes	40	(16)
1993	Deportes Antofagasta	21	(8)
1994	Colo-Colo	24	(9)
1995	Palestino	25	(11)
1996	Unión Española	26	(12)
1997	Correcaminos UAT	15	(8)
1997	Deportes Puerto Montt	16	(10)
1998–2000	Cobreloa	98	(56)
2001–2002	Rangers	18	(5)
2003	Magallanes	8	(0)
Total		388	(170)

Managerial career
- 2008: Cobreloa
- 2009: Cobreloa
- 2010: Rangers
- 2012: Colchagua
- 2014: Cobresal (caretaker)
- 2015: Cobresal (caretaker)
- 2015: Cobresal
- 2017: Cobresal
- * Club domestic league appearances and goals

Rubén Orlando Vallejos Gajardo (born 20 May 1967) is a Chilean former footballer and manager. He was most recently the head coach of Cobresal.

He is a highlighted goalscorer of the Chilean football in 1990s.

== Personal life ==
As a football player, he was nicknamed Camión (Truck) due to his physical power.

== Honours ==
Individual

- Campeonato Nacional (Chile) Top-Scorer: 1997–C 1

(1): "A" and "C" refer the Apertura and Clausura tournaments that divide the Chilean football champions.
