= Juan Covarrubias =

Chilean footballer (born 1961)

Personal information
- Full name: Juan Carlos Covarrubias Muñoz
- Date of birth: 1961 (age 64–65)
- Place of birth: Temuco, Chile
- Positions: Left midfielder; left wing

Senior career*
Years	Team	Apps	(Gls)
1976–1979	Rangers		
1980–1982	Green Cross T.		
1983–1994	Cobreloa		
1995	Everton		
1996	Ñublense		

International career^{‡}
1984–?	Chile	16	(2)
- * Club domestic league appearances and goals as of 15 November 2008 ‡ National team caps and goals as of 15

Juan Carlos Covarrubias Muñoz (born 1961), commonly known as Juan Covarrubias, is a Chilean footballer who played as a left midfielder in the Chilean Primera División.

== Career ==
He made his debut in 1976 in Talca Rangers, later defended the colors of his hometown of Green Cross Temuco in 1980. Then in 1983 he was part of the cast of Cobreloa and vie for the Copa Libertadores.

In 1995, he arrived at Everton and while his contract was for two years chose to leave because of problems in the team. Before ending his career, he joined the staff of Ñublense. After finishing his career as a footballer, he devoted himself entirely to his business of moving personnel and cargo transport. He currently serves as the technical manager of football young Ñublense.

Striker Marcelo Salas, also born in Temuco, has mentioned Juan Covarrubias as a childhood idol.
