= Carlos Rojas (footballer, born 1956) =

Chilean football manager and player

Personal information
- Full name: Carlos Enrique Rojas Muñoz
- Date of birth: 18 January 1956 (age 70)
- Place of birth: Ollagüe, Chile
- Position: Centre-back

Team information
- Current team: Municipal Mejillones (manager)

Youth career
- Cobreloa

Senior career*
Years	Team	Apps	(Gls)
1977–1990	Cobreloa	164	(14)
1988	→ Unión Española (loan)	24	(0)
1991	Deportes Arica		

Managerial career
- Cobreloa (youth)
- 1997–1998: Cobreloa
- 2000: Cobreloa
- 2004: Deportes Antofagasta
- 2006: O'Higgins (assistant)
- 2006: Cooferro
- 2010: Cobreloa (assistant)
- 2010–2011: Santiago Wanderers (assistant)
- 2011: Provincial Osorno
- 2011: Ñublense (assistant)
- 2011–2013: Ñublense
- 2013–2014: Coquimbo Unido
- 2014–2015: Rangers
- 2016: Cobreloa
- 2017–: Municipal Mejillones
- * Club domestic league appearances and goals

Carlos Enrique Rojas Muñoz (born 18 January 1956) is a Chilean football manager and former player who played as a centre-back.

== Playing career ==
Born in Ollagüe, Chile, Rojas was trained and spent almost all his professional career with Cobreloa from 1977 to 1990, winning the Chilean Primera División three times in 1980, 1982 and 1985 and the 1986 Copa Polla Lan Chile. He also was a member of the squads that became the runners-up at the Copa Libertadores in 1981 and 1982.

In addition to Cobreloa, Rojas played for Unión Española in 1988 and Deportes Arica in 1991.

== Managerial career ==
Rojas started coaching the Cobreloa youth ranks before being appointed as the first team manager in 1997. He returned to them in 2004, 2010 as assistant, and 2016.

Rojas has also led Deportes Antofagasta, Cooferro, Provincial Osorno, Ñublense, Coquimbo Unido and Rangers.

In 2017, Rojas assumed as manager of Municipal Mejillones.
