= Facundo Velazco =

Argentine footballer

Personal information
- Full name: Facundo Ezequiel Velazco Flores
- Date of birth: 19 March 1999 (age 27)
- Place of birth: Salta, Argentina
- Height: 1.70 m (5 ft 7 in)
- Position: Left midfielder

Team information
- Current team: Cobreloa
- Number: 32

Youth career
- Independiente

Senior career*
Years	Team	Apps	(Gls)
2020	Independiente	0	(0)
2021–2023	Juventud Antoniana	57	(2)
2023–2024	Nacional Asunción	31	(4)
2025	San Marcos	31	(1)
2026–	Cobreloa	0	(0)
- * Club domestic league appearances and goals as of 1 March 2026

Facundo Ezequiel Velazco Flores (born 19 March 1999) is an Argentine footballer who plays as a left midfielder for Chilean club Cobreloa.

== Club career ==
Born in Salta, Argentina, Velazco started his career with Independiente. In January 2021, he signed with Juventud Antoniana in the Torneo Federal B and got the promotion to the Torneo Federal A a year later.

In the second half of 2023, Velazco moved abroad and signed with Paraguayan club Nacional.

In January 2025, Velazco moved to Chile and signed with San Marcos de Arica. He scored a goal in his debut with them in the 2–2 draw against Coquimbo Unido for the Copa Chile on 28 January 2025. The next year, he switched to Cobreloa.

== Honours ==
Cobreloa

- Primera B de Chile: 2026
