= Matías Sandoval =

Argentine professional footballer

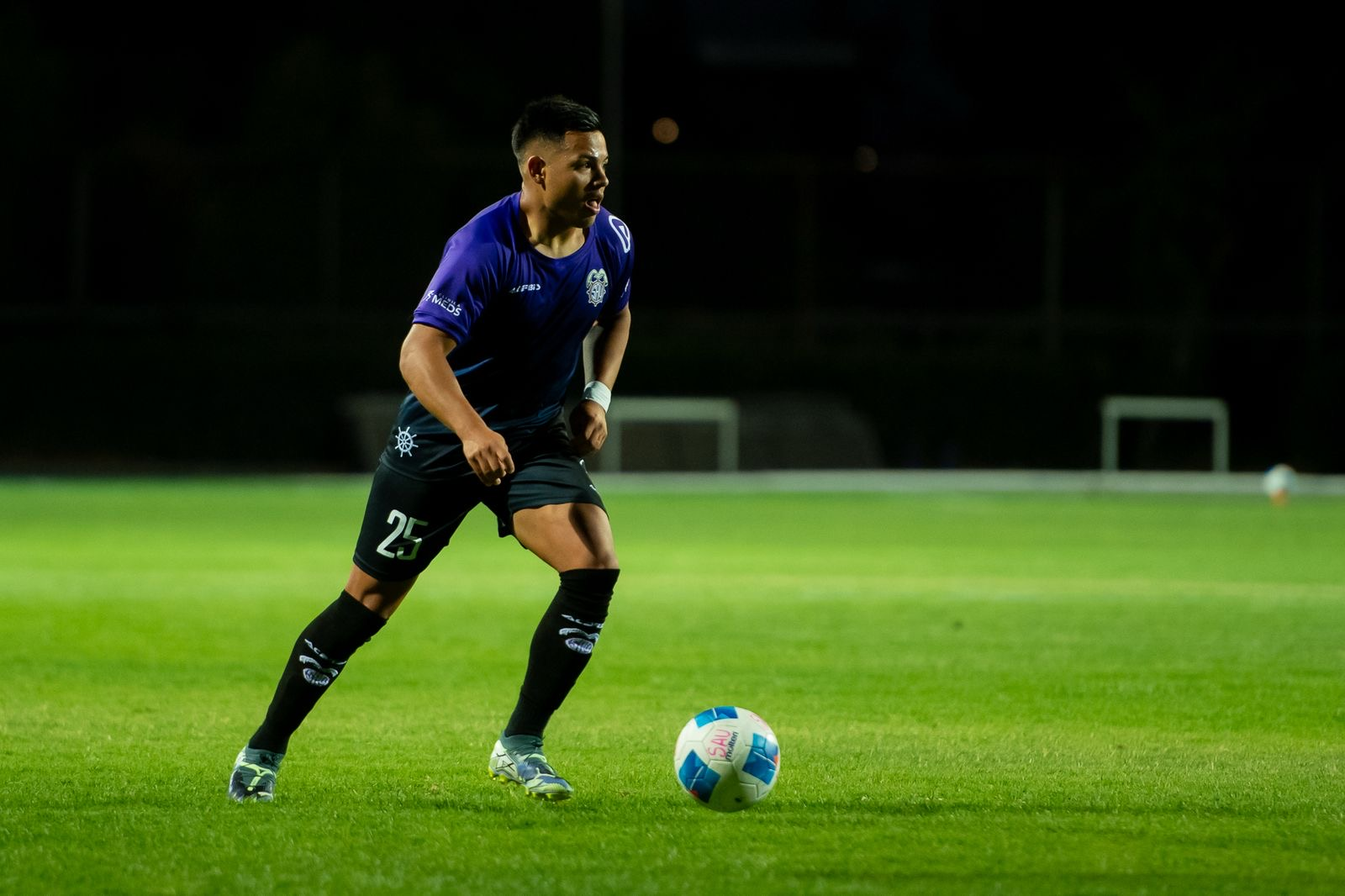
- Sandoval with San Antonio Unido in 2025

Personal information
- Date of birth: 9 April 1997 (age 29)
- Place of birth: Ciudad Evita, Argentina
- Height: 1.70 m (5 ft 7 in)
- Position: Forward

Team information
- Current team: Cobreloa

Youth career
- All Boys

Senior career*
Years	Team	Apps	(Gls)
2015–2020	All Boys	32	(1)
2020–2021	Sportivo Italiano	38	(8)
2022	Ituzaingó	31	(5)
2023–2024	Unión San Felipe	52	(4)
2025	San Antonio Unido	11	(4)
2025	Rangers	11	(2)
2026–	Cobreloa	0	(0)
- * Club domestic league appearances and goals as of 18 December 2025

Matías David Sandoval (born 9 April 1997) is an Argentine professional footballer who plays as a forward for Chilean club Cobreloa.

== Career ==
Sandoval's career began with All Boys. He made a total of nineteen appearances across four seasons from the 2015 Primera B Nacional, including for his senior bow on 6 May 2015 in a goalless draw versus Atlético Tucumán. Sandoval scored for the first time during his twentieth match for the club, netting in a 4–0 victory over Agropecuario on 12 November 2017. He left the club in June 2020 after thirty-three appearances. A move to Sportivo Italiano soon followed.

In 2023, Sandoval moved to Chile and joined Unión San Felipe.

After playing for San Antonio Unido and Rangers de Talca during 2025, Sandoval joined Cobreloa for the 2026 season.

== Career statistics ==
As of 23 October 2020.

Appearances and goals by club, season and competition
Club	Season	League			Cup		League Cup		Continental		Other		Total	
Club	Season	Division	Apps	Goals	Apps	Goals	Apps	Goals	Apps	Goals	Apps	Goals	Apps	Goals
All Boys	2015	Primera B Nacional	3	0	0	0	—		—		0	0	3	0
All Boys	2016	Primera B Nacional	0	0	0	0	—		—		0	0	0	0
All Boys	2016–17	Primera B Nacional	9	0	1	0	—		—		0	0	10	0
All Boys	2017–18	Primera B Nacional	14	1	0	0	—		—		0	0	14	1
All Boys	2018–19	Primera B Metropolitana	6	0	0	0	—		—		0	0	6	0
All Boys	2019–20	Primera B Nacional	0	0	0	0	—		—		0	0	0	0
All Boys	Total		32	1	1	0	—		—		0	0	33	1
Sportivo Italiano	2020–21	Primera C Metropolitana	0	0	0	0	—		—		0	0	0	0
Career total			32	1	1	0	—		—		0	0	33	1

== Honours ==
Cobreloa

- Primera B de Chile: 2026
