= Luis Ahumada =

Mexican footballer (born 1992)

Personal information
- Full name: Luis Eduardo Ahumada García
- Date of birth: 14 October 1992 (age 34)
- Place of birth: Ciudad Victoria, Tamaulipas
- Position: Defender

Youth career
- Correcaminos UAT

Senior career*
Years	Team	Apps	(Gls)
2010–2012	Correcaminos UAT III	37	(9)
2010–2014	Correcaminos UAT Premier	63	(7)
2013–2016	Correcaminos UAT	6	(0)
2014–2015	→ Real Cuautitlán (loan)	21	(1)
2016–2017	Real Cuautitlán	26	(6)
2017–2018	Atlético Reynosa	21	(1)
2018–2019	Correcaminos UAT	0	(0)
2018–2019	→ Correcaminos UAT Premier (loan)	28	(0)
- * Club domestic league appearances and goals

Luis Eduardo Ahumada García (born 14 October 1992) is a Mexican former professional footballer who played as a defender, most notably for Correcaminos UAT.

== Career ==
Nicknamed "Tano", Ahumada is a youth exponent from the Correcaminos UAT academy. He made his first-team debut on 5 March 2013 during a Copa MX match against Dorados de Sinaloa. Ahumada scored his first professional goal against Club Puebla, also during a Copa MX match.

Ahumada was sent on loan to Real Cuautitlán in 2014. He was a key member of the squad, serving as team captain. Ahumada re-joined the Correcaminos UAT and played in a few Copa MX matches before he suffered a knee injury during training in August 2015. As a result, he was sidelined for several months. After considering an early retirement, Ahumada returned to Real Cuautitlán on a permanent deal in 2016. He played 26 matches for the club, scoring three goals. Ahumada subsequently joined Atlético Reynosa, where he served as the team captain.

In 2018, Ahumada returned to his boyhood club, Correcaminos UAT. He served as captain of their reserve team, Correcaminos UAT Premier, in addition to training with the first team. Ahumada continued his playing career in the amateur Liga Santander Premier, winning the 2020–21 league title with Las Palmas FC.

In June 2019, Ahumada was hired as the director of the Correcaminos UAT "Embajadores de Paz" youth academy. He was announced as the equipment manager for their first team in March 2021, but left the role after only two games after allegedly functioning as an assistant coach for the club, which went against league rules as he did not have proper documentation. Ahumada returned to Correcaminos UAT in November 2022 as the club's technical secretary.

== Personal life ==
Ahumada was born to Carlos Ahumada and Lupita García and hails from the Lázaro Cárdenas neighborhood of Ciudad Victoria, Tamaulipas. He earned a Licentiate degree from the Autonomous University of Tamaulipas Faculty of Educational Sciences and Humanities.
