= Juan Pablo Toro =

Chilean footballer (born 1976)

Personal information
- Full name: Juan Pablo Toro Jara
- Date of birth: 19 October 1976 (age 50)
- Place of birth: San Vicente de Tagua Tagua, Chile
- Height: 1.85 m (6 ft 1 in)
- Position: Centre-back

Youth career
- Colo-Colo

Senior career*
Years	Team	Apps	(Gls)
1995	Colo-Colo	1	(0)
1997–1999	Universidad de Concepción		
2000–2001	Deportes Temuco		
2002–2006	Unión Española		
2007	Universidad de Concepción		
2008–2010	Ñublense		
2010–2011	Unión Temuco		
2012	Colchagua		

Managerial career
- 2023: Malleco Unido
- 2024: Imperial Unido
- * Club domestic league appearances and goals

Juan Pablo Toro Jara (born 19 October 1976), known as Juan Pablo Toro, is a Chilean former footballer who played as centre-back.

== Club career ==
Toro made his debut with Colo-Colo in 1995.

He played for clubs like Universidad de Concepción and Unión Española.

== Coaching career ==
Toro led Malleco Unido in 2023. The next year, he led Imperial Unido for about four months in the Chilean Tercera A.

== Honours ==
=== Player ===
Universidad de Concepción

- Tercera División de Chile (1): 1997

Deportes Temuco

- Primera B (1): 2001

Unión Española

- Primera División de Chile (1): 2005 Apertura
