= Juan Carlos Rojas =

Juan Carlos Rojas may refer to:

- Juan Carlos Rojas (footballer), a professional footballer
- Juan Carlos Rojas Villegas, a professional cyclist
