= 1986 Copa Polla Lan Chile =

Tournament details
- Country: Chile

The 1986 Copa Polla Lan Chile was the 16th edition of the Chilean Cup tournament. The competition started on February 22, 1986, and concluded on June 14, 1986. Only first level teams took part in the tournament. Cobreloa won the competition for their first time, beating Fernández Vial in the finals.

== Calendar ==
Round	Date
Group Round	22 February 1986; 1 June 1986
Finals	8–14 June 1986

== Group Round ==
Key to colours in group tables
Teams that progressed to the Final

=== Group North ===
	DIQ	CLO	CSA	SLU	ULC	UCA	UCH	AUD	MAG	RAN
D. Iquique		1–0	3–1	2–2	1–1	1–0	2–3	3–1	3–2	0–4
Cobreloa	3–1		3–0	1–0	2–0	3–1	1–1	3–1	3–1	3–1
Cobresal	2–4	0–1		2–0	5–1	2–1	2–1	1–1	2–1	0–1
San Luis	3–2	0–3	1–1		1–1	1–1	1–2	2–1	3–2	0–0
U. La Calera	2–0	1–1	0–4	1–2		0–1	1–2	2–2	0–1	3–1
U. Católica	2–1	4–1	2–2	2–0	3–4		0–1	4–1	0–0	1–1
U. de Chile	1–2	0–5	1–1	2–0	3–1	3–0		2–0	2–0	4–1
Audax I.	2–6	3–1	2–0	1–1	3–1	3–1	1–2		0–1	0–0
Magallanes	1–1	0–0	1–3	2–0	3–1	2–1	1–2	1–2		1–1
Rangers	1–1	2–3	1–2	5–1	4–2	1–0	1–0	1–1	1–0	

Rank	Team	Points
1	Cobreloa	27
2	Universidad de Chile	26
3	Cobresal	20 (+5 GF:30)
4	Rangers	20 (+5 GF:27)
5	Deportes Iquique	20 (+3)
6	Audax Italiano	15
7	Universidad Católica	14 (-3)
8	Magallanes	14 (-5)
9	San Luis	14 (-13)
10	Unión La Calera	10

=== Group South ===
	USF	CAN	EVE	UES	COL	PAL	NAV	HUA	DCO	FVI
U. San Felipe		5–1	3–2	1–1	0–3	2–2	2–0	0–0	1–1	1–0
Cobreandino	1–1		0–0	2–1	2–3	3–1	1–0	1–0	1–0	0–0
Everton	1–1	1–0		0–0	1–3	2–0	3–0	1–3	3–1	1–0
U. Española	4–0	0–0	2–0		2–2	3–3	3–2	1–4	3–2	0–0
Colo-Colo	6–1	0–0	1–0	1–1		3–3	2–2	2–4	0–0	1–1
Palestino	1–1	1–0	1–2	3–2	1–0		1–1	2–0	1–1	3–4
Naval	0–1	0–0	3–1	3–1	0–0	2–1		2–1	1–0	1–0
Huachipato	1–2	5–0	1–2	0–0	1–0	2–2	2–1		1–0	0–3
D. Concepción	1–0	2–0	1–0	1–1	0–0	2–2	4–1	1–1		0–0
F. Vial	2–0	1–0	1–0	2–0	0–0	1–1	1–1	0–0	2–0	

Rank	Team	Points
1	Fernández Vial	22
2	Colo-Colo	20
3	Huachipato	19 (+6)
4	Unión San Felipe	19 (-5)
5	Unión Española	17 (-1 GF:25)
6	Everton	17 (-1 GF:20)
7	Palestino	19 (-2)
8	Naval	17 (-4)
9	Deportes Concepción	16 (-1)
10	Cobreandino	16 (-9)

== Finals ==
June 8, 1986

Fernández Vial	0 – 1	Cobreloa
		48' Arriaza

Estadio Municipal, Concepción
Attendance: 13,225
Referee: G. Castro
June 11, 1986

Cobreloa	0 – 2	Fernández Vial
		15' Zambrano; 23' J. Sáez

Estadio Municipal, Calama
Attendance: 4,669
Referee: E. Marín
June 14, 1986

Cobreloa	3 – 0 (a.e.t.)	Fernández Vial
J. García 99'; L. González 113', 117'

Estadio Regional, Antofagasta
Attendance: 10,851
Referee: V. Ojeda

== Top goalscorer ==
- Juan Carlos Letelier (Cobreloa) 11 goals

== See also ==
- 1986 Campeonato Nacional

== Sources ==
- Revista Deporte Total, (Santiago, Chile) February–June 1986 (scores & information)
- Diario La Tercera, (Santiago, Chile) February–June 1986 (some scores & information)
