= 1982 Campeonato Nacional Primera División =

Campeonato Nacional 1982
- Dates: 17 July 1982 – 30 January 1983
- Champions: Cobreloa (2nd title)
- Relegated: Deportes La Serena; Santiago Morning
- 1983 Copa Libertadores: Cobreloa; Colo-Colo (Liguilla winners)
- Matches: 240
- Goals: 688 (2.87 per match)
- Top goalscorer: Jorge Luis Siviero (18 goals)
- Biggest home win: Santiago Morning 9–1 Rangers (18 September)
- Highest attendance: 72,717 Universidad de Chile 0–1 Colo-Colo (26 September)
- Total attendance: 1,207,593
- Average attendance: 5,117

The 1982 Campeonato Nacional was Chilean football league top tier’s 50th season. Cobreloa was the tournament’s champion, winning its second title.

== League table ==
Pos	Team	Pld	W	D	L	GF	GA	GD	Pts	Qualification or relegation
1	Cobreloa	30	19	6	5	69	23	+46	45 (Note: 1 bonus point awarded.)	Champions; Qualified to 1983 Copa Libertadores
2	Colo-Colo	30	14	11	5	41	21	+20	41 (Note: 2 bonus points awarded.)	Qualified to Liguilla Pre-Copa Libertadores
3	Universidad de Chile	30	14	10	6	58	38	+20	39	Qualified to Liguilla Pre-Copa Libertadores
4	Magallanes	30	15	9	6	63	38	+25	39	Qualified to Liguilla Pre-Copa Libertadores
5	Naval	30	14	10	6	52	33	+19	38	Qualified to Liguilla Pre-Copa Libertadores
6	Universidad Católica	30	13	11	6	50	33	+17	38	
7	O'Higgins	30	12	10	8	48	39	+9	34	
8	Deportes Iquique	30	12	6	12	39	44	−5	30	
9	Regional Atacama	30	10	8	12	36	43	−7	28	
10	Deportes Arica	30	11	6	13	37	47	−10	28	
11	Audax Italiano	30	10	7	13	41	44	−3	27	
12	Unión Española	30	10	5	15	39	56	−17	25	To Promotion/relegation Liguilla
13	Palestino	30	6	12	12	30	44	−14	24	To Promotion/relegation Liguilla
14	Deportes La Serena	30	5	9	16	26	53	−27	19	Relegated to Segunda División
15	Santiago Morning	30	4	7	19	34	58	−24	15	Relegated to Segunda División
16	Rangers	30	5	5	20	25	74	−49	15	

Notes:

Campeonato Nacional
1982 champions
Cobreloa
2nd title

== Results ==
Home \ Away	AUD	DAR	RAT	CLO	COL	DIQ	DLS	MAG	NAV	OHI	PAL	RAN	SMO	UCA	UCH	UES
Audax		2–0	2–3	4–3	0–0	2–4	4–1	1–1	4–1	1–0	1–1	3–2	1–0	0–2	2–1	0–2
Arica	4–3		1–1	1–3	2–3	2–1	2–1	4–2	1–1	1–3	2–3	2–0	0–0	1–1	2–1	3–1
Atacama	0–0	2–1		1–3	1–0	2–0	0–0	1–3	1–1	0–1	2–2	2–0	2–0	0–0	2–2	2–1
Cobreloa	2–0	3–0	3–0		0–0	7–0	5–0	5–1	1–0	3–1	3–0	6–1	3–1	2–0	1–0	1–0
Colo-Colo	2–0	0–0	2–1	1–0		3–1	1–1	1–0	0–0	3–4	2–3	0–0	4–1	0–1	2–2	3–0
Iquique	0–0	2–0	2–0	2–2	1–2		3–1	1–2	2–0	0–1	2–1	1–0	1–0	1–1	3–1	1–0
La Serena	0–0	0–0	2–1	1–1	0–2	1–2		0–5	2–2	1–1	2–1	1–0	4–1	0–1	1–3	3–4
Magallanes	3–1	2–0	5–3	1–4	1–1	0–0	2–0		1–0	2–2	5–2	2–0	0–0	0–1	1–1	3–1
Naval	2–1	3–1	2–0	0–0	0–0	2–1	4–0	2–1		4–3	4–1	4–1	5–1	3–1	0–0	2–1
O'Higgins	1–2	3–1	0–1	1–1	1–0	4–0	2–1	2–2	0–0		0–1	0–1	3–3	1–0	2–2	3–1
Palestino	1–1	0–1	1–2	0–0	0–0	1–1	1–0	0–0	2–4	1–2		1–1	1–2	1–1	0–3	0–0
Rangers	1–0	0–1	2–2	2–1	0–2	2–1	1–2	0–5	2–0	2–3	0–0		1–1	1–6	1–5	0–2
S. Morning	0–4	1–2	0–1	0–2	0–2	1–4	0–0	1–2	0–2	1–1	0–2	9–1		2–3	0–2	1–0
U. Católica	4–1	2–0	3–1	2–1	1–1	3–1	0–0	0–1	2–2	2–1	1–2	3–0	3–3		2–3	2–2
U. de Chile	2–1	3–0	2–1	1–0	0–1	2–0	2–0	4–4	1–1	2–2	1–1	2–1	2–1	1–1		7–3
U. Española	1–0	0–2	2–0	1–4	0–3	1–1	2–1	1–6	2–1	0–0	1–0	7–2	0–4	1–1	2–0	

Legend: Blue = home team win; Yellow = draw; Red = away team win.

== Topscorer ==
Name	Team	Goals
(Uruguay) Jorge Luis Siviero	Cobreloa	18

== Liguilla Pre-Copa Libertadores ==
2 February 1983	Universidad de Chile	3 – 1	Naval	Estadio Nacional, Santiago
	Liminha 41'; Mosquera 49'; Gamboa 58'		47' Flores	Attendance: 42,236; Referee: M. Lira

2 February 1983	Colo-Colo	0 – 0	Magallanes	Estadio Nacional, Santiago
				Attendance: 42,236; Referee: J. Silvagno

5 February 1983	Magallanes	0 – 1	Naval	Estadio Nacional, Santiago
			77' Aravena	Attendance: 62,077; Referee: V. Ojeda

5 February 1983	Colo-Colo	3 – 2	Universidad de Chile	Estadio Nacional, Santiago
	Caszely 1'; Ormeño 46', 53'		26' Gamboa; 38' Socías	Attendance: 62,077; Referee: G. Castro

8 February 1983	Universidad de Chile	4 – 1	Magallanes	Estadio Nacional, Santiago
	Gálvez 24'; Socías 49'; Own-goal 58'; Mosquera 64'		88' Jáuregui	Attendance: 46,496; Referee: G. Budge

8 February 1983	Colo-Colo	2 – 0	Naval	Estadio Nacional, Santiago
	Caszely 43'; Rivas 89'			Attendance: 46,496; Referee: S. Vásquez

Pos	Team	Pld	W	D	L	GF	GA	GD	Pts	Qualification
1	Colo-Colo	3	2	1	0	5	2	+3	5	Qualified to 1983 Copa Libertadores
2	Universidad de Chile	3	2	0	1	9	5	+4	4	
3	Magallanes	3	1	1	1	2	4	−2	3	
4	Naval	3	0	0	3	1	6	−5	0	

Source: rsssf.com

== Promotion/relegation Liguilla ==
Pos	Team	Pld	W	D	L	GF	GA	GD	Pts	Qualification
1	Unión Española	3	2	1	0	6	3	+3	5	Remains in Primera División
2	Palestino	3	2	0	1	7	5	+2	4	Remains in Primera División
3	Unión La Calera	3	1	0	2	3	6	−3	2	Remains in Segunda División
4	Cobresal	3	0	1	2	1	3	−2	1	Remains in Segunda División

Source: rsssf.com

== See also ==
- 1982 Copa Polla Gol
