= Jorge Siviero =

Uruguayan footballer and coach (born 1952)

Personal information
- Full name: Jorge Luis Siviero Vlahussich
- Date of birth: 13 May 1952 (age 74)
- Place of birth: Montevideo, Uruguay
- Position: Forward

Youth career
- Racing Montevideo

Senior career*
Years	Team	Apps	(Gls)
1969–1971	Racing Montevideo		
1972	Cerro		
1973–1977	Rentistas		
1978	Atlético Potosino		
1979	Deportivo Neza		
1980	Sud América		
1981–1984	Cobreloa	112	(60)
1985	Deportes Arica	31	(9)
1986	Cobreloa	0	(0)

International career
1980	Uruguay	1	(1)

Managerial career
- 1986–1988: Cobreloa
- 1990: Deportes Antofagasta
- 1990: Rangers
- 1991: Deportes Concepción
- 1992: Coquimbo Unido
- 1994–1997: Santiago Wanderers
- 1999–2000: Everton
- 2001: Santiago Wanderers B
- 2002: Everton
- 2004: Unión La Calera
- 2004: UA Maracaibo
- 2005: Deportivo Italmaracaibo
- 2007: Deportes Puerto Montt
Medal record
Representing Uruguay
Mundialito
Winner	1980 Uruguay
- * Club domestic league appearances and goals

Jorge Luis Siviero Vlahussich (born 13 May 1952) is a former Uruguayan football player and coach. He has played for several clubs in Uruguay, Mexico and Chile during his playing career. He also coached almost ten Chilean clubs and two Venezuelan clubs during his managerial career.

On 8 December 1980, he scored a goal in Uruguay's 6–0 friendly win against Finland, which turned out to be his only appearance for the national team. He was an unused member of Uruguay squad which won 1980 Mundialito.

== Titles (Player) ==
- Cobreloa 1982 (Chilean Championship) and 1986 (Copa Chile)

== Titles (Coach) ==
- (Chile) Cobreloa 1986 (Copa Polla Gol)
- (Chile) Deportes Antofagasta 1990 (Torneo Apertura Primera B)
- (Chile) Santiago Wanderers 1995 (Primera B)

== Honours ==
- (Chile) Cobreloa 1982 (Top Scorer Chilean Championship)
