= Eduardo Quintanilla =

Chilean footballer

Personal information
- Full name: Santiago Eduardo Quintanilla Ureta
- Date of birth: 30 July 1948 (age 78)
- Place of birth: Chile
- Position: Midfielder

Senior career*
Years	Team	Apps	(Gls)
- Colo-Colo
- Deportes Ovalle
1972	Palestino		
- Motagua
- CD Olimpia
–1977	CD Águila		
1977–1982	AD San Carlos		

Managerial career
- AD San Carlos (reserves)
- * Club domestic league appearances and goals

Santiago Eduardo Quintanilla Ureta (born 30 July 1948), known as Eduardo Quintanilla, is a Chilean former footballer who played as a midfielder. Besides Chile, he developed his career in Central America.

== Career ==
A midfielder from Colo-Colo, Quintanilla also played for Deportes Ovalle and Palestino in his homeland, winning the 1972 Segunda División de Chile with the second.

He emigrated to Central America and played in Nicaragua, Honduras, Panama, El Salvador and Costa Rica. In Honduras, he played for Motagua and CD Olimpia. In El Salvador, he played for Águila before arriving to Costa Rica and joining San Carlos in December 1977, where he played until 1982.

Considered a historical player of AD San Carlos, where he made up a well remembered pair alongside William Ávila, he won two league titles of the Segunda División in 1977 and 1978.

In the Costa Rican Primera División, he scored nine goals in total, becoming the Chilean top goalscorer in that country.

He retired from football due to a serious traffic accident at the age of thirty three. After, he coached the AD San Carlos reserve team for a brief stint with Toribio Rojas as head coach.

== Personal life ==
He was nicknamed Chucha, as a profanity widely used in his country of birth to express surprise, among other uses.

He made his home in Costa Rica and has worked for the Maracana sports complex in Quesada, San Carlos.

== Honours ==
Palestino

- Segunda División de Chile: 1972

San Carlos

- Segunda División de Costa Rica (2): 1977, 1978
