= Jorge Deschamps =

Chilean footballer (born 1984)

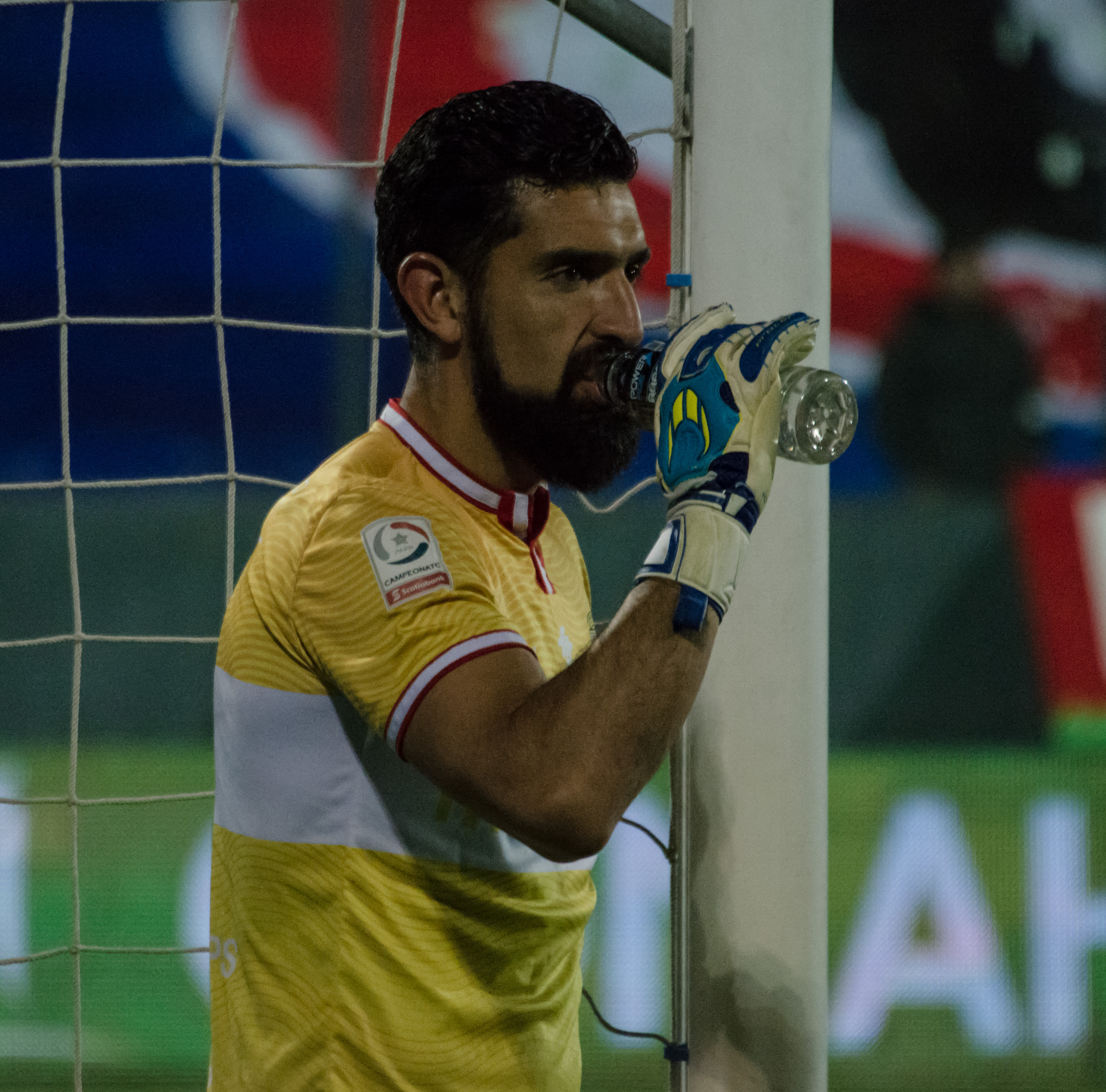
- Deschamps with Curicó Unido in 2018

Personal information
- Full name: Jorge Luis Deschamps Méndez
- Date of birth: 13 May 1984 (age 42)
- Place of birth: Santiago, Chile
- Height: 1.85 m (6 ft 1 in)
- Position: Goalkeeper

Youth career
- Huachipato

Senior career*
Years	Team	Apps	(Gls)
2002–2005	Huachipato	1	(0)
2005	Naval	2	(0)
2006	Deportes Valdivia	–	(–)
2007–2012	Ñublense	12	(0)
2011	→ Deportes Concepción (loan)	19	(0)
2012	→ San Marcos (loan)	1	(0)
2013–2014	Cobresal	6	(0)
2014–2015	Everton	0	(0)
2015–2019	Curicó Unido	77	(0)
2020	Cobresal	6	(0)
2021	Rangers	29	(0)
2022–2023	Cobresal	8	(0)
2023–2024	Magallanes	15	(0)
2025	O'Higgins	3	(0)
Total		179	(0)
- * Club domestic league appearances and goals

Jorge Luis Deschamps Méndez (born 13 May 1984) is a Chilean former professional footballer who played as a goalkeeper.

== Career ==
Deschamps started his career with Huachipato. At league level, he made an appearance in the 2004 season.

Deschamps joined O'Higgins for the 2025 season.

In January 2026, Deschamps announced his retirement and assumed as secretary of SIFUP, the trade union for professional association footballers in Chile.

== Personal life ==
Deschamps has French ancestors, specifically his great-grandparents, who arrived as migrants to South America.

== Career statistics ==
As of match played 9 November 2025

Appearances and goals by club, season and competition
Club	Season	League			National Cup		Continental		Other		Total	
Club	Season	Division	Apps	Goals	Apps	Goals	Apps	Goals	Apps	Goals	Apps	Goals
O'Higgins	2025	Liga de Primera	2	0	0	0	0	0	0	0	2	0
Career total			2	0	0	0	0	0	0	0	2	0
