= Juan Soto (footballer, born 1956) =

Chilean footballer

Personal information
- Full name: Juan Ernesto Soto Quintana
- Date of birth: 25 June 1956 (age 70)
- Place of birth: Santiago, Chile
- Position: Midfielder

Senior career*
Years	Team	Apps	(Gls)
1973	Universidad de Chile		
1974	Everton		
1975	Ñublense		
1976–1979	Universidad de Chile		
1980	Deportes Arica		
1981–1984	Deportes Naval		
1985	Colo-Colo		
1985–1987	Deportes Naval		
1988–1989	Colo-Colo		
1989–1990	Morelia		
1990–1991	Universidad de Chile		

International career
1977–1988	Chile	20	(1)
- * Club domestic league appearances and goals

Juan Ernesto Soto Quintana (born 25 June 1956) is a Chilean former professional footballer who played as a midfielder.

== International career ==
Soto played in 20 matches for the Chile national team from 1977 to 1988. He was also part of Chile's squad for the 1983 Copa América tournament.

== Honours ==
Universidad de Chile

- Copa Polla Gol: 1979

Colo-Colo

- Primera División: 1989
- Copa Digeder: 1989

Chile

- Copa del Pacífico: 1983
