= Erick Wiemberg =

Chilean footballer (born 1994)

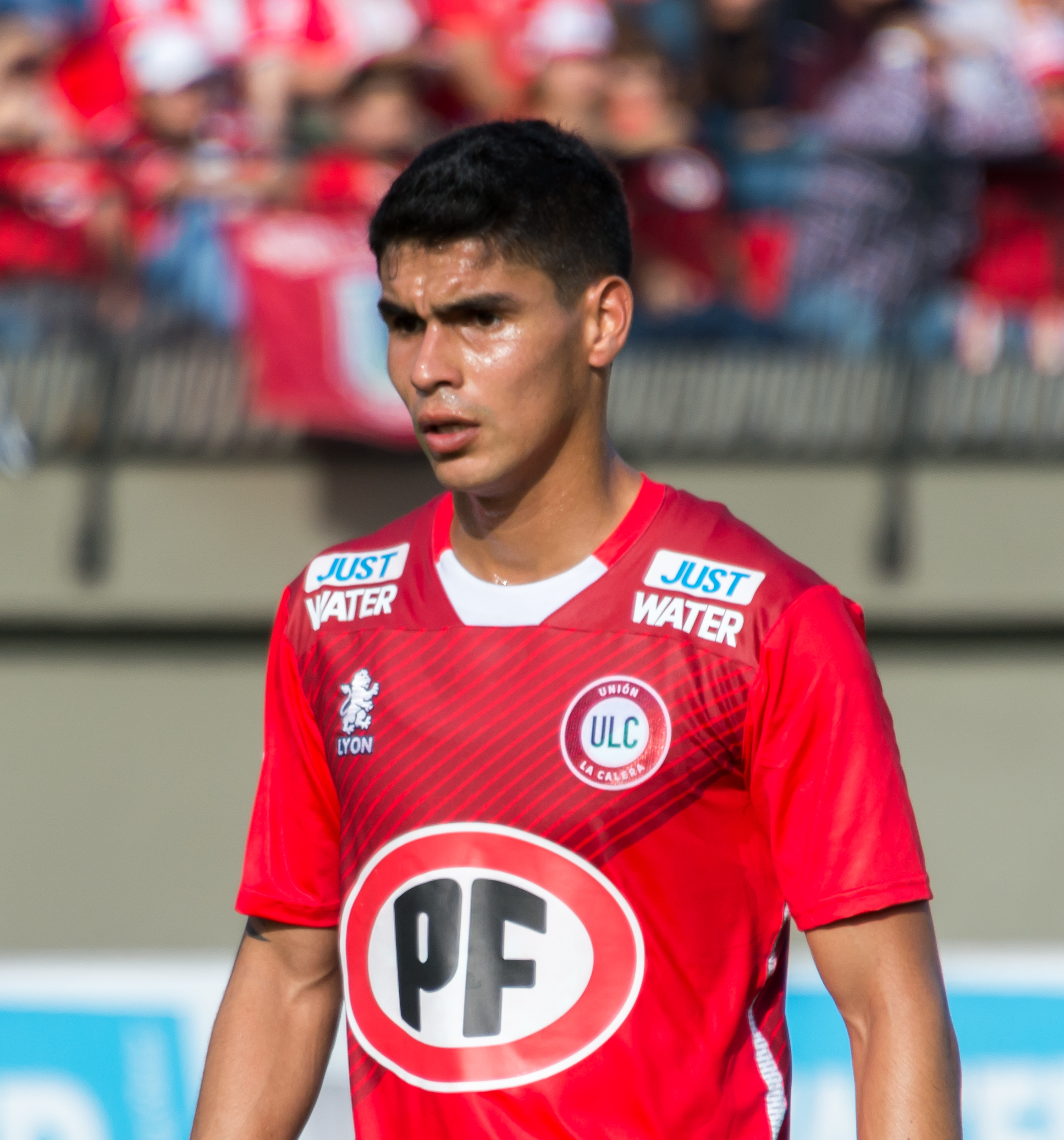
- Wiemberg with Unión La Calera in 2019

Personal information
- Full name: Erick Andrés Wiemberg Higuera
- Date of birth: 20 June 1994 (age 32)
- Place of birth: Valdivia, Chile
- Height: 1.77 m (5 ft 10 in)
- Position: Defender

Team information
- Current team: Colo-Colo
- Number: 21

Youth career
- –2013: Deportes Valdivia

Senior career*
Years	Team	Apps	(Gls)
2013–2020	Deportes Valdivia	157	(9)
2019	→ Unión La Calera (loan)	19	(0)
2020–2025	Unión La Calera	49	(0)
2023–2024	→ Colo-Colo (loan)	45	(5)
2025–	Colo-Colo	37	(1)

International career^{‡}
2021–	Chile	2	(0)
- * Club domestic league appearances and goals as of 13 September 2026 ‡ National team caps and goals as of 8 February 2025

Erick Andrés Wiemberg Higuera (born 20 June 1994) is a Chilean professional footballer who plays as a left-back for Liga de Primera club Colo-Colo and the Chile national team.

== Club career ==
=== Deportes Valdivia ===
He began his career playing for Deportes Valdivia at the Segunda División, the third level of the Chilean football. Along with Valdivia, he obtained the promotion to the Primera B after winning the 2015–16 season. Playing at the Primera B, he stayed at the club until July 2020 - loaned to Unión La Calera during 2019 season - solving a judicial conflict with It.

=== Unión La Calera ===
On 2019 season, he played on loan from Valdivia at the cement club in Primera División, appearing also in three Copa Sudamericana matches against Chapecoense and Atlético Mineiro.

After a contract conflict between Deportes Valdivia and Unión La Calera, he played for Valdivia during the first half of the 2020 Primera B, going back to La Calera in July 2020.

== International career ==
After being called up to training microcycles of the Chile senior team by both Reinaldo Rueda and Martín Lasarte, he made his international debut at the friendly match against Bolivia on 26 March 2021.

== Career statistics ==
=== International ===
As of match played 8 February 2025

Appearances and goals by national team and year
National team	Year	Apps	Goals
Chile	2021	1	0
Chile	2022	0	0
Chile	2023	0	0
Chile	2024	0	0
Chile	2025	1	0
Total		2	0

== Honours ==
Deportes Valdivia

- Chilean Segunda División: 2015–16
