= Braulio Brizuela =

Paraguayan-born Chilean footballer (born 1988)

Personal information
- Full name: Braulio Brizuela Benítez
- Date of birth: 24 August 1988 (age 38)
- Place of birth: Asunción, Paraguay
- Height: 1.73 m (5 ft 8 in)
- Position: Forward

Youth career
- Colo-Colo
- Universidad Católica

Senior career*
Years	Team	Apps	(Gls)
2007–2015	Universidad Católica	1	(0)
2007	→ Provincial Osorno (loan)	32	(12)
2008	→ Santiago Wanderers (loan)	13	(0)
2009	→ Universidad Católica (ECU) (loan)	17	(1)
2010–2012	→ Curicó Unido (loan)	48	(8)
2013	→ Deportes Puerto Montt (loan)	8	(4)
2014	→ San Marcos (loan)	6	(0)
2014–2015	→ Lota Schwager (loan)	27	(2)
Total		152	(27)
- * Club domestic league appearances and goals

Braulio Brizuela Benítez (born 24 August 1988) is a Paraguayan naturalized Chilean former footballer who played in Chile and Ecuador.

== Club career ==
As a child, Brizuela was with the Colo-Colo youth ranks, then he switched to Universidad Católica football academy, where he started his career, before moving (on loan) to Provincial Osorno in 2007. There, he had a well season, helping the team to won the Primera B title, and thereby the promotion to 2008 Primera División de Chile season. He was a key player scoring thirteen goals in thirty two matches.

In January 2009, Brizuela joined Ecuadorian Serie B side Club Deportivo Universidad Católica del Ecuador on loan. One more time, he was a key player in a promotion tournament, scoring now 11 goals. The incoming year he again was sent on loan, but now returning to Chile to join Curicó Unido. He played two seasons there, but with an unsuccessful performance.

On 24 January 2013, he joined Deportes Puerto Montt on loan.

=== Return to Universidad Católica ===
In mid-2013, he returned to Universidad Católica.

On 29 September 2013, he made his league debut for Católica in a 2–2 away draw with Deportes Iquique at Estadio Tierra de Campeones for Torneo Apertura's ninth week.

On 13 December 2013, he was sent-on in the 69' minute, again in a match with Deportes Iquique (in a new 2–2 draw at Tierra de Campeones) for the League's qualification playoffs to the 2014 Copa Libertadores. He didn't appear in the next game where Católica was eliminated by Iquique in the shootout following draw 1–1 at San Carlos de Apoquindo.

=== San Marcos de Arica ===
In early 2014, he was sent on loan to San Marcos de Arica. On 5 January, he debuted for Arica as a starter in a 1–0 home win over Magallanes: the centre back Luis Alegría on 33rd minute. However, in that match Brizuela only played 28 minutes being replaced by playmaker Renato González. Around the Torneo Clausura Primera B, he only played six games and didn't scored goals. On 15 May, the team achieved its promotion.

=== Lota Schwager ===
On 8 August 2014, it was reported that Brizuela was loaned to Lota Schwager.

=== Retirement ===
His last clubs were San Marcos de Arica and Lota Schwager. After not joining any club, he officially retired in 2016.

== Personal life ==
He is the younger brother of Paraguayan international Hugo Brizuela.

He acquired the Chilean nationality by residence.

After his retirement, he went to Europe alongside Mauricio Isla, staying in France and Italy for a few years. Back in Chile, he has worked for applications such as Cornershop and Uber.

== Honors ==
=== Club ===
Provincial Osorno

- Primera B de Chile (1): 2007

San Marcos de Arica

- Primera B de Chile (1): 2014 Clausura
