= Román Tello =

Chilean footballer (born 1994)

Personal information
- Full name: Román Ignacio Tello Olivares
- Date of birth: November 2, 1994 (age 32)
- Place of birth: Ovalle, Chile
- Positions: Left back; left midfielder

Team information
- Current team: Nyköpings BIS

Youth career
- Academia Kico Rojas
- Coquimbo Unido

Senior career*
Years	Team	Apps	(Gls)
2012–2015	Coquimbo Unido	0	(0)
2014–2015	→ Deportes Ovalle (loan)	7	(0)
2016	AIK	0	(0)
2016	Vasalund	4	(0)
2017	Karlberg	23	(0)
2018	Nässjö	21	(0)
2019	Värnamo	19	(0)
2020–2021	Assyriska Turabdin	39	(0)
2022–	Nyköpings BIS	–	(–)
- * Club domestic league appearances and goals as of 18:13, 23 September 2021 (UTC)

Román Ignacio Tello Olivares (born November 2, 1994) is a Chilean footballer who currently plays for Swedish club Nyköpings BIS as a left back.

== Career ==
Even though he was born in Ovalle, he began his career playing for Coquimbo Unido, a club based in a nearby city to his birthplace, making his debut at the 2012–13 Copa Chile. On 2014–15 season, he was loaned to Deportes Ovalle at the Segunda División, the third level of Chilean football.

After having no chances in Chilean football and studying Management and Business, he decided to look for any chance in Swedish football in late 2015, beginning an ongoing career in that country. In 2020, he joined Ettan Södra club Assyriska IK. In 2022, he joined Nyköpings BIS in the Swedish Division 2.

== Honours ==
=== Club ===
Coquimbo Unido

- Primera B (1): 2014-C (Note: no promotion to Primera División)
