= Eduardo Gómez (footballer) =

Chilean footballer (born 1958)

Personal information
- Full name: Eduardo Hernán Gómez Cortez
- Date of birth: 2 June 1958 (age 68)
- Place of birth: Ovalle, Chile
- Position: Centre-back

Youth career
- Barros Luco
- Ferroviarios Ovalle
- Deportes Ovalle

Senior career*
Years	Team	Apps	(Gls)
1977–1978	Deportes Ovalle	3+	(0+)
1979–1990	Cobreloa	164	(8)
1980	→ Deportes Arica (loan)		
1991	Universidad de Chile	5	(0)
1993–1995	Deportes La Serena	60	(3)
1995–2002	Deportes Ovalle		

International career
1984–1987	Chile	21	(0)
- * Club domestic league appearances and goals

Eduardo Hernán Gómez Cortez (born 2 June 1958), known as Eduardo Gómez, is a former Chilean footballer who played as a centre-back.

== Playing career ==
Gómez stood out as a centre-back for Deportes Ovalle, Cobreloa and the Chile national football team, who he competed with at the 1987 Copa América.

=== Teams ===
- (Chile) Deportes Ovalle 1977–1978
- (Chile) Cobreloa 1979
- (Chile) Deportes Arica 1980
- (Chile) Cobreloa 1981–1990
- Universidad de Chile 1991
- (Chile) Deportes La Serena 1993–1995
- (Chile) Deportes Ovalle 1995–2002

== Coaching career ==
Eduardo and his brother Osvaldo owns a football academy in his hometown, Ovalle.

== Personal life ==
Eduardo is the brother of the footballers, Rubén, the eldest, Osvaldo, who won the silver medal with Chile at the 1987 Pan American Games, and Omar Gómez. Eduardo, Rubén and Omar played for Cobreloa. His father, Eduardo Sr., played football at amateur level for Magallanes from Sotaquí and Ferroviarios Ovalle.

He is known by his nicknamed Mocho (Almost Hairless) due to his buzz cut when he was a child.

== Honours ==
Cobreloa

- Chilean Primera División (3): 1982, 1985, 1988
- Copa Chile (1): 1986

Individual

- Chilean Primera División Best player: 1985
