= Omar Gómez =

Omar Gómez may refer to:

- Omar "Indio" Gómez (1955–2011), Argentine football manager and former midfielder
- Omar Gómez (footballer, born 1965), Argentine-Paraguayan football midfielder
- Omar Gómez (footballer, born 1966), Chilean football midfielder
- Omar Gómez (footballer, born 1980), Mexican football manager and former forward
