= 1989 Copa Invierno =

The Copa Invierno 1989 was an official Chilean Cup tournament, whose purpose was to maintain clubs in activity during the 1989 Copa América and 1990 FIFA World Cup qualification (CONMEBOL) recess. The competition started on July 15, 1989, and concluded on August 15, 1989. U. Española won the competition, beating Huachipato 2–0 in the final. Played in mid-1989, the tournament was the second official cup competition of the 1989 season.

== Calendar ==
Round	Date
Group Round	15–29 July 1989
Quarterfinals	5 August 1989
Semi-finals	12 August 1989
Final	15 August 1989

== Group round ==
=== Group 1 ===
D. Iquique	1–0	Cobresal
D. La Serena	1–0	Cobreloa
Cobreloa	3–2	D. Iquique
D. La Serena	1–0	Cobresal
Cobreloa	3–1	Cobresal
D. La Serena	1–0	D. Iquique

Rank	Team	Points
1	Deportes La Serena	6
2	Cobreloa	4
3	Deportes Iquique	2
4	Cobresal	0

=== Group 2 ===
Everton	1–0	U. San Felipe
Colo-Colo	1–3	U. Española
Colo-Colo	4–1	U. San Felipe
Everton	2–2	U. Española
Everton	2–0	Colo-Colo
U. Española	0–1	U. San Felipe

Rank	Team	Points
1	Everton	5
2	Unión Española	4
3	Colo-Colo	2
4	Unión San Felipe	2

=== Group 3 ===
U. Católica	6–1	D. Valdivia
O'Higgins	0–2	Rangers
O'Higgins	5–2	D. Valdivia
Rangers	1–2	U. Católica
Rangers	1–1	D. Valdivia
U. Católica	3–0	O'Higgins

Rank	Team	Points
1	Universidad Católica	6
2	Rangers	3
3	O'Higgins	2
4	Deportes Valdivia	1

=== Group 4 ===
Huachipato	2–2	D. Concepción
Naval	1–1	F. Vial
Huachipato	4–1	F. Vial
Naval	2–0	D. Concepción
D. Concepción	1–0	F. Vial
Huachipato	1–1	Naval

Rank	Team	Points
1	Huachipato	4 (+3)
2	Naval	4 (+2)
3	Deportes Concepción	3
4	Fernández Vial	1

== Quarterfinals ==
Home team	Score	Away team
Deportes La Serena	1–3	Unión Española
Universidad Católica	2–0	Naval
Everton	2–0	Cobreloa
Huachipato	1–0	Rangers

== Semifinals ==
August 12, 1989

Everton	1 – 2	Huachipato
Damiano 86'		Maturana 35', 62'

Estadio Sausalito, Viña del Mar
Attendance: 1,745
Referee: E. Marin

August 12, 1989

Universidad Católica	3 – 4	Unión Española
L. Pérez 50' (pen.), 85' (pen.); Barrera 67'		Córdova 39'; Gutiérrez 52', 65'; Sierra 58'

Estadio San Carlos de Apoquindo, Santiago
Attendance: 5,598
Referee: J. Massardo

== Final ==
August 15, 1989

Unión Española	2 – 0	Huachipato
Sierra 56'; Gutiérrez 84'

Estadio Santa Laura, Santiago
Attendance: 3,300
Referee: S. Imperatore

== Top goalscorer ==
- Luis Pérez (U. Católica) 10 goals

== See also ==
- 1989 Campeonato Nacional
- 1989 Copa Digeder

== Sources ==
- Revista Minuto 90 (Santiago, Chile) July–August 1989, (National Library of Chile)
