= 2000 Campeonato Nacional Primera División =

Campeonato Nacional Copa Banco del Estado
- Dates: 15 April – 17 December 2000
- Champions: Universidad de Chile (11th title)
- Relegated: Everton; Provincial Osorno
- 2001 Copa Libertadores: Universidad de Chile; Cobreloa; Deportes Concepción (Liguilla winners)
- Matches: 240
- Goals: 697 (2.9 per match)
- Top goalscorer: Pedro González (26)
- Total attendance: 1,126,416
- Average attendance: 4,693

The 2000 Campeonato Nacional, known as Campeonato Nacional Copa Banco del Estado 2000 for sponsorship purposes, was the 69th season of top-flight football in Chile. Universidad de Chile won their 11th title. Cobreloa and Deportes Concepción -as Liguilla winners-, also qualified for the next Copa Libertadores.

== Standings ==
| Pos | Team | Pld | W | D | L | GF | GA | GD | Pts | Qualification or relegation |
|---|---|---|---|---|---|---|---|---|---|---|
| 1 | Universidad de Chile | 30 | 18 | 7 | 5 | 62 | 27 | +35 | 61 | Champions. Qualified to 2001 Copa Libertadores |
| 2 | Cobreloa | 30 | 15 | 7 | 8 | 35 | 18 | +17 | 52 | Qualify to 2001 Copa Libertadores |
| 3 | Colo-Colo | 30 | 13 | 10 | 7 | 58 | 46 | +12 | 49 | |
| 4 | Unión Española | 30 | 13 | 9 | 8 | 43 | 38 | +5 | 48 | |
| 5 | Deportes Concepción | 30 | 11 | 11 | 8 | 51 | 42 | +9 | 44 | Qualify to Liguilla Pre-Copa Libertadores |
| 6 | Universidad Católica | 30 | 11 | 10 | 9 | 28 | 30 | −2 | 43 | Qualify to Liguilla Pre-Copa Libertadores |
| 7 | Santiago Wanderers | 30 | 10 | 11 | 9 | 47 | 46 | +1 | 41 | |
| 8 | Audax Italiano | 30 | 11 | 7 | 12 | 38 | 34 | +4 | 40 | Qualify to Liguilla Pre-Copa Libertadores |
| 9 | Palestino | 30 | 11 | 7 | 12 | 45 | 44 | +1 | 40 | |
| 10 | Santiago Morning | 30 | 10 | 8 | 12 | 47 | 54 | −7 | 38 | Qualify to Liguilla Pre-Copa Libertadores |
| 11 | Coquimbo Unido | 30 | 10 | 7 | 13 | 36 | 47 | −11 | 37 | |
| 12 | O'Higgins | 30 | 10 | 6 | 14 | 43 | 52 | −9 | 36 | |
| 13 | Huachipato | 30 | 9 | 7 | 14 | 44 | 48 | −4 | 34 | |
| 14 | Deportes Puerto Montt | 30 | 9 | 6 | 15 | 42 | 54 | −12 | 33 | |
| 15 | Everton | 30 | 8 | 9 | 13 | 41 | 53 | −12 | 33 | Relegation to Primera B |
| 16 | Provincial Osorno | 30 | 5 | 8 | 17 | 37 | 64 | −27 | 23 | Relegation to Primera B |

== Scores ==
| Home \ Away | AUD | CLO | COL | DCO | COQ | EVE | HUA | OHI | POS | PAL | DPM | SMO | UCA | UCH | UES | SWA |
|---|---|---|---|---|---|---|---|---|---|---|---|---|---|---|---|---|
| Audax | | 4–1 | 0–1 | 1–1 | 4–0 | 2–0 | 2–0 | 1–0 | 2–0 | 1–3 | 1–2 | 0–0 | 1–2 | 0–0 | 1–0 | 1–3 |
| Cobreloa | 2–1 | | 2–1 | 2–0 | 2–2 | 2–0 | 3–2 | 3–1 | 3–0 | 0–0 | 6–1 | 2–0 | 1–1 | 1–0 | 3–0 | 4–2 |
| Colo-Colo | 1–0 | 2–2 | | 2–2 | 3–3 | 5–0 | 1–1 | 2–1 | 2–2 | 0–2 | 2–1 | 5–0 | 3–3 | 1–3 | 0–0 | 1–1 |
| Concepción | 1–1 | 2–1 | 1–2 | | 1–1 | 0–2 | 1–0 | 1–0 | 2–1 | 1–0 | 1–0 | 1–1 | 1–0 | 1–2 | 3–2 | 2–0 |
| Coquimbo | 0–1 | 1–1 | 2–1 | 1–1 | | 1–0 | 3–2 | 3–0 | 1–0 | 3–1 | 3–2 | 3–1 | 0–2 | 0–0 | 1–2 | 3–1 |
| Everton | 2–1 | 3–2 | 1–2 | 0–0 | 2–1 | | 2–2 | 3–2 | 2–2 | 0–2 | 4–0 | 2–2 | 2–2 | 0–3 | 1–1 | 1–1 |
| Huachipato | 2–1 | 1–2 | 2–1 | 0–1 | 2–0 | 2–0 | | 3–2 | 2–2 | 1–1 | 2–0 | 1–2 | 1–4 | 1–2 | 2–3 | 1–1 |
| O'Higgins | 0–1 | 2–1 | 1–3 | 3–2 | 2–2 | 4–3 | 3–2 | | 2–1 | 2–2 | 3–2 | 2–4 | 1–1 | 2–0 | 0–2 | 3–0 |
| Osorno | 2–4 | 2–1 | 0–1 | 0–1 | 0–0 | 2–0 | 1–1 | 1–1 | | 2–0 | 2–0 | 3–1 | 1–2 | 1–1 | 1–3 | 1–4 |
| Palestino | 2–3 | 1–1 | 2–4 | 2–1 | 3–0 | 1–0 | 2–3 | 1–2 | 5–1 | | 1–1 | 1–4 | 0–2 | 3–1 | 1–4 | 2–0 |
| P. Montt | 2–0 | 0–0 | 2–2 | 2–0 | 1–1 | 4–3 | 1–3 | 1–0 | 3–0 | 1–1 | | 5–1 | 1–1 | 1–1 | 0–1 | 4–2 |
| S. Morning | 2–0 | 1–0 | 4–3 | 2–0 | 1–0 | 1–2 | 2–1 | 3–0 | 3–3 | 0–3 | 2–3 | | 3–0 | 1–6 | 0–0 | 0–0 |
| U. Católica | 1–1 | 3–1 | 1–3 | 0–0 | 0–0 | 1–2 | 2–2 | 1–3 | 2–1 | 3–0 | 5–0 | 3–2 | | 1–2 | 2–3 | 3–0 |
| U. Chile | 1–1 | 3–1 | 3–1 | 0–1 | 6–1 | 2–1 | 2–1 | 2–0 | 5–2 | 1–2 | 2–0 | 2–1 | 0–0 | | 3–0 | 1–1 |
| U. Española | 2–1 | 0–2 | 1–2 | 0–0 | 2–0 | 2–2 | 1–0 | 0–0 | 5–1 | 0–0 | 1–0 | 1–1 | 3–3 | 1–2 | | 3–2 |
| S. Wanderers | 1–1 | 0–1 | 1–1 | 2–1 | 3–0 | 1–1 | 1–0 | 1–1 | 5–2 | 2–1 | 3–2 | 1–1 | 4–0 | 0–6 | 4–0 | |

Legend: Blue = home team win; Yellow = draw; Red = away team win.

== Liguilla Pre-Copa Libertadores ==
=== Semifinals ===
| 19 December 2000 | Deportes Concepción | 1 – 0 (a.e.t.) | Audax Italiano | Estadio Fiscal de Talca |
| | Vargas 118' | | | Attendance: 1,390; Referee: M. Sánchez |

| 19 December 2000 | Universidad Católica | 2 – 1 | Santiago Morning | Estadio Nacional |
| | Madrid 38'; Gorosito 55' | | 71' Ferrero | Attendance: 4,000; Referee: C. Chandía |

=== Final ===
| 21 December 2000 | Deportes Concepción | 3 – 2 (a.e.t.) | Universidad Católica | Estadio Fiscal de Talca |
| | 18' 29' Pozo; 97' Chavarría | | 76' Norambuena; 90' Brizuela | Attendance: 5,082; Referee: G. Aros |

Deportes Concepción qualified for the 2001 Copa Libertadores

== See also ==
- 2000 Copa Apertura
