= Adolfo Rodríguez (footballer) =

Uruguayan football player and manager

Personal information
- Full name: Adolfo Rodríguez Barreto
- Date of birth: 11 October 1917
- Place of birth: Colonia del Sacramento, Uruguay
- Date of death: 18 July 1994 (aged 76)
- Place of death: Santiago, Chile
- Position: Defender

Youth career
- Peñarol

Senior career*
Years	Team	Apps	(Gls)
1937–1939	Peñarol		
1940	Racing Montevideo		
1941	Peñarol		
1942–1944	Racing Montevideo		
1945	Fluminense	6	(0)
1946	Bonsucesso		
1947	Pelotas		
1948–1950	Santiago Wanderers		
1951	Green Cross		
1952–1956	Everton		
1957	Deportes La Serena		

Managerial career
- 1958–1959: Deportes La Serena
- 1961: Ñublense
- 1962: Deportes La Serena
- 1963–1966: Rangers
- 1967: Everton
- 1968: Palestino
- 1970: Deportes Ovalle
- 1972: Palestino
- 1973: Deportes Ovalle
- 1974: San Luis
- 1974: Santiago Wanderers
- 1975–1976: Rangers
- 1976: Audax Italiano
- 1978: Deportes Ovalle
- 1979: Trasandino
- 1981: Deportes Ovalle
- 1984: Iván Mayo
- * Club domestic league appearances and goals

Adolfo Rodríguez Barreto (11 October 1917 – 18 July 1994) was a Uruguayan football back and manager.

== Playing career ==
A defender, Rodríguez started his career in his homeland with Peñarol and Racing Club de Montevideo. From 1945 to 1947, he played in Brazil for Fluminense, Bonsucesso and Pelotas.

Moving to Chile in 1948, Rodríguez spent seasons with Santiago Wanderers, Green Cross and Everton de Viña del Mar in the top division and ended his career with Deportes La Serena winning the 1957 Segunda División.

== Coaching career ==
As a football manager, Rodríguez developed all his career in Chile. In Chilean Primera División, he led Deportes La Serena, Rangers de Talca, Everton de Viña del Mar, Palestino and Santiago Wanderers.

In Chilean Segunda División, Rodríguez coached Ñublense, Deportes Ovalle, Palestino, San Luis de Quillota, Audax Italiano, Trasandino and Iván Mayo.

Rodríguez won the 1972 Segunda División with Palestino.
