= 1989 Copa Digeder =

Tournament details
- Country: Chile
- Teams: 40

Final positions
- Champions: Colo-Colo
- Runners-up: Universidad Católica
- Semifinalists: Deportes Valdivia; O'Higgins

Tournament statistics
- Top goal scorer: Eric Lecaros (Deportes Valdivia) 16 goals

The 1989 Copa Digeder was the 19th edition of the Chilean Cup tournament. The competition started on March 4, 1989, and concluded on July 9, 1989. first and second level teams took part in the tournament. Colo-Colo won the competition for their seventh time, beating Universidad Católica 1–0 in the final. The points system in the first round awarded 3 points for a win. In the event of a tie, each team was awarded 1 point, and an additional point was awarded to the winner of a penalty shoot-out.

== Calendar ==
Round	Date
Group Round	4 March 1989; 18 June 1989
Quarterfinals	25–29 June 1989
Semi-finals	2–5 July 1989
Finals	9 July 1989

== Group Round ==
Key to colours in group tables
Teams that progressed to the Quarterfinals

=== Group A ===
	DARI	DIQU	CLOA	DANT	CSAL	RATA	DLSE	COQU	DOVA	ULCA
D. Arica		1–1 (4-3 p)	3–2	1–1 (2-3 p)	4–1	1–1 (0-3 p)	0–1	4–0	1–0	2–0
D. Iquique	3–1		1–0	0–0 (7-8 p)	2–2 (3-2 p)	5–2	2–0	1–0	1–1 (3-4 p)	0–0 (4-3 p)
Cobreloa	1–0	2–1		1–0	1–1 (2-3 p)	0–0 (5-4 p)	1–0	3–0	3–0	0–0 (3-4 p)
D. Antofagasta	2–1	1–1 (6-5 p)	1–2		0–0 (4-5 p)	5–2	0–0 (8-7 p)	2–0	4–0	4–1
Cobresal	4–0	1–1 (4-2 p)	2–0	3–1		2–2 (3-4 p)	5–0	2–1	1–1 (4-3 p)	1–0
R. Atacama	3–1	1–1 (5-3 p)	2–4	0–1	0–3		1–1 (5-6 p)	1–2	0–0 (5-3 p)	1–2
D. La Serena	2–0	0–1	1–0	2–1	1–1 (4-5 p)	1–1 (3-4 p)		1–0	0–1	2–2 (1-3 p)
Coquimbo U.	0–0 (5-4 p)	2–0	0–0 (4-3 p)	1–1 (3-4 p)	1–1 (3-4 p)	1–0	0–0 (3-2 p)		3–1	4–1
D. Ovalle	1–1 (4-3 p)	0–1	1–2	0–2	1–3	1–1 (3-0 p)	0–2	1–0		0–0 (2-4 p)
U. La Calera	0–2	0–4	0–3	1–3	2–4	2–5	0–2	0–2	1–1 (1-4 p)	

Rank	Team	Points
1	Cobresal	41
2	Cobreloa	37
3	Deportes Antofagasta	35
4	Deportes Iquique	34
5	Deportes La Serena	28
6	Coquimbo Unido	26
7	Deportes Arica	24
8	Regional Atacama	19
9	Deportes Ovalle	17
10	Unión La Calera	9

=== Group B ===
	SLUI	EVER	SWAN	UCAT	COLO	UCHI	UESP	AUDI	PALE	MAGA
San Luis		3–2	1–1 (6-5 p)	2–1	3–6	1–1 (4-5 p)	0–2	4–2	1–0	0–1
Everton	3–1		2–1	0–3	1–2	1–0	0–1	5–0	0–0 (2-3 p)	2–1
S. Wanderers	2–2 (5-4 p)	0–0 (4-3 p)		0–0 (3-4 p)	0–0 (1-3 p)	2–0	3–1	1–1 (1-4 p)	0–3	1–1 (7-8 p)
U. Católica	4–1	1–1 (4-5 p)	4–2		2–3	0–1	4–1	3–0	6–2	3–2
Colo-Colo	4–0	3–1	1–1 (1-4 p)	0–1		4–0	1–1 (10-9 p)	1–0	2–0	2–0
U. de Chile	3–1	1–0	2–5	1–1 (4-3 p)	1–1 (4-3 p)		2–1	1–0	3–1	0–0 (2-4 p)
U. Española	6–1	5–2	2–2 (7-6 p)	1–1 (4-5 p)	2–2 (4-1 p)	1–2		0–0 (5-6 p)	2–1	1–2
Audax I.	0–1	2–0	1–2	0–3	0–2	2–2 (5-3 p)	0–2		0–1	1–2
Palestino	5–3	5–1	2–0	3–3 (4-3 p)	1–0	0–2	1–3	1–1 (3-5 p)		0–4
Magallanes	1–0	2–1	2–0	0–0 (3-4 p)	2–3	0–0 (2-3 p)	1–3	2–0	0–2	

Rank	Team	Points
1	Colo-Colo	40
2	Universidad Católica	36
3	Universidad de Chile	34
4	Unión Española	31
5	Magallanes	30
6	Palestino	26
7	Santiago Wanderers	24
8	Everton	19 (-9)
9	San Luis	19 (-19)
10	Audax Italiano	11

=== Group C ===
	USFE	CAND	SOIN	OHIG	GVEL	DCOL	CURI	RANG	DLIN	DVAL
U. San Felipe		4–2	3–0	3–4	1–0	4–0	1–1 (7-8 p)	2–0	4–1	1–0
Cobreandino	1–3		4–2	1–4	4–0	0–1	1–2	1–2	1–1 (3-4 p)	0–3
Soinca B.	4–2	1–1 (8-7 p)		0–1	4–3	0–0 (3-5 p)	0–2	0–1	2–1	0–2
O'Higgins	3–1	4–2	4–0		4–1	0–0 (3-5 p)	1–1 (3-0 p)	2–0	2–0	2–0
G. Velásquez	1–1 (4-3 p)	2–1	1–3	1–1 (4-3 p)		2–1	1–2	1–0	1–2	2–2 (4-5 p)
D. Colchagua	1–1 (4-5 p)	2–1	1–1 (1-3 p)	0–1	0–1		0–0 (4-2 p)	3–2	2–0	2–1
Curicó U.	4–0	2–0	1–1 (7-8 p)	1–1 (3-5 p)	5–0	1–1 (3-4 p)		2–1	3–0	0–1
Rangers	1–0	3–0	1–2	1–1 (5-6 p)	4–0	1–1 (2-4 p)	1–0		2–0	2–1
D. Linares	4–2	2–1	0–0 (3-4 p)	1–1 (1-3 p)	1–0	0–3	2–2 (2-4 p)	0–1		0–3
D. Valdivia	1–1 (3-4 p)	5–0	0–0 (5-4 p)	3–2	5–1	4–1	2–1	1–1 (3-5 p)	4–0	

Rank	Team	Points
1	O'Higgins	43
2	Deportes Valdivia	36
3	Curicó Unido	33
4	Rangers	31
5	Unión San Felipe	30 (+6)
6	Deportes Colchagua	30 (-1)
7	Soinca Bata	25
8	General Velásquez	17
9	Deportes Linares	16
10	Cobreandino	8

=== Group D ===
	ÑUBL	HUAC	NAVA	DCON	FVIA	LSCH	IBER	DTEM	POSO	DPMO
Ñublense		1–1 (4-5 p)	2–2 (4-5 p)	2–3	1–2	1–2	4–1	1–0	0–3	1–0
Huachipato	5–0		4–2	0–2	2–2 (3-5 p)	2–3	3–0	2–0	1–2	0–3
Naval	1–2	2–4		2–2 (3-4 p)	0–0 (3-5 p)	3–2	3–0	0–1	1–4	6–1
D. Concepción	1–1 (4-2 p)	0–0 (14-13 p)	5–0		0–0 (6-5 p)	2–2 (0-3 p)	1–0	1–1 (4-2 p)	1–1 (3-4 p)	3–0
A. F. Vial	5–0	1–0	1–0	0–1		1–5	3–0	2–1	0–0 (4-1 p)	0–0 (5-4 p)
Lota S.	0–0 (3-2 p)	2–1	2–0	1–0	2–1		1–1 (6-5 p)	2–2 (3-4 p)	2–2 (3-4 p)	1–1 (0-3 p)
Iberia B.B.	4–1	0–5	0–0 (7-6 p)	0–0 (4-3 p)	2–0	0–1		0–0 (6-5 p)	1–3	2–1
D. Temuco	2–0	1–2	0–0 (5-3 p)	0–3	1–1 (5-6 p)	2–3	1–0		0–0 (4-5 p)	3–1
P. Osorno	1–0	4–1	0–1	0–1	0–1	2–1	2–0	2–0		1–1 (3-4 p)
D. P. Montt	2–1	0–1	2–0	3–3 (2-4 p)	1–1 (4-2 p)	3–2	0–0 (2-4 p)	1–0	0–1	

Rank	Team	Points
1	Deportes Concepción	39
2	Provincial Osorno	38
3	Lota Schwager	36
4	A. Fernández Vial	33
5	Huachipato	28
6	Deportes Puerto Montt	24
7	Deportes Temuco	20
8	Naval	18 (-9)
9	Iberia Bío Bío	18 (-18)
10	Ñublense	16

== Quarterfinals ==
Teams			Scores		Tie-breakers
Team #1	Points	Team #2	1st leg	2nd leg	
Deportes Valdivia	3:3	Cobresal	4–0	0–2	4–2 (g.d.)
Cobreloa	3:3	O'Higgins	0–0 (8-9 p)	0–0 (4-2 p)	3–4 ( pen.)
Provincial Osorno	0:6	Colo-Colo	0–3	0–3	–
Universidad Católica	3:3	Deportes Concepción	3–0	0–3	4–3 ( pen.)

== Semifinals ==
July 2, 1989

Deportes Valdivia	0 – 0 (4–5 p)	Colo-Colo

Parque Municipal, Valdivia
Attendance: 7,533
Referee: S. Imperatore

July 2, 1989

O'Higgins	0 – 0 (4–5 p)	Universidad Católica

Estadio El Teniente, Rancagua
Attendance: 13,176
Referee: S. Vásquez

July 5, 1989

Colo-Colo	4 – 1	Deportes Valdivia
Díaz 23', 67'; Barticciotto 49'; Vilches 90'		58' (pen.) Marcoleta

Estadio Nacional, Santiago
Attendance: 3,502
Referee: J. Massardo

July 5, 1989

Universidad Católica	2 – 1	O'Higgins
Barrera 70'; Reinoso 75'		59' (pen.) Vargas

Estadio San Carlos de Apoquindo, Santiago
Attendance: 3,667
Referee: C. Robles

== Final ==
July 9, 1989

Colo-Colo	1 – 0	Universidad Católica
Dabrowski 15'

Estadio Nacional, Santiago
Attendance: 29,926
Referee: G. Castro

Lineups in the Final

Colo-Colo:
Daniel Morón; Juan Carlos Peralta, Miguel Ramírez, Lizardo Garrido, Alfonso Neculñir, Hugo Bello, Juan Soto, Sergio Díaz, Marcelo Barticciotto, Ricardo Dabrowski, Sergio Salgado (75' Javier Margas).
DT: Arturo Salah.
----------------------------------------------------------------------------------------------
Universidad Católica:
Patricio Toledo; Andrés Romero, Luis Abarca, Pablo Yoma, Carlos Soto, Francisco Hórmann (58' Andrés Olivares), Fabián Estay, Nelson Parraguez, Gerardo Reinoso, Luis Pérez, Rodrigo Barrera (72' Raimundo Tupper).
DT: Ignacio Prieto.

== Top goalscorer ==
- Eric Lecaros (Deportes Valdivia) 16 goals

== See also ==
- 1989 Campeonato Nacional
- 1989 Copa Invierno
- Segunda División
