= Omar Gómez (footballer, born 1966) =

Chilean footballer

Personal information
- Full name: Omar Enrique Gómez Cortez
- Date of birth: 7 March 1966 (age 60)
- Place of birth: Ovalle, Chile
- Position: Midfielder

Youth career
- 1982–1983: Cobreloa

Senior career*
Years	Team	Apps	(Gls)
1983–1994	Cobreloa	87	(3)
1994	Deportes Concepción	7	(0)
1995	Deportes La Serena	7	(0)
1995–1998	Deportes Ovalle		

International career
1985	Chile U20		
- * Club domestic league appearances and goals

Omar Enrique Gómez Cortez (born 7 March 1966) is a Chilean former professional footballer who played as a midfielder.

== Playing career ==
Born in Ovalle, Chile, Gómez moved to Calama and joined the Cobreloa youth ranks at the age of 16. A player for them for over 10 years, he was promoted to the first team in 1983 and made his debut the next year. He took part in the most successful period, winning the Primera División in 1985, 1988 and 1992. They also were the Copa Libertadores runners-up in 1981 and 1982.

Following Cobreloa, Gómez played for Deportes Concepción in the 1994 Segunda División. The next year, he switched to Deportes La Serena.

Gómez ended his career with his hometown's club, Deportes Ovalle from 1995 to 1998. In 1996, he coincided with his brothers Eduardo and Osvaldo.

At international level, Gómez represented Chile at under-20 level in the 1985 South American Championship.

== Coaching career ==
From 2002 to 2004, Gómez served as a football coach for an academy of Chuquicamata Sports Corporation.

== Personal life ==
Omar is the youngest of the footballers Rubén, Eduardo, a Chile international, and Osvaldo Gómez, who won the silver medal with Chile at the 1987 Pan American Games. Omar, Rubén and Eduardo played for Cobreloa. His father, Eduardo Sr., played football at amateur level for Magallanes from Sotaquí and Ferroviarios Ovalle.
