= Esteban Dunivicher =

Chilean footballer

Personal information
- Full name: Esteban Patricio Dunivicher Curutchet
- Date of birth: 1957 (age 68–69)
- Place of birth: Chile
- Position: Left winger

Youth career
- 1973: Universidad Católica

Senior career*
Years	Team	Apps	(Gls)
1974–1976	Rangers	27	(3)
1977–1978	Huachipato	13	(0)
1979–1980	Green Cross-Temuco	14	(3)
1981–1982	Lota Schwager		
1983	Iberia-Bío Bío		
1984	Trasandino		
1985	Deportes Ovalle		
1985–1987	RRC Etterbeek		
1987–1988	Rochefort FC		
- * Club domestic league appearances and goals

Esteban Patricio Dunivicher Curutchet (born 1957) is a Chilean former footballer who played as a left winger for clubs in Chile and Belgium.

== Career ==
A left winger, as a youth player, Dunivicher was with Universidad Católica in 1973. In 1974 he switched to Rangers de Talca and made his professional debut in the same year at the age of sixteen in the Chilean top division. He stayed with the club until 1976.

In the Chilean Primera División, he also played for Huachipato (1977–78), Green Cross Temuco (1979–80) and Trasandino (1984).

In the Chilean Segunda División, he played for Lota Schwager (1981–82), Iberia (1983) and Deportes Ovalle (1985).

After playing for Deportes Ovalle, he emigrated to Europe and played for both RRC Etterbeek and Rochefort FC in the Belgian Second Division.

== After football ==
Dunivicher made his home in Belgium and has worked as a football avisory and coach at youth level.

== Personal life ==
His father, José, was an Argentine football player and manager of Rangers de Talca.
