= Christian Jelves =

Chilean footballer (born 1991)

Personal information
- Full name: Christian André Jelves Palacios
- Date of birth: 22 January 1991 (age 35)
- Place of birth: Santiago, Chile
- Height: 1.74 m (5 ft 9 in)
- Position: Defensive midfielder

Youth career
- 2005–2007: Audax Italiano

Senior career*
Years	Team	Apps	(Gls)
2007–2015	Audax Italiano	80	(1)
2012–2013	Audax Italiano B	9	(3)
2013–2014	→ Coquimbo Unido (loan)	33	(0)
2015–2017	San Marcos	53	(1)
2017–2018	Curicó Unido	5	(0)
2017–2018	→ Murciélagos (loan)	8	(0)
2019–2021	Deportes Valdivia	46	(1)
2022	Deportes Concepción	5	(0)
2023–2024	Provincial Osorno	47	(4)
Total		286	(10)
- * Club domestic league appearances and goals

Christian André Jelves Palacios (born 22 January 1991) is a Chilean former footballer who played as a defensive midfielder.

== Club career ==
Born in the capital city of Chile, Santiago, Jelves started his career at the age of fourteen, after he was signed by Audax Italiano. He remained there as a youth player until 2007 when he trained with the first-team squad, under the direction of the coach Raul Toro.

After three years without play, in 2010, Jelves made his Audax Italiano debut, in a 2–1 win over Huachipato at the CAP Stadium. However, he only was featured in one game more in the entire season. For the next season, the coach Omar Labruna had more consideration in Jelves, and was able of make eight appearances of seventeen matches that disputed the team during the 2011 Apertura Tournament.

In August 2022, Jelves joined Deportes Concepción.

His last club was Provincial Osorno in 2023 and 2024. It was confirmed his retirement in November 2025.
