= 1981 Copa Libertadores finals =

1981 Copa Libertadores de América finals
- Flamengo, champions
- Event: 1981 Copa Libertadores de América
Flamengo	Cobreloa
(Brazil)	(Chile)
- 2–2 on points Flamengo won after a play-off

First leg
Flamengo	Cobreloa
2	1
- Date: 13 November 1981
- Venue: Maracanã Stadium, Rio de Janeiro
- Referee: Carlos Espósito (Argentina)
- Attendance: 93,985

Second leg
Cobreloa	Flamengo
1	0
- Date: 20 November 1981
- Venue: Estadio Nacional, Santiago
- Referee: Ramón Barreto (Uruguay)
- Attendance: 61,721

Play-off
Cobreloa	Flamengo
0	2
- Date: 23 November 1981
- Venue: Estadio Centenario, Montevideo
- Referee: Roque Cerullo (Uruguay)
- Attendance: 30,200

The 1981 Copa Libertadores de América finals was the final two-legged tie to determine the Copa Libertadores de América champion. It was contested by Brazilian club Flamengo and Chilean club Cobreloa. The first leg of the tie was played on 13 November at Flamengo's home field, with the second leg played on 20 November at Cobreloa's.

Flamengo won the series after winning a tie-breaking playoff 2–0 at Montevideo's Estadio Centenario. Thus, the Brazilian team achieved its first Copa Libertadores trophy.

== Qualified teams ==
Team	Previous finals app.
(Brazil) Flamengo	(none)
(Chile) Cobreloa	(none)

Bold indicates winning years

== Format ==
The finals were played over two legs; home and away. The team that accumulated the most points —two for a win, one for a draw, zero for a loss— after the two legs was to be crowned the champion. If the two teams were tied on points after the second leg, a playoff at a neutral venue was to become the next tie-breaker. Goal difference was going to be used as a last resort.

== Venues ==
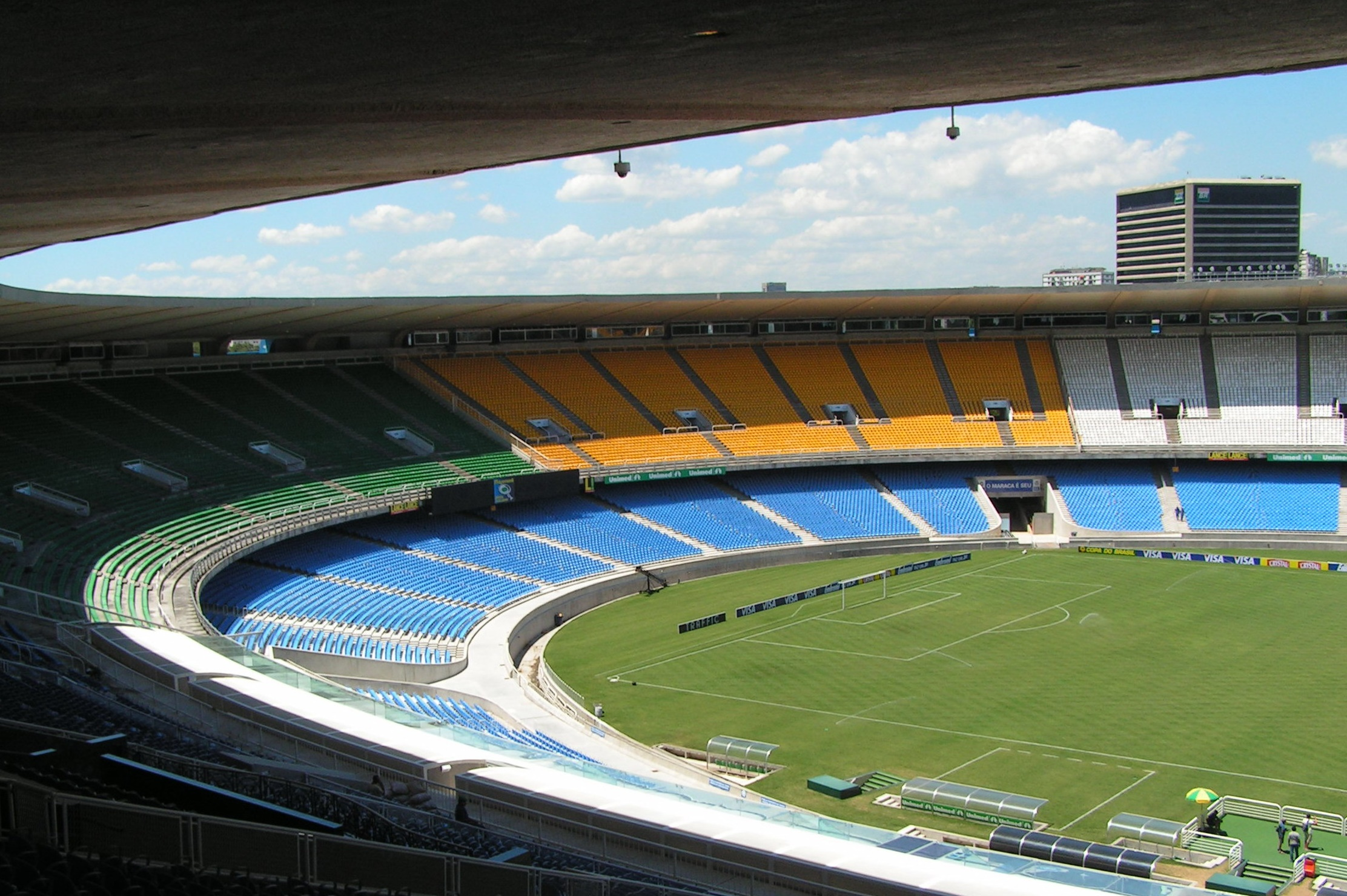
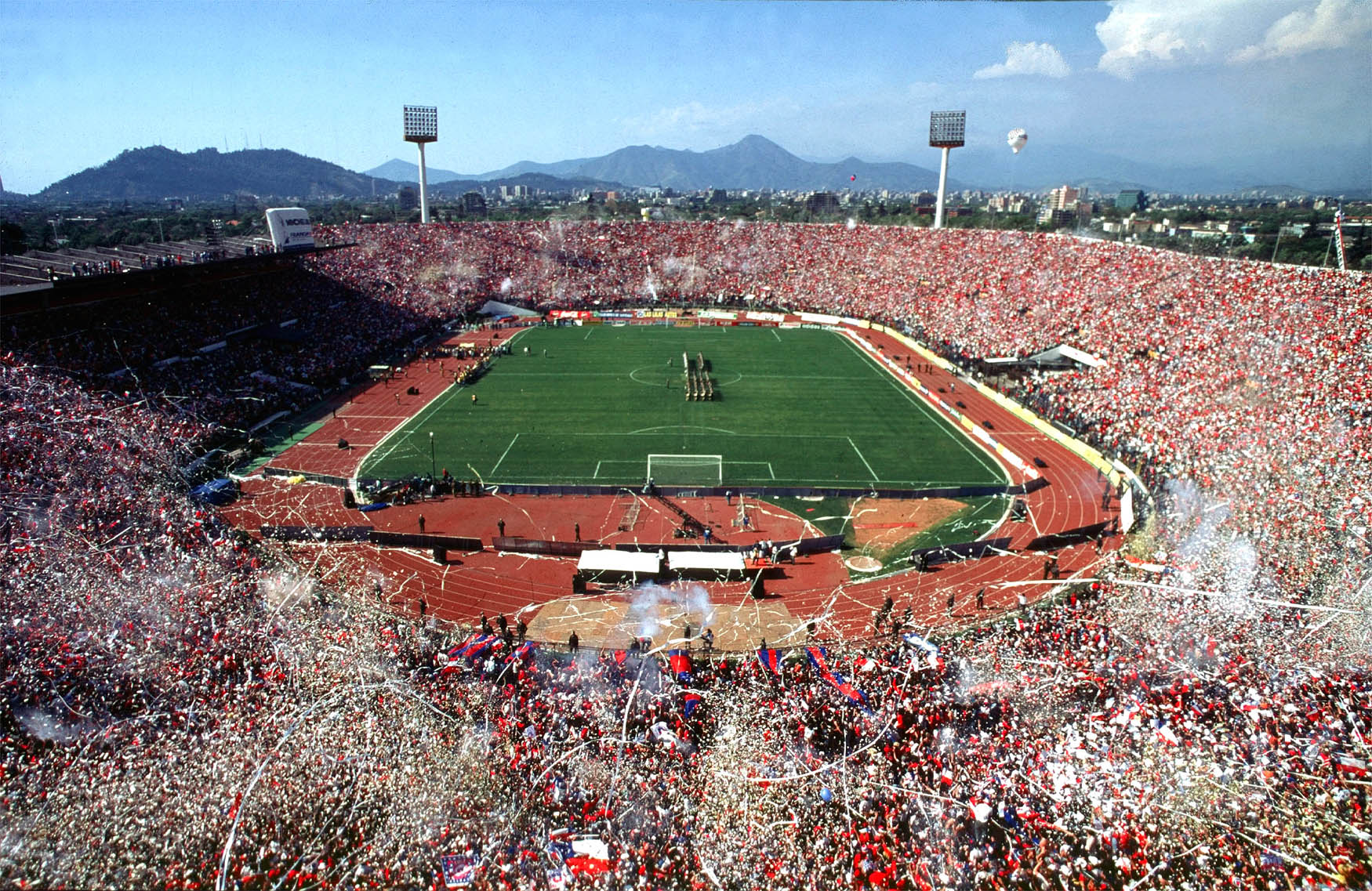
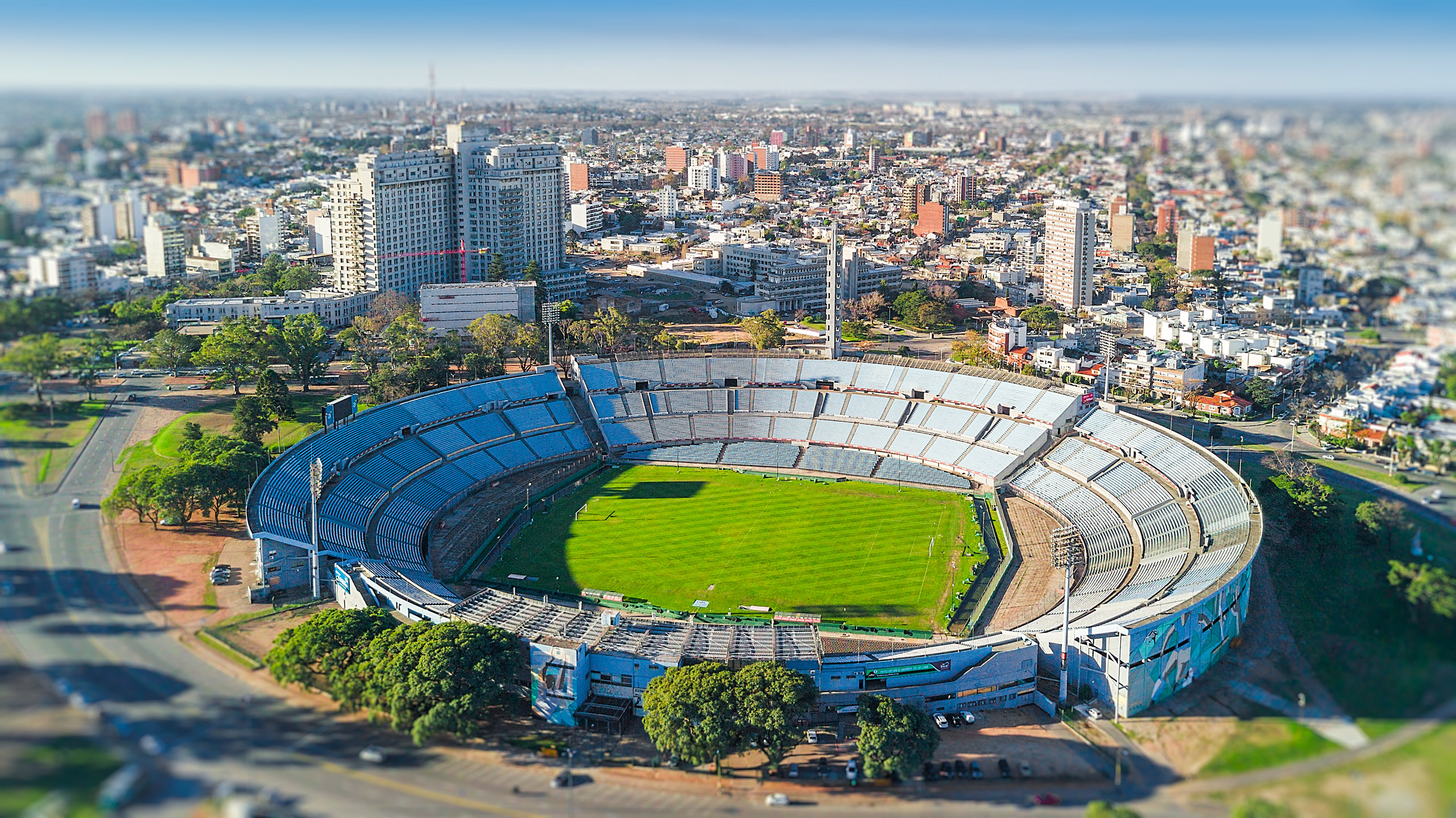
Fltr: Maracaná, Nacional de Santiago and Centenario, venues for the series

== Match details ==
=== First leg ===
1981 Copa Libertadores finals
13 November 1981
First leg

Flamengo (Brazil)	2–1	(Chile) Cobreloa
Zico 12', 30' (pen.)	Report	Merello 65'

Maracanã Stadium, Rio de Janeiro
Attendance: 93,985
Referee: Carlos Espósito (Argentina)

=== Second leg ===
20 November 1981
Second leg

Cobreloa (Chile)	1–0	(Brazil) Flamengo
Merello 79'	Report

Estadio Nacional, Santiago
Attendance: 61,721
Referee: Ramón Barreto (Uruguay)

=== Playoff ===
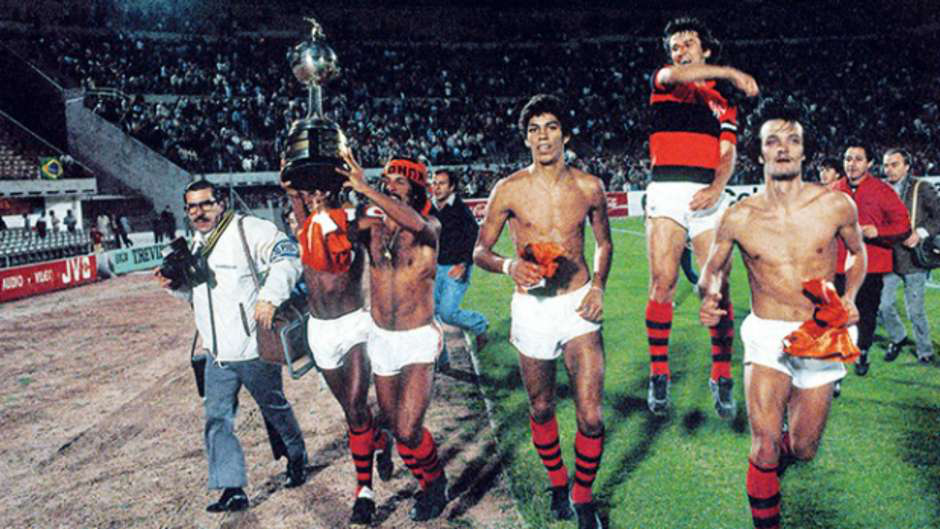
Some moments of the match, including the celebrations
23 November 1981
Playoff

Flamengo (Brazil)	2–0	(Chile) Cobreloa
Zico 18', 79'	Report

Estadio Centenario, Montevideo
Attendance: 30,200
Referee: Roque Cerullo (Uruguay)

**Flamengo**	**Cobreloa**

GK	20	(Brazil) Raul
RB	19	(Brazil) Nei Dias	(yellow card) 75'
CB	4	(Brazil) Marinho
CB	14	(Brazil) Mozer
LB	5	(Brazil) Júnior
DM	6	(Brazil) Andrade	(red card) 35'
MF	2	(Brazil) Leandro
AM	10	(Brazil) Zico (c)
FW	12	(Brazil) Tita
CF	9	(Brazil) Nunes		(substituted off) 86'
FW	8	(Brazil) Adílio
Substitutes:
FW	25	(Brazil) Anselmo	(red card) 89'	(substituted on) 86'
Manager:
(Brazil) Paulo César Carpegiani

GK	1	(Chile) Oscar Wirth
RB	2	(Chile) Hugo Tabilo
CB	3	(Chile) Juan Páez		(substituted off) 40'
CB	4	(Chile) Mario Soto (c)	(red card) 90'
LB	20	(Chile) Enzo Escobar	(yellow card) 31'
DM	6	(Chile) Eduardo Jiménez	(red card) 90'
CM	14	(Chile) Armando Alarcón	(yellow card) 5' (yellow-red card) 23'
CM	8	(Chile) Victor Merello
RW	11	(Chile) Héctor Puebla	(yellow card) 73'
CF	9	(Uruguay) Jorge Luis Siviero	(yellow card) 24'
LW	15	(Uruguay) Washington Olivera
Substitutes:
FW	7	(Chile) Oscar Múñoz		(substituted on) 40'
Manager:
(Argentina) Vicente Cantatore

Assistant referees:
Juan Cardelino (Uruguay)
Ramón Barreto (Uruguay)
Fourth official:
