= Julio Ortiz (footballer) =

Argentine footballer

Personal information
- Full name: Julio Alberto Ortiz Cornalia
- Date of birth: 3 June 1954 (age 72)
- Place of birth: San Marcos Sud, Córdoba, Argentina
- Height: 1.76 m (5 ft 9 in)
- Position: Forward

Youth career
- Instituto

Senior career*
Years	Team	Apps	(Gls)
1973–1976	Instituto	4+	(0+)
1977–1980	Deportes Ovalle	66	(22)
1979–1980	→ Charleroi (loan)	15	(4)
1980	→ Waregem (loan)	13	(5)
1980–1982	Ceuta	41	(12)
- * Club domestic league appearances and goals

Julio Alberto Ortiz Cornalia (born 3 June 1954) is an Argentine former professional footballer who plays as a forward.

== Career ==
Born in San Marcos Sud, Córdoba, Argentina, Ortiz started his career with Instituto from 1973, coinciding with famous players such as Mario Kempes and Osvaldo Ardiles, to 1976.

In 1977, Ortiz moved to Chile and joined Deportes Ovalle in their second season in the Chilean Primera División. Relegated to the Chilean Segunda División, he continued with them, becoming a remembered player. The next seasons, he moved to Europe to play on loan for Belgian clubs Charleroi and Waregem in the First Division.

In December 1980, Ortiz and the Uruguayan striker Alberto Dodat signed with Spanish side Ceuta in the Segunda División, becoming the two first foreign players in the club history. He retired after the 1981–82 season.

== Personal life ==
Ortiz was nicknamed El Chulito.
