= Luis Fuentes (footballer, born 1995) =

Chilean footballer

Personal information
- Full name: Luis Humberto Fuentes Jiménez
- Date of birth: 21 March 1995 (age 31)
- Place of birth: Rancagua, Chile
- Height: 1.74 m (5 ft 8 1/2 in)
- Position: Midfielder

Youth career
- O'Higgins

Senior career*
Years	Team	Apps	(Gls)
2014–2017	O'Higgins	1	(0)
2015	→ Colchagua (loan)	24	(0)
2017	→ General Velásquez (loan)	–	(–)
2018	Deportes Rengo	–	(–)
2018	Deportes Vallenar	19	(1)
2019	Lautaro de Buin	15	(0)
2020–2021	Cobreloa	13	(0)
2021–2022	Deportes Valdivia	4	(0)
2023	General Velásquez	0	(0)
- * Club domestic league appearances and goals ‡ National team caps and goals as of 12 January 2025

Luis Humberto Fuentes Jiménez (born 21 March 1995) is a Chilean footballer who plays as a midfielder.

== Career ==
In January 2023, Fuentes signed with General Velásquez.

== Personal life ==
He is a twin brother of the footballer Juan Fuentes.

== Honours ==
General Velásquez

- Tercera A: 2017
