= Xabier Santos =

Chilean footballer

Personal information
- Full name: Xabier Ignacio Santos Rodríguez
- Date of birth: 4 March 1997 (age 29)
- Place of birth: Ovalle, Chile
- Position: Winger

Team information
- Current team: Deportes Ovalle
- Number: 7

Youth career
- Academia Kico Rojas
- 2009–2010: Selección Salamanca
- 2010–2015: Universidad Católica
- 2015–2016: Udinese
- 2015–2016: → Granada (loan)

Senior career*
Years	Team	Apps	(Gls)
2015	Universidad Católica	0	(0)
2016–2018	Udinese	0	(0)
2016	→ Granada B (loan)	12	(2)
2017	→ Extremadura (loan)	2	(0)
2018	→ Ñublense (loan)	5	(0)
2019	Ñublense	2	(0)
2020–2021	Provincial Ovalle	8	(3)
2021–2023	Deportes Valdivia	51	(9)
2026–	Deportes Ovalle	8	(11)

International career
2016	Chile U20	1	(0)
- * Club domestic league appearances and goals as of 25 June 2026

Xabier Ignacio Santos Rodríguez (born 24 March 1997) is a Chilean footballer who plays as a winger for Deportes Ovalle.

== Club career ==
Born in Ovalle, Chile, Santos was trained at Academia Kico Rojas in his hometown and played for the team of Salamanca before joining the Universidad Católica youth ranks, aged 13. After standing out with the Universidad Católica under-20 team and having a brief stint with the first team in 2015, Santos signed a five-year contract with Italian club Udinese and was sent on loan to Spanish clubs Granada and Extremadura UD between 2015 and 2017.

In 2018, Santos returned to his homeland with Ñublense on loan from Udinese and continued with them for the 2019 season. In 2020, he switched to Provincial Ovalle.

From 2021 to 2023, Santos played for Deportes Valdivia. In 2026, he returned to football activity with his hometown's club, Deportes Ovalle.

== International career ==
In 2015, Santos served as a sparring for the Chile senior team under Jorge Sampaoli with views to the Copa América. The next year, he represented the under-20's in the friendly tournament Copa Ciudad de la Independencia.
