= Rubén Gómez (footballer, born 1956) =

Chilean footballer

Personal information
- Full name: Rubén Darío Gómez Cortez
- Date of birth: 16 April 1956 (age 70)
- Place of birth: Ovalle, Chile
- Position: Midfielder

Youth career
- Barros Luco Sur
- Mecánicos
- 1974: Deportes Ovalle

Senior career*
Years	Team	Apps	(Gls)
1974–1977	Deportes Ovalle	62+	(15+)
1978–1984	Cobreloa	184	(42)
1985	Naval	24	(2)
1986	Rangers	20	(4)
1987–1988	Deportes Ovalle		
1989	Coquimbo Unido		
1990	Deportes Ovalle		

International career
1975	Chile U20		
1979	Chile		

Managerial career
- 2002: Deportes Ovalle
- * Club domestic league appearances and goals

Rubén Darío Gómez Cortez (born 16 April 1956) is a Chilean former professional footballer who played as a midfielder.

== Playing career ==
Born in Ovalle, Chile, Gómez played for local clubs Barros Luco Sur and Mecánicos before joining Deportes Ovalle, aged 18. With them, he got promotion to Primera División, represented them in the only two seasons at top level in 1976 and 1977.

In 1978, he switched to Cobreloa in their first season in the Chilean top division. A historical player, he represented them until 1984, winning the Primera División in 1980 and 1982. They also were the Copa Libertadores runners-up in 1981 and 1982.

The next years, Gómez played for Naval de Talcahuano (1985) and Rangers de Talca (1986) in the Chilean top division before ending his career with Deportes Ovalle from 1987 to 1990, with a brief stint with Coquimbo Unido in 1989.

At international level, Gómez represented Chile at under-20 level in the 1975 South American Championship. At senior level, he was called up to a squad under Luis Santibáñez in 1979 and took part in some friendlies, scoring a goal in the 2–2 draw against Racing Club de Avellaneda on 3 October 1979.

== Coaching career ==
Gómez led Deportes Ovalle in the 2002 Primera B alongside his brother, Eduardo.

== Personal life ==
Rubén is the eldest of the footballers, Eduardo, a Chile international, Osvaldo, who won the silver medal with Chile at the 1987 Pan American Games, and Omar Gómez. Rubén, Eduardo and Omar played for Cobreloa. His father, Eduardo Sr., played football at amateur level for Magallanes from Sotaquí and Ferroviarios Ovalle.

He is nicknamed Nene Gómez.
