= Nicolás Aguirre (footballer, born 1991) =

Argentine footballer

Personal information
- Full name: Nicolás Agustín Aguirre
- Date of birth: 12 April 1991 (age 35)
- Place of birth: Salta, Argentina
- Height: 1.88 m (6 ft 2 in)
- Position: Centre-back

Team information
- Current team: San Marcos
- Number: 6

Senior career*
Years	Team	Apps	(Gls)
2009–2010	Racing Club	0	(0)
2010–2012	Huracán	0	(0)
2012–2013	Monterrico San Vicente	21	(5)
2013	Juventud Antoniana	16	(0)
2014–2015	Gimnasia y Tiro	21	(0)
2016	Central Norte	12	(0)
2016	Delfín	10	(1)
2017	Argentino Peñarol	15	(2)
2019	Manta	21	(3)
2020	Real Potosí	16	(0)
2021	Sarmiento Resistencia	0	(0)
2021–2022	Juventud Antoniana	–	(–)
2022	Mineros de Guayana	13	(0)
2022–2023	Talleres de Perico	10	(3)
2023	Zamora	2	(0)
2024–2025	Deportivo Iztapa	–	(–)
2025	San Benito	–	(–)
2026–	San Marcos	0	(0)
- * Club domestic league appearances and goals as of 3 February 2026

Nicolás Agustín Aguirre (born 12 April 1991) is an Argentine footballer who plays as a centre-back for Chilean club San Marcos de Arica.

== Club career ==
Born in Salta, Argentina, Aguirre had stints with Racing Club and Huracán before making his senior debut with Monterrico San Vicente in 2013. The next years, he played for Juventud Antoniana, Gimnasia y Tiro and Central Norte.

In June 2016, Aguirre moved abroad and signed with Ecuadorian club Delfín. After playing for Argentino Peñarol in his homeland, he returned to Ecuador to play for Manta in 2019.

In January 2020, Aguirre moved to Bolivia and joined Real Potosí.

After winning the 2021–22 Torneo Regional Federal Amateur with Juventud Antoniana, Aguirre moved to Venezuela and joined Mineros de Guayana in March 2022. After a stint with Talleres de Perico in his homeland, he returned to Venezuela to play for Zamora in 2023.

In 2024 and 2025, Aguirre played in Guatemala for Deportivo Iztapa and San Benito in the second level.

In December 2025, Aguirre moved to Chile and joined San Marcos de Arica.
