= Rodrigo Linares =

Argentine-Chilean footballer

Personal information
- Full name: Rodrigo Nicolás Linares Coronel
- Date of birth: 15 May 1995 (age 31)
- Place of birth: Rawson, Chubut, Argentina
- Height: 1.75 m (5 ft 9 in)
- Position: Forward

Youth career
- 2008–2011: C.A.I.
- 2014–2015: → Argentinos Juniors (loan)

Senior career*
Years	Team	Apps	(Gls)
2012–2015	C.A.I.	20	(4)
2012	→ Fútbol y Tenis (loan)	–	(–)
2013	→ Villa Congreso (loan)	–	(–)
2014–2015	→ Argentinos Juniors (loan)	0	(0)
2016	Gutiérrez	12	(3)
2016	Villa Congreso	–	(–)
2017–2018	Germinal Rawson	13	(5)
2019	J.J. Moreno	21	(11)
2019	Caupolicán Cauquenes	–	(–)
2020	Huracán de Comodoro	6	(3)
2020–2021	Deportes Puerto Montt	20	(2)
2021	→ Deportes Valdivia (loan)	9	(7)
2022	Germinal Rawson	0	(0)
2022	Deportes Valdivia	5	(0)
2022–2023	J.J. Moreno	–	(–)
2023–2025	Independiente Trelew	–	(–)
2025	Cosal	–	(–)

International career
2014	Chile U20	3	(1)
- * Club domestic league appearances and goals

Rodrigo Nicolás Linares Coronel (born 15 May 1995) is an Argentine-Chilean professional footballer who plays as a forward for J.J. Moreno.

== Club career ==
Born in Rawson, Argentina, Linares came to Comisión de Actividades Infantiles (CAI) youth system at the age of thirteen. After a trial in front of Hugo Tocalli, he was with Argentinos Juniors, making appearances for the reserve team.

In his homeland, he also has played for Fútbol y Tenis from Río Negro, Gutiérrez, Villa Congreso from Viedma, Germinal Rawson, J.J. Moreno from Puerto Madryn and Huracán de Comodoro.

Abroad, he played for Chilean side Caupolicán from Cauquenes in 2019. In 2020, he returned to Chile and joined Deportes Puerto Montt alongside his compatriot Jeremías Asencio. The next season, he joined on loan to Deportes Valdivia. After signing with Germinal Rawson for the 2022 season, he rejoined Deportes Valdivia in the same season.

In the second half of 2022, Linares signed with J.J. Moreno. In March 2023, he switched to Independiente de Trelew.

In March 2025, Linares moved to Punta Arenas, Chile, to play for Club Deportivo Cosal.

== International career ==
Linares represented Chile at under-20 level in an international friendly championship in 2014, where he made three appearances and scored a goal against Uruguay, and was in the preliminar list for the 2015 South American Championship alongside the also Argentine-born, Luciano Cabral.

== Personal life ==
Linares acquired the Chilean nationality by descent since his grandmother is a Chilean who came to Argentina at the age of twelve.
