= Osvaldo Gómez =

Chilean footballer

Personal information
- Full name: Osvaldo René Gómez Cortez
- Date of birth: 10 April 1964 (age 62)
- Place of birth: Ovalle, Chile
- Position: Midfielder

Youth career
- 1981–1982: Deportes Ovalle

Senior career*
Years	Team	Apps	(Gls)
1982–1985	Deportes Ovalle		
1986–1988	Colo-Colo	10	(0)
1988	→ Naval (loan)	8	(2)
1989	Palestino		
1990–1996	Deportes Ovalle		

International career
1987	Chile Pan American		
- * Club domestic league appearances and goals

Osvaldo René Gómez Cortez (born 10 April 1964) is a Chilean former professional footballer who played as a midfielder.

== Playing career ==
Born in Ovalle, Chile, Gómez joined the Deportes Ovalle youth ranks in 1981 under Sergio Recabarren and made his senior debut the next year in a match against Fernández Vial, aged 17.

After standing out with Deportes Ovalle in 1985, Gómez signed with Chilean giant Colo-Colo in January 1986. With them, he won the 1986 Primera División. In 1988, he was loaned out to Naval de Talcahuano.

In 1989, Gómez played for Palestino, getting promotion to the Primera División for the next season.

Following Palestino, Gómez returned to Deportes Ovalle in 1990. After they were relegated to the Tercera División in 1991, they won the league title in 1993, returning to the Chilean second level. He retired in 1996, coinciding with his brothers Eduardo and Omar.

At international level, Gómez represented Chile at the 1987 Pan American Games, winning the silver medal.

== Coaching career ==
Osvaldo and his brother Eduardo owns a football academy in his hometown, Ovalle.

== Personal life ==
Osvaldo is the brother of the footballers, Rubén, the eldest, Eduardo, a Chile international, and Omar Gómez. He is the only one that didn't play for Chilean giant Cobreloa. His father, Eduardo Sr., played football at amateur level for Magallanes from Sotaquí and Ferroviarios Ovalle.
