= Ciro Ocampo =

Argentine footballer

Personal information
- Full name: Ciro Antonio Ocampo
- Date of birth: 21 July 1947 (age 79)
- Place of birth: Entre Ríos, Argentina
- Position: Midfielder

Senior career*
Years	Team	Apps	(Gls)
1966–1969	Deportivo Italiano	80	(28)
1969	Unión Santa Fe	9	(2)
1970	Deportivo Morón	9	(2)
1974	Deportivo Quito	12	(2)
1975–1976	Almagro	1	(0)
1976	Deportivo Quito		
1976	Almirante Brown		
1977–1980	Deportes Ovalle	19+	(3+)
1980–1984	San Antonio Unido		
- * Club domestic league appearances and goals

Ciro Antonio Ocampo (born 21 July 1947) is an Argentine former professional footballer who played as a midfielder.

== Career ==
Born in Entre Ríos, Argentina, Ocampo played for Deportivo Italiano, Unión de Santa Fe, Deportivo Morón, Almagro and Almirante Brown in his homeland. As player of Unión de Santa Fe, he scored the winning goal in the 4–3 against Newell's Old Boys on 5 July 1969, getting promotion to the 1969 Campeonato Nacional.

In Ecuador, Ocampo had stints with Deportivo Quito in both the Serie A and the Serie B in 1974 and 1976, respectively.

In 1977, Ocampo moved to Chile and joined Deportes Ovalle in their second season in the Chilean Primera División. Relegated to the Chilean Segunda División, he continued with them until 1980, becoming a remembered player. He ended his career with San Antonio Unido.
