= Hernán Ibarra =

Chilean footballer

Personal information
- Full name: Hernán Alfonso Ibarra Rojas
- Date of birth: 9 August 1954 (age 72)
- Place of birth: Santiago, Chile
- Position: Centre-back

Senior career*
Years	Team	Apps	(Gls)
1975	Colo-Colo	1	(0)
- Colchagua
- Curicó Unido
1981–1983	Deportes Arica	44+	(0)

Managerial career
- 1993: Coronel Bolognesi
- 1994: Deportes Arica
- 1996: Deportes Arica
- 1997–2001: Deportes Ovalle
- 2002: Unión La Calera
- 2003: Everton
- 2003: Deportes Arica
- 2004: Deportes Ovalle
- 2005: Deportes Antofagasta
- 2006–2007: Unión La Calera
- 2008–2010: Deportes Antofagasta
- 2011: San Marcos de Arica
- 2011–2012: Deportes Copiapó
- 2012: Santiago Morning
- 2013: Santiago Morning
- 2022–2025: Proyección Ovalle
- 2025–: Universidad Católica (youth)
- * Club domestic league appearances and goals

Hernán Alfonso Ibarra Rojas (born 9 August 1954) is a Chilean football manager and former player who played as a centre-back.

== Club career ==
Ibarra played for Colo-Colo, Colchagua, Curicó Unido and Deportes Arica.

Ibarra helped Deportes Arica to win the 1981 Segunda División and continued with them in the Primera División.

== Coaching career ==
Ibarra started his career with Peruvian club Coronel Bolognesi in 1993. Back to his homeland, he led several clubs such as Deportes Arica, Deportes Ovalle, Everton de Viña del Mar, Unión La Calera, Deportes Antofagasta, San Marcos de Arica, Deportes Copiapó, and Santiago Morning.

In 2022, Ibarra assumed as coach for the football academy Proyección Ovalle under Club Social y Deportivo Ovalle. Later, he assumed as coach for the Universidad Católica football academy based in Arica.
