= Hugo Tabilo =

Chilean footballer

Personal information
- Full name: Hugo del Carmen Tabilo Avilés
- Date of birth: 15 September 1956 (age 70)
- Place of birth: Ovalle, Chile
- Position: Defender

Youth career
- Deportes Ovalle

Senior career*
Years	Team	Apps	(Gls)
1976–1978	Deportes Ovalle	101	(0)
1979–1990	Cobreloa	364	(13)
1991–1992	Deportes Antofagasta	54	(0)

International career
1984–1985	Chile	3	(0)

Managerial career
- 1997–1998: Cobreloa (assistant)
- 1998–2001: Cobreloa (youth)
- 2001–2002: Cobreloa (assistant)
- Deportivo Radomiro Tomic
- * Club domestic league appearances and goals

Hugo del Carmen Tabilo Avilés (born 15 September 1956) is a Chilean former professional footballer who played as a defender.

== Playing career ==
Born in Ovalle, Chile, Tabilo started his career with local club Deportes Ovalle and made his senior debut in 1976, taking part in the only two seasons at Primera División for the club in that year and 1977.

Having standing out with Deportes Ovalle in 1978, Tabilo signed with Cobreloa in 1979. A historical player, he represented them until 1990, winning the Primera División four times in 1980, 1982, 1985, and 1988, in addition to the 1986 Copa Polla Lan Chile. They also were the Copa Libertadores runners-up in 1981 and 1982.

Tabilo ended his career with Deportes Antofagasta in 1991 and 1992.

== International career ==
Tabilo represented the Chile national team three times from 1984 to 1985.

== Coaching career ==
Tabilo served as assistant coach of Carlos Rojas for Cobreloa in 1997–98. He has also coached the Deportivo Radomiro Tomic, the football club from his workplace, the Radomiro Tomic mine.

== Personal life ==
Settled in Calama, Tabilo lost his house in a fire in August 2018.

On 25 January 2024, Tabilo and his wife suffered a serious car accident on the way to Calama from Tocopilla.
