= Facundo Krüger =

Argentine footballer

Personal information
- Full name: Facundo Nicolás Krüger
- Date of birth: 5 June 2000 (age 26)
- Place of birth: Ezeiza, Buenos Aires, Argentina
- Height: 1.84 m (6 ft 0 in)
- Position: Striker

Team information
- Current team: Temperley

Youth career
- 2012–2015: Arsenal de Sarandí
- 2015–2016: Deportivo Camioneros
- 2016–2017: Tristán Suárez
- 2018: Cañuelas

Senior career*
Years	Team	Apps	(Gls)
2018–2024	Cañuelas	66	(14)
2021	→ Deportes Valdivia (loan)	10	(0)
2023	→ Temperley (loan)	27	(5)
2024–	Temperley	27	(1)
2024–2025	→ Barracas Central (loan)	1	(0)
- * Club domestic league appearances and goals as of 17:55, 20 April 2026 (UTC)

Facundo Nicolás Krüger (born 5 June 2000) is an Argentine footballer who plays as a striker for Temperley.

== Club career ==
Born in Ezeiza, Buenos Aires, Argentina, Krüger was with Arsenal de Sarandí, Deportivo Camioneros and Tristán Suárez before joining Cañuelas in February 2018. In November of the same year, he made his debut with the first team against Deportivo Armenio under Roberto Sosa.

He scored the goal with which Cañuelas won the 2019 Apertura of the Primera C. He also was a member of the squad that got promotion to the Primera B Metropolitana in the 2020 Transición of the Primera C.

In March 2021, he was loaned out to Chilean club Deportes Valdivia.

In the 2023 season, he was loaned out to Temperley with an option to buy. After his loan ended, he was permanently transferred to Temperley on a deal for three years.

On 29 June 2024, he joined Barracas Central on loan.

== Personal life ==
As a youth player of Tristán Suárez in 2016, he suffered a serious car accident and a trimalleolar fracture. He returned to play in 2018.

His father, Héctor Peteco Krüger, played for Cañuelas at the end of the 1990s.
