= Axel Arce =

Argentine footballer

Personal information
- Full name: Axel Gabriel Arce
- Date of birth: 12 October 1998 (age 28)
- Place of birth: Villa Zagala, Buenos Aires, Argentina
- Height: 1.70 m (5 ft 7 in)
- Position: Forward

Team information
- Current team: Atlético Lugano
- Number: 7

Youth career
- Colegiales

Senior career*
Years	Team	Apps	(Gls)
2016–2018	Colegiales	43	(3)
2019–2021	Rangers	0	(0)
2019–2020	→ Los Andes (loan)	13	(1)
2021	→ Deportes Valdivia (loan)	5	(0)
2022–2023	Acassuso	48	(6)
2024	AFFI Academia	–	(–)
2025–	Atlético Lugano	14	(1)
- * Club domestic league appearances and goals as of 1 October 2025

Axel Gabriel Arce (born 12 October 1998) is an Argentine footballer who plays as a forward for Atlético Lugano.

== Club career ==
Born in Villa Zagala, Buenos Aires, Argentina, Arce was trained at Colegiales and played for them until the 2018 season.

In 2019, Arce moved to Chile and joined Rangers de Talca. After making one appearance in the 2021 Copa Chile match against Independiente de Cauquenes on 24 March, he was loaned out to Los Andes (2019–2020) in his homeland and Deportes Valdivia in the 2021 Segunda División Profesional.

Back to Argentina in 2022, Arce signed with Acassuso.

In July 2024, Arce joined AFFI Academia. The next year, he switched to Atlético Lugano.
