= Luis Marcoleta =

Chilean former footballer and manager (born 1959)

Personal information
- Full name: Luis Antonio Marcoleta Yáñez
- Date of birth: 2 February 1959 (age 67)
- Place of birth: Antofagasta, Chile
- Height: 1.89 m (6 ft 2 1/2 in)
- Position: Forward

Team information
- Current team: Deportes Antofagasta (head coach)

Senior career*
Years	Team	Apps	(Gls)
1978–1981	Deportes Antofagasta	65	(22)
1981–1982	Magallanes	47	(15)
1983	América de Cali	28	(16)
1984	Audax Italiano	21	(8)
1985	Deportes Iquique	24	(9)
1986	Deportes Antofagasta	16	(3)
1987	San Luis	14	(2)
1987	Unión La Calera	13	(1)
1988–1989	Deportes Valdivia	53	(37)
1989	Palestino	9	(0)
1990	Lozapenco	-	(-)
1991	Huachipato	8	(0)

Managerial career
- 1998: Deportes Valdivia
- 1999: Naval
- 2000: Universidad de Concepción
- 2002: Deportes Antofagasta
- 2003: Unión La Calera
- 2004: Deportes Concepción
- 2004–2007: Ñublense
- 2008–2010: Curicó Unido
- 2010–2011: Ñublense
- 2012–2013: San Marcos
- 2014: Everton
- 2015–2018: Curicó Unido
- 2018–2019: Deportes La Serena
- 2020–2021: Rangers
- 2021–2023: Deportes Valdivia
- 2023-2025: Santiago Morning
- 2025–: Deportes Antofagasta
- * Club domestic league appearances and goals

Luis Antonio Marcoleta Yáñez (born 2 February 1959) is a Chilean former footballer and manager. He is the current manager of Chilean club Deportes Antofagasta.

== Honours ==
=== Club ===
==== Player ====
América de Cali

- Primera División de Colombia: 1984

=== Manager ===
Naval

- Tercera División de Chile (1): 1999

Ñublense

- Tercera División de Chile (1): 2004

Curicó Unido

- Primera B de Chile (1): 2008

San Marcos de Arica

- Primera B de Chile (2): 2012, 2013–14

== See also ==
- List of football managers with the most matches
