= Pablo Tamburrini =

Chilean-Palestinian footballer (born 1990)

Personal information
- Full name: Pablo Andrés Tamburrini Bravo
- Date of birth: 30 January 1990 (age 36)
- Place of birth: Santiago, Chile
- Height: 1.72 m (5 ft 8 in)
- Position: Midfielder

Youth career
- Palestino

Senior career*
| Years | Team | Apps | (Gls) |
| 2010–2015 | Palestino | 73 | (1) |
| 2010 | → San Antonio Unido (loan) | – | (–) |
| 2011 | → Municipal La Pintana (loan) | – | (–) |
| 2014–2015 | → Santiago Wanderers (loan) | 27 | (2) |
| 2015 | → San Luis (loan) | 1 | (0) |
| 2016–2017 | Al-Bireh | – | (–) |
| 2017 | San Antonio Unido | 17 | (0) |
| 2017–2018 | Al-Bireh | – | (–) |
| 2019 | Lautaro de Buin | 9 | (0) |
| 2021 | Deportes Valdivia | 9 | (0) |

International career^{‡}
| 2015–2019 | Palestine | 21 | (1) |
- * Club domestic league appearances and goals as of 3 July 2023 ‡ National team caps and goals as of 6 January 2019

Pablo Andrés Tamburrini Bravo (born 30 January 1990) is a professional footballer who plays as a midfielder. Born in Chile, Tamburrini is of Palestinian descent and represented Palestine internationally. He last played for Deportes Valdivia of the Segunda División Profesional de Chile.

== International career ==
Tamburrini was born and raised in Chile to Chilean parents with Palestinian ancestry. He was called up to the Palestine national football team internationally, making his debut in the 2018 World Cup qualification match against Saudi Arabia in June 2015, and scored his first international goal in a 3–2 defeat.

=== International goals ===
Score and Result columns list Palestine's goals first.

| # | Date | Venue | Opponent | Score | Result | Competition |
|---|---|---|---|---|---|---|
| 1 | 11 June 2015 | Prince Mohamed bin Fahd Stadium, Dammam, Saudi Arabia | Saudi Arabia | 1–2 | 2–3 | 2018 FIFA World Cup qualification |
Correct as of 8 September 2015
