= 2015–16 Segunda División Profesional de Chile =

Segunda División Profesional de Chile
- Season: 2015–16

The 2015–16 Segunda División Profesional de Chile was the 5th season of Chile's third-flight football. The competition began on August 15, 2015 and ends on June 4, 2016.

== Participating teams ==
Team	Stadium	Capacity
Colchagua	Municipal Jorge Silva Valenzuela	5,900
Deportes La Pintana	Municipal de La Pintana	6,000
Deportes Linares	Fiscal de Linares	7,000
Deportes Melipilla	Municipal Roberto Bravo Santibáñez	6,000
Deportes Ovalle	Municipal de Ovalle	8,000
Deportes Santa Cruz	Municipal Joaquín Muñoz García	5,000
Deportes Valdivia	Félix Gallardo	3,000
Lota Schwager	Federico Schwager	5,700
Malleco Unido	Municipal Alberto Larraguibel Morales	2,345
Municipal Mejillones	Municipal de Mejillones	1,500
Naval	El Morro	3,000
San Antonio Unido	Municipal Doctor Olegario Henríquez Escalante	2,000
Trasandino	Regional de Los Andes	3,313

== First stage ==
=== League table ===
Pos	Team	Pld	W	D	L	GF	GA	GD	Pts	Qualification
1	Deportes La Pintana (A)	24	14	4	6	54	32	+22	46	Qualification to the Play-offs Championship
2	San Antonio Unido (A)	24	14	4	6	39	26	+13	46	Qualification to the Play-offs Championship
3	Naval (A)	24	13	4	7	43	25	+18	43	Qualification to the Play-offs Championship
4	Deportes Santa Cruz (A)	24	12	5	7	39	25	+14	41	Qualification to the Play-offs Championship
5	Trasandino (A)	24	12	4	8	45	35	+10	40	Qualification to the Play-offs Championship
6	Deportes Valdivia (A)	24	11	5	8	48	38	+10	38	Qualification to the Play-offs Championship
7	Deportes Melipilla	24	9	7	8	24	20	+4	34	Qualification to the Play-offs Relegation
8	Deportes Ovalle	24	9	4	11	24	40	−16	31	Qualification to the Play-offs Relegation
9	Malleco Unido	24	8	6	10	30	35	−5	30	Qualification to the Play-offs Relegation
10	Municipal Mejillones	24	8	4	12	32	52	−20	28	Qualification to the Play-offs Relegation
11	Lota Schwager	24	4	11	9	24	30	−6	23	Qualification to the Play-offs Relegation
12	Colchagua	24	3	8	13	24	41	−17	17	Qualification to the Play-offs Relegation
13	Deportes Linares	24	4	4	16	23	50	−27	16	Qualification to the Play-offs Relegation

Updated to match(es) played on 28 February 2016. Source: First Phase
Rules for classification: 1) points; 2) goal difference; 3) number of goals scored.
(A) Advance to a further round

== Second stage ==
=== Playoff Championship ===
Pos	Team	Pld	W	D	L	GF	GA	GD	Pts	Promotion
1	Deportes Valdivia	34	19	6	9	69	47	+22	63	Promotion to Primera B 2016-17
2	San Antonio Unido	34	16	11	7	50	34	+16	59	
3	Deportes La Pintana	34	17	7	10	65	49	+16	58	
4	Deportes Santa Cruz	34	16	9	9	52	32	+20	57	
5	Naval	34	15	5	14	56	46	+10	50	
6	Trasandino	34	13	8	13	55	52	+3	47	

Updated to match(es) played on 09 May 2016. Source: anfp.cl
Rules for classification: 1) points; 2) goal difference; 3) number of goals scored.

=== Playoff Relegation ===
Pos	Team	Pld	W	D	L	GF	GA	GD	Pts	Relegation
7	Malleco Unido	29	11	7	11	40	43	−3	40	
8	Deportes Ovalle	28	11	5	12	30	45	−15	38	
9	Deportes Melipilla	28	10	7	11	28	26	+2	37	
10	Municipal Mejillones	27	9	5	13	37	58	−21	32	
11	Colchagua	28	6	9	13	32	42	−10	27	Relegation to Tercera División 2016
12	Lota Schwager	28	4	13	11	25	34	−9	25	Relegation to Tercera División 2016
13	Deportes Linares	28	4	6	18	27	57	−30	18	Relegation to Tercera División 2016

Updated to match(es) played on 12 March 2016. Source: anfp.cl
Rules for classification: 1) points; 2) goal difference; 3) number of goals scored.

== See also ==
- 2015–16 Chilean Primera División season
- 2015–16 Primera B de Chile
