= Agustín Maidana =

Argentine footballer

Personal information
- Full name: Agustín Alejandro Maidana Salinas
- Date of birth: 20 October 2001 (age 25)
- Place of birth: Lomas de Zamora, Argentina
- Height: 1.72 m (5 ft 8 in)
- Position: Attacking midfielder

Team information
- Current team: San Marcos
- Number: 19

Youth career
- Argentino de Lomas (five-a-side)
- Vélez Sarsfield
- 2011–2017: Lanús
- 2017–2019: Los Andes

Senior career*
Years	Team	Apps	(Gls)
2019–2021	Los Andes	6	(0)
2021–2022	San Lorenzo	0	(0)
2022–2024	Defensa y Justicia	0	(0)
2023	→ Almagro (loan)	10	(0)
2024	→ Almirante Brown (loan)	7	(0)
2024	Almirante Brown	0	(0)
2025	San Telmo	15	(0)
2025	Plaza Colonia	6	(0)
2026–	San Marcos	1	(0)
- * Club domestic league appearances and goals as of 3 March 2026

Agustín Alejandro Maidana Salinas (born 20 October 2001) is an Argentine footballer who plays as an attacking midfielder for Chilean club San Marcos de Arica.

== Club career ==
Born in Lomas de Zamora, Argentina, Maidana was with local club Argentino de Lomas, Vélez Sarsfield and Lanús before joining Los Andes at the age of 16. He made his senior debut in the 0–1 away win against Villa San Carlos on 20 January 2020 for the 2019–20 Primera B Metropolitana and signed his first professional contract on 9 March of the same year.

In October 2021, Maidana signed with San Lorenzo de Almagro and switched to Defensa y Justicia in July 2022. He was loaned out to Almagro and Almirante Brown in 2023 and 2024, respectively.

In 2025, Maidana signed with San Telmo. In August of the same year, he moved abroad and joined Plaza Colonia in the Uruguayan Primera División.

In January 2026, Maidana moved to Chile and joined San Marcos de Arica.
