= 1972 Campeonato Nacional Segunda División =

Segunda División
- Season: 1972
- Champions: Palestino
- Promoted: Palestino
- Relegated: None

The 1972 Segunda División de Chile was the 21st season of the Segunda División de Chile.

Palestino was the tournament's champion.

== Table ==
Pos	Team	Pld	W	D	L	GF	GA	GD	Pts	Promotion
1	Palestino (C)	39	20	11	8	61	45	+16	51	Champions. Promoted.
2	Ferroviarios	39	18	12	9	78	53	+25	48	
3	Ñublense	39	16	14	9	49	40	+9	46	
4	Santiago Morning	39	13	16	10	65	55	+10	42	
5	Deportes Ovalle	39	16	9	14	52	45	+7	41	
6	San Antonio Unido	39	12	15	12	57	51	+6	39	
7	Audax Italiano	39	8	22	9	50	45	+5	38	
8	Aviación	39	12	14	13	57	58	−1	38	
9	Deportes Colchagua	39	12	13	14	53	58	−5	37	
10	Lister Rossel	39	11	13	15	62	66	−4	35	
11	Coquimbo Unido	39	9	17	13	45	57	−12	35	
12	Independiente de Cauquenes	39	9	15	15	44	57	−13	33	
13	San Luis de Quillota	39	12	9	18	50	71	−21	33	
14	Iberia	39	8	14	17	37	59	−22	30	

Source: rsssf.com
(C) Champions

== See also ==
- Chilean football league system
