= Hugo Brizuela =

Paraguayan footballer (born 1969)

Personal information
- Full name: Hugo Rolando Brizuela Benítez
- Date of birth: 8 February 1969 (age 57)
- Place of birth: Pilar, Paraguay
- Height: 1.75 m (5 ft 9 in)
- Position: Striker

Youth career
- Sol de América

Senior career*
Years	Team	Apps	(Gls)
1989–1992	Sol de América	15	(6)
1992–1995	O'Higgins	61	(23)
1993	→ Unión Española (loan)	15	(3)
1996–1997	Audax Italiano	50	(29)
1998	Argentinos Juniors	32	(20)
1999–2000	Universidad Católica	53	(29)
2001	Chacarita Juniors	17	(10)
2001–2002	Pachuca	26	(8)
2002–2003	León	14	(2)
2003	Barcelona SC	1	(0)
2004	Audax Italiano	12	(1)
2005	O'Higgins	18	(7)
Total		314	(138)

International career
1998–2002	Paraguay	21	(3)
- * Club domestic league appearances and goals

Hugo Rolando Brizuela Benítez (born 8 February 1969) is a Paraguayan former professional footballer who played as a striker.

== Career ==
Brizuela started his career with Sol de América in his homeland, with whom he won the 1991 Paraguayan Primera División and took part in the Copa Libertadores in 1989 and 1992.

He spent the most part of his career in Chile playing for O'Higgins, Unión Española, Audax Italiano and Universidad Católica.

In Argentina, he played for Argentinos Juniors and Chacarita Juniors in 1998 and 2001, respectively.

In Mexico, he played for Pachuca and León. He was part of the Pachuca team that won the Invierno 2001 championship in Mexico.

In Ecuador, he made an appearance for Barcelona SC.

He ended his career with Audax Italiano in 2004 and O'Higgins in the 2005 Primera B.

At international level, Brizuela represented Paraguay at the 1998 FIFA World Cup. He earned a total of 15 caps with three goals scored between 1998 and 2002.

== Personal life ==
He is the older brother of the Paraguayan-born Chilean former footballer Braulio Brizuela. His brother, Eliezer, has served as President of Chilean club Deportes Rancagua.

He acquired Chilean citizenship by residence and made his home in Rancagua after his retirement. Later, he returned to his city of birth.
