= Omar Gómez (footballer, born 1965) =

Argentine-Paraguayan footballer

Personal information
- Full name: Omar Darío Gómez Ortigoza
- Date of birth: 28 December 1965 (age 60)
- Place of birth: Buenos Aires, Argentina
- Position: Attacking midfielder

Youth career
- Cerro Porteño

Senior career*
Years	Team	Apps	(Gls)
1983–1986	Cerro Porteño		
1987–1988	Deportivo Pereira		
1989	Guaraní		
1990	Atlético Tembetary		
1991–1992	Guaraní		
1993	Deportes Antofagasta	30	(2)
1994	Everton	23	(1)
1995–1996	Huachipato	60	(15)
1997	Tecos		
1998	Deportes Temuco	5	(0)
1998–1999	Jaguares de Colima		
2000	Barcelona SC		
2001	Provincial Osorno		(2)
2002	Deportes Iquique		(1)
2003	Deportes Antofagasta		(0)
- * Club domestic league appearances and goals

Omar Darío Gómez Ortigoza (born 28 December 1965) is a former Argentine-Paraguayan footballer who played as an attacking midfielder.

== Career ==
- (Paraguay) Cerro Porteño 1983–1986
- (Colombia) Deportivo Pereira 1987–1988
- (Paraguay) Guaraní 1989
- (Paraguay) Atlético Tembetary 1990
- (Paraguay) Guaraní 1991–1992
- (Chile) Deportes Antofagasta 1993
- (Chile) Everton 1993–1994
- (Chile) Huachipato 1995–1996
- (Mexico) Tecos 1997
- (Chile) Deportes Temuco 1998
- (Mexico) Jaguares de Colima 1998–1999
- (Ecuador) Barcelona SC 2000
- (Chile) Provincial Osorno 2001
- (Chile) Deportes Iquique 2002
- (Chile) Deportes Antofagasta 2003
