= 1985 Campeonato Nacional Primera División =

Campeonato Nacional 1985
- Dates: 11 May 1985 – 5 January 1986
- Champions: Cobreloa (3rd title)
- Relegated: Deportes Arica; O'Higgins
- 1986 Copa Libertadores: Universidad Católica (Liguilla winners); Cobresal (Playoff winners)
- Matches: 380
- Goals: 955 (2.51 per match)
- Top goalscorer: Ivo Basay (19 goals)
- Biggest home win: Cobreloa 8–1 Magallanes (29 December)
- Highest attendance: 61,161 Universidad de Chile 0–3 Colo-Colo (1 September)
- Total attendance: 1,857,794
- Average attendance: 4,889

The 1985 Campeonato Nacional was Chilean football league top tier's 53rd season. Cobreloa was the tournament's champion, winning its third title.

== League table ==
Pos	Team	Pld	W	D	L	GF	GA	GD	Pts	Qualification or relegation
1	Cobreloa	38	21	10	7	65	24	+41	52	Champions & qualified to Pre-Copa Libertadores Playoff
2	Everton	38	19	12	7	43	33	+10	50	Qualified to Liguilla Pre-Copa Libertadores
3	Colo-Colo	38	19	11	8	58	35	+23	49	
4	Unión Española	38	18	12	8	56	39	+17	48	Qualified to Liguilla Pre-Copa Libertadores
5	Cobresal (Note: Qualified to Pre-libertadores play-off as 1984 Campeonato Nacional Runners-up)	38	18	10	10	66	40	+26	46	
6	Universidad Católica (Note: Qualified to Liguilla Pre-libertadores as 1984 Campeonato Nacional Champions)	38	17	11	10	59	49	+10	45	
7	Palestino	38	14	12	12	66	56	+10	40	
8	Rangers	38	14	12	12	45	41	+4	40	Qualified to Liguilla Pre-Copa Libertadores
9	Universidad de Chile	38	15	9	14	55	55	0	39	
10	Magallanes	38	15	9	14	53	58	−5	39	
11	Naval	38	12	14	12	51	48	+3	38	
12	Huachipato	38	12	12	14	33	45	−12	36	
13	Unión La Calera	38	11	13	14	55	57	−2	35	
14	Audax Italiano	38	12	10	16	37	44	−7	34	
15	Deportes Iquique	38	9	14	15	39	50	−11	32	
16	Deportes Concepción	38	10	11	17	34	59	−25	31	
17	Unión San Felipe	38	8	14	16	30	49	−19	30	
18	San Luis	38	8	12	18	30	48	−18	28	
19	Deportes Arica	38	7	13	18	40	58	−18	27	Relegated to Segunda División
20	O'Higgins	38	5	11	22	40	67	−27	21	Relegated to Segunda División

Notes:

Campeonato Nacional
1985 champions
Cobreloa
3rd title

== Results ==
Home \ Away	DAR	AUD	CLO	CSA	COL	DCO	EVE	HUA	DIQ	MAG	NAV	OHI	PAL	RAN	SFE	SLU	LCA	UCA	UCH	UES
Arica		1–0	1–2	1–1	1–1	5–2	0–2	0–0	3–1	2–0	0–0	1–1	2–3	0–0	0–0	2–0	0–0	2–1	2–3	0–0
Audax	2–0		0–1	1–2	3–1	0–0	0–1	3–2	0–0	2–0	1–4	1–0	1–5	1–1	1–0	2–2	3–1	1–2	2–2	1–2
Cobreloa	4–0	2–0		2–3	0–0	4–1	1–1	1–0	5–1	8–1	3–0	2–0	2–1	2–2	5–0	1–0	3–0	1–1	1–0	1–0
Cobresal	2–1	1–0	2–0		3–1	3–0	3–1	3–0	3–1	1–0	3–1	5–0	1–2	2–0	4–0	0–0	4–2	6–2	1–2	1–0
Colo-Colo	4–3	1–0	1–0	2–2		0–0	1–1	3–0	1–0	3–2	2–1	1–0	1–1	1–1	4–0	3–0	0–0	4–1	3–1	4–2
Concepción	2–1	2–0	1–1	2–1	0–1		0–0	1–0	1–0	0–1	2–4	3–2	3–2	0–1	2–1	1–1	2–1	1–2	0–1	0–0
Everton	3–1	1–0	1–0	1–1	1–0	1–0		0–0	2–0	0–1	1–1	1–1	2–1	1–1	3–1	1–0	2–1	2–1	2–0	1–0
Huachipato	1–0	1–1	0–4	2–0	0–1	2–1	0–0		5–2	0–0	0–3	1–0	1–1	1–1	1–0	0–1	0–0	0–0	1–3	1–1
Iquique	2–0	1–1	0–0	1–1	1–0	2–2	2–2	0–1		1–0	0–0	0–0	1–1	1–0	2–2	2–0	5–3	3–1	2–1	1–1
Magallanes	2–1	1–1	0–2	2–1	2–1	1–0	2–2	4–1	3–1		1–1	6–3	1–2	4–2	1–1	0–0	1–5	0–2	3–2	2–2
Naval	1–2	0–1	1–1	1–0	1–2	0–0	0–1	0–1	3–1	0–1		1–1	2–1	1–0	1–1	1–0	2–3	1–1	2–1	0–0
O'Higgins	0–0	0–1	0–0	0–0	2–5	4–1	1–2	0–2	1–3	2–0	1–2		1–3	2–4	0–0	3–0	0–1	1–2	1–1	2–3
Palestino	5–0	0–0	1–2	0–0	1–1	1–1	5–0	1–1	1–0	1–4	4–5	1–2		2–0	2–1	3–1	2–1	3–2	1–1	1–3
Rangers	1–0	1–1	0–1	2–1	1–0	0–1	0–2	1–0	1–0	0–0	1–2	3–1	4–0		2–2	3–3	1–0	4–1	2–3	0–1
San Felipe	0–0	1–0	0–0	0–0	0–0	4–0	0–1	2–0	1–0	1–1	1–0	1–0	2–2	1–1		2–1	2–1	1–3	1–2	0–2
San Luis	3–2	0–1	1–0	0–0	0–1	0–0	0–0	1–2	2–1	2–0	1–0	2–2	1–2	0–0	1–1		4–3	1–3	0–1	1–0
La Calera	1–1	1–0	1–0	2–2	1–1	1–0	2–0	3–0	1–1	1–3	1–1	4–4	1–1	0–1	1–0	2–0		0–2	2–2	2–2
U. Católica	3–3	2–3	2–2	3–0	1–0	5–0	2–0	0–2	0–0	2–1	1–1	1–0	2–1	0–1	2–0	0–0	2–1		0–0	0–0
U. de Chile	2–0	1–0	0–1	4–3	0–3	6–2	2–1	1–1	0–0	0–1	4–4	1–2	1–0	1–2	2–0	1–0	1–1	1–2		1–4
U. Española	3–2	1–2	1–0	1–0	2–0	0–0	2–0	2–3	1–0	2–1	3–3	2–0	2–2	2–0	1–0	2–1	2–4	2–2	2–0	

Legend: Blue = home team win; Yellow = draw; Red = away team win.

== Topscorer ==
Name	Team	Goals
(Chile) Ivo Basay	Magallanes	19

== Liguilla Pre-Copa Libertadores ==
8 January 1986	Universidad Católica	2 – 1	Unión Española	Estadio Santa Laura, Santiago
	Lepe 24'; Mardones 82'		21' (o.g.) Abarca	Attendance: 8,939; Referee: E. Marín

8 January 1986	Everton	1 – 2	Rangers	Estadio Sausalito, Viña del Mar
	Figueroa 80'		47' Nau; 76' Soto	Attendance: 7,696; Referee: H. Silva

11 January 1986	Rangers	2 – 0	Unión Española	Estadio Fiscal, Talca
	Prieto 1'; Espinoza 79'			Attendance: 14,160; Referee: M. Lira

11 January 1986	Everton	1 – 1	Universidad Católica	Estadio Sausalito, Viña del Mar
	Pino 39'		48' Neira	Attendance: 8,535; Referee: G. Castro

14 January 1986	Unión Española	1 – 3	Everton	Estadio Nacional, Santiago
	Jáuregui 74'		24', 72' Figueroa; 60' Morales	Attendance: 21,224; Referee: G. Budge

14 January 1986	Universidad Católica	2 – 1	Rangers	Estadio Nacional, Santiago
	Neira 6'; Vargas 49'		Espinoza 43'	Attendance: 21,224; Referee: S. Vásquez

Pos	Team	Pld	W	D	L	GF	GA	GD	Pts	Qualification
1	Universidad Católica	3	2	1	0	5	3	+2	5	Qualified to 1986 Copa Libertadores
2	Rangers	3	2	0	1	5	3	+2	4	
3	Everton	3	1	1	1	5	4	+1	3	
4	Unión Española	3	0	0	3	2	7	−5	0	

== Pre-Copa Libertadores play-off ==
Played between 1985 League champions and 1984 League runners-up.

18 January 1986	Cobreloa	0 – 0	Cobresal	Estadio Municipal, Calama
				Attendance: 7,279; Referee: V. Ojeda

22 January 1986	Cobresal	2 – 0	Cobreloa	Estadio El Cobre, El Salvador
	Reyes 20' (pen.); Martínez 39'			Attendance: 7,844; Referee: M. Lira

Cobresal qualified for the 1986 Copa Libertadores

== See also ==
- 1985 Copa Polla Gol
