= 2014 Torneo Clausura (Primera B de Chile) =

Primera B de Chile
- Season: 2013–14 Primera B
- Champions: San Marcos de Arica

The 2014 Torneo Clausura was part of the 64th completed season of the Primera B de Chile.

San Marcos de Arica was tournament's champion.

== League table ==
Pos	Team	Pld	W	D	L	GF	GA	GD	Pts	Perf.
1	Coquimbo Unido	19	12	3	4	29	19	+10	39	68,4%
2	San Marcos de Arica	19	9	7	3	26	14	+12	34	59,6%
3	Curicó Unido	19	7	6	6	19	17	+2	27	47,3%
4	Lota Schwager	19	7	6	6	17	15	+2	27	47,3%
5	Deportes Copiapó	19	7	6	6	20	24	−4	27	47,3%
6	Barnechea	19	6	8	5	25	17	+8	26	45,6%
7	Deportes La Serena	19	7	5	7	24	26	−2	26	45,6%
8	Santiago Morning	19	7	5	7	18	20	−2	26	45,6%
9	Deportes Concepción	19	6	7	6	23	20	+3	25	43,8%
10	Deportes Temuco	19	6	7	6	23	25	−2	25	43,8%
11	Magallanes	19	5	6	8	29	31	−2	21	36,8%
12	Unión San Felipe	19	4	7	8	24	24	0	19	33,3%
13	San Luis de Quillota	19	4	6	9	26	34	−8	18	31,5%
14	Naval	19	5	3	11	15	32	−17	18	31,5%
