= Deportes Valdivia =

Chilean football club

Club Deportes Valdivia
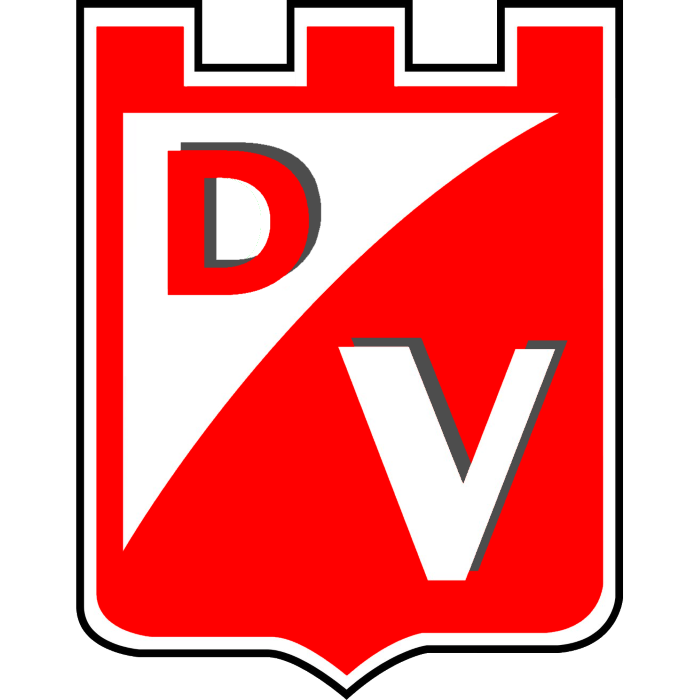
- Full name: Club de Deportes Valdivia
- Nickname: El Torreón
- Founded: June 5th, 1983
- Ground: Estadio Parque Municipal; Valdivia; Chile
- Capacity: 5,000
- Chairman: Jorge Salazar
- Manager: Luis Marcoleta
- League: Segunda División
- 2020: Primera B, 14th (relegated by weighted table)
Home colours	Away colours

Deportes Valdivia is a Chilean football club in the town of Valdivia, Chile. It currently plays in Segunda División, the third level of Chilean football.

The club was founded on June 5, 1983, and re-founded on December 19, 2003.

== Honours ==
- Chilean Segunda División

Winners (1): 2015–16

- Apertura Tercera División (Cup)

Winners (1): 2006

== Seasons played ==
- 2 seasons in Primera División
- 11 seasons in Primera B
- 12 seasons in Third Level (Segunda and Tercera División)
- 2 seasons in Cuarta División

== Records ==
- Record Primera División victory — 3–0 v. Cobresal, F. Vial & U. Católica (1988)
- Record Copa Chile victory — 5–0 v. Cobreandino (1989)
- Record Primera División defeat — 0–6 v. D. La Serena & U. San Felipe (1989)
- Most Primera División appearances — 58, Pedro González (1988–89)
- Most goals scored (Primera División matches) — 12, Luis Marcoleta (1988)
- Highest home attendance — 7,533 v. Colo-Colo (July 2, 1989)
- Primera División Best Position — 10th (1988)
- Copa Chile Best Season — Semifinals (1989)

== Current squad ==
Current squad of Deportes Valdivia as of 27 September 2021 (edit)
Sources: ANFP Official Web Site

No.		Position	Player
1	CHI	GK	Paulo Garcés
3	CHI	DF	Ramiro Gálvez
4	CHI	DF	Agustín Ambiado
5	CHI	DF	Maximiliano Riveros
6	CHI	MF	Víctor Labrín
7	CHI	MF	Cristián Canío
8	CHI	MF	Pablo Leal
9	ARG	FW	Emiliano Bonfigli
10	CHI	MF	Leonardo Uribe
11	CHI	FW	Lucas Fierro
13	CHI	DF	Max Gatica
14	CHI	DF	Matías Fernández
15	PLE	MF	Pablo Tamburrini
16	CHI	DF	Josué Filún
17	ARG	FW	Axel Arce
18	CHI	DF	Dagoberto Currimilla

No.		Position	Player
19	CHI	DF	Ignacio Torres
20	CHI	DF	Christian Jelves
21	CHI	DF	Joaquín López
22	CHI	MF	Jaime Opazo
23	ARG	FW	Facundo Krüger
24	CHI	MF	Nicolás Guerra
25	CHI	GK	Manuel Torres
26	CHI	FW	Xabier Santos
27	ARG	FW	Rodrigo Linares
28	CHI	MF	Luis Fuentes
30	CHI	FW	Wilson Martínez
31	CHI	GK	David Pérez
32	CHI	MF	Jaime Vera
33	CHI	FW	Agustín Urra
--	CHI	GK	Diego Fuentes
--	CHI	GK	Pablo Pilar

Manager: Luis Marcoleta

=== 2021 winter transfers ===
==== In ====
Note: Flags indicate national team as defined under FIFA eligibility rules; some limited exceptions apply. Players may hold more than one non-FIFA nationality.

No.	Pos.	Nation	Player
1	GK	CHI	Paulo Garcés (from San Luis)
15	MF	PLE	Pablo Tamburrini (free)

No.	Pos.	Nation	Player
28	MF	CHI	Luis Fuentes (from Cobreloa)

==== Out ====
Note: Flags indicate national team as defined under FIFA eligibility rules; some limited exceptions apply. Players may hold more than one non-FIFA nationality.

No.	Pos.	Nation	Player
24	MF	CHI	Matías Casas (released)

== Managers ==
- (Chile) Jorge Venegas (1985–1986)
- (Argentina) Gerardo Reinoso (2014–15)
- (Chile) Hugo Balladares (2015–2016)
- (Argentina) Ricardo Lunari (2016)

== See also ==
- Chilean football league system
