= Deportes Ovalle =

Chilean football club

- Full name: Club de Deportes Ovalle S.A.D.P.
- Nickname: Los Verdes del Limarí (The Green from Limarí)
- Founded: 1 January 1963; 63 years ago (as Club de Deportes Ovalle Ferroviarios)
- Ground: Estadio Diaguita; Ovalle, Chile
- Capacity: 5,160
- Chairman: Luis Carlos Contreras
- Manager: Ramón Contreras
- League: Tercera B
- 2015–16: Segunda División Profesional, 8th of 13
Home colours	Away colours

Club Deportes Ovalle is a Chilean football club based in the city of Ovalle, Chile. They currently plays in the fifth level of Chilean football, the Tercera B. The club's stadium is the Estadio Diaguita.

Their main rivals are Club Social y Deportivo Ovalle, Provincial Ovalle, Deportes La Serena and Coquimbo Unido.

== Seasons ==
- Seasons in Primera División: 2 (1976, 1977)
- Seasons in Segunda División/Primera B: 37 (1963–1967, 1970–1975, 1978–1991, 1994–2005)
- Seasons in Segunda División Profesional: 2 (2014–15, 2015–16)
- Seasons in Tercera División/Tercera A: 9 (1992–1993, 2006–2012)
- Seasons in Tercera B: 1 (2026–)

== Honours ==
=== Domestic honours ===
- Copa Chile
  - Finalists (1): 2008–09
- Tercera Division
  - Winners (1): 1993

== Players ==
=== Current roster ===
As of 7 April 2026 Note: Flags indicate national team as defined under FIFA eligibility rules; some limited exceptions apply. Players may hold more than one non-FIFA nationality.

No.	Pos.	Nation	Player
1	GK	CHI	Patricio Cortés (c)
2	DF	CHI	Matías Pizarro
3	DF	CHI	David Henríquez
4	DF	CHI	Marcos Castillo
6	MF	CHI	Mario Vega
7	FW	CHI	Xabier Santos
8	MF	CHI	Daniel Carrera
9	FW	CHI	Aaron Valencia
10	MF	CHI	Luis Rodríguez
11	FW	CHI	Dilan Barraza
12	GK	CHI	Josué López
13	DF	CHI	Vicente López
14	DF	CHI	Javier Medalla
15	MF	CHI	Daniel Seura

No.	Pos.	Nation	Player
17	MF	CHI	Johans Barraza
18	MF	CHI	Matías Rivas
19	FW	CHI	Lucas Barraza
20	DF	CHI	Sebastián Castro
21	MF	CHI	Daniel Acuña
22	MF	CHI	Vicente Rojas
23	FW	CHI	Bastián Jaime
24	DF	CHI	Jesús Araya
25	GK	CHI	Ignacio Huerta
26	FW	CHI	Luis Díaz
27	MF	CHI	Martín Díaz
28	DF	CHI	Guillermo Zuleta
29	FW	CHI	Yhostin Montenegro
30	MF	CHI	Nicolás Lizardi

== Notable players ==
- (Argentina) Ciro Ocampo
- (Argentina) Julio Ortiz
- (Chile) Danilo Chacón
- (Chile) Rodolfo Dubó
- (Chile) Eduardo Gómez
- (Chile) Osvaldo Gómez
- (Chile) Rubén Gómez
- (Chile) Gustavo Huerta
- (Chile) Sergio Recabarren
- (Chile) Francisco Silva
- (Chile) Hugo Tabilo
- (Socialist Federal Republic of Yugoslavia) Ferid Hatibović

== Managers ==
- (Peru) (Chile) José Balbuena (1963)
- (Argentina) Donato Hernández (1964–1965)
- (Chile) Fidel Cuiña (1966–1967)
- (Chile) Sergio Recabarren (1970)
- (Uruguay) Adolfo Rodríguez (1970–1971)
- (Chile) Isaac Carrasco (1972)
- (Uruguay) Adolfo Rodríguez (1973)
- (Chile) Luis Santibáñez (1974)
- (Chile) Guillermo Díaz (1975–1977)
- (Uruguay) Adolfo Rodríguez (1978)
- (Chile) Claudio Ramírez (1979–1980)
- (Uruguay) Adolfo Rodríguez (1981)
- (Chile) Edmundo Rojas (1982)
- (Argentina) Donato Hernández (1984)
- (Chile) Humberto Cruz (1985)
- (Chile) Edmundo Rojas (1987)
- (Chile) Hugo Valdivia (1988)
- (Chile) Edmundo Rojas (1988)
- (Chile) Jorge Venegas (1989)
- (Chile) José Sulantay (1989–1990)
- (Chile) Sergio Recabarren (1990)
- (Chile) Humberto Cruz (1990–1991)
- (Chile) Sergio Recabarren (1991)
- (Chile) Guillermo Díaz (1992)
- (Chile) Gustavo Huerta (1993–1995)
- (Chile) Edmundo Rojas (1996–1997)
- (Chile) Hernán Ibarra (1997–2001)
- (Chile) Rubén Gómez (2002)
- (Chile) Edmundo Rojas (2003)
- (Chile) Hernán Ibarra (2004)
- (Chile) Danilo Chacón (2005)
- (Chile) Alexis Ortega (2006)
- (Chile) Hernán Castro (2006–2007)
- (Chile) Miguel Alegre (2008–2009)
- (Chile) Christian Muñoz (2009)
- (Chile) Francisco Moraga (2010)
- (Chile) Danilo Chacón (2011)
- (Chile) Edmundo Rojas (2012)
- (Chile) Ramón Climent (2012)
- (Chile) Ramón Contreras (2014–2015)
- (Chile) Danilo Chacón (2015)
- (Chile) Leandro Zepeda (2015)
- (Chile) Danilo Chacón (2016)
- (Chile) Hernán Ibarra (2022–2025)
- (Chile) Juan Castillo (2026)
- (Chile) Ramón Contreras (2026–)
