= San Marcos de Arica =

- Full name: Club Deportivo San Marcos de Arica
- Nicknames: CDA; Celeste ariqueña Bravos de Arica; Los Bravos del Morro
- Founded: 14 February 1978; 48 years ago as Deportes Arica
- Ground: Estadio Carlos Dittborn, Arica, Chile
- Capacity: 9,625
- Chairman: Carlos Ferry
- Manager: Iván Sandrock
- League: Primera B
- 2025: Primera B, 4th of 16
Home colours	Away colours

Club Deportivo San Marcos de Arica is a Chilean professional football club based in Arica, Arica y Parinacota Region.

Founded on 14 February 1978, the club currently competes in the Primera B de Chile, the second tier of the Chilean football league system. San Marcos play their home matches at the Estadio Carlos Dittborn.

The club was originally founded as Norte-Arica and was later known as Deportes Arica before adopting its current name in 2005. San Marcos first reached the Primera División after winning the Second Division in 1981, and returned to the top flight in 2012 and 2014. The club has also won titles in the third and fourth tiers of Chilean football.

== History ==
=== Foundation and early years ===
San Marcos de Arica was founded on 14 February 1978, originally under the name Norte-Arica, following efforts by the local clubs Arica Portuario and Norte Unido to establish a professional football team representing the city of Arica. The newly formed club was admitted to the Chilean Second Division for the 1978 season and soon adopted the name Club de Deportes Arica, by which it would be known for most of its early history.

The club quickly established itself as a competitive Second Division side. After narrowly missing promotion during its first seasons, Deportes Arica enjoyed a breakthrough campaign in 1981 under manager Alicel Belmar. The team won the Campeonato de Apertura de Segunda División and subsequently secured the Second Division championship, earning promotion to the Primera División for the first time in its history. The achievement established professional football in Arica at the highest level only three years after the club's foundation.

Deportes Arica made its Primera División debut in 1982 and remained in the top flight for four consecutive seasons. Playing its home matches at the Estadio Carlos Dittborn, the club developed a reputation as a difficult opponent, particularly at home. During this period, Arica recorded notable victories over several of Chile's leading clubs, including Universidad de Chile, Universidad Católica and Cobreloa.

Among the club's most notable results of the period was a 3–1 away victory over Colo-Colo at the Estadio Nacional in 1984. The club also recorded several high-scoring victories during its early years in the top division, including a 7–2 win over Unión San Felipe in 1983. However, the successful period came to an end in 1985, when Deportes Arica finished 19th in the 20-team championship and was relegated to the Second Division.

=== Decline and return to professional football ===
Following relegation, Deportes Arica spent the next two decades in the second tier. The club experienced a prolonged period of sporting and financial difficulties and was unable to reproduce the success of its early years. These problems culminated in relegation from Primera B in 2005, bringing an end to twenty-seven consecutive seasons in Chilean professional football.

Ahead of its participation in the Tercera División, the institution underwent a reorganisation and adopted the name San Marcos de Arica. After two seasons outside the professional divisions, the club won the 2007 Tercera División championship. A 1–1 draw against Colchagua on 2 December 2007 secured the title and returned San Marcos to Primera B for the following season.

After consolidating its position in Primera B, San Marcos entered one of the most successful periods in its history during the early 2010s. Under manager Luis Marcoleta, the club produced an outstanding 2012 campaign, winning the Primera B Apertura after a goalless draw against Deportes Concepción.

San Marcos maintained its form during the second half of the season and also won the Clausura tournament. By finishing with the highest aggregate points total across both competitions, the club was crowned 2012 Primera B champion and earned automatic promotion to the Primera División, ending a 27-year absence from Chile's top flight.

The club's return proved short-lived. San Marcos competed in the 2013 Torneo de Transición, but the competition's relegation coefficient placed the newly promoted side at a considerable disadvantage. The club finished at the bottom of the relegation table and immediately returned to Primera B. San Marcos responded quickly. During the 2013–14 Primera B season, the club again emerged as one of the division's strongest teams and secured another promotion to the Primera División in 2014.

=== Further relegations and recovery ===
San Marcos remained in the Primera División for two seasons before returning to Primera B. The following years were characterised by further instability, and in 2018 the club finished last in the Primera B standings, resulting in relegation to the Segunda División Profesional.

The stay in the third tier lasted only one season. San Marcos led the 2019 Segunda División campaign before the competition was suspended amid the social unrest in Chile. Following the early termination of the national competitions, the club was ultimately recognised as champion of the division and promoted back to Primera B.

Since returning to the second tier, San Marcos has again established itself in professional football, continuing the pattern of promotion, relegation and recovery that has characterised much of its history. The club's achievements include three Primera B championships, alongside titles in the Tercera División and Segunda División Profesional, making it one of the most prominent professional clubs from Chile's extreme north.

== Players ==
=== Current squad ===
Current squad of San Marcos de Arica as of 11 July 2026 (edit)
Sources: ANFP Official Web Site

No.		Position	Player
1	ARG	GK	Rodrigo Saracho
2	CHI	DF	Reiner Campos
3	CHI	DF	Yerko Águila
4	CHI	MF	Mauricio Iturra
5	CHI	DF	Javier Rivera
6	ARG	DF	Nicolás Aguirre
7	CHI	FW	Bairon Monroy
8	CHI	DF	Augusto Barrios
9	CHI	FW	Camilo Melivilú
10	CHI	MF	Boris Sagredo
11	PLE	FW	Nicolás Zedán
12	CHI	GK	Cristóbal Parraguez
13	CHI	GK	Benjamín Tapia
14	CHI	DF	Cristóbal Guerra
15	CHI	DF	Guillermo Cubillos
16	CHI	FW	Gonzalo Reyes
17	CHI	DF	Matías Moya
18	CHI	MF	Adriano Galleguillos
19	ARG	MF	Agustín Maidana

No.		Position	Player
20	ARG	MF	Alfredo Ábalos
21	CHI	FW	Nicolás Orrego
22	ARG	FW	Nahuel Donadell
23	ARG	DF	Álvaro Cazula
24	CHI	MF	D'Hidier Pereira
26	CHI	MF	Camilo Rencoret (c)
27	CHI	DF	Isaac Orrego
28	CHI	DF	Nicolás Rivera
29	CHI	FW	Diego Bravo
30	CHI	GK	Josaphat Muñoz
31	CHI	DF	Daniel Larrondo
32	CHI	FW	Milan Tudor (loan from Universidad Católica)
33	CHI	FW	Evans Benavides
34	URU	DF	Andrés Barboza
36	CHI	FW	Benjamín Ramírez
37	CHI	MF	Alfredo Rosales
38	CHI	DF	Pablo Vallejos
39	CHI	GK	Vicente Gallegos

Manager: Iván Sandrock

== Managers ==
- (Chile) Jorge Luco (1978)
- (Chile) Manuel Muñoz (1978)
- (Chile) Isaac Carrasco (1979)
- (Chile) Pedro García (1979)
- (Chile) Claudio Ramírez (1980)
- (Chile) Jorge Casanova (1980)
- (Chile) Manuel Rodríguez (1980)
- (Chile) Manuel Muñoz (1980)
- (Chile) Alicel Belmar (1981)
- (Chile) Ramón Estay (1982-1984)
- (Chile) Adolfo Robles (1984-1985)
- (Chile) Ramón Estay (1985)
- (Chile) Hernán Godoy (1986)
- (Chile) Manuel Muñoz (1986-1987)
- (Chile) Luis Ramírez (1988)
- (Chile) Alicel Belmar (1988)
- (Chile) Aurelio Valenzuela (1989)
- (Chile) Alicel Belmar (1989)
- (Chile) Hugo Solís (1990)
- (Chile) Jorge Molina (1990)
- (Chile) Hernán Godoy (1990)
- (Chile) Daniel Díaz (1991)
- (Chile) Adolfo Robles (1991)
- (Chile) Leonel Herrera (1992)
- (Chile) Hernán Godoy (1993)
- (Chile) Hernán Ibarra (1994)
- (Chile) Hernán Godoy (1994)
- (Chile) Adolfo Robles (1995)
- (Chile) Osvaldo Hurtado (1995)
- (Chile) Esaú Bravo (1996)
- (Chile) Hernán Ibarra (1996)
- (Chile) Eugenio Jara (1997)
- (Chile) Hugo Solís (1997)
- (Chile) Rolando García (1998)
- (Chile) Jaime Carreño (1998-1999)
- (Chile) Hernán Godoy (2000)
- (Chile) Adolfo Robles (2001)
- (Chile) Luis Santibáñez (2001)
- (Argentina) Carlos Medina (2002)
- (Chile) Jaime Carreño (2002)
- (Chile) Carlos Molina (2003)
- (Chile) Hernán Ibarra (2003)
- (Argentina) Carlos Medina (2004)
- (Chile) Germán Cornejo (2004)
- (Paraguay) (Chile) Sergio Nichiporuk (2005)
- (Chile) Juan Ubilla (2005)
- (Chile) Manuel Soto (2006)
- (Chile) Miguel Alegre (2007)
- (Chile) Orlando Mondaca (2008-2009)
- (Chile) Hernán Godoy (2009-2010)
- (Chile) Hernán Ibarra (2011)
- (Chile) Luis Marcoleta (2011-2014)
- (Chile) Fernando Díaz (2014)
- (Chile) Kenny Mamani (2014)
- (Chile) Fernando Vergara (2015)
- (Chile) Marco Antonio Figueroa (2015-2016)
- (Chile) Emiliano Astorga (2016)
- (Argentina) (Chile) Ariel Pereyra (2017)
- (Chile) Luis Musrri (2018)
- (Chile) Hernán Godoy (2018)
- (Chile) Felipe Cornejo (2019)
- (Chile) Hernán Peña (2020-2022)
- (Chile) Francisco Arrué (2023)
- (Chile) Víctor Barría (2023-2024)
- (Argentina) Germán Cavalieri (2024-2025)
- (Chile) Iván Sandrock (2026-)

== Honors ==
- Primera B: 3

1981, 2012, 2014 Clausura

- Segunda División Profesional

2019

- Copa Campeones: 1

1982

- Copa Apertura Segunda División: 1

1981

- Tercera División: 1

2007

== Seasons ==
- 7 seasons in Primera División
- 35 seasons in Primera B
- 2 seasons in Segunda División Profesional
- 2 seasons in Tercera División
