= Guajardo =

Guajardo is a Spanish surname that may refer to:

- Andrés Guajardo (1930–2000), Spanish jurist, businessman and politician
- Anisa Guajardo (born 1991), Mexican-American football striker
- Carlos Alberto Guajardo Romero (1973–2010), Mexican journalist
- Daniela Guajardo (born 1990), Chilean road cyclist
- Fabiola Guajardo (born 1987), Mexican actress and model
- Ildefonso Guajardo Villarreal (born 1957), Mexican economist and politician
- Juan Antonio Guajardo Anzaldúa (1958–2007), Mexican politician
- Jorge Guajardo, Mexican politician and diplomat
- Luis Guajardo (born 1973), Chilean football player
- Mary Telma Guajardo (born 1959), Mexican politician
- Rafael Aguilar Guajardo (1950–1993), Mexican drug lord and federal police commander
- René Guajardo (1933–1992), Mexican professional wrestler
- Roberto Guajardo Suárez (1918–2008), Mexican lawyer
- Víctor Guajardo (born 1990), Mexican football player
