= Pablo Parmo =

Argentine footballer

Personal information
- Full name: Pablo Oscar Parmo
- Date of birth: 19 August 1979 (age 47)
- Place of birth: Lomas de Zamora, Buenos Aires, Argentina
- Height: 1.64 m (5 ft 5 in)
- Position: Midfielder

Youth career
- Racing Club
- Independiente

Senior career*
Years	Team	Apps	(Gls)
1999	Independiente	0	(0)
2000	Racing Montevideo	0	(0)
2000–2001	Fénix	8	(0)
2001–2004	Inter Turku	31	(5)
2002	→ VG-62 (loan)	40	(14)
2005	YF Juventus	16	(3)
2006	Cobreloa	6	(0)
2007	Trujillanos	12	(0)
2008–2009	Arnedo	–	(–)

Managerial career
- 2022: Rangers de Talca (youth)
- 2022: Rangers de Talca (assistant)
- * Club domestic league appearances and goals

Pablo Oscar Parmo (born August 19, 1979, in Lomas de Zamora (Buenos Aires), Argentina) is a former Argentine footballer who played for clubs of Argentina, Uruguay, Finland, Switzerland, Malaysia, Chile, Venezuela, Italy and Spain.

== Playing career ==
=== Teams ===
- (Argentina) Racing Club (youth)
- (Argentina) Independiente 1999
- (Uruguay) Racing Club de Montevideo 2000
- (Argentina) Fénix 2000-2001
- (Finland) Inter Turku 2001–2002
- (Finland) VG-62 Naantali 2002
- (Finland) Inter Turku 2003-2004
- (Switzerland) YF Juventus 2005
- (Chile) Cobreloa 2006
- (Venezuela) Trujillanos 2007
- (Spain) Arnedo 2008–2009

== Coaching career ==
Parmo became a sports coach. He has mainly worked as coach in tennis and mini-tennis.

As a football coach, he worked for the Rangers de Talca youth system and served as the assistant coach of Eduardo Pinto in 2022.

== Personal life ==
Parmo holds an Italian passport since 2004.
