= Juan Méndez =

Juan Méndez may refer to:

- Juan Méndez de Villafranca (?–1577), Archbishop of Santa Marta
- Juan Méndez de Salvatierra, Archbishop of the Roman Catholic Archdiocese of Granada, 1577–1588
- Juan N. Méndez (1820–1894), Mexican politician and general, interim President of the Republic in 1876-77
- Juanín (footballer, born 1925) (Juan Cortiñas Méndez, born 1925), Spanish football midfielder
- Juan E. Méndez (born 1944), Argentine human rights lawyer, United Nations Secretary-General's Special Adviser on the Prevention of Genocide
- Juan Carlos Méndez (1945–2013), one of the Chicago Boys
- Juan Mendez (basketball) (born 1981), Canadian basketball player
- Juan Mendez (politician) (born 1985), member of the Arizona Senate
- Juan Rafael Méndez (born 1985), Mexican football defender
- Juan Méndez (footballer) (born 1996), Chilean football midfielder
- Ignacio Méndez (Juan Ignacio Méndez, born 1997), Argentine football midfielder
