= Ángel Castelnoble =

Uruguayan football manager and player

Personal information
- Full name: Ángel Castelnoble
- Date of birth: 21 June 1946
- Place of birth: Montevideo, Uruguay
- Date of death: 22 June 2021 (aged 75)
- Place of death: Montevideo, Uruguay
- Position: Midfielder

Youth career
- 1958–1961: Montevideo Wanderers

Senior career*
Years	Team	Apps	(Gls)
- Montevideo Wanderers
- Argentine football
- Montevideo Wanderers
- Sud América
- Villa Española
- River Plate Montevideo
- Guaraní

Managerial career
- 1980: Montevideo Wanderers
- 1981: Miramar Misiones
- 1982: Nacional
- 1983: Montevideo Wanderers
- 1984: Olimpia
- 1985: Guaraní
- 1986: Huracán Buceo
- 1988: Emelec
- 1988: Emelec
- 1992–1993: Uruguay U20
- 1993: Uruguay U17
- 1994–1995: Montevideo Wanderers
- 1996: Emelec
- 1997: Millonarios
- 1998: Danubio
- 2000: Rangers
- 2000: Huracán Buceo
- 2002: Cerro
- 2004: Uruguay U17
- 2004–2005: Uruguay U20
- 2008–2009: Rampla Juniors
- * Club domestic league appearances and goals

Ángel Castelnoble (21 June 1946 – 22 June 2021) was a Uruguayan football manager and player who played as a midfielder.

== Playing career ==
A midfielder, Castelnoble joined Montevideo Wanderers in 1958 and made his professional debut at the age of 16.

In addition to Montevideo Wanderers, Castelnoble played for Sud América, Villa Española and River Plate in his homeland. Abroad, he had a brief stint in Argentine football and ended his career with Paraguayan club Guaraní, aged 33.

== Managerial career ==
- (Uruguay) Montevideo Wanderers 1980
- (Uruguay) Miramar Misiones 1981
- (Uruguay) Nacional 1982
- (Uruguay) Montevideo Wanderers 1983
- (Paraguay) Olimpia 1984
- (Paraguay) Guaraní 1985
- (Uruguay) Huracán Buceo 1986
- (Ecuador) Emelec 1988
- (Ecuador) Emelec 1989
- Uruguay U20 1992–1993
- Uruguay U17 1993
- (Uruguay) Montevideo Wanderers 1994–995
- (Ecuador) Emelec 1996
- (Colombia) Millonarios 1997
- (Uruguay) Danubio 1998
- (Chile) Rangers de Talca 2000
- (Uruguay) Huracán Buceo 2000
- (Uruguay) Cerro 2002
- Uruguay U17 2004
- Uruguay U20 2004–2005
- (Uruguay) Rampla Juniors 2008–2009
