= Damián González =

Uruguayan footballer

Personal information
- Full name: Damián González González
- Date of birth: 5 January 1993 (age 33)
- Place of birth: Montevideo, Uruguay
- Height: 1.78 m (5 ft 10 in)
- Position: Left winger

Team information
- Current team: Rangers
- Number: 19

Senior career*
Years	Team	Apps	(Gls)
2012	Bella Vista	1	(0)
2013–2015	Montevideo Wanderers	2	(0)
2014	→ Progreso (loan)	4	(0)
2015	→ Canadian (loan)	15	(1)
2015–2017	Rentistas	40	(1)
2017–2021	Juventud Las Piedras	76	(4)
2021–2022	Cerrito	33	(0)
2022–2023	Universidad de Concepción	44	(3)
2024–2025	Deportes Temuco	53	(5)
2026–	Rangers	0	(0)
- * Club domestic league appearances and goals as of 25 April 2024

Damián González González (born 5 January 1993) is a Uruguayan footballer who plays as a left winger for Chilean club Rangers. He can also operate as a left-back.

== Club career ==
Born in Montevideo, Uruguay, González started his career with Bella Vista in 2012. In 2013, he switched to Montevideo Wanderers.

In his homeland, he also has played for Progreso (loan), Canadian (loan), Rentistas, Juventud Las Piedras and Cerrito.

In the second half of 2022, González moved abroad and signed with Universidad de Concepción in the Primera B de Chile.

In 2024, González switched to Deportes Temuco. Two seasons later, he joined Rangers de Talca.

== Personal life ==
He is nicknamed Bala (Bullet) due to his speed.
