= Walter Behrends =

Argentine footballer (1929–2005)

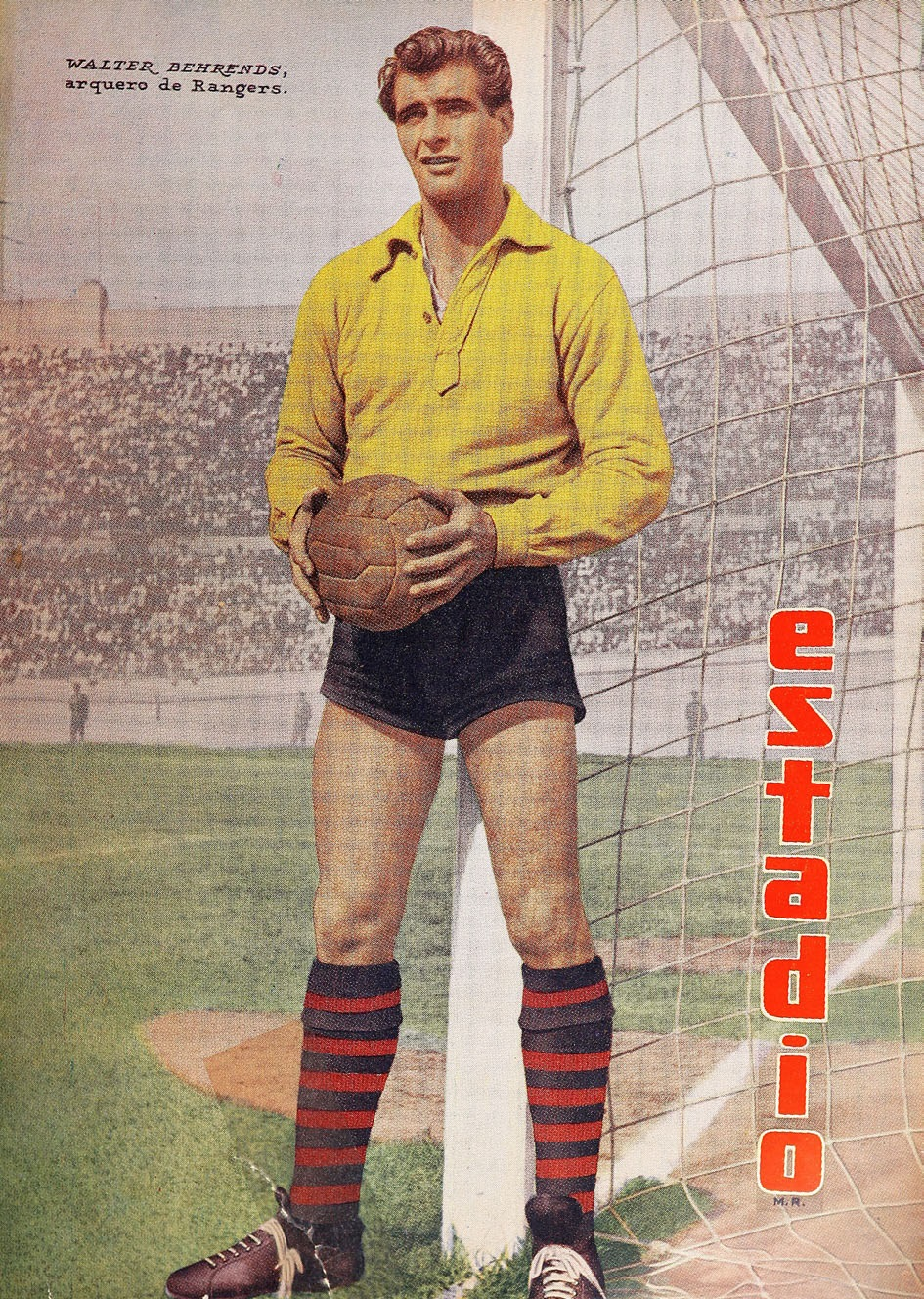

Personal information
- Full name: Walter Carlos Behrends Donovara
- Date of birth: 24 September 1929
- Place of birth: La Plata, Argentina
- Date of death: 21 January 2005 (aged 75)
- Place of death: Talca, Chile
- Height: 1.91 m (6 ft 3 in)
- Position: Goalkeeper

Senior career*
Years	Team	Apps	(Gls)
- Gimnasia La Plata
1953–1960	Rangers	169	(0)
1961–1964	Universidad Católica		
- * Club domestic league appearances and goals

Walter Carlos Behrends Donovara (1929–2005) was an Argentine naturalized Chilean football goalkeeper.

== Career ==
Behrends played for clubs of Argentina and Chile. In Argentina, he played for Gimnasia La Plata between 1949 and 1952. In Chile, he played for Rangers and Universidad Católica. He was part of the 1961 Universidad Católica team that won the Primera División de Chile.

He coincided with Arturo Rodenak in both Gimnasia La Plata and Rangers de Talca, with whom he had another several similarities such as his height, his hometown, among others.

== Personal life ==
Behrends naturalized Chilean by residence in 1958.

He died on 21 January 2005.

== Titles ==
Season	Team	Title
1961	Universidad Católica	Primera División de Chile
