= Sergio Velasco =

Chilean footballer

Personal information
- Full name: Sergio del Carmen Velazco Beiza
- Date of birth: 20 May 1943 (age 83)
- Place of birth: Papudo, Chile
- Height: 1.68 m (5 ft 6 in)
- Position: Full-back

Youth career
- Miraflores

Senior career*
Years	Team	Apps	(Gls)
1962–1965	San Luis		
1966–1971	Rangers	194	(8)
1972	Antofagasta Portuario	32	(6)
1973	Fígaro La Paz		
1973–1975	San José		
1976	Deportes La Serena	21	(3)
1976	The Strongest		
1977	Jorge Wilstermann		
1977	ENAF Oruro		
1978	Trasandino		
- * Club domestic league appearances and goals

Sergio del Carmen Velazco Beiza (born 20 May 1943), sportingly known as Sergio Velasco, is a Chilean former football player who played as a full-back. A historical player of Rangers de Talca, he also played in Bolivia.

== Career ==
Born in Papudo, Chile, as a youth player, Velasco was with his hometown club, Miraflores before trialling with Unión La Calera and San Luis de Quillota. After trials in the presence of the coach René Quitral, he signed with San Luis and made his professional debut in a Chilean Primera División match against Everton in 1962.

In the Chilean top division, he spent four seasons with San Luis (1962–65), also facing English side Stoke City in a friendly in 1964, six seasons with Rangers (1966–71) and one season with both Antofagasta Portuario (1972) and Deportes La Serena (1976).

A historical player of Rangers, he was a noted member of the squad that was the 1969 Primera División runner-up, being selected as the best left-back of the season, and played the 1970 Copa Libertadores. He has been honored by fans associations like Soñadores Rojinegros (Red and Black Dreamers) as well as the club itself.

In the 1970s, he played in the Bolivian football. In 1973, he played for club Fígaro from La Paz for six months before joining San José. Back in Bolivia after a stint with Deportes La Serena in 1976, he played for The Strongest, Jorge Wilstermann and ENAF from Oruro.

Back in Chile, his last club was Trasandino in the 1978 season.

== Style of play ==
A versatile right-footed player, he played as an attacking right winger at youth level. He made his professional debut as a right-back, but the next match he switched to the left side, developing the most part of his career as a left-back. In the Bolivian football, he also played as a central midfielder.

== Personal life ==
He was nicknamed Mono (Monkey), a nickname that was given him by his fellow in Rangers, Iván Azócar.
