= Arturo Rodenak =

Argentine-born Chilean footballer (1931-2012)

Personal information
- Full name: Arturo Emilio Rodenak Karaba
- Date of birth: 14 April 1931
- Place of birth: La Plata, Argentina
- Date of death: 26 September 2012 (aged 81)
- Place of death: Talca, Chile
- Height: 1.85 m (6 ft 1 in)
- Position: Goalkeeper

Senior career*
Years	Team	Apps	(Gls)
1950–1954	Gimnasia LP	35	(0)
1955–1956	Tigre	0	(0)
1957–1963	Rangers	93	(0)
1963–1967	Audax Italiano	85	(0)
1968	Iberia	32	(0)
1969	San Antonio Unido	27	(0)
1970	Oriente Petrolero	31	(0)
1971	Petrolero Cochabamba	24	(0)
1972	San José	29	(0)
Total		356	(0)

International career
1951	Argentina U23	1	(0)

Managerial career
- 1978–1979: Rangers
- 1982: Rangers
- 1985–1986: Rangers
- 1988: Deportes Linares
- 1990–1991: Rangers
Medal record
Men's football
Representing Argentina
Pan American Games
Gold medal – first place	1951 Buenos Aires	Team
- * Club domestic league appearances and goals

Arturo Emilio Rodenak Karaba (Note: In this Spanish name, the first or paternal surname is Rodenak and the second or maternal family name is Karaba.) (13 April 1931 – 26 September 2012) was an Argentine naturalized Chilean footballer, regarded as one of the greatest players in Rangers’ history.

== Personal life ==
Rodenak naturalized Chilean by residence in 1962.

He coincided with Walter Behrends in both Gimnasia La Plata and Rangers de Talca, with whom he had another several similarities such as his height, his hometown, among others.

In 2009, he starred a short film called Palitroque (Breadstick) where he appeared drinking wine in the Estadio Fiscal de Talca and remembering his years as Rangers player as well as the origin of his nickname.

He died in Talca, Chile, aged 81.
