= Lautaro Rigazzi =

Argentine footballer

Personal information
- Full name: Lautaro Rigazzi Gaete
- Date of birth: 20 May 1998 (age 28)
- Place of birth: Mendoza, Argentina
- Height: 1.85 m (6 ft 1 in)
- Position: Defender

Team information
- Current team: Rangers
- Number: 16

Youth career
- Chacras
- Godoy Cruz

Senior career*
Years	Team	Apps	(Gls)
2019	Godoy Cruz	0	(0)
2019	Provincial Ovalle		
2020	Comunal Cabrero		
2020–2021	Provincial Ranco		
2021	San Antonio Unido	14	(0)
2022–2024	Deportes Concepción	66	(4)
2025	Santiago Morning	11	(0)
2026	Cumbayá	12	(0)
2026–	Rangers	0	(0)
- * Club domestic league appearances and goals as of 30 June 2026

Lautaro Rigazzi Gaete (born 20 May 1998) is an Argentine-Chilean footballer who plays as a defender for Chilean club Rangers de Talca.

== Career ==
Born in Mendoza, Argentina, Rigazzi was with local club Chacras before joining the Godoy Cruz youth ranks. In 2019, he moved to Chile to play for Provincial Ovalle. The next years, he played for Comunal Cabrero, Provincial Ranco and San Antonio Unido.

From 2022 to 2024, Rigazzi played for Deportes Concepción, winning the 2024 Segunda División Profesional de Chile. In 2025, he switched to Santiago Morning, suffering a serious injury that kept him out of activity during the second half of the year.

In March 2026, Rigazzi moved to Ecuador and joined Cumbayá. He moved back to Chile and joined Rangers de Talca for the second half of the year.

== Personal life ==
Rigazzi holds dual Argentine-Chilean nationality due to his mother's descent.
