= Rangers de Talca =

Chilean association football club

- Full name: Club Social de Deportes Rangers
- Nicknames: Los piducanos Los rojinegros El gigante del Maule
- Founded: November 2, 1902; 123 years ago
- Ground: Estadio Fiscal, Chile
- Capacity: 16 070
- Owner: Rojinegro SADP
- Chairman: Felipe Muñoz
- Manager: Erwin Durán
- League: Primera B
- 2025: Primera B, 7th of 16
- Website: www.rangersdetalca.com
Home colours	Away colours

Club Social de Deportes Rangers is a Chilean football club based in the city of Talca. The club was founded November 2, 1902 and plays in the second level of the Chilean football system. Their home games are played at the Fiscal stadium, which has a capacity of 16,000 seats.

== History ==
The club's name comes from Juan Greenstreet, a Scotsman, who had arrived in Chile a few years earlier to work on the farm of Doña Amalia Neale de Silva. Glasgow, and was accepted by the rest of the club's founding members despite initial reservations about it being a foreign name.

The origin of the chosen team colours, red and black, are unknown, though one of the possibilities was that some of the first players were also members of the Second Company of Firemen of Talca, whose shield was red and black. Another possible reason is the use of red and black in the socks of Rangers of Scotland (formed 1872) to represent the district colours of their local burgh of Govan. Fans of the Scottish club returned to using red and black scarves in 2012 to help raise funds for the club.

In 1952 was accepted into the Segunda División, and won the runners-up spot after finishing second in the league tournament final, getting the promotion to Primera División.

Rangers qualified for the Copa Libertadores in 1970, being its only participation in a CONMEBOL international tournament.

Throughout their first century of existence, honours have been few and far between, with no Championship successes.

Rangers was relegated in 2009 after being assessed a three-point penalty for using too many non-Chilean players in a November 8 match. The club filed a lawsuit in a Chilean court, leading to a threat from FIFA to throw out the Chile national team of the 2010 World Cup if the case continued. Under pressure from creditors, Rangers dropped the lawsuit on November 27, shortly after FIFA's demand. The case delayed the start of the league's playoffs.

In 2010, the club was auctioned and purchased by a business group called "Piduco SADP".

On November 27, 2011, Rangers was promoted to Primera División after beating Everton de Viña del Mar in the final match. Manager Dalcio Giovagnoli was fired in 2013, and replaced by Fernando Gamboa, who was considered mainly responsible of the team's relegation in 2014. Gamboa was fired too, but current manager Jorge Garcés wasn't able to avoid the side's relegation after two and a half years in the first division of Chilean football to the second division, the Primera B after finishing in the last place of both the Clausura and the accumulated table. The club's new owners confirmed Garcés will remain as the club's manager for the 2014–15 season, with the goal of gaining promotion to the first division. In October 2014, in a ceremony at the Talca Country Club, the marquess Luis Silva de Balboa transferred the trademark Rangers to the club. The trademark was his property until such time, and by a legal agreement, the transfer contains restrictions as to the limitation for the club to move out of the City of Talca of its ownership in hands other than people from Talca.

== Honours ==
=== National ===
- Primera B
  - Winners (3): 1988, 1993, Apertura 1997

=== Regional ===
- Torneo Provincial de Chile
  - Winners (1): 1969

== South American cups history ==
Season	Competition	Round	Country	Club	Home	Away	Aggregate
1970	Copa Libertadores	Group 3	(Paraguay)	Guaraní	0–1	0–2	6th Place
1970	Copa Libertadores	Group 3	(Paraguay)	Olimpia	4–4	1–5	6th Place
1970	Copa Libertadores	Group 3	(Colombia)	América de Cali	2–0	0–1	6th Place
1970	Copa Libertadores	Group 3	(Colombia)	Deportivo Cali	0–2	2–3	6th Place
1970	Copa Libertadores	Group 3	(Chile)	Universidad de Chile	1–7	1–2	6th Place

== Players ==
=== Current squad ===
Current squad of Rangers de Talca as of 3 August 2026 (edit)
Sources: ANFP Official Web Site

No.		Position	Player
1	CHI	GK	Martín Villalobos
2	CHI	DF	Carlos Labrín
3	CHI	DF	Kevin Vásquez
4	CHI	DF	José Navarrete
5	CHI	DF	Sebastián Silva
6	CHI	DF	Matías Cortés (loan from Deportes La Serena)
7	CHI	FW	Ignacio Ibáñez
8	CHI	MF	Alejandro Márquez (c)
9	URU	FW	Junior Arias
10	CHI	MF	Iván Rozas
11	CHI	FW	Manuel Vicuña
12	CHI	GK	Tomás Arenas
13	CHI	DF	Agustín Mora
14	CHI	DF	Sebastián Acuña
15	VEN	DF	Luis Rumbos
16	ARG	DF	Lautaro Rigazzi
17	ARG	GK	Cristian Campestrini
18	CHI	MF	Alonso Rodríguez
19	URU	FW	Damián González
20	CHI	MF	Gary Moya
21	CHI	FW	Pablo Mora

No.		Position	Player
22	CHI	MF	Diego Plaza (loan from Coquimbo Unido)
23	CHI	MF	Juan Méndez
24	CHI	MF	Tomás Gómez
25	CHI	GK	Fabián Cerda
26	CHI	FW	José Tomás Herrera
27	URU	DF	Claudio Servetti
28	CHI	MF	Martín Rosales
29	CHI	MF	Matías Donoso
30	CHI	DF	Darío Silva
31	CHI	FW	Cristóbal Muñoz (loan from Universidad de Chile)
34	CHI	DF	Renato Valenzuela
35	CHI	FW	Pablo Obrador
37	CHI	FW	Martín Castro (loan from O'Higgins)
38	CHI	MF	José Tomás Silva
39	CHI	FW	Ignacio Mesías (loan from Unión La Calera)
40	CHI	MF	Israel Reyes
41	CHI	DF	Maximiliano Villarroel
42	CHI	MF	Bastián Pérez
43	CHI	FW	Ricardo Concha
44	CHI	FW	Javier Hernández
–	CHI	GK	José Luis Gamonal

Manager: Ivo Basay

=== 2021 Winter transfers ===
==== In ====
Note: Flags indicate national team as defined under FIFA eligibility rules; some limited exceptions apply. Players may hold more than one non-FIFA nationality.

No.	Pos.	Nation	Player
11	MF	ARG	Ricardo Blanco (loan from Deportes Antofagasta)
20	FW	CHI	Mario Briceño (from Lautaro de Buin)

No.	Pos.	Nation	Player
32	FW	CHI	Juan Sebastián Ibarra (loan from Colo-Colo)

==== Out ====
Note: Flags indicate national team as defined under FIFA eligibility rules; some limited exceptions apply. Players may hold more than one non-FIFA nationality.

No.	Pos.	Nation	Player
11	FW	PLE	Yashir Islame (to Khon Kaen United)
18	MF	ECU	Andrés Mena (loan to Atlético Santo Domingo)

No.	Pos.	Nation	Player
20	MF	ARG	Marcos Fernández (released)

== Notable players ==
- (Argentina) (Chile) Walter Behrends
- (Argentina) (Chile) Vicente Cantatore
- (Argentina) (Chile) Atilio Herrera
- (Argentina) (Chile) Elvio Porcel de Peralta
- (Argentina) Germán Portanova
- (Argentina) (Chile) Arturo Rodenak
- (Argentina) Héctor Scandolli
- (Chile) Iván Azócar
- (Chile) Juan Cortés
- (Chile) Juan Soto
- (Chile) Sergio Velasco

== Managers ==
- (Chile) Nemesio Lora (1952)
- (Chile) Óscar Andrade (1952)
- (Chile) Charles Bown (1953)
- (Hungary) (Chile) Ladislao Pakozdi (1953–1955)
- (Argentina) José Luis Boffi (1956–1957)
- (Chile) Renato Panay (1957)
- (Hungary) José Klamar (1958)
- (Chile) Guillermo Báez (1959)
- (Chile) Sergio Sagredo (1959)
- (Chile) Renato Panay (1960)
- (Uruguay) Omar Cabral (1960–1961)
- (Argentina) José Dunivicher (1961)
- (Argentina) Donato Hernández (1962)
- (Uruguay) Adolfo Rodríguez (1963–1966)
- (Hungary) (Chile) Ladislao Pakozdi (1967)
- (Chile) Hernán Rodríguez (1967)
- (Chile) José Santos Arias (1968)
- (Chile) Óscar Andrade (1968–1971)
- (Chile) Sergio Cruzat (1971)
- (Chile) Hernán Gárate (1972)
- (Chile) Jorge Reyes (1972)
- (Argentina) (Italy) Miguel Montuori (1972)
- (Spain) Pedro Areso (1972–1974)
- (Chile) Constantino Mohor (1975)
- (Uruguay) Adolfo Rodríguez (1975–1976)
- (Uruguay) Eladio Benítez (1976)
- (Chile) Eugenio Jara (1976)
- (Chile) Jorge Venegas (1977)
- (Chile) Ramón Climent (1978)
- (Chile) Carlos Collado (1978)
- (Chile) Carlos Contreras (1978)
- (Argentina) (Chile) Arturo Rodenak (1978–1979)
- (Chile) Antonio Vargas (1980)
- (Chile) Sasha Mitjaew (1980)
- (Chile) Sergio Gutiérrez (1980)
- (Chile) Alfonso Sepúlveda (1981)
- (Chile) Germán Cornejo (1981)
- (Chile) Gastón Guevara (1982)
- (Argentina) (Chile) Arturo Rodenak (1982)
- (Chile) Orlando Aravena (1983)
- (Chile) Gustavo Cortés (1984)
- (Chile) Eugenio Jara (1984)
- (Chile) Antonio Vargas (1985)
- (Argentina) (Chile) Arturo Rodenak (1985–1986)
- (Chile) Armando Tobar (1986)
- (Chile) Sasha Mitjaew (1986)
- (Chile) José Lagos (1987)
- (Chile) Germán Cornejo (1987)
- (Chile) Hugo Solís (1988–1989)
- (Argentina) (Chile) Miguel Ángel Leyes (1989)
- (Chile) José Lagos (1989)
- (Uruguay) Jorge Luis Siviero (1990)
- (Chile) Patricio Gutiérrez (1990)
- (Argentina) (Chile) Arturo Rodenak (1990–1991)
- (Chile) Eduardo Prieto (1991)
- (Chile) Sergio Gutiérrez (1991)
- (Chile) Eugenio Jara (1991–1992)
- (Chile) Francisco Valdés (1992)
- (Chile) Hugo Solís (1993–1994)
- (Chile) Antonio Vargas (1994)
- (Chile) Patricio Gutiérrez (1994)
- (Chile) Guillermo Páez (1995)
- (Chile) Raúl Toro (1996–1999)
- (Chile) Eduardo Fournier (1999)
- (Chile) José Sulantay (1999)
- (Uruguay) Ángel Castelnoble (2000)
- (Chile) Juan Ubilla (2000–2001)
- (Chile) Óscar del Solar (2002–2003)
- (Chile) Daniel Salvador (2004)
- (Argentina) Gerardo Reinoso (2004)
- (Chile) Yuri Fernández (2005)
- (Uruguay) Ramón Castro (2006)
- (Argentina) Gerardo Reinoso (2006)
- (Chile) Juan Carlos Hernández (2007)
- (Chile) Óscar del Solar (2007–2008)
- (Chile) Juan Carlos Hernández (2008)
- (Chile) Juan Ubilla (2009)
- (Chile) Óscar del Solar (2009)
- (Chile) Rubén Vallejos (2010)
- (Argentina) (Chile) Fernando Cavalleri (2010)
- (Argentina) Roberto Mariani (2011)
- (Chile) Marcelo Peña (2011)
- (Argentina) Gabriel Perrone (2011–2012)
- (Argentina) Dalcio Giovagnoli (2012–2013)
- (Argentina) Fernando Gamboa (2013–2014)
- (Chile) Jorge Garcés (2014)
- (Chile) Claudio Salinas (2014)
- (Chile) Carlos Rojas (2014–2015)
- (Argentina) Héctor Almandoz (2015–2016)
- (Chile) Víctor Rivero (2016–2017)
- (Chile) Luis Guajardo (2017)
- (Chile) Héctor Tapia (2017)
- (Chile) Luis Guajardo (2017)
- (Chile) Juan José Ribera (2017)
- (Chile) Leonardo Zamora (2018)
- (Chile) Héctor Tapia (2018)
- (Argentina) Cristián Arán (2018–2019)
- (Chile) Héctor Tapia (2019)
- (Chile) Emiliano Astorga (2019)
- (Chile) Luis Marcoleta (2020–2021)
- (Chile) Ronald Fuentes (2021)
- (Chile) Felipe Cornejo (2022)
- (Chile) Eduardo Pinto (2022)
- (Argentina) Juan José Luvera (2022)
- (Argentina) Dalcio Giovagnoli (2023)
- (Argentina) Germán Cavalieri (2023)
- (Argentina) Juan José Luvera (2024)
- (Chile) Emiliano Astorga (2024)
- (Chile) Miguel Ponce (2025)
- (Chile) Erwin Durán (2025–2026)
- (Chile) Jaime Vera (2026)
- (Chile) Carlos Videla (2026)
- (Chile) Ivo Basay (2026–Present)

== Official sponsors ==
- Lotto
- Productos Fernández
