= Juan Méndez (footballer) =

Chilean footballer

Personal information
- Full name: Juan Enrique Méndez González
- Date of birth: 26 June 1996 (age 30)
- Place of birth: Hualpén, Chile
- Height: 1.76 m (5 ft 9 in)
- Position: Midfielder

Team information
- Current team: Rangers
- Number: 23

Youth career
- 2003–2009: El Triángulo
- 2009–2014: Huachipato

Senior career*
Years	Team	Apps	(Gls)
2014–2018	Huachipato	4	(0)
2017	→ Unión San Felipe (loan)	13	(0)
2018	→ Deportes La Serena (loan)	1	(0)
2018	Independiente Cauquenes	8	(0)
2019	Fernández Vial	16	(5)
2020–2021	Unión San Felipe	45	(6)
2022	Deportes Puerto Montt	30	(4)
2023	San Luis	27	(5)
2024	Curicó Unido	22	(1)
2025	Unión La Calera	23	(1)
2026–	Rangers	0	(0)

International career
2011	Chile U15		
- * Club domestic league appearances and goals as of 29 December 2025

Juan Enrique Méndez González (born 26 June 1996) is a Chilean footballer who plays as a midfielder for Rangers de Talca.

== Club career ==
Born in Hualpén, Chile, Méndez was with club El Triángulo before joining Huachipato, aged 13. He was promoted to the first team in 2014 and made his professional debut in the 5–4 win against Deportes Concepción for the 2014–15 Copa Chile. For the Chilean Primera División, he made his professional debut in the 2016 Torneo Apertura. He was loaned out to Unión San Felipe and Deportes La Serena in 2017 and 2018, respectively.

The next years, Méndez played for Independiente de Cauquenes, Fernández Vial, Unión San Felipe, Deportes Puerto Montt, San Luis de Quillota and Curicó Unido.

On 9 December 2024, Méndez signed with Unión La Calera in the Liga de Primera.

In December 2025, Méndez joined Rangers de Talca.

== International career ==
Méndez represented Chile at under-15 level in the 2011 South American Championship.
