= Miss Universe China 2020 =

- Date: December 9, 2020
- Presenters: Xue Yunfang
- Venue: Nanjing, Jiangsu, China
- Entrants: 18
- Placements: 10
- Winner: Jiaxin Sun; Beijing

Miss Universe China 2020 was the 16th edition of the Miss Universe China pageant, held in Nanjing, Jiangsu, China, on December 9, 2020. The pageant was originally supposed to take place on March 8, 2020; however due to COVID-19 pandemic, the pageant was cancelled and postponed to a later date.

Rosie Zhu Xin of Hebei crowned Jianxin Sun of Beijing as her successor at the end of the event. Jiaxin Sun represented China at Miss Universe 2020, held in the United States.

== Results ==
=== Placements ===
| Placement | Contestant |
|---|---|
| Miss Universe China 2020 | Beijing – Jiaxin Sun |
| 1st Runner-Up | Shanghai – Dan Wu |
| 2nd Runner-Up | Beijing – Yujia Chen |
| Top 5 | Guangdong – Xinyuan Li; Hong Kong – Lo Wong |
| Top 10 | Jilin – Flora Ge |

== Delegates ==
18 contestants competed for the title:

| Province/Region | Candidate | Chinese | Traditional Chinese | Age |
|---|---|---|---|---|
| Beijing | Jiaxin Sun | | | 21 |
| Beijing | Xiang Yan | 嚴翔燕 | 嚴翔燕 | |
| Chongqing | Qu Li | 屈莉 | 屈莉 | |
| Guangdong | Xinyuan Li | 李新元 | 李新元 | |
| Guizhou | Wu Shan | 吴珊 | 吳珊 | 21 |
| Hainan | Piao Piao | 飘飘 | 飘飘 | |
| Hebei | Li Ziyi | 李子怡 | 李子怡 | 18 |
| Heilongjiang | Lan Ruonan | 兰若男 | 蘭若男 | |
| Hong Kong | Lo Wong | 王羅 | 王羅 | 23 |
| Inner Mongolia | Sha Rinai | 沙日乃 | 沙日乃 | |
| Jiangsu | Song Jiachang | 宋佳昌 | 宋佳昌 | |
| Jiangxi | Wang Xinyu | 王心雨 | 王 | |
| Jilin | Flora Ge | 孟歌 | 孟歌 | |
| Liaoning | Jianfei Ren | 任建飛 | 任建飞 | |
| Overseas Chinese | Qichen Hu | 胡启辰 | 胡啟辰 | 20 |
| Shaanxi | Yuhe Huang | 黃宇和 | 黃宇和 | |
| Shanghai | Dan Wu | 吴丹 | 吳丹 | 28 |
| Shanxi | Yuhe Huang | 黄宇荷 | 黃宇荷 | |
