= Mary Telma Guajardo =

Mexican politician

- Born: 10 April 1959 (age 67); Cuatrociénegas, Coahuila, Mexico
- Occupation: Politician
- Political party: PRD

Mary Telma Guajardo Villar (born 10 April 1959) is a Mexican politician from the Party of the Democratic Revolution. From 2009 to 2012 she served as Deputy of the LXI Legislature of the Mexican Congress representing Coahuila.
