= Eduardo Pinto =

Chilean footballer (born 1976)

Personal information
- Full name: Eduardo Antonio Pinto Pinto
- Date of birth: 5 January 1976 (age 50)
- Place of birth: Talca, Chile
- Position: Midfielder

Youth career
- Rangers

Senior career*
| Years | Team | Apps | (Gls) |
| 1994–2001 | Rangers | 150 | (10) |
| 2002 | Coquimbo Unido | 29 | (1) |
| 2003 | Unión San Felipe | 27 | (1) |
| 2004–2009 | Rangers | 172 | (5) |
| 2010–2012 | Curicó Unido | 69 | (1) |
| Total | | 447 | (18) |

Managerial career
- 2012–2025: Rangers (youth)
- 2022: Rangers (interim)
- 2026–: Curicó Unido (youth)
- * Club domestic league appearances and goals

Eduardo Antonio Pinto Pinto (born January 5, 1976, in Talca, Chile) is a Chilean former footballer who played as a midfielder.

== Teams (Player) ==
- (Chile) Rangers 1994–2001
- (Chile) Coquimbo Unido 2002
- (Chile) Unión San Felipe 2003
- (Chile) Rangers 2004–2009
- (Chile) Curicó Unido 2010–2012

== Teams (Manager) ==
- (Chile) Rangers (youth) 2012–2025
- (Chile) Rangers (caretaker) 2022
- (Chile) Rangers (youth) 2026–

== Titles ==
- (Chile) Rangers 1997 (Torneo Apertura Primera B Championship)
