= Luis Guajardo =

Chilean footballer (born 1973)

Personal information
- Full name: Luis Francisco Guajardo Valderas
- Date of birth: 30 July 1973 (age 53)
- Place of birth: Punta Arenas, Chile
- Height: 1.76 m (5 ft 9 in)
- Position: Midfielder

Youth career
- Estrella del Sur
- Deportes Concepción

Senior career*
Years	Team	Apps	(Gls)
1993–1999	Deportes Concepción	174	(24)
1993	→ Deportes Laja (loan)	–	(–)
2000–2001	Colo-Colo	30	(3)
2002	Rangers	34	(3)
2003–2005	Deportes Concepción	101	(11)
2006–2007	Deportes Puerto Montt	71	(4)
2008	Santiago Wanderers	11	(0)
2008–2009	Deportes Concepción	28	(1)
Total		449	(46)

International career
1994	Chile U23 B		

Managerial career
- 2010–2011: Deportes Concepción (assistant)
- 2012–2013: Cobresal (assistant)
- 2014–2016: Deportes Concepción (youth)
- 2017: Rangers
- 2017–2019: Rangers (youth)
- 2019: Rangers (caretaker)
- 2021–2022: Deportes Concepción (assistant)
- 2023–: San Marcos (youth)
- 2023–2024: San Marcos (assistant)
- * Club domestic league appearances and goals

Luis Francisco Guajardo Valderas (born 30 July 1973) is a Chilean former footballer who played as a midfielder for Deportes Concepción, Colo-Colo, Rangers, Deportes Puerto Montt and Santiago Wanderers in Chile.

== Honours ==
=== Player ===
Deportes Concepción

- Segunda División de Chile: 1994
