= Jorge Guajardo =

Mexican diplomat

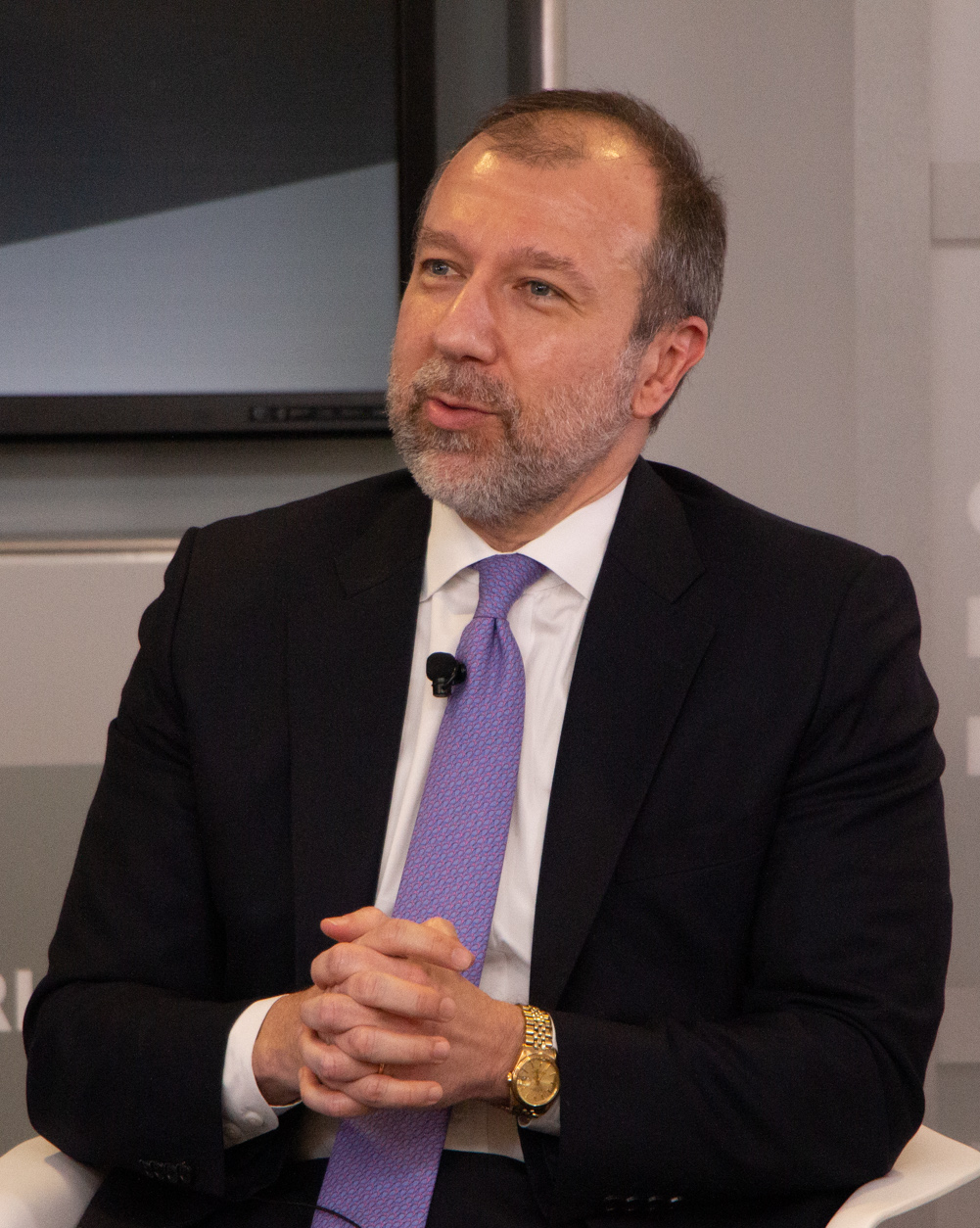
Jorge Guajardo

Jorge Eugenio Guajardo Gonzalez is a Mexican businessman and former diplomat from Nuevo León member of the National Action Party (Partido Acción Nacional, PAN). He is a partner at DGA Group.

Guajardo holds a bachelor degree in Foreign Service from Georgetown University and a master's in public policy from Harvard University's John F. Kennedy School of Government. From 1994 to 1997 he worked in the Washington, DC offices of Hill and Knowlton and later Burson-Marsteller. From 1997 to 2000 he served as communications director and press secretary for the Governor of Nuevo León.

In 2005, he was designated as the Mexican consul in Austin, Texas. In 2007 he was designated by President Felipe Calderón as the Mexican ambassador to the People's Republic of China; the Senate confirmed his designation in April 2007. Serving until 2013, he is the longest uninterrupted Mexican ambassador to the People's Republic of China. He was the first Mexican ambassador to China to visit all 22 provinces. In September 2013, Guajardo joined McLarty Associates as a senior director. In 2023, he became a partner at DGA Group.
