= 2018 Copa Chile =

Copa Chile MTS

Tournament details
- Country: Chile
- Teams: 48

Final positions
- Champions: Palestino (3rd title)
- Runners-up: Audax Italiano
- Copa Libertadores: Palestino

Tournament statistics
- Matches played: 94
- Goals scored: 246 (2.62 per match)
- Top goal scorer(s): Lucas Simón (6 goals)

The 2018 Copa Chile (officially known as Copa Chile MTS 2018 due to its sponsorship), was the 39th edition of the Copa Chile, the country's national football cup tournament. Santiago Wanderers were the defending champions, but lost to Palestino in the second round of the competition. Palestino went on to become champions after defeating Audax Italiano in the final by an aggregate score of 4–2.

== Format ==
The 2018 Copa Chile is based on a system of direct elimination with double-legged ties, similar to the Copa del Rey. As a novelty, after 6 years, clubs that are members of the Segunda División Profesional were included, and after 8 years, clubs of the ANFA were also included, such as these of Tercera División A and Tercera División B.

== Prizes ==
The champions of this edition (or the runners-up, if the champions had already qualified) earned the right to compete in the 2019 Copa Libertadores, taking the Chile 4 berth. Besides, they also earned the right to play the 2019 Supercopa de Chile. Unlike previous Copa Chile editions, the runners-up were not entitled to a berth to the Copa Sudamericana.

== Schedule ==
Round	Draw date	First leg	Second leg
First Round	16 April 2018	25–30 April 2018; 2–6 May 2018	2–16 May 2018
Second Round	18 May 2018	9–17 June 2018	14–21 June 2018
Round of 16	28 May 2018	22–24 June 2018	29 June – 2 July 2018
Quarterfinals	28 May 2018	7–8 July 2018	13–14 July 2018
Semifinals	28 May 2018	8 September 2018	13–14 October 2018
Finals	28 May 2018	10 November 2018	17 November 2018

== Teams ==
48 clubs took part in this edition of the Copa Chile: 16 from the Primera División, 16 from the Primera B, 10 from the Segunda División Profesional and 6 from the Tercera División A.

=== Primera A ===
- Audax Italiano
- Colo-Colo
- Curicó Unido
- Deportes Antofagasta
- Deportes Iquique
- Deportes Temuco
- Everton
- Huachipato
- O'Higgins
- Palestino
- San Luis
- Unión Española
- Unión La Calera
- Universidad Católica
- Universidad de Chile
- Universidad de Concepción

=== Primera B ===
- Barnechea
- Cobreloa
- Cobresal
- Coquimbo Unido
- Deportes Copiapó
- Deportes La Serena
- Deportes Melipilla
- Deportes Puerto Montt
- Deportes Valdivia
- Magallanes
- Ñublense
- Rangers
- San Marcos de Arica
- Santiago Morning
- Santiago Wanderers
- Unión San Felipe

=== Segunda División ===
- Colchagua
- Deportes Recoleta
- Deportes Santa Cruz
- Deportes Vallenar
- Fernández Vial
- General Velásquez
- Iberia
- Independiente (Cauquenes)
- Malleco Unido
- San Antonio Unido

=== Tercera A ===
- Deportes Limache
- Deportes Linares
- Lautaro de Buin
- Municipal Santiago
- Provincial Ovalle
- Tomás Greig

== Preliminary phases ==
=== First round ===
The pairings for the first round were announced by the ANFP on 16 April 2018. The 16 teams from the Segunda División and Tercera División A were drawn against the 16 Primera B teams, according to geographical and safety criteria. The first legs were played on 25, 28–30 April, 2 and 6 May and the second legs were played on 2–3, 5–6 and 16 May 2018.

Team 1	Agg.	Team 2	1st leg	2nd leg
Deportes Vallenar	1–3	San Marcos de Arica	0–2	1–1
Fernández Vial	0–4	Ñublense	0–2	0–2
Iberia	3–4	Rangers	1–3	2–1
Deportes Linares	2–3	Deportes Valdivia	2–1	0–2
Independiente (Cauquenes)	4–4 (3–1 p)	Santiago Morning	1–1	3–3
Tomás Greig	1–5	Magallanes	0–2	1–3
General Velásquez	2–1	Deportes Melipilla	0–0	2–1
Deportes Santa Cruz	0–5	Barnechea	0–1	0–4
Colchagua	2–2 (4–3 p)	Unión San Felipe	0–1	2–1
Lautaro de Buin	1–3	Deportes La Serena	1–0	0–3
Municipal Santiago	0–6	Santiago Wanderers	0–1	0–5
Deportes Recoleta	1–6	Coquimbo Unido	0–4	1–2
San Antonio Unido	2–4	Cobresal	2–0	0–4
Deportes Limache	3–3 (0–3 p)	Deportes Copiapó	2–2	1–1
Provincial Ovalle	1–7	Cobreloa	1–4	0–3
Malleco Unido	2–6	Deportes Puerto Montt	1–3	1–3

==== First leg ====
25 April 2018	Lautaro de Buin	1–0	Deportes La Serena	San Bernardo
17:00	Fuentes 29'	Report		Stadium: Estadio Municipal de San Bernardo; Attendance: 345; Referee: Patricio Blanca

25 April 2018	Municipal Santiago	0–1	Santiago Wanderers	La Pintana, Santiago
17:00		Report	López 89'	Stadium: Estadio Municipal de La Pintana; Attendance: 525; Referee: Claudio Aranda

25 April 2018	Deportes Linares	2–1	Deportes Valdivia	Linares
19:00	Rosas 32'; Parra 38'	Report	Ojeda 72'	Stadium: Estadio Fiscal; Attendance: 1,275; Referee: Claudio Cevasco

25 April 2018	Deportes Limache	2–2	Deportes Copiapó	Quillota
19:00	Beechey 47'; Ramírez 52'	Report	Estigarribia 10'; Ibáñez 25'	Stadium: Estadio Municipal Lucio Fariña; Attendance: 318; Referee: Matías Quila

25 April 2018	Tomás Greig	0–2	Magallanes	Rancagua
19:00		Report	Lopes 5'; Reyes 48'	Stadium: Estadio El Teniente; Attendance: 497; Referee: Nicolás Millas

28 April 2018	San Antonio Unido	2–0	Cobresal	El Quisco
16:30	Latorre 57'; García 63'	Report		Stadium: Estadio Municipal Eugenio Castro; Attendance: 703; Referee: Nicolás Gamboa

28 April 2018	Provincial Ovalle	1–4	Cobreloa	Ovalle
17:00	Ruiz 31'	Report	Romero 8', 62', 80'; Silva 53'	Stadium: Estadio Diaguita; Attendance: 3,453; Referee: Fernando Vejar

28 April 2018	Malleco Unido	1–3	Deportes Puerto Montt	Angol
18:00	Melo 17'	Report	O. Gutiérrez 31'; Droguett 42'; Grondona 65'	Stadium: Estadio Municipal Alberto Larraguibel; Attendance: 734; Referee: Manuel Vergara

28 April 2018	Deportes Vallenar	0–2	San Marcos de Arica	Vallenar
19:00		Report	Agüero 1'; Rojas 54'	Stadium: Estadio Municipal Nelson Rojas; Attendance: 1,594; Referee: Franco Arrué

28 April 2018	Iberia	1–3	Rangers	Los Ángeles
19:00	Aguilera 24'	Report	Torrealba 33'; Mancilla 54'; Pérez 87'	Stadium: Estadio Municipal; Attendance: 594; Referee: Benjamín Saravia

29 April 2018	Colchagua	0–1	Unión San Felipe	San Fernando
15:30		Report	Viveros 89'	Stadium: Estadio Municipal Jorge Silva; Attendance: 466; Referee: Omar Oporto

29 April 2018	General Velásquez	0–0	Deportes Melipilla	San Vicente
16:30		Report		Stadium: Estadio Municipal Augusto Rodríguez; Attendance: 817; Referee: Felipe Jara

29 April 2018	Fernández Vial	0–2	Ñublense	Concepción
16:30		Report	Silva 4', 45'	Stadium: Estadio Ester Roa; Attendance: 2,407; Referee: Cristián Droguett

30 April 2018	Deportes Recoleta	0–4	Coquimbo Unido	Quillota
18:00		Report	Rolón 1', 15', 35'; Huerta 47'	Stadium: Estadio Municipal Lucio Fariña; Attendance: 132; Referee: Miguel Araos

2 May 2018	Deportes Santa Cruz	0–1	Barnechea	Santa Cruz
19:00		Report	Oyarzo 47'	Stadium: Estadio Municipal Joaquín Muñoz; Attendance: 573; Referee: Eduardo Gamboa

6 May 2018	Independiente (Cauquenes)	1–1	Santiago Morning	Cauquenes
19:00	Canales 41'	Report	Rojas 90+1'	Stadium: Estadio Miguel Alarcón Osores; Attendance: 598; Referee: Fernando Vejar

==== Second leg ====
2 May 2018	Deportes Valdivia	2–0 (3–2 agg.)	Deportes Linares	Valdivia
19:00	Lanaro 33', 47'	Report		Stadium: Parque Municipal; Attendance: 581; Referee: Patricio Blanca

2 May 2018	Deportes Copiapó	1–1 (3–3 agg.) (3–0 p)	Deportes Limache	Copiapó
21:00	Munizaga 70'	Report	Cisterna 87'	Stadium: Estadio Luis Valenzuela Hermosilla; Attendance: 1,157; Referee: Gustavo Ahumada
	Penalties
	Ibáñez (penalty scored); Munizaga (penalty scored); Guzmán (penalty scored)		(penalty missed) Ramírez; (penalty missed) Cisterna; (penalty missed) Collao

3 May 2018	Cobreloa	3–0 (7–1 agg.)	Provincial Ovalle	Calama
20:00	Simón 66', 90+3'; Pérez 84'	Report		Stadium: Estadio Zorros del Desierto; Attendance: 1,998; Referee: Cristián Droguett

5 May 2018	Unión San Felipe	1–2 (2–2 agg.) (3–4 p)	Colchagua	San Felipe
15:30	Vega 39'	Report	Barrios 38'; Seida 52'	Stadium: Estadio Municipal; Attendance: 512; Referee: Rodrigo Carvajal
	Penalties
	Amarilla (penalty missed); B. Cortés (penalty scored); Viveros (penalty scored); Fernández (penalty scored); F. Cortés (penalty missed)		(penalty scored) Inostroza; (penalty missed) Araya; (penalty scored) Castillo; (penalty scored) Escobar; (penalty scored) Moya

5 May 2018	Deportes Melipilla	1–2 (1–2 agg.)	General Velásquez	Melipilla
16:30	Servín 28'	Report	Alegre 57', 60'	Stadium: Estadio Municipal Roberto Bravo; Attendance: 967; Referee: Nicolás Díaz

5 May 2018	Santiago Wanderers	5–0 (6–0 agg.)	Municipal Santiago	Valparaíso
17:00	E. Gutiérrez 3', 30'; Villalobos 48'; Viotti 68', 90+3'	Report		Stadium: Estadio Elías Figueroa Brander; Attendance: 4,380; Referee: Patricio Blanca

5 May 2018	Rangers	1–2 (4–3 agg.)	Iberia	Talca
17:30	Pavez 54'	Report	Pasmiño 18'; Urzúa 58'	Stadium: Estadio Fiscal; Attendance: 1,104; Referee: Nicolás Gamboa

5 May 2018	Deportes Puerto Montt	3–1 (6–2 agg.)	Malleco Unido	Puerto Montt
18:00	O. Gutiérrez 20'; Becica 49'; Guarino 71'	Report	Pinilla 41'	Stadium: Estadio Chinquihue; Attendance: 1,579; Referee: Víctor Abarzúa

6 May 2018	Barnechea	4–0 (5–0 agg.)	Deportes Santa Cruz	Puente Alto, Santiago
12:00	Nieto 59'; Jorquera 61'; Menéndez 65'; Henríquez 78'	Report		Stadium: Estadio Municipal; Attendance: 378; Referee: Gustavo Ahumada

6 May 2018	Magallanes	3–1 (5–1 agg.)	Tomás Greig	San Bernardo
12:00	Sosa 23'; Barroilhet 72'; Escobar 76'	Report	Bugueño 41'	Stadium: Estadio Municipal de San Bernardo; Attendance: 300; Referee: Matías Quila

6 May 2018	Ñublense	2–0 (4–0 agg.)	Fernández Vial	Chillán
15:30	Opazo 58'; Varas 88'	Report		Stadium: Estadio Nelson Oyarzún; Attendance: 2,389; Referee: Eduardo Gamboa

6 May 2018	Cobresal	4–0 (4–2 agg.)	San Antonio Unido	El Salvador
15:30	J. Gutiérrez 7'; Ross 67'; Maldonado 86'; Sepúlveda 90+1'	Report		Stadium: Estadio El Cobre; Attendance: 374; Referee: Benjamín Saravia

6 May 2018	San Marcos de Arica	1–1 (3–1 agg.)	Deportes Vallenar	Arica
17:00	Sánchez 19'	Report	Cuéllar 27'	Stadium: Estadio Carlos Dittborn; Attendance: 699; Referee: Fabián Aedo

6 May 2018	Coquimbo Unido	2–1 (6–1 agg.)	Deportes Recoleta	Coquimbo
17:00	Carvajal 7', 26'	Report	Lecaros 82'	Stadium: Estadio Francisco Sánchez Rumoroso; Attendance: 1,838; Referee: Felipe Jara

16 May 2018	Santiago Morning	3–3 (4–4 agg.) (1–3 p)	Independiente (Cauquenes)	La Pintana, Santiago
15:00	Ayala 17'; Rodríguez 42'; Cerón 68'	Report	Ortega 52'; Avello 78'; Benavídez 86'	Stadium: Estadio Municipal de La Pintana; Attendance: 186; Referee: Omar Oporto
	Penalties
	Reyes (penalty missed); Cerón (penalty scored); Ortega (penalty missed); Escalante (penalty missed)		(penalty scored) Torres; (penalty scored) Benavídez; (penalty scored) Escobar

16 May 2018	Deportes La Serena	3–0 (3–1 agg.)	Lautaro de Buin	La Serena
20:00	Cano 50'; Pol 53'; Segovia 75'	Report		Stadium: Estadio La Portada; Attendance: 1,277; Referee: Rodrigo Carvajal

=== Second round ===
In the second round, the 16 winning teams from the previous round were drawn against the 16 Primera División teams which entered the competition at this stage. As in the previous round, the pairings were based on geographical and safety criteria. In each tie, the team from the lower tier hosted the first leg. The pairings for the second round were announced by the ANFP on 18 May 2018, the first legs were played from 9 to 17 June 2018 and the second legs were played from 14 to 21 July 2018.

Team 1	Agg.	Team 2	1st leg	2nd leg
Independiente (Cauquenes)	0–5	Curicó Unido	0–4	0–1
Deportes Copiapó	3–2	Deportes Antofagasta	2–0	1–2
Deportes Valdivia	3–2	Deportes Temuco	2–1	1–1
Deportes La Serena	1–6	Universidad de Chile	1–4	0–2
Deportes Puerto Montt	3–1	Universidad de Concepción	1–0	2–1
Cobreloa	3–2	Universidad Católica	1–2	2–0
Coquimbo Unido	1–8	Audax Italiano	0–5	1–3
Cobresal	1–1 (5–4 p)	Everton	0–0	1–1
General Velásquez	2–5	Unión Española	1–1	1–4
Santiago Wanderers	3–6	Palestino	0–2	3–4
Colchagua	0–0 (6–5 p)	O'Higgins	0–0	0–0
Magallanes	1–2	Unión La Calera	1–1	0–1
San Marcos de Arica	5–4	Deportes Iquique	4–1	1–3
Ñublense	3–2	Colo-Colo	2–0	1–2
Rangers	1–4	Huachipato	1–2	0–2
Barnechea	2–1	San Luis	1–1	1–0

==== First leg ====
9 June 2018	Santiago Wanderers	0–2	Palestino	Valparaíso
12:30		Report	Vallejos 25'; Muñoz 30'	Stadium: Estadio Elías Figueroa Brander; Attendance: 2,667; Referee: Benjamín Saravia

9 June 2018	Ñublense	2–0	Colo-Colo	Chillán
15:00	Varas 56', 84'	Report		Stadium: Estadio Nelson Oyarzún; Attendance: 7,096; Referee: Cristián Garay

9 June 2018	Deportes Puerto Montt	1–0	Universidad de Concepción	Puerto Montt
18:00	Subiabre 15'	Report		Stadium: Estadio Chinquihue; Attendance: 2,583; Referee: Cristián Andaur

9 June 2018	Deportes Copiapó	2–0	Deportes Antofagasta	Copiapó
20:00	Salas 50'; Estigarribia 77'	Report		Stadium: Estadio Luis Valenzuela Hermosilla; Attendance: 1,951; Referee: Patricio Blanca

10 June 2018	Deportes La Serena	1–4	Universidad de Chile	La Serena
15:00	Pol 32'	Report	Leiva 23'; Beausejour 50'; Arancibia 71'; Soteldo 79'	Stadium: Estadio La Portada; Attendance: 7,623; Referee: José Cabero

10 June 2018	Deportes Valdivia	2–1	Deportes Temuco	Valdivia
15:30	Lanaro 47'; Pino 66'	Report	Ábalos 23'	Stadium: Parque Municipal; Attendance: 2,730; Referee: Cristián Droguett

10 June 2018	Cobresal	0–0	Everton	El Salvador
15:30		Report		Stadium: Estadio El Cobre; Attendance: 370; Referee: César Deischler

10 June 2018	General Velásquez	1–1	Unión Española	San Vicente
16:00	Espinoza 18'	Report	Carrera 4'	Stadium: Estadio Municipal Augusto Rodríguez; Attendance: 1,523; Referee: Franco Arrué

10 June 2018	San Marcos de Arica	4–1	Deportes Iquique	Arica
16:00	Vega 36'; Sánchez 45+1'; González 60'; Agüero 89'	Report	Torres 78'	Stadium: Estadio Carlos Dittborn; Attendance: 1,272; Referee: Felipe Jara

10 June 2018	Cobreloa	1–2	Universidad Católica	Calama
17:30	Romero 61'	Report	Llanos 19'; Aued 24' (pen.)	Stadium: Estadio Zorros del Desierto; Attendance: 4,293; Referee: Fabián Aracena

12 June 2018	Independiente (Cauquenes)	0–4	Curicó Unido	Cauquenes
15:30		Report	Zúñiga 23' (pen.); Pinto 49'; Díaz 57'; Pezoa 74'	Stadium: Estadio Miguel Alarcón Osores; Referee: Gustavo Ahumada
Note: The match was originally scheduled on 10 June at 15:30 but was postponed due to bad weather. It was rescheduled to 12 June at 15:30.

12 June 2018	Coquimbo Unido	0–5	Audax Italiano	Coquimbo
20:00		Report	Ledezma 33' (pen.), 60'; Tarifeño 54'; Campos 55'; Jeraldino 75'	Stadium: Estadio Francisco Sánchez Rumoroso; Attendance: 3,003; Referee: Felipe González

13 June 2018	Rangers	1–2	Huachipato	Talca
19:00	Céspedes 28'	Report	Parraguez 61', 71'	Stadium: Estadio Fiscal; Attendance: 708; Referee: Fernando Vejar
Note: The match was originally scheduled on 9 June at 17:30 but was postponed due to bad weather. It was rescheduled to 13 June at 19:00.

13 June 2018	Barnechea	1–1	San Luis	Lo Barnechea, Santiago
19:30	Bravo 10' (o.g.)	Report	Martínez 90'	Stadium: Estadio Municipal de Lo Barnechea; Attendance: 278; Referee: Ángelo Hermosilla

17 June 2018	Magallanes	1–1	Unión La Calera	San Bernardo
15:00	González 72'	Report	Jara 8'	Stadium: Estadio Municipal de San Bernardo; Attendance: 731; Referee: Felipe Jara

17 June 2018	Colchagua	0–0	O'Higgins	San Fernando
15:30		Report		Stadium: Estadio Municipal Jorge Silva; Attendance: 2,500; Referee: Fabián Aracena

==== Second leg ====
14 June 2018	Unión Española	4–1 (5–2 agg.)	General Velásquez	Independencia, Santiago
19:00	Dávila 12'; Aránguiz 45'; Jaime 68'; Muñoz 83' (pen.)	Report	Pérez 72'	Stadium: Estadio Santa Laura; Attendance: 1,611; Referee: Eduardo Gamboa

15 June 2018	Everton	1–1 (1–1 agg.) (4–5 p)	Cobresal	Viña del Mar
20:00	Sánchez 81'	Report	Rojas 88'	Stadium: Estadio Sausalito; Attendance: 2,067; Referee: Roberto Tobar
	Penalties
	Rodríguez (penalty scored); Suárez (penalty scored); Leiva (penalty missed); Orellana (penalty scored); Rubio (penalty scored); Madrid (penalty missed)		(penalty scored) Oyaneder; (penalty scored) Rojas; (penalty scored) Sandoval; (penalty scored) Mesías; (penalty missed) Sepúlveda; (penalty scored) González

16 June 2018	Palestino	4–3 (6–3 agg.)	Santiago Wanderers	La Pintana, Santiago
14:00	Cortés 20'; Campos López 43'; Fernández 59'; Tapia 80'	Report	Viotti 71'; Castro 79'; García 85'	Stadium: Estadio Municipal de La Pintana; Attendance: 698; Referee: César Deischler

16 June 2018	Deportes Temuco	1–1 (2–3 agg.)	Deportes Valdivia	Temuco
15:00	Arias 47'	Report	Lanaro 13'	Stadium: Estadio Germán Becker; Attendance: 3,123; Referee: Cristián Andaur

16 June 2018	Universidad de Concepción	1–2 (1–3 agg.)	Deportes Puerto Montt	Concepción
16:30	Manríquez 22'	Report	O. Gutiérrez 44'; Becica 71'	Stadium: Estadio Ester Roa; Attendance: 905; Referee: Felipe González

16 June 2018	Deportes Antofagasta	2–1 (2–3 agg.)	Deportes Copiapó	Antofagasta
17:00	Flores 86'; Romo 87'	Report	Tiznado 38'	Stadium: Estadio Regional Calvo y Bascuñán; Attendance: 1,244; Referee: Francisco Gilabert

16 June 2018	Universidad de Chile	2–0 (6–1 agg.)	Deportes La Serena	Ñuñoa, Santiago
19:00	Pinilla 68'; Lorenzetti 71'	Report		Stadium: Estadio Nacional; Attendance: 18,984; Referee: Cristián Garay

16 June 2018	Curicó Unido	1–0 (5–0 agg.)	Independiente (Cauquenes)	Curicó
19:00	Blanco 9'	Report		Stadium: Estadio La Granja; Attendance: 1,716; Referee: Rodrigo Carvajal

17 June 2018	Huachipato	2–0 (4–1 agg.)	Rangers	Talcahuano
12:00	Parraguez 14'; Huerta 75'	Report		Stadium: Estadio CAP; Attendance: 1,059; Referee: José Cabero

17 June 2018	Deportes Iquique	3–1 (4–5 agg.)	San Marcos de Arica	Iquique
12:00	Salinas 13'; Becerra 81'; Cubillos 90+2'	Report	Vega 82'	Stadium: Estadio Cavancha; Attendance: 1,716; Referee: Cristián Droguett

17 June 2018	Universidad Católica	0–2 (2–3 agg.)	Cobreloa	Las Condes, Santiago
16:15		Report	Parra 13'; Simón 40'	Stadium: Estadio San Carlos de Apoquindo; Attendance: 5,303; Referee: Ángelo Hermosilla

17 June 2018	San Luis	0–1 (1–2 agg.)	Barnechea	Quillota
17:00		Report	Orellana 90+2'	Stadium: Estadio Municipal Lucio Fariña; Attendance: 1,134; Referee: Christian Rojas

17 June 2018	Audax Italiano	3–1 (8–1 agg.)	Coquimbo Unido	La Florida, Santiago
19:00	Ledezma 12', 57'; Jeraldino 53'	Report	Delgado 84'	Stadium: Estadio Bicentenario de La Florida; Attendance: 917; Referee: Eduardo Gamboa

20 June 2018	O'Higgins	0–0 (0–0 agg.) (5–6 p)	Colchagua	Rancagua
18:30		Report		Stadium: Estadio El Teniente; Attendance: 2,244; Referee: Ángelo Hermosilla
	Penalties
	Calandria (penalty scored); Oroz (penalty scored); Alarcón (penalty scored); Sepúlveda (penalty scored); Vera (penalty scored); Márquez (penalty missed)		(penalty scored) Báez; (penalty scored) Inostroza; (penalty scored) Rojas; (penalty scored) Escobar; (penalty scored) Moya; (penalty scored) Barrios

20 June 2018	Unión La Calera	1–0 (2–1 agg.)	Magallanes	Quillota
20:00	Barbieri 57' (pen.)	Report		Stadium: Estadio Municipal Lucio Fariña; Attendance: 1,726; Referee: Franco Arrué

21 June 2018	Colo-Colo	2–1 (2–3 agg.)	Ñublense	Macul, Santiago
20:00	Fierro 13'; Opazo 90+1'	Report	Bustamante 90+9'	Stadium: Estadio Monumental; Attendance: 12,492; Referee: Eduardo Gamboa

== Bracket ==
Round of 16
12	Unión La Calera	1	0	1
10	Palestino	1	2	3
14	Ñublense	0	0	0
8	Cobresal	3	1	4
13	San Marcos de Arica	0	0	0
6	Cobreloa	6	1	7
11	Colchagua	1	0	1
4	Universidad de Chile	2	4	6
16	Barnechea (p)	1	1	2 (3)
1	Curicó Unido	0	2	2 (0)
5	Deportes Puerto Montt	0	3	3
3	Deportes Valdivia	4	0	4
15	Huachipato	2	1	3
2	Deportes Copiapó	1	1	2
9	Unión Española	0	0	0
7	Audax Italiano	2	1	3

Quarterfinals
10	Palestino	1	1	2
8	Cobresal	1	0	1
6	Cobreloa	1	2	3
4	Universidad de Chile	2	3	5
16	Barnechea (p)	1	1	2 (5)
3	Deportes Valdivia	0	2	2 (4)
15	Huachipato	1	1	2
7	Audax Italiano	2	2	4

Semifinals
10	Palestino	1	2	3
4	Universidad de Chile	1	0	1
16	Barnechea	1	0	1
7	Audax Italiano	1	1	2

Finals
10	Palestino	1	3	4
7	Audax Italiano	0	2	2

== Final phases ==
=== Round of 16 ===
The draw for the Round of 16 and subsequent phases was held on 28 May 2018. Starting from this round, the order of legs in each tie will depend on the number assigned to the second round tie won by each team, with the team with the highest number in each tie hosting the second leg. The first legs were played from 22 to 24 June 2018 and the second legs were played from 29 June to 2 July 2018.

Team 1	Agg.	Team 2	1st leg	2nd leg
Palestino	3–1	Unión La Calera	1–1	2–0
Cobresal	4–0	Ñublense	3–0	1–0
Cobreloa	7–0	San Marcos de Arica	6–0	1–0
Universidad de Chile	6–1	Colchagua	2–1	4–0
Deportes Valdivia	4–3	Deportes Puerto Montt	4–0	0–3
Curicó Unido	2–2 (0–3 p)	Barnechea	0–1	2–1
Audax Italiano	3–0	Unión Española	2–0	1–0
Deportes Copiapó	2–3	Huachipato	1–2	1–1

==== First leg ====
22 June 2018	Curicó Unido	0–1	Barnechea	Curicó
20:00		Report	Jorquera 56'	Stadium: Estadio La Granja; Attendance: 1,405; Referee: Felipe González

23 June 2018	Cobreloa	6–0	San Marcos de Arica	Calama
16:30	Luna 8'; M. Parra 31'; Romero 47'; Simón 49'; P. Parra 54', 61'	Report		Stadium: Estadio Zorros del Desierto; Attendance: 1,896; Referee: Cristián Droguett

23 June 2018	Audax Italiano	2–0	Unión Española	La Florida, Santiago
19:00	Bosso 33'; Santos 88'	Report		Stadium: Estadio Bicentenario de La Florida; Attendance: 1,448; Referee: Christian Rojas

23 June 2018	Deportes Copiapó	1–2	Huachipato	Copiapó
20:00	Jara 72'	Report	Sepúlveda 12'; Bareiro 33'	Stadium: Estadio Luis Valenzuela Hermosilla; Attendance: 2,852; Referee: Nicolás Gamboa

24 June 2018	Palestino	1–1	Unión La Calera	La Pintana, Santiago
12:00	Muñoz 30'	Report	Contreras 55'	Stadium: Estadio Municipal de La Pintana; Attendance: 704; Referee: Cristián Andaur

24 June 2018	Cobresal	3–0	Ñublense	El Salvador
15:30	Oyaneder 15'; Sandoval 20'; Gaete 39'	Report		Stadium: Estadio El Cobre; Attendance: 344; Referee: Ángelo Hermosilla

24 June 2018	Deportes Valdivia	4–0	Deportes Puerto Montt	Valdivia
16:30	Aquino 43' (o.g.); Poncet 49'; Castillo 72'; Lanaro 86'	Report		Stadium: Parque Municipal; Attendance: 2,634; Referee: Felipe Jara

24 June 2018	Universidad de Chile	2–1	Colchagua	Ñuñoa, Santiago
19:00	Pinilla 38' (pen.); Guerra 80'	Report	Catalán 65'	Stadium: Estadio Nacional; Attendance: 15,260; Referee: Francisco Gilabert

==== Second leg ====
29 June 2018	Barnechea	1–2 (2–2 agg.) (3–0 p)	Curicó Unido	Lo Barnechea, Santiago
20:00	Urquieta 18'	Report	Pinto 19'; Vargas 54'	Stadium: Estadio Municipal de Lo Barnechea; Attendance: 705; Referee: Cristián Garay
	Penalties
	Orellana (penalty scored); Henríquez (penalty scored); Nieto (penalty scored)		(penalty missed) Zúñiga; (penalty missed) Blanco; (penalty missed) Vargas

30 June 2018	Unión Española	0–1 (0–3 agg.)	Audax Italiano	Independencia, Santiago
12:00		Report	Santos 75'	Stadium: Estadio Santa Laura; Attendance: 900; Referee: Franco Arrué

30 June 2018	Colchagua	0–4 (1–6 agg.)	Universidad de Chile	Rancagua
16:30		Report	Díaz 21' (pen.), 74'; Leiva 82'; Benegas 87'	Stadium: Estadio El Teniente; Attendance: 6,667; Referee: César Deischler

30 June 2018	Deportes Puerto Montt	3–0 (3–4 agg.)	Deportes Valdivia	Puerto Montt
18:00	Delgado 17'; Becica 38'; Grondona 69'	Report		Stadium: Estadio Chinquihue; Attendance: 1,779; Referee: Cristián Droguett

30 June 2018	Unión La Calera	0–2 (1–3 agg.)	Palestino	Quillota
19:00		Report	Muñoz 17'; Lizana 86'	Stadium: Estadio Municipal Lucio Fariña; Attendance: 1,571; Referee: Eduardo Gamboa

1 July 2018	Ñublense	0–1 (0–4 agg.)	Cobresal	Chillán
15:30		Report	Sandoval 66'	Stadium: Estadio Nelson Oyarzún; Attendance: 2,036; Referee: Benjamín Saravia

1 July 2018	San Marcos de Arica	0–1 (0–7 agg.)	Cobreloa	Arica
16:00		Report	Simón 51'	Stadium: Estadio Carlos Dittborn; Attendance: 588; Referee: Patricio Blanca

2 July 2018	Huachipato	1–1 (3–2 agg.)	Deportes Copiapó	Talcahuano
12:30	Bizama 43'	Report	Castillo 45+3'	Stadium: Estadio CAP; Attendance: 1,071; Referee: Carlos Ulloa

=== Quarterfinals ===
The first legs were played on 7 and 8 July 2018, while the second legs were played on 13 and 14 July 2018.

Team 1	Agg.	Team 2	1st leg	2nd leg
Cobresal	1–2	Palestino	1–1	0–1
Universidad de Chile	5–3	Cobreloa	2–1	3–2
Deportes Valdivia	2–2 (4–5 p)	Barnechea	0–1	2–1
Audax Italiano	4–2	Huachipato	2–1	2–1

==== First leg ====
7 July 2018	Universidad de Chile	2–1	Cobreloa	Ñuñoa, Santiago
17:30	Araos 25', 76'	Report	Simón 65'	Stadium: Estadio Nacional; Attendance: 18,770; Referee: Ángelo Hermosilla

8 July 2018	Deportes Valdivia	0–1	Barnechea	Valdivia
12:30		Report	Oyarzo 62'	Stadium: Parque Municipal; Attendance: 2,146; Referee: Felipe Jara

8 July 2018	Cobresal	1–1	Palestino	El Salvador
15:30	Maldonado 15'	Report	Muñoz 22' (pen.)	Stadium: Estadio El Cobre; Referee: Nicolás Gamboa

8 July 2018	Audax Italiano	2–1	Huachipato	La Florida, Santiago
18:00	Torres 18'; Ledezma 45'	Report	Martínez 39'	Stadium: Estadio Bicentenario de La Florida; Attendance: 1,328; Referee: Roberto Tobar

==== Second leg ====
13 July 2018	Barnechea	1–2 (2–2 agg.) (5–4 p)	Deportes Valdivia	Lo Barnechea, Santiago
20:00	Oyarzo 48'	Report	Lanaro 60'; Rencoret 78' (o.g.)	Stadium: Estadio Municipal de Lo Barnechea; Attendance: 1,018; Referee: Carlos Ulloa
	Penalties
	Orellana (penalty missed); Henríquez (penalty scored); Rencoret (penalty missed); Oyarzo (penalty scored); Meneses (penalty scored); Riveros (penalty scored); Muñoz (penalty scored)		(penalty missed) Olivera; (penalty scored) Lanaro; (penalty scored) Wiemberg; (penalty scored) Opazo; (penalty missed) C. González; (penalty scored) V. González; (penalty missed) Pino

14 July 2018	Huachipato	1–2 (2–4 agg.)	Audax Italiano	Talcahuano
12:30	Parraguez 51'	Report	Jeraldino 52'; Santos 90+1'	Stadium: Estadio CAP; Attendance: 1,314; Referee: Felipe González

14 July 2018	Cobreloa	2–3 (3–5 agg.)	Universidad de Chile	Calama
15:30	Sanhueza 69'; Fernández 80'	Report	Benegas 47'; Díaz 63'; Araos 90+4'	Stadium: Estadio Zorros del Desierto; Attendance: 8,714; Referee: Eduardo Gamboa

14 July 2018	Palestino	1–0 (2–1 agg.)	Cobresal	La Pintana, Santiago
18:00	Benítez 47'	Report		Stadium: Estadio Municipal de La Pintana; Attendance: 1,114; Referee: Cristián Garay

=== Semifinals ===
The first legs were played on 8 September 2018, and the second legs were played on 12 and 13 October 2018.

Team 1	Agg.	Team 2	1st leg	2nd leg
Universidad de Chile	1–3	Palestino	1–1	0–2
Audax Italiano	2–1	Barnechea	1–1	1–0

==== First leg ====
8 September 2018	Universidad de Chile	1–1	Palestino	Ñuñoa, Santiago
17:30	Soteldo 52'	Report	J. Fernández 36'	Stadium: Estadio Nacional; Attendance: 22,292; Referee: Christian Rojas

8 September 2018	Audax Italiano	1–1	Barnechea	La Florida, Santiago
20:00	Santos 35'	Report	Hernández 27'	Stadium: Estadio Bicentenario de La Florida; Attendance: 1,959; Referee: Carlos Ulloa

==== Second leg ====
12 October 2018	Barnechea	0–1 (1–2 agg.)	Audax Italiano	Lo Barnechea, Santiago
20:00		Report	Tarifeño 78'	Stadium: Estadio Municipal de Lo Barnechea; Attendance: 1,509; Referee: Piero Maza

13 October 2018	Palestino	2–0 (3–1 agg.)	Universidad de Chile	La Cisterna, Santiago
15:00	J. Fernández 26'; R. Gutiérrez 46'	Report		Stadium: Estadio Municipal de La Cisterna; Attendance: 4,633; Referee: Julio Bascuñán

=== Finals ===
For the first time since 2011, the finals were played in a two-legged tie format.

10 November 2018
20:00
1st Leg

Audax Italiano	0–1	Palestino
	Report	Vallejos 90+2'

Estadio Bicentenario, La Florida, Santiago
Attendance: 6,528
Referee: Ángelo Hermosilla

17 November 2018
17:00
2nd Leg

Palestino	3–2	Audax Italiano
Campos López 3'; Cortés 37'; Jiménez 54'	Report	Santos 42'; Jeraldino 45'

Estadio Municipal, La Cisterna, Santiago
Attendance: 5,436
Referee: Eduardo Gamboa

Palestino won 4–2 on aggregate.

== Top goal scorers ==
Rank	Name	Club	Goals
1	(Argentina) Lucas Simón	Cobreloa	6
2	(Chile) Sebastián Romero	Cobreloa	5
2	(Brazil) Sergio Santos	Audax Italiano	5
2	(Argentina) Gustavo Lanaro	Deportes Valdivia	5
2	(Chile) Iván Ledezma	Audax Italiano	5

Source: ANFP
