= 2017 Campeonato Nacional Primera B =

Primera B de Chile
- Season: 2017
- Champions: Unión La Calera (3rd title)
- Promoted: Unión La Calera
- Relegated: Iberia
- Matches: 120
- Goals: 314 (2.62 per match)
- Top goalscorer: Sebastián Abreu; Lucas Simón (11 goals each)

The 2017 Primera B de Chile, known as the 2017 Campeonato de Transición Loto for sponsorship purposes, was the 64th season of Chile's second-tier football league. The competition began on 29 July 2017.

== Teams ==
=== Stadia and locations ===
Locations of 2017 Primera B de Chile teams

| Club | City | Stadium | Capacity |
|---|---|---|---|
| Barnechea | Lo Barnechea | Municipal de Lo Barnechea | 3,000 |
| Cobreloa | Calama | Zorros del Desierto | 12,346 |
| Cobresal | El Salvador | El Cobre | 12,000 |
| Coquimbo Unido | Coquimbo | Municipal Francisco Sánchez Rumoroso | 18,750 |
| Deportes Copiapó | Copiapó | La Caldera^{a} | 3,000 |
| Deportes La Serena | La Serena | La Portada | 18,243 |
| Deportes Puerto Montt | Puerto Montt | Chinquihue | 10,000 |
| Deportes Valdivia | Valdivia | Parque Municipal | 5,397 |
| Iberia | Los Ángeles | Municipal de Los Ángeles | 4,150 |
| Magallanes | San Bernardo | Municipal de San Bernardo | 3,500 |
| Ñublense | Chillán | Municipal Nelson Oyarzún Arenas | 12,000 |
| Rangers | Talca | Fiscal de Talca | 8,200 |
| San Marcos de Arica | Arica | Carlos Dittborn | 9,746 |
| Santiago Morning | La Pintana | Municipal de La Pintana | 6,000 |
| Unión La Calera | La Calera | Lucio Fariña Fernández^{b} | 7,680 |
| Unión San Felipe | San Felipe | Municipal de San Felipe | 12,000 |

a: Deportes Copiapó temporarily plays its home games at Estadio La Caldera in Caldera due to remodeling works at Estadio Luis Valenzuela Hermosilla.
b: Unión La Calera temporarily plays its home games at Estadio Municipal Lucio Fariña Fernández in Quillota due to remodeling works at Estadio Municipal Nicolás Chahuán Nazar.

== Standings ==
| Pos | Team | Pld | W | D | L | GF | GA | GD | Pts | Qualification |
|---|---|---|---|---|---|---|---|---|---|---|
| 1 | Unión La Calera (C) | 15 | 10 | 4 | 1 | 25 | 11 | +14 | 34 | Qualification to Promotion playoff |
| 2 | Deportes Copiapó | 15 | 8 | 2 | 5 | 24 | 18 | +6 | 26 | |
| 3 | Cobreloa | 15 | 7 | 2 | 6 | 30 | 28 | +2 | 23 | |
| 4 | Coquimbo Unido | 15 | 6 | 4 | 5 | 18 | 16 | +2 | 22 | |
| 5 | Barnechea | 15 | 6 | 4 | 5 | 26 | 25 | +1 | 22 | |
| 6 | Magallanes | 15 | 6 | 3 | 6 | 18 | 19 | −1 | 21 | |
| 7 | Deportes Puerto Montt | 15 | 6 | 3 | 6 | 18 | 20 | −2 | 21 | |
| 8 | Cobresal | 15 | 6 | 2 | 7 | 23 | 20 | +3 | 20 | |
| 9 | Unión San Felipe | 15 | 4 | 8 | 3 | 14 | 14 | 0 | 20 | |
| 10 | San Marcos de Arica | 15 | 5 | 5 | 5 | 20 | 21 | −1 | 20 | Qualification to Promotion playoff (Note: San Marcos de Arica qualified for the Promotion playoff by finishing as runners-up in the 2016–17 Primera B.) |
| 11 | Deportes La Serena | 15 | 5 | 4 | 6 | 20 | 20 | 0 | 19 | |
| 12 | Ñublense | 15 | 4 | 6 | 5 | 11 | 13 | −2 | 18 | |
| 13 | Iberia | 15 | 5 | 3 | 7 | 25 | 28 | −3 | 18 | |
| 14 | Santiago Morning | 15 | 4 | 5 | 6 | 17 | 23 | −6 | 17 | |
| 15 | Deportes Valdivia | 15 | 4 | 3 | 8 | 11 | 17 | −6 | 15 | |
| 16 | Rangers | 15 | 3 | 4 | 8 | 14 | 21 | −7 | 13 | |

Source: ANFP, Soccerway
Rules for classification: 1) Points, 2) Goal difference, 3) Matches won, 4) Goals for, 5) Away goals for, 6) Red cards, 7) Yellow cards, 8) Drawing of lots.
In case there are two teams tied in points for first place: 2) Playoff game.
(C) Champions

== Results ==
| Home \ Away | BAR | COB | CSL | COQ | CDC | DLS | DPM | VAL | IBE | MAG | ÑUB | RAN | SMA | SM | ULC | USF |
|---|---|---|---|---|---|---|---|---|---|---|---|---|---|---|---|---|
| Barnechea | — | 4–2 | — | — | 1–3 | 3–1 | — | 2–0 | — | — | 1–1 | 4–2 | — | — | — | 3–3 |
| Cobreloa | — | — | — | — | 3–2 | 4–0 | 2–0 | — | 4–2 | 1–2 | — | — | 3–3 | 4–3 | — | — |
| Cobresal | 2–3 | 2–4 | — | — | — | 2–1 | — | 2–1 | 3–0 | — | 5–0 | — | — | — | 1–1 | — |
| Coquimbo Unido | 1–0 | 1–0 | 1–0 | — | — | — | 1–2 | — | — | — | 1–0 | 1–1 | — | 4–0 | — | — |
| Deportes Copiapó | — | — | 2–1 | 2–0 | — | — | 2–1 | — | — | 3–0 | — | 1–0 | 0–0 | 1–0 | — | 1–2 |
| Deportes La Serena | — | — | — | 2–1 | 3–1 | — | — | 1–2 | 3–1 | 3–1 | — | — | 3–0 | — | 0–1 | 0–1 |
| Deportes Puerto Montt | 2–2 | — | 1–0 | — | — | 1–1 | — | 1–2 | 2–4 | — | — | 2–0 | 1–0 | 3–2 | — | — |
| Deportes Valdivia | — | 0–0 | — | 0–0 | 0–2 | — | — | — | — | 0–1 | 0–1 | — | — | — | 1–1 | 1–0 |
| Iberia | 0–1 | — | — | 1–2 | 3–2 | — | — | 3–1 | — | 2–3 | 1–0 | — | 1–1 | — | — | 1–2 |
| Magallanes | 3–0 | — | 1–2 | 2–0 | — | — | 1–2 | — | — | — | 0–0 | — | 2–1 | — | 0–1 | — |
| Ñublense | — | 3–0 | — | — | 0–0 | 1–1 | 2–0 | — | — | — | — | 1–0 | — | 1–1 | 0–1 | — |
| Rangers | — | 3–2 | 2–0 | — | — | 1–1 | — | 1–0 | 1–3 | 1–1 | — | — | — | — | — | 1–1 |
| San Marcos de Arica | 3–1 | — | 3–0 | 2–1 | — | — | — | 2–1 | — | — | 1–1 | 1–0 | — | — | 1–3 | 0–0 |
| Santiago Morning | 1–1 | — | 0–3 | — | — | 0–0 | — | 0–2 | 0–0 | 2–0 | — | 2–1 | 4–2 | — | — | — |
| Unión La Calera | 1–0 | 3–0 | — | 2–2 | 4–2 | — | 1–0 | — | 3–3 | — | — | 1–0 | — | 0–1 | — | — |
| Unión San Felipe | — | 0–1 | 0–0 | 2–2 | — | — | 0–0 | — | — | 1–1 | 1–0 | — | — | 1–1 | 0–2 | — |

Source: ANFP, Soccerway
Legend: Blue = home team win; Yellow = draw; Red = away team win.

== Top goalscorers ==
| Rank | Name | Club | Goals |
|---|---|---|---|
| 1 | (Uruguay) Sebastián Abreu | Deportes Puerto Montt | 11 |
| 1 | (Argentina) Lucas Simón | Cobreloa | 11 |
| 3 | (Chile) Matías Campos López | San Marcos de Arica | 10 |
| 4 | (Argentina) David Escalante | Santiago Morning | 8 |
| 4 | (Argentina) Rafael Viotti | Unión La Calera | 8 |
| 6 | (Chile) Mauricio Gómez | Iberia | 7 |
| 6 | (Chile) Francisco Ibáñez | Deportes Copiapó | 7 |
| 8 | (France) Richard Barroilhet | Barnechea | 6 |
| 8 | (Paraguay) Ever Cantero | Cobresal | 6 |

Source: Soccerway

== Promotion playoff ==
The promotion playoff was played by three teams: Santiago Wanderers, as the last-placed in the Primera División relegation table, 2016–17 Primera B runners-up San Marcos de Arica, and 2017 Primera B champions Unión La Calera. The two Primera B teams played each other with the winner qualifying to the final against the Primera División team for promotion to the top flight for the 2018 season.

Semifinal
Santiago Wanderers | — | — | —
Bye | — | — | —
Unión La Calera | 0 | 2 | 2
San Marcos de Arica | 1 | 0 | 1

Final
Santiago Wanderers | 1 | 0 | 1 (4)
Unión La Calera (p) | 0 | 1 | 1 (5)

== Relegation ==
Relegation was determined at the end of the season by computing an average of the number of points earned per game over the two most recent seasons: 2016–17 and 2017. The team with the lowest average was relegated to the Segunda División Profesional.

| Pos | Team | 2016–17 Pts | 2017 Pts | Total Pts | Total Pld | Avg | Relegation |
|---|---|---|---|---|---|---|---|
| 1 | San Marcos de Arica | 50 | 20 | 70 | 43 | 1.628 | |
| 2 | Coquimbo Unido | 43 | 22 | 65 | 43 | 1.512 | |
| 3 | Cobreloa | 41 | 23 | 64 | 43 | 1.488 | |
| 4 | Barnechea | — | 22 | 22 | 15 | 1.467 | |
| 5 | Deportes La Serena | 40 | 19 | 59 | 43 | 1.372 | |
| 6 | Santiago Morning | 42 | 17 | 59 | 43 | 1.372 | |
| 7 | Deportes Copiapó | 32 | 26 | 58 | 43 | 1.349 | |
| 8 | Cobresal | — | 20 | 20 | 15 | 1.333 | |
| 9 | Magallanes | 36 | 21 | 57 | 43 | 1.326 | |
| 10 | Rangers | 40 | 13 | 53 | 43 | 1.233 | |
| 11 | Unión San Felipe | 32 | 20 | 53 | 43 | 1.233 | |
| 12 | Deportes Puerto Montt | 31 | 21 | 52 | 43 | 1.209 | |
| 13 | Unión La Calera | 18 | 34 | 52 | 43 | 1.209 | |
| 14 | Ñublense | 29 | 18 | 47 | 43 | 1.093 | |
| 15 | Deportes Valdivia | 32 | 15 | 47 | 43 | 1.093 | |
| 16 | Iberia (R) | 28 | 18 | 46 | 43 | 1.07 | Relegation to Segunda División |

== See also ==
- 2017 Chilean Primera División
