= Matías Campos =

Matías Campos may refer to:

- Matías Campos Toro (born 1989), Chilean football left-back
- Matías Campos López (born 1991), Chilean football forward for Everton

== See also ==
- Matias del Campo, Chilean architect
