= Cristian Aravena =

Chilean footballer (born 1998)

Personal information
- Full name: Cristian Alejandro Aravena Viveros
- Date of birth: 7 March 1998 (age 28)
- Place of birth: Santiago, Chile
- Height: 1.75 m (5 ft 9 in)
- Position: Forward

Youth career
- Unión Española
- Santiago Morning

Senior career*
Years	Team	Apps	(Gls)
2017–2021	Santiago Morning	71	(7)
2022–2023	Coquimbo Unido	16	(2)
2024	San Luis	16	(0)
2025	Santiago City	10	(0)
- * Club domestic league appearances and goals as of 24 March 2026

Cristian Alejandro Aravena Viveros (born 7 March 1998) is a Chilean professional footballer who plays as a forward.

== Career ==
Mainly a left winger, as a child, Aravena was with Unión Española, then he moved to Santiago Morning and made his professional debut in the 1–0 loss against Deportes Copiapó for the 2017 Primera B de Chile in 9 September. For the club, he made 71 appearances and scored 7 goals until the 2021 season.

For the 2022 season, he moved to Coquimbo Unido in the Chilean Primera División. For the club, he scored his first goal in the derby versus Deportes La Serena in 23 July, what also was his first match as a starting player.

In 2024, he joined San Luis de Quillota.

== Personal life ==
Aravena is usually nicknamed Misil (Missile).
