= Ricardo Blanco =

Ricardo Blanco may refer to:

- Ricardo Blanco Herrera (born 1954), Chilean jurist, justice of the Supreme Court
- Ricardo Blanco (Costa Rican footballer) (born 1989), Costa Rican football left-back
- Ricardo Blanco (Argentine footballer) (born 1990), Argentine football forward
