= Bibencio Servín =

Paraguayan footballer (born 1984)

Personal information
- Full name: Bibencio Servín Paredes
- Date of birth: 2 November 1984 (age 42)
- Place of birth: Chaco, Paraguay
- Height: 1.72 m (5 ft 8 in)
- Position: Forward

Youth career
- River Plate Asunción

Senior career*
Years	Team	Apps	(Gls)
2005–2007	Pilcomayo	–	(–)
2008	Curicó Unido	25	(5)
2009–2010	2 de Mayo	7	(1)
2011	Lota Schwager	19	(3)
2012	San Luis	14	(4)
2012	Curicó Unido	17	(5)
2013–2015	Barnechea	25	(7)
2014	→ Santiago Morning (loan)	16	(2)
2015	Curicó Unido	9	(2)
2015–2016	Deportes Puerto Montt	12	(6)
2016–2017	Cobreloa	6	(0)
2017	Independiente Cauquenes	0	(0)
2017–2018	Deportes Melipilla	18	(5)
2019	Fernández Vial	18	(4)
Total		186	(44)
- * Club domestic league appearances and goals

Bibencio Servín Paredes (born 2 November 1984), known as Bibencio Servín, is a former Paraguayan naturalized Chilean footballer.

== Career ==
As a youth player, Servín was with River Plate de Asunción. He started his senior career with Pilcomayo in his homeland.

In 2008, he emigrated to Chile and joined Curicó Unido in the Primera B de Chile, winning the league title. He developed almost all his career in that country, except in 2009–10 when he played for 2 de Mayo in Paraguay.

In Chile, he also played for Lota Schwager, San Luis, Barnechea, Santiago Morning, Deportes Puerto Montt, Cobreloa, Independiente de Cauquenes, Deportes Melipilla and Fernández Vial, his last club.

Servín was a key part of A.C. Barnechea's 2013–14 Primera B side that won the club's first promotion to the Primera División de Chile. He scored the deciding goal in the semi-final of the playoffs against Santiago Morning, and helped the club win the final on penalties.

== Personal life ==
Servín naturalized Chilean by residence.

== Post-retirement ==
Servín started a career in football coaching with amateur youth teams. In December 2023, he won the amateur youth championship of the Maule Region with the Romeral city team.

== Honors ==
Curicó Unido

- Primera B de Chile (1): 2008
