= Diego Vallejos =

Chilean footballer (born 1990)

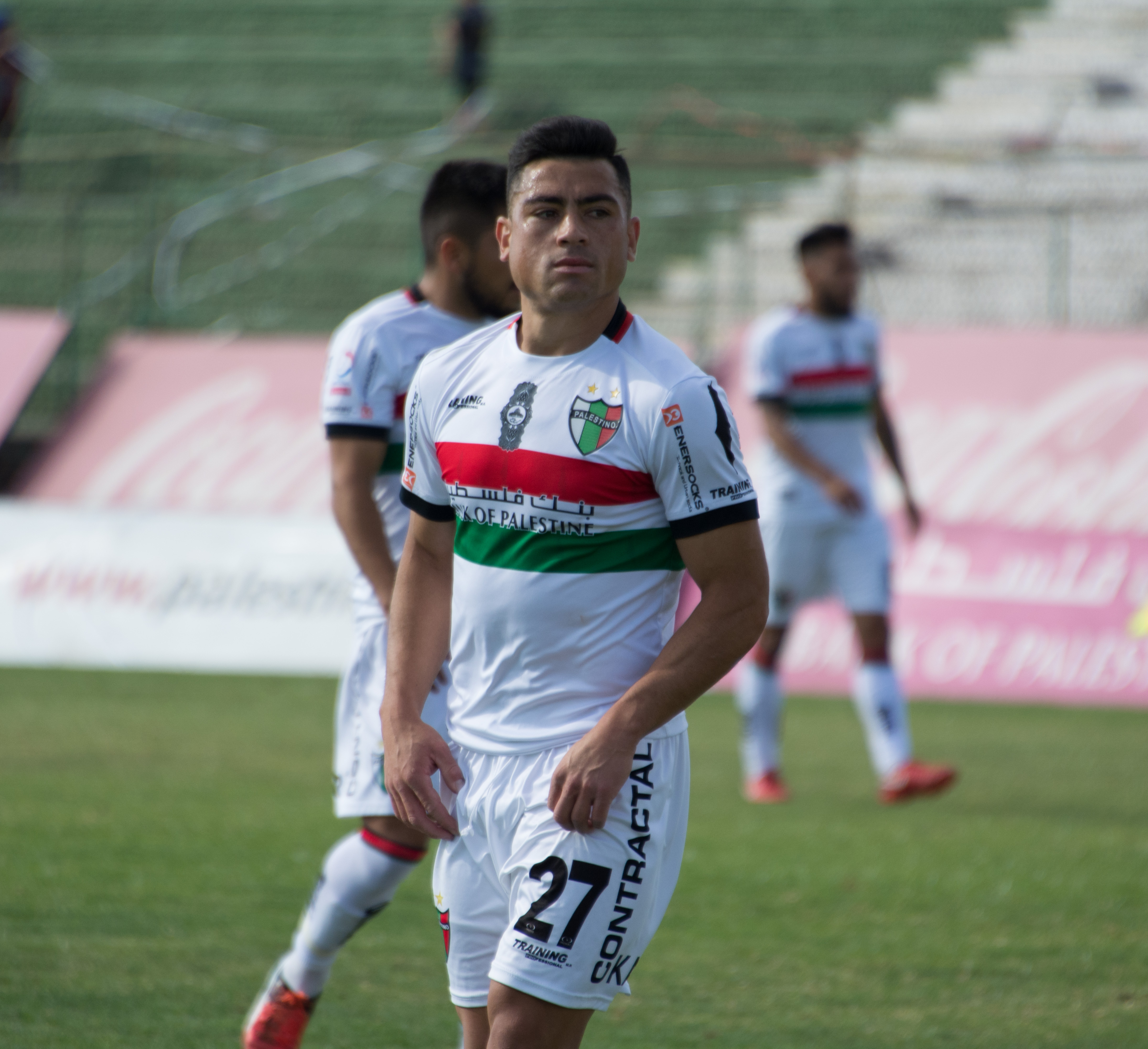
- Vallejos with Palestino in 2018

Personal information
- Full name: Diego Alfredo Vallejos Hernández
- Date of birth: 16 March 1990 (age 36)
- Place of birth: Colbún, Chile
- Height: 1.73 m (5 ft 8 in)
- Position: Forward

Team information
- Current team: Deportes Linares

Youth career
- Deportes Linares

Senior career*
Years	Team	Apps	(Gls)
2009–2012	Deportes Linares	117	(78)
2013–2017	Audax Italiano	104	(21)
2013–2014	Audax Italiano B	19	(11)
2017–2020	Universidad Católica	6	(0)
2018	→ Palestino (loan)	13	(1)
2019	→ Curicó Unido (loan)	7	(0)
2020	→ Coquimbo Unido (loan)	19	(1)
2021	Coquimbo Unido	7	(1)
2021	Santiago Wanderers	15	(1)
2022	Independiente Cauquenes	19	(7)
2023–2025	Deportes Linares	58	(13)
2026	Comunal Cabrero	1	(0)
2026–	Deportes Linares	0	(0)
- * Club domestic league appearances and goals as of 18 March 2026

Diego Alfredo Vallejos Hernández (born 16 March 1990) is a Chilean professional footballer who plays as a forward for Deportes Linares.

== Career ==
Vallejos is a product of Deportes Linares. In 2023, he returned to them in the Segunda División Profesional de Chile. In March 2026, he joined Comunal Cabrero with views to the promotion playoff for the 2026 Segunda División Profesional against Lota Schwager. After this match, he rejoined Deportes Linares for the 2026 season.

== Honours ==
Palestino

- Copa Chile: 2018
