= Iván Sandoval (Chilean footballer) =

Chilean footballer (born 1995)

Personal information
- Full name: Iván Ignacio Sandoval Pizarro
- Date of birth: 22 April 1995 (age 31)
- Place of birth: Santiago, Chile
- Height: 1.81 m (5 ft 11 1/2 in)
- Position: Forward

Youth career
- 2009–2014: Cobresal

Senior career*
Years	Team	Apps	(Gls)
2014–2018	Cobresal	52	(8)
2019	San Luis	12	(2)
2020–2021	Deportes Vallenar	22	(6)
2021	Iberia	20	(2)
2023	Fernández Vial	15	(0)
2024	Lautaro de Buin	4	(0)
- * Club domestic league appearances and goals

Iván Ignacio Sandoval Pizarro (born 22 April 1995) is a Chilean former footballer who played as a forward.

== Career ==
Sandoval started off with Cobresal, joining their academy in 2009. He made his first appearances for the club during 2014, featuring in four out of six of Cobresal's Copa Chile group stage encounters as they advanced as runners-up. Sandoval made his professional league debut on 22 February 2015 during a Chilean Primera División fixture with Santiago Wanderers, he was substituted on in the second half at 0–0 with Cobresal eventually winning 1–0. In the 2016–17 campaign, Sandoval scored four goals; notably scoring a brace against Huachipato in April 2016. They ended 2016–17 with relegation to Primera B de Chile.

== Post-retirement ==
Retired in 2024, Sandoval has worked in food delivery and waste collection.

== Career statistics ==
As of 9 October 2018.

Club statistics
Club	Season	League			Cup (Note: Includes the Copa Chile)		League Cup		Continental (Note: Includes the Copa Libertadores and Copa Sudamericana)		Other		Total	
Club	Season	Division	Apps	Goals	Apps	Goals	Apps	Goals	Apps	Goals	Apps	Goals	Apps	Goals
Cobresal	2013–14	Primera División	0	0	1	0	—		—		0	0	1	0
Cobresal	2014–15	Primera División	2	0	3	0	—		0	0	0	0	5	0
Cobresal	2015–16	Primera División	6	4	0	0	—		2 (Note: Two appearances in the 2016 Copa Libertadores)	0	0	0	8	4
Cobresal	2016–17	Primera División	21	2	0	0	—		—		0	0	21	2
Cobresal	2017	Primera B	9	1	0	0	—		—		0	0	9	1
Cobresal	2018	Primera B	14	1	7	2	—		—		0	0	20	3
Career total			52	8	11	2	—		2	0	0	0	65	10
