= Diego Orellana =

Chilean footballer (born 1993)

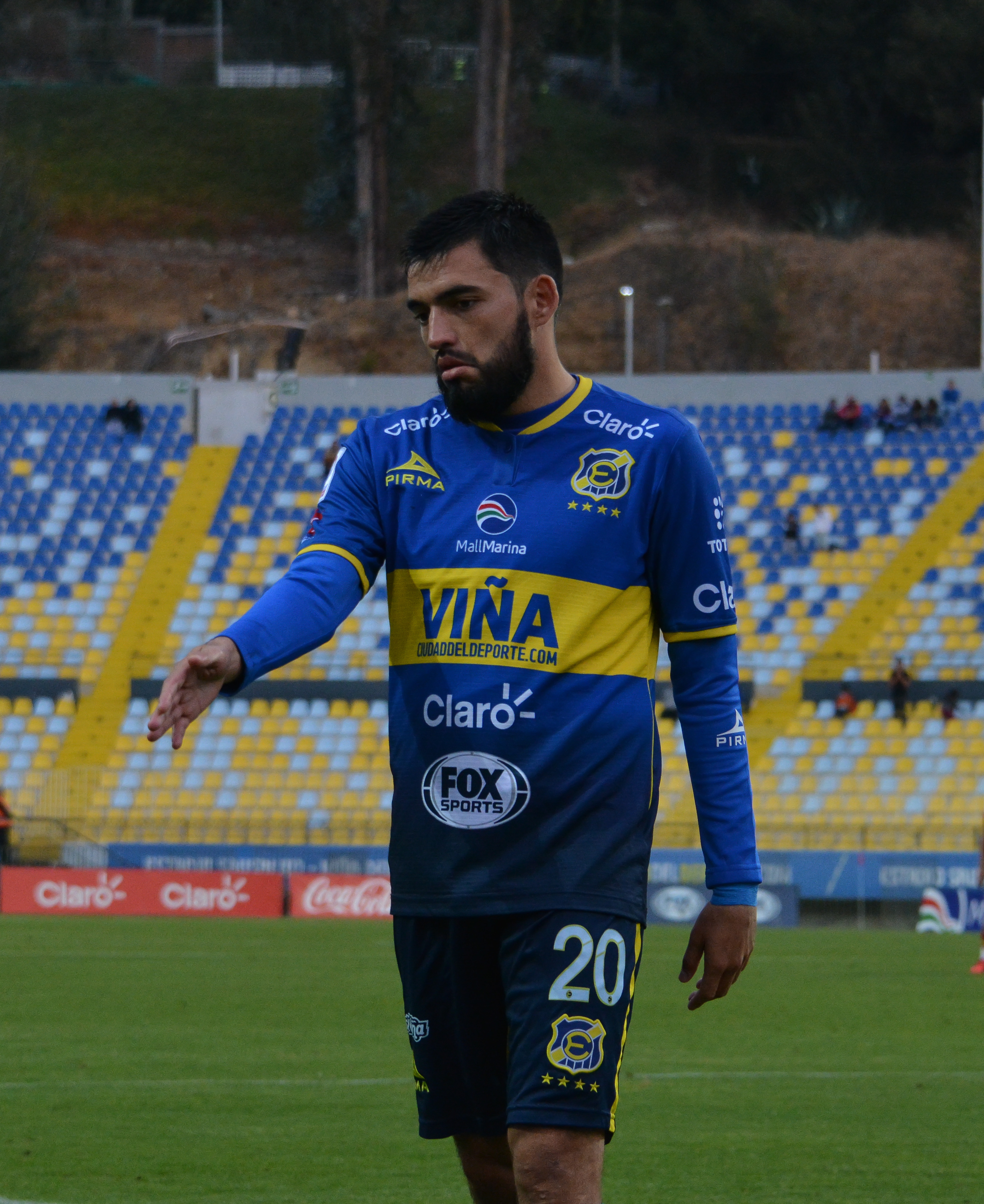

Personal information
- Full name: Diego Felipe Andrés Orellana Medina
- Date of birth: 16 May 1993 (age 33)
- Place of birth: San Vicente de Tagua Tagua, Chile
- Position: Midfielder

Team information
- Current team: Deportes Antofagasta
- Number: 20

Senior career*
Years	Team	Apps	(Gls)
2010–2019	Everton	88	(4)
2013–2014	→ Deportes Puerto Montt (loan)	15	(1)
2017–2018	→ Unión La Calera (loan)	14	(1)
2020–2021	Deportes Iquique	31	(2)
2021–	Deportes Antofagasta	0	(0)
- * Club domestic league appearances and goals as of 14 February 2021

Diego Felipe Andrés Orellana Medina (born 16 May 1993) is a Chilean footballer who plays for Deportes Antofagasta.

== Honours ==
Everton

- Primera B: 2015–16

Union La Calera

- Primera B: 2017
