= Nino Rojas =

Chilean footballer

Personal information
- Full name: Nino Flavio Rojas Sagal
- Date of birth: 4 April 1987 (age 39)
- Place of birth: Talca, Chile
- Height: 1.90 m (6 ft 3 in)
- Position: Forward

Youth career
- Rangers

Senior career*
Years	Team	Apps	(Gls)
2005–2006	Rangers	5	(1)
2007	Linares Unido	–	(–)
2007–2008	Colchagua	–	(–)
2009	Lota Schwager	5	(1)
2009	Deportes Temuco	–	(–)
2009	Curicó Unido	2	(0)
2010	Iberia	–	(–)
2011	Unión La Calera	13	(0)
2012	Deportes Copiapó	22	(7)
2013–2014	Deportes Puerto Montt	16	(9)
2014–2015	Deportes Concepción	28	(6)
2015–2016	Cobreloa	15	(4)
2016–2017	Rangers	10	(1)
2017	Alajuelense	7	(1)
2017	Rangers	13	(2)
2018	San Marcos	26	(4)
2019	Santiago Morning	17	(2)
2020–2021	Independiente Cauquenes	4	(0)
Total		183	(38)
- * Club domestic league appearances and goals

Nino Flavio Rojas Sagal (born 4 April 1987) is a Chilean former professional footballer who played as a forward for clubs in Chile and Costa Rica.

== Career ==
A product of Rangers de Talca youth system, Rojas had an extensive career in his homeland. He made appearances in the Chilean top division for Rangers, Curicó Unido and Unión La Calera. He also played for well-known clubs such as Deportes Temuco, Deportes Concepción, Cobreloa, Santiago Morning, among others.

In 2017, he had a stint with Alajuelense in the Costa Rican top division, where he came recommended by the former Chile international footballer Iván Zamorano since the coach was Benito Floro who had coached Zamorano in Real Madrid.

His last club was Independiente de Cauquenes.

== Personal life ==
Rojas is nicknamed El Portaviones del Maule (The Aircraft Carrier from Maule) due to his strong build.

Rojas is the cousin of the Chile international footballer Ángelo Sagal and his younger brother Bastián, and the son of Bernardino "Loco Nino" Rojas, a well-known footballer in his city of birth, Talca.
