= Franco Ortega =

Chilean footballer

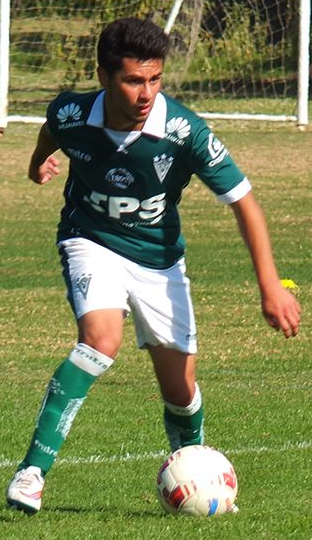
- Ortega with Santiago Wanderers in 2015

Personal information
- Full name: Franco Sebastián Ortega Venegas
- Date of birth: 25 June 1996 (age 30)
- Place of birth: Villa Alemana, Chile
- Height: 1.72 m (5 ft 8 in)
- Position: Left wing-back

Team information
- Current team: Deportes Temuco
- Number: 17

Youth career
- Santiago Wanderers

Senior career*
Years	Team	Apps	(Gls)
2012–2021	Santiago Wanderers	4	(0)
2018	→ Independiente Cauquenes (loan)	26	(2)
2019	→ Fernández Vial (loan)	24	(6)
2020–2021	→ San Luis (loan)	21	(2)
2021–2024	Deportes Melipilla	71	(2)
2021	→ Deportes Puerto Montt (loan)	11	(1)
2025	Magallanes	28	(0)
2026–	Deportes Temuco	0	(0)

International career
2013	Chile U17		
- * Club domestic league appearances and goals as of 24 December 2025

Franco Sebastián Ortega Venegas (25 June 1996) is a Chilean footballer who plays as a left wing-back for Deportes Temuco.

== Club career ==
A product of Santiago Wanderers, Ortega made his professional debut in the 0–2 away win against San Marcos de Arica on 15 January 2016 for the Chilean Primera División. From 2018 to 2021, he was subsequently loaned out to Independiente de Cauquenes, Fernández Vial and San Luis de Quillota.

In February 2021, Ortega joined Deportes Melipilla in the Primera División. In the second half of the same year, he was loaned out to Deportes Puerto Montt. Back to Deportes Melipilla in 2022, he spent three seasons with them, becoming the runners-up in the 2024 Segunda División Profesional.

In 2025, Ortega played for Magallanes. He switched to Deportes Temuco for the 2026 season.

== International career ==
Ortega represented Chile at under-17 level in the 2013 South American Championship.
