= Marcos Benavídez =

Argentine footballer

Personal information
- Full name: Marcos Brian Benavídez
- Date of birth: 26 March 1993 (age 33)
- Place of birth: San Luis, Argentina
- Height: 1.93 m (6 ft 4 in)
- Position: Forward

Senior career*
Years	Team	Apps	(Gls)
2012–2014	Luján	16	(0)
2015	Atlas	16	(1)
2016	Dptes. Concepción	5	(2)
2017–2018	Ind. Cauquenes	16	(9)
2019	Santa Cruz	6	(1)
- * Club domestic league appearances and goals as of 7 April 2020

Marcos Brian Benavídez (born 26 March 1993) is an Argentine footballer who last played as a forward for Deportes Santa Cruz.
