= Eric Pino =

Chilean footballer (born 1986)

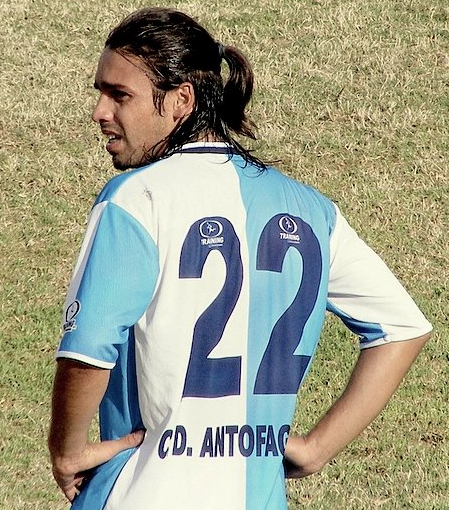
- Pino with Deportes Antofagasta in 2008

Personal information
- Full name: Eric Cristóbal Pino Caro
- Date of birth: 15 April 1986 (age 40)
- Place of birth: Valdivia, Chile
- Height: 1.65 m (5 ft 5 in)
- Position: Attacking midfielder

Youth career
- Universidad de Chile

Senior career*
Years	Team	Apps	(Gls)
2005–2007	Universidad de Chile	29	(1)
2007	→ Cobreloa (loan)	20	(0)
2008–2012	Deportes Antofagasta	99	(19)
2009	→ Rangers (loan)	13	(2)
2012	Boa Esporte	1	(0)
2012–2014	Deportes Antofagasta	39	(3)
2014–2015	Deportes La Serena	34	(6)
2016	Miami United	–	(–)
2016–2020	Deportes Valdivia	76	(8)
2017	→ Palestino (loan)	15	(0)
2020–2021	Santiago Morning	35	(0)
2022	Deportes Limache	10	(0)
2023	General Velásquez	10	(0)
Total		381	(39)
- * Club domestic league appearances and goals

Eric Cristóbal Pino Caro (born 15 April 1986) is a Chilean former footballer who played as a midfielder.

== Career ==
Pino joined Brazilian club Boa Esporte on 2 February 2012.

In 2016, Pino signed with Miami United in the NPSL, returning to Chile to join Deportes Valdivia in the same year.

For the 2023, Pino signed with General Velásquez, his last club.
