= Matías Sánchez (footballer, born 1990) =

Chilean footballer

Personal information
- Full name: Matías Alberto Sánchez Herrera
- Date of birth: 8 May 1990 (age 36)
- Place of birth: Copiapó, Chile
- Height: 1.78 m (5 ft 10 in)
- Position: Forward

Youth career
- Deportes Copiapó

Senior career*
| Years | Team | Apps | (Gls) |
| 2006–2008 | Deportes Copiapó | 27 | (1) |
| 2009–2011 | Unión La Calera | 10 | (0) |
| 2012–2014 | Deportes Copiapó | 64 | (24) |
| 2014–2015 | Huachipato | 11 | (0) |
| 2015–2016 | Deportes Concepción | 29 | (4) |
| 2016–2017 | Deportes Copiapó | 24 | (1) |
| 2017 | Arameisk-Syrianska IF | 7 | (4) |
| 2018 | San Marcos | 14 | (1) |
| 2019–2021 | Deportes Copiapó | 14 | (2) |
| 2021 | Colchagua | 8 | (2) |
| Total | | 208 | (39) |
- * Club domestic league appearances and goals

Matías Alberto Sánchez Herrera (born 8 May 1990) is a Chilean former footballer who played as a forward.

== Career ==
Sánchez's first team was Deportes Copiapó of Primera B de Chile and made his professional debut at the age of 16. He played twenty-seven times and scored one goal in 2008, prior to joining fellow Primera B side Unión La Calera in 2009. He remained with the club for three seasons and played ten times, including twice in the 2011 Primera Division season following promotion in 2010. Sánchez returned to Deportes Copiapó, now in the Segunda División, in 2012. In the third tier, he scored fifteen goals in twenty-five matches as Copiapó won promotion. Sánchez had spells with Huachipato and Concepción between 2014 and 2016; playing forty times, scoring four goals.

Sánchez returned to Deportes Copiapó for a third time in June 2016. A year later, Sánchez left Chilean football for the first time to sign for Swedish Division 1 Norra side Arameisk-Syrianska IF. He departed at the end of 2017 after four goals, including two in a 5–3 win over Umeå FC, in seven matches. In January 2018, Sánchez returned to Chile to join San Marcos. His 200th appearance came on 17 February in a 2–5 loss to ex-club Deportes Copiapó. In 2019, Sánchez rejoined Deportes Copiapó for a fourth stint.

He retired at the end of the 2021 season, aged 31.

== Post-retirement ==
Sánchez switched to work in the mining industry.

== Career statistics ==
As of 23 August 2019.

Club statistics
| Club | Season | League | | | Cup | | Continental | | Other | | Total | |
| Club | Season | Division | Apps | Goals | Apps | Goals | Apps | Goals | Apps | Goals | Apps | Goals |
|---|---|---|---|---|---|---|---|---|---|---|---|---|
| Deportes Copiapó | 2008 | Primera B | 27 | 1 | 0 | 0 | — | | 0 | 0 | 27 | 1 |
| Unión La Calera | 2009 | Primera B | 7 | 0 | 0 | 0 | — | | 0 | 0 | 7 | 0 |
| Unión La Calera | 2010 | Primera B | 1 | 0 | 1 | 0 | — | | 0 | 0 | 2 | 0 |
| Unión La Calera | 2011 | Primera División | 2 | 0 | 2 | 1 | — | | 0 | 0 | 4 | 1 |
| Unión La Calera | Total | | 10 | 0 | 3 | 1 | — | | 0 | 0 | 13 | 1 |
| Deportes Copiapó | 2012 | Segunda División | 21 | 13 | 0 | 0 | — | | 4 (Note: Appearance(s) in the Segunda División play-offs) | 2 | 25 | 15 |
| Deportes Copiapó | 2013 | Primera B | 10 | 3 | 5 | 2 | — | | 0 | 0 | 15 | 5 |
| Deportes Copiapó | 2013–14 | Primera B | 33 | 8 | 0 | 0 | — | | 0 | 0 | 33 | 8 |
| Deportes Copiapó | Total | | 64 | 24 | 5 | 2 | — | | 4 | 2 | 73 | 28 |
| Huachipato | 2014–15 | Primera División | 10 | 0 | 3 | 0 | 5 (Note: Appearance(s) in the Copa Sudamericana) | 0 | 1 | 0 | 19 | 0 |
| Concepción | 2015–16 | Primera B | 29 | 4 | 4 | 0 | — | | 0 | 0 | 33 | 4 |
| Deportes Copiapó | 2016–17 | Primera B | 24 | 1 | 2 | 0 | — | | 0 | 0 | 26 | 1 |
| Arameisk-Syrianska IF | 2017 | Division 1 Norra | 7 | 4 | 0 | 0 | — | | 0 | 0 | 7 | 4 |
| San Marcos | 2018 | Primera B | 14 | 1 | 6 | 2 | — | | 0 | 0 | 20 | 3 |
| Deportes Copiapó | 2019 | Primera B | 1 | 0 | 0 | 0 | — | | 0 | 0 | 1 | 0 |
| Career total | | | 186 | 35 | 23 | 5 | 5 | 0 | 5 | 2 | 219 | 42 |
