= Jorge Aquino =

Paraguayan footballer (born 1987)

Personal information
- Full name: Jorge Daniel Aquino Guerrero
- Date of birth: 14 December 1987 (age 38)
- Place of birth: Ciudad del Este, Paraguay
- Height: 1.81 m (5 ft 11 in)
- Position: Defender

Senior career*
Years	Team	Apps	(Gls)
2007–2008	Curicó Unido	82	(1)
2009–2010	Rangers	13	(0)
2011–2013	Naval	68	(3)
2010	→ Sol de América (loan)	1	(0)
2013–2014	Deportes Concepción	39	(0)
2014–2016	Curicó Unido	54	(1)
2016–2017	Deportes La Serena	32	(7)
2018–2019	Deportes Puerto Montt	43	(1)
2020	Rangers	21	(0)
2021–2022	Santiago Morning	43	(0)
2023	Deportes Rengo	22	(0)
Total		418	(13)
- * Club domestic league appearances and goals

Jorge Daniel Aquino Guerrero (born 14 December 1987) is a Paraguayan former footballer who played as a defender.

== Career ==
Born in Juan León Mallorquín village, Ciudad del Este, Paraguay, Aquino came to Chile in 2007 joining Curicó Unido. Since then, he has mainly developed his career in Chile, playing for clubs such as Rangers de Talca, Naval, Deportes Concepción, among others. In 2010, he had a brief stint with Sol de América in his homeland.

In 2023, Aquino joined Deportes Rengo in the Segunda División Profesional de Chile.

Aquino officially retired in 2025.

== Personal life ==
Aquino naturalized Chilean by residence.
