= Diego Cerón =

Chilean footballer (born 1991)

Personal information
- Full name: Diego Andrés Cerón Silva
- Date of birth: 15 September 1991 (age 35)
- Place of birth: Cerro Navia, Santiago, Chile
- Height: 1.78 m (5 ft 10 in)
- Position: Defender

Team information
- Current team: Provincial Ovalle
- Number: 22

Senior career*
Years	Team	Apps	(Gls)
2010–2016	Cobresal	2	(0)
2013–2014	→ San Antonio Unido (loan)	41	(5)
2014–2015	→ Malleco Unido (loan)	13	(1)
2016–2024	Santiago Morning	88	(3)
2022	→ San Marcos (loan)	20	(1)
2025	Deportes Rengo	11	(0)
2025	Santiago Morning	9	(0)
2026–	Provincial Ovalle	0	(0)
- * Club domestic league appearances and goals as of 30 January 2026

Diego Andrés Cerón Silva (born 15 September 1991) is a Chilean professional footballer who plays as a defender for Provincial Ovalle.

== Career ==
In the second half of 2025, Cerón returned to Santiago Morning after a brief stint with Deportes Rengo. The next year, he switched to Provincial Ovalle.

== Honours ==
Cobresal

- Primera División de Chile: 2015 Clausura
