= Benjamín Inostroza =

Chilean footballer (born 1997)

Personal information
- Full name: Benjamín Andrés Inostroza Zuñiga
- Date of birth: April 25, 1997 (age 29)
- Place of birth: Santiago, Chile
- Height: 1.65 m (5 ft 5 in)
- Position: Forward

Team information
- Current team: Curicó Unido
- Number: 17

Youth career
- 2008–2015: Universidad de Chile

Senior career*
Years	Team	Apps	(Gls)
2012–2017	Universidad de Chile	1	(0)
2015–2017	→ Deportes Pintana (loan)	25	(3)
2017	Audax Italiano	0	(0)
2018	Colchagua	15	(1)
2019–2020	Rancagua Sur	–	(–)
2020–2021	Real San Joaquín	–	(–)
2021	Iberia	17	(9)
2022	Deportes Limache	17	(1)
2023	Iberia	6	(4)
2024–2025	Deportes Melipilla	31	(16)
2026–	Curicó Unido	0	(0)
- * Club domestic league appearances and goals as of 24 December 2025

Benjamín Andrés Inostroza Zuñiga (born 25 April 1997) is a Chilean footballer who currently plays for Curicó Unido.

== Career ==
He debuted on 12 September 2012 in a match against Santiago Morning for the 2012 Copa Chile, scoring the second goal of Universidad de Chile in the match, and becoming the youngest Chilean player to score in an official match. He played his first league match on 29 September in a match against Unión La Calera

However, Inostroza's career didn't go as expected. He failed to find a regular place in U. de Chile's senior side and went on loan to lower-division Deportes Pintana. Later he joined Audax Italiano's youth side, but never made it into the club's senior side. Inostroza spent the rest of his career in the lower divisions of Chilean football.

In December 2025, Inostroza signed with Curicó Unido from Deportes Melipilla.

== Career statistics ==
=== Club ===
Club	Season	League		Continental		Cup		Total	
Club	Season	Apps	Goals	Apps	Goals	Apps	Goals	Apps	Goals
Universidad de Chile	2012	1	0	0	0	3	1	4	1
Universidad de Chile	2013	0	0	0	0	0	0	0	0
Universidad de Chile	2013–14	0	0	0	0	0	0	0	0
Universidad de Chile	2014–15	0	0	0	0	0	0	0	0
Universidad de Chile	Total	1	0	0	0	3	1	4	1
Deportes Pintana	2015–16	18	3	—		0	0	18	3
Deportes Pintana	Total	18	3	—		0	0	18	3
Career total		19	3	0	0	3	1	22	4
