= Sebastián Zúñiga =

Chilean footballer (born 1990)

Personal information
- Full name: Sebastián Felipe Zúñiga Fuenzalida
- Date of birth: June 21, 1990 (age 36)
- Place of birth: Santiago, Chile
- Height: 1.74 m (5 ft 9 in)
- Position: Attacking midfielder

Team information
- Current team: Cobreloa

Youth career
- Cobreloa

Senior career*
| Years | Team | Apps | (Gls) |
| 2009–2012 | Cobreloa | 56 | (4) |
| 2013–2017 | Unión San Felipe | 49 | (21) |
| 2014 | → Universidad de Chile (loan) | 0 | (0) |
| 2015 | → Cobresal (loan) | 12 | (2) |
| 2015–2016 | → San Luis (loan) | 19 | (1) |
| 2017–2018 | Curicó Unido | 39 | (4) |
| 2019 | Unión La Calera | 12 | (2) |
| 2020–2021 | Deportes Iquique | 18 | (3) |
| 2021 | Rangers | 21 | (4) |
| 2022 | Fernández Vial | 18 | (1) |
| 2023 | Eléctrico Refinería | – | (–) |
| 2024 | Deportes Linares | 21 | (1) |
| 2025– | Cobreloa | 0 | (0) |
- * Club domestic league appearances and goals

Sebastián Felipe Zúñiga Fuenzalida (born June 21, 1990) is a Chilean footballer who plays as an attacking midfielder for Cobreloa.

== Career ==
A product of Cobreloa, Zúñiga had a stint with Universidad de Chile in 2014.

His last clubs were Eléctrico Refinería from Calama and Deportes Linares in the Segunda División Profesional de Chile.

Zúñiga announced his retirement on 20 October 2024. He returned to the activity by signing with Cobreloa in February 2025.

== Honours ==
Universidad de Chile

- Primera División de Chile: 2014 Apertura

Cobresal

- Primera División: 2015 Clausura

Curicó Unido

- Primera B de Chile: 2016–17

Cobreloa

- Primera B de Chile: 2026
