= Carlos Oyaneder =

Chilean footballer

Personal information
- Full name: Carlos Alfredo Oyaneder González
- Date of birth: 7 July 1990 (age 36)
- Place of birth: Cabildo, Chile
- Height: 1.74 m (5 ft 9 in)
- Position: Forward

Team information
- Current team: Deportivo La Higuera
- Number: 9

Youth career
- Bellavista
- 2002–2005: Cabildo (city team)
- Huachipato

Senior career*
Years	Team	Apps	(Gls)
2009	AGC Cabildo	–	(–)
2010	San Antonio Unido	–	(–)
2011	Deportivo La Higuera	–	(–)
2011–2012	PSSB Bireuen	–	(–)
2012	Dínamo Quillota	–	(–)
2013–2015	San Luis	38	(7)
2015–2018	Cobresal	50	(7)
2019	Deportes Santa Cruz	17	(1)
2022–	Deportivo La Higuera	–	(–)

International career
2007	Chile U17	4	(1)
- * Club domestic league appearances and goals

Carlos Alfredo Oyaneder González (born 7 July 1990) is a Chilean professional footballer who plays as a forward for Deportivo La Higuera.

== Club career ==
Born in Cabildo, Chile, as a child, Oyaneder was with club Bellavista and represented the Cabildo youth team at both national and international tournaments. After a stint with the Huachipato youth system, he joined AGC Cabildo in the Tercera A in 2009. Next, he played for San Antonio Unido (2010) in the same division and Deportivo La Higuera (2011).

In 2011, he moved to Indonesia and played for PSSB Bireuen, where he came thanks to the Chilean coach Simón Elissetche. He returned to Chile in second half 2012 and played for club Dínamo from Quillota.

In 2013, he joined San Luis de Quillota, with whom he won the 2013 Apertura and the 2014–15 season of the Primera B de Chile.

From 2015 to 2018 he played for Cobresal, with whom he got promotion to the top level in 2018.

In 2019, he played for Deportes Santa Cruz.

In 2022, he played for Deportivo La Higuera, making appearances in the 2022 Copa Chile.

== International career ==
Oyaneder represented Chile at under-17 level in the 2007 South American Championship, where he made appearances against Bolivia, Ecuador and Peru. Previously, he made an appearance in a friendly against Uruguay, where he scored a goal.

== Honours ==
San Luis

- Primera B de Chile: 2013 Apertura, 2014–15
