= Flavio Rojas =

Chilean footballer (born 1994)

Personal information
- Full name: Flavio Germán Rojas Catalán
- Date of birth: January 16, 1994 (age 32)
- Place of birth: Santiago, Chile
- Height: 1.85 m (6 ft 1 in)
- Position: Centre-back

Team information
- Current team: Deportes Linares
- Number: 3

Youth career
- Cobresal

Senior career*
Years	Team	Apps	(Gls)
2014–2019	Cobresal	64	(2)
2020	Coquimbo Unido	1	(0)
2020	Unión San Felipe	5	(0)
2021	Deportes Puerto Montt	11	(0)
2022–2023	San Antonio Unido	40	(2)
2024–	Deportes Linares	28	(3)
- * Club domestic league appearances and goals as of 4 May 2025

Flavio Germán Rojas Catalán (born January 16, 1994) is a Chilean footballer who currently plays for Chilean club Deportes Linares as a central defender.

== Career ==
After staying all his career in Cobresal, also winning the 2015 Torneo Clausura at the Primera División, he joined Coquimbo Unido on 2020 season., where played only one match. So, he joined Primera B club Unión San Felipe on second half 2020.

== Honors ==
Cobresal

- Primera División (1): 2015-C
