= Jorge Henríquez =

Chilean footballer (born 1994)

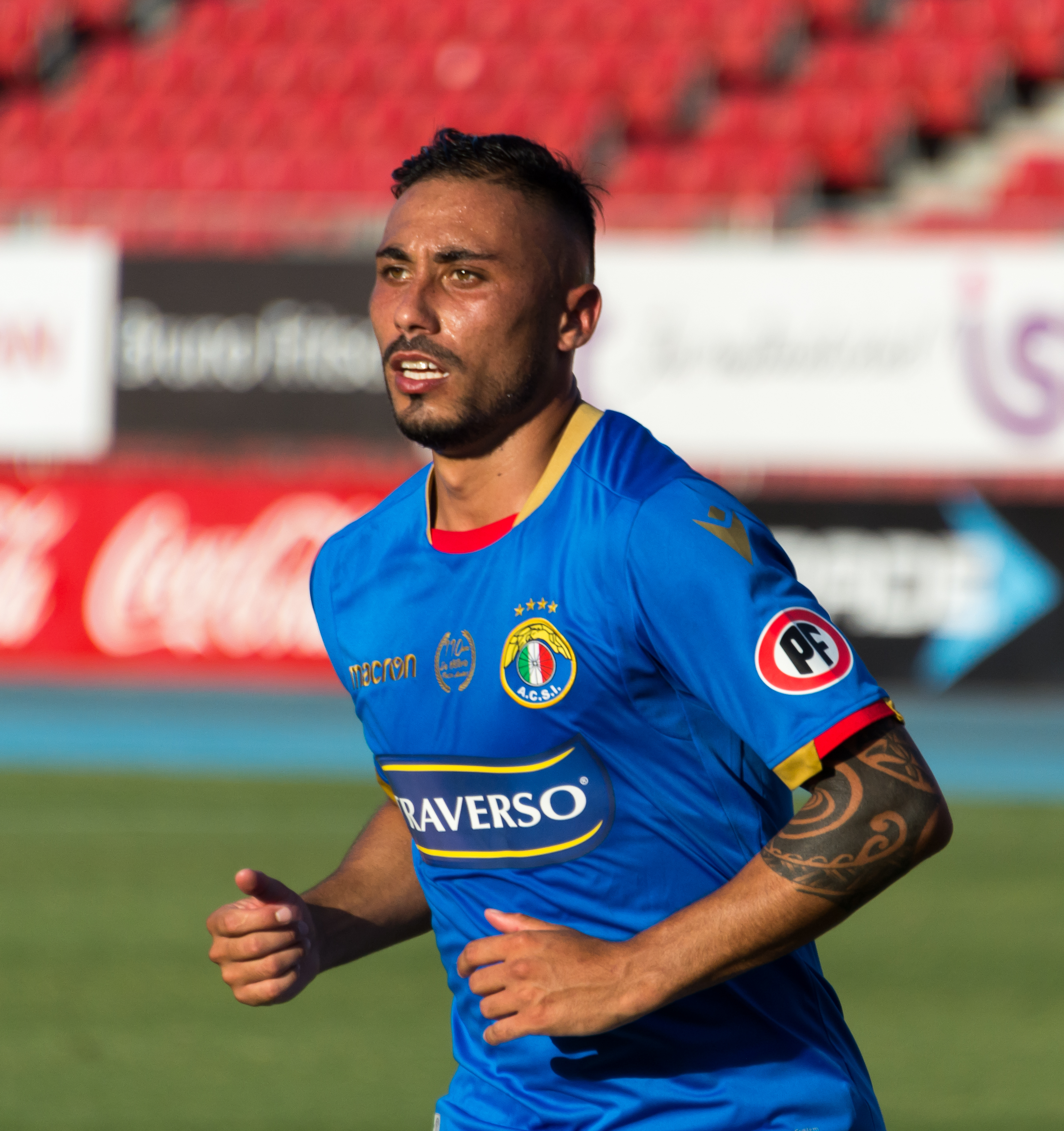
- Henríquez with Audax Italiano in 2020

Personal information
- Full name: Jorge Alexis Henríquez Neira
- Date of birth: 17 June 1994 (age 32)
- Place of birth: Santiago, Chile
- Position: Midfielder

Team information
- Current team: Deportes Concepción
- Number: 20

Youth career
- Audax Italiano

Senior career*
| Years | Team | Apps | (Gls) |
| 2013 | Audax Italiano B | 3 | (0) |
| 2014–2022 | Audax Italiano | 78 | (6) |
| 2016–2017 | → San Marcos (loan) | 19 | (1) |
| 2018 | → Barnechea (loan) | 12 | (4) |
| 2023 | Ñublense | 14 | (1) |
| 2023 | → Curicó Unido (loan) | 2 | (0) |
| 2024 | Coquimbo Unido | 9 | (2) |
| 2025 | Cobresal | 27 | (9) |
| 2026– | Deportes Concepción | 0 | (0) |
- * Club domestic league appearances and goals as of 10 December 2025

Jorge Alexis Henríquez Neira (born 17 June 1994) is a Chilean footballer who plays as a midfielder for Deportes Concepción.

== Career ==
In 2024, Henríquez signed with Coquimbo Unido. The next year, he switched to Cobresal.

In December 2025, Henríquez joined Deportes Concepción.
