= Albano Becica =

Argentine footballer

Personal information
- Full name: Hernán Albano Becica
- Date of birth: 31 July 1985 (age 41)
- Place of birth: Villa de María, Córdoba, Argentina
- Height: 1.73 m (5 ft 8 in)
- Position: Midfielder

Team information
- Current team: Provincial Ovalle
- Number: 10

Senior career*
Years	Team	Apps	(Gls)
2006	Bochas Sport	–	(–)
2007–2009	Racing de Córdoba	69	(10)
2009–2010	Los Andes	15	(1)
2010–2011	Defensores de Belgrano	55	(2)
2011–2012	Racing de Córdoba	25	(4)
2012–2013	Talleres	21	(2)
2013–2014	San Martín Tucumán	40	(8)
2015	Atlético Tucumán	6	(0)
2016	Tristán Suárez	7	(0)
2016	Mitre	7	(0)
2017	Deportes La Serena	24	(6)
2018	Deportes Puerto Montt	27	(4)
2019	Magallanes	16	(0)
2020–2021	Rangers	25	(3)
2021–2023	Deportes Santa Cruz	87	(13)
2024–2025	Deportes Melipilla	39	(6)
2026–	Provincial Ovalle	0	(0)
- * Club domestic league appearances and goals as of 30 January 2026

Hernán Albano Becica (born 31 July 1985), known as Albano Becica, is an Argentine footballer who plays as a midfielder for Chilean club Provincial Ovalle.

== Club career ==
Born in Villa de María del Río Seco, Córdoba, Argentina, Becica started his career with Bochas Sport Club from Colonia Caroya. In his homeland, he has played for Racing de Córdoba, Los Andes, Defensores de Belgrano, Talleres de Cordoba, San Martín de Tucumán, Atlético Tucumán, Tristán Suárez and Mitre.

As a member of Talleres, he won the 2012–13 Torneo Argentino A. As a member of Atlético Tucumán, he won the 2015 Primera B Nacional.

In January 2017, he moved to Chile and signed with Deportes La Serena. Since then, he has stayed in that country playing for Deportes Puerto Montt, Magallanes, Rangers, Deportes Santa Cruz and Deportes Melipilla.

On 28 January 2026, Becica joined Provincial Ovalle.
