= Diego Urzúa =

Chilean footballer (born 1997)

Personal information
- Full name: Diego Alonso Urzúa Rojas
- Date of birth: 4 February 1997 (age 29)
- Place of birth: Molina, Chile
- Height: 1.73 m (5 ft 8 in)
- Position: Midfielder

Team information
- Current team: Deportes Santa Cruz
- Number: 14

Youth career
- Curicó Unido

Senior career*
Years	Team	Apps	(Gls)
2016–2024	Curicó Unido	93	(2)
2018	→ Iberia (loan)	19	(1)
2023	→ Deportes Puerto Montt (loan)	13	(0)
2025–	Deportes Santa Cruz	8	(0)
- * Club domestic league appearances and goals

Diego Alonso Urzúa Rojas (born 4 February 1997) is a Chilean professional footballer who plays as a midfielder for Deportes Santa Cruz.

== Career ==
For the 2018 season, Urzúa was sent on loan to Chilean third division side Iberia.

Urzúa represented Chile at the 2018 Red Bull Street Style World Finals.

In 2025, Urzúa joined Deportes Santa Cruz from Curicó Unido.
