= José Tiznado =

Chilean footballer

Personal information
- Full name: José Danilo Tiznado Contreras
- Date of birth: 3 September 1994 (age 32)
- Place of birth: Concepción, Chile
- Height: 1.84 m (6 ft 0 in)
- Position: Centre-back

Team information
- Current team: Cobresal
- Number: 20

Youth career
- Unión Miramar

Senior career*
| Years | Team | Apps | (Gls) |
| 2012–2017 | Naval | 97 | (6) |
| 2013 | → Fernández Vial (loan) | – | (–) |
| 2017–2022 | Deportes Copiapó | 122 | (8) |
| 2023–2024 | Unión Española | 44 | (1) |
| 2025– | Cobresal | 19 | (0) |
- * Club domestic league appearances and goals as of 31 August 2025

José Danilo Tiznado Contreras (born 3 September 1994) is a Chilean footballer who plays as a centre-back for Chilean Primera División side Cobresal.

== Club career ==
A defender, Tiznado was trained at Unión Miramar from San Pedro de la Paz. In 2012, he joined Naval until 2017, with a stint on loan at Fernández Vial in 2013.

In the second half of 2017, Tiznado moved to Deportes Copiapó in the Primera B de Chile. On 19 December 2020, he suffered a tibia fracture in the 2–2 draw against Barnechea. With them, he got promotion to the Chilean Primera División for the 2023 season.

On 26 December 2022, Tiznado signed with Unión Española in the Chilean top division. In 2025, he switched to Cobresal.
