= Roberto Hernández (Uruguayan footballer) =

Uruguayan footballer (born 1994)

Personal information
- Full name: Roberto Carlos Hernández Rodríguez
- Date of birth: 20 March 1994 (age 32)
- Place of birth: Montevideo, Uruguay
- Height: 1.87 m (6 ft 2 in)
- Position: Centre-back

Team information
- Current team: Cerrito

Youth career
- Miramar Misiones

Senior career*
| Years | Team | Apps | (Gls) |
| 2013–2015 | Miramar Misiones | 9 | (0) |
| 2015–2017 | Juventud Las Piedras | 31 | (1) |
| 2017 | Villa Española | 12 | (0) |
| 2018 | Barnechea | 21 | (0) |
| 2019 | Juventud Las Piedras | 12 | (0) |
| 2020 | Tacuarembó | 3 | (0) |
| 2020 | Sportivo Luqueño | 1 | (0) |
| 2021 | San Marcos | 27 | (0) |
| 2022 | Gimnasia de Jujuy | 11 | (0) |
| 2022–2023 | La Luz | 24 | (0) |
| 2023–2024 | Rentistas | 23 | (0) |
| 2024 | Puntarenas | 6 | (0) |
| 2025 | Tacuarembó | 23 | (1) |
| 2026– | Cerrito | 17 | (0) |
- * Club domestic league appearances and goals as of 18 April 2024

Roberto Carlos Hernández Rodríguez (born 30 March 1994) is a Uruguayan footballer who plays as a centre-back for Cerrito.

== Club career ==
Born in Montevideo, Uruguay, Hernández started his career with Miramar Misiones. From 2015 to 2017 he played for Juventud Las Piedras and Villa Española.

In 2018, he moved abroad and signed with Barnechea in the Primera B de Chile. The next year, he returned to Uruguay and rejoined Juventud Las Piedras.

In the first half of 2020, he played for Tacuarembó. In October of the same year, he signed with Sportivo Luqueño in the Paraguayan top division, with whom he made an appearance in the 2020 Copa Sudamericana.

In 2021, he moved to Chile again and played for San Marcos de Arica. The next year, he joined Gimnasia y Esgrima de Jujuy in the Argentine Primera Nacional.

Back to Uruguay, he joined La Luz in July 2022 and switched to Rentistas in 2023.

On 1 January 2026, Hernández joined Cerrito.
