= Sebastián Varas =

Chilean footballer (born 1988)

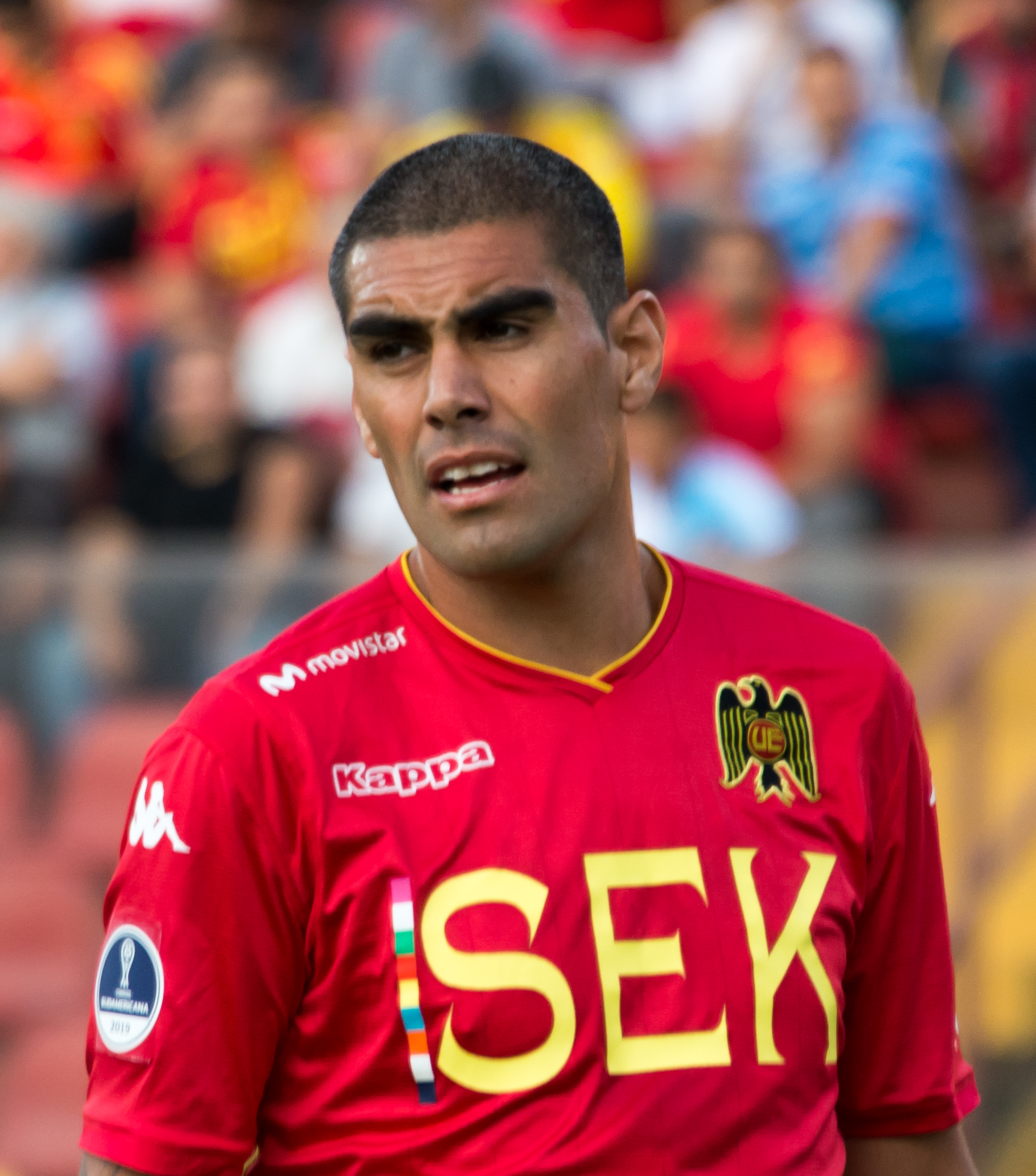
- Varas with Unión Española in 2019

Personal information
- Full name: Sebastián Esteban Varas Moreno
- Date of birth: August 1, 1988 (age 38)
- Place of birth: Viña del Mar, Chile
- Height: 1.84 m (6 ft 1/2 in)
- Position: Striker

Youth career
- Everton

Senior career*
Years	Team	Apps	(Gls)
2005–2006	Everton	21	(3)
2007–2008	O'Higgins	35	(4)
2009–2012	San Luis	74	(12)
2013	Rangers	15	(4)
2013–2018	Ñublense	125	(46)
2013	Ñublense B	1	(0)
2016–2017	→ Everton (loan)	9	(2)
2019	Unión Española	22	(8)
2020–2021	Cobresal	45	(9)
2022	Deportes Puerto Montt	25	(1)
2023	Deportes Rengo	18	(7)
Total		390	(96)
- * Club domestic league appearances and goals

Sebastián Esteban Varas Moreno (born August 1, 1988) is a former Chilean footballer who played as a striker.

== Career ==
A product of Everton de Viña del Mar, Varas has an extensive career in his homeland.

In February 2023, he joined Deportes Rengo in the Segunda División Profesional de Chile.

In March 2024, he announced his retirement.

== Post-retirement ==
Following his stint with Deportes Rengo, he worked in cherry picking. At the same time, he has worked as a football teacher.

On 21 March 2024, he assumed as sport manager of Deportes Rengo. In January 2026, he assumed the same charge for Concón National.

Varas started a women's football academy in Rengo commune.

== Titles ==
San Luis Quillota

- Primera B (1): 2009
