= Gustavo Lanaro =

Argentine-Chilean footballer (born 1986)

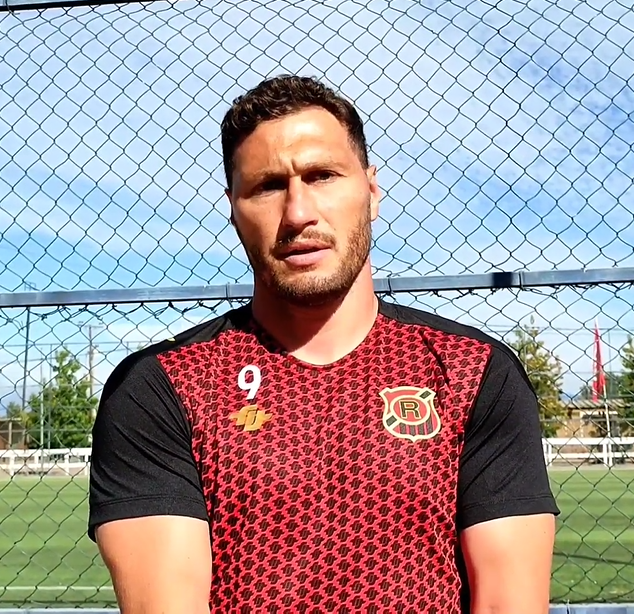
- Lanaro with Rangers de Talca in 2022

Personal information
- Full name: Gustavo Martín Lanaro
- Date of birth: 21 March 1986 (age 40)
- Place of birth: Villa Regina, Argentina
- Height: 1.86 m (6 ft 1 in)
- Position: Forward

Youth career
- 2001–2006: Huracán

Senior career*
| Years | Team | Apps | (Gls) |
| 2007–2009 | San Telmo | 6 | (0) |
| 2008 | → Lugano (loan) | 2 | (0) |
| 2009 | → Huracán Laboulaye (loan) | – | (–) |
| 2010–2014 | General Lamadrid | 87 | (19) |
| 2012 | → Grupo Universitario (loan) | 12 | (3) |
| 2014–2015 | Unión San Felipe | 20 | (8) |
| 2015–2016 | Coquimbo Unido | 15 | (1) |
| 2016–2018 | Deportes Valdivia | 49 | (20) |
| 2019–2021 | Santiago Wanderers | 33 | (11) |
| 2021 | San Luis | 20 | (4) |
| 2022 | Rangers | 12 | (0) |
| 2023 | San Antonio Unido | 9 | (0) |
| Total | | 265 | (66) |
- * Club domestic league appearances and goals

Gustavo Martín Lanaro (born March 21, 1986) is an Argentine-Chilean former footballer who played as a forward.

== Post-retirement ==
Following his retirement, Lanaro started a football agency and also has served as a real estate agent.

== Personal life ==
He's the twin brother of Germán Lanaro. They both naturalized Chilean by descent, since their grandmother is Chilean.
