= Rodrigo Moya =

Chilean footballer (born 1994)

Personal information
- Full name: Rodrigo Nicolás Moya Garrido
- Date of birth: May 25, 1994 (age 32)
- Place of birth: Santiago, Chile
- Height: 1.78 m (5 ft 10 in)
- Position: Defender

Youth career
- Universidad de Chile

Senior career*
Years	Team	Apps	(Gls)
2013–2014	Universidad de Chile	2	(0)
2013	→ Barnechea (loan)	9	(2)
2014	→ Magallanes (loan)	2	(0)
2014–2015	Deportes Melipilla	25	(1)
2015–2016	Coquimbo Unido	16	(0)
2017–2018	Colchagua	38	(2)
2019	Deportes Recoleta	23	(2)
- * Club domestic league appearances and goals as of 9 March 2018

Rodrigo Nicolás Moya Garrido (born 25 May 1994) is a Chilean footballer who last played for Deportes Recoleta as a defender.

== Career ==
He debuted on 1 February 2013 in a match against Audax Italiano for the 2013 Torneo Transición.
