= Byron Nieto =

Chilean footballer (born 1998)

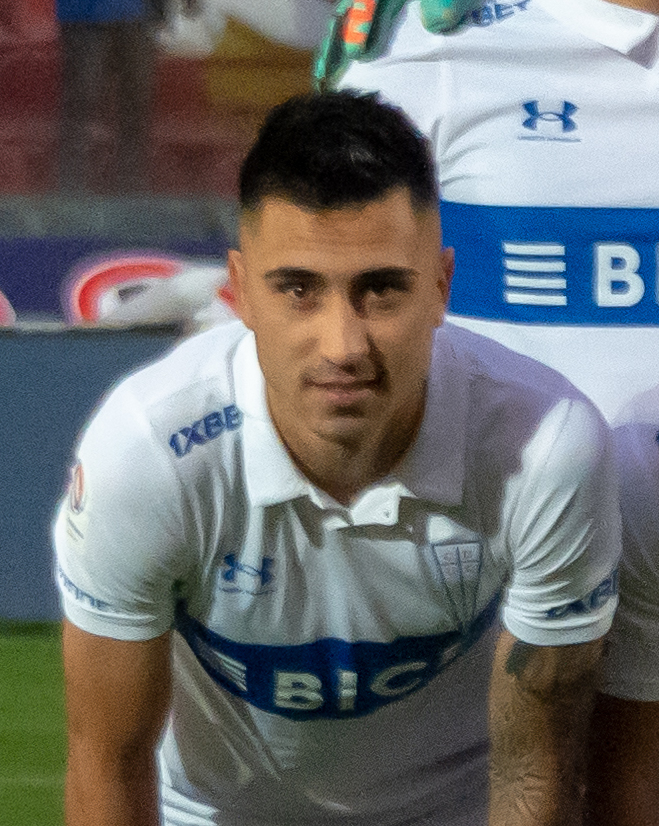
- Nieto with Universidad Católica in 2023

Personal information
- Full name: Byron Rodrigo Nieto Salinas
- Date of birth: 3 February 1998 (age 28)
- Place of birth: Recoleta, Santiago, Chile
- Position: Right-back

Team information
- Current team: Deportes Puerto Montt
- Number: 17

Youth career
- Universidad Católica
- Barnechea

Senior career*
Years	Team	Apps	(Gls)
2016–2019	Barnechea	25	(1)
2017	→ Deportes Recoleta (loan)	13	(2)
2019–2025	Deportes Antofagasta	119	(9)
2023	→ Universidad Católica (loan)	24	(0)
2024	→ Deportes Copiapó (loan)	23	(0)
2026–	Deportes Puerto Montt	0	(0)
- * Club domestic league appearances and goals as of 22 December 2025

Byron Rodrigo Nieto Salinas (born 3 February 1998) is a Chilean footballer who plays as a right-back for Deportes Puerto Montt.

== Career ==
As a player of Deportes Antofagasta, Nieto was loaned to Universidad Católica in 2023. In 2024, he was loaned to Deportes Copiapó.

On 22 December 2025, Nieto signed with Deportes Puerto Montt.
