= Iván Ledezma =

Chilean footballer (born 1995)

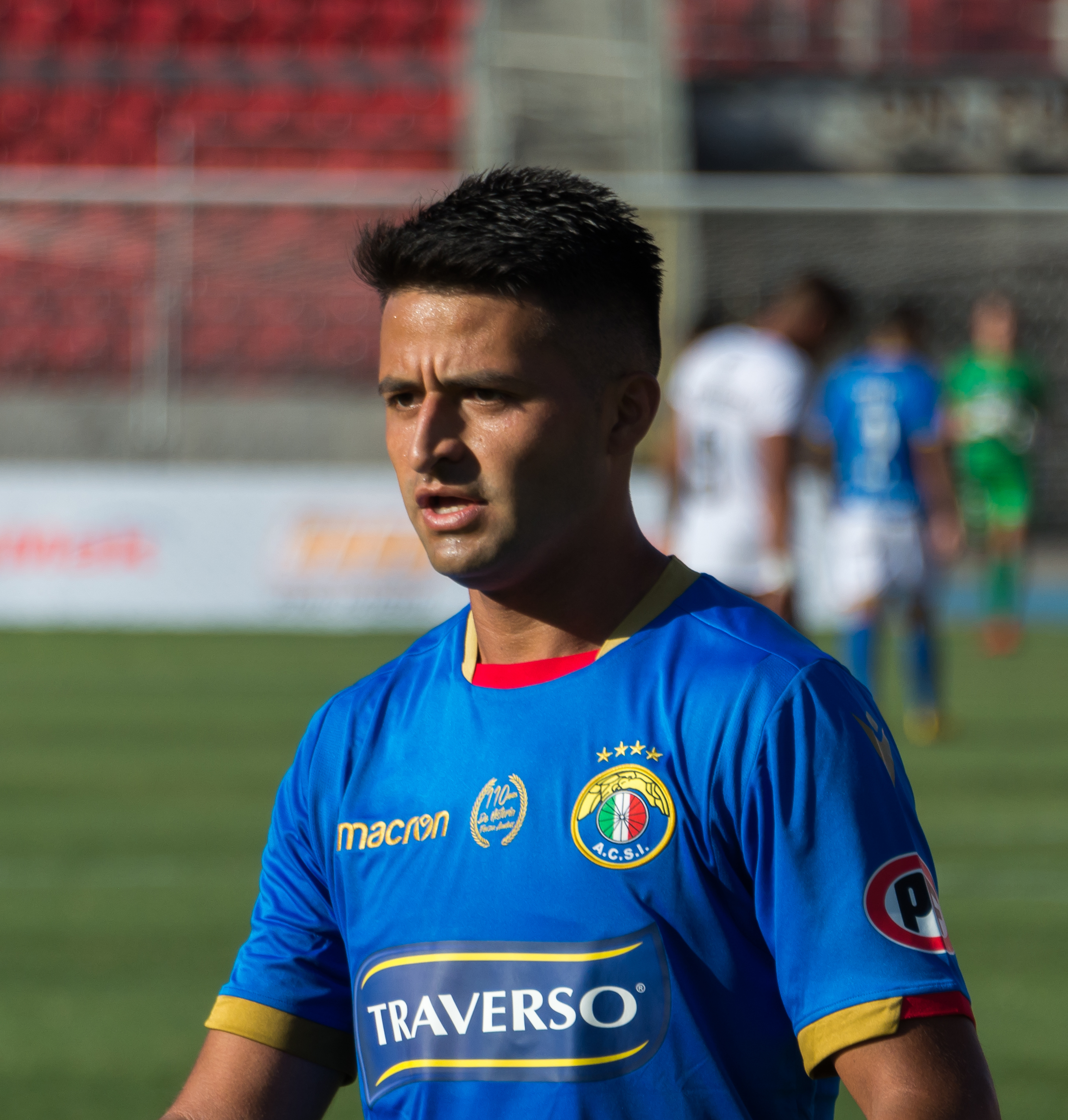
- Ledezma with Audax Italiano in 2020

Personal information
- Full name: Iván Patricio Ledezma Ahumada
- Date of birth: 19 June 1995 (age 31)
- Place of birth: Antofagasta, Chile
- Height: 1.75 m (5 ft 9 in)
- Position: Attacking midfielder

Team information
- Current team: Deportes Copiapó
- Number: 10

Youth career
- Cobreloa

Senior career*
Years	Team	Apps	(Gls)
2014–2016	Cobreloa	48	(7)
2016–2017	Coquimbo Unido	42	(8)
2018–2021	Audax Italiano	57	(16)
2021–2023	Deportes Antofagasta	33	(1)
2023	→ Rangers (loan)	10	(0)
2024	Deportes Santa Cruz	28	(2)
2025	Cobreloa	34	(3)
2026–	Deportes Copiapó	0	(0)

International career
2014	Chile U20		
- * Club domestic league appearances and goals as of 18 January 2026

Iván Patricio Ledezma Ahumada (born 19 June 1995) is a Chilean footballer who plays as a midfielder for Deportes Copiapó of the Primera B de Chile.

== Club career ==
After his stints with Cobreloa, Coquimbo Unido, Audax Italiano and Deportes Antofagasta, Ledezma joined Rangers de Talca in the second half of 2023.

Ledezma returned to Cobreloa for the 2025 season. The next season, he switched to Deportes Copiapó.

== International career ==
Ledezma represented Chile U20 at the Torneo Cuatro Naciones Chile 2014.

== Career statistics ==
As of 6 February 2022.

Appearances and goals by club, season and competition
Club	Division	League			Cup		Continental		Total	
Club	Division	Season	Apps	Goals	Apps	Goals	Apps	Goals	Apps	Goals
Cobreloa	Chilean Primera División	2013–14	7	2	—		—		7	2
Cobreloa	Chilean Primera División	2014–15	14	0	2	1	—		16	1
Cobreloa	Primera B de Chile	2015–16	27	5	10	1	—		37	6
Cobreloa	Total		48	7	12	2	0	0	60	9
Coquimbo Unido	Primera B de Chile	2016–17	28	4	2	0	—		30	4
Coquimbo Unido	Primera B de Chile	2017	14	4	4	4	—		18	4
Coquimbo Unido	Total		42	8	6	4	0	0	48	12
Audax Italiano	Chilean Primera División	2018	18	5	10	5	1	0	29	10
Audax Italiano	Chilean Primera División	2019	22	7	4	0	—		26	7
Audax Italiano	Chilean Primera División	2020	27	6	—		2	0	29	6
Audax Italiano	Total		67	18	14	5	3	0	84	23
Deportes Antofagasta	Chilean Primera División	2021	16	0	0	0	1	0	17	0
Deportes Antofagasta	Chilean Primera División	2022	13	1	3	0	4	0	20	1
Deportes Antofagasta	Primera B de Chile	2023	4	0	1	0	—		5	0
Deportes Antofagasta	Total		33	1	4	0	5	0	42	1
Rangers	Primera B de Chile	2023	9	0	1	0	—		10	0
Career total			199	34	37	11	8	0	244	45
