= Gonzalo Reyes =

Chilean footballer

Personal information
- Full name: Gonzalo Alberto Reyes Mella
- Date of birth: 5 September 1995 (age 31)
- Place of birth: Santiago, Chile
- Height: 1.69 m (5 ft 7 in)
- Position: Forward

Team information
- Current team: San Marcos

Youth career
- Santiago Morning

Senior career*
Years	Team	Apps	(Gls)
2012–2019	Santiago Morning	113	(15)
2019–2021	Juventud Las Piedras	14	(1)
2020	→ Montevideo Wanderers (loan)	9	(0)
2021–2024	Unión San Felipe	45	(5)
2023	→ Deportes La Serena (loan)	22	(4)
2024	→ Rangers (loan)	31	(3)
2025	Rangers	28	(2)
2026–	San Marcos	0	(0)

International career
2014	Chile U20	4	(1)
- * Club domestic league appearances and goals as of 25 December 2025

Gonzalo Alberto Reyes Mella (born 5 September 1995) is a Chilean footballer who plays as a forward for San Marcos de Arica.

== Club career ==
A product of Santiago Morning youth system, Reyes played for them until 2019.

In the second half of 2019, Reyes moved to Uruguay and signed with Uruguayan Primera División side Juventud de Las Piedras. The next year, he switched on loan to Montevideo Wanderers in the same division.

After ending his contract in Uruguay, Reyes returned to his homeland and joined Unión San Felipe. In the 2023 season, he joined Deportes La Serena on loan. The next year, he switched to Rangers.

Reyes renewed with Rangers for the 2025 season.

Reyes joined San Marcos de Arica for the 2026 season.

== International career ==
Reyes performed as a sparring player for the Chile national team led by Jorge Sampaoli.

In 2014, he represented Chile U20 in a draw against Paraguay, scoring a goal, and at the 2014 NTC Invitational in the United States, making three appearances.
