= Camilo Rencoret =

Chilean footballer (born 1991)

Personal information
- Full name: Camilo Elías Rencoret Lecaros
- Date of birth: 4 January 1991 (age 35)
- Place of birth: Viña del Mar, Chile
- Position: Defensive midfielder

Team information
- Current team: San Marcos de Arica
- Number: 26

Youth career
- Everton

Senior career*
Years	Team	Apps	(Gls)
2010–2013	Everton	24	(0)
2012	→ Barnechea (loan)	28	(0)
2013–2015	Barnechea	76	(3)
2016	San Luis	9	(0)
2016–2021	Barnechea	109	(1)
2022	Deportes Copiapó	3	(0)
2023	Barnechea	23	(0)
2024	Deportes Santa Cruz	25	(0)
2025–	San Marcos	30	(1)
- * Club domestic league appearances and goals as of 2 February 2026

Camilo Elías Rencoret Lecaros (born 4 January 1991) is a Chilean professional footballer who plays as a defensive midfielder for San Marcos de Arica.
