= Luis Valenzuela Hermosilla Stadium =

Stadium in Copiapó, Chile

Coordinates: 27°22′36″S 70°19′15″W

Estadio Luis Valenzuela Hermosilla
- Estadio Luis Valenzuela Hermosilla
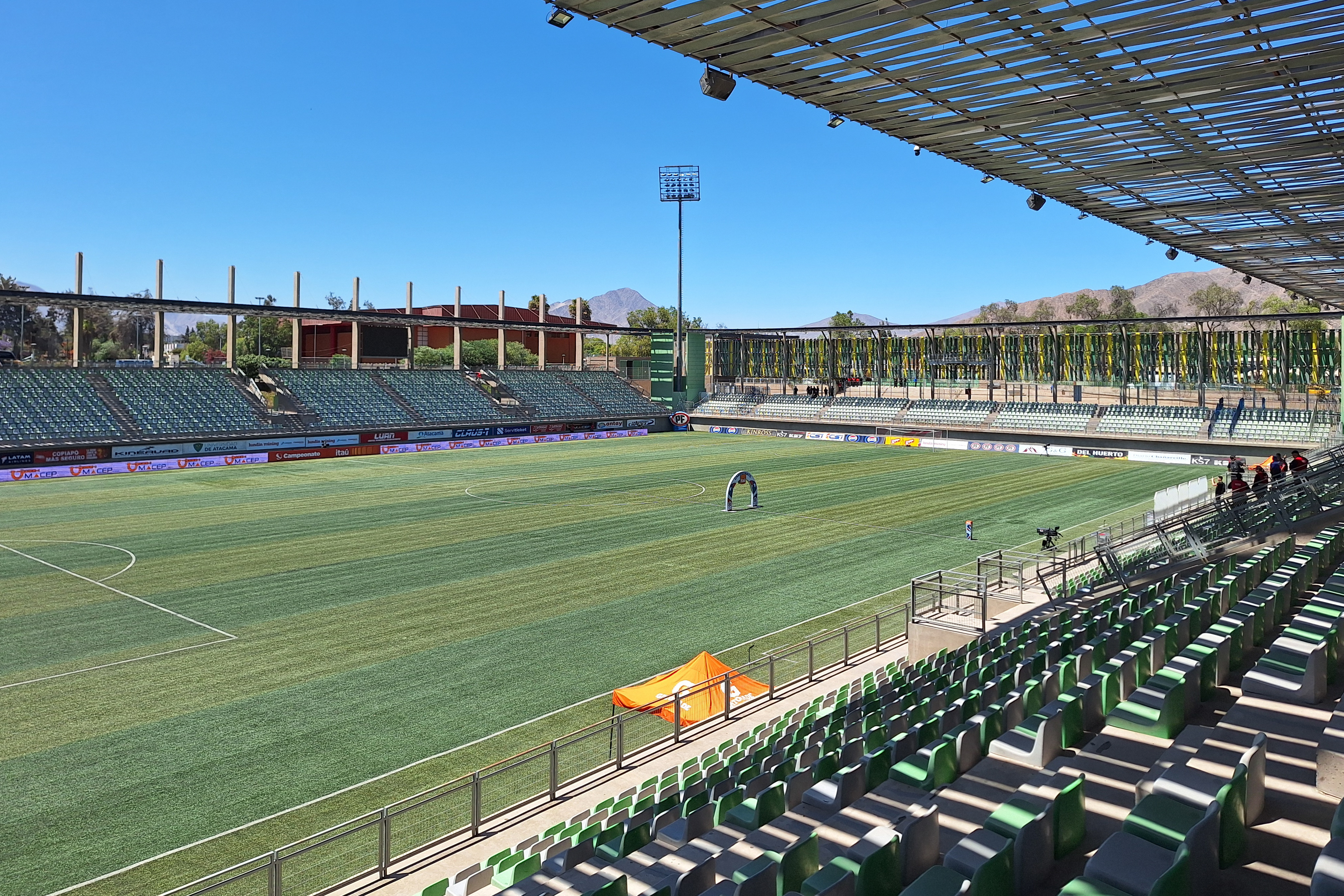
- Interactive map of Estadio Luis Valenzuela Hermosilla
- Full name: Estadio Luis Valenzuela Hermosilla
- Location: Copiapó, Chile
- Capacity: 8,000

Construction
- Opened: 1960
- Renovated: 2009-2011

Tenants
- Regional Atacama (1979-1997); Club de Deportes Copiapó (1998-present)

Estadio Luis Valenzuela Hermosilla is a multi-use stadium in Copiapó, Chile. It is currently used mostly for football matches and is the home ground of Club de Deportes Copiapó of the Chilean Primera División B. It also hosted Regional Atacama of the Chilean Primera División. The stadium has a capacity of 8,000 spectators.
