= Matías Campos López =

Chilean footballer (born 1991)

Personal information
- Full name: Matías Rodrigo Campos López
- Date of birth: 18 August 1991 (age 35)
- Place of birth: Santiago, Chile
- Height: 1.77 m (5 ft 10 in)
- Position: Forward

Team information
- Current team: Unión La Calera

Senior career*
Years	Team	Apps	(Gls)
2009–2017	Audax Italiano	4	(1)
2010–2011	→ Iberia (loan)	–	(–)
2012	Audax Italiano B	23	(15)
2013–2014	→ San Luis (loan)	50	(18)
2014–2015	→ Unión San Felipe (loan)	38	(21)
2015–2016	→ Deportes Temuco (loan)	11	(0)
2016–2017	→ Rangers (loan)	13	(2)
2017	→ Unión San Felipe (loan)	14	(2)
2017	San Marcos	15	(10)
2018	Palestino	27	(14)
2019–2021	Universidad de Chile	8	(1)
2020–2021	→ Palestino (loan)	17	(2)
2021	→ Everton (loan)	9	(1)
2022–2025	Everton	91	(18)
2026–	Unión La Calera	0	(0)
- * Club domestic league appearances and goals as of 31 December 2025

Matías Rodrigo Campos López (born August 18, 1991), usually known as Matías Campos López, is a Chilean footballer who plays for Primera División de Chile side Unión La Calera.

== Career ==
On 30 December 2025, Campos López joined Unión La Calera after five seasons with Everton de Viña del Mar.

== Personal life ==
He is usually named by his two last names, Campos López, to make a difference with his namesake Matías Campos Toro. Both players were with Audax Italiano in his early career and played for Universidad de Chile.

== Honours ==
Palestino

- Copa Chile (1): 2018
