= Matías Campos Toro =

Chilean footballer (born 1989)

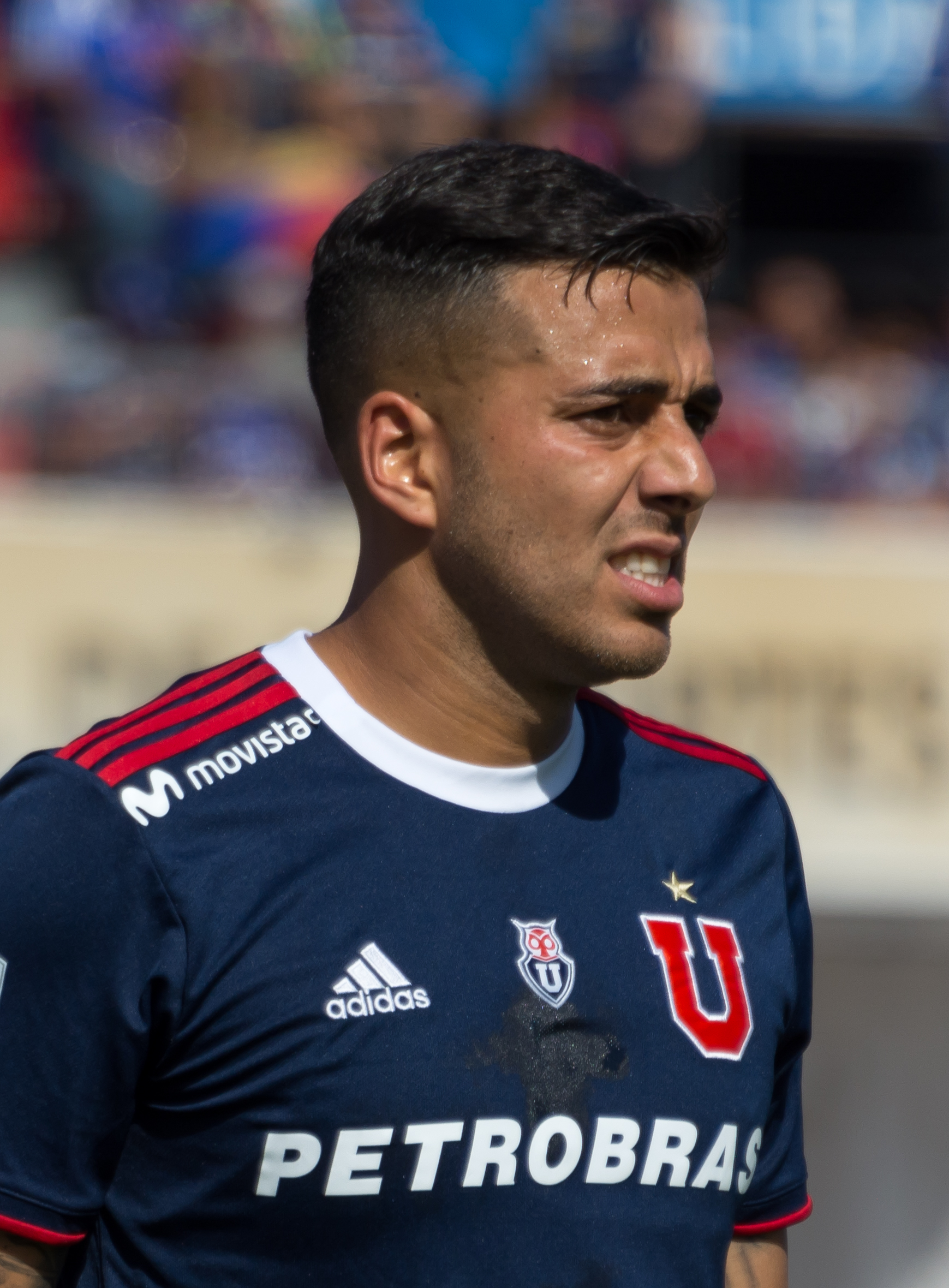
- Campos Toro with Universidad de Chile in 2019.

Personal information
- Full name: Matías Daniel Campos Toro
- Date of birth: 22 June 1989 (age 37)
- Place of birth: Santiago, Chile
- Height: 1.75 m (5 ft 9 in)
- Positions: Left midfielder; left back

Youth career
- 2001–2005: Audax Italiano

Senior career*
Years	Team	Apps	(Gls)
2005–2012	Audax Italiano	126	(22)
2012–2013	Udinese	4	(0)
2012	→ Universidad Católica (loan)	13	(2)
2012–2013	→ Siena (loan)	1	(0)
2013	→ Hércules (loan)	2	(0)
2013–2016	Granada	0	(0)
2014	→ Unión Española (loan)	15	(3)
2015	→ Arsenal de Sarandí (loan)	17	(1)
2016–2018	Audax Italiano	77	(4)
2019	Universidad de Chile	6	(0)
2019	→ Santiago Wanderers (loan)	7	(0)
Total		268	(32)

International career
2008	Chile U18		
2011–2012	Chile	6	(1)
- * Club domestic league appearances and goals

Matías Daniel Campos Toro (Spanish pronunciation: [maˈtias ˈkampos ˈtoro], born 22 June 1989), known as Matías Campos Toro, is a Chilean former footballer who played as left midfielder or left back.

== International career ==
Along with Chile U18 he won the 2008 João Havelange Tournament, scoring in the last game. At senior level, he made six appearances and scored a goal.

=== International goals ===
International appearances and goals
#	Date	Venue	Opponent	Result	Competition	Goal
1	11 November 2011	Estadio Centenario, Montevideo, Uruguay	Uruguay	3–0 Loss	FIFA World Cup qualifier	
2	15 November 2011	Estadio Nacional de Chile, Santiago, Chile	Paraguay	2–0 Win	FIFA World Cup qualifier	1(1)
3	29 February 2012	PPL Park, Chester, Pennsylvania United States	Ghana	1–1 Drawn	Friendly	

== Personal life ==
He is usually named by his two last names, Campos Toro, to make a difference with his namesake Matías Campos López. Both players were with Audax Italiano in his early career and played for Universidad de Chile.

In 2021, Campos Toro was a candidate to councillor for La Florida commune supported by Independent Democratic Union.

== Honours ==
Chile U18

- João Havelange Tournament (1): 2008
