= Lucas Simón =

Argentine-Chilean footballer (born 1986)

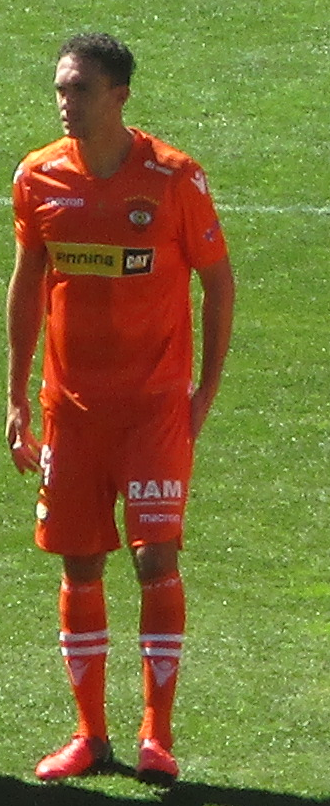
- Lucas Simón with Cobreloa in 2018.

Personal information
- Full name: Lucas Alberto Simón García
- Date of birth: 1 August 1986 (age 40)
- Place of birth: Mar del Plata, Argentina
- Height: 1.83 m (6 ft 0 in)
- Position: Striker

Senior career*
Years	Team	Apps	(Gls)
2003–2004	Cadetes	–	(–)
2004–2006	Nueva Chicago	40	(14)
2006–2011	Piacenza	73	(8)
2008–2009	→ Pescara (loan)	27	(10)
2010–2011	→ Tigre (loan)	4	(0)
2011–2012	Unión La Calera	38	(12)
2012–2013	Palestino	36	(8)
2013–2016	Huachipato	58	(18)
2016	Deportivo Municipal	7	(0)
2017–2019	Cobreloa	77	(41)
2020	Botafogo-PB	7	(4)
2020–2021	Deportes Valdivia	14	(1)
2021	Nueva Chicago	13	(0)
2022	Deportes Recoleta	11	(0)
2022	Trasandino	8	(3)
Total		413	(119)
- * Club domestic league appearances and goals

Lucas Alberto Simón García (born 1 August 1986) is an Argentine naturalized Chilean former professional footballer who played as a striker.

== Club career ==
=== Early career ===
Born in Mar del Plata, Simón started his career at hometown club Cadetes de San Martín. In 2004, he was signed by Primera B Nacional club Nueva Chicago, with whom Simón won the 2006 Clausura Tournament, but lost the championship playoffs against Godoy Cruz. However, despite failing to win the final, he helped his team to earn promotion to the Argentine Primera División, after a 6–3 win against Belgrano, in which Simón scored twice.

=== Piacenza ===
In July 2006, he was signed by Italian Serie B club Piacenza. He scored 5 league goals in the first season, ranked 5th of the team, as the team third strikers, behind Daniele Cacia and Daniele Degano. In the next season, after Cacia was sold (himself remained in Piacenza due to injury), he became the only central forward in the starting XI, but soon the coach preferred Houssine Kharja as the emergency striker, Julien Rantier and Giuseppe Gemiti in supporting role. In mid-October (round 11), he returned to starting XI until Cacia recovered (round 15). In January 2008, Cacia returned to Fiorentina and Kharja was sold, but the club signed Zlatko Dedič (loan) and Alessandro Tulli, made Simón remained as the third striker.

In 2008–09 Serie B season, the club signed Davide Moscardelli as new central forward, and on 1 September 2008, he left the club along with 2 strikers after the club loaned striker Emanuele Ferraro from Salernitana. Which Simón was loaned to Pescara, and he scored 10 goals in Italian third highest division.

On 1 July 2009, Simón returned to Emilia. He had to compete with Tulli, Tomás Guzmán, Antonio Piccolo and Mattia Graffiedi for the remain place of supporting striker role in 4–3–3 formation, or as a backup central forward in 4–4–2 formation if Moscardelli was not available. The coach more frequently used Simone Guerra as supporting striker and Simón only made 8 start, 7 of them before the arrival of striker Edgar Çani in January.

In June 2010, he was loaned back to Argentina for Tigre.

=== Unión La Calera ===
On 10 July 2011, Simón joined to Chilean Primera División club Unión La Calera for play the Clausura Tournament of that season, after of put end to his contract with Piacenza. He netted a twice in his debut against Santiago Morning, scoring all goals of the game in a 2–0 home win. On 17 September, he scored another twice for the team of La Calera, during an incredible 3–0 win over Chilean powerhouse Colo-Colo at Santa Laura. On 2 October, against Palestino, he again scored a goal, after of fail to score after two weeks against Audax Italiano and Unión Española. Simón was a key player in the qualification of his team to the playoffs, scoring on 20 November, two of the three goals of his team against Ñublense, in a 3–1 away victory at Nelson Oyarzún Arenas.

=== Trasandino ===
He signed with Trasandino in the Segunda División Profesional de Chile for the second half of 2022. He retired at the end of the season.

== Post-retirement ==
Following his retirement, Simón returned to his hometown, Mar del Plata, and began to work in football coaching for youth players in the Universo FC academy.

== Personal life ==
In January 2022, he acquired the Chilean nationality by residence, keeping the Argentine nationality.
