= Ricardo Blanco (Argentine footballer) =

Argentine footballer

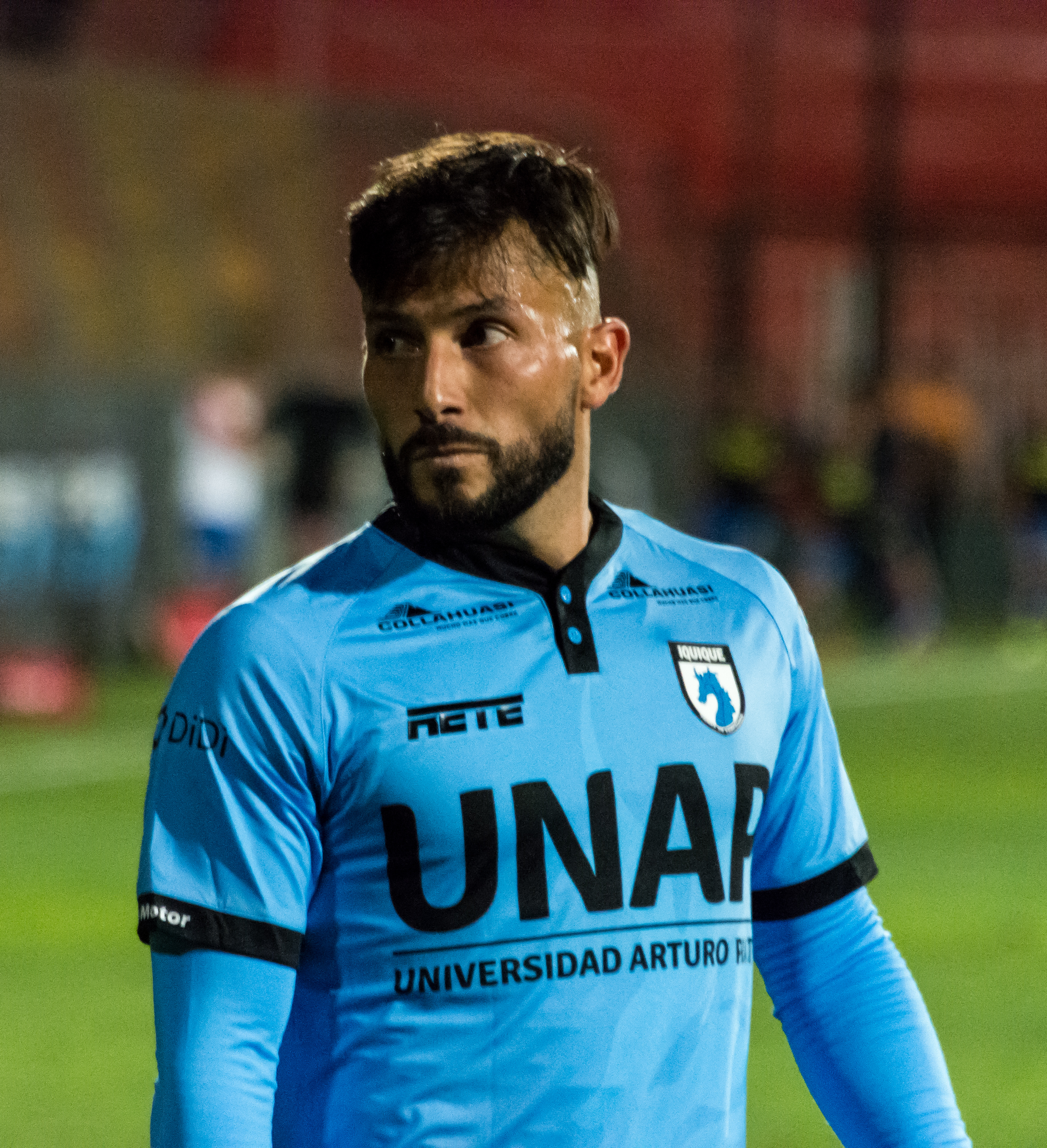

Personal information
- Full name: Ricardo Darío Blanco
- Date of birth: 20 June 1990 (age 36)
- Place of birth: Mar del Plata, Argentina
- Height: 1.63 m (5 ft 4 in)
- Position: Midfielder

Team information
- Current team: All Boys

Senior career*
| Years | Team | Apps | (Gls) |
| 2009–2011 | Deportivo Armenio | | |
| 2015 | Defensores de Belgrano (VR) | 32 | (7) |
| 2016–2017 | All Boys | 34 | (4) |
| 2017 | Qadsia | | |
| 2017 | Instituto | 10 | (2) |
| 2018–2019 | Curicó Unido | 28 | (9) |
| 2019–2021 | Deportes Antofagasta | 23 | (4) |
| 2020 | → Deportes Iquique (loan) | 27 | (1) |
| 2021 | → Rangers (loan) | 13 | (0) |
| 2022–2024 | Chacarita Juniors | 65 | (28) |
| 2024–2025 | Ferro Carril Oeste | 35 | (10) |
| 2025–2026 | Chacarita Juniors | 28 | (1) |
| 2026– | All Boys | 5 | (0) |
- * Club domestic league appearances and goals as of 17:49, 25 March 2026 (UTC)

Ricardo Darío Blanco (born 20 June 1990) is an Argentine footballer who plays for All Boys.

== Career ==
In 2017, Blanco signed for Kuwaiti club Qadsia.
