= Rafael Viotti =

Argentine footballer

Personal information
- Full name: Rafael Armando Viotti
- Date of birth: 15 February 1988 (age 38)
- Place of birth: Buenos Aires, Argentina
- Position: Midfielder

Youth career
- San Telmo

Senior career*
Years	Team	Apps	(Gls)
2004–2006	San Telmo	35	(1)
2006–2009	Argentinos Juniors	11	(0)
2009–2010	Aldosivi	11	(0)
2011–2013	San Telmo	32	(9)
2013–2014	Tristán Suárez	35	(7)
2014–2015	San Luis	35	(13)
2015–2016	Everton	34	(12)
2016–2017	Deportes La Serena	18	(4)
2017	Unión La Calera	14	(8)
2018	Santiago Wanderers	25	(8)
2019	Cobreloa	17	(3)
2020–2021	Deportivo Cuenca	19	(7)
2021	San Marcos	27	(2)
2022	Mitre SdE	3	(0)
Total		316	(74)
- * Club domestic league appearances and goals

Rafael Armando Viotti (born 15 February 1988, in Buenos Aires, Argentina) is an Argentine former professional footballer who played as a midfielder.

== Career ==
Viotti stood out in Chilean football playing for San Luis de Quillota, Everton, Deportes La Serena, Unión La Calera, Santiago Wanderers, Cobreloa and San Marcos de Arica.

His last club was Mitre in his homeland.
