= Estadio Municipal Lucio Fariña Fernández =

Stadium in Quillota, Chile

Coordinates: 32.8876°S 71.252°W

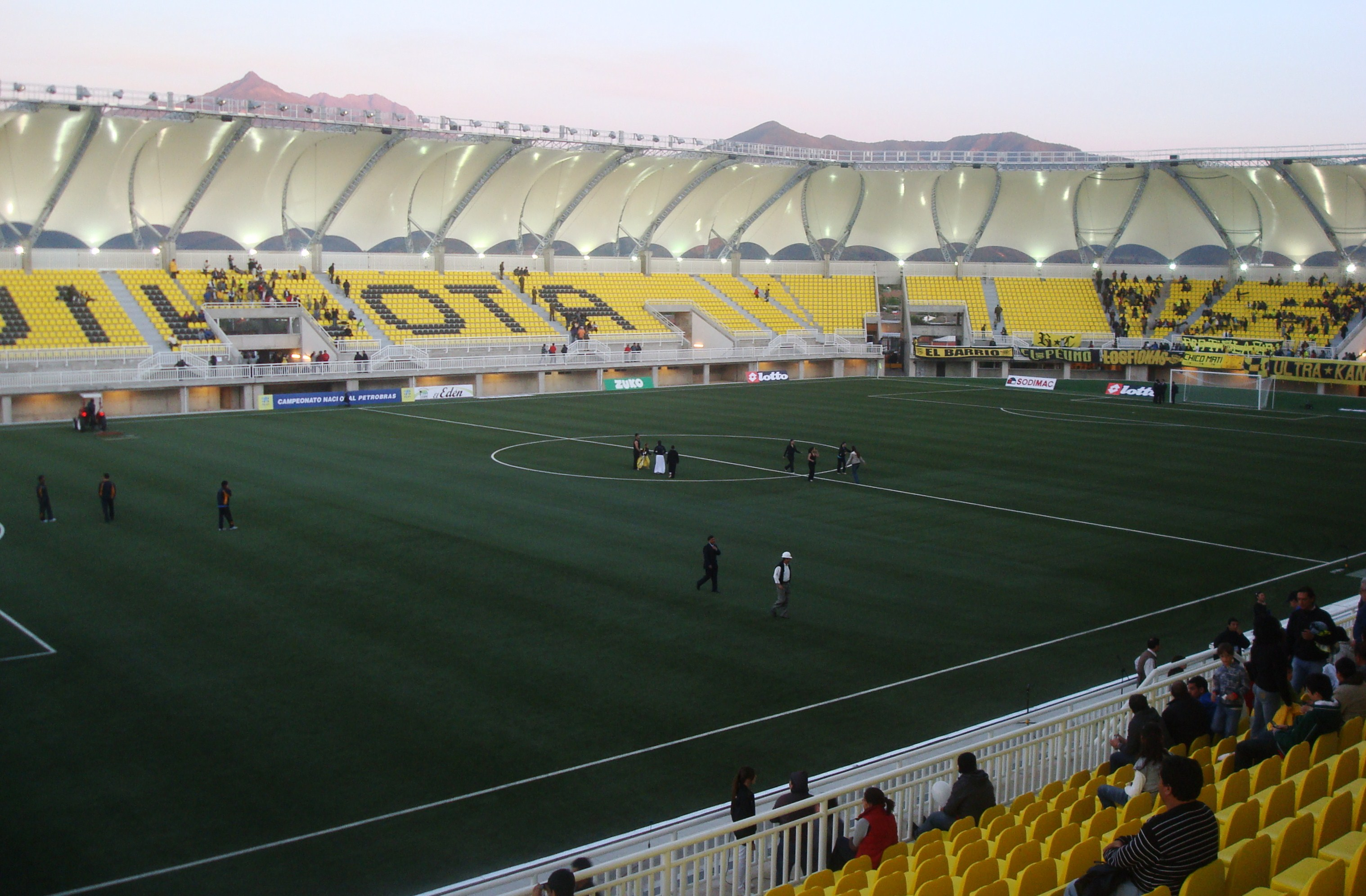
- Interactive map of Estadio Municipal Lucio Fariña Fernández
- Full name: Estadio Municipal Lucio Fariña Fernández
- Location: Quillota, Chile
- Owner: Municipality of Quillota
- Capacity: 7,680

Construction
- Built: 2010
- Opened: September 15, 2010

Tenant
- San Luis

Estadio Municipal Lucio Fariña Fernández is a multi-use stadium in Quillota, Chile. It is currently used mostly for football matches, and is the home stadium of San Luis which currently plays at the second tier of the Chilean league system. The stadium holds 7,680 spectators. The stadium was opened on September 15, 2010 in a San Luis against Universidad de Concepcion, match which ended in a final 1-0 for the home team.

== See also ==
List of football stadiums in Chile
