= Independiente de Cauquenes =

Chilean football club

- Full name: Club de Deportes Independiente de Cauquenes S.A.D.P.
- Founded: March 4, 1929
- Ground: Fiscal Manuel Moya Medel; Cauquenes, Chile
- Capacity: 3,000
- Chairman: Franco García
- Manager: Yuri Fernández
- League: Segunda División
- 2021: 4th
- Website: http://www.independientedecauquenes.cl/
Home colours	Away colours

Club de Deportes Independiente de Cauquenes, more commonly known as CD Independiente, is a Chilean Football club, their home town is Cauquenes, Chile. They currently play in the third level of Chilean football, the Segunda División de Chile.

The club were founded on March 4, 1929 and participated for 10 years in Primera B, 10 years in Tercera División A, 2 years in Tercera División B, And currently plays in the Segunda División de Chile, due to that achieved the ascent as a champion of the Tercera División A 2015.

== Seasons played ==
- 10 seasons in Primera B
- 5 season in Segunda División
- 10 seasons in Tercera División A
- 2 seasons in Tercera B

== Honours ==
- Tercera División: 1

2015

- Tercera B: 1

2013

- Campeonato Amateur de Clubes Campeones: 1

1990

== Current squad 2022 ==
Note: Flags indicate national team as defined under FIFA eligibility rules; some limited exceptions apply. Players may hold more than one non-FIFA nationality.

No.	Pos.	Nation	Player
1	GK	CHI	Carlos Julio
2	DF	CHI	Felipe Ramos
3	DF	CHI	Luciano Araya
5	DF	CHI	Gonzalo Mosquera
6	MF	PAR	Freddy Coronel
7	MF	CHI	Felipe Escobar
8	MF	CHI	Luciano Cisterna
9	FW	CHI	Mauricio Godoy
10	MF	CHI	Álex Díaz
11	MF	CHI	Cristian Monsalve
12	GK	CHI	Ricardo Cárcamo
13	FW	CHI	Diego Vallejos
14	DF	CHI	Tomás González
15	DF	CHI	Javier Guzmán

No.	Pos.	Nation	Player
16	FW	CHI	Sebastián Villalobos
17	DF	CHI	Pablo Cabrera
18	FW	CHI	Matías Pinto
19	MF	CHI	Ariel Salinas
20	MF	CHI	Óskar Méndez
21	DF	CHI	Cristian Aguirre
22	MF	CHI	Marcelo Téllez
23	FW	PAR	Alejandro Arce
25	GK	CHI	Adán Silvestre
26	DF	CHI	Cegy Durán
27	MF	CHI	Óscar Aravena
29	MF	CHI	Benjamín Lagos
30	MF	CHI	Joaquín Navarro

== See also ==
- Chilean football league system
