= 2019 Copa Chile =

Copa Chile MTS

Tournament details
- Country: Chile
- Dates: 23 March 2019 – 22 January 2020
- Teams: 48

Final positions
- Champions: Colo-Colo (12th title)
- Runners-up: Universidad de Chile
- Copa Libertadores: Universidad de Chile

Tournament statistics
- Matches played: 74
- Goals scored: 193 (2.61 per match)
- Top goal scorer(s): Javier Parraguez (5 goals)

The 2019 Copa Chile (officially known as Copa Chile MTS 2019 due to its sponsorship), was the 40th edition of the Copa Chile, the country's national football cup tournament. Palestino were the defending champions, but were knocked out of the competition by Santiago Morning in the second round. Colo-Colo were the champions, defeating Universidad de Chile 2–1 in the final.

== Format ==
The 2019 Copa Chile was based on a system of direct elimination with double-legged ties, similar to the Copa del Rey. Clubs that were members of the Segunda División Profesional and ANFA were included in the competition, same as the previous edition, and played against the Primera B clubs for 16 berths to the second round, where the winners faced the 16 Primera División clubs which joined the competition in that round.

== Prizes ==
The champions of this edition (or the runners-up, if the champions had already qualified) were entitled to earn the right to compete in the 2020 Copa Libertadores, taking the Chile 4 berth, and also earned the right to play the 2020 Supercopa de Chile against the 2019 Campeonato Nacional champions.

== Schedule ==
Round	Draw date	First leg	Second leg
First Round	14 March 2019	23–24 March 2019	
Second Round	8 May 2019	30 May – 9 June 2019	5 June – 10 July 2019
Round of 16	14 June 2019	13–16 July 2019	20 July – 4 September 2019
Quarterfinals	14 June 2019	7–8 September 2019	11–12 October 2019
Semifinals	14 June 2019	17–18 January 2020	
Final	14 June 2019	22 January 2020	

== Teams ==
48 clubs took part in this edition of the Copa Chile: 16 from the Primera División, 16 from the Primera B, 11 from the Segunda División Profesional and 5 invitees from the Tercera División A.

=== Primera A ===
- Audax Italiano
- Cobresal
- Colo-Colo
- Coquimbo Unido
- Curicó Unido
- Deportes Antofagasta
- Deportes Iquique
- Everton
- Huachipato
- O'Higgins
- Palestino
- Unión Española
- Unión La Calera
- Universidad Católica
- Universidad de Chile
- Universidad de Concepción

=== Primera B ===
- Barnechea
- Cobreloa
- Deportes Copiapó
- Deportes La Serena
- Deportes Melipilla
- Deportes Puerto Montt
- Deportes Santa Cruz
- Deportes Temuco
- Deportes Valdivia
- Magallanes
- Ñublense
- Rangers
- San Luis
- Santiago Morning
- Santiago Wanderers
- Unión San Felipe

=== Segunda División ===
- Colchagua
- Deportes Colina
- Deportes Recoleta
- Deportes Vallenar
- Fernández Vial
- General Velásquez
- Iberia
- Independiente (Cauquenes)
- Lautaro de Buin
- San Antonio Unido
- San Marcos de Arica

=== Tercera A ===
- Deportes Concepción
- Deportes Rengo
- Pilmahue
- Provincial Osorno
- Trasandino

== Preliminary phases ==
=== First round ===
The pairings for the first round were announced by the ANFP on 14 March 2019. The 16 teams from the Segunda División and Tercera División A were drawn against the 16 Primera B teams, according to geographical and safety criteria. Unlike the previous edition, ties in this round were single-legged, with the team from the lower tier hosting the match. Matches in this round were played on 23 and 24 March 2019.

23 March 2019	Deportes Colina	1–3	Santiago Morning	Lo Barnechea, Santiago
17:30	Julio 49'	Report	Contreras 7'; Gatica 59'; Reyes 63'	Stadium: Municipal de Lo Barnechea; Referee: Cristian Droguett

23 March 2019	Deportes Rengo	2–3	Barnechea	Rengo
17:30	Rojas 55'; González 69'	Report	Arriagada 46'; Díaz 53'; Luttecke 74' (pen.)	Stadium: Municipal Guillermo Guzmán Díaz; Referee: Nicolás Zamorano

23 March 2019	Trasandino	0–0 (4–1 p)	San Luis	Los Andes
17:30		Report		Stadium: Regional de Los Andes; Referee: Claudio Cevasco
	Penalties
	Pino (penalty scored); Fariña (penalty scored); Arias (penalty scored); Novoa (penalty scored)		Parada (penalty scored); Sandoval (penalty missed); Escobar (penalty missed)

23 March 2019	San Antonio Unido	1–2	Deportes La Serena	Cartagena
17:30	Díaz 8'	Report	Bayk 24'; Rivera 41'	Stadium: Municipal de Cartagena; Referee: Felipe Jara

23 March 2019	Iberia	1–2	Ñublense	Los Ángeles
18:00	Díaz 71'	Report	Escalante 31'; Valdivia 75'	Stadium: Municipal de Los Ángeles; Referee: Fernando Vejar

23 March 2019	Deportes Vallenar	2–1	Deportes Copiapó	Vallenar
18:00	Córdova 58', 72'	Report	Puchetta 81'	Stadium: Municipal Nelson Rojas; Referee: Nicolás Medina

23 March 2019	Fernández Vial	2–2 (2–3 p)	Deportes Temuco	Concepción
20:00	Vásquez 4'; Ortega 78'	Report	Taiva 42'; Requena 90+2'	Stadium: Ester Roa; Referee: Nicolás Gamboa
	Penalties
	Parry (penalty scored); Salas (penalty scored); Valle (penalty missed); Vásquez (penalty missed); Navarrete (penalty missed)		Aros (penalty missed); Domínguez (penalty missed); Castro (penalty scored); Taiva (penalty scored); Espinoza (penalty scored)

24 March 2019	Provincial Osorno	1–3	Deportes Puerto Montt	Valdivia
12:00	Lecaros 51' (pen.)	Report	Rebolledo 15'; Barroilhet 45'; Lemmo 72'	Stadium: Parque Municipal; Referee: Patricio Blanca

24 March 2019	Deportes Recoleta	0–0 (6–7 p)	Unión San Felipe	Recoleta, Santiago
17:30		Report		Stadium: Municipal de Recoleta; Referee: Rodrigo Carvajal

24 March 2019	San Marcos de Arica	3–1	Cobreloa	Arica
17:30	Godoy 20'; Vilches 63' (pen.), 90+3'	Report	Mundaca 79'	Stadium: Carlos Dittborn; Referee: Miguel Araos

24 March 2019	Lautaro de Buin	0–3	Deportes Melipilla	San Bernardo
17:30		Report	Sánchez 31' (o.g.); Sepúlveda 62'; Sosa 77'	Stadium: Municipal Luis Navarro Avilés; Referee: Diego Vidal

24 March 2019	General Velásquez	1–4	Magallanes	San Vicente
17:30	Donadell 67'	Report	Jones 14'; Huerta 49'; Pinto 54'; Becica 73' (pen.)	Stadium: Municipal Augusto Rodríguez; Referee: Cristian Galaz

24 March 2019	Colchagua	1–1 (4–5 p)	Deportes Santa Cruz	San Fernando
17:30	Riveros 63'	Report	Urquieta 86'	Stadium: Municipal Jorge Silva; Referee: Víctor Abarzúa

24 March 2019	Independiente (Cauquenes)	2–2 (3–5 p)	Rangers	Cauquenes
17:30	Torres 30'; Lara 42'	Report	Ríos 6'; Fritz 78'	Stadium: Miguel Alarcón Osores; Referee: Manuel Vergara

24 March 2019	Pilmahue	0–2	Deportes Valdivia	Villarrica
17:30		Report	Ibáñez 59'; Ojeda 88'	Stadium: Municipal Matías Vidal; Referee: Cristián Andaur

24 March 2019	Deportes Concepción	1–4	Santiago Wanderers	Concepción
17:30	Reyes 59'	Report	Gutiérrez 8', 47'; Castro 10'; Marín 61'	Stadium: Ester Roa; Attendance: 12,958; Referee: Juan Lara

=== Second round ===
The 16 Primera División teams entered the competition at this stage, and were drawn against the 16 first round winners. In each tie, the team from the lower tier hosted the first leg. The pairings for the second round were announced by the ANFP on 8 May 2019, the first legs were played from 30 May to 9 June 2019 and the second legs were played from 5 June to 10 July 2019.

Team 1	Agg.	Team 2	1st leg	2nd leg
San Marcos de Arica	0–4	Deportes Iquique	0–2	0–2
Santiago Wanderers	2–5	Audax Italiano	1–2	1–3
Deportes Temuco	3–2	Huachipato	2–1	1–1
Barnechea	3–3 (4–3 p)	Deportes Antofagasta	1–2	2–1
Palestino	1–4	Santiago Morning	0–3	1–1
Rangers	1–3	Universidad de Chile	0–2	1–1
Deportes Melipilla	0–0 (3–4 p)	Unión Española	0–0	0–0
Deportes Santa Cruz	4–6	O'Higgins	3–2	1–4
Deportes Puerto Montt	4–4 (3–4 p)	Colo-Colo	2–0	2–4
Ñublense	2–2 (4–2 p)	Curicó Unido	0–1	2–1
Magallanes	2–5	Unión La Calera	0–2	2–3
Deportes La Serena	2–2 (5–6 p)	Universidad Católica	1–0	1–2
Unión San Felipe	4–2	Coquimbo Unido	3–1	1–1
Trasandino	0–2	Everton	0–1	0–1
Deportes Valdivia	1–1 (5–3 p)	Universidad de Concepción	0–0	1–1
Deportes Vallenar	1–3	Cobresal	1–0	0–3

Notes

1. Order of legs reversed after original draw.
2. ANFP awarded a 3–0 win in favour of Santiago Morning after Palestino only fielded one U-20 player instead of two, as stated by the tournament's regulations. The original result was a 4–3 win for Palestino.

==== First leg ====
30 May 2019	San Marcos de Arica	0–2	Deportes Iquique	Arica
21:00		Report	Donoso 11', 72'	Stadium: Carlos Dittborn; Attendance: 3,500; Referee: Francisco Gilabert

5 June 2019	Palestino	0–3; Awarded	Santiago Morning	La Cisterna, Santiago
15:30	Guerrero 29'; Tarifeño 68', 69'; Véjar 90+3'	Report	Ortega 10', 79', 85'	Stadium: Municipal de La Cisterna; Referee: José Cabero

8 June 2019	Rangers	0–2	Universidad de Chile	Talca
15:00		Report	Oroz 36', 41'	Stadium: Fiscal; Attendance: 7,334; Referee: César Deischler

8 June 2019	Trasandino	0–1	Everton	Los Andes
15:00		Report	Orellana 80'	Stadium: Regional de Los Andes; Referee: Fernando Vejar

8 June 2019	Magallanes	0–2	Unión La Calera	San Bernardo
15:30		Report	Bou 36'; Cáceres 51'	Stadium: Municipal Luis Navarro Avilés; Referee: Rafael Troncoso

8 June 2019	Deportes Melipilla	0–0	Unión Española	Melipilla
15:30		Report		Stadium: Municipal Roberto Bravo Santibáñez; Referee: Claudio Aranda

8 June 2019	Santiago Wanderers	1–2	Audax Italiano	Viña del Mar
17:30	Luna 20'	Report	Jeraldino 16'; Holgado 62'	Stadium: Sausalito; Attendance: 5,888; Referee: Fabián Aracena

8 June 2019	Deportes Santa Cruz	3–2	O'Higgins	Santa Cruz
18:00	Pontigo 7', 52'; González 11'	Report	Muñoz 71'; Salas 90+1'	Stadium: Municipal Joaquín Muñoz García; Referee: Felipe Jara

8 June 2019	Deportes Vallenar	1–0	Cobresal	Vallenar
16:00	Ramírez 22'	Report		Stadium: Municipal Nelson Rojas; Referee: Gustavo Ahumada

8 June 2019	Deportes La Serena	1–0	Universidad Católica	La Serena
20:00	Huerta 42' (o.g.)	Report		Stadium: La Portada; Attendance: 5,032; Referee: Francisco Gilabert

9 June 2019	Barnechea	1–2	Deportes Antofagasta	Lo Barnechea, Santiago
12:00	Urbina 56'	Report	Figueroa 4'; Bello 80' (pen.)	Stadium: Municipal de Lo Barnechea; Referee: Cristián Andaur

9 June 2019	Deportes Temuco	2–1	Huachipato	Temuco
12:30	Taiva 1'; Castro 76'	Report	Sepúlveda 19' (pen.)	Stadium: Municipal Germán Becker; Attendance: 3,459; Referee: Nicolás Gamboa

9 June 2019	Deportes Puerto Montt	2–0	Colo-Colo	Puerto Montt
15:00	Souper 4'; Lemmo 54'	Report		Stadium: Regional de Chinquihue; Referee: Juan Lara

9 June 2019	Unión San Felipe	3–1	Coquimbo Unido	Quillota
15:00	Palacios 7'; Orellana 13', 39'	Report	Salas 49'	Stadium: Municipal Lucio Fariña Fernández; Referee: José Cabero

9 June 2019	Ñublense	0–1	Curicó Unido	Chillán
15:30		Report	Bustamante 47'	Stadium: Municipal Nelson Oyarzún Arenas; Referee: Cristián Droguett

9 June 2019	Deportes Valdivia	0–0	Universidad de Concepción	Valdivia
16:00		Report		Stadium: Parque Municipal; Referee: Patricio Blanca

==== Second leg ====
5 June 2019	Deportes Iquique	2–0 (4–0 agg.)	San Marcos de Arica	Iquique
15:30	Donoso 23' (pen.); Castro 52'	Report		Stadium: Municipal de Cavancha; Referee: Nicolás Gamboa

9 June 2019	Santiago Morning	1–1 (4–1 agg.)	Palestino	La Pintana, Santiago
15:30	Ortega 76'	Report	Jorquera 43'	Stadium: Municipal de La Pintana; Referee: Ángelo Hermosilla

11 June 2019	Audax Italiano	3–1 (5–2 agg.)	Santiago Wanderers	La Florida, Santiago
18:00	Holgado 13'; Jeraldino 29' (pen.); Henríquez 86'	Report	Gutiérrez 80'	Stadium: Bicentenario de La Florida; Referee: José Cabero

12 June 2019	Universidad de Chile	1–1 (3–1 agg.)	Rangers	Ñuñoa, Santiago
18:15	Henríquez 67'	Report	Ríos 4'	Stadium: Nacional Julio Martínez Prádanos; Referee: Juan Lara

12 June 2019	Universidad de Concepción	1–1 (1–1 agg.) (3–5 p)	Deportes Valdivia	Concepción
19:00	Orellana 77'	Report	Vidangossy 35'	Stadium: Ester Roa; Referee: Cristián Droguett
	Penalties
	Figueroa (penalty scored); Rolín (penalty scored); Orellana (penalty scored); Portillo (penalty missed)		(penalty scored) Pino; (penalty scored) Opazo; (penalty scored) Ibáñez; (penalty scored) Jelves; (penalty scored) Pol

12 June 2019	O'Higgins	4–1 (6–4 agg.)	Deportes Santa Cruz	Rancagua
19:30	Muñoz 20', 43'; Magalhães 49'; Fernández 71'	Report	Collao 88'	Stadium: El Teniente; Referee: Nicolás Gamboa

12 June 2019	Curicó Unido	1–2 (2–2 agg.) (2–4 p)	Ñublense	Curicó
19:30	Parra 33'	Report	Pérez 40', 46'	Stadium: La Granja; Attendance: 2,203; Referee: Cristián Andaur
	Penalties
	Bustamante (penalty missed); Cortés (penalty scored); Quiroga (penalty scored); Opazo (penalty missed)		(penalty scored) Valdivia; (penalty scored) Vargas; (penalty scored) Corro; (penalty scored) Molina

13 June 2019	Deportes Antofagasta	1–2 (3–3 agg.) (3–4 p)	Barnechea	Antofagasta
16:00	Bello 36'	Report	Arguinarena 58'; Sanhueza 72'	Stadium: Bicentenario Calvo y Bascuñán; Referee: Felipe Jara
	Penalties
	Bello (penalty scored); Figueroa (penalty scored); Flores (penalty scored); Romo (penalty missed); Blanco (penalty missed); Ampuero (penalty missed)		(penalty scored) Oyarzo; (penalty missed) Arriagada; (penalty missed) Rencoret; (penalty scored) Ortiz; (penalty scored) Díaz; (penalty scored) Arguinarena

13 June 2019	Unión La Calera	3–2 (5–2 agg.)	Magallanes	La Calera
17:30	Andia 26'; Bou 35', 60'	Report	Vicuña 12'; Leal 43'	Stadium: Municipal Nicolás Chahuán Nazar; Referee: Patricio Blanca

13 June 2019	Coquimbo Unido	1–1 (2–4 agg.)	Unión San Felipe	Coquimbo
19:30	Zavala 72'	Report	Cisterna 7'	Stadium: Municipal Francisco Sánchez Rumoroso; Referee: Gustavo Ahumada

13 June 2019	Colo-Colo	4–2 (4–4 agg.) (5–3 p)	Deportes Puerto Montt	Macul, Santiago
15:00	Mouche 11'; Parraguez 30', 82'; Bolados 84'	Report	Bustamante 2'; Lemmo 17'	Stadium: Monumental David Arellano; Referee: César Deischler
	Penalties
	Zaldivia (penalty scored); Insaurralde (penalty scored); Provoste (penalty scored); Vilches (penalty scored); Parraguez (penalty scored)		(penalty scored) Lemmo; (penalty scored) Gauna; (penalty missed) Barroilhet; (penalty scored) Baeza

6 July 2019	Everton	1–0 (2–0 agg.)	Trasandino	Viña del Mar
19:00	Cuevas 55'	Report		Stadium: Sausalito; Referee: Christian Rojas

7 July 2019	Huachipato	1–1 (2–3 agg.)	Deportes Temuco	Talcahuano
12:00	Valenzuela 80'	Report	Castro 90+4' (pen.)	Stadium: Estadio CAP; Referee: Rafael Troncoso

9 July 2019	Cobresal	3–0 (3–1 agg.)	Deportes Vallenar	El Salvador
15:00	Muñoz 11'; Gutiérrez 34'; González 90+1' (pen.)	Report		Stadium: El Cobre; Referee: Claudio Aranda

9 July 2019	Universidad Católica	2–1 (2–2 agg.) (6–5 p)	Deportes La Serena	Las Condes, Santiago
20:00	Sáez 39', 65'	Report	Ruiz 78'	Stadium: San Carlos de Apoquindo; Referee: Felipe González
	Penalties
	Aued (penalty scored); Buonanotte (penalty scored); Fuenzalida (penalty scored); Puch (penalty scored); Pinares (penalty scored); Dituro (penalty scored)		(penalty scored) Medel; (penalty scored) Ruiz; (penalty scored) Gómez; (penalty scored) Hormazábal; (penalty scored) J. Silva; (penalty missed) Rivera

10 July 2019	Unión Española	0–0 (0–0 agg.) (4–3 p)	Deportes Melipilla	Independencia, Santiago
20:00		Report		Stadium: Santa Laura; Referee: Cristian Droguett
	Penalties
	Dávila (penalty scored); Caballero (penalty scored); Pavez (penalty scored); González (penalty missed); Sánchez (penalty scored)		(penalty missed) Meneses; (penalty scored) Leiva; (penalty missed) Sanhueza; (penalty scored) Barrera; (penalty scored) Sepúlveda

== Bracket ==
Round of 16
6	Audax Italiano	0	1	1
15	Unión San Felipe	0	0	0
7	Unión Española	0	2	2
14	Deportes Valdivia	0	0	0
1	Deportes Iquique	1	1	2
8	Cobresal	1	3	4
9	Deportes Temuco	0	0	0
11	Universidad de Chile	1	2	3
2	Colo-Colo	3	3	6
3	Barnechea	0	0	0
4	Everton	1	1	2
5	O'Higgins	0	1	1
10	Unión La Calera	1	1	2 (5)
16	Ñublense	1	1	2 (4)
12	Santiago Morning	0	1	1
13	Universidad Católica	2	3	5

Quarterfinals
6	Audax Italiano	0	1	1
7	Unión Española	1	2	3
8	Cobresal	3	1	4
11	Universidad de Chile	1	4	5
2	Colo-Colo	2	2	4
4	Everton	1	1	2
10	Unión La Calera	2	0	2
13	Universidad Católica	1	2	3

Semifinals
7	Unión Española	0	—	0
11	Universidad de Chile (awd.)	3	—	3
2	Colo-Colo (p)	1	—	1 (4)
13	Universidad Católica	1	—	1 (2)

Final
11	Universidad de Chile	1
2	Colo-Colo	2

== Final phases ==
=== Round of 16 ===
The draw for the Round of 16 and subsequent phases was held on 14 June 2019. Starting from this round, the order of legs in each tie will depend on the number assigned to each second round winner, with the team with the highest number in each tie hosting the second leg. The first legs were played on 13–14 and 16 July 2019, and the second legs were played on 20–21 July, 7 August, and 4 September 2019.

Team 1	Agg.	Team 2	1st leg	2nd leg
Deportes Temuco	0–3	Universidad de Chile	0–1	0–2
Deportes Iquique	2–4	Cobresal	1–1	1–3
Unión Española	2–0	Deportes Valdivia	0–0	2–0
Audax Italiano	1–0	Unión San Felipe	0–0	1–0
Colo-Colo	6–0	Barnechea	3–0	3–0
Everton	2–1	O'Higgins	1–0	1–1
Unión La Calera	2–2 (5–4 p)	Ñublense	1–1	1–1
Santiago Morning	1–5	Universidad Católica	0–2	1–3

==== First leg ====
13 July 2019	Everton	1–0	O'Higgins	Viña del Mar
17:30	Freitas 66'	Report		Stadium: Sausalito; Referee: Cristian Garay

13 July 2019	Unión Española	0–0	Deportes Valdivia	Independencia, Santiago
17:30		Report		Stadium: Santa Laura; Referee: Cristian Andaur

13 July 2019	Audax Italiano	0–0	Unión San Felipe	La Florida, Santiago
20:00		Report		Stadium: Bicentenario de La Florida; Referee: Fabián Aracena

14 July 2019	Deportes Iquique	1–1	Cobresal	Iquique
12:00	Barbieri 59'	Report	Reynero 34'	Stadium: Municipal de Cavancha; Referee: Nicolás Gamboa

14 July 2019	Deportes Temuco	0–1	Universidad de Chile	Temuco
15:30		Report	Rodríguez 38'	Stadium: Municipal Germán Becker; Referee: Ángelo Hermosilla

14 July 2019	Unión La Calera	1–1	Ñublense	La Calera
17:30	Larrondo 67'	Report	Pérez 63'	Stadium: Municipal Nicolás Chahuán Nazar; Referee: Felipe González

14 July 2019	Colo-Colo	3–0	Barnechea	Macul, Santiago
20:00	Costa 33', 56', 70'	Report		Stadium: Monumental David Arellano; Referee: Julio Bascuñán

16 July 2019	Santiago Morning	0–2	Universidad Católica	Ñuñoa, Santiago
16:00		Report	Kuscevic 85'; Huerta 90+4'	Stadium: Nacional Julio Martínez Prádanos; Referee: Piero Maza

==== Second leg ====
20 July 2019	Unión San Felipe	0–1 (0–1 agg.)	Audax Italiano	San Felipe
12:30		Report	Torres 23'	Stadium: Municipal de San Felipe; Referee: Juan Lara

20 July 2019	Universidad de Chile	2–0 (3–0 agg.)	Deportes Temuco	Ñuñoa, Santiago
15:00	Guerra 9', 67'	Report		Stadium: Nacional Julio Martínez Prádanos; Referee: Cristián Garay

20 July 2019	Cobresal	3–1 (4–2 agg.)	Deportes Iquique	El Salvador
15:00	Muñoz 11'; Reynero 45'; Bugueño 66'	Report	Fernández 27'	Stadium: El Cobre; Referee: Cristián Droguett

20 July 2019	O'Higgins	1–1 (1–2 agg.)	Everton	Rancagua
17:30	López 43'	Report	Ceratto 56'	Stadium: El Teniente; Referee: Eduardo Gamboa

21 July 2019	Barnechea	0–3 (0–6 agg.)	Colo-Colo	Ñuñoa, Santiago
12:00		Report	Parraguez 29'; Villanueva 70'; Morales 83'	Stadium: Nacional Julio Martínez Prádanos; Referee: José Cabero

21 July 2019	Ñublense	1–1 (2–2 agg.) (4–5 p)	Unión La Calera	Chillán
15:00	Acuña 81'	Report	Rojas 42'	Stadium: Municipal Nelson Oyarzún Arenas; Referee: Roberto Tobar
	Penalties
	Valdivia (penalty scored); Vargas (penalty scored); Faúndez (penalty scored); Díaz (penalty scored); Pinto (penalty missed)		(penalty scored) Alvarado; (penalty scored) Cáceres; (penalty scored) Isnaldo; (penalty scored) Leyton; (penalty scored) Bou

7 August 2019	Universidad Católica	3–1 (5–1 agg.)	Santiago Morning	Las Condes, Santiago
20:00	Vargas 3'; Sáez 85'; Buonanotte 90+1'	Report	Gómez 22'	Stadium: San Carlos de Apoquindo; Referee: Ángelo Hermosilla
Note: The match was originally scheduled on 21 June at 18:30 but was suspended due to bad weather and the poor state of the pitch at Estadio San Carlos de Apoquindo. It was rescheduled to 7 August at 20:00.

4 September 2019	Deportes Valdivia	0–2 (0–2 agg.)	Unión Española	Valdivia
19:00		Report	Llanos 53'; Arace 81'	Stadium: Parque Municipal; Referee: Francisco Gilabert
Note: The match was originally scheduled on 20 June at 16:00 but was suspended due to bad weather and the poor state of the pitch at Estadio Parque Municipal. It was rescheduled to 4 September at 19:00.

=== Quarterfinals ===
Team 1	Agg.	Team 2	1st leg	2nd leg
Cobresal	4–5	Universidad de Chile	3–1	1–4
Audax Italiano	1–3	Unión Española	0–1	1–2
Colo-Colo	4–2	Everton	2–1	2–1
Unión La Calera	2–3	Universidad Católica	2–1	0–2

==== First leg ====
7 September 2019	Cobresal	3–1	Universidad de Chile	El Salvador
15:00	Villagra 12', 50'; Reynero 35'	Report	Riquelme 19'	Stadium: El Cobre; Referee: Ángelo Hermosilla

7 September 2019	Colo-Colo	2–1	Everton	Macul, Santiago
17:30	Paredes 60' (pen.); Velásquez 73' (o.g.)	Report	Sánchez 45+3'	Stadium: Monumental David Arellano; Referee: Felipe González

8 September 2019	Unión La Calera	2–1	Universidad Católica	La Calera
15:00	Leiva 1'; Larrondo 8'	Report	Sáez 38'	Stadium: Municipal Nicolás Chahuán Nazar; Referee: César Deischler

8 September 2019	Audax Italiano	0–1	Unión Española	La Florida, Santiago
17:30		Report	Aránguiz 25'	Stadium: Bicentenario de La Florida; Referee: Christian Rojas

==== Second leg ====
11 October 2019	Universidad de Chile	4–1 (5–4 agg.)	Cobresal	Ñuñoa, Santiago
20:00	Benegas 9'; Henríquez 36'; Rodríguez 83'; Riquelme 89'	Report	Cañete 70'	Stadium: Nacional Julio Martínez Prádanos; Referee: Juan Lara

12 October 2019	Everton	1–2 (2–4 agg.)	Colo-Colo	Viña del Mar
15:00	Ceratto 26'	Report	Villanueva 55'; Parraguez 90+6' (pen.)	Stadium: Sausalito; Referee: Christian Rojas

12 October 2019	Unión Española	2–1 (3–1 agg.)	Audax Italiano	Independencia, Santiago
17:30	Galdames 25'; Arace 70'	Report	Holgado 45'	Stadium: Santa Laura; Referee: Julio Bascuñán

12 October 2019	Universidad Católica	2–0 (3–2 agg.)	Unión La Calera	Las Condes, Santiago
20:15	Aued 38' (pen.); Puch 87'	Report		Stadium: San Carlos de Apoquindo; Referee: Roberto Tobar

=== Semifinals ===
With the ANFP's Council of Presidents voting to conclude the 2019 season on 29 November 2019, it was decided that both the semifinals and final would be single-legged series to be played in January 2020.

18 January 2020	Universidad Católica	1–1 (2–4 p)	Colo-Colo	Temuco
18:00	Aued 71' (pen.)	Report	Valencia 90+4' (pen.)	Stadium: Municipal Germán Becker; Attendance: 13,022; Referee: Roberto Tobar
	Penalties
	Aued (penalty missed); Fuenzalida (penalty scored); Puch (penalty missed); Zampedri (penalty scored)		(penalty scored) Fernández; (penalty scored) Barroso; (penalty scored) Insaurralde; (penalty scored) Valencia

18 January 2020	Universidad de Chile	3–0; Walkover	Unión Española	La Serena
20:30				Stadium: La Portada; Referee: Ángelo Hermosilla
Note: Match awarded to Universidad de Chile by walkover since Unión Española did not show up at the stadium.

=== Final ===
22 January 2020
18:30

Universidad de Chile	1–2	Colo-Colo
Rodríguez 90+4'	Report	Bolados 27'; Parraguez 30'

Estadio Municipal Germán Becker, Temuco
Attendance: 12,259
Referee: Julio Bascuñán
