= 2019 Campeonato Nacional Primera B =

Primera B de Chile
- Season: 2019
- Dates: 15 February – 29 November 2019
- Champions: Santiago Wanderers (3rd title)
- Promoted: Santiago Wanderers; Deportes La Serena
- Matches: 213
- Goals: 501 (2.35 per match)
- Top goalscorer: Mathías Pinto (14 goals)
- Biggest home win: Deportes Valdivia 4–0 Santa Cruz (17 February); Melipilla 4–0 La Serena (28 April); Unión San Felipe 4–0 Rangers (10 August); S. Wanderers 5–1 Cobreloa (13 October); La Serena 4–0 Unión San Felipe (19 October)
- Biggest away win: Deportes Valdivia 0–5 Puerto Montt (12 May)
- Highest scoring: Ñublense 3–3 Deportes Valdivia (10 March); S. Wanderers 5–1 Cobreloa (13 October)

The 2019 Primera B de Chile (known as Campeonato As.com 2019 for sponsoring purposes) was the 66th season of Chile's second-tier football league. The competition began on 15 February 2019 and was scheduled to end in December 2019.

Due to the 2019 Chilean protests, the competition was suspended since mid-October with three matches as well as the promotion play-offs still left. After a failed attempt to resume normal activity, on 29 November 2019, ANFP's Council of Presidents voted to conclude the season. Originally it was decided that no teams would be either promoted or relegated this season, however, on 6 December 2019 ANFP decided to declare Santiago Wanderers, who were leading the competition at the time of the suspension, as champions and promoted to the Primera División, as well as allowing another team to be promoted through a play-off. No teams were relegated to the Segunda División Profesional this season.

== Format ==
The tournament was played by 16 teams, under the same format used in the previous edition: the 16 teams would play each other twice (once at home and once away), for a total of 30 matches. The team that finished in first place at the end of the round-robin tournament earned promotion to the Campeonato Nacional for the 2020 season as Primera B champions. Meanwhile, the teams finishing from second to tenth place will play a playoff tournament for the second promotion berth, with the season runners-up having a bye to the final. The team finishing in bottom place at the end of the season would have been relegated to the Segunda División Profesional.

== Teams ==
=== Stadia and locations ===
Locations of the 2019 Primera B de Chile teams

Club	City	Stadium	Capacity
Barnechea	Santiago (Lo Barnechea)	Municipal de Lo Barnechea	3,000
Cobreloa	Calama	Zorros del Desierto	12,346
Deportes Copiapó	Copiapó	Luis Valenzuela Hermosilla	8,000
Deportes La Serena	La Serena	La Portada	18,243
Deportes Melipilla	Melipilla	Municipal Roberto Bravo Santibáñez	6,000
Deportes Puerto Montt	Puerto Montt	Chinquihue	10,000
Deportes Santa Cruz	Santa Cruz	Joaquín Muñoz García	5,000
Deportes Temuco	Temuco	Germán Becker	18,413
Deportes Valdivia	Valdivia	Parque Municipal	5,397
Magallanes	Santiago (San Bernardo)	Municipal Luis Navarro Avilés	3,500
Ñublense	Chillán	Municipal Nelson Oyarzún Arenas	12,000
Rangers	Talca	Fiscal de Talca	8,200
San Luis	Quillota	Lucio Fariña Fernández	7,680
Santiago Morning	Santiago (La Pintana)	Municipal de La Pintana	6,000
Santiago Wanderers	Valparaíso	Elías Figueroa Brander	20,575
Unión San Felipe	San Felipe	Municipal de San Felipe	12,000

== Standings ==
Pos	Team	Pld	W	D	L	GF	GA	GD	Pts	Qualification
1	Santiago Wanderers (C, P)	27	13	7	7	40	26	+14	46	Promotion to Primera División
2	Deportes La Serena (P)	27	12	7	8	35	27	+8	43	Qualification for Promotion final
3	Ñublense	27	11	9	7	38	32	+6	42	Qualification for Promotion playoff quarterfinals
4	Barnechea	27	12	4	11	26	27	−1	40	Qualification for Promotion playoff quarterfinals
5	Cobreloa	26	10	9	7	40	33	+7	39	Qualification for Promotion playoff quarterfinals
6	Deportes Melipilla	26	10	9	7	33	26	+7	39	Qualification for Promotion playoff quarterfinals
7	Unión San Felipe	27	11	6	10	30	30	0	39	Qualification for Promotion playoff quarterfinals
8	Deportes Temuco	27	9	11	7	31	24	+7	38	Qualification for Promotion playoff quarterfinals
9	Deportes Copiapó	26	9	11	6	28	21	+7	38	Qualification for Promotion playoff quarterfinals
10	Deportes Puerto Montt	27	9	10	8	36	29	+7	37	Qualification for Promotion playoff quarterfinals
11	Deportes Santa Cruz	27	10	7	10	32	37	−5	37	
12	Santiago Morning	26	9	7	10	26	32	−6	34	
13	Rangers	27	6	10	11	28	36	−8	28	
14	San Luis	26	5	12	9	25	37	−12	27	
15	Magallanes	26	5	10	11	23	33	−10	25	
16	Deportes Valdivia	27	4	7	16	30	51	−21	19	

Source: ANFP, Soccerway
Rules for classification: 1) Points, 2) Goal difference, 3) Matches won, 4) Goals for, 5) Away goals for, 6) Red cards, 7) Yellow cards, 8) Drawing of lots, 9) Playoff game (only if needed to decide championship).
If needed to decide championship between two teams: 2) Playoff game.
(C) Champions; (P) Promoted

== Results ==
Home \ Away	BAR	COB	CDC	DLS	MEL	DPM	DSC	TEM	VAL	MAG	ÑUB	RAN	SL	SM	SW	USF
Barnechea	—	0–1	2–0	0–2	0–1	2–1	1–2	1–0	—	0–1	1–2	2–2	3–2	0–0	2–1	2–0
Cobreloa	—	—	0–0	3–1	0–1	2–1	—	2–2	2–1	0–0	1–2	2–2	3–0	3–0	4–1	1–0
Deportes Copiapó	3–0	2–1	—	1–1	1–3	—	3–0	1–1	2–0	1–1	1–0	1–0	0–0	1–0	—	0–1
Deportes La Serena	1–0	1–2	0–0	—	—	—	1–2	3–2	2–1	1–1	0–2	2–0	2–0	2–0	0–0	4–0
Deportes Melipilla	0–0	1–1	—	4–0	—	2–0	2–2	—	2–0	0–0	1–1	0–0	1–1	3–1	2–1	0–2
Deportes Puerto Montt	3–0	1–1	2–2	1–0	1–3	—	0–0	2–1	4–1	1–1	2–2	0–0	—	2–1	2–1	0–0
Deportes Santa Cruz	0–1	1–0	—	1–3	1–0	2–0	—	0–4	1–1	3–0	1–1	1–1	2–3	2–0	0–0	2–0
Deportes Temuco	0–1	2–1	1–0	1–0	1–1	0–1	—	—	4–1	2–0	1–0	3–2	0–0	0–0	0–0	—
Deportes Valdivia	2–1	2–3	1–1	0–2	1–1	0–5	4–0	0–0	—	—	2–3	1–1	4–1	1–2	0–1	
Magallanes	1–2	—	3–0	—	1–2	1–1	1–1	2–0	3–2	—	0–2	0–3	0–0	1–1	0–2	0–1
Ñublense	—	3–2	2–2	1–2	2–0	2–0	2–0	1–1	3–3	2–3	—	—	0–0	0–2	0–4	3–1
Rangers	0–1	—	0–2	0–0	2–0	0–3	0–3	1–1	2–0	1–1	1–0	—	3–1	3–1	0–1	2–3
San Luis	0–2	1–1	1–1	0–3	—	1–1	2–1	1–1	1–1	2–1	0–1	3–2	—	—	2–2	1–1
Santiago Morning	2–0	1–1	1–0	0–0	3–2	1–0	1–3	0–0	2–0	—	1–1	—	0–2	—	2–1	3–1
Santiago Wanderers	0–0	5–1	0–3	4–1	2–1	1–1	3–1	1–0	2–0	2–1	—	0–0	—	3–1	—	1–2
Unión San Felipe	0–2	2–2	0–0	1–1	2–0	2–1	3–0	2–3	0–1	1–0	0–0	4–0	1–0	—	0–1	—

Source: ANFP, Soccerway
Legend: Blue = home team win; Yellow = draw; Red = away team win.

== Promotion play-off ==
The promotion play-offs were played by the nine teams placed from second to tenth place in the league table at the end of the season. Deportes La Serena, as league runners-up, received a bye to the promotion final, while the remaining eight teams played a play-off for the second berth to the promotion final. For the quarter-finals, teams were paired according to their final placement in the Primera B standings, with the third-placed team facing the tenth-placed team, the fourth-placed team facing the ninth-placed one and so on. The winners advanced to the semi-finals, with the higher-seeded team advancing in case of a draw. For the semi-finals, teams were reseeded according to their average of points per match in the league season, with the teams with the higher average playing the teams with lower average. The winners advanced to the finals, with the winners of that match facing Deportes La Serena for the second promotion berth. For the semi-finals, final, and promotion final, a penalty shoot-out would decide the winners in case of a draw. All matches of the promotion play-off were played at a neutral venue, in this case Estadio Nacional Julio Martínez Prádanos in Santiago.

Quarter-finals
6	Deportes Melipilla	2
7	Unión San Felipe	0
4	Barnechea	1
9	Deportes Copiapó	2
3	Ñublense	2
10	Deportes Puerto Montt	1
5	Cobreloa	0
8	Deportes Temuco	2

Semi-finals
5	Deportes Melipilla	1 (3)
7	Deportes Copiapó (p)	1 (4)
3	Ñublense	0
9	Deportes Temuco	1

Final
7	Deportes Copiapó	2
9	Deportes Temuco	3

=== Quarter-finals ===
11 January 2020
18:00

Ñublense	2–1	Deportes Puerto Montt
Briceño 1'; Escalante 67'	Report	Altamirano 52'

Estadio Nacional Julio Martínez Prádanos, Ñuñoa, Santiago
Referee: Piero Maza
11 January 2020
20:30

Barnechea	1–2	Deportes Copiapó
Duma 81'	Report	Quinteros 73', 85'

Estadio Nacional Julio Martínez Prádanos, Ñuñoa, Santiago
Referee: Felipe González
12 January 2020
18:00

Deportes Melipilla	2–0	Unión San Felipe
Montecinos 15'; Rojas 67'	Report

Estadio Nacional Julio Martínez Prádanos, Ñuñoa, Santiago
Referee: Juan Lara
12 January 2020
20:30

Cobreloa	0–2	Deportes Temuco
	Report	Taiva 50'; Cellerino 85'

Estadio Nacional Julio Martínez Prádanos, Ñuñoa, Santiago
Referee: Julio Bascuñán

=== Semi-finals ===
15 January 2020
18:00

Deportes Melipilla	1–1	Deportes Copiapó
Sepúlveda 74'	Report	Vazzoler 50'
Penalties
Sosa (penalty scored); Cortés (penalty scored); Lauler (penalty missed); Escalona (penalty missed); Sepúlveda (penalty scored)	3–4	(penalty missed) Quinteros; (penalty scored) Munizaga; (penalty scored) Tiznado; (penalty scored) González; (penalty scored) Ponce

Estadio Nacional Julio Martínez Prádanos, Ñuñoa, Santiago
Referee: Héctor Jona
15 January 2020
20:30

Ñublense	0–1	Deportes Temuco
	Report	Casanova 69'

Estadio Nacional Julio Martínez Prádanos, Ñuñoa, Santiago
Referee: Christian Rojas

=== Final ===
19 January 2020
20:00

Deportes Copiapó	2–3	Deportes Temuco
Guajardo 47'; Vega 72'	Report	Droguett 53'; Cellerino 57'; Donoso 83'

Estadio Nacional Julio Martínez Prádanos, Ñuñoa, Santiago
Referee: Francisco Gilabert

=== Promotion final ===
23 January 2020
20:00

Deportes La Serena	0–0	Deportes Temuco
Penalties
Valdés (penalty scored); Ruiz (penalty missed); Achucarro (penalty scored); Domínguez (penalty scored); Pino (penalty missed); Leyton (penalty scored)	4–3	(penalty scored) Canío; (penalty scored) Cellerino; (penalty missed) Díaz; (penalty scored) Águila; (penalty missed) Donoso; (penalty missed) Droguett

Estadio Nacional Julio Martínez Prádanos, Ñuñoa, Santiago
Referee: Roberto Tobar

== Top goalscorers ==
Rank	Name	Club	Goals
1	(Chile) Mathías Pinto	Ñublense	14
2	(Argentina) Maximiliano Quinteros	Deportes Copiapó	13
3	(Uruguay) Ignacio Lemmo	Deportes Puerto Montt	12
3	(Argentina) Gonzalo Sosa	Deportes Melipilla	12
5	(Argentina) Nicolás Gauna	Deportes Puerto Montt	11
5	(Chile) Ignacio Jara	Cobreloa	11
5	(Argentina) Sebastián Pol	Deportes Valdivia	11
8	(Argentina) Gustavo Gotti	Deportes Santa Cruz	8
8	(Argentina) Gustavo Lanaro	Santiago Wanderers	8
10	(Argentina) Diego Bielkiewicz	Rangers	7
10	(Argentina) Enzo Gutiérrez	Santiago Wanderers	7
10	(Chile) Luca Pontigo	Deportes Santa Cruz	7

Source: Soccerway

== See also ==
- 2019 Chilean Primera División
