= 2018 Campeonato Nacional Primera B =

Primera B de Chile
- Season: 2018
- Dates: 2 February – 1 December 2018
- Champions: Coquimbo Unido (3rd title)
- Promoted: Coquimbo Unido; Cobresal
- Relegated: San Marcos de Arica
- Matches: 248
- Goals: 620 (2.5 per match)
- Top goalscorer: Rodrigo Holgado (18 goals)
- Biggest home win: Cobreloa 6–0 Melipilla (12 August)
- Biggest away win: Deportes Valdivia 0–4 S. Wanderers (11 November)
- Highest scoring: San Marcos 2–5 Copiapó (17 February); Copiapó 4–3 S. Wanderers (18 March); U. San Felipe 4–3 Coquimbo Unido (6 October)

The 2018 Primera B de Chile, known as the 2018 Campeonato Loto for sponsorship purposes, was the 65th season of Chile's second-tier football league. The competition began on 2 February 2018 and ended on 1 December 2018. Coquimbo Unido were the champions.

== Format ==
The tournament was played by 16 teams which played each other twice (once at home and once away), for a total of 30 matches. The team that finished in first place at the end of the round-robin tournament earned promotion to the Campeonato Nacional for the 2019 season. Meanwhile, the teams finishing from second to sixth place played in a playoff tournament for the second promotion berth, with the season runners-up having a bye to the final. The team finishing in bottom place at the end of the season was relegated to the Segunda División Profesional.

== Teams ==
=== Stadia and locations ===
Locations of the 2018 Primera B de Chile teams

Club	City	Stadium	Capacity
Barnechea	Santiago (Lo Barnechea)	Municipal de Lo Barnechea	3,000
Cobreloa	Calama	Zorros del Desierto	12,346
Cobresal	El Salvador	El Cobre	12,000
Coquimbo Unido	Coquimbo	Municipal Francisco Sánchez Rumoroso	18,750
Deportes Copiapó	Copiapó	Luis Valenzuela Hermosilla	8,000
Deportes La Serena	La Serena	La Portada	18,243
Deportes Melipilla	Melipilla	Municipal Roberto Bravo Santibáñez	6,000
Deportes Puerto Montt	Puerto Montt	Chinquihue	10,000
Deportes Valdivia	Valdivia	Parque Municipal	5,397
Magallanes	Santiago (San Bernardo)	Municipal de San Bernardo	3,500
Ñublense	Chillán	Municipal Nelson Oyarzún Arenas	12,000
Rangers	Talca	Fiscal de Talca	8,200
San Marcos de Arica	Arica	Carlos Dittborn	9,746
Santiago Morning	Santiago (La Pintana)	Municipal de La Pintana	6,000
Santiago Wanderers	Valparaíso	Elías Figueroa Brander	20,575
Unión San Felipe	San Felipe	Municipal de San Felipe	12,000

== Standings ==
Pos	Team	Pld	W	D	L	GF	GA	GD	Pts	Qualification
1	Coquimbo Unido (C, P)	30	17	6	7	47	31	+16	57	Promotion to Primera División
2	Cobreloa	30	15	7	8	43	31	+12	52	Qualification to Promotion playoff finals
3	Cobresal (P)	30	15	6	9	44	30	+14	51	Qualification to Promotion playoff quarterfinals
4	Deportes Valdivia	30	13	8	9	45	37	+8	47	Qualification to Promotion playoff quarterfinals
5	Santiago Wanderers	30	14	4	12	41	43	−2	46	Qualification to Promotion playoff quarterfinals
6	Santiago Morning	30	13	6	11	34	36	−2	45	Qualification to Promotion playoff quarterfinals
7	Unión San Felipe	30	12	6	12	32	28	+4	42	
8	Rangers	30	11	7	12	33	34	−1	40	
9	Barnechea	30	10	9	11	38	38	0	39	
10	Deportes Melipilla	30	10	9	11	39	41	−2	39	
11	Deportes Puerto Montt	30	10	5	15	31	33	−2	35	
12	Deportes La Serena	30	8	11	11	37	41	−4	35	
13	Magallanes	30	8	10	12	37	41	−4	34	
14	Deportes Copiapó	30	9	7	14	36	44	−8	34	
15	Ñublense	30	8	9	13	27	35	−8	33	
16	San Marcos de Arica (R)	30	8	8	14	28	49	−21	32	Relegation to Segunda División Profesional

Source: ANFP, Soccerway
Rules for classification: 1) Points, 2) Goal difference, 3) Matches won, 4) Goals for, 5) Away goals for, 6) Red cards, 7) Yellow cards, 8) Drawing of lots, 9) Playoff game (only if needed to decide championship).
If needed to decide championship between two teams: 2) Playoff game.
(C) Champions; (P) Promoted; (R) Relegated

== Results ==
Home \ Away	BAR	COB	CSL	COQ	CDC	DLS	MEL	DPM	VAL	MAG	ÑUB	RAN	SMA	SM	SW	USF
Barnechea	—	0–1	3–3	2–4	0–1	2–3	1–0	2–1	1–0	2–2	0–1	1–1	3–1	2–1	2–3	3–1
Cobreloa	3–1	—	1–0	2–2	2–1	2–1	6–0	2–1	2–0	3–2	1–0	3–1	4–0	1–1	2–1	0–1
Cobresal	1–1	1–0	—	2–0	2–0	3–1	3–3	2–1	0–2	1–0	2–0	4–1	2–1	4–0	1–0	2–0
Coquimbo Unido	2–1	2–0	1–1	—	2–1	2–1	2–1	1–0	1–1	1–0	1–0	2–3	4–0	0–0	4–1	1–0
Deportes Copiapó	1–1	0–0	2–1	1–2	—	2–2	0–1	1–0	2–3	0–3	2–1	2–0	2–0	1–1	4–3	1–4
Deportes La Serena	0–1	0–2	2–0	1–0	1–1	—	2–2	1–0	3–3	0–0	1–2	0–1	4–1	2–3	1–1	1–0
Deportes Melipilla	0–2	3–0	2–0	0–0	1–0	2–0	—	1–1	1–1	2–2	4–1	2–3	2–2	0–1	2–1	1–0
Deportes Puerto Montt	1–0	0–0	2–0	1–2	2–0	1–2	3–0	—	2–2	1–0	1–0	0–3	3–0	2–0	2–1	1–3
Deportes Valdivia	1–1	3–2	1–2	1–1	2–1	0–0	3–2	2–1	—	2–2	3–0	1–2	1–0	1–0	4–1	0–2
Magallanes	1–0	0–0	0–2	2–1	1–2	2–2	0–2	1–1	3–2	—	1–1	0–1	2–1	3–1	3–0	1–0
Ñublense	0–1	5–0	0–2	1–2	1–1	1–1	1–1	2–1	1–0	2–1	—	0–0	0–0	0–2	1–0	1–1
Rangers	0–1	1–1	1–1	0–1	4–2	3–1	0–1	0–0	0–1	2–0	0–0	—	1–2	0–0	2–1	0–1
San Marcos de Arica	0–0	2–1	2–1	0–2	2–5	1–1	0–0	0–1	2–1	1–1	3–2	1–2	—	2–1	0–1	1–0
Santiago Morning	2–2	0–0	2–1	2–1	1–0	1–2	3–2	1–0	0–2	3–2	1–2	1–0	0–1	—	0–1	1–0
Santiago Wanderers	1–1	2–1	1–0	2–0	1–0	1–1	1–0	2–1	1–2	4–1	2–1	2–1	2–2	0–2	—	1–0
Unión San Felipe	2–1	0–1	0–0	4–3	0–0	1–0	2–1	2–0	1–0	1–1	0–0	2–0	0–0	2–3	2–3	—

Source: ANFP, Soccerway
Legend: Blue = home team win; Yellow = draw; Red = away team win.

== Promotion playoff ==
Quarterfinals
5	Santiago Wanderers	2	4	6
4	Deportes Valdivia	1	0	1
6	Santiago Morning	1	2	3
3	Cobresal	4	0	4

Semifinals
5	Santiago Wanderers	2	1	3
3	Cobresal	0	4	4

Finals
3	Cobresal	2	2	4
2	Cobreloa	1	2	3

=== Quarterfinals ===
7 November 2018
18:00

Santiago Wanderers	2–1	Deportes Valdivia
Valenzuela 38'; Gutiérrez 90'	Report	Lanaro 45+1'

Estadio Elías Figueroa Brander, Valparaíso
Attendance: 10,170
Referee: Piero Maza
7 November 2018
20:00

Santiago Morning	1–4	Cobresal
Palermo 36'	Report	Corro 4'; Orlando 5'; Sepúlveda 69' (pen.); Sarabia 88'

Estadio Municipal de La Pintana, La Pintana
Attendance: 861
Referee: Francisco Gilabert

11 November 2018
12:30

Deportes Valdivia	0–4	Santiago Wanderers
	Report	Castro 48', 53'; Gutiérrez 65'; Viotti 90+1'

Parque Municipal, Valdivia
Attendance: 3,700
Referee: José Cabero

Santiago Wanderers won 6–1 on aggregate.

11 November 2018
15:30

Cobresal	0–2	Santiago Morning
	Report	Escalante 15' (pen.); Gatica 22'

Estadio El Cobre, El Salvador
Attendance: 632
Referee: Cristián Garay

Cobresal won 4–3 on aggregate.

=== Semifinals ===
14 November 2018
19:00

Santiago Wanderers	2–0	Cobresal
Gutiérrez 26'; Medel 72'	Report

Estadio Elías Figueroa Brander, Valparaíso
Attendance: 13,284
Referee: Piero Maza

18 November 2018
17:00

Cobresal	4–1	Santiago Wanderers
Gaete 9'; Cantero 15', 90+5' (pen.); Mesías 90+1'	Report	Gutiérrez 1'

Estadio El Cobre, El Salvador
Attendance: 1,037
Referee: Felipe González

Cobresal won 4–3 on aggregate.

=== Finals ===
24 November 2018
17:30

Cobresal	2–1	Cobreloa
Castro 45+1'; González 82' (pen.)	Report	Parra 16'

Estadio El Cobre, El Salvador
Attendance: 2,168
Referee: César Deischler

1 December 2018
17:30

Cobreloa	2–2	Cobresal
Parra 52', 70'	Report	Sanhueza 10' (o.g.); Gaete 68'

Estadio Zorros del Desierto, Calama
Attendance: 11,418
Referee: Felipe González

Cobresal won 4–3 on aggregate and earned promotion to the Primera División.

== Top goalscorers ==
Rank	Name	Club	Goals
1	(Argentina) Rodrigo Holgado	Coquimbo Unido	18
2	(Argentina) Lucas Simón	Cobreloa	17
3	(Argentina) Gustavo Lanaro	Deportes Valdivia	13
4	(Paraguay) Ever Cantero	Cobresal	12
4	(Argentina) Enzo Gutiérrez	Santiago Wanderers	12
4	(Chile) Miguel Orellana	Barnechea	12
7	(Venezuela) Reiner Castro	Santiago Wanderers	10
7	(Chile) Germán Estigarribia	Deportes Copiapó	10
7	(Argentina) Gonzalo Sosa	Magallanes	10
10	(Argentina) Óscar Ortega	Santiago Morning	8
10	(Chile) Steffan Pino	Deportes Melipilla	8
10	(Chile) Mathias Pinto	Deportes Melipilla	8

Source: Soccerway

== See also ==
- 2018 Chilean Primera División
