= 2016–17 Campeonato Nacional Primera B =

Primera B de Chile
- Season: 2016–17
- Champions: Curicó Unido (2nd title)
- Promoted: Curicó Unido

The 2016–17 Primera B de Chile, known as the 2016–17 Campeonato Loto for sponsorship purposes, was the 63rd season of Chile's second-flight football. The competition began on July 31, 2016 and ended on April 30, 2017.

== Participating teams ==
=== Stadia and locations ===
Locations of 2016–17 Primera B de Chile teams

Team	Stadium	Capacity
Cobreloa	Zorros del Desierto	12,000
Coquimbo Unido	Francisco Sánchez Rumoroso	18,750
Curicó Unido	La Granja	8,000
Deportes Copiapó	Luis Valenzuela Hermosilla	8,000
Deportes La Serena	La Portada	18,243
Deportes Puerto Montt	Chinquihue	10,000
Deportes Valdivia	Parque Municipal	5,397
Iberia	Municipal de Los Ángeles	4,150
Magallanes	Municipal de San Bernardo	3,500
Ñublense	Nelson Oyarzún	12,000
Rangers	Fiscal de Talca	8,200
San Marcos de Arica	Carlos Dittborn	14,373
Santiago Morning	Santiago Bueras	5,000
Unión La Calera	Municipal Nicolás Chahuán	15,000
Unión San Felipe	Municipal de San Felipe	12,000

== Aggregate table ==
Pos	Team	Pld	W	D	L	GF	GA	GD	Pts	Promotion or qualification
1	Curicó Unido (C, P)	28	16	9	3	43	22	+21	57	Promotion to Primera División
2	San Marcos de Arica	28	14	8	6	36	24	+12	50	Promotion playoff
3	Coquimbo Unido	28	12	7	9	33	28	+5	43	
4	Deportes La Serena	28	12	7	9	36	32	+4	43	
5	Santiago Morning	28	12	6	10	36	30	+6	42	
6	Cobreloa	28	11	8	9	44	36	+8	41	
7	Rangers	28	10	10	8	34	35	−1	40	
8	Deportes Puerto Montt	28	8	13	7	21	21	0	37	
9	Magallanes	28	9	9	10	33	33	0	36	
10	Unión San Felipe	28	7	11	10	31	30	+1	32	
11	Deportes Copiapó	28	7	11	10	20	22	−2	32	
12	Deportes Valdivia	28	8	8	12	29	42	−13	32	
13	Ñublense	28	6	11	11	25	34	−9	29	
14	Iberia	28	7	7	14	41	51	−10	28	
15	Unión La Calera	28	4	9	15	23	45	−22	18 (Note: 3 points deducted)	

Updated to match(es) played on 30 April 2017. Source: ANFP
Rules for classification: 1) points; 2) goal difference; 3) number of goals scored.
(C) Champions; (P) Promoted

== See also ==
- 2016–17 Chilean Primera División season
- 2016–17 Segunda División Profesional de Chile
