= Juan Carlos Gaete =

Chilean footballer (born 1997)

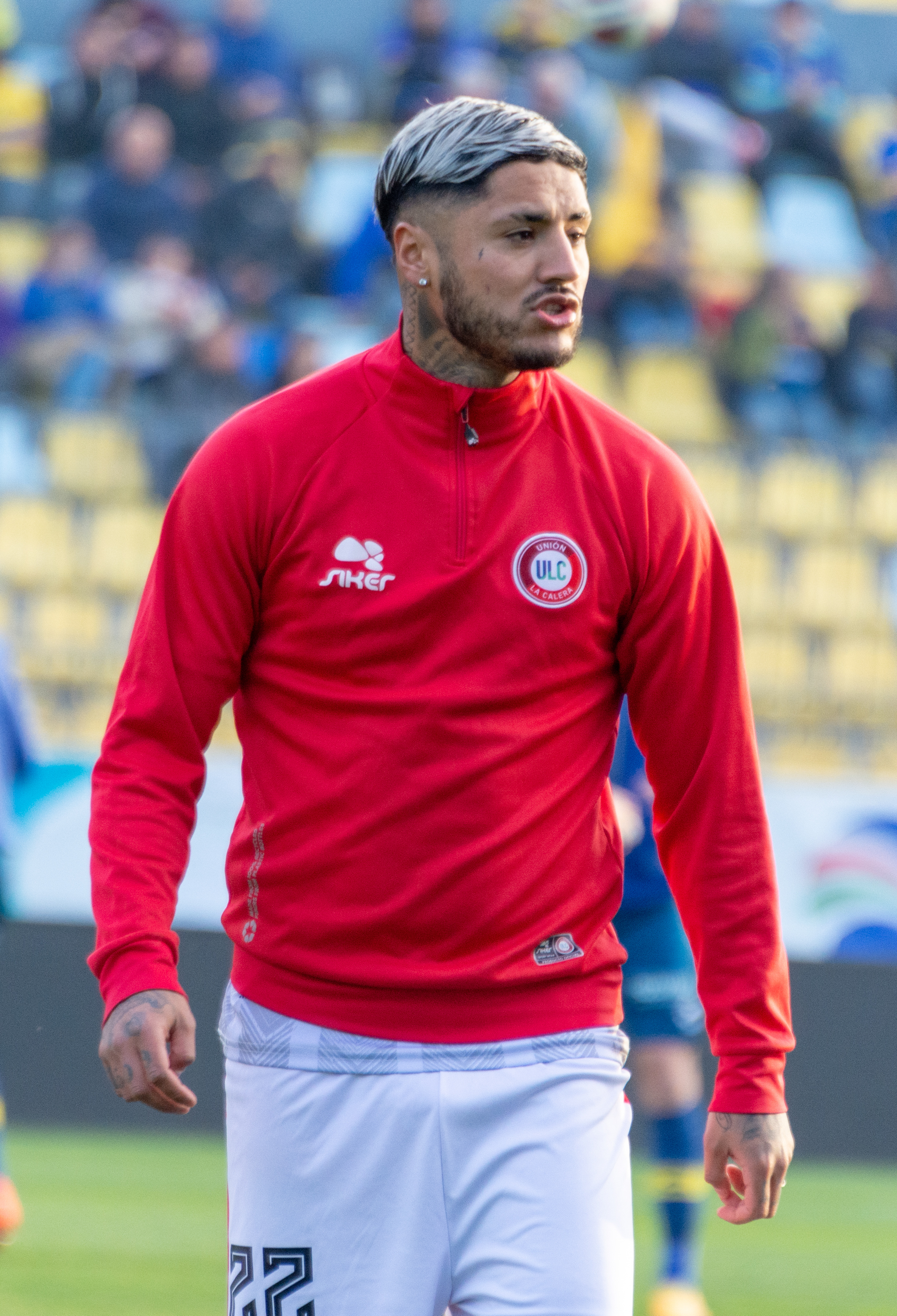
- Gaete with Unión La Calera in 2023

Personal information
- Full name: Juan Carlos Darío Gaete Contreras
- Date of birth: 21 May 1997 (age 29)
- Place of birth: Santiago, Chile
- Height: 1.75 m (5 ft 9 in)
- Position: Forward

Team information
- Current team: Cartaginés

Youth career
- Deportes La Serena
- Magallanes

Senior career*
Years	Team	Apps	(Gls)
2014–2017	Magallanes	12	(0)
2015–2017	→ Deportes Santa Cruz (loan)	59	(22)
2018	Cobresal	30	(9)
2019	Colo-Colo	0	(0)
2019	→ Deportes Santa Cruz (loan)	13	(1)
2019–2020	Cobresal	38	(8)
2021–2024	Colo-Colo	5	(1)
2021–2022	→ Cobresal (loan)	41	(2)
2023	→ Unión La Calera (loan)	14	(2)
2023	→ San Luis (loan)	11	(1)
2024	→ Deportes Copiapó (loan)	19	(3)
2025	Cobresal	11	(0)
2026–	Cartaginés	19	(8)
- * Club domestic league appearances and goals as of 29 October 2026

Juan Carlos Darío Gaete Contreras (born 21 May 1997), known as Juan Carlos Gaete, is a Chilean footballer who plays as a forward for Costa Rican club Cartaginés.

== Club career ==
As a youth player, Gaete was with Deportes La Serena.

In July 2023, he ended his loan from Colo-Colo with Unión La Calera and switched to San Luis de Quillota in the Primera B until the end of the season. The next year, he was loaned to Deportes Copiapó in the top level.

After ending hos contract with Colo-Colo, Gaete returned to Cobresal for the fourth time for the 2025 season.

In January 2026, Gaete moved abroad and joined Costa Rican club Cartaginés.

=== Controversies ===
On 2019 season, Gaete joined Colo-Colo from Cobresal, but he left the training preseason in Buenos Aires returning to Chile to think about his future, according to Colo-Colo. Finally he was loaned to Deportes Santa Cruz at the Primera B, where again he had a similar episode.

On 12 August 2020, he told the reasons why left Colo-Colo, arguing he was disagreed with the money.

== International career ==
He received his first call up to the Chile senior team to play the 2022 FIFA World Cup qualification matches against Uruguay and Colombia on 8 and 13 October respectively, but he was withdrawn from the squad due to injury before the second match.

== Career statistics ==
=== Club ===
As of 3 October 2020.

Club	Season	League			Cup		Continental		Other		Total	
Club	Season	Division	Apps	Goals	Apps	Goals	Apps	Goals	Apps	Goals	Apps	Goals
Magallanes	2014-15	Primera B	12	0	5	0	0	0	0	0	17	0
Santa Cruz (loan)	2015–16	Segunda; División	23	9	0	0	0	0	0	0	23	9
Santa Cruz (loan)	2016–17	Segunda; División	26	11	0	0	0	0	0	0	26	11
Santa Cruz (loan)	2017-T	Segunda; División	10	2	0	0	0	0	0	0	10	2
Santa Cruz (loan)	2019	Primera B	13	1	1	0	0	0	0	0	14	1
Santa Cruz (loan)	Total		72	23	1	0	0	0	0	0	73	23
Cobresal	2018	Primera B	30	9	7	1	0	0	0	0	37	10
Cobresal	2019	Primera; División	7	1	0	0	0	0	0	0	7	1
Cobresal	2020	Primera; División	13	4	0	0	0	0	0	0	13	4
Cobresal	Total		50	14	7	1	0	0	0	0	57	15
Total career			134	37	13 (Note: Appearances in the Copa Chile)	1	0	0	0	0	147	38
