= Luis Bustamante =

Luis Bustamante may refer to:

- Luis Bustamante Cordero (1885―?), Chilean journalist and politician
- Luis Bustamante (baseball) (b. 1880), Cuban baseball player
- Luis Bustamante Flores (born 1987), Chilean table-tennis player
- Luis Bustamante (footballer) (born 1985), Argentine professional football player

== See also ==
- José Luis Bustamante y Rivero (1894–1989), Peruvian politician, president in 1945 to 1948
- José Luís Varela Bustamente (born 1978), Venezuelan professional boxer
