= Jorge Gatica =

Chilean footballer (born 1996)

Personal information
- Full name: Jorge Paul Gatica Villegas
- Date of birth: June 17, 1996 (age 30)
- Place of birth: Providencia, Santiago, Chile
- Height: 1.72 m (5 ft 8 in)
- Position: Midfielder

Team information
- Current team: Cobreloa

Youth career
- Escuela Martín Gálvez
- Santiago Morning

Senior career*
| Years | Team | Apps | (Gls) |
| 2015–2019 | Santiago Morning | 101 | (6) |
| 2020–2022 | Coquimbo Unido | 66 | (1) |
| 2023–2025 | Santiago Wanderers | 89 | (17) |
| 2026– | Cobreloa | 0 | (0) |
- * Club domestic league appearances and goals as of 18 December 2025

Jorge Paul Gatica Villegas (born June 17, 1996) is a Chilean professional footballer who plays as midfielder for Cobreloa.

== Career ==
After three seasons with Coquimbo Unido, also winning the 2021 Primera B de Chile, Gatica joined Santiago Wanderers for the 2023 season. He left them at the end of 2025.

On 17 December 2025, Gatica signed with Cobreloa.

== Career statistics ==
As of 9 September 2020

| Club | Season | League | | | Cup | | Continental | | Other | | Total | |
| Club | Season | Division | Apps | Goals | Apps | Goals | Apps | Goals | Apps | Goals | Apps | Goals |
|---|---|---|---|---|---|---|---|---|---|---|---|---|
| Santiago; Morning | 2015–16 | Primera B | 7 | 0 | 5 | 1 | — | | 0 | 0 | 12 | 1 |
| Santiago; Morning | 2016–17 | Primera B | 26 | 2 | 2 | 0 | — | | 0 | 0 | 28 | 2 |
| Santiago; Morning | 2017–T | Primera B | 14 | 0 | 2 | 1 | — | | 0 | 0 | 16 | 1 |
| Santiago; Morning | 2018 | Primera B | 31 | 3 | 1 | 0 | — | | 0 | 0 | 32 | 3 |
| Santiago; Morning | 2019 | Primera B | 23 | 1 | 5 | 1 | — | | 0 | 0 | 28 | 2 |
| Santiago; Morning | Total | | 101 | 6 | 15 | 3 | — | | 0 | 0 | 116 | 9 |
| Coquimbo; Unido | 2020 | Primera; División | 5 | 0 | 0 | 0 | 0 (Note: Appearances in the Copa Sudamericana) | 0 | 0 | 0 | 5 | 0 |
| Total career | | | 106 | 6 | 15 (Note: Appearances in the Copa Chile) | 3 | 0 | 0 | 0 | 0 | 121 | 9 |

== Honours ==
Coquimbo Unido

- Primera B de Chile: 2021

Cobreloa

- Primera B de Chile: 2026
