= Matías Marín =

Chilean footballer (born 1999)

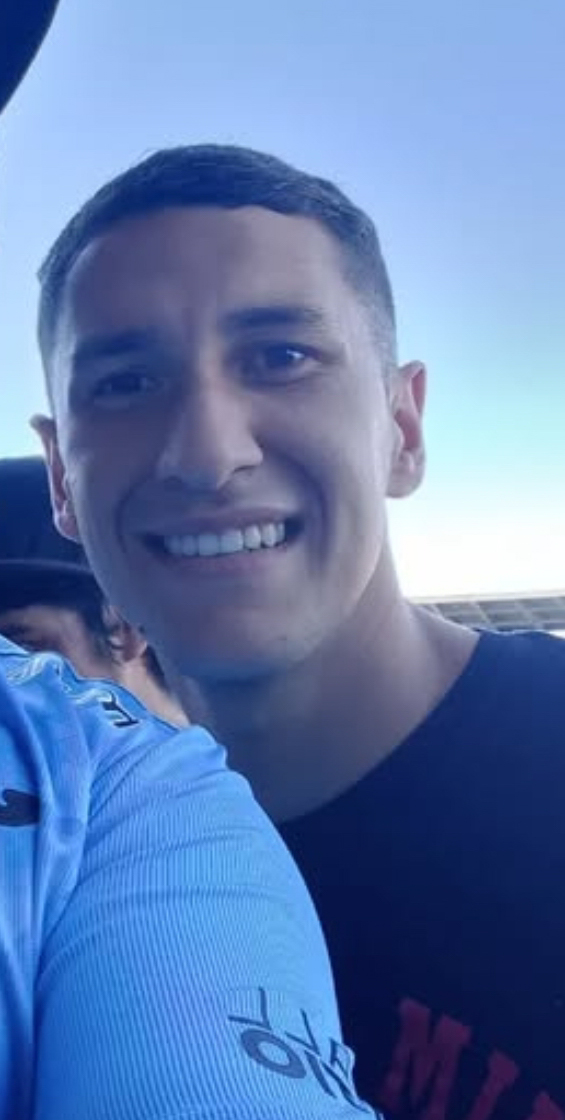

Personal information
- Full name: Matías Nicolás Marín Vega
- Date of birth: 19 December 1999 (age 26)
- Place of birth: Viña del Mar, Chile
- Height: 1.69 m (5 ft 7 in)
- Position: Midfielder

Team information
- Current team: Deportes La Serena (on loan from Belgrano)

Youth career
- 2010–2018: Santiago Wanderers

Senior career*
Years	Team	Apps	(Gls)
2018–2021	Santiago Wanderers	74	(5)
2022–2023	O'Higgins	40	(9)
2023–	Belgrano	24	(2)
2025	→ Unión Española (loan)	11	(2)
2026–	→ Deportes La Serena (loan)	13	(1)

International career^{‡}
2015	Chile U17		
2019	Chile U20	3	(0)
- * Club domestic league appearances and goals as of 15 December 2025 ‡ National team caps and goals as of 26 January 2019

Matías Nicolás Marín Vega (born 19 December 1999) is a professional footballer who plays as a midfielder for Deportes La Serena on loan from Argentine club Belgrano.

== Club career ==
He joined Santiago Wanderers Youth Team at the age of 11. He signed his first professional contract on June 30, 2018, but he had made his official debut in the 2018 Primera B match against Cobreloa on June 3. Along with Santiago Wanderers, he got promotion to Chilean Primera División after becoming 2019 Primera B champion.

After playing for O'Higgins in 2022–23, Marín moved to Argentine Primera División side Belgrano in the second half of 2023. In January 2025, he was loaned out to Unión Española for a year. The next season, he was loaned out to Deportes La Serena.

== International career ==
In 2015, he represented Chile U17 in some friendly matches and Chile U20 at the 2019 South American U-20 Championship, making three appearances.

== Honours ==
Santiago Wanderers

- Primera B: 2019
