= Henry Sanhueza =

Chilean footballer (born 1996)

Personal information
- Full name: Henry Steven Sanhueza Galaz
- Date of birth: 24 March 1996 (age 30)
- Place of birth: Constitución, Chile
- Height: 1.78 m (5 ft 10 in)
- Position: Defender

Team information
- Current team: Curicó Unido
- Number: 15

Youth career
- 2008–2015: Colo-Colo

Senior career*
Years	Team	Apps	(Gls)
2012–2014	Colo-Colo B	18	(0)
2015–2018	Colo-Colo	1	(0)
2016–2017	→ Deportes Antofagasta (loan)	0	(0)
2017	→ Barnechea (loan)	14	(1)
2018	→ Rangers (loan)	9	(0)
2019	Barnechea	25	(0)
2020	Palestino	18	(1)
2021	Universidad de Concepción	9	(0)
2022	Unión La Calera	24	(0)
2023	Deportes La Serena	26	(1)
2024	Universidad de Concepción	24	(0)
2025–	Curicó Unido	27	(3)

International career
2015	Chile U20		
- * Club domestic league appearances and goals as of 3 February 2026

Henry Steven Sanhueza Galaz (born 24 March 1996) is a Chilean footballer who plays as a defender for Curicó Unido.

== Club career ==
Born in Constitución, Maule Region, he moved Colo-Colo youth set-up in 2008. During his years playing at the youth ranks, Sanhueza highlighted as centre back, being an undisputed player and even coming to dispute the 2013 Nereo Rocco Tournament at Gradisca d'Isonzo as team captain. On 24 September 2015, the sports magazine El Gráfico reported that his agent is Argentine businessman Fernando Felicevich, who has raised Chilean international figures such as Gary Medel and Alexis Sánchez.

In January 2016, Sanhueza was finally promoted to first-adult team, debuting in a friendly match against Peruvian side Universitario de Deportes in a 2–0 home win, with José Luis Sierra as coach.

== International career ==
Along with Chile U20, he won the L'Alcúdia Tournament in 2015.

== Honours ==
Chile U20

- L'Alcúdia International Tournament (1): 2015
