= Ariel Cáceres =

Chilean footballer

Personal information
- Full name: Ariel Ignacio Cáceres Lizana
- Date of birth: 21 November 1999 (age 26)
- Place of birth: Independencia, Santiago, Chile
- Height: 1.81 m (5 ft 11 in)
- Positions: Right-back; right winger

Team information
- Current team: Deportes Concepción
- Number: 4

Youth career
- Unión La Calera

Senior career*
Years	Team	Apps	(Gls)
2019–2025	Unión La Calera	15	(1)
2021	→ San Luis (loan)	25	(1)
2022	→ Deportes La Serena (loan)	23	(0)
2023–2024	→ San Luis (loan)	44	(1)
2025	→ Deportes Concepción (loan)	27	(1)
2026–	Deportes Concepción	0	(0)
- * Club domestic league appearances and goals as of 31 December 2025

Ariel Ignacio Cáceres Lizana (born 21 November 1999) is a Chilean footballer who plays as a right-back for Deportes Concepción. Mainly a right-back, he can also operate at offensive positions on the right side of the field.

== Club career ==
Born in Independencia commune, Santiago de Chile, Cáceres is a product of Unión La Calera and made his professional debut scoring the goal in the 1–1 away draw against Deportes Antofagasta on 25 May 2019 for the Chilean Primera División. He made an appearance at the 2020 Copa Sudamericana in the 1–1 away draw against Fluminense on 4 February, becoming the first player from the youth ranks to compete at international level in the club history.

In 2021, Cáceres was loaned out to San Luis de Quillota. The next year, he switched to Deportes La Serena in the Chilean top division. Back to play for San Luis de Quillota in 2023, he returned to Unión La Calera on 8 August 2024.

In February 2025, Cáceres was loaned out again to Deportes Concepción.
