= Nicolás Orellana =

Chilean footballer (born 1995)

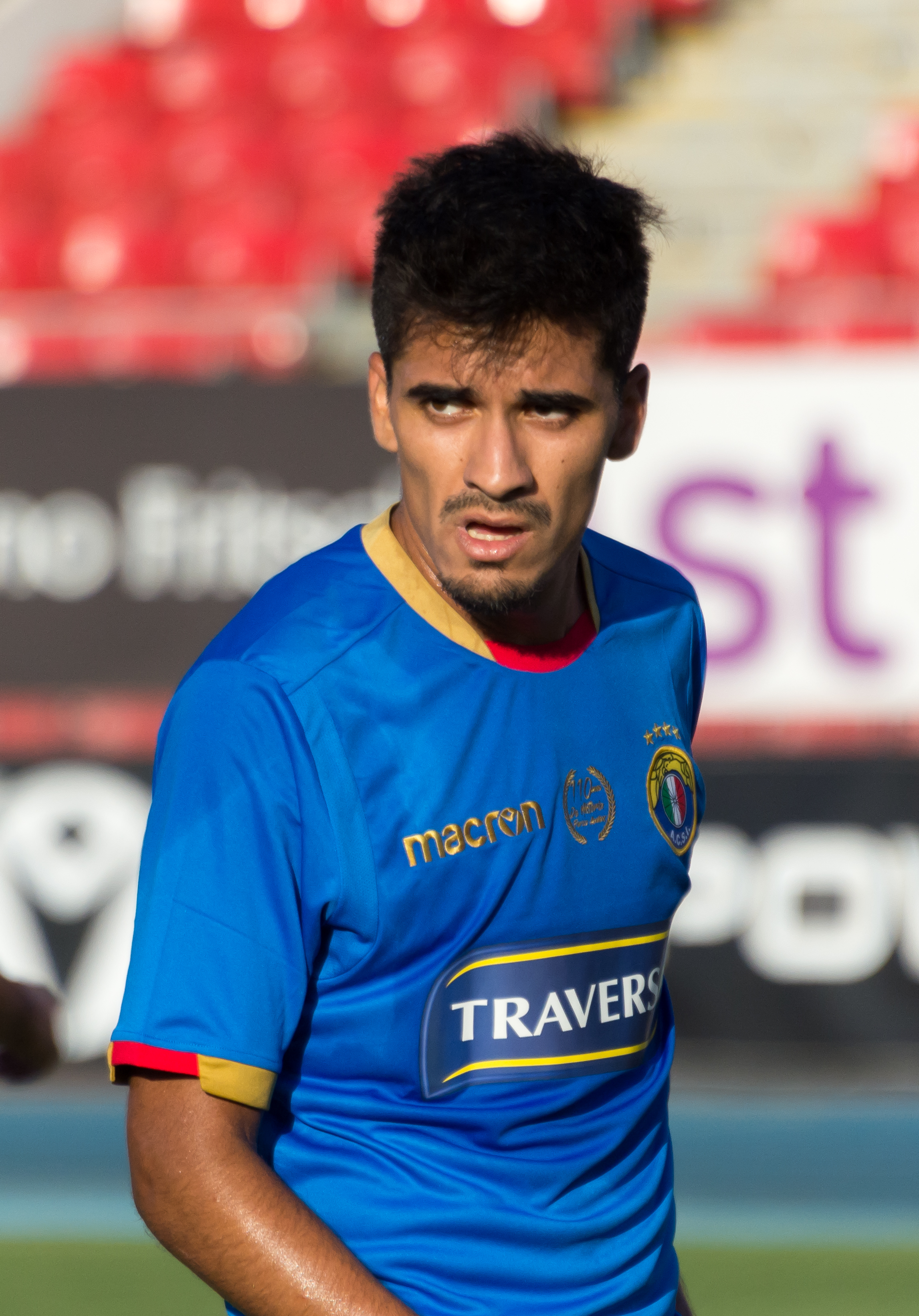
- Orellana with Audax Italiano in 2020

Personal information
- Full name: Nicolás Iván Orellana Acuña
- Date of birth: 3 September 1995 (age 31)
- Place of birth: San Ramón, Santiago, Chile
- Height: 1.80 m (5 ft 11 in)
- Positions: Midfielder; forward

Team information
- Current team: Audax Italiano
- Number: 24

Youth career
- Colo-Colo

Senior career*
Years	Team	Apps	(Gls)
2012–2013	Colo-Colo B	22	(8)
2012–2018	Colo-Colo	21	(2)
2015–2016	→ San Marcos (loan)	30	(5)
2016–2017	→ Everton (loan)	21	(3)
2019	Universidad de Concepción	19	(4)
2020	Audax Italiano	22	(4)
2021–2023	Unión La Calera	79	(7)
2024–	Audax Italiano	14	(2)

International career^{‡}
2014–2015	Chile U20		
- * Club domestic league appearances and goals as of 4 March 2024 ‡ National team caps and goals as of 19 August 2014

Nicolás Iván Orellana Acuña (born 3 September 1995) is a Chilean footballer who plays as a midfielder for Audax Italiano.

== Club career ==
Born in San Ramón commune, Santiago de Chile, Orellana is a product of Colo-Colo.

== International career ==
Orellana represented Chile U20 at the 2014 Aspire Four Nations International Tournament in Qatar.

== Style of play ==
A left-footed player, Orellana has developed his career as a forward. However, he turned into a midfielder since the 2025 season.

== Honours ==
Colo-Colo

- Primera división de Chile (2): 2014, 2017
- Supercopa de Chile: 2018
