= Mauricio Godoy =

Chilean footballer (born 1997)

Personal information
- Full name: Bastián Felipe Solano Molina
- Date of birth: 2 April 1997 (age 29)
- Place of birth: Saavedra, Chile
- Height: 1.71 m (5 ft 7 in)
- Position: Winger

Team information
- Current team: San Marcos
- Number: 11

Youth career
- Huachipato

Senior career*
Years	Team	Apps	(Gls)
2017–	Huachipato	4	(0)
2019–	→ San Marcos (loan)	13	(1)
- * Club domestic league appearances and goals as of 17 April 2020

Mauricio Godoy (born 2 April 1997) is a Chilean footballer who plays as a winger for San Marcos on loan from Huachipato.
