= Braian Molina =

Argentine footballer

Personal information
- Full name: Braian Nicolás Molina
- Date of birth: 17 April 1995 (age 31)
- Place of birth: Moreno, Buenos Aires, Argentina
- Height: 1.83 m (6 ft 0 in)
- Position: Centre back

Team information
- Current team: Sarmiento de La Banda

Senior career*
Years	Team	Apps	(Gls)
2016–2017	Instituto	4	(0)
2017–2018	Venados	37	(2)
2019	Ñublense	16	(0)
2020	Macará	27	(3)
2021	Deportivo Morón	14	(0)
2021–2022	Marathón	26	(1)
2023–2024	Central Norte		
2025	San Martín de Burzaco		
2026–	Sarmiento de La Banda		
- * Club domestic league appearances and goals as of 8 December 2024

Braian Nicolás Molina (born 17 April 1995) is an Argentine footballer who plays as a defender for Sarmiento de La Banda.

In addition to Argentina, he has played in Mexico, Chile, Ecuador and Honduras.
