= Fernando Felicevich =

Argentine football agent

Fernando Felicevich is an Argentine football agent.

== Career ==
Felicevich has represented Chile internationals Alexis Sánchez and Charles Aránguiz as an agent.
