= Mikel Arguinarena =

Chilean footballer (born 1991)

Personal information
- Full name: Mikel Arguinarena Lara
- Date of birth: June 27, 1991 (age 35)
- Place of birth: Melipilla, Chile
- Height: 1.71 m (5 ft 7 1/2 in)
- Position: Midfielder

Team information
- Current team: Deportes Recoleta

Youth career
- Universidad Católica
- 2009: Reggina
- 2010: Real Sociedad
- 2010–2011: Universidad de Chile

Senior career*
Years	Team	Apps	(Gls)
2012	Provincial Talagante	–	(–)
2013–2015	Barnechea	43	(5)
2015	Everton	9	(0)
2015–2017	Huachipato	13	(0)
2016–2017	→ Curicó Unido (loan)	21	(1)
2017	→ Barnechea (loan)	4	(0)
2019–2020	Barnechea	44	(0)
2021	Magallanes	20	(1)
2022	Barnechea	32	(3)
2023–2024	San Marcos	56	(7)
2025–	Deportes Recoleta	0	(0)
- * Club domestic league appearances and goals as of 6 January 2024

Mikel Arguinarena Lara (born 27 June 1991) is a Chilean footballer who plays for Deportes Recoleta as a midfielder.

== Career ==
As a youth player, Arguinarena was with both Universidad Católica and Universidad de Chile in his homeland. Abroad, he was with Reggina in Italy and Real Sociedad in Spain.

In 2025, Arguinarena signed with Deportes Recoleta.
