= José González (Chilean footballer) =

Chilean footballer and manager (born 1939)

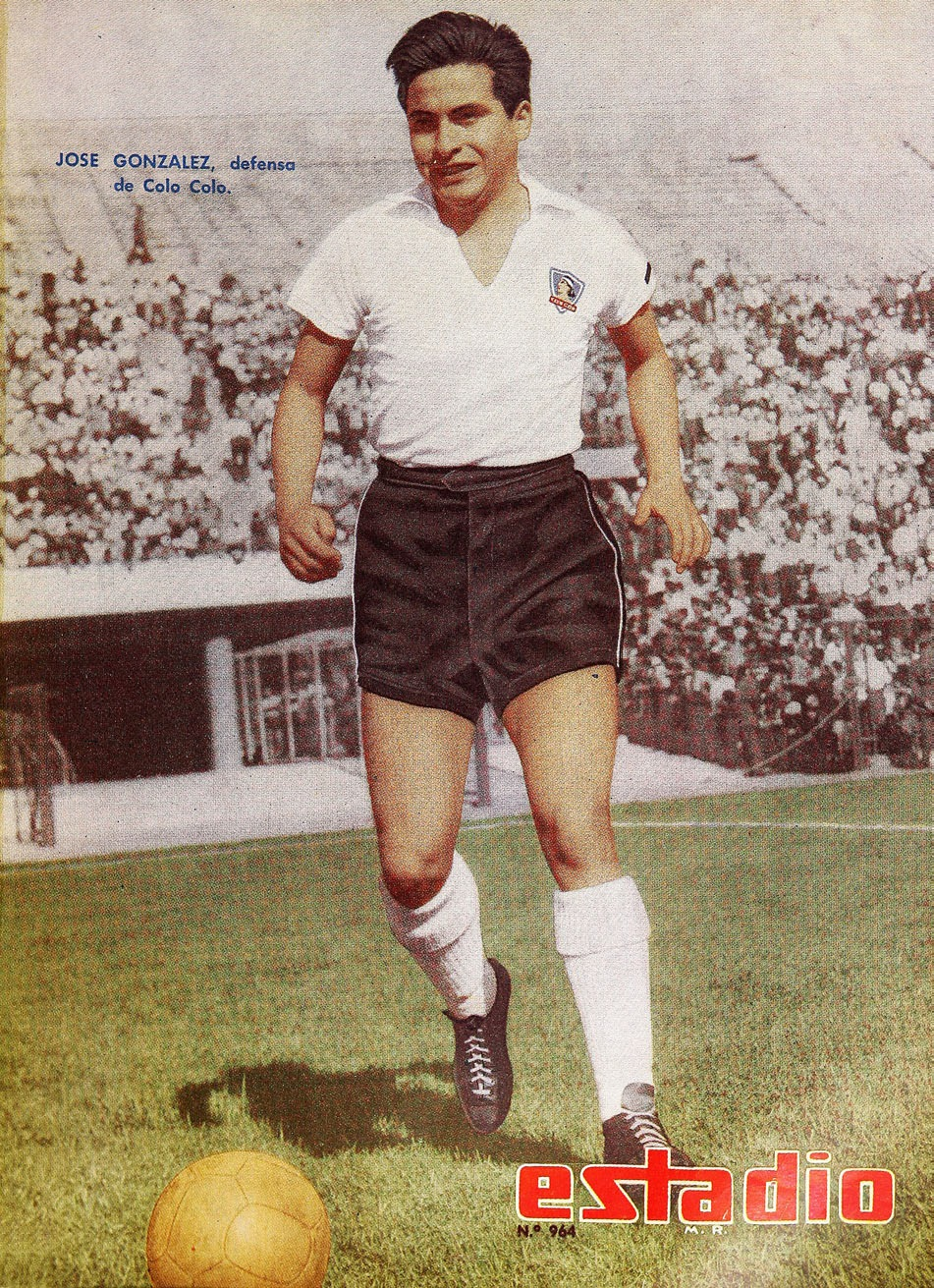
- Colo-Colo left back defender throughout his football career.

Personal information
- Full name: José Eugenio González Pardo
- Date of birth: 7 September 1939 (age 87)
- Place of birth: Santiago, Chile
- Height: 1.70 m (5 ft 7 in)
- Position: Defender

Youth career
- 1949–1959: Colo-Colo

Senior career*
Years	Team	Apps	(Gls)
1960–1969	Colo-Colo	148	(5)

International career
1963–1966	Chile	9	(0)

Managerial career
- 1975: Colo-Colo (caretaker)
- 1995: Unión La Calera
- * Club domestic league appearances and goals

José Eugenio González Pardo (born 7 September 1939) is a Chilean former footballer and manager. He played as a left back.

== Honours ==
=== Club ===
==== Player ====
Colo-Colo

- Campeonato Nacional (Chile) (3): 1960, 1963
- Copa Chile: 1960
