= Yerko Águila =

Chilean footballer (born 1996)

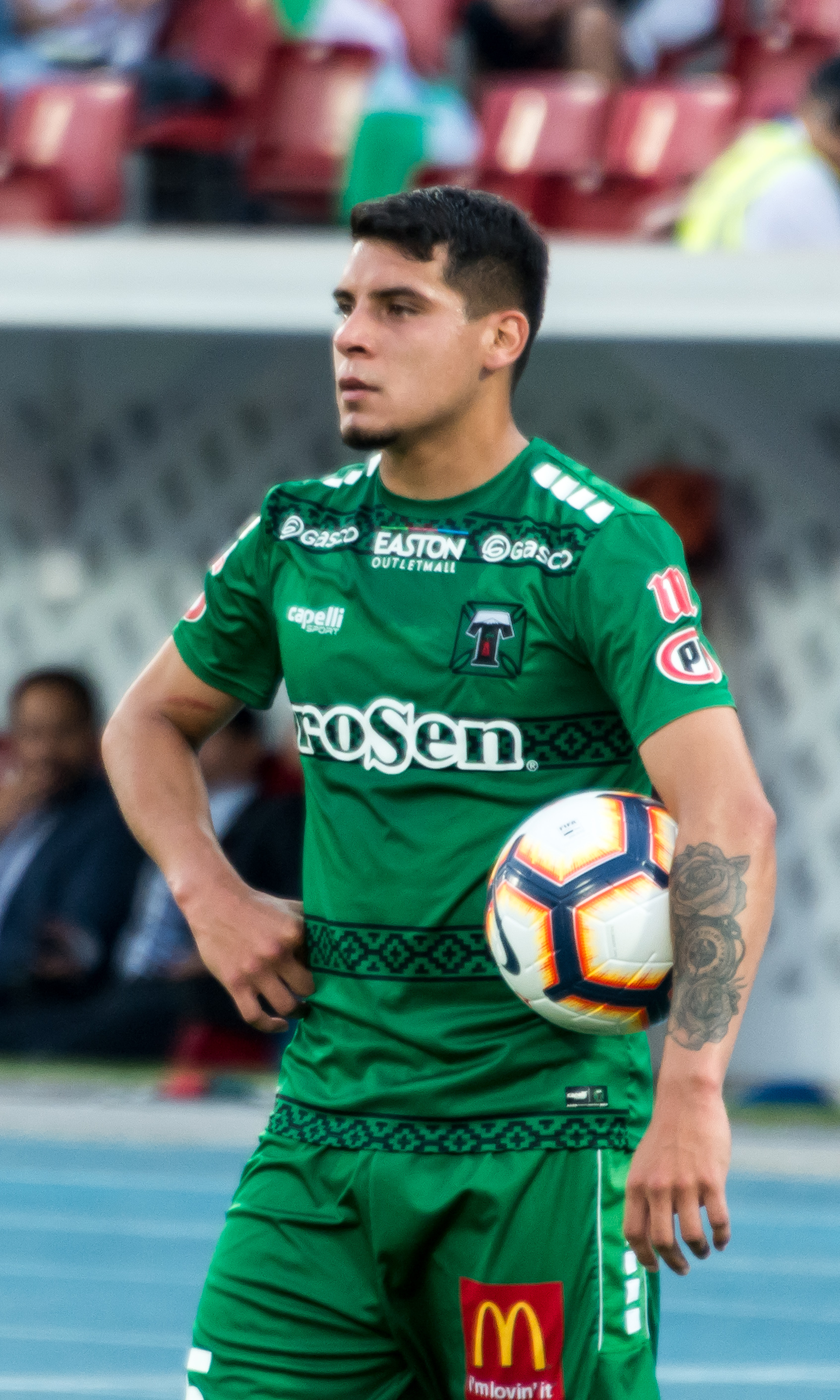
- Águila with Deportes Temuco in 2020

Personal information
- Full name: Yerko Mauricio Águila Bastías
- Date of birth: 31 May 1996 (age 30)
- Place of birth: Santiago, Chile
- Height: 1.74 m (5 ft 9 in)
- Position: Defender

Team information
- Current team: San Marcos
- Number: 3

Senior career*
Years	Team	Apps	(Gls)
2014	Unión Temuco	1	(0)
2014-2022	Deportes Temuco	98	(6)
2023–2024	Cobreloa	39	(0)
2025	San Luis	15	(1)
2026–	San Marcos	0	(0)
- * Club domestic league appearances and goals as of 25 December 2025

Yerko Mauricio Águila Bastías (born 31 May 1996) is a Chilean footballer who plays as a defender for San Marcos de Arica.

== Career ==
In 2025, Águila signed with San Luis de Quillota from Cobreloa. The next year, he switched to San Marcos de Arica.

== Personal life ==
He is the son of former footballer Víctor Águila.
