= Alfonso Urbina =

Chilean footballer (born 1993)

Personal information
- Full name: Alfonso Javier Urbina Milla
- Date of birth: 18 May 1993 (age 33)
- Place of birth: Viña del Mar, Chile
- Height: 1.75 m (5 ft 9 in)
- Position: Midfielder

Youth career
- Everton

Senior career*
Years	Team	Apps	(Gls)
2012–2016	Everton	30	(0)
2016–2017	Barnechea	39	(10)
2018	Venados	9	(0)
2018–2019	Barnechea	23	(1)
2020–2021	Deportes Vallenar	22	(0)
- * Club domestic league appearances and goals as of 13 September 2022

Alfonso Javier Urbina Milla (born 18 May 1993) is a Chilean footballer who plays as a midfielder.
