= Joaquín Díaz =

Joaquín Díaz may refer to:

- Joaquín Díaz Besoaín (1847–1924), Chilean politician
- Joaquín Díaz Bonilla (born 1989), Argentine rugby union player
- Joaquín Díaz Garcés (1877–1921), Chilean writer and journalist, first editor of Las Últimas Noticias
- Joaquín Díaz González (born 1947), Spanish ethnomusicologist and performer
- Joaquín Díaz Mena (born 1974), Mexican politician, governor of Yucatán since 2024
- Joaquín Díaz de Vivar (1907–2002), Argentine lawyer and Peronist politician
- Joaquín Carlos Díaz (1948–2015), Cuban chess International Master
