= Ignacio Lemmo =

Uruguayan footballer (born 1990)

Personal information
- Full name: Ignacio Nicolás Lemmo Gervasio
- Date of birth: 13 January 1990 (age 36)
- Place of birth: Montevideo, Uruguay
- Height: 1.71 m (5 ft 7 in)
- Position: Forward

Senior career*
Years	Team	Apps	(Gls)
2008–2013	Miramar Misiones	78	(16)
2012–2013	→ Bella Vista (loan)	19	(2)
2014	Progreso	13	(4)
2014–2015	Canadian	28	(14)
2015–2016	Rentistas	4	(1)
2016–2018	Progreso	74	(24)
2017	→ Racing Montevideo (loan)	3	(0)
2019–2022	Deportes Puerto Montt	91	(24)
2021	→ Unión Española (loan)	12	(4)
2023	Deportes Santa Cruz	27	(9)
2024	Progreso	32	(7)
2025	Deportes Recoleta	15	(2)
- * Club domestic league appearances and goals as of 27 June 2025

Ignacio Nicolás Lemmo Gervasio (born 13 January 1990) is an Uruguayan footballer who plays as a forward.

== Career ==
In 2024, Lemmo returned to Uruguay and joined Progreso. The next year, he moved to Chile again to play for Deportes Recoleta.
