= Bryan Taiva =

Chilean footballer (born 1995)

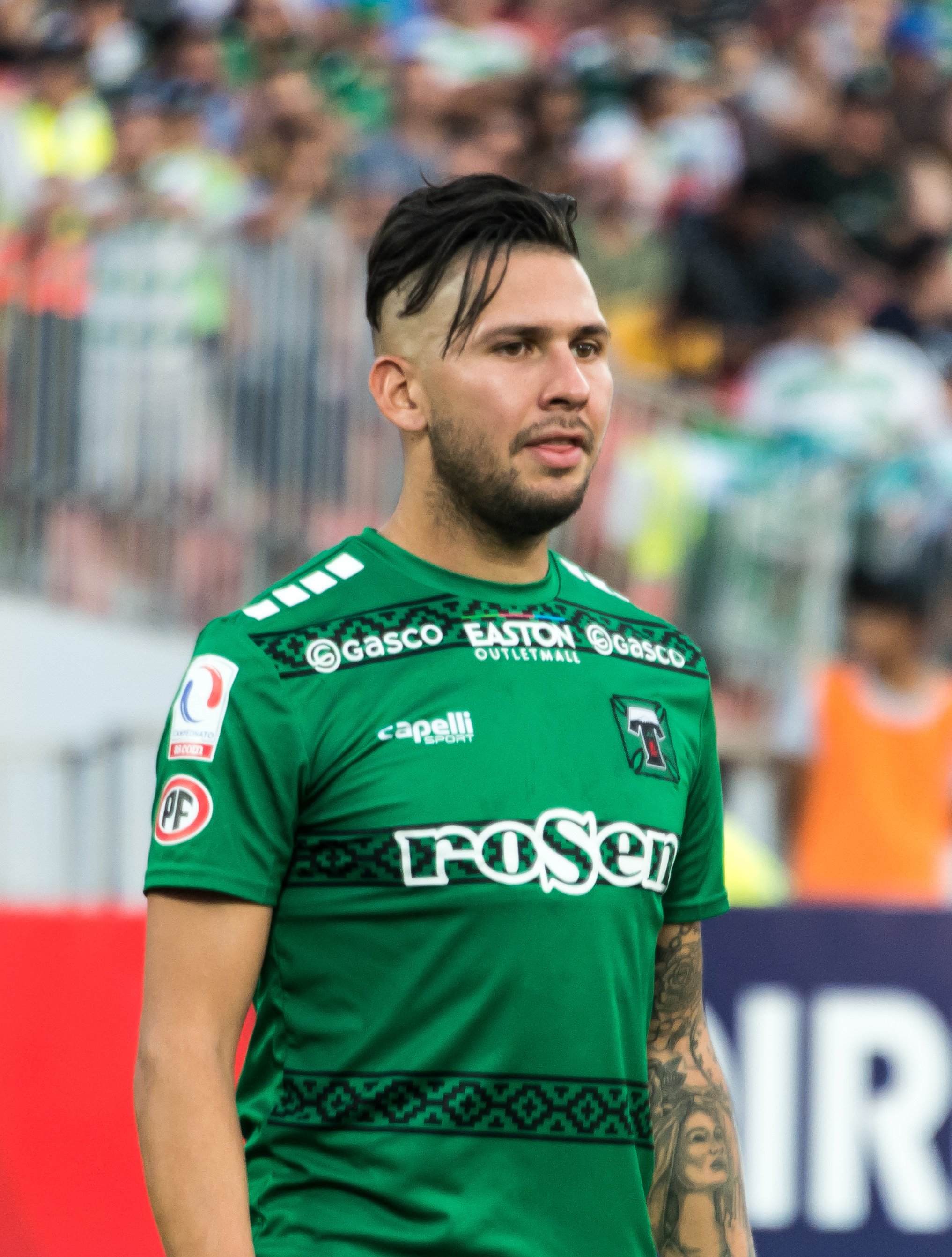
- Taiva with Deportes Temuco in 2020

Personal information
- Full name: Bryan Danilo Taiva Lobos
- Date of birth: 17 June 1995 (age 31)
- Place of birth: Santiago, Chile
- Height: 1.79 m (5 ft 10 1/2 in)
- Position: Striker

Team information
- Current team: Deportes Puerto Montt

Youth career
- Colo-Colo
- Universidad de Chile

Senior career*
Years	Team	Apps	(Gls)
2014–2018	Universidad de Chile	2	(2)
2017	→ San Marcos (loan)	10	(1)
2017	→ San Luis (loan)	3	(1)
2019–2020	Deportes Temuco	30	(3)
2021–2022	Deportes Santa Cruz	46	(6)
2023–2024	Deportes Melipilla	49	(27)
2025	Santiago Morning	12	(4)
2026	Santiago City	8	(5)
2026–	Deportes Puerto Montt	0	(0)

International career
2014	Chile U20		
- * Club domestic league appearances and goals as of 22 June 2026

Bryan Danilo Taiva Lobos (born 17 June 1995) is a Chilean footballer who currently plays as a striker for Deportes Puerto Montt.

== Career ==
As a youth player, Taiva was with Colo-Colo and Universidad de Chile. After, he played for San Marcos de Arica (loan), San Luis de Quillota (loan), Deportes Temuco and Deportes Santa Cruz.

In 2023, he joined Deportes Melipilla in the Segunda División Profesional.

In 2026, Taiva joined Santiago City. He switched to Deportes Puerto Montt in June of the same year.

== International career ==
Taiva represented Chile U20 at the 2014 Aspire Four Nations International Tournament in Qatar.
