= Estadio Municipal Joaquín Muñoz García =

Coordinates: 34.64°S 71.37°W

- Interactive map of Estadio Municipal Joaquín Muñoz García
- Location: Santa Cruz, Chile
- Owner: Municipality of Santa Cruz
- Capacity: 6,000
- Surface: grass

Tenant
- Deportes Santa Cruz

Estadio Municipal Joaquín Muñoz García is a sports venue located in Santa Cruz, Chile, Province of Colchagua. It was inaugurated in 1920, being one of Chile's oldest stadiums. It bears the name in honor to Joaquín Muñoz García, one of Deportes Santa Cruz founders, who donated the land for the stadium's construction.

The stadium holds 6,000 people.
