= Alexander Corro =

Argentine footballer

Personal information
- Full name: Alexander Leonel Corro
- Date of birth: 27 January 1988 (age 38)
- Place of birth: Buenos Aires, Argentina
- Height: 1.75 m (5 ft 9 in)
- Position: Defensive midfielder

Senior career*
Years	Team	Apps	(Gls)
2005–2009	Atlanta	44	(0)
2008	→ Arsenal de Sarandí (loan)	1	(0)
2009	Deportivo Merlo	0	(0)
2010	Unión Magdalena	27	(3)
2011–2012	Cobreloa	9	(0)
2012–2013	Sarmiento de Junín	0	(0)
2013	Deportes Quindío	8	(0)
2014–2015	El Tanque Sisley	2	(0)
2016–2017	Libertad de Sunchales	10	(0)
2017–2018	San Lorenzo de Alem	16	(2)
2018	Cobresal	30	(1)
2019–2020	Ñublense	16	(0)
2020–2021	Deportes Puerto Montt	1	(0)
- * Club domestic league appearances and goals as of 29 October 2020

Alexander Leonel Corro (born 27 January 1988) is an Argentine professional footballer who plays as a defensive midfielder.

== Honours ==
Cobreloa

- Primera División de Chile: runner-up 2011 Clausura
