= Óscar Ortega =

Argentine footballer

Personal information
- Full name: Óscar Horacio Ortega Magliano
- Date of birth: 3 May 1990 (age 36)
- Place of birth: Beravebú, Caseros, Argentina
- Height: 1.75 m (5 ft 9 in)
- Position: Forward

Team information
- Current team: Gödeken
- Number: 10

Youth career
- 9 de Julio Berabevú

Senior career*
Years	Team	Apps	(Gls)
2008–2011	9 de Julio Berabevú	–	(–)
2012	Santiago Morning	32	(15)
2013	Unión Temuco	9	(1)
2013–2014	Deportes Temuco	27	(6)
2014–2024	Santiago Morning	230	(64)
2020	→ Ñublense (loan)	25	(10)
2025	Huachipato	9	(0)
2026–	Gödeken	–	(–)
- * Club domestic league appearances and goals as of 11 December 2025

Óscar Horacio Ortega Magliano (born 3 May 1990) is an Argentine footballer who plays as a forward for Gödeken.

== Career ==
Born in Berabevú, Santa Fe, Argentina, Ortega played for the local team, 9 de Julio, before joining Chilean club Santiago Morning in 2012 thanks to Ricardo Lunari. He played for multiple teams across Chile, including transfers to Unión Temuco and Deportes Temuco, as well as a loan spell to Ñublense. A historical player for them, he renewed his contract in December 2022 on a two-years deal.

Ortega joined Huachipato for the 2025 season.

Back to Argentina, Ortega joined Club Social y Deportivo Gödeken in December 2025.

== Personal life ==
Before moving to Chile, Ortega worked in building and traffic signs.

== Honours ==
Huachipato

- Copa Chile: 2025
