= Luis Bustamante (footballer) =

Argentine professional football player

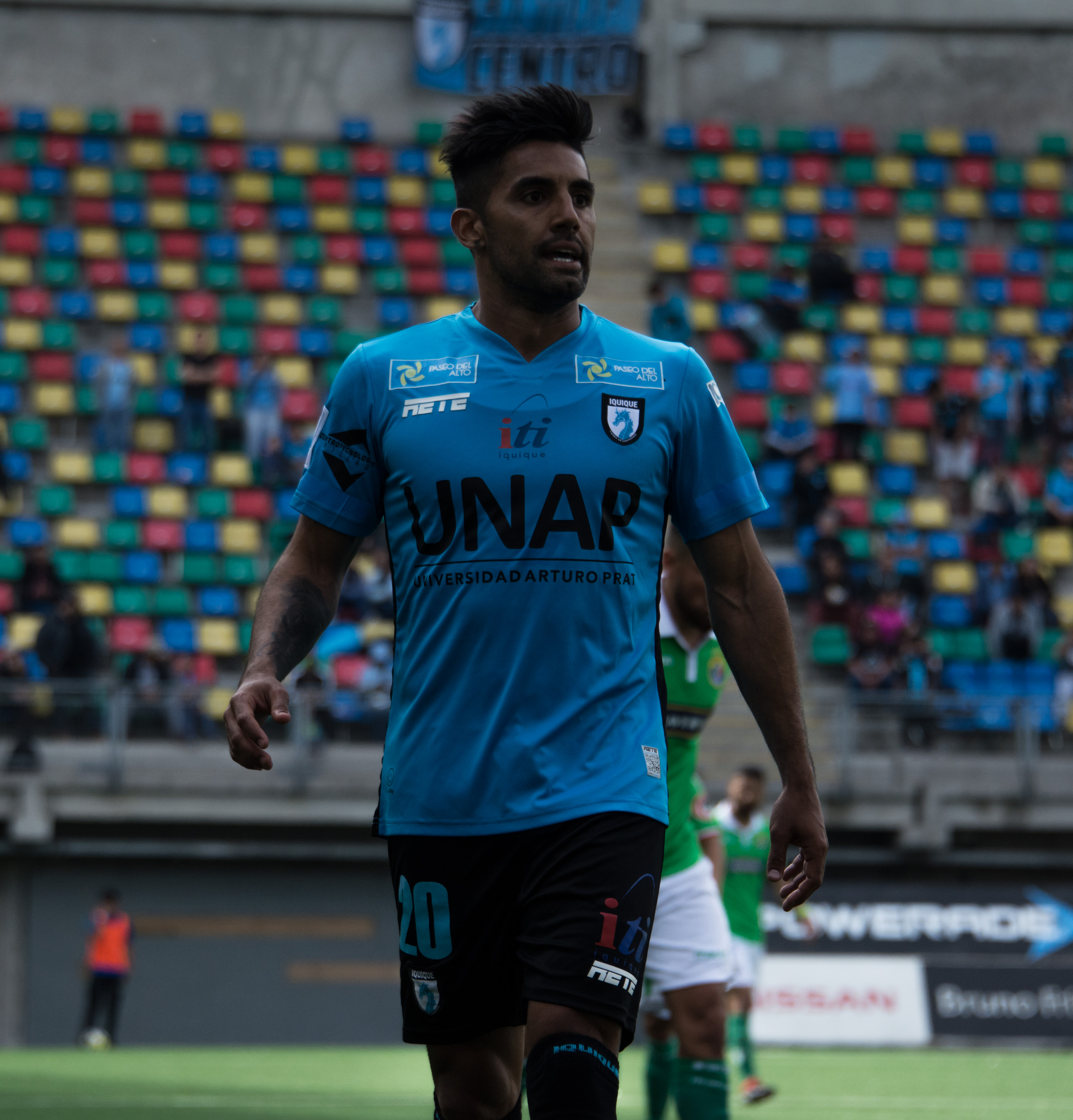
- Bustamante with Deportes Iquique in 2018

Personal information
- Full name: Luis Gonzalo Bustamante
- Date of birth: 11 December 1985 (age 40)
- Place of birth: Cordoba, Argentina
- Height: 1.70 m (5 ft 7 in)
- Position: Midfielder

Youth career
- Instituto

Senior career*
Years	Team	Apps	(Gls)
2003–2004	Instituto	37	(3)
2004–2011	Atalaya	0	(0)
2004–2005	→ Instituto (loan)	4	(0)
2005–2006	→ Talleres (loan)	32	(2)
2007–2009	→ Los Andes (loan)	82	(8)
2009–2010	→ Évian (loan)	15	(1)
2010–2011	→ Chacarita Juniors (loan)	27	(2)
2011–2012	Defensa y Justicia	36	(6)
2012–2013	Atlético Tucumán	33	(2)
2013–2014	Defensa y Justicia	26	(1)
2014	All Boys	15	(3)
2015	Levadiakos	11	(1)
2015–2018	Deportes Iquique	90	(16)
2019	Curicó Unido	9	(0)
2020–2021	Magallanes	14	(2)
- * Club domestic league appearances and goals

Luis Gonzalo Bustamante (born December 11, 1985), known as Gonzalo Bustamante, is an Argentine formner professional footballer who played as a midfielder.

He first played on the professional level in Primera División Argentina for Instituto.

== Career ==
A product of Instituto, Bustamante moved to Atalaya as part of a negotiation with businessman Carlos Granero and stayed with Instituto for the 2004–05 season.

Bustamante ended his career in Chile with Magallanes after standing out with Deportes Iquique and Curicó Unido.

== Coaching career ==
In 2023, Bustamante started to coach youth players from club DIEF in his hometown.
