= Enzo Ruiz (Uruguayan footballer) =

Uruguayan footballer (born 1988)

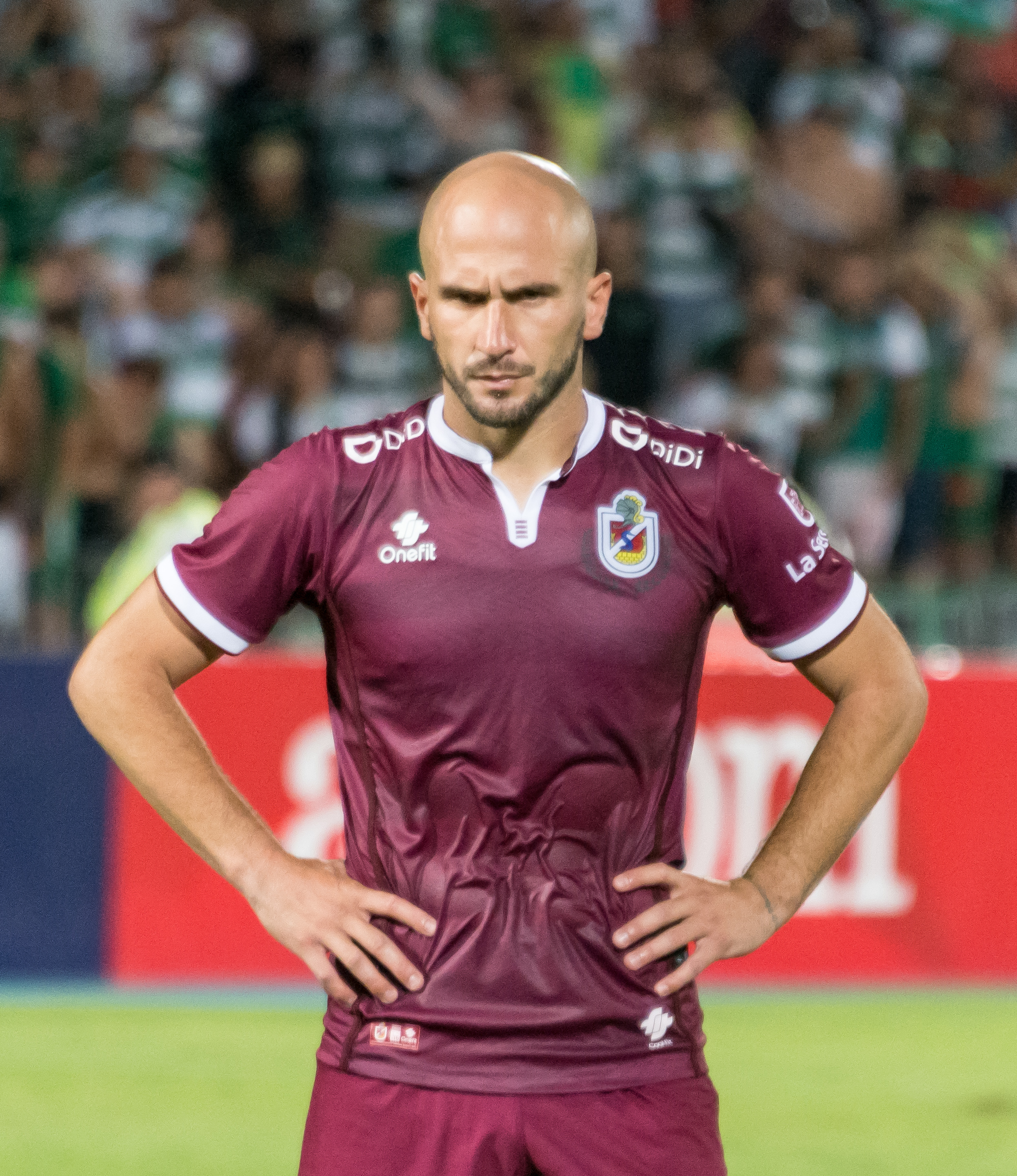

Personal information
- Full name: Enzo Daniel Ruiz Eizaga
- Date of birth: 31 August 1988 (age 38)
- Place of birth: Mercedes, Uruguay
- Height: 1.81 m (5 ft 11 1/2 in)
- Position: Left-back

Youth career
- Peñarol

Senior career*
Years	Team	Apps	(Gls)
2007–2008	Peñarol	4	(0)
2009–2010	Grasshopper II	18	(2)
2009–2011	Grasshopper	17	(0)
2011–2013	Bellinzona	24	(2)
2012	→ Luzern (loan)	2	(0)
2013–2015	Racing de Montevideo	12	(1)
2014–2016	Deportes Concepción	66	(3)
2016	Villa Española	14	(0)
2016–2017	San Marcos	22	(0)
2018–2020	Deportes La Serena	59	(14)
2020–2021	Rangers	13	(0)
2021	Lautaro de Buin	0	(0)
2021	Deportes Iquique	9	(1)
2022	Deportes Melipilla	13	(0)
Total		273	(23)

International career
2007	Uruguay U20	1	(0)
- * Club domestic league appearances and goals

Enzo Daniel Ruiz Eizaga (born 31 August 1988) is an Uruguayan naturalized Chilean former footballer who played as a defender.

== Club career ==
Ruiz started his career playing with the Uruguayan giant C.A. Peñarol. He made his first team debut in the hands of Gregorio Pérez.

He was signed by the Swiss giant club Grasshopper in February 2009.

In July 2011, he signed a three-year contract with the Swiss Challenge League side AC Bellinzona.

In June 2012, it was announced that he was sent off on loan for one season to Swiss Super League side FC Luzern.

In August 2013, he returned to his country to play for Racing Club de Montevideo.

On 2021 season, he joined the club recently promoted to Primera B, Lautaro de Buin.

He retired at the end of the 2022 season as a player of Deportes Melipilla.

== International career ==
Ruiz played for Uruguay U20 at 2007 FIFA U-20 World Cup in Canada.
