= Nicolás Gauna =

Argentine footballer

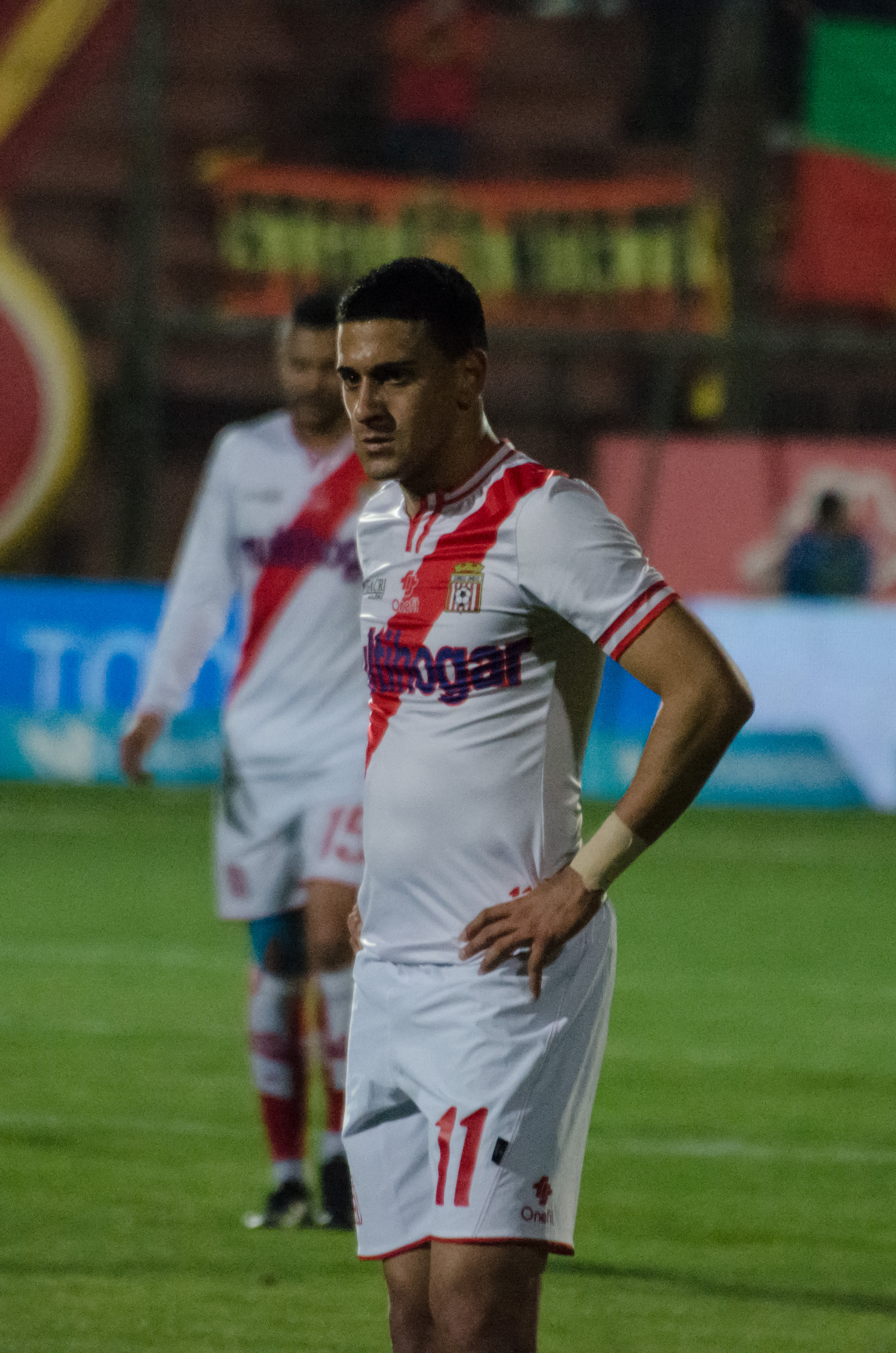
- Gauna with Curicó Unido in 2018

Personal information
- Full name: Nicolás Arturo Gauna
- Date of birth: 3 April 1992 (age 34)
- Place of birth: Buenos Aires, Argentina
- Height: 1.77 m (5 ft 10 in)
- Position: Midfielder

Team information
- Current team: San Marcos

Youth career
- Boca Juniors

Senior career*
Years	Team	Apps	(Gls)
2011–2013	Sportivo Italiano	25	(1)
2013–2014	Ituzaingó	35	(1)
2014–2015	Acassuso	11	(0)
2015–2016	Juventud Unida (G)	11	(0)
2016–2017	Colegiales	32	(3)
2017–2018	Curicó Unido	39	(2)
2018–2021	Deportes Puerto Montt	83	(16)
2022	Coquimbo Unido	21	(1)
2023	Cobreloa	19	(1)
2024–	San Marcos	0	(0)
- * Club domestic league appearances and goals as of 8 January 2024

Nicolás Arturo Gauna (born 3 April 1992) is an Argentine professional footballer who plays as a midfielder for Primera B de Chile side San Marcos de Arica.

== Career ==
A product of the Boca Juniors youth system, he made his professional debut playing for Sportivo Italiano in the Primera B Metropolitana and went on his career playing for several clubs in minor categories of the Argentine football until he joined Curicó Unido in the Chilean Primera División on second half 2017. After a productive path with Deportes Puerto Montt, he joined Coquimbo Unido for the 2022 season.

For the 2023 season, he signed with Cobreloa in the Primera B de Chile. The next season, he switched to San Marcos de Arica.

== Honours ==
Cobreloa

- Primera B de Chile: 2023
