= Sebastián Leyton =

Chilean footballer (born 1993)

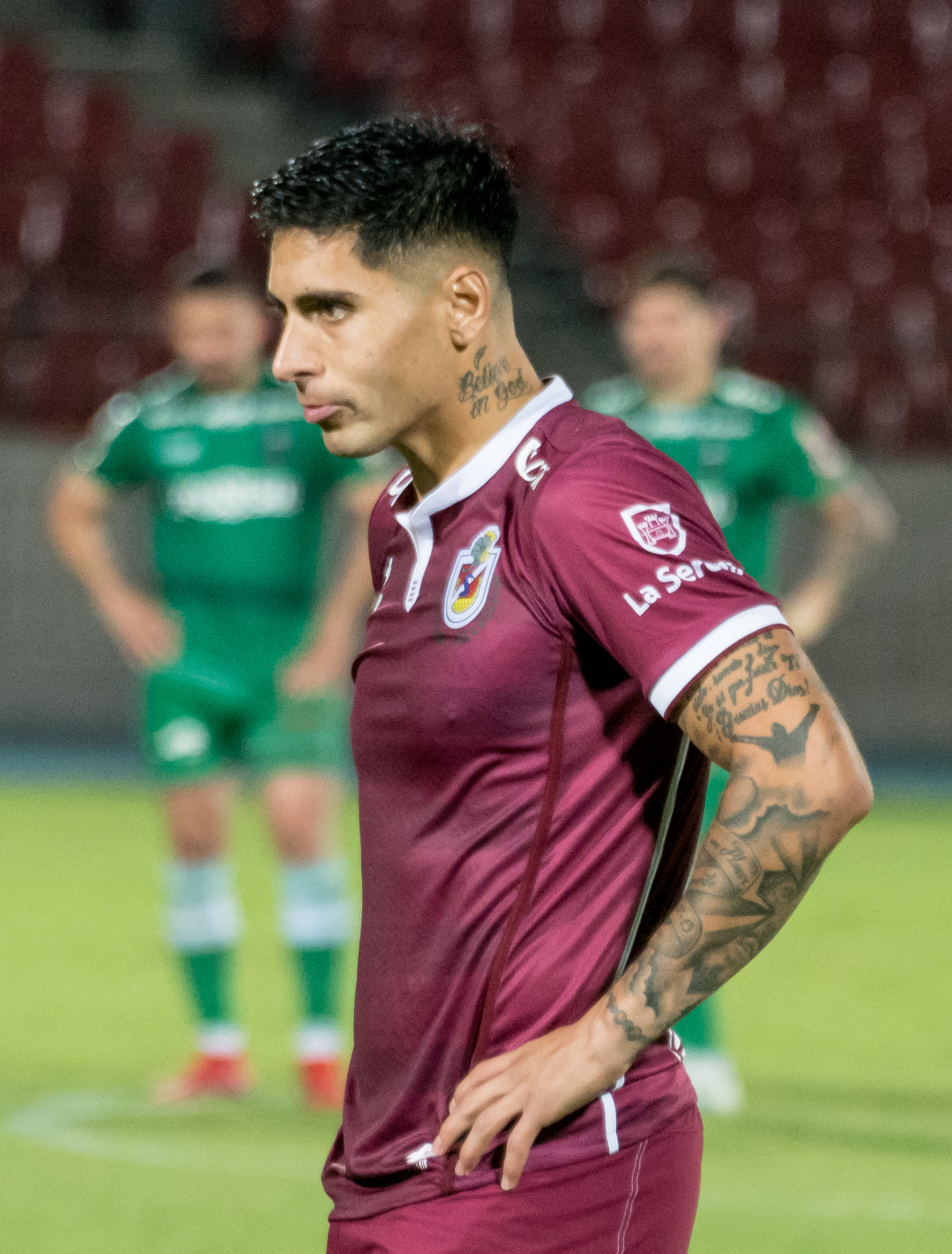
- Leyton with Deportes La Serena in 2020

Personal information
- Full name: Sebastián Ignacio Leyton Hevia
- Date of birth: 13 May 1993 (age 33)
- Place of birth: Curicó, Chile
- Height: 1.77 m (5 ft 10 in)
- Position: Midfielder

Team information
- Current team: Deportes Antofagasta

Youth career
- Universidad de Chile

Senior career*
Years	Team	Apps	(Gls)
2011–2013	Universidad de Chile	6	(0)
2013	→ Deportes La Serena (loan)	9	(0)
2013–2015	Curicó Unido	62	(5)
2015–2016	Deportes Antofagasta	25	(2)
2016–2018	Everton	30	(1)
2019	Unión La Calera	8	(1)
2020–2021	Deportes La Serena	31	(8)
2022	Deportivo Cali	14	(2)
2022–2024	Unión Española	44	(0)
2025	Rangers	29	(5)
2026–	Deportes Antofagasta	0	(0)
- * Club domestic league appearances and goals as of 31 December 2025

Sebastián Ignacio Leyton Hevia (born 13 May 1993) is a Chilean footballer who plays as a midfielder for Deportes Antofagasta.

== Career ==
He debuted on 15 April 2011, in a 2–0 victory of Universidad de Chile against Unión La Calera for the 2011 Torneo Apertura.

In 2022, he moved to Colombia and joined Deportivo Cali, returning to Chile in the second half of the year to join Unión Española.

In 2025, Leyton joined Rangers de Talca. The next season, he switched to Deportes Antofagasta.

== Honours ==
Universidad de Chile

- Primera División de Chile (3): 2011 Apertura, 2011 Clausura, 2012 Apertura
- Copa Sudamericana (1): 2011
