= Luca Pontigo =

Chilean footballer (born 1994)

Personal information
- Full name: Luca Alonso Pontigo Marín
- Date of birth: 25 November 1994 (age 31)
- Place of birth: Santiago, Chile
- Height: 1.74 m (5 ft 9 in)
- Position: Striker

Team information
- Current team: Lota Schwager
- Number: 25

Youth career
- 1998–2011: Colo-Colo

Senior career*
Years	Team	Apps	(Gls)
2012–2013	Colo-Colo B	35	(21)
2012–2017	Colo-Colo	1	(0)
2014	→ Magallanes (loan)	18	(2)
2014–2015	→ Rangers (loan)	13	(1)
2015–2016	→ Iberia (loan)	5	(0)
2016–2017	→ Independiente Cauquenes (loan)	17	(3)
2017–2018	Real San Joaquín	–	(–)
2018–2019	Deportes Santa Cruz	49	(20)
2020–2021	Deportes Copiapó	26	(9)
2021	Coquimbo Unido	19	(0)
2022–2023	Deportes Copiapó	27	(4)
2024	San Antonio Unido	15	(1)
2025	Población Los Nogales	–	(–)
2026–	Lota Schwager	0	(0)

International career
2010	Chile U17		
- * Club domestic league appearances and goals as of 24 January 2026

Luca Alonso Pontigo Marín (Spanish pronunciation: [ˈluka ponˈtiɣo], born 25 November 1994) is a Chilean footballer who plays as a striker for Lota Schwager.

== Club career ==
In 2023, Pontigo played for Deportes Copiapó. the next year, he switched to San Antonio Unido in the Segunda División Profesional de Chile.

In 2026, Pontigo joined Lota Schwager in the Segunda División Profesional de Chile.

== International career ==
Pontigo represented Chile U17 at the 2010 South American Games.

== Career statistics ==
Club	Season	League		Cup		International		Total	
Club	Season	Apps	Goals	Apps	Goals	Apps	Goals	Apps	Goals
Colo-Colo B	2012	11	10	–	–	–	–	11	10
Colo-Colo B	Total	11	10	–	–	–	–	11	10
Colo-Colo	2012	1	0	1	2	–	–	2	2
Colo-Colo	Total	1	0	1	2	–	–	2	2
Career Total		12	10	1	2	–	–	13	12

== Honours ==
Deportes Santa Cruz

- Segunda División: 2018

Coquimbo Unido

- Primera B: 2021
