= Rodolfo González (footballer) =

Chilean footballer (born 1989)

- González with Cobreloa in 2009

Personal information
- Full name: Rodolfo Antonio González Aránguiz
- Date of birth: 28 February 1989 (age 37)
- Place of birth: Santiago, Chile
- Height: 1.80 m (5 ft 11 in)
- Position: Defender

Team information
- Current team: Cobreloa
- Number: 5

Youth career
- Cobreloa

Senior career*
Years	Team	Apps	(Gls)
2008–2015	Cobreloa	140	(5)
2013–2014	→ Rangers (loan)	31	(3)
2015–2016	Deportes Antofagasta	14	(0)
2017–2021	Cobresal	112	(4)
2022–	Cobreloa	27	(0)

International career
2008	Chile U18		
- * Club domestic league appearances and goals as of 20 February 2023

Rodolfo Antonio González Aránguiz (born 28 February 1989, in La Pintana, Santiago, Chile), is a Chilean professional footballer who plays as a defender. He currently plays for Primera B de Chile side Cobreloa, where he also serves as captain.

== International career ==
He was part of the Chile U-18 national team that won the João Havelange Tournament held in Mexico.

== Personal life ==
He is the father of the footballer Youssef González, who was promoted to the Cobreloa first team in 2026.

== Honours ==
Cobreloa

- Primera B de Chile (2): 2023, 2026

Chile U18

- João Havelange Tournament: 2008
