= Reiner Castro =

Venezuelan footballer (born 1994)

Personal information
- Full name: Reiner Alvey Castro Barrera
- Date of birth: 10 January 1994 (age 32)
- Place of birth: El Vigía, Venezuela
- Height: 1.69 m (5 ft 7 in)
- Position: Forward

Team information
- Current team: Deportes Puerto Montt
- Number: 11

Youth career
- Aldea Acuña
- 2011–2013: Atlético La Fría

Senior career*
Years	Team	Apps	(Gls)
2013	Atlético La Fría	–	(–)
2013–2014	Deportivo El Vígia	–	(–)
2014	Atlético El Vigía	–	(–)
2015–2016	Caracas B	–	(–)
2016–2018	Caracas	60	(15)
2018	→ Santiago Wanderers (loan)	31	(10)
2019–2022	Deportes Temuco	105	(24)
2023	Deportes Copiapó	14	(2)
2024	Universidad de Concepción	11	(7)
2025–	Deportes Puerto Montt	11	(5)
- * Club domestic league appearances and goals as of 14 November 2025

Reiner Alvey Castro Barrera (born 10 January 1994) is a Venezuelan footballer who plays as a forward for Chilean club Deportes Puerto Montt.

== Career ==
Trained at Aldea Acuña from Orope and Atlético La Fría, Castro started his career with them in the Venezuelan third level. After he played for Deportivo El Vígia and Atlético El Vigía before joining Caracas FC. He made appearances for the B-team in 2015–2016.

He was loaned to Santiago Wanderers from Caracas FC in 2018.

In 2023, Castro played for Deportes Copiapó. The next season, he switched to Universidad de Concepción.

In 2025, Castro joined Deportes Puerto Montt and won the 2025 Segunda División Profesional de Chile.

== Honours ==
Deportes Puerto Montt

- Segunda División Profesional de Chile: 2025
