= Nelson Sepúlveda =

Chilean footballer

Personal information
- Full name: Nelson Alejandro Sepúlveda Moya
- Date of birth: 22 February 1992 (age 34)
- Place of birth: Santiago, Chile
- Height: 1.67 m (5 ft 6 in)
- Position: Midfielder

Team information
- Current team: Deportes Antofagasta (on loan from Deportes Concepción)

Youth career
- Cobresal

Senior career*
Years	Team	Apps	(Gls)
2012–2018	Cobresal	115	(9)
2019–2021	Deportes Melipilla	75	(6)
2022–2024	Cobresal	65	(3)
2025–	Deportes Concepción	35	(2)
2026–	→ Deportes Antofagasta (loan)	0	(0)
- * Club domestic league appearances and goals as of 14 July 2026

Nelson Alejandro Sepúlveda Moya (born 22 February 1992) is a Chilean footballer who plays as a midfielder for Deportes Antofagasta on loan from Deportes Concepción.

== Club career ==
Born in Santiago de Chile, Sepúlveda is a product of Cobresal and made his professional debut in the 2012 Torneo Apertura of the Chilean Primera División, With them, he won the 2015 Torneo Clausura, the first league title for the club, and took part in the 2016 Copa Libertadores. He left them at the end of the 2018 season, getting promotion to the 2019 Primera División.

In January 2019, Sepúlveda moved to Deportes Melipilla, got promotion and played for them in the 2021 Primera División.

He rejoined Cobresal in 2022, took part in the 2023 Copa Sudamericana and they were the Chilean top division runners-up in 2023. On 15 March 2024, Sepúlveda suffered a serious crus fracture in the match against Deportes Iquique that kept him away from football for about five months.

In January 2025, Sepúlveda joined Deportes Concepción. After a disagreement with the coach, Fernando Díaz, he was loaned out to Deportes Antofagasta for the second half of 2026.
