= Estadio Municipal de Lo Barnechea =

Stadium in Santiago, Chile

Coordinates: 33.35°S 70.5°W

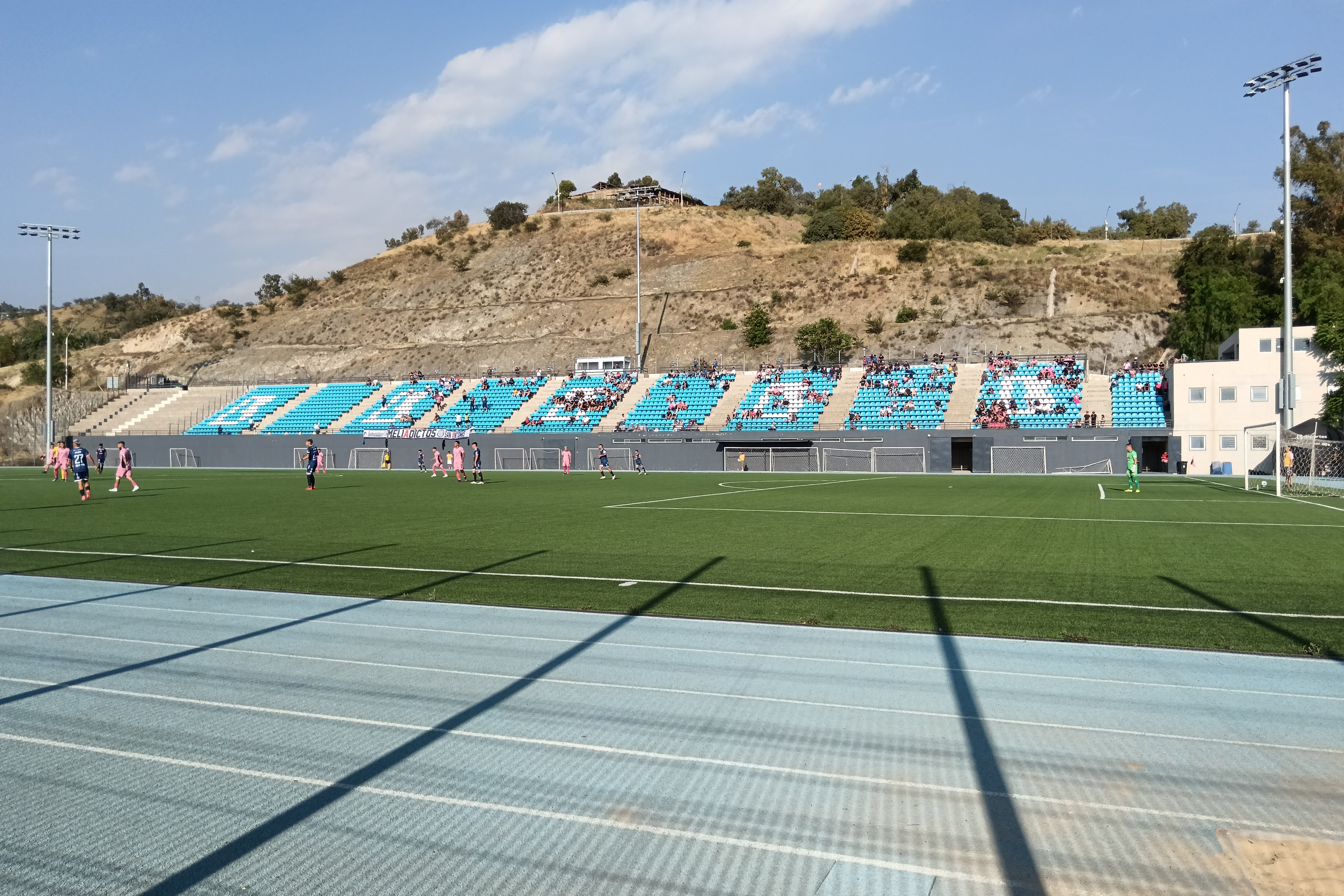
- Interactive map of Estadio Municipal de Lo Barnechea
- Location: Lo Barnechea, Santiago, Chile
- Owner: Municipality of Lo Barnechea
- Capacity: 2,500
- Surface: turf
- Field size: 105 x 68m

Tenant
- Barnechea

Estadio Municipal de Lo Barnechea is a stadium in Lo Barnechea, Santiago. It is Barnechea's home stadium.

The stadium holds 2,500 people.

The first football match played in the stadium was a 0–0 draw between Barnechea and Deportes Iberia.
