= David Escalante =

Argentine footballer (born 1991)

Personal information
- Full name: David Jonathan Escalante Ríos
- Date of birth: 21 May 1991 (age 35)
- Place of birth: Tres Isletas, Argentina
- Height: 1.88 m (6 ft 2 in)
- Position: Forward

Team information
- Current team: Acassuso

Youth career
- Independiente

Senior career*
Years	Team	Apps	(Gls)
2008–2011	Independiente	2	(0)
2011	→ San Telmo (loan)	34	(17)
2012–2018	Santiago Morning	162	(59)
2014–2015	→ Barnechea (loan)	13	(1)
2019–2021	Ñublense	47	(12)
2021–2024	Cobreloa	62	(20)
2024–2025	Curicó Unido	18	(3)
2025–	Acassuso	45	(16)
- * Club domestic league appearances and goals as of 16:48, 21 April 2026 (UTC)

David Jonathan Escalante Ríos (born 21 May 1991) is an Argentine professional footballer who plays for Acassuso.

== Career ==
He left Cobreloa after winning the 2023 Primera B de Chile and switched to Curicó Unido for the 2024 season.

== Honours ==
Independiente

- Copa Sudamericana: 2010

Ñublense

- Primera B: 2020

Cobreloa

- Primera B: 2023
