= Estadio Regional de Chinquihue =

Stadium in Puerto Montt, Chile

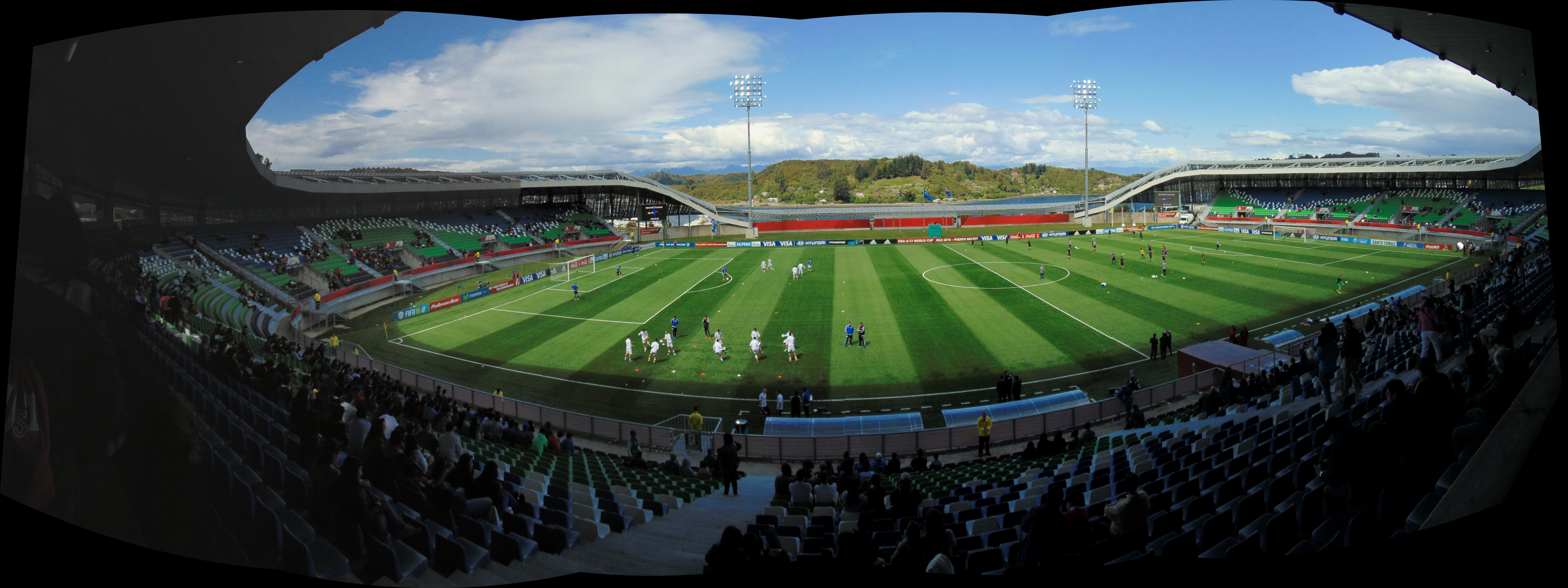
- Interactive map of Estadio Regional de Chinquihue
- Location: Puerto Montt, Chile
- Coordinates: 41°29′29.40″S 72°59′13.38″W
- Owner: Municipality of Puerto Montt
- Capacity: 10,000
- Surface: Artificial turf

Construction
- Opened: 1982
- Renovated: 2011, 2013

Tenant
- Deportes Puerto Montt

Estadio Regional de Chinquihue is a multi-purpose stadium in Puerto Montt, Chile. It is primarily used for football matches and serves as the home stadium of Deportes Puerto Montt. The stadium was built in 1982, with an original capacity of 11,300. In 2011 and 2013, it was completely renovated, and currently holds 10,000 people (all seated). The highest ever recorded attendance was 12,217 in a league match between Deportes Puerto Montt and Colo-Colo on September 6, 1998.
