= Estadio Parque Municipal =

Stadium in Valdivia, Chile

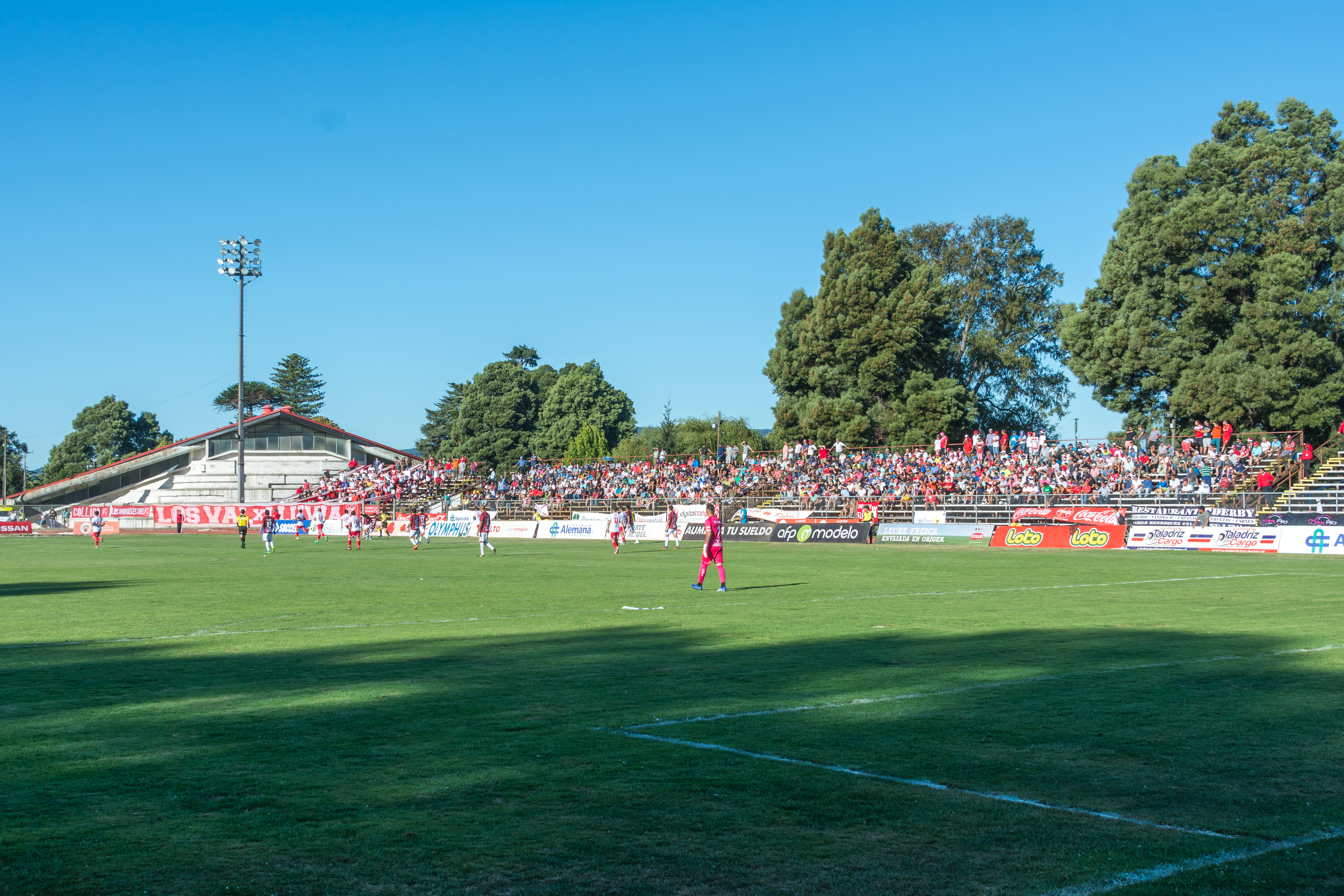
- Interactive map of Estadio Parque Municipal
- Location: Valdivia, Chile
- Coordinates: 39.8205°S 73.2334°W
- Owner: Municipality of Valdivia
- Capacity: 5,000
- Surface: grass
- Field size: 105 x 68 m

Construction
- Architect: Mario Recordón

Tenant
- Deportes Valdivia

Estadio Parque Municipal is a multi-use stadium in Valdivia, Chile. It's used mostly for football matches and is Deportes Valdivia's home stadium.

The stadium holds 5,000 people.
