= Estadio Municipal de San Felipe =

Stadium in San Felipe, Chile

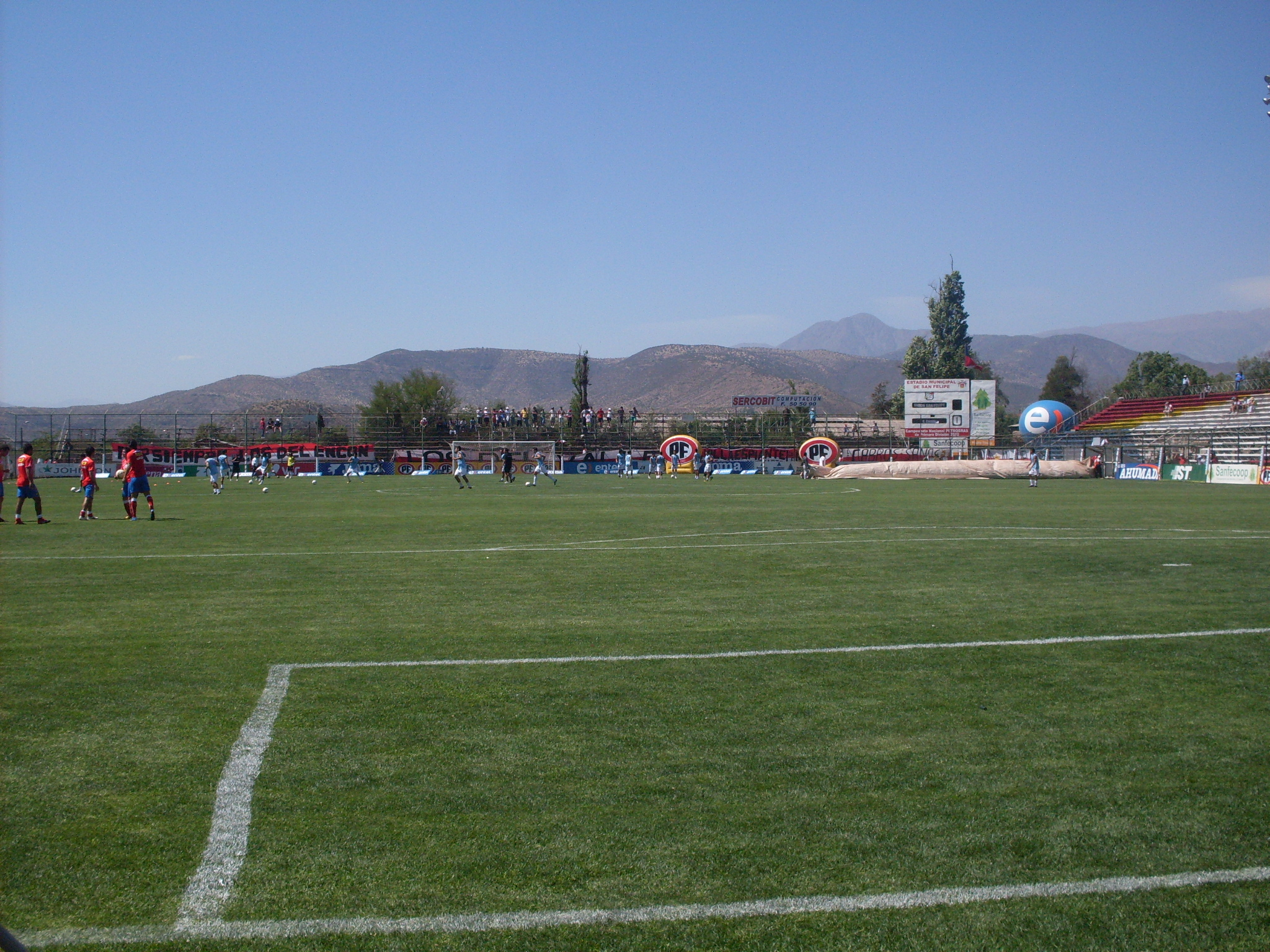
- Interactive map of Estadio Municipal de San Felipe
- Location: San Felipe, Chile
- Coordinates: 32°44′49″S 70°43′48″W
- Owner: Municipality of San Felipe
- Capacity: 12,000
- Field size: 105m × 68m

Construction
- Opened: 1958

Tenant
- Unión San Felipe

Estadio Municipal de San Felipe is a football stadium in San Felipe, Chile. It is the home stadium of Unión San Felipe. The stadium was opened in 1958, and currently holds 12,000 people.
