= 2021 Copa Chile =

Copa Chile Easy 2021

Tournament details
- Country: Chile
- Dates: 15 June – 4 September 2021
- Teams: 45

Final positions
- Champions: Colo-Colo (13th title)
- Runners-up: Everton
- Copa Libertadores: Everton

Tournament statistics
- Matches played: 73
- Goals scored: 182 (2.49 per match)
- Top goal scorer: Iván Morales (5 goals)

The 2021 Copa Chile (officially known as Copa Chile Easy 2021 due to its sponsorship), was the 41st edition of the Copa Chile, the country's national football cup tournament. The tournament began on 15 June 2021 during the mid-season break due to the 2021 Copa América and ended on 4 September 2021, with the final match on neutral ground. Colo-Colo were able to defend the title won in the previous edition of the competition, winning their thirteenth Copa Chile after beating Everton in the final by a 2–0 score.

== Format ==
The 2021 Copa Chile was based on a system of direct elimination with double-legged ties, similar to the Copa del Rey. In the first round, which was played with single-legged ties, clubs from the Primera B and Segunda División Profesional were paired against each other according to geographical criteria, where they played for 14 berths to the second round, in which the winners faced the Primera División clubs which joined the competition in that round. After the second round, and parallel to the Copa América, the round of 16 and the quarter-finals were played, with the semi-finals and final matches being played in late August and early September.

== Prizes ==
The champions of this edition (or the runners-up, if the champions had already qualified) were entitled to earn the right to compete in the 2022 Copa Libertadores, taking the Chile 4 berth, and also earned the right to play the 2022 Supercopa de Chile against the 2021 Campeonato Nacional champions.

== Schedule ==
Round	Draw date	First leg	Second leg
First round	11 June 2021 (originally 9 June 2021)	15–16 June 2021	
Second round	15 June 2021	21–30 June 2021	25 June – 5 July 2021
Round of 16	15 June 2021	30 June – 9 July 2021	3–12 July 2021
Quarter-finals	15 June 2021	8 July – 4 August 2021	11 July – 11 August 2021
Semi-finals	15 June 2021	18 August 2021	1 September 2021
Final	15 June 2021	4 September 2021	

== Teams ==
45 clubs took part in this edition of the Copa Chile: 17 from the Primera División, 16 from the Primera B, and 12 from the Segunda División Profesional.

=== Primera A ===
- Audax Italiano
- Cobresal
- Colo-Colo
- Curicó Unido
- Deportes Antofagasta
- Deportes La Serena
- Deportes Melipilla
- Everton
- Huachipato
- Ñublense
- O'Higgins
- Palestino
- Santiago Wanderers
- Unión Española
- Unión La Calera
- Universidad Católica
- Universidad de Chile

=== Primera B ===
- Barnechea
- Cobreloa
- Coquimbo Unido
- Deportes Copiapó
- Deportes Iquique
- Deportes Puerto Montt
- Deportes Santa Cruz
- Deportes Temuco
- Fernández Vial
- Magallanes
- Rangers
- San Luis
- San Marcos de Arica
- Santiago Morning
- Unión San Felipe
- Universidad de Concepción

=== Segunda División ===
- Colchagua
- Deportes Colina
- Deportes Concepción
- Deportes Limache
- Deportes Recoleta
- Deportes Valdivia
- General Velásquez
- Iberia
- Independiente de Cauquenes
- Lautaro de Buin
- Rodelindo Román
- San Antonio Unido

== First round ==
The pairings for the first round were announced by the ANFP on 11 June 2021. The 12 teams from the Segunda División and two Primera B teams were drawn against the remaining 14 Primera B teams, according to geographical and safety criteria. Similar to the previous edition, ties in this round were single-legged, with the team from the lower tier hosting the match. Matches in this round were played on 15 and 16 June 2021.

15 June 2021	Deportes Recoleta (3)	0–3; Awarded	San Luis (2)	Recoleta, Santiago
15:00	Silva 5'; Ramírez 35'; Rubio 63'	Report	Parada 9'	Stadium: Municipal de Recoleta; Attendance: 0 Referee: Fabián Aracena
Note: The match originally ended with Deportes Recoleta winning by a 3–1 score, however they were disqualified from the competition for fielding an ineligible player. Due to this, San Luis advanced to the second round.

15 June 2021	Deportes Limache (3)	1–4	Barnechea (2)	Quillota
15:00	Huerta 37'	Report	De Olivera 12', 41'; Espinoza 85'; Ponce 89'	Stadium: Municipal Lucio Fariña Fernández; Attendance: 0 Referee: Juan Sepúlveda

15 June 2021	Deportes Valdivia (3)	1–3	Deportes Puerto Montt (2)	Valdivia
15:00	Linares 52'	Report	López 22'; Melivilú 87'; Gallardo 90'	Stadium: Parque Municipal; Attendance: 0 Referee: Rafael Troncoso

15 June 2021	Rodelindo Román (3)	0–1	Coquimbo Unido (2)	La Pintana, Santiago
15:00		Report	Pontigo 80'	Stadium: Municipal de La Pintana; Attendance: 0 Referee: Omar Oporto

15 June 2021	Cobreloa (2)	2–1	Deportes Copiapó (2)	Calama
15:00	Césped 80'; Cortés 84'	Report	Soza 9'	Stadium: Zorros del Desierto; Attendance: 0 Referee: María Belén Carvajal

15 June 2021	Iberia (3)	0–1	Deportes Temuco (2)	Los Ángeles
15:00		Report	Alegre 4'	Stadium: Municipal de Los Ángeles; Attendance: 0 Referee: Cristián Andaur

15 June 2021	Colchagua (3)	1–6	Deportes Santa Cruz (2)	San Fernando
15:00	Fernández 81'	Report	Becica 18'; González 23', 25'; E. Flores 52'; Duma 60'; Pezoa 90'	Stadium: Municipal Jorge Silva; Attendance: 0 Referee: Miguel Araos

15 June 2021	Independiente de Cauquenes (3)	1–3	Fernández Vial (2)	Talca
15:00	Julio 70'	Report	Harbottle 57'; Sáez 80'; Sepúlveda 90+3'	Stadium: Fiscal; Attendance: 0 Referee: Reinerio Alvarado

15 June 2021	General Velásquez (3)	0–1	Rangers (2)	San Vicente
15:00		Report	I. González 80'	Stadium: Municipal Augusto Rodríguez; Attendance: 0 Referee: Patricio Blanca

15 June 2021	Deportes Colina (3)	1–0	Santiago Morning (2)	Colina
15:00	Toloza 11'	Report		Stadium: Municipal Manuel Rojas del Río; Attendance: 0 Referee: Felipe Jara

15 June 2021	Deportes Concepción (3)	1–0	Universidad de Concepción (2)	Concepción
18:00	Arrué 54'	Report		Stadium: Ester Roa; Attendance: 0 Referee: Claudio Aranda

15 June 2021	Deportes Iquique (2)	2–2 (4–3 p)	San Marcos de Arica (2)	Iquique
20:00	Oroz 15'; Espinosa 52'	Report	Muñoz 35'; Viotti 89'	Stadium: Tierra de Campeones; Attendance: 0 Referee: Franco Arrué
	Penalties
	Díaz (penalty missed); Salinas (penalty missed); Fernández (penalty scored); Ramos (penalty scored); Hidalgo (penalty scored); Miño (penalty scored)		(penalty missed) Gárate; (penalty scored) Monroy; (penalty scored) Viotti; (penalty missed) Iñíguez; (penalty scored) Hernández; (penalty missed) Donadell

16 June 2021	San Antonio Unido (3)	2–0	Unión San Felipe (2)	Quillota
15:00	Pinilla 46', 52'	Report		Stadium: Municipal Lucio Fariña Fernández; Attendance: 0 Referee: Cristian Galaz

16 June 2021	Lautaro de Buin (3)	0–3; Awarded (4–2 p)	Magallanes (2)	La Pintana, Santiago
15:00	Bustos 6'	Report	Jopia 22'	Stadium: Municipal de La Pintana; Attendance: 0 Referee: Claudio Cevasco
	Penalties
	Cuéllar (penalty scored); Ríos (penalty scored); Penroz (penalty scored); Lagos (penalty missed); Cepeda (penalty scored)		(penalty missed) Leal; (penalty scored) Vásquez; (penalty scored) Arguinarena; (penalty missed) Jopia
Note: The match originally ended with Lautaro de Buin winning on penalty kicks after a 1–1 draw over 90 minutes, however they were disqualified from the competition for fielding an ineligible player. Due to this, Magallanes advanced to the second round.

== Bracket ==
Second round
3	Barnechea	0	2	2
20	Palestino	2	5	7
12	Santiago Wanderers	0	1	1
29	Deportes Concepción	1	1	2
10	Deportes Colina	1	0	1
15	Deportes La Serena	2	5	7
22	Colo-Colo	–	–	–
Bye	–	–	–
9	Magallanes	4	0	4
14	Audax Italiano	0	3	3
7	Deportes Puerto Montt	0	3	3
27	Unión Española	2	2	4
18	Deportes Temuco	0	2	2
25	Unión La Calera	0	0	0
28	San Antonio Unido	0	2	2
30	Huachipato	0	3	3
6	Everton	3	1	4
23	Deportes Santa Cruz	0	1	1
11	Deportes Iquique	1	4	5 (8)
16	Universidad Católica (p)	1	4	5 (9)
8	Deportes Melipilla	0	0	0
19	Ñublense	1	0	1
21	O'Higgins (p)	1	1	2 (7)
31	Cobreloa	0	2	2 (6)
2	Universidad de Chile	1	3	4
5	San Luis	0	1	1
13	Fernández Vial (p)	0	2	2 (4)
26	Cobresal	0	2	2 (2)
1	Curicó Unido	1	1	2 (2)
17	Rangers (p)	1	1	2 (3)
4	Deportes Antofagasta	0	0	0
24	Coquimbo Unido	0	1	1

Round of 16
20	Palestino	4	4	8
29	Deportes Concepción	0	0	0
15	Deportes La Serena	1	0	1
22	Colo-Colo	3	4	7
9	Magallanes	0	0	0
27	Unión Española	1	1	2
18	Deportes Temuco	2	0	2
30	Huachipato	2	2	4
6	Everton	0	2	2
16	Universidad Católica	0	0	0
19	Ñublense (p)	1	2	3 (3)
21	O'Higgins	1	2	3 (2)
2	Universidad de Chile	1	1	2 (4)
13	Fernández Vial (p)	1	1	2 (5)
17	Rangers	0	0	0
24	Coquimbo Unido	1	0	1

Quarter-finals
20	Palestino	2	1	3
22	Colo-Colo	3	1	4
27	Unión Española	1	1	2
30	Huachipato	1	0	1
6	Everton	1	1	2
19	Ñublense	0	1	1
13	Fernández Vial	0	0	0
24	Coquimbo Unido	0	3	3

Semi-finals
22	Colo-Colo	4	3	7
27	Unión Española	0	2	2
6	Everton	2	0	2
24	Coquimbo Unido	1	0	1

Final
22	Colo-Colo	2
6	Everton	0

== Second round ==
The draw for the second round and subsequent phases was held on 15 June 2021. 16 Primera División teams (titleholders Colo-Colo received a bye to the round of 16) entered the competition at this stage and were drawn against the 14 first round winners. The team with the highest seed assigned in the draw hosted the second leg. The first legs were played from 21 to 30 June 2021, while the second legs were played from 25 June to 5 July 2021.

Team 1	Agg.	Team 2	1st leg	2nd leg
Universidad de Chile (1)	4–1	San Luis (2)	1–0	3–1
Deportes Iquique (2)	5–5 (8–9 p)	Universidad Católica (1)	1–1	4–4
Barnechea (2)	2–7	Palestino (1)	0–2	2–5
Magallanes (2)	4–3	Audax Italiano (1)	4–0	0–3
Curicó Unido (1)	2–2 (2–3 p)	Rangers (2)	1–1	1–1
Deportes Melipilla (1)	0–1	Ñublense (1)	0–1	0–0
Colo-Colo (1)	Bye	N/A	N/A	N/A
Deportes Temuco (2)	2–0	Unión La Calera (1)	0–0	2–0
Fernández Vial (2)	2–2 (4–2 p)	Cobresal (1)	0–0	2–2
Everton (1)	4–1	Deportes Santa Cruz (2)	3–0	1–1
Santiago Wanderers (1)	1–2	Deportes Concepción (3)	0–1	1–1
Deportes Puerto Montt (2)	3–4	Unión Española (1)	0–2	3–2
Deportes Antofagasta (1)	0–1	Coquimbo Unido (2)	0–0	0–1
O'Higgins (1)	2–2 (7–6 p)	Cobreloa (2)	1–0	1–2
Deportes Colina (3)	1–7	Deportes La Serena (1)	1–2	0–5
San Antonio Unido (3)	2–3	Huachipato (1)	0–0	2–3

=== First leg ===
21 June 2021	Curicó Unido	1–1	Rangers	Curicó
20:30	Salvador 13' (o.g.)	Report	Monreal 11'	Stadium: La Granja; Attendance: 0 Referee: Francisco Gilabert

22 June 2021	Barnechea	0–2	Palestino	San Francisco de Mostazal
12:30		Report	Sánchez Sotelo 50'; Jiménez 90+5'	Stadium: Municipal; Attendance: 0 Referee: Benjamín Saravia

22 June 2021	Deportes Antofagasta	0–0	Coquimbo Unido	Antofagasta
12:30		Report		Stadium: Regional Calvo y Bascuñán; Attendance: 0 Referee: Eduardo Gamboa

22 June 2021	Fernández Vial	0–0	Cobresal	Concepción
18:00		Report		Stadium: Ester Roa; Attendance: 0 Referee: Rafael Troncoso

22 June 2021	Deportes Iquique	1–1	Universidad Católica	Iquique
20:00	Fernández 79'	Report	Salomón 45+3'	Stadium: Tierra de Campeones; Attendance: 0 Referee: Felipe González

23 June 2021	Deportes Temuco	0–0	Unión La Calera	Temuco
12:30		Report		Stadium: Municipal Germán Becker; Attendance: 0 Referee: Manuel Vergara

23 June 2021	Deportes Puerto Montt	0–2	Unión Española	Puerto Montt
12:30		Report	T. Galdames 21'; Conelli 80'	Stadium: Regional de Chinquihue; Attendance: 0 Referee: Ángelo Hermosilla

23 June 2021	Deportes Melipilla	0–1	Ñublense	La Pintana, Santiago
15:30		Report	Guerra 87'	Stadium: Municipal de La Pintana; Attendance: 0 Referee: Héctor Jona

23 June 2021	San Antonio Unido	0–0	Huachipato	Quillota
15:30		Report		Stadium: Municipal Lucio Fariña Fernández; Attendance: 0 Referee: Rodrigo Carvajal

23 June 2021	Deportes Colina	1–2	Deportes La Serena	Colina
15:30	Riquelme 8'	Report	Rizzoli 67'; Monardes 70'	Stadium: Municipal Manuel Rojas del Río; Attendance: 0 Referee: Gustavo Ahumada

23 June 2021	O'Higgins	1–0	Cobreloa	Rancagua
17:30	Larrondo 20'	Report		Stadium: El Teniente; Attendance: 0 Referee: César Deischler

23 June 2021	Everton	3–0	Deportes Santa Cruz	Viña del Mar
20:00	Díaz 25'; Medina 37'; Echeverría 52'	Report		Stadium: Sausalito; Attendance: 0 Referee: Nicolás Gamboa

24 June 2021	Santiago Wanderers	0–1	Deportes Concepción	Valparaíso
11:00		Report	Muñoz 57'	Stadium: Elías Figueroa Brander; Attendance: 0 Referee: José Cabero

24 June 2021	Universidad de Chile	1–0	San Luis	Rancagua
17:30	Cortés 87'	Report		Stadium: El Teniente; Attendance: 0 Referee: Cristian Droguett

30 June 2021	Magallanes	4–0	Audax Italiano	San Bernardo, Santiago
12:00	Zapata 42', 83'; Orellana 56', 64'	Report		Stadium: Municipal Luis Navarro Avilés; Attendance: 0 Referee: Matías Quila

=== Second leg ===
25 June 2021	Rangers	1–1 (2–2 agg.) (3–2 p)	Curicó Unido	Talca
20:30	Martínez 61'	Report	Benegas 57'	Stadium: Fiscal; Attendance: 0 Referee: José Cabero
	Penalties
	Zúñiga (penalty scored); Ábalos (penalty scored); Monreal (penalty scored); Velásquez (penalty missed)		(penalty scored) Villagrán; (penalty missed) Opazo; (penalty scored) Rojas; (penalty missed) Barroilhet; (penalty missed) Harding

26 June 2021	Cobresal	2–2 (2–2 agg.) (2–4 p)	Fernández Vial	El Salvador
11:00	Mesías 10'; Pol 71'	Report	Carrasco 31'; Sepúlveda 56'	Stadium: El Cobre; Attendance: 0 Referee: Gustavo Ahumada
	Penalties
	R. González (penalty missed); Donoso (penalty scored); Mesías (penalty missed); Ayala (penalty scored)		(penalty scored) Espinoza; (penalty scored) Pinilla; (penalty scored) Harbottle; (penalty scored) Loyola

26 June 2021	Coquimbo Unido	1–0 (1–0 agg.)	Deportes Antofagasta	Coquimbo
12:00	Garate 81' (pen.)	Report		Stadium: Municipal Francisco Sánchez Rumoroso; Attendance: 0 Referee: Felipe González

26 June 2021	Huachipato	3–2 (3–2 agg.)	San Antonio Unido	Talcahuano
15:00	Palmezano 2', 24'; Huanca 11'	Report	Alvarado 47'; Venegas 53'	Stadium: CAP-Acero; Attendance: 0 Referee: Manuel Vergara

26 June 2021	Deportes Santa Cruz	1–1 (1–4 agg.)	Everton	Santa Cruz
18:00	Fuenzalida 90+4'	Report	Cerato 84'	Stadium: Municipal Joaquín Muñoz García; Attendance: 0 Referee: Juan Lara

26 June 2021	Unión La Calera	0–2 (0–2 agg.)	Deportes Temuco	La Calera
18:00		Report	R. Castro 33'; F. Castro 54'	Stadium: Municipal Nicolás Chahuán Nazar; Attendance: 0 Referee: Ángelo Hermosilla

26 June 2021	Universidad Católica	4–4 (5–5 agg.) (9–8 p)	Deportes Iquique	Las Condes, Santiago
20:30	Parot 23'; Buonanotte 58'; Zampedri 64'; Valencia 68'	Report	Ramos 2'; Espinosa 5'; Oroz 47', 79'	Stadium: San Carlos de Apoquindo; Attendance: 0 Referee: Francisco Gilabert
	Penalties
	Buonanotte (penalty scored); Aued (penalty scored); Valencia (penalty scored); Asta-Buruaga (penalty scored); Zampedri (penalty scored); Silva (penalty scored); Fuenzalida (penalty scored); Cornejo (penalty missed); Huerta (penalty scored); Salomón (penalty scored)		(penalty scored) Santander; (penalty scored) Salinas; (penalty scored) Fernández; (penalty scored) Oroz; (penalty scored) Espinosa; (penalty scored) Mellado; (penalty scored) Hidalgo; (penalty missed) Contreras; (penalty scored) Soria; (penalty missed) Coronel

27 June 2021	Unión Española	2–3 (4–3 agg.)	Deportes Puerto Montt	Independencia, Santiago
11:00	Villagra 7', 73'	Report	Melivilú 11'; Avello 75'; Troncoso 81'	Stadium: Santa Laura; Attendance: 0 Referee: Eduardo Gamboa

27 June 2021	Cobreloa	2–1 (2–2 agg.) (6–7 p)	O'Higgins	Calama
12:00	Olivera 58'; Parra 83'	Report	Belmar 10'	Stadium: Zorros del Desierto; Attendance: 0 Referee: Nicolás Gamboa
	Penalties
	Barrientos (penalty scored); Soto (penalty scored); Cortés (penalty scored); Brito (penalty missed); Ramírez (penalty scored); Ríos (penalty scored); Olivera (penalty scored); Parra (penalty missed)		(penalty scored) Batalla; (penalty scored) Castro; (penalty scored) Acevedo; (penalty scored) Sepúlveda; (penalty missed) Fernández; (penalty scored) Torrealba; (penalty scored) Seymour; (penalty scored) Cahais

27 June 2021	Palestino	5–2 (7–2 agg.)	Barnechea	La Cisterna, Santiago
15:00	Jiménez 10', 55'; Dávila 17'; Cortés 59'; Sánchez Sotelo 66'	Report	Flores 12'; Blázquez 42'	Stadium: Municipal de La Cisterna; Attendance: 0 Referee: Rodrigo Carvajal

27 June 2021	Ñublense	0–0 (1–0 agg.)	Deportes Melipilla	Chillán
15:00		Report		Stadium: Municipal Nelson Oyarzún Arenas; Attendance: 0 Referee: Christian Rojas

27 June 2021	Deportes La Serena	5–0 (7–1 agg.)	Deportes Colina	La Serena
15:00	Benítez 32', 49'; Munder 43'; Pérez 75'; Zuleta 89'	Report		Stadium: La Portada; Attendance: 0 Referee: Héctor Jona

27 June 2021	Deportes Concepción	1–1 (2–1 agg.)	Santiago Wanderers	Concepción
18:00	Baeza 49'	Report	Soto 9'	Stadium: Ester Roa; Attendance: 0 Referee: Benjamín Saravia

27 June 2021	San Luis	1–3 (1–4 agg.)	Universidad de Chile	Quillota
20:30	González 48'	Report	Sandoval 17'; Larrivey 45', 90+4'	Stadium: Municipal Lucio Fariña Fernández; Attendance: 0 Referee: César Deischler

5 July 2021	Audax Italiano	3–0 (3–4 agg.)	Magallanes	Rancagua
15:00	Holgado 31' (pen.); Fuentes 44'; Montecinos 61'	Report		Stadium: El Teniente; Attendance: 0 Referee: Benjamín Saravia

== Round of 16 ==
Team 1	Agg.	Team 2	1st leg	2nd leg
Universidad de Chile (1)	2–2 (4–5 p)	Fernández Vial (2)	1–1	1–1
Everton (1)	2–0	Universidad Católica (1)	0–0	2–0
Palestino (1)	8–0	Deportes Concepción (3)	4–0	4–0
Magallanes (2)	0–2	Unión Española (1)	0–1	0–1
Rangers (2)	0–1	Coquimbo Unido (2)	0–1	0–0
Ñublense (1)	3–3 (3–2 p)	O'Higgins (1)	1–1	2–2
Deportes La Serena (1)	1–7	Colo-Colo (1)	1–3	0–4
Deportes Temuco (2)	2–4	Huachipato (1)	2–2	0–2

=== First leg ===
30 June 2021	Palestino	4–0	Deportes Concepción	La Cisterna, Santiago
15:00	Barticciotto 31'; Jiménez 41', 61'; Zedán 90+3'	Report		Stadium: Municipal de La Cisterna; Attendance: 0 Referee: Ángelo Hermosilla

30 June 2021	Rangers	0–1	Coquimbo Unido	Talca
18:00		Report	Pereyra 26' (pen.)	Stadium: Fiscal; Attendance: 0 Referee: Benjamín Saravia

30 June 2021	Everton	0–0	Universidad Católica	Viña del Mar
20:30		Report		Stadium: Sausalito; Attendance: 0 Referee: José Cabero

1 July 2021	Deportes Temuco	2–2	Huachipato	Temuco
15:00	R. Castro 7'; F. Castro 36'	Report	Gazzolo 45', 90+5'	Stadium: Municipal Germán Becker; Attendance: 0 Referee: César Deischler

1 July 2021	Deportes La Serena	1–3	Colo-Colo	La Serena
15:30	Fernández 17'	Report	Morales 4'; Costa 57'; Solari 59'	Stadium: La Portada; Attendance: 0 Referee: Eduardo Gamboa

1 July 2021	Ñublense	1–1	O'Higgins	Chillán
18:00	Guerra 80'	Report	Castro 33'	Stadium: Municipal Nelson Oyarzún Arenas; Attendance: 0 Referee: Fernando Véjar

1 July 2021	Universidad de Chile	1–1	Fernández Vial	Rancagua
20:30	Larrivey 41'	Report	Solano 15'	Stadium: El Teniente; Attendance: 0 Referee: Francisco Gilabert

9 July 2021	Magallanes	0–1	Unión Española	San Bernardo, Santiago
12:00		Report	Yañez 67'	Stadium: Municipal Luis Navarro Avilés; Attendance: 0 Referee: Rodrigo Carvajal

=== Second leg ===
3 July 2021	Deportes Concepción	0–4 (0–8 agg.)	Palestino	Concepción
15:00		Report	Sánchez Sotelo 18'; Barticciotto 42'; Dávila 81'; Zedán 90+1'	Stadium: Ester Roa; Attendance: 0 Referee: Manuel Vergara

3 July 2021	Universidad Católica	0–2 (0–2 agg.)	Everton	Las Condes, Santiago
15:00		Report	Cerato 5'; Echeverría 32'	Stadium: San Carlos de Apoquindo; Attendance: 0 Referee: Eduardo Gamboa

4 July 2021	Coquimbo Unido	0–0 (1–0 agg.)	Rangers	Coquimbo
12:30		Report		Stadium: Municipal Francisco Sánchez Rumoroso; Attendance: 0 Referee: César Deischler

4 July 2021	Fernández Vial	1–1 (2–2 agg.) (5–4 p)	Universidad de Chile	Concepción
15:00	Espinoza 16'	Report	Larrivey 21' (pen.)	Stadium: Ester Roa; Attendance: 0 Referee: Rodrigo Carvajal
	Penalties
	Loyola (penalty missed); Díaz (penalty scored); Harbottle (penalty scored); Riffo (penalty scored); Silva (penalty scored); Sepúlveda (penalty scored)		(penalty scored) Larrivey; (penalty missed) Sandoval; (penalty scored) Arias; (penalty scored) Galani; (penalty scored) Espinoza; (penalty missed) Casanova

4 July 2021	O'Higgins	2–2 (3–3 agg.) (2–3 p)	Ñublense	Rancagua
17:30	Larrondo 37' (pen.); Torrealba 44'	Report	Vargas 34' (pen.); Mateos 67'	Stadium: El Teniente; Attendance: 0 Referee: Juan Lara
	Penalties
	Batalla (penalty missed); Castro (penalty missed); Acevedo (penalty scored); Torrealba (penalty scored); M. González (penalty missed)		(penalty scored) Vargas; (penalty scored) Mateos; (penalty missed) Pinto; (penalty scored) Guerra; (penalty missed) Valenzuela

4 July 2021	Colo-Colo	4–0 (7–1 agg.)	Deportes La Serena	Macul, Santiago
20:00	Morales 31', 55'; Fasson 66' (o.g.); Costa 90+3'	Report		Stadium: Monumental David Arellano; Attendance: 0 Referee: Felipe González

5 July 2021	Huachipato	2–0 (4–2 agg.)	Deportes Temuco	Talcahuano
15:00	Torres 16'; Rodríguez 90+3'	Report		Stadium: CAP-Acero; Attendance: 0 Referee: Christian Rojas

12 July 2021	Unión Española	1–0 (2–0 agg.)	Magallanes	Independencia, Santiago
15:00	Palacios 8'	Report		Stadium: Santa Laura; Attendance: 0 Referee: Benjamín Saravia

== Quarter-finals ==
Team 1	Agg.	Team 2	1st leg	2nd leg
Fernández Vial (2)	0–3	Coquimbo Unido (2)	0–0	0–3
Everton (1)	2–1	Ñublense (1)	1–0	1–1
Palestino (1)	3–4	Colo-Colo (1)	2–3	1–1
Unión Española (1)	2–1	Huachipato (1)	1–1	1–0

=== First leg ===
8 July 2021	Palestino	2–3	Colo-Colo	La Cisterna, Santiago
15:00	Barticciotto 78'; Suárez 88'	Report	Rodríguez 8'; Benítez 52' (o.g.); Bolados 83'	Stadium: Municipal de La Cisterna; Attendance: 0 Referee: José Cabero

8 July 2021	Everton	1–0	Ñublense	Viña del Mar
20:00	Díaz 45'	Report		Stadium: Sausalito; Attendance: 0 Referee: Ángelo Hermosilla

10 July 2021	Fernández Vial	0–0	Coquimbo Unido	Concepción
16:30		Report		Stadium: Ester Roa; Attendance: 0 Referee: Francisco Gilabert

4 August 2021	Unión Española	1–1	Huachipato	Independencia, Santiago
20:00	Conelli 54'	Report	Torres 43'	Stadium: Santa Laura; Attendance: 0 Referee: Francisco Gilabert

=== Second leg ===
11 July 2021	Ñublense	1–1 (1–2 agg.)	Everton	Chillán
18:00	Vargas 34'	Report	Bravo 51'	Stadium: Municipal Nelson Oyarzún Arenas; Attendance: 0 Referee: Manuel Vergara

11 July 2021	Colo-Colo	1–1 (4–3 agg.)	Palestino	Macul, Santiago
20:30	Rodríguez 60'	Report	Alvarado 18'	Stadium: Monumental David Arellano; Attendance: 0 Referee: Christian Rojas

5 August 2021	Coquimbo Unido	3–0 (3–0 agg.)	Fernández Vial	Coquimbo
20:00	Pontigo 16'; Pereyra 33'; Cortés 79'	Report		Stadium: Municipal Francisco Sánchez Rumoroso; Attendance: 0 Referee: Christian Rojas

11 August 2021	Huachipato	0–1 (1–2 agg.)	Unión Española	Talcahuano
20:00		Report	T. Galdames 56'	Stadium: CAP-Acero; Attendance: 0 Referee: Roberto Tobar

== Semi-finals ==
Team 1	Agg.	Team 2	1st leg	2nd leg
Everton (1)	2–1	Coquimbo Unido (2)	2–1	0–0
Colo-Colo (1)	7–2	Unión Española (1)	4–0	3–2

=== First leg ===
18 August 2021	Colo-Colo	4–0	Unión Española	Macul, Santiago
17:00	Morales 45+3' (pen.), 55'; Costa 73'; Amor 90+1'	Report		Stadium: Monumental David Arellano; Attendance: 4,488; Referee: José Cabero

18 August 2021	Everton	2–1	Coquimbo Unido	Viña del Mar
19:30	Echeverría 60'; Waterman 90+3' (pen.)	Report	Felipe 83'	Stadium: Sausalito; Attendance: 1,500; Referee: Héctor Jona

=== Second leg ===
1 September 2021	Coquimbo Unido	0–0 (1–2 agg.)	Everton	Coquimbo
16:30		Report		Stadium: Municipal Francisco Sánchez Rumoroso; Attendance: 3,582; Referee: Christian Rojas

1 September 2021	Unión Española	2–3 (2–7 agg.)	Colo-Colo	Independencia, Santiago
19:00	Palacios 38' (pen.); Norambuena 90+5'	Report	Solari 43', 45+1'; Bolados 65'	Stadium: Santa Laura; Attendance: 794; Referee: Héctor Jona

== Final ==
On 19 August 2021, ANFP confirmed that the 2021 Copa Chile final would be played on 4 September 2021 in Talca.

4 September 2021
16:30

Colo-Colo (1)	2–0	Everton (1)
Solari 55'; Cruz 66'	Report

Estadio Fiscal, Talca
Attendance: 3,071
Referee: Piero Maza

== Top scorers ==
Rank	Name	Club	Goals
1	(Chile) Iván Morales	Colo-Colo	5
2	(Argentina) Pablo Solari	Colo-Colo	4
2	(Argentina) Juan Sánchez Sotelo	Palestino	4
2	(Chile) Luis Jiménez	Palestino	4
2	(Argentina) Joaquín Larrivey	Universidad de Chile	4

Source: Campeonato Chileno

== See also ==
- 2021 Chilean Primera División
- 2021 Primera B de Chile
