= 2016 Copa Chile =

Copa Chile MTS

Tournament details
- Country: Chile
- Teams: 31

Final positions
- Champions: Colo-Colo
- Runners-up: Everton

Tournament statistics
- Matches played: 59
- Goals scored: 155 (2.63 per match)
- Top goal scorer: Esteban Paredes (8 goals)

The 2016 Copa Chile, (officially known as Copa Chile MTS 2016 because of its sponsorship), was the 37th edition of the Copa Chile, the country's national cup tournament. The competition started on 8 July 2016 with the First Round and ended on 14 December 2016 with the Final. Colo-Colo were the winners after beating Everton 4–0 in the final, and qualified for the 2017 Copa Libertadores and the 2017 Supercopa de Chile. As the runners-up, Everton qualified for the 2017 Copa Sudamericana.

== Format ==
The Copa Chile MTS 2016 was based on a system of direct elimination, similar to the Copa del Rey. In the first round match the 15 teams of Primera B faced against the 16 of the Premier Division (with the exception of Universidad de Chile, defending champions, who entered the competition at the round of 16).

== Prizes ==
The champion of this edition, earned the right to compete in the 2017 Copa Libertadores as Chile 3 (qualifying for the first round of the continental tournament). Besides, it earned the right to play the Supercopa de Chile 2017, against the best 2016-17 Primera Division champion.

== Schedule ==
Round	Date
First Round	July 8, 2016; July 20, 2016
Round of 16	September 15, 2016; November 3, 2016
Quarterfinals	October 18, 2016; November 14, 2016
Semifinals	November 23, 2016; November 30, 2016
Final	December 14, 2016

== First round ==
The first legs were played on 8–13 July, and the second legs were played on 15–20 July 2016.

Team 1	Agg.	Team 2	1st leg	2nd leg
Deportes La Serena	4–3	Santiago Wanderers	3–1	1–2
Ñublense	1–2	Colo-Colo	0–0	1–2
Deportes Copiapó	4–3	Cobresal	3–0 (Note: ANFP awarded Deportes Copiapó a 3–0 win as a result of Cobresal fielding the ineligible player Federico Martorell, after Cobresal had defeated Deportes Copiapó 1–0. Federico Martorell had a 1-match pending ban while playing for San Luis at the 2015 Copa Chile and did not meet eligibility rules.)	1–3
Unión La Calera	3–4	San Luis	2–2	1–2
Coquimbo Unido	0–7	Palestino	0–6	0–1
Rangers	2–6	O'Higgins	1–3	1–3
Deportes Puerto Montt	1–5	Deportes Temuco	0–2	1–3
Deportes Iquique	4–2	San Marcos de Arica	2–0	2–2
Magallanes	2–2 (3-4p)	Unión Española	1–2	1–0
Iberia	2–6	Huachipato	1–5	1–1
Cobreloa	2–1	Deportes Antofagasta	1–0	1–1
Curicó Unido	1–2	Audax Italiano	1–1	0–1
Santiago Morning	2–3	Universidad Católica	2–0	0–3
Unión San Felipe	1–6	Everton	1–3	0–3
Deportes Valdivia	w/o (Note: The tie was awarded to Universidad de Concepción after Deportes Valdivia failed to have a suitable venue to play its home match.)	Universidad de Concepción	Not played	Not played

== Round of 16 ==
The draw for the Round of 16 (and ongoing phases) was held on 22 August 2016. In this round, Universidad de Chile entered the competition as defending champions.

The first legs were played on 15–21 September, and the second legs were played on 21 September–8 October 2016.

The tie between Palestino and Everton was delayed due to the participation of Palestino at the 2016 Copa Sudamericana.

Team 1	Agg.	Team 2	1st leg	2nd leg
Palestino	1–2	Everton	0–1	1–1
Unión Española	6–1	O'Higgins	4–0	2–1
Universidad de Concepción	0–2	San Luis	0–1	0–1
Audax Italiano	5–3	Deportes Copiapó	3–1	2–2
Huachipato	3–4	Colo-Colo	2–1	1–3
Cobreloa	3–0	Deportes La Serena	3–0	0–0
Universidad Católica	4–2	Deportes Temuco	2–1	2–1
Deportes Iquique	3–3 (6–7p)	Universidad de Chile	1–1	2–2

=== First leg ===
15 September 2016	Unión Española	4–0	O'Higgins	Independencia, Santiago
18:30	Salom 24', 79'; Churín 31'; Hernández 90+3'	Report		Stadium: Estadio Santa Laura-Universidad SEK; Referee: Francisco Gilabert

15 September 2016	Cobreloa	3–0	Deportes La Serena	Calama
20:00	Monreal 13', 26'; Jara 90'	Report		Stadium: Estadio Zorros del Desierto; Referee: Christian Rojas

15 September 2016	Audax Italiano	3–1	Deportes Copiapó	La Florida, Santiago
20:30	Campos Toro 12'; Vallejos 56'; Carrasco 76'	Report	Guarino 50'	Stadium: Estadio Bicentenario de La Florida; Referee: Rafael Troncoso

16 September 2016	Huachipato	2–1	Colo-Colo	Talcahuano
15:00	Sepúlveda 16'; Povea 39'	Report	Paredes 82'	Stadium: Estadio CAP; Referee: Patricio Polic

21 September 2016	Deportes Iquique	1–1	Universidad de Chile	Iquique
16:00	Caroca 79'	Report	G. Fernández 36'	Stadium: Estadio Cavancha; Referee: Felipe González

21 September 2016	Universidad de Concepción	0–1	San Luis	Concepción
19:30		Report	G. Martínez 43'	Stadium: Estadio Ester Roa Rebolledo; Referee: Franco Arrué

21 September 2016	Universidad Católica	2–1	Deportes Temuco	Las Condes, Santiago
21:00	Castillo 12'; Fuenzalida 80'	Report	C. Martínez 68'	Stadium: Estadio San Carlos de Apoquindo; Referee: Roberto Tobar

7 October 2016	Palestino	0–1	Everton	La Cisterna, Santiago
16:00		Report	Zúñiga 42'	Stadium: Estadio Municipal de La Cisterna; Referee: Carlos Ulloa

=== Second leg ===
21 September 2016	O'Higgins	1–2 (1–6 agg.)	Unión Española	Rancagua
18:30	Márquez 86'	Report	Churín 21'; Sierra 84'	Stadium: Estadio El Teniente; Referee: Ángelo Hermosilla

27 September 2016	Colo-Colo	3–1 (4–3 agg.)	Huachipato	Macul, Santiago
20:00	Figueroa 41'; Morales 52'; Paredes 71'	Report	Sagal 79'	Stadium: Estadio Monumental; Referee: César Deischler

28 September 2016	Deportes Copiapó	2–2 (3–5 agg.)	Audax Italiano	Caldera
16:00	Guarino 77', 80'	Report	Santos 19'; Carrasco 90+4'	Stadium: Estadio La Caldera; Referee: Christian Rojas

28 September 2016	Deportes Temuco	1–2 (2–4 agg.)	Universidad Católica	Temuco
17:30	Piña 67'	Report	Castillo 59'; Jaime 78'	Stadium: Estadio Germán Becker; Referee: Eduardo Gamboa

28 September 2016	Deportes La Serena	0–0 (0–3 agg.)	Cobreloa	La Serena
19:00		Report		Stadium: Estadio La Portada; Referee: Piero Maza

28 September 2016	Universidad de Chile	2–2 (3–3 agg.) (7–6 p)	Deportes Iquique	Ñuñoa, Santiago
20:00	G. Fernández 54'; Carmona 61'	Report	Ramos 72'; Dávila 82'	Stadium: Estadio Nacional; Referee: Cristián Andaur
	Penalties
	Mat. Rodríguez (penalty missed); G. Fernández (penalty scored); Beausejour (penalty scored); Monzón (penalty scored); Carmona (penalty missed); S. Martínez (penalty scored); Leiva (penalty scored); Vilches (penalty scored); Herrera (penalty scored)		(penalty scored) Bustamante; (penalty scored) Riquero; (penalty missed) Lopes; (penalty scored) Ramos; (penalty missed) Dávila; (penalty scored) Charles; (penalty scored) Caroca; (penalty scored) Rebolledo; (penalty missed) Reynero

8 October 2016	San Luis	1–0 (2–0 agg.)	Universidad de Concepción	Quillota
19:00	Abán 52'	Report		Stadium: Estadio Lucio Fariña; Referee: Ángelo Hermosilla

3 November 2016	Everton	1–1 (2–1 agg.)	Palestino	Viña del Mar
20:30	Peñailillo 47'	Report	Valencia 30'	Stadium: Estadio Sausalito; Referee: Julio Bascuñán

== Quarterfinals ==
The first legs were played on 18–20 October, and the second legs were played on 24–26 October 2016.

The tie between Unión Española and Everton was delayed due to the participation of Palestino at the 2016 Copa Sudamericana.

Team 1	Agg.	Team 2	1st leg	2nd leg
Unión Española	1–2	Everton	1–2	0–0
San Luis	5–5 (3–4p)	Audax Italiano	2–4	3–1
Cobreloa	2–5	Colo-Colo	1–2	1–3
Universidad Católica	5–3	Universidad de Chile	2–0	3–3

=== First leg ===
18 October 2016	San Luis	2–4	Audax Italiano	Quillota
20:00	G. Martínez 4'; Silva 35'	Report	Riquelme 38'; Santos 54', 55'; Campos Toro 82'	Stadium: Estadio Lucio Fariña; Referee: Jorge Osorio

19 October 2016	Universidad Católica	2–0	Universidad de Chile	Las Condes, Santiago
20:30	Castillo 20'; Buonanotte 57'	Report		Stadium: Estadio San Carlos de Apoquindo; Referee: Patricio Polic

20 October 2016	Cobreloa	1–2	Colo-Colo	Calama
20:00	F. Cornejo 67'	Report	Rivero 50'; Mar. Rodríguez 87'	Stadium: Estadio Zorros del Desierto; Referee: Julio Bascuñán

10 November 2016	Unión Española	1–2	Everton	Independencia, Santiago
20:30	Salom 29'	Report	Cerato 9'; Ragusa 70'	Stadium: Estadio Santa Laura-Universidad SEK; Referee: Cristián Andaur

=== Second leg ===
24 October 2016	Universidad de Chile	3–3 (3–5 agg.)	Universidad Católica	Ñuñoa, Santiago
20:30	Mora 39'; G. Fernández 58'; Mat. Rodríguez 67'	Report	Castillo 61'; Lanaro 71'; Fuenzalida 74'	Stadium: Estadio Nacional; Referee: Roberto Tobar

25 October 2016	Audax Italiano	1–3 (5–5 agg.) (4–3 p)	San Luis	La Florida, Santiago
20:00	Vallejos 38'	Report	Lara 35'; Silva 58'; Fiorina 90+5'	Stadium: Estadio Bicentenario de La Florida; Referee: Eduardo Gamboa
	Penalties
	Carrasco (penalty missed); Vásquez (penalty scored); Drocco (penalty missed); J. Cornejo (penalty scored); Riquelme (penalty scored); Bosso (penalty scored)		(penalty scored) Césped; (penalty scored) Sirino; (penalty scored) Fiorina; (penalty missed) Grondona; (penalty missed) Silva; (penalty missed) Cano

26 October 2016	Colo-Colo	3–1 (5–2 agg.)	Cobreloa	Macul, Santiago
19:30	Paredes 5'; R. Fernández 34'; Rivero 75'	Report	Servín 25'	Stadium: Estadio Monumental; Referee: Carlos Ulloa

14 November 2016	Everton	0–0 (2–1 agg.)	Unión Española	Viña del Mar
20:30		Report		Stadium: Estadio Sausalito; Referee: Eduardo Gamboa

== Semifinals ==
The first legs will be played on 23 November, and the second legs will be played on 30 November 2016.

Team 1	Agg.	Team 2	1st leg	2nd leg
Everton	4–2	Audax Italiano	3–2	1–0
Universidad Católica	0–3	Colo-Colo	0–1	0–2

=== First leg ===
23 November 2016	Universidad Católica	0–1	Colo-Colo	Las Condes, Santiago
20:00		Report	Baeza 71'	Stadium: Estadio San Carlos de Apoquindo; Attendance: 9,877; Referee: Roberto Tobar

23 November 2016	Everton	3–2	Audax Italiano	Viña del Mar
20:30	Suárez 7'; B. Rodríguez 35', 75'	Report	Faúndez 83'; Melivilú 90+4'	Stadium: Estadio Sausalito; Attendance: 7,529; Referee: Ángelo Hermosilla

=== Second leg ===
30 November 2016	Colo-Colo	2–0 (3–0 agg.)	Universidad Católica	Macul, Santiago
20:00	Mar. Rodríguez 36'; Paredes 57'	Report		Stadium: Estadio Monumental; Attendance: 38,980; Referee: Jorge Osorio

30 November 2016	Audax Italiano	0–1 (2–4 agg.)	Everton	La Florida, Santiago
20:30		Report	B. Rodríguez 71'	Stadium: Estadio Bicentenario de La Florida; Attendance: 5,122; Referee: Patricio Polic

== Final ==
14 December 2016 Final	Colo-Colo	4–0	Everton	Estadio Nacional, Santiago
20:00	Rivero 26'; Paredes 36', 38'; R. Fernández 71'	Report		Attendance: 33,419; Referee: Julio Bascuñán

Copa Chile MTS
2016 Champion
Colo-Colo
Eleventh Title

== Top goalscorers ==
Pos	Player	Club	Goals
1	(Chile) Esteban Paredes	Colo-Colo	8
2	(Uruguay) Braian Rodríguez	Everton	5
3	(Brazil) Sergio Santos	Audax Italiano	4
3	(Palestine) Carlos Salom	Unión Española	4
3	(Chile) Nicolás Castillo	Universidad Católica	4
6	(Chile) José Pablo Monreal	Cobreloa	3
6	(Chile) Patricio Jerez	Cobresal	3
6	(Uruguay) Javier Guarino	Deportes Copiapó	3
6	(Paraguay) Cris Martínez	Deportes Temuco	3
6	(Argentina) Maximiliano Cerato	Everton	3
6	(Argentina) Leandro Benegas	Palestino	3
6	(Chile) Leonardo Valencia	Palestino	3
6	(Chile) Gerson Martínez	San Luis de Quillota	3
6	(Argentina) Gastón Fernández	Universidad de Chile	3
