= Piero Campos =

Chilean footballer (born 1992)

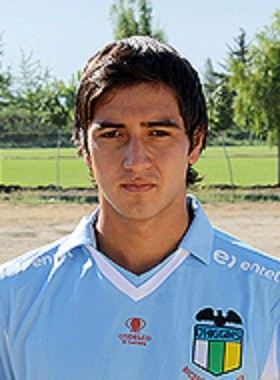
- Piero Campos

Personal information
- Full name: Piero Matías Campos Moreno
- Date of birth: 28 January 1992 (age 34)
- Place of birth: Rancagua, Chile
- Height: 1.80 m (5 ft 11 in)
- Position: Striker

Senior career*
Years	Team	Apps	(Gls)
2009–2013	O'Higgins		
2013	→ U. Temuco (loan)		
2014–2019	Deportes Temuco		
2016–2017	→ Ñublense (loan)		
2017	→ Iberia (loan)		
- * Club domestic league appearances and goals as of 22 March 2020

Piero Matías Campos Moreno (born 28 January 1992) is a Chilean footballer.

His last club was Deportes Temuco.

== Honours ==
=== Player ===
Deportes Temuco

- Primera B (1): 2015–16
