= Gonzalo Abán =

Argentine footballer (born 1987)

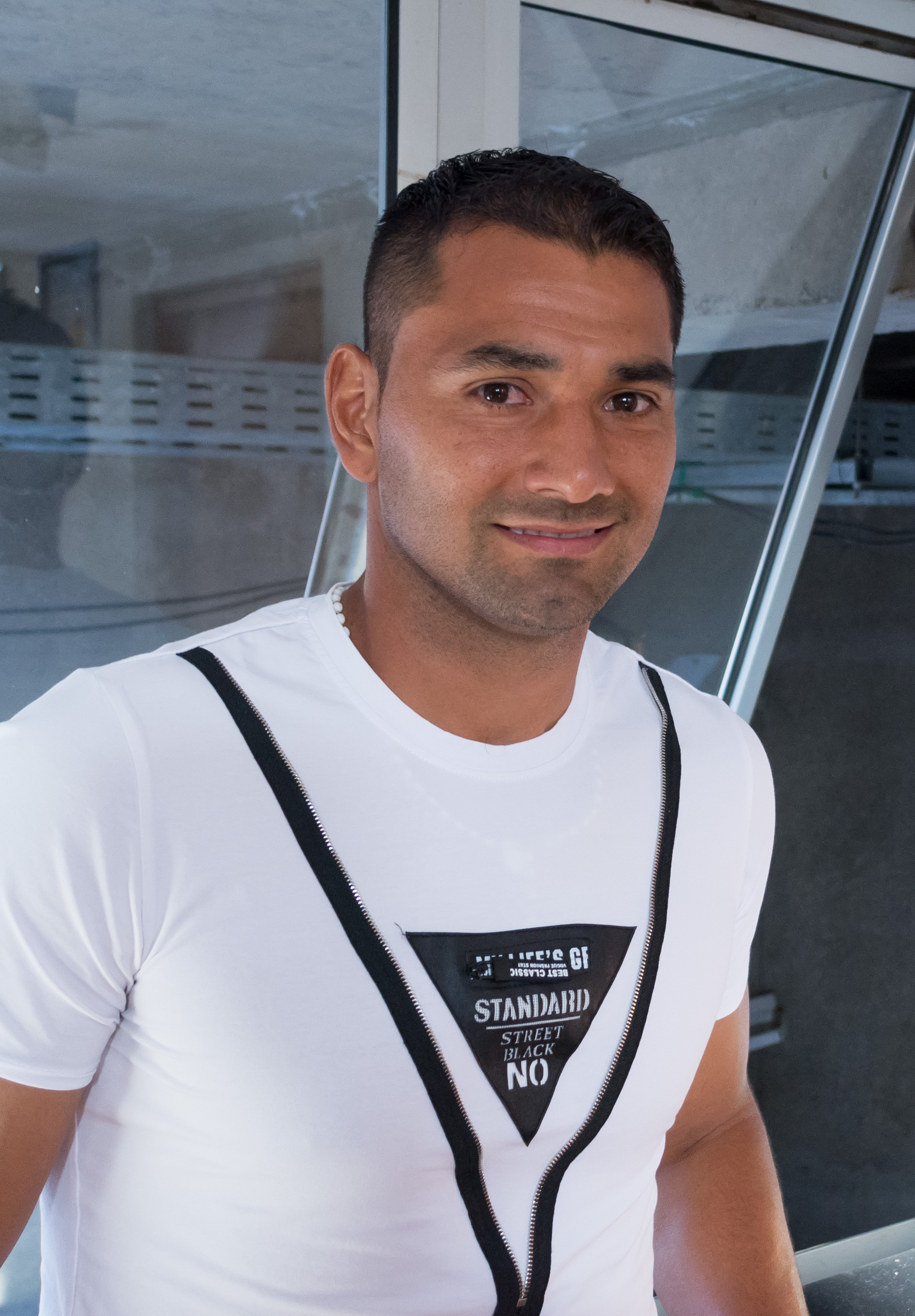
- Abán in 2020

Personal information
- Full name: Gonzalo Daniel Abán
- Date of birth: 11 June 1987 (age 39)
- Place of birth: Rincón, Argentina
- Height: 1.79 m (5 ft 10 in)
- Position: Forward

Team information
- Current team: Andino SC

Youth career
- River Plate

Senior career*
Years	Team	Apps	(Gls)
2005–2006	River Plate	13	(1)
2006–2009	Argentinos Juniors	39	(3)
2009–2011	Ferro Carril Oeste	31	(7)
2011–2013	Racing de Olavarría	27	(10)
2013–2017	San Luis	64	(9)
2015–2016	→ Unión Española (loan)	24	(3)
2017–2018	Unión La Calera	40	(8)
2019	Cobreloa	23	(6)
2020	San Luis	7	(2)
2021	Deportes Limache	12	(7)
2022	San Antonio Unido	16	(3)
2022–	Andino SC	–	(–)

International career
2006–2007	Argentina U20	7	(1)
- * Club domestic league appearances and goals as of 5 January 2025

Gonzalo Daniel Abán (born 11 June 1987) is an Argentine football striker who plays for Andino SC.

== Club career ==
Abán came through the youth system of River Plate but, shortly after making his first team debut, he was transferred on a long-term loan to Argentinos Juniors.

His last club in Chile was San Antonio Unido in 2022.

Following San Antonio Unido, Abán returned to Argentina and joined Andino SC on 13 October 2022.

== International career ==
Abán played for the Argentina Under-20 team at the 2007 South American Youth Championship in Paraguay, where he scored one goal.

== Personal life ==
His son of the same name, Gonzalo Jr., is a footballer from the Deportes Limache youth ranks.

== Honours ==
San Luis

- Primera B (1): 2013 Apertura (Note: no promotion to Primera División)

Unión La Calera

- Primera B (1): 2017 Transición
