= Sebastian Ramírez =

Sebastian Ramírez may refer to:

- Sebastián Ramírez de Fuenleal (1490-1547), Spanish bishop
- Sebastián Ramírez (footballer, born 1992), Uruguayan footballer
- Sebastian Ramírez (footballer, born 2000), Argentine footballer
