= Cris Martínez =

Paraguayan footballer (born 1993)

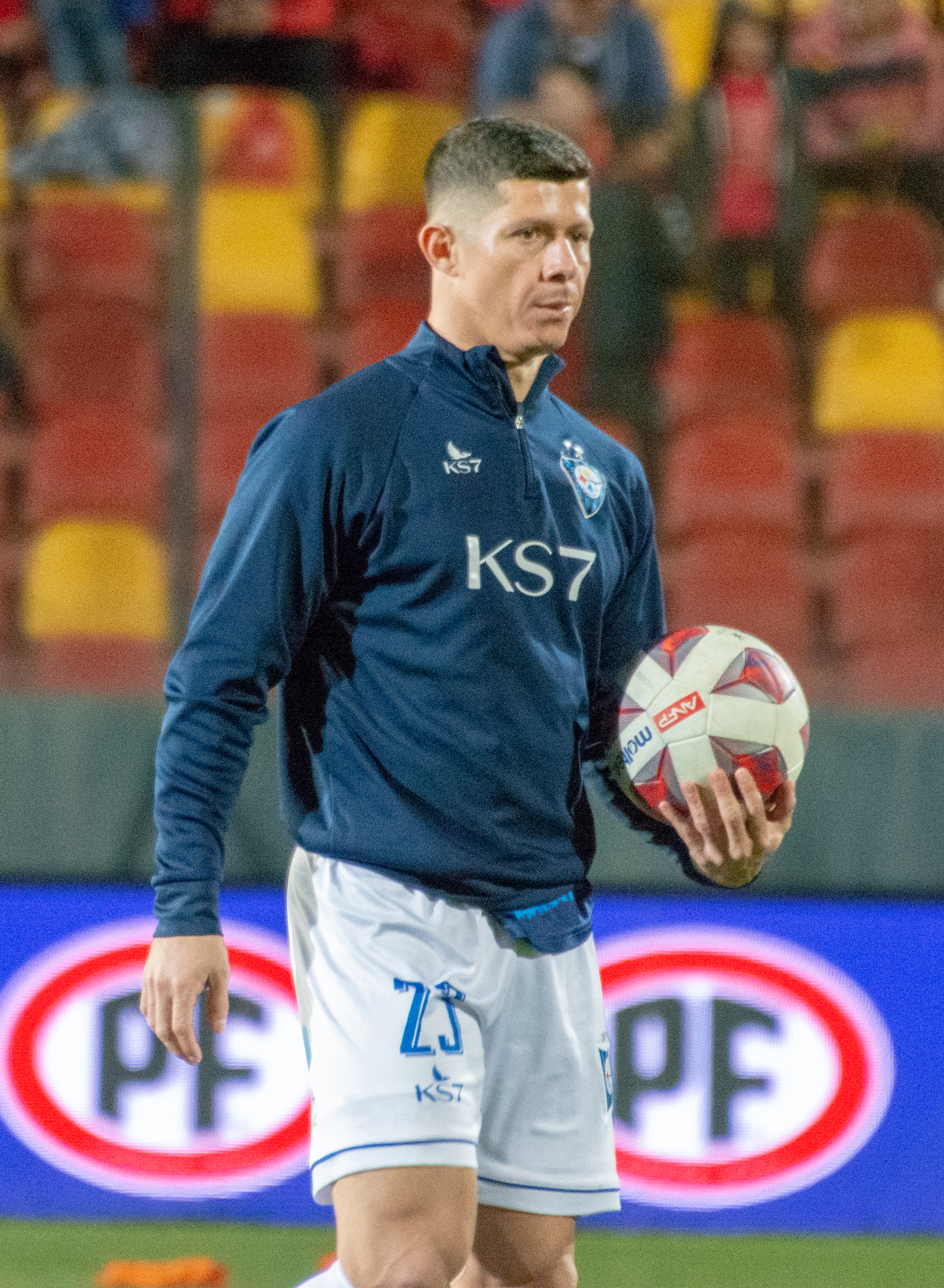
- Martínez with Huachipato in 2023

Personal information
- Full name: Cris Robert Martínez Escobar
- Date of birth: 24 April 1993 (age 33)
- Place of birth: Carlos A. López, Asunción, Paraguay
- Height: 1.70 m (5 ft 7 in)
- Position: Forward

Team information
- Current team: Huachipato
- Number: 23

Youth career
- Nacional

Senior career*
Years	Team	Apps	(Gls)
2009–2011	Nacional		
2012–2015	San Luis	54	(20)
2012	→ Lidköpings IF (loan)		
2014	→ Universitario (loan)	20	(3)
2015–2018	Deportes Temuco	70	(30)
2018	→ Santos Laguna (loan)	6	(0)
2019–	Huachipato	120	(25)
- * Club domestic league appearances and goals as of 13 August 2023

Cris Robert Martínez Escobar (born April 24, 1993, in Paraguay) is a Paraguayan-born, naturalized Chilean footballer who plays as a forward for Huachipato.

== Personal life ==
Martínez obtained Chilean nationality through residency in January 2021.

== Honours ==
Nacional

- Paraguayan Primera División: 2009 Clausura, 2011 Apertura

San Luis de Quillota

- Primera B de Chile: 2013 Apertura

Deportes Temuco

- Primera B de Chile: 2015–16

Santos Laguna

- Liga MX: 2018 Clausura

Huachipato

- Chilean Primera División: 2023
- Copa Chile: 2025
