= Rubén Cepeda =

Chilean footballer (born 1994)

Personal information
- Full name: Rubén Juan Cepeda Vergara
- Date of birth: 17 June 1994 (age 32)
- Place of birth: Quilpué, Chile
- Height: 1.68 m (5 ft 6 in)
- Position: Midfielder

Youth career
- Universidad de Chile

Senior career*
Years	Team	Apps	(Gls)
2013–2014	Universidad de Chile	0	(0)
2015–2021	Deportes Temuco	67	(0)
2021	Lautaro de Buin	15	(0)
2025	Deportes Rengo	20	(1)
- * Club domestic league appearances and goals as of 26 May 2026

Rubén Juan Cepeda Vergara (born 17 June 1994) is a Chilean footballer who plays as a midfielder.

== Honours ==
Deportes Temuco

- Primera B: 2015–16
