= Diego Fernández (footballer) =

Chilean footballer (born 1998)

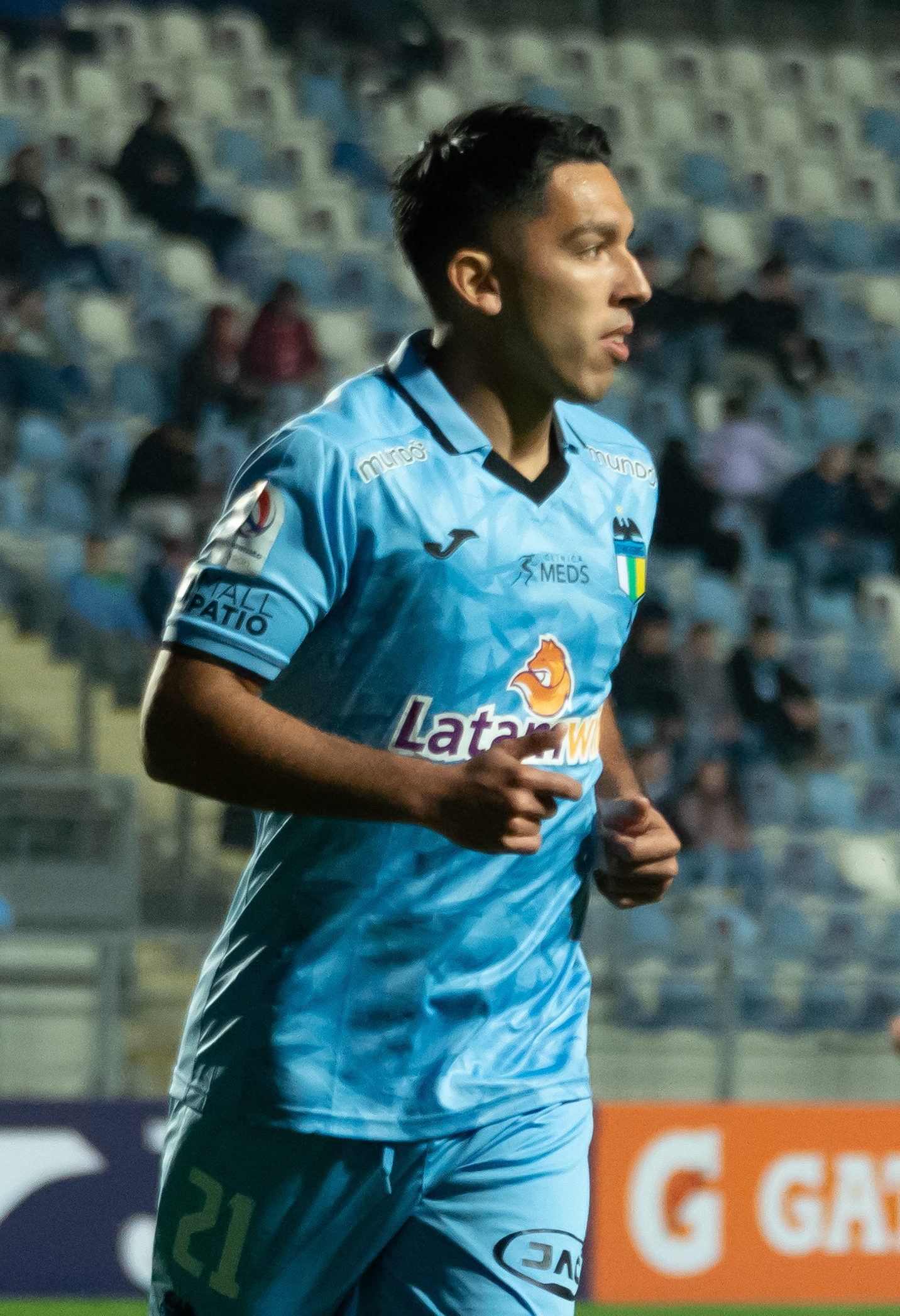
- Fernández with O'Higgins in 2023

Personal information
- Full name: Diego Nicolás Fernández Castro
- Date of birth: 8 March 1998 (age 28)
- Place of birth: Loncoche, Chile
- Position: Midfielder

Team information
- Current team: Magallanes
- Number: 8

Youth career
- Deportes Iquique

Senior career*
Years	Team	Apps	(Gls)
2014–2025	Deportes Iquique	140	(8)
2022–2023	→ O'Higgins (loan)	45	(1)
2026–	Magallanes	0	(0)

International career
2014	Chile U17	2	(0)
2019	Chile U22	0	(0)
- * Club domestic league appearances and goals as of 3 January 2026

Diego Nicolás Fernández Castro (born 8 March 1998) is a Chilean footballer who plays as a midfielder for Magallanes.

== Club career ==
In 2022 and 2023, Fernández played for O'Higgins.

In January 2026, Fernández joined Magallanes from Deportes Iquique.

== International career ==
Fernández represented Chile at under-17 level in the 2014 South American Games. He also was a member of the Chile U22 squad in the 2019 Toulon Tournament.
