= Javier Guarino =

Uruguayan footballer (born 1986)

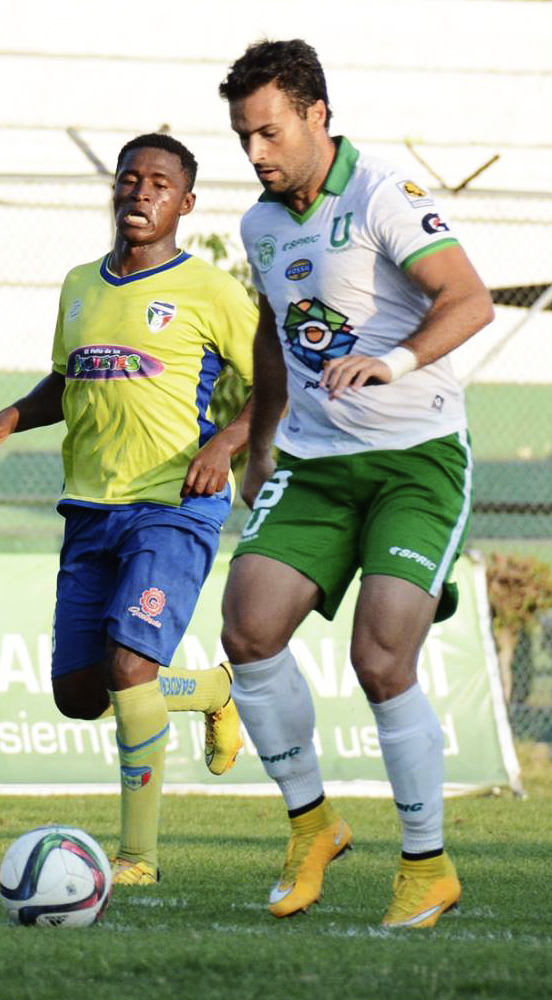
- Guarino in 2015

Personal information
- Full name: Luis Javier María Guarino Moscatelli
- Date of birth: 16 April 1986 (age 40)
- Place of birth: Salto, Uruguay
- Height: 1.82 m (6 ft 0 in)
- Position: Striker

Senior career*
Years	Team	Apps	(Gls)
2005–2010	Defensor Sporting	4	(0)
2007–2008	→ Plaza Colonia (loan)	41	(6)
2008	→ Rocha (loan)	13	(8)
2008–2009	→ Zwolle (loan)	24	(5)
2010	Lokomotiv Plovdiv	11	(1)
2010–2011	Plaza Colonia	11	(1)
2011	ESPOLI	41	(10)
2012	Bella Vista	14	(4)
2012–2013	Real Esppor	34	(14)
2013	Caracas	11	(3)
2014	Tacuarembó	5	(2)
2015	Xelajú MC	18	(9)
2015	LDU Portoviejo	21	(8)
2016–2017	Deportes Copiapó	39	(16)
2017	Cobreloa	5	(0)
2018	Deportes Puerto Montt	12	(1)
2019	Ferro Carril	–	(–)
- * Club domestic league appearances and goals

Luis Javier María Guarino Moscatelli (born April 16, 1986), known as Javier Guarino, is a Uruguayan former professional footballer who played as a striker.

== Career ==
Guarino was born in Salto. He started his professional career playing with Defensor Sporting in 2006.

During 2011, he played in Espoli of Ecuador scoring 10 goals in 41 matches.

In January 2012, he was transferred to Uruguayan Primera División side C.A. Bella Vista.

On 12 July 2012, Guarino signed a new deal with Caracas FC of Venezuela. He made his Venezuelan Primera División debut on 11 August 2012, scoring a goal against Estudiantes de Mérida.

In 2019, he joined Uruguayan side Ferro Carril F.C. in the Copa Nacional de Clubes, but he injured at the end of the year.
