= Hernán Lopes =

Argentine-Paraguayan footballer

Hernán Lópes
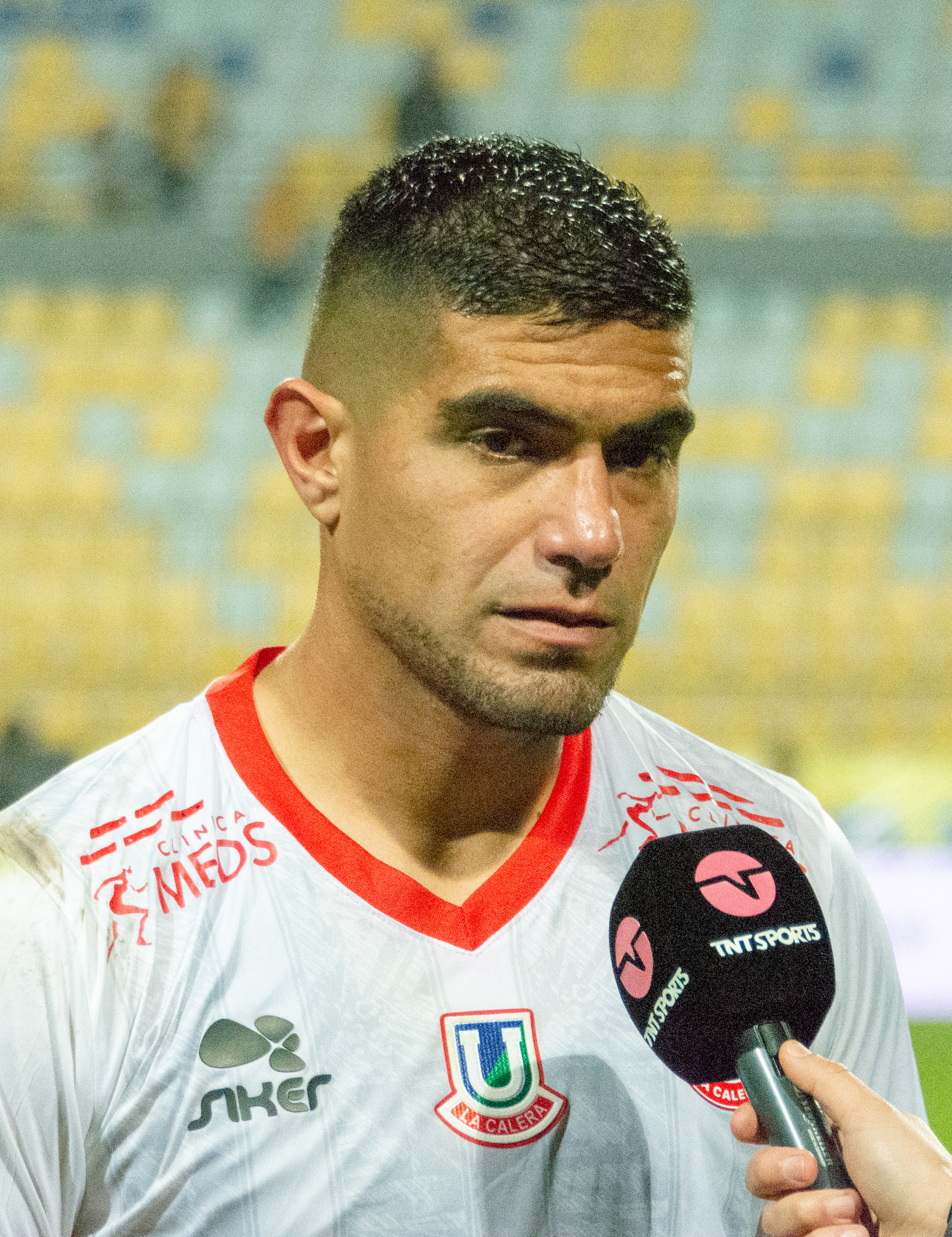
- Lópes with Unión La Calera in 2023

Personal information
- Full name: Hernán Ezequiel Lópes
- Date of birth: 28 March 1991 (age 35)
- Place of birth: Lomas de Zamora, Argentina
- Height: 1.80 m (5 ft 11 in)
- Position: Defender

Team information
- Current team: Águilas Doradas
- Number: 29

Youth career
- Lanús

Senior career*
Years	Team	Apps	(Gls)
2010–2014	Lanús	1	(0)
2011–2013	→ Atlanta (loan)	43	(0)
2013–2014	→ Flandria (loan)	33	(1)
2015	Estudiantes de Caseros	41	(5)
2016–2018	Deportes Iquique	74	(1)
2019–2020	Guaraní	21	(0)
2021–2022	San Martín Tucumán	61	(2)
2023	Unión La Calera	21	(1)
2024	Colón	33	(0)
2025	San Martín SJ	4	(0)
2025–	Águilas Doradas	17	(1)
- * Club domestic league appearances and goals as of 12 December 2025

Hernán Ezequiel Lópes (born March 28, 1991, in Lomas de Zamora (Buenos Aires), Argentina) is an Argentine-Paraguayan footballer who plays as a defender for Categoría Primera A club Águilas Doradas.

== Career ==
- (Argentina) Lanús 2010–2011
- (Argentina) Atlanta 2011–2013
- (Argentina) Flandria 2013–2014
- (Argentina) Estudiantes de Buenos Aires 2015
- (Chile) Deportes Iquique 2016–2018
- (Paraguay) Guaraní 2019–2020

In 2023, Lópes played for Chilean Primera División club Unión La Calera. The next year, he returned to Argentina and signed with Colón in the Primera Nacional.

== Personal life ==
Lópes naturalized Paraguayan by descent in 2019.
