= Francisco Ayala (footballer) =

Chilean footballer (born 1990)

Personal information
- Full name: Francisco Javier Ayala Díaz
- Date of birth: 30 January 1989 (age 37)
- Place of birth: Teno, Chile
- Height: 1.74 m (5 ft 9 in)
- Positions: Left-back; defensive midfielder

Youth career
- Curicó Unido

Senior career*
Years	Team	Apps	(Gls)
2008–2012	Curicó Unido	40	(2)
2012	→ Deportes Copiapó (loan)	14	(3)
2013–2015	Iberia	46	(3)
2015–2017	Unión San Felipe	37	(6)
2017	Curicó Unido	2	(0)
2018	Coquimbo Unido	27	(1)
2019	Deportes Melipilla	10	(1)
2020	Deportes Puerto Montt	23	(0)
2021	Cobresal	25	(0)
2022	Santiago Morning	19	(0)
2023–2024	Deportes Santa Cruz	40	(1)
Total		283	(17)
- * Club domestic league appearances and goals

Francisco Javier Ayala Díaz (born 13 January 1990) is a Chilean former footballer who played as a left-back.

He officially retired in 2025.

== Honors ==
Curicó Unido

- Primera B de Chile (1): 2008

Iberia

- Segunda División (1): 2013–T

Coquimbo Unido

- Primera B de Chile (1): 2018
