= Jonathan Salvador =

Chilean footballer (born 1991)

Personal information
- Full name: Jonathan Alejandro Salvador Lara
- Date of birth: 9 September 1991 (age 35)
- Place of birth: Concepción, Chile
- Height: 1.84 m (6 ft 0 in)
- Position: Goalkeeper

Youth career
- Deportes Concepción

Senior career*
Years	Team	Apps	(Gls)
2010–2016	Deportes Concepción	39	(0)
2011–	→ Fernández Vial (loan)	13	(0)
2014–2015	→ Unión Española (loan)	1	(0)
2016–2019	Unión San Felipe	44	(0)
2017	→ Palestino (loan)	1	(0)
2020–2021	Rangers	12	(0)
2022	Iberia	17	(0)
2023	Santiago Morning	16	(0)
2024	Deportes Recoleta	6	(0)
Total		149	(0)
- * Club domestic league appearances and goals

Jonathan Alejandro Salvador Lara (born 9 September 1991) is a Chilean former footballer who played as a goalkeeper.

== Career ==
Salvador signed with Deportes Recoleta from Santiago Morning for the 2024 season.

Salvador officially retired in 2025.
