= Nicolás Zedán =

Association football player (born 2000)

Personal information
- Full name: Nicolás Alberto Zedán Abu-Ghosh
- Date of birth: 7 June 2000 (age 26)
- Place of birth: Santiago, Chile
- Height: 1.82 m (6 ft 0 in)
- Position: Forward

Team information
- Current team: San Marcos

Youth career
- Palestino

Senior career*
Years	Team	Apps	(Gls)
2018–2021	Palestino	10	(0)
2020–2021	→ San Luis (loan)	14	(1)
2022	Deportes Recoleta	5	(0)
2022–2023	Shabab Al-Khalil	–	(–)
2023	Iberia	10	(6)
2024	Santiago Morning	1	(0)
2024	Deportes Puerto Montt	13	(2)
2025	Al-Malaab El-Libby	2	(0)
2025	Brujas de Salamanca	12	(6)
2026–	San Marcos	0	(0)

International career
2018–2019	Chile U20		
2022–	Palestine	2	(0)
- * Club domestic league appearances and goals as of 15 January 2026

Nicolás Alberto Zedán Abu-Ghosh (born 7 June 2000) is a professional footballer who plays as a forward for San Marcos de Arica. Born in Chile, he initially represented Chile at under-20 level before representing the Palestine national team.

== Club career ==
Zedán is a product of Palestino. He made his professional debut on 12 May 2018, against Huachipato in the Chilean Primera División. Zedán was in the starting lineup but was replaced after 53 minutes. This game was his first and last game in that season. In the following season, he played only 15 minutes in total for the first team of Palestino. In 2020, Zedán moved to San Luis de Quillota on loan. On 11 February 2022, Zedán joined Chilean Segunda División club Deportes Recoleta.

In November 2022, Zedán moved to the Palestinian West Bank Premier League to join Shabab Al-Khalil. In the second half of 2023, he returned to Chile and joined Iberia.

In January 2024, Zedán joined Primera B de Chile side Santiago Morning. In June 2024, Zedán joined Segunda División Profesional de Chile side Deportes Puerto Montt. In the second half of the same year, he played for Deportes Puerto Montt.

In February 2025, Zedán joined Libyan Premier League club Al-Malaab El-Libby.

Back in Chile, Zedán joined Brujas de Salamanca in the second half of 2025. The next season, he switched to San Marcos de Arica.

== International career ==
In June 2018, Zedán was called up for the Chilean U20 national team.

In February 2019, he was called up for the Palestine national team squad to play the 2019 AFC Asian Cup. In 2022, he was called up for the 2023 AFC Asian Cup qualifiers in June 2022.
