= Felipe Pinilla =

Chilean footballer (born 1997)

Personal information
- Full name: Luis Felipe Pinilla Astudillo
- Date of birth: 24 September 1997 (age 29)
- Place of birth: La Ligua, Chile
- Height: 1.74 m (5 ft 9 in)
- Positions: Winger; forward

Team information
- Current team: La Higuera
- Number: 15

Youth career
- Universidad de Chile

Senior career*
Years	Team	Apps	(Gls)
2012–2018	Universidad de Chile	11	(2)
2016–2017	→ Iberia (loan)	12	(2)
2017	→ Santiago Wanderers (loan)	5	(0)
2019	Deportes Limache	1	(1)
2020–2021	Fernández Vial	29	(3)
2022–	La Higuera	–	(–)

International career
2015	Chile U20		
- * Club domestic league appearances and goals as of 13 June 2022

Luis Felipe Pinilla Astudillo (born 24 September 1997) is a Chilean professional footballer who plays as winger or forward for Club Deportivo La Higuera.

== Club career ==
In March 2019, Pinilla joined Deportes Limache. After being released from Fernández Vial, in 2022 he joined amateur Club Deportivo La Higuera from La Ligua, taking part in the 2022 Copa Chile.

== International career ==
Along with Chile U20, he won the L'Alcúdia Tournament in 2015.

== Career statistics ==
=== Club ===
Appearances and goals by club, season and competition
Club	Season	League		Continental		Cup		Total	
Club	Season	Apps	Goals	Apps	Goals	Apps	Goals	Apps	Goals
Universidad de Chile	2012	0	0	0	0	1	0	1	0
Universidad de Chile	2013	0	0	0	0	0	0	0	0
Universidad de Chile	2013–14	0	0	0	0	0	0	0	0
Universidad de Chile	2014–15	2	0	0	0	1	0	3	0
Universidad de Chile	2015–16	9	2	1	0	3	0	13	2
Universidad de Chile	Total	11	2	1	0	5	0	17	2
Iberia	2016–17	12	2	—		1	0	13	2
Santiago Wanderers	2017	5	0	—		5	0	10	0
Career total		29	4	1	0	11	0	41	4

== Honours ==
Universidad de Chile

- Copa Chile: 2012–13, 2015

Santiago Wanderers

- Copa Chile: 2017

Chile U20

- L'Alcúdia International Tournament: 2015
