= Claudio Jopia =

Chilean footballer (born 1991)

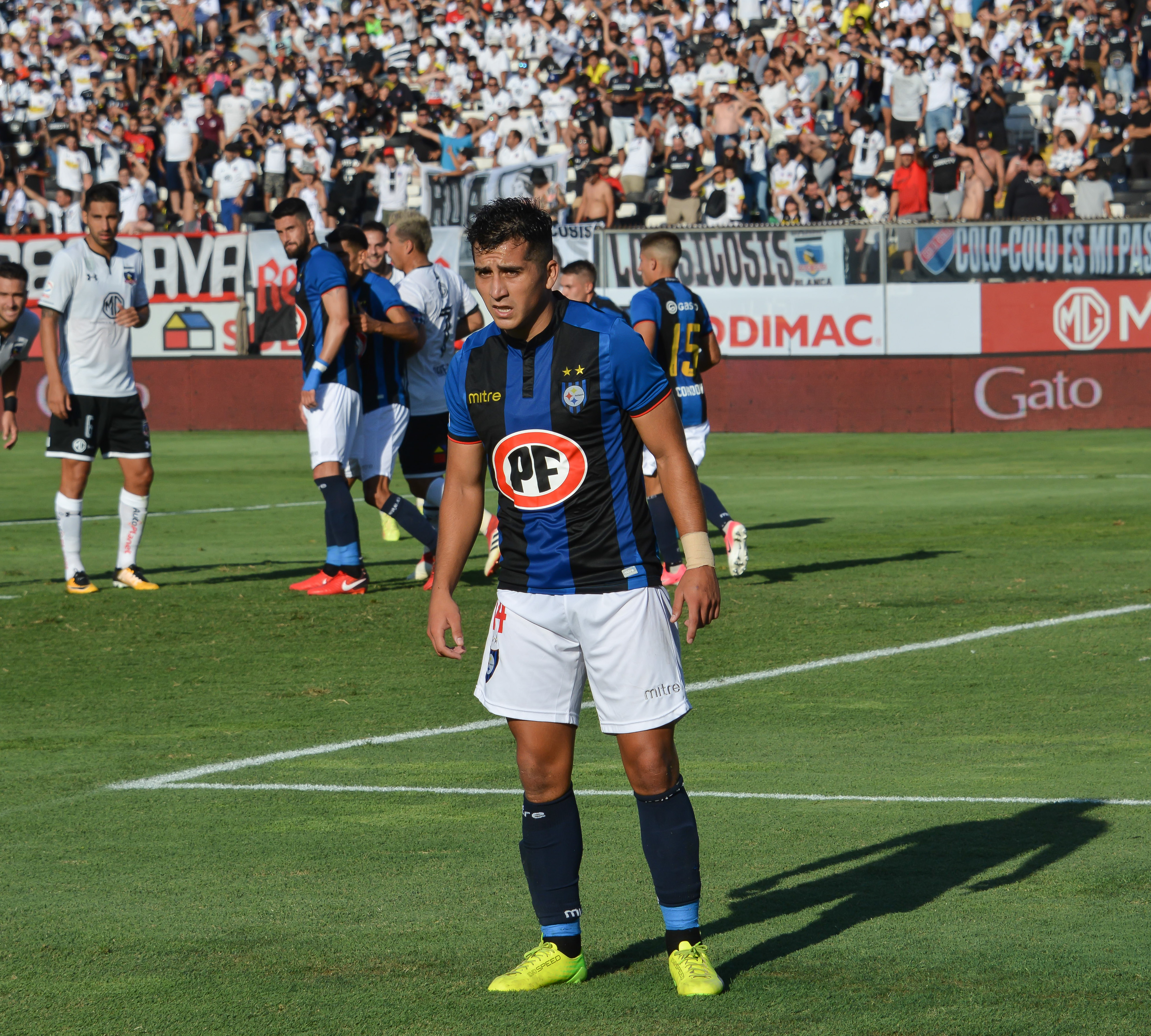
- Jopia with Huachipato in 2018

Personal information
- Full name: Claudio Andrés Jopia
- Date of birth: 11 January 1991 (age 35)
- Place of birth: La Serena, Chile
- Height: 1.72 m (5 ft 8 in)
- Position: Left back

Team information
- Current team: Lota Schwager
- Number: 21

Youth career
- 2004–2008: Deportes La Serena

Senior career*
Years	Team	Apps	(Gls)
2009–2013	Deportes La Serena	59	(0)
2013–2014	San Luis	15	(0)
2014–2016	San Marcos	53	(0)
2016–2019	Huachipato	39	(0)
2020	Cobreloa	19	(0)
2021–	Magallanes	18	(0)
2023	Rangers	14	(0)
2024	Deportes Rengo	22	(0)
2025	Concón National	20	(0)
2026–	Lota Schwager	0	(0)
- * Club domestic league appearances and goals as of 31 December 2025

Claudio Andrés Jopia (born 11 January 1991) is a Chilean footballer who plays for as a left-back for Lota Schwager.

== Career ==
He began his football career at Deportes La Serena, professional club of his natal city, in where was promoted to the first team in January 2009 for play the Apertura Tournament of that year. Jopia made his debut in a 4–2 home win over Cobreloa, and in the same season, he formed part of one historic teams of La Serena that earned the Clausura Tournament semi-finals. Three seasons later, after a successful 2011 season under the guidance of the coach Miguel Ponce, being used as left back. On 24 March 2012, he received his first red card in a match against Unión Española.

In March 2026, Jopia joined Lota Schwager in the Segunda División Profesional de Chile.
