= Matías Cano =

Argentine footballer

Personal information
- Full name: Matías Nicolás Cano
- Date of birth: 20 April 1986 (age 40)
- Place of birth: Adrogué, Argentina
- Height: 1.76 m (5 ft 9 in)
- Position: Goalkeeper

Team information
- Current team: Sportivo Bella Italia

Youth career
- Lanús
- Temperley

Senior career*
Years	Team	Apps	(Gls)
2005–2007	Temperley	0	(0)
2008–2010	Huracán de Comodoro	36	(0)
2010–2016	UAI Urquiza	166	(0)
2016–2017	San Luis	21	(0)
2017	Crucero del Norte	11	(0)
2018–2021	Coquimbo Unido	104	(0)
2022	Cobreloa	26	(0)
2023	Cuniburo	34	(0)
2024–2025	Real Pilar	62	(0)
2026–	Sportivo Bella Italia	0	(0)
- * Club domestic league appearances and goals as of 20 January 2026

Matías Nicolás Cano (born 20 April 1986) is an Argentine professional footballer who plays as a goalkeeper for Uruguayan club Sportivo Bella Italia.

== Career ==
Cano began his career with Temperley. In his homeland, he has played for Huracán de Comodoro, UAI Urquiza and Crucero del Norte.

In 2016, he moved to Chile and signed with San Luis de Quillota in the top division.

In 2018, he returned to Chile and joined Coquimbo Unido, winning two Primera B titles in 2018 and 2021 and taking part in the 2020 Copa Sudamericana. In 2022, he switched to Cobreloa.

In 2023, Cano moved to Ecuador and signed with Cuniburo in the second level.

In 2026, Cano moved to Uruguay and joined Sportivo Bella Italia in the third level.

== Political views ==
Cano has stated his closeness with the left wing, also taking part in the 2019–20 Chilean protests.

== Honours ==
UAI Urquiza

- Primera C Metropolitana: 2012–13

Coquimbo Unido

- Primera B: 2018, 2021
