= Mario Sandoval (footballer, born 1991) =

Chilean footballer (born 1991)

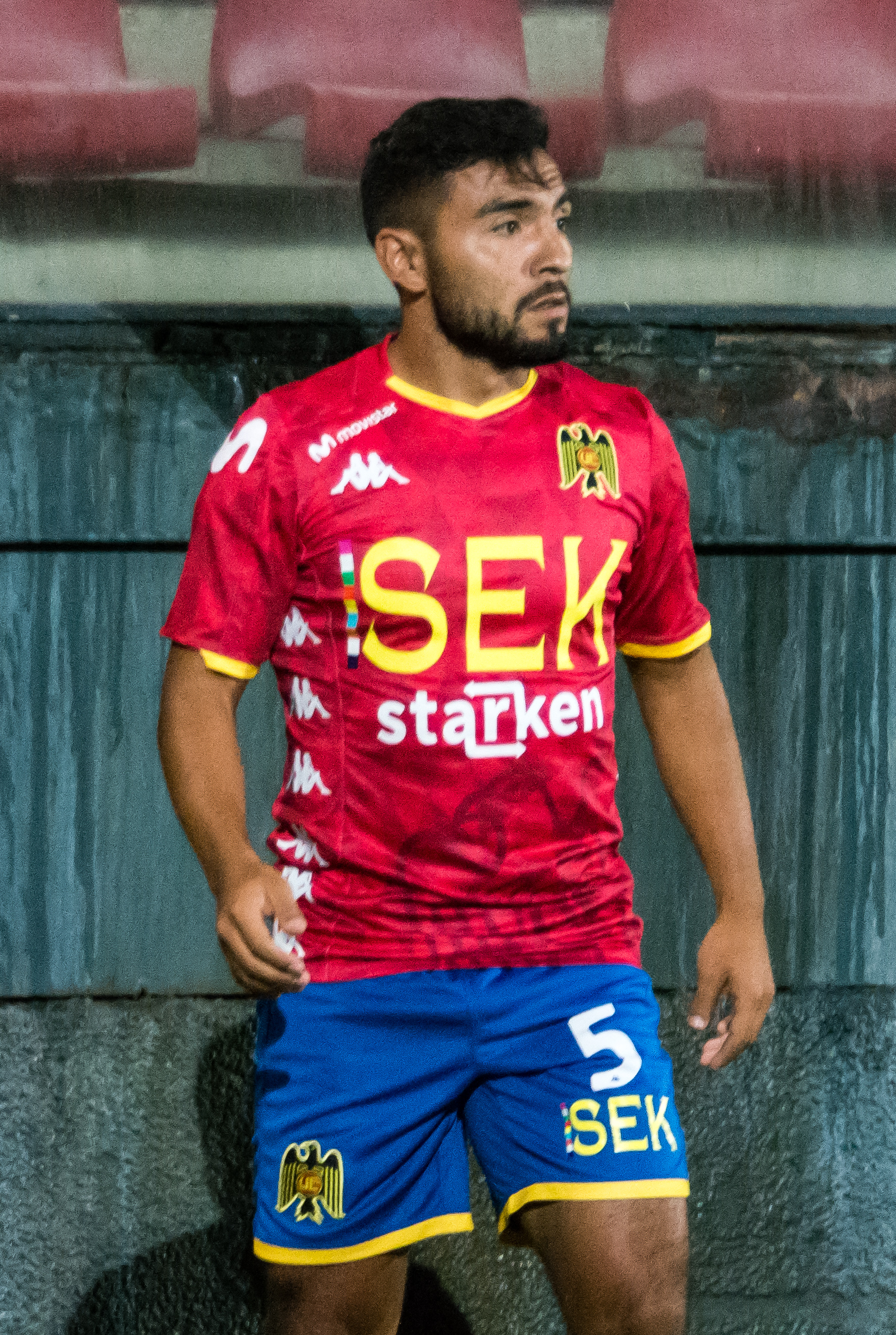
- Sandoval with Unión Española in 2020

Personal information
- Full name: Mario Aníbal Sandoval Toro
- Date of birth: 24 July 1991 (age 35)
- Place of birth: Santiago, Chile
- Height: 1.65 m (5 ft 5 in)
- Position: Midfielder

Team information
- Current team: Deportes Concepción

Youth career
- 2008–2010: Colo-Colo

Senior career*
Years	Team	Apps	(Gls)
2008–2014	Colo-Colo	0	(0)
2011–2012	→ Deportes Puerto Montt (loan)	59	(6)
2013	Colo-Colo B	17	(2)
2013	→ San Marcos (loan)	9	(0)
2014	Deportes Copiapó	1	(0)
2014–2015	Deportes Melipilla	21	(3)
2015–2016	Santiago Morning	18	(0)
2016–2017	San Antonio Unido	27	(7)
2017–2021	Deportes Melipilla	57	(11)
2019–2020	→ Unión Española (loan)	34	(4)
2021	→ Universidad de Chile (loan)	29	(2)
2022–2023	Curicó Unido	47	(4)
2024	Cobreloa	15	(0)
2025	Deportes Limache	13	(0)
2025–	Deportes Concepción	0	(0)
- * Club domestic league appearances and goals as of 30 July 2025

Mario Aníbal Sandoval Toro (born 24 July 1991) is a Chilean professional footballer who plays as a midfielder for Deportes Concepción.

== Career ==
Sandoval joined Cobreloa, a club promoted to the Chilean top division, for the 2024 season. After having a drunk driving crash in September 2024, he was fired.

In January 2025, Sandoval joined Deportes Limache. He switched to Deportes Concepción for the second half of the year.

== Personal life ==
He is the cousin of the Chile international footballer Charles Aránguiz. In addition, his aunt and mother of Charles, Mariana, is a football coach at amateur level in Puente Alto, Santiago.
