= 2013 Torneo Apertura (Primera B de Chile) =

Primera B de Chile
- Season: 2013–14 Primera B
- Champions: San Luis de Quillota

The 2013 Torneo Apertura was part of the 64th completed season of the Primera B de Chile.

San Luis de Quillota was tournament's champion.

== League table ==
Pos	Team	Pld	W	D	L	GF	GA	GD	Pts
1	San Luis de Quillota	19	11	5	3	34	12	+22	38
2	Santiago Morning	19	11	1	7	30	20	+10	34
3	Barnechea	19	9	6	4	27	20	+7	33
4	San Marcos de Arica	19	8	6	5	26	23	+3	30
5	Unión San Felipe	19	8	4	7	23	19	+4	28
6	Deportes Copiapó	19	8	4	7	23	22	+1	28
7	Naval	19	8	3	8	19	21	−2	27
8	Magallanes	19	7	5	7	24	29	−5	26
9	Curicó Unido	19	6	7	6	21	24	−3	25
10	Coquimbo Unido	19	6	5	8	25	31	−6	23
11	Deportes Temuco	19	5	7	7	24	29	−5	22
12	Deportes Concepción	19	6	4	9	12	19	−7	22
13	Deportes La Serena	19	2	9	8	22	30	−8	15
14	Lota Schwager	19	3	4	12	15	26	−11	13
