= Rodrigo González (footballer, born November 1995) =

Chilean footballer

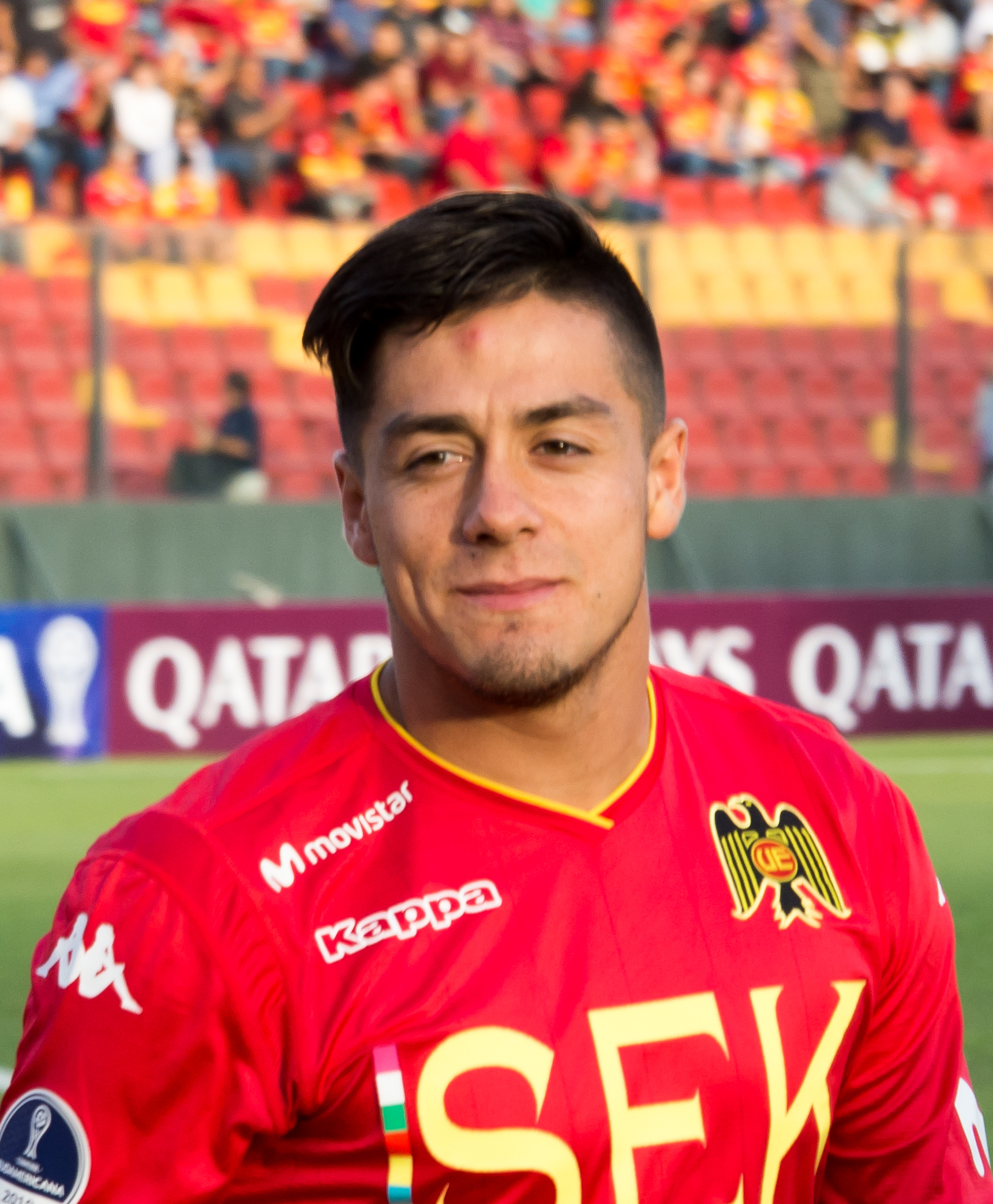
- González with Unión Española in 2019

Personal information
- Full name: Rodrigo Antonio González Catalán
- Date of birth: 30 November 1995 (age 30)
- Place of birth: San Vicente de Tagua Tagua, Chile
- Height: 1.70 m (5 ft 7 in)
- Positions: Right-back; right midfielder

Youth career
- Palestino
- Santiago Wanderers
- 2016: San Luis

Senior career*
Years	Team	Apps	(Gls)
2013	General Velásquez	–	(–)
2014	Colchagua	–	(–)
2015–2016	Chimbarongo FC	–	(–)
2016–2021	San Luis	84	(5)
2019	→ Unión Española (loan)	22	(2)
2020	→ Unión La Calera (loan)	0	(0)
2020–2021	→ Unión Española (loan)	17	(2)
2022	Santiago Morning	23	(2)
2023	Universidad de Concepción	23	(4)
2024	Magallanes	26	(4)
2025	Ñublense	14	(0)
2026	Deportes Temuco	21	(0)
- * Club domestic league appearances and goals as of 11 November 2025

Rodrigo Antonio González Catalán (born 30 November 1995) is a Chilean professional footballer who plays as a right-back.

== Career ==
After staying in the Youth Teams of Palestino and Santiago Wanderers, he played for General Velásquez, Colchagua and Chimbarongo F.C. at the Tercera A, the fourth level of the Chilean football. Along with Colchagua, he won the 2014 Tercera A Championship.

In the Summer 2016, he joined San Luis de Quillota in the Chilean Primera División, first playing at the under-19 level and making his professional debut in a match against Palestino on 21 August 2016. After San Luis was relegated to Primera B, he was loaned to Unión Española for the 2019 season, returning on second half 2020 after his stay on loan at Unión La Calera. For the 2021 Primera B, he returned to San Luis.

In 2024, González joined Magallanes. The next year, he switched to Ñublense.

In January 2026, González joined Deportes Temuco.

== Personal life ==
He is nicknamed Huaso, like the traditional countryman of the Central Chile, due to the fact his birthplace is San Vicente de Tagua Tagua, a city in the O'Higgins Region.

== Honours ==
Colchagua

- Tercera A: 2014
