= Facundo Castro =

Argentine footballer

Personal information
- Full name: Facundo Alfredo Castro
- Date of birth: February 28, 1996 (age 30)
- Place of birth: San Miguel del Monte, Argentina
- Height: 1.84 m (6 ft 0 in)
- Position: Forward

Team information
- Current team: Colón

Youth career
- Racing

Senior career*
Years	Team	Apps	(Gls)
2014–2018	Racing	7	(0)
2015	→ Unión Santa Fe (loan)	2	(0)
2016–2017	→ Santamarina (loan)	45	(4)
2017–2018	→ All Boys (loan)	20	(4)
2018–2020	Barracas	40	(7)
2020	Cobresal	12	(0)
2021	Temuco	26	(1)
2022	Barracas	23	(1)
2023	Quilmes	28	(4)
2024	Nueva Chicago	40	(13)
2025	Melgar	11	(5)
2025–	Colón	17	(1)
- * Club domestic league appearances and goals as of 19:11, 20 March 2026 (UTC)

Facundo Alfredo Castro (born February 28, 1996) is an Argentinian football forward playing for Colón.

== Career ==
Castro made his professional debut in 2014 when he was substituted for Diego Milito in a 4–0 defeat to Tigre. His second appearance came in a defeat to Atlético de Rafaela, 2 to 0. In spite of having played in no further games in the tournament, he won the national title with La Academia. In the reserve tournament Racing were runners-up to Rosario Central and Castro scored 11 goals in 15 games.

== Statistics ==
Club	Div	Season	League		National cup		International cups		Total	
Club	Div	Season	Apps.	Goals	Apps.	Goals	Apps.	Goals	Apps.	Goals
Racing; Argentina	1ª	2014	2	0	0	0	0	0	2	0
Racing; Argentina	1ª	2015	5	0	0	0	0	0	5	0
Racing; Argentina	Club total		7	0	0	0	0	0	7	0
Total			7	0	0	0	0	0	7	0

== Honours ==
=== Titles ===
Title	Club	Country	Year
Torneo Transición	Racing Club	Argentina	2014
