= Álvaro Césped =

Chilean footballer (born 1991)

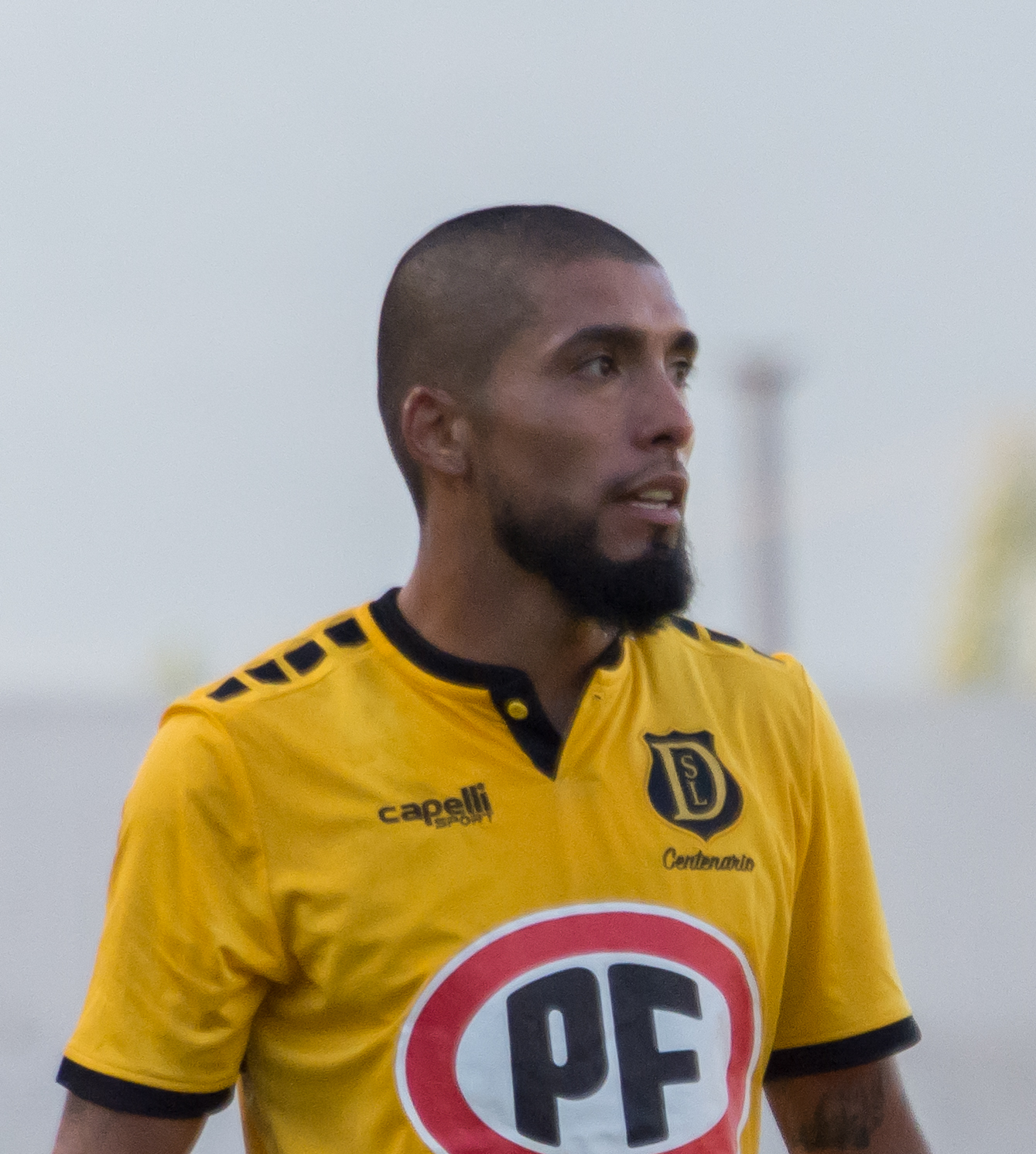
- Césped with San Luis de Quillota in 2019

Personal information
- Full name: Álvaro Felipe Césped Lártiga
- Date of birth: October 10, 1991 (age 35)
- Place of birth: Quillota, Chile
- Height: 1.63 m (5 ft 4 in)
- Position: Midfielder

Team information
- Current team: San Luis

Youth career
- San Luis

Senior career*
Years	Team	Apps	(Gls)
2010–2020	San Luis	176	(12)
2016	→ Gimnasia de Jujuy (loan)	8	(0)
2018	→ Unión La Calera (loan)	28	(1)
2021	Cobreloa	23	(1)
2022	Unión San Felipe	27	(1)
2023	Deportes Recoleta	15	(0)
2024	Deportes Limache	30	(0)
2025–	San Luis	0	(0)
- * Club domestic league appearances and goals as of 25 December 2024

Álvaro Felipe Césped Lártiga (born October 10, 1991) is a Chilean footballer who plays as a midfielder for San Luis de Quillota.

== Career ==
In 2024, Césped joined Deportes Limache in the Primera B. The next season, he returned to San Luis de Quillota, his first club.

== Honors ==
San Luis de Quillota

- Primera B de Chile (2): 2013 Apertura, 2014–15
