= Hans Salinas =

Chilean footballer (born 1990)

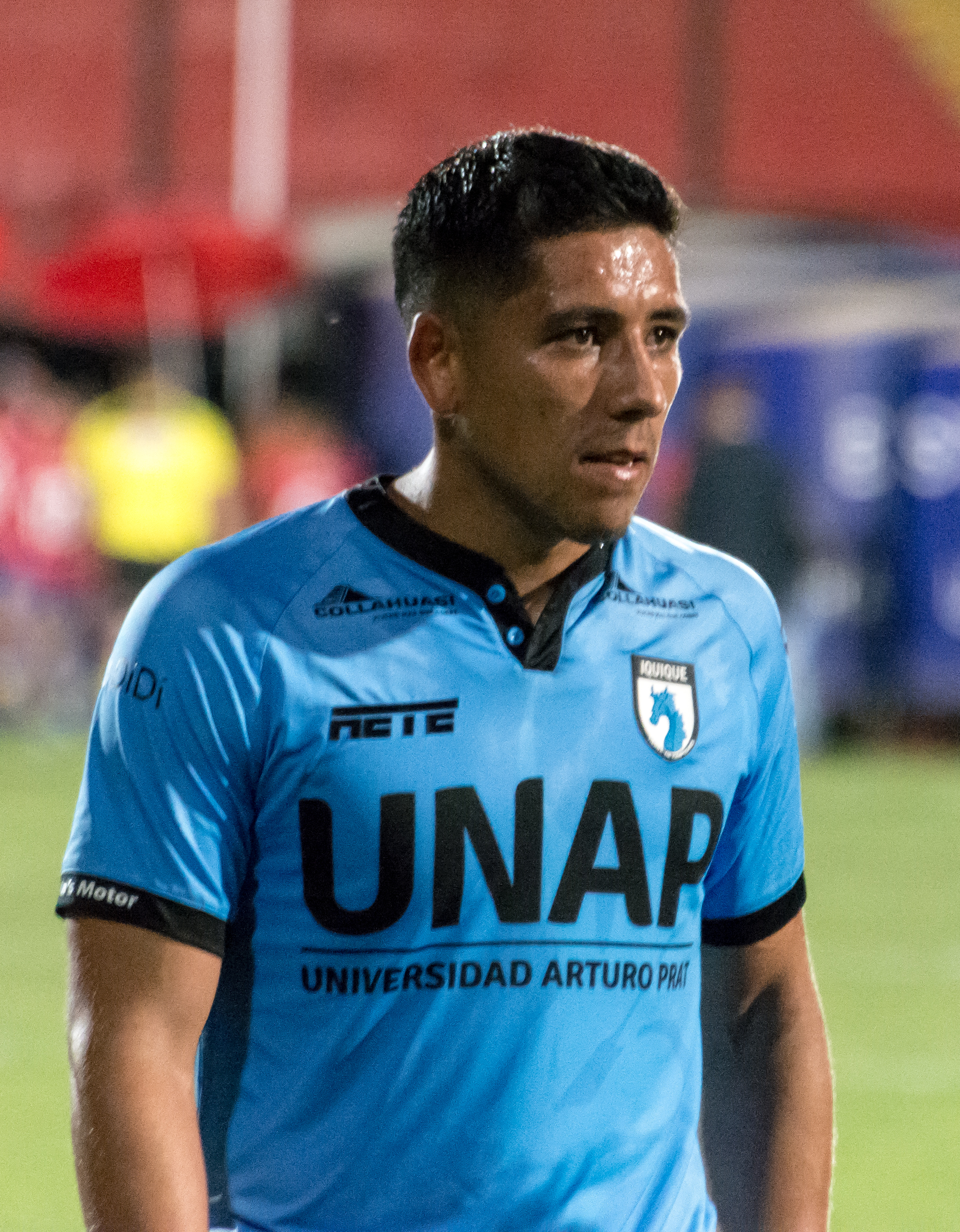
- Salinas with Deportes Iquique in 2020

Personal information
- Full name: Hans Francisco Salinas Flores
- Date of birth: 23 April 1990 (age 36)
- Place of birth: El Salvador, Chile
- Height: 1.70 m (5 ft 7 in)
- Position: Left midfielder

Team information
- Current team: Magallanes
- Number: 30

Youth career
- 2003–2008: Cobresal

Senior career*
Years	Team	Apps	(Gls)
2008–2014	Cobresal	129	(13)
2015–2016	Universidad de Concepción	12	(1)
2016–2017	Deportes La Serena	26	(3)
2017–2025	Deportes Iquique	194	(25)
2026–	Magallanes	0	(0)

International career
2007	Chile U17	3	(0)
- * Club domestic league appearances and goals as of 8 December 2025

Hans Francisco Salinas Flores (born 23 April 1990) is a Chilean footballer who plays as a left midfielder for Magallanes.

== Career ==
A historical player for Deportes Iquique, Salinas spent nine seasons with them from 2017 to 2025.

In February 2026, Salinas joined Magallanes.
