= 2015–16 Campeonato Nacional Primera B =

Primera B de Chile
- Season: 2015–16

The 2015–16 Primera B de Chile was the 63rd season of Chile's second-flight football. The competition began on July 25, 2015, and ends in May, 2016.

== Participating teams ==
=== Stadia and locations ===
Locations of 2015–16 Primera B de Chile teams

Team	Stadium	Capacity
Barnechea	Municipal de Lo Barnechea	3,000
Cobreloa	Zorros del Desierto	12,000
Coquimbo Unido	Francisco Sánchez Rumoroso	18,750
Curicó Unido	La Granja	8,000
Deportes Concepción	Alcaldesa Ester Roa Rebolledo	30,448
Deportes Copiapó	Luis Valenzuela Hermosilla	8,000
Deportes La Serena	La Portada	18,243
Deportes Puerto Montt	Chinquihue	10,000
Deportes Temuco	Germán Becker	18,413
Everton	Sausalito	22,360
Iberia	Municipal de Los Ángeles	4,150
Magallanes	Municipal de San Bernardo	3,500
Ñublense	Nelson Oyarzún	12,000
Rangers de Talca	Fiscal de Talca	8,200
Santiago Morning	Santiago Bueras	5,000
Unión San Felipe	Municipal de San Felipe	12,000

== First stage ==
=== League table (Apertura) ===
Pos	Team	Pld	W	D	L	GF	GA	GD	Pts	Qualification
1	Deportes Temuco (A)	15	10	4	1	30	15	+15	34	Qualification to the Play-offs
2	Everton (A)	15	9	1	5	25	16	+9	28	Qualification to the Play-offs
3	Cobreloa (A)	15	8	3	4	22	14	+8	27	Qualification to the Play-offs
4	Deportes La Serena (A)	15	7	4	4	21	17	+4	25	Qualification to the Play-offs
5	Curicó Unido	15	6	6	3	19	11	+8	24	
6	Rangers	15	7	2	6	18	21	−3	23	
7	Unión San Felipe	15	6	4	5	17	11	+6	22	
8	Ñublense	15	5	6	4	26	20	+6	21	
9	Deportes Puerto Montt	15	5	5	5	15	16	−1	20	
10	Deportes Copiapó	15	5	4	6	12	12	0	19	
11	Magallanes	15	5	4	6	18	22	−4	19	
12	Iberia	15	4	5	6	21	24	−3	17	
13	Deportes Concepción	15	3	5	7	15	19	−4	14	
14	Santiago Morning	15	3	4	8	19	33	−14	13	
15	Barnechea	15	2	6	7	14	24	−10	12	
16	Coquimbo Unido	15	0	7	8	8	25	−17	7	

Updated to match(es) played on 23 February 2016. Source: Apertura
Rules for classification: 1) points; 2) goal difference; 3) number of goals scored.
(A) Advance to a further round

=== Play-offs (Apertura) ===
==== Semi-finals ====
===== First leg =====
27 November 2015	Cobreloa	0–1	Everton	Estadio Zorros del Desierto, Calama
16:30		Report	Ceratto 84'	Attendance: 3,142; Referee: Felipe Gonzalez

27 November 2015	Deportes La Serena	4–1	Deportes Temuco	Estadio La Portada, La Serena
20:00	Salazar 20'; Maldonado 59'; Briceño 74', 84'	Report	Comba 90'	Attendance: 8,338; Referee: Patricio Blanca

===== Second leg =====
4 December 2015	Everton	3–0 (4–0 agg.)	Cobreloa	Estadio Sausalito, Viña del Mar
21:00	Riffo 31'; Díaz 56'; Viotti 81'	Report		Attendance: 9,548; Referee: Carlos Ulloa

6 December 2015	Deportes Temuco	3–1 (4–5 agg.)	Deportes La Serena	Estadio Municipal Germán Becker, Temuco
20:00	Comba 45' (pen.), 75'; Sanhueza 67'	Report	Campana 39'	Attendance: 8,756; Referee: Roberto Tobar

==== Final ====
===== First leg =====
12 December 2015	Deportes La Serena	0–0	Everton	Estadio La Portada, La Serena
18:00		Report		Attendance: 13,013; Referee: Patricio Polic

===== Second leg =====
19 December 2015	Everton	2–1 (2–1 agg.)	Deportes La Serena	Estadio Sausalito, Viña del Mar
18:00	Salinas 45'; Viotti 76'	Report	Montecinos 68'	Attendance: 10,668; Referee: Enrique Osses

== Second stage ==
=== League table (Clausura) ===
Pos	Team	Pld	W	D	L	GF	GA	GD	Pts	Qualification
1	Curicó Unido	11	7	3	1	26	9	+17	24	Qualification to the Play-offs
2	Deportes Temuco	11	6	3	2	19	13	+6	21	
3	Deportes Concepción	11	5	4	2	15	13	+2	19	Qualification to the Play-offs
4	Deportes Puerto Montt	12	6	1	5	17	19	−2	19	Qualification to the Play-offs
5	Deportes Copiapó	12	5	3	4	13	11	+2	18	Qualification to the Play-offs
6	Unión San Felipe	11	4	5	2	13	8	+5	17	
7	Rangers	11	4	5	2	13	10	+3	17	
8	Iberia	11	4	4	3	15	9	+6	16	
9	Coquimbo Unido	12	3	5	4	20	24	−4	14	
10	Cobreloa	12	3	5	4	14	18	−4	14	
11	Magallanes	12	3	4	5	14	17	−3	13	
12	Everton	12	3	4	5	12	17	−5	13	
13	Deportes La Serena	11	3	3	5	15	15	0	12	
14	Ñublense	11	4	0	7	15	23	−8	12	
15	Santiago Morning	12	2	5	5	17	22	−5	11	
16	Barnechea	12	2	2	8	8	22	−14	8	

Updated to match(es) played on 2 March 2016. Source: Clausura
Rules for classification: 1) points; 2) goal difference; 3) number of goals scored.

== Aggregate table ==
Pos	Team	Pld	W	D	L	GF	GA	GD	Pts	Promotion or relegation
1	Deportes Temuco	26	16	7	3	49	28	+21	55	Promotion to 2016–17 Primera División
2	Curicó Unido	26	13	9	4	45	20	+25	48	
3	Everton	27	12	5	10	40	33	+7	41	Promotion to 2016–17 Primera División
4	Cobreloa	27	11	8	8	36	32	+4	41	
5	Rangers	26	11	7	8	31	31	0	40	
6	Unión San Felipe	26	10	9	7	30	19	+11	39	
7	Deportes Puerto Montt	27	11	6	10	32	35	−3	39	
8	Deportes La Serena	26	10	7	9	36	32	+4	37	
9	Deportes Copiapó	27	10	7	10	26	23	+3	37	
10	Iberia	26	8	9	9	36	33	+3	33	
11	Ñublense	26	9	6	11	41	43	−2	33	
12	Deportes Concepción	26	8	9	9	30	32	−2	33	
13	Magallanes	27	8	8	11	29	36	−7	32	
14	Santiago Morning	27	5	9	13	36	55	−19	24	
15	Coquimbo Unido	27	3	12	12	28	49	−21	21	
16	Barnechea	27	4	8	15	22	46	−24	20	Relegation to 2016–17 Segunda División Profesional

== See also ==
- 2015–16 Chilean Primera División season
- 2015–16 Segunda División Profesional de Chile
