= Alejandro Fiorina =

Argentine footballer

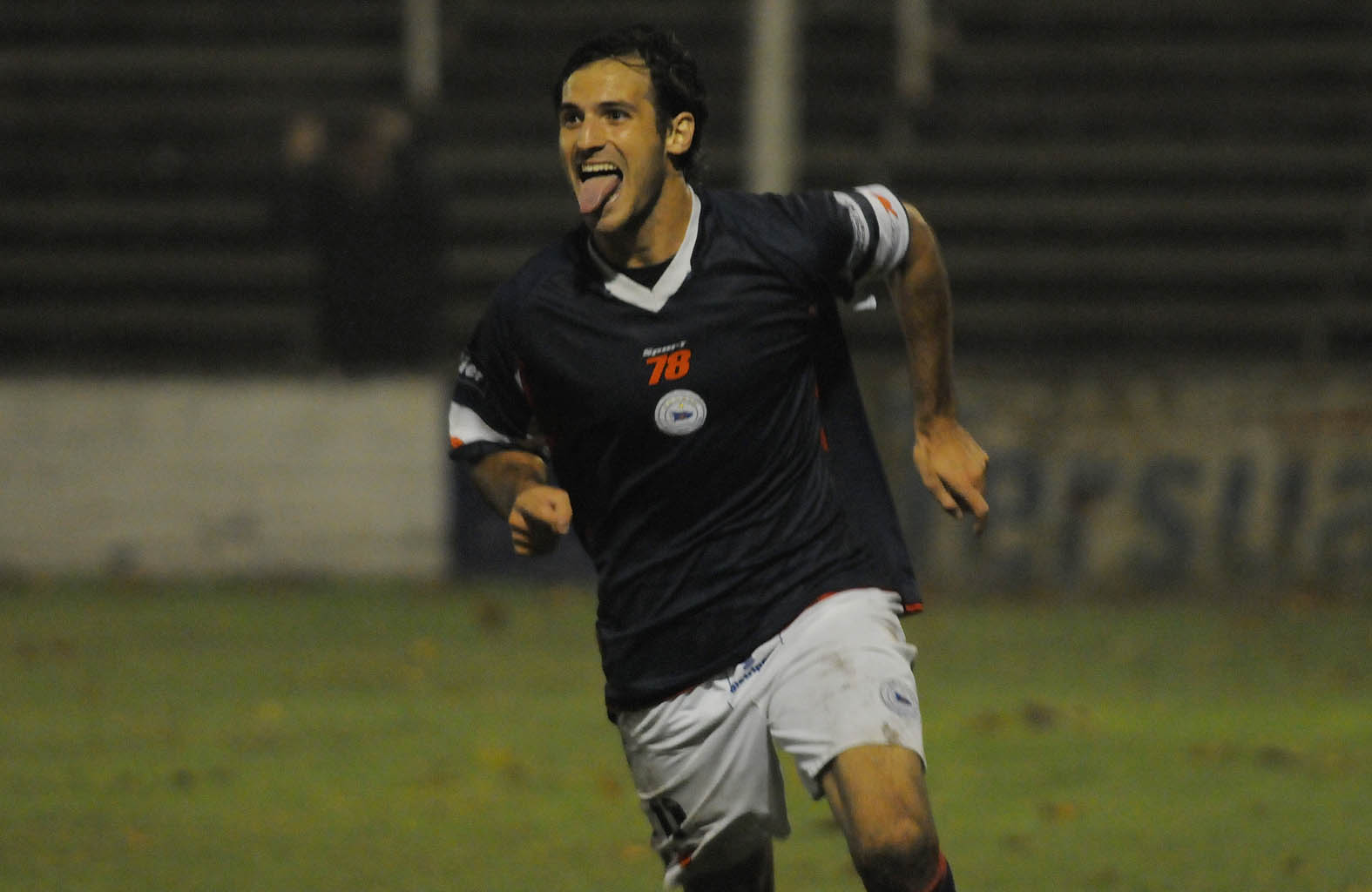
- Fiorina in 2011

Personal information
- Full name: Alejandro David Fiorina
- Date of birth: 11 March 1988 (age 38)
- Place of birth: Rosario, Argentina
- Height: 1.91 m (6 ft 3 in)
- Position: Forward

Youth career
- Estudiantes LP

Senior career*
Years	Team	Apps	(Gls)
2010	Estudiantes LP	0	(0)
2010	Grupo Universitario	4	(0)
2010–2011	Central Córdoba	38	(11)
2011–2012	Comercial	–	(–)
2012–2013	Central Córdoba	26	(6)
2013–2017	San Luis	60	(22)
2014–2015	→ Coquimbo Unido (loan)	35	(10)
2018	Ñublense	10	(1)
Total		173	(50)
- * Club domestic league appearances and goals

Alejandro David Fiorina (born 11 March 1988) is an Argentine former professional footballer who played as a forward.
