= Leonardo Olivera =

Chilean footballer (born 1987)

Personal information
- Full name: Leonardo Andrés Olivera Troncoso
- Date of birth: 8 June 1987 (age 39)
- Place of birth: Curacaví, Chile
- Position: Striker

Senior career*
Years	Team	Apps	(Gls)
2007	Unión Quilpué		
2008	Deportes Temuco		
2009	Pachuca		
2009	→ Everton (loan)		
2009	Deportes Temuco		
2010	Naval	4	(0)
2010	Cobreloa	4	(0)
2011–2012	Vasalunds IF	23	(9)
2012	San Luis	16	(6)
2012	Unión San Felipe	5	(0)
2013–2014	Magallanes	22	(3)
2015	Iberia	1	(0)
2015	Sitra Club		(2)
2016–2017	Curicó Unido	20	(8)
2017	San Marcos	15	(4)
2018	Deportes Valdivia	20	(3)
2018–2020	Deportes Melipilla	15	(1)
2020	Cobresal	15	(3)
2021	Cobreloa	15	(2)
- * Club domestic league appearances and goals as of 15 July 2022

Leonardo Andrés Olivera Troncoso (born 8 June 1987) is a retired Chilean footballer who played as a striker.

== Career ==
Olivera started his senior career with Unión Quilpué.

In 2010, he signed for C.D. Cobreloa in the Chilean Primera División, where he made five appearances and scored zero goals. After that, he played for Deportes Temuco, Naval, Cobreloa, San Luis de Quillota, Unión San Felipe, Magallanes, Deportes Iberia, Curicó Unido, San Marcos de Arica, Deportes Valdivia, and Deportes Melipilla.

Abroad, Olivera played for Pachuca, Vasalunds IF and Sitra Club.

He retired in 2021, last playing for Cobreloa.

== Coaching career ==
Following his retirement, Olivera started the football academy "Academia Golden" in his hometown, Curacaví, and made an alliance with Glen Burnie Soccer Club in Maryland, United States. In 2025, he joined the technical staff of Swiss club FC Perly-Certoux.
