= Bryan Cortés =

Chilean footballer (born 1991)

- Bryan Cortés with Cobreloa.

Personal information
- Full name: Bryan Alfonso Cortés Carvajal
- Date of birth: 19 August 1991 (age 35)
- Place of birth: Calama, Chile
- Height: 1.79 m (5 ft 10 in)
- Position: Midfielder

Youth career
- 1998–2010: Cobreloa

Senior career*
Years	Team	Apps	(Gls)
2009–2013	Cobreloa	85	(4)
2013–2017	Universidad de Chile	19	(0)
2015–2016	→ Santiago Wanderers (loan)	19	(0)
2016–2017	→ Deportes La Serena (loan)	20	(4)
2017	Deportes La Serena	10	(0)
2018–2019	Unión San Felipe	41	(8)
2019–2021	Deportes Melipilla	24	(1)
2021	Cobreloa	21	(1)
2022	Deportes Recoleta	6	(0)
2023	Eléctrico Refinería	1	(0)
Total		246	(18)
- * Club domestic league appearances and goals

Bryan Alfonso Cortés Carvajal (born 19 August 1991), known as Bryan Cortés, is a Chilean former footballer who played as a midfielder.

== Career ==
A product of Cobreloa youth system, he signed with Universidad de Chile in 2013, being compared to the Chile international Charles Aránguiz due to his playing style.

After playing for Deportes Recoleta in the 2022 season and having no offers, he retired at the beginning of 2023. However, he joined club Eléctrico Refinería from Calama for the 2023 Copa Chile alongside the former professional footballers Sebastián Romero and Nicolás Dávila.

== Post-retirement ==
Subsequently, his retirement from playing, Cortés began to study Industrial engineering. He is also a Heavy vehicle and mobile equipment Technician and began to work at Radomiro Tomic mine.

== Honours ==
Universidad de Chile

- Chilean Primera División: 2014 Apertura
