= Rincón, Catamarca =

Coordinates: 28°13′17″S 66°08′37″W

Rincón
- Municipality and village
- Interactive map of Rincón
- Country: Argentina
- Province: Catamarca Province
- Time zone: UTC−3 (ART)

Rincón is a village and municipality in Catamarca Province in northwestern Argentina.
