= Brian Torrealba =

Chilean footballer (born 1997)

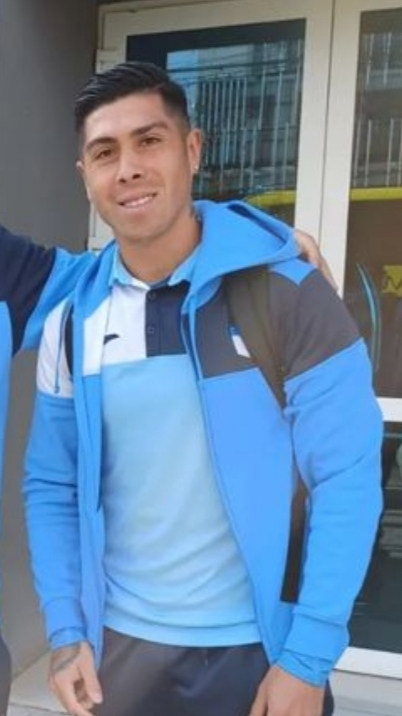
- Torrealba with O'Higgins in 2024

Personal information
- Full name: Brian Nicolás Torrealba Silva
- Date of birth: 14 July 1997 (age 29)
- Place of birth: Rancagua, Chile
- Height: 1.78 m (5 ft 10 in)
- Position: Defender

Team information
- Current team: Deportes Temuco
- Number: 35

Youth career
- O'Higgins

Senior career*
Years	Team	Apps	(Gls)
2014–2024	O'Higgins	138	(2)
2018	→ Rangers (loan)	25	(3)
2025	Deportes Limache	10	(1)
2026–	Deportes Temuco	0	(0)

International career
2015	Chile U20		
- * Club domestic league appearances and goals as of 10 February 2026

Brian Nicolás Torrealba Silva (born 14 July 1997) is a Chilean footballer who plays as a defender for Deportes Temuco.

== Club career ==
Torrealba started his career at Primera División de Chile club O'Higgins. He progressed from the under categories club all the way to the senior team. He made his debut in the first team on 15 May 2013, in the match against Santiago Wanderers, playing the 90 minutes.

In the 2015–16 Clausura, Torrealba was runner-up with O'Higgins, after losing in the last matchday against Universidad de Concepción, with Universidad Católica being the champions of the Campeonato Nacional.

In 2025, Torrealba signed with Deportes Limache. The next year, he switched to Deportes Temuco.

== International career ==
With the Chilean U20 team, he won the L'Alcúdia Tournament in 2015. He also took part in the 2015 South American U-20 Championship.

== Honours ==
Chile U-20

- L'Alcúdia International Football Tournament: 2015
