= Carlos Espinosa =

Chilean footballer (born 1982)

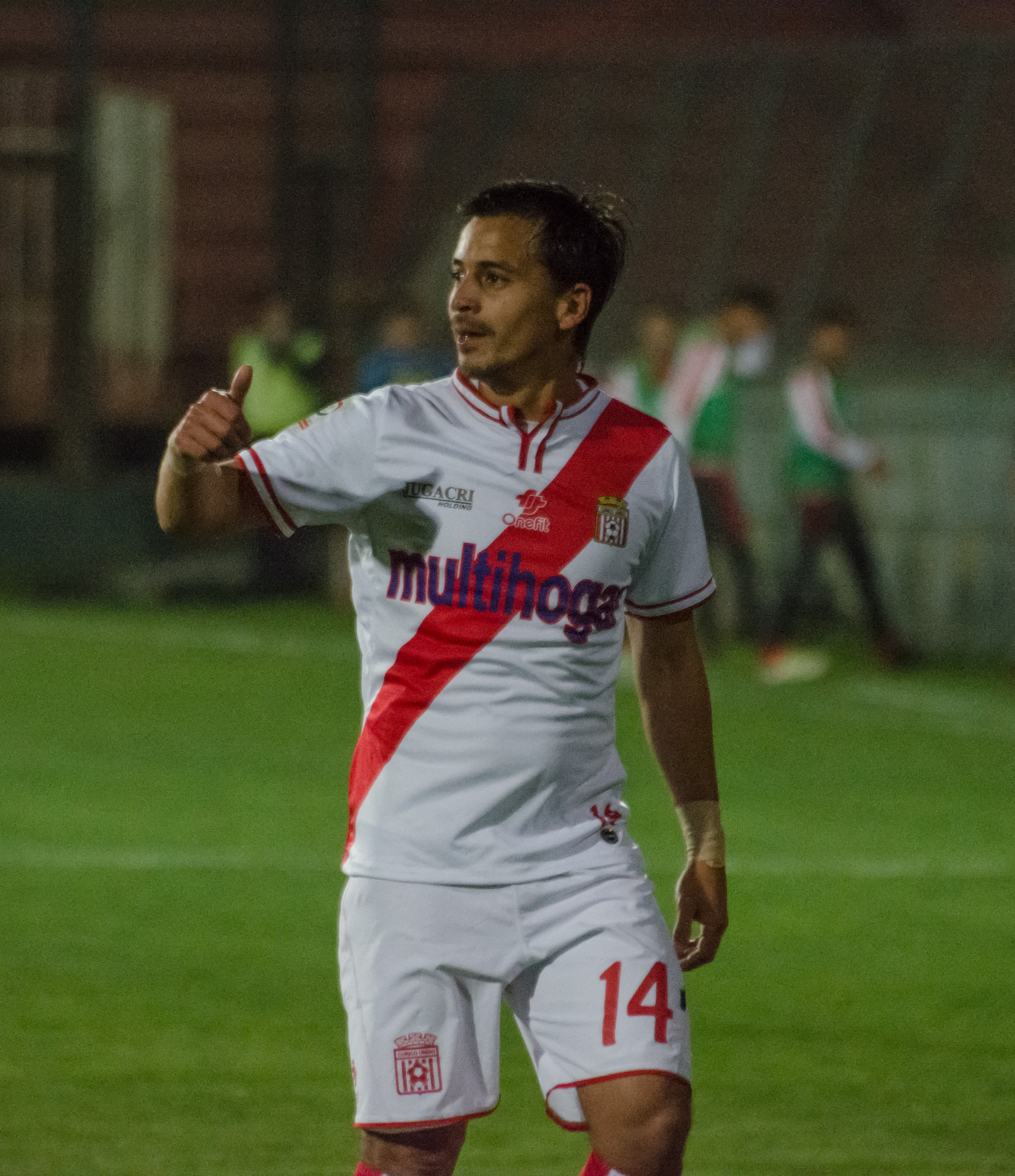
- Espinosa with Curicó Unido in 2018

Personal information
- Full name: Carlos Felipe Ignacio Espinosa Contreras
- Date of birth: 22 November 1982 (age 43)
- Place of birth: Santiago, Chile
- Height: 1.72 m (5 ft 8 in)
- Position: Attacking midfielder

Youth career
- Colo-Colo

College career
Years	Team	Apps	(Gls)
- Universidad Gabriela Mistral

Senior career*
Years	Team	Apps	(Gls)
2004	Cobreloa	1	(0)
2005	Palestino	3	(0)
2006	Curicó Unido	30	(11)
2007	Deportes Melipilla	16	(2)
2007	Örgryte IS	13	(1)
2008	Deportes Melipilla	26	(1)
2009–2010	Rangers	25	(1)
2011	Cobresal	14	(0)
2011	Lyubimets 2007	4	(1)
2012	Barnechea	29	(4)
2013	Coquimbo Unido	28	(3)
2014–2015	Huachipato	46	(5)
2015–2017	Universidad Católica	54	(5)
2018–2020	Curicó Unido	57	(2)
2021	Deportes Iquique	19	(3)
2022	Deportes Santa Cruz	8	(0)
2023	Rangers	9	(0)
Total		382	(39)
- * Club domestic league appearances and goals

Carlos Felipe Ignacio Espinosa Contreras (Note: In this Chilean name, the first or paternal surname is Espinosa and the second or maternal family name is Contreras.) (born 22 November 1982) is a Chilean former professional footballer who played as a midfielder.

== Career ==
Espinosa represented the Universidad Gabriela Mistral football team under Eduardo Bonvallet.

His last club was Rangers de Talca in 2023.

== Honours ==
Cobreloa

- Primera División de Chile: 2004 Clausura

Universidad Católica

- Primera División de Chile: 2016 Clausura, 2016 Apertura
- Supercopa de Chile: 2016
