= Sérgio Comba =

Argentine footballer

Sergio Comba
Personal information
- Full name: Sergio Héctor Comba
- Date of birth: October 15, 1978 (age 48)
- Place of birth: Rafaela, Argentina
- Height: 1.86 m (6 ft 1 in)
- Position: Striker

Youth career
- Atlético Rafaela

Senior career*
Years	Team	Apps	(Gls)
1996–1998	Atlético Rafaela		
1998	Sarmiento	12	(4)
1999	Ferro Carril Oeste	12	(1)
1999	Nantes	2	(0)
2000	Pistoiese	0	(0)
2000–2001	San Martín de Tucumán	7	(5)
2001–2002	Defensores de Belgrano		
2002	Huracán	13	(1)
2003	Cruz Azul Hidalgo	3	(0)
2003–2004	Defensores de Belgrano		
2004	Atlético Rafaela		
2005	San Martín de Mendoza	12	(1)
2005–2006	YF Juventus	9	(2)
2006	Sangiovannese	0	(0)
2007–2008	Celano	7	(0)
2008–2009	Defensores de Belgrano	29	(9)
2009–2012	Santiago Morning	71	(24)
2012	Cobreloa	9	(2)
2013–2014	Deportes Copiapó	42	(11)
2014–2015	San Luis de Quillota	34	(16)
2015–2016	Deportes Temuco	29	(13)
2016–2017	Rangers	36	(15)
- * Club domestic league appearances and goals as of 18 December 2017

Sergio Héctor Comba (born 15 October 1978) is a retired Argentine footballer who played as a striker.

He has played for several teams as Atlético Rafaela, Sarmiento, Ferro Carril Oeste, FC Nantes, Pistoiese, San Martín de Tucumán, Defensores, CA Huracán, Cruz Azul Hidalgo, Defensores, Atlético Rafaela, San Martín de Mendoza, YF Juventus, Sangiovannese, Celano, Defensores de Belgrano and Santiago Morning. He also had a brief spell in Ligue 1 with FC Nantes. (Note: Sérgio Comba – French league stats at LFP – also available in French (archived))

In mid 2009, Comba was signed for Santiago Morning, in this club he played a total of 34 matches and also scored a total of 17 goals.
