= Sergio Riffo =

Chilean footballer (born 1997)

Personal information
- Full name: Sergio Esteban Riffo Díaz
- Date of birth: 17 March 1997 (age 29)
- Place of birth: Valparaíso, Chile
- Height: 1.70 m (5 ft 7 in)
- Positions: Attacking midfielder; winger

Team information
- Current team: San Antonio Unido
- Number: 19

Youth career
- 2004–2015: Everton

Senior career*
Years	Team	Apps	(Gls)
2014–2016	Everton	16	(1)
2017–2019	Celaya	28	(3)
2018	→ Irapuato (loan)	19	(2)
2020	Deportes Valdivia	13	(1)
2021	Fernández Vial	11	(0)
2022–	San Antonio Unido	6	(2)

International career^{‡}
2015	Chile U20	2	(0)
- * Club domestic league appearances and goals as of 14 July 2021 ‡ National team caps and goals as of 19 October 2020

Sergio Esteban Riffo Díaz (born March 17, 1997) is a professional Chilean footballer. He was born in Valparaíso and currently plays for San Antonio Unido.

== Club career ==
After having no chances to play for Everton de Viña del Mar in the Chilean Primera División, in 2017 he moved to Mexican club Celaya in the Ascenso MX. In 2020, he returned to Chile to play for Primera B side Deportes Valdivia.
