= Camilo Melivilú =

Chilean footballer (born 1993)

Personal information
- Full name: Camilo Andrés Melivilú Fuentes
- Date of birth: 8 September 1993 (age 33)
- Place of birth: Santiago, Chile
- Height: 1.82 m (6 ft 0 in)
- Position: Forward

Team information
- Current team: San Marcos

Senior career*
Years	Team	Apps	(Gls)
2012–2017	Audax Italiano	22	(4)
2012–2017	Audax Italiano B	55	(30)
2014–2015	→ Deportes Copiapó (loan)	32	(6)
2016	→ Unión San Felipe (loan)	25	(7)
2017–2018	Coquimbo Unido	16	(3)
2018	San Luis	5	(0)
2019	San Marcos	25	(11)
2020–2021	Magallanes	19	(1)
2021	Deportes Puerto Montt	32	(6)
2022	Rangers	28	(3)
2023	Deportes Valdivia	12	(5)
2023	Deportes Puerto Montt	15	(3)
2024	Deportes Temuco	21	(2)
2025–	San Marcos	0	(0)
- * Club domestic league appearances and goals as of 18 December 2024

Camilo Andrés Melivilú Fuentes (born 8 September 1993) is a Chilean professional footballer who plays as a forward for San Marcos de Arica.

== Career ==
In 2024, Melivilú joined Deportes Temuco from Deportes Puerto Montt. The next year, he switched to San Marcos de Arica.
