= Sebastián Ramírez (footballer, born 1992) =

Uruguayan footballer

Mario Sebastián Ramírez Silva (born May 18, 1992, in Salto, Uruguay) is a Uruguayan footballer currently playing for Oriente Petrolero. He has scored 15 goals in his career, while playing 299 matches.
