= Diego Silva (footballer, born 1983) =

Chilean footballer

Personal information
- Full name: Diego Alejandro Silva Fuentes
- Date of birth: 11 March 1983 (age 43)
- Place of birth: Santiago, Chile
- Height: 1.83 m (6 ft 0 in)
- Position: Defender

Youth career
- Cobresal

Senior career*
Years	Team	Apps	(Gls)
2001–2009	Cobresal	210	(15)
2001	→ Deportes Santa Cruz (loan)	–	(–)
2010–2011	Santiago Morning	53	(1)
2012	Unión San Felipe	29	(0)
2013–2015	Cobreloa	73	(5)
2015–2018	Cobresal	50	(1)
2016–2017	→ San Luis (loan)	11	(2)
2019–2021	Deportes Santa Cruz	46	(3)
2021	Deportes Recoleta	8	(0)
2022	Real San Joaquín	21	(1)
Total		501	(28)

Managerial career
- 2023–2025: Cobresal (youth)
- 2025–: Cobresal (assistant)
- * Club domestic league appearances and goals

Diego Alejandro Silva Fuentes (born 11 March 1983) is a Chilean former footballer who played as a defender.

== Career ==
A historical player of Cobresal and Cobreloa, he retired from football after twenty one years as a professional football player at the end of 2022 season.

Following his retirement, Silva assumed as coach for the Cobresal youth ranks and later he assumed as assistant coach of Gustavo Huerta for the first team.
