= 2017 Copa Chile =

Copa Chile MTS

Tournament details
- Country: Chile
- Teams: 32

Final positions
- Champions: Santiago Wanderers (3rd title)
- Runners-up: Universidad de Chile
- Copa Libertadores: Santiago Wanderers

Tournament statistics
- Matches played: 61
- Goals scored: 158 (2.59 per match)
- Top goal scorer: Jorge Ortega (6 goals)

The 2017 Copa Chile, (officially known as Copa Chile MTS 2017 because of its sponsorship), was the 38th edition of the Copa Chile, the country's national cup tournament. The competition started on 9 July 2017 with the first round and ended on 11 November 2017. Santiago Wanderers were the winners, beating Universidad de Chile 3–1 in the final to win their third title and first since 1961, and qualified for the 2018 Copa Libertadores.

== Format ==
The 2017 Copa Chile is based on a system of direct elimination with double-legged ties, similar to the Copa del Rey. All participating teams start the competition in the first round, with the 16 Primera B teams being drawn against the 16 Primera División teams.

== Prizes ==
The champions of this edition earned the right to compete in the 2018 Copa Libertadores as Chile 3 (qualifying to the second round of the continental tournament). Besides, they also earned the right to play the 2018 Supercopa de Chile. The runners-up would be able to qualify for the 2018 Copa Sudamericana, taking the Chile 4 berth for that tournament, however, since runners-up Universidad de Chile had already qualified for the Copa Libertadores, the Copa Sudamericana berth was passed to the league.

== Schedule ==
| Round | Date |
|---|---|
| First Round | July 9, 2017; July 22, 2017 |
| Round of 16 | August 23, 2017; September 6, 2017 |
| Quarterfinals | September 13, 2017; October 9, 2017 |
| Semifinals | October 18, 2017; October 25, 2017 |
| Final | November 11, 2017 |

== First round ==
The first legs were played on 9–22 July, and the second legs will be played on 21–23 July and 2–9 August 2017.

| Team 1 | Agg. | Team 2 | 1st leg | 2nd leg |
|---|---|---|---|---|
| Deportes Puerto Montt | 0–2 | Deportes Temuco | 0–0 | 0–2 |
| Barnechea | 2–6 | Audax Italiano | 1–2 | 1–4 |
| O'Higgins | 4–3 | Santiago Morning | 1–3 | 3–0 |
| San Marcos de Arica | 2–1 | Deportes Iquique | 2–0 | 0–1 |
| Iberia | 4–0 | Universidad de Concepción | 2–0 | 2–0 |
| Deportes La Serena | 4–5 | Colo-Colo | 4–1 | 0–4 |
| Cobresal | 2–3 | Santiago Wanderers | 2–0 | 0–3 |
| Rangers | 1–4 | Universidad Católica | 0–1 | 1–3 |
| Deportes Copiapó | 2–3 | San Luis | 2–1 | 0–2 |
| Coquimbo Unido | 4–3 | Everton | 3–2 | 1–1 |
| Magallanes | 1–2 | Curicó Unido | 1–1 | 0–1 |
| Unión San Felipe | 2–2 (5–4 p) | Unión Española | 1–2 | 1–0 |
| Unión La Calera | 2–3 | Palestino | 1–1 | 1–2 |
| Ñublense | 0–4 | Universidad de Chile | 0–2 | 0–2 |
| Cobreloa | 1–2 | Deportes Antofagasta | 0–1 | 1–1 |
| Deportes Valdivia | 1–6 | Huachipato | 1–2 | 0–4 |

=== First leg ===
| 9 July 2017 | Rangers | 0–1 | Universidad Católica | Talca |
| 12:00 | | Report | Lanaro 4' | Stadium: Estadio Fiscal; Attendance: 4,556; Referee: Piero Maza |

| 9 July 2017 | Deportes La Serena | 4–1 | Colo-Colo | La Serena |
| 15:30 | Mosquera 21', 90+2'; Suazo 57'; Becica 88' (pen.) | Report | E. Paredes 83' | Stadium: Estadio La Portada; Attendance: 9,174; Referee: Jorge Osorio |

| 9 July 2017 | Deportes Valdivia | 1–2 | Huachipato | Valdivia |
| 15:30 | Lagües 11' | Report | Verdugo 18'; Bizama 39' | Stadium: Parque Municipal; Attendance: 1,557; Referee: Christian Andaur |

| 14 July 2017 | Barnechea | 1–2 | Audax Italiano | Lo Barnechea, Santiago |
| 19:00 | Luttecke 14' | Report | Santos 54'; Carrasco 79' (pen.) | Stadium: Municipal de Lo Barnechea; Attendance: 810; Referee: Felipe Jara |

| 15 July 2017 | Cobresal | 2–0 | Santiago Wanderers | El Salvador |
| 15:00 | Cantero 5'; J. Romo 90+2' | Report | | Stadium: Estadio El Cobre; Attendance: 438; Referee: Christian Rojas |

| 15 July 2017 | Deportes Puerto Montt | 0–0 | Deportes Temuco | Puerto Montt |
| 18:00 | | Report | | Stadium: Chinquihue; Attendance: 5,187; Referee: Piero Maza |

| 15 July 2017 | Unión La Calera | 1–1 | Palestino | Quillota |
| 20:45 | Viotti 6' (pen.) | Report | Rojas 46' | Stadium: Estadio Lucio Fariña; Attendance: 531; Referee: Felipe González |

| 16 July 2017 | Coquimbo Unido | 3–2 | Everton | Coquimbo |
| 12:00 | Reymúndez 9'; Ledezma 24' (pen.), 75' (pen.) | Report | Becerra 10'; Cuevas 32' | Stadium: Francisco Sánchez Rumoroso; Attendance: 2,046; Referee: Julio Bascuñán |

| 16 July 2017 | Iberia | 2–0 | Universidad de Concepción | Los Ángeles |
| 15:30 | Asken 56'; D. González 88' | Report | | Stadium: Estadio Municipal; Attendance: 829; Referee: Patricio Polic |

| 16 July 2017 | Ñublense | 0–2 | Universidad de Chile | Chillán |
| 15:30 | | Report | Arancibia 35'; Monzón 80' | Stadium: Estadio Nelson Oyarzún; Attendance: 7,758; Referee: Héctor Jona |

| 16 July 2017 | San Marcos de Arica | 2–0 | Deportes Iquique | Arica |
| 16:00 | Olivera 30'; S. González 53' | Report | | Stadium: Estadio Carlos Dittborn; Attendance: 2,256; Referee: Eduardo Gamboa |

| 16 July 2017 | Deportes Copiapó | 2–1 | San Luis de Quillota | Vallenar |
| 16:00 | Millán 26'; Gómez 84' | Report | Caballero 23' | Stadium: Estadio Municipal Nelson Rojas; Attendance: 430; Referee: Omar Oporto |

| 16 July 2017 | Cobreloa | 0–1 | Deportes Antofagasta | Calama |
| 16:00 | | Report | Briceño 52' | Stadium: Estadio Zorros del Desierto; Attendance: 3,495; Referee: Francisco Gilabert |

| 16 July 2017 | Unión San Felipe | 1–2 | Unión Española | Quillota |
| 18:00 | Orellana 22' (pen.) | Report | Pinares 4'; Muñoz 18' | Stadium: Estadio Lucio Fariña; Referee: Rafael Troncoso |

| 18 July 2017 | Magallanes | 1–1 | Curicó Unido | San Bernardo |
| 15:00 | Núñez 59' | Report | Vargas 31' | Stadium: Municipal de San Bernardo; Attendance: 740; Referee: Benjamín Saravia |
Note: The match was originally scheduled for 15 July 2017, but was postponed due to a snow storm that affected the cities of Santiago and Rancagua.

| 22 July 2017 | O'Higgins | 1–3 | Santiago Morning | Rancagua |
| 16:00 | Calandria 56' | Report | Cerón 18', 80'; Gatica 90' | Stadium: Estadio El Teniente; Attendance: 3,214; Referee: Jorge Osorio |
Note: The match was originally scheduled for 15 July 2017, but was postponed due to a snow storm that affected the cities of Santiago and Rancagua.

=== Second leg ===
| 21 July 2017 | Santiago Wanderers | 3–0 (3–2 agg.) | Cobresal | Valparaíso |
| 19:30 | Piña 21'; Cerezo 82'; E. Gutiérrez 90+3' | Report | | Stadium: Estadio Elías Figueroa Brander; Attendance: 5,445; Referee: Eduardo Gamboa |

| 22 July 2017 | Everton | 1–1 (3–4 agg.) | Coquimbo Unido | Viña del Mar |
| 12:00 | Mugni 39' | Report | Ledezma 31' | Stadium: Estadio Sausalito; Attendance: 3,050; Referee: Francisco Gilabert |

| 22 July 2017 | Huachipato | 4–0 (6–1 agg.) | Deportes Valdivia | Talcahuano |
| 15:00 | C. Valenzuela 18'; Parraguez 33'; Soteldo 38'; Ortega 40' | Report | | Stadium: Estadio CAP; Attendance: 851; Referee: Rafael Troncoso |

| 22 July 2017 | Deportes Temuco | 2–0 (2–0 agg.) | Deportes Puerto Montt | Temuco |
| 15:00 | Donoso 34'; Farfán 85' | Report | | Stadium: Estadio Germán Becker; Attendance: 4,438; Referee: César Deischler |

| 22 July 2017 | Unión Española | 0–1 (2–2 agg.) (4–5 p) | Unión San Felipe | Independencia, Santiago |
| 15:00 | | Report | Pío 70' | Stadium: Estadio Santa Laura; Attendance: 1,801; Referee: Cristián Andaur |
| | Penalties |
| | Pinares (penalty scored); Muñoz (penalty scored); Larenas (penalty scored); Mancilla (penalty missed); Jaime (penalty scored) | | (penalty scored) Méndez; (penalty scored) Ri. González; (penalty scored) Pío; (penalty scored) F. Cortés; (penalty scored) Orellana |

| 22 July 2017 | San Luis de Quillota | 2–0 (3–2 agg.) | Deportes Copiapó | Quillota |
| 17:00 | Saavedra 29'; Cesped 90+2' (pen.) | Report | | Stadium: Estadio Lucio Fariña; Attendance: 1,740; Referee: Ángelo Hermosilla |

| 22 July 2017 | Universidad de Chile | 2–0 (4–0 agg.) | Ñublense | Ñuñoa, Santiago |
| 18:00 | Y. Leiva 4'; Benegas 74' | Report | | Stadium: Estadio Nacional; Attendance: 31,879; Referee: Ángelo Hermosilla |

| 22 July 2017 | Curicó Unido | 1–0 (2–1 agg.) | Magallanes | Curicó |
| 18:00 | Rebolledo 89' (pen.) | Report | | Stadium: Estadio La Granja; Attendance: 2,263; Referee: Fabián Aracena |

| 22 July 2017 | Universidad de Concepción | 0–2 (0–4 agg.) | Iberia | Concepción |
| 18:30 | | Report | Baeza 30'; D. González 69' | Stadium: Estadio Ester Roa; Attendance: 1,057; Referee: Christian Rojas |

| 22 July 2017 | Audax Italiano | 4–1 (6–2 agg.) | Barnechea | La Florida, Santiago |
| 20:00 | Carrasco 23'; J. Leiva 45', 77', 90+4' | Report | Rivera 69' | Stadium: Estadio Bicentenario de La Florida; Attendance: 925; Referee: Claudio Aranda |

| 23 July 2017 | Deportes Iquique | 1–0 (1–2 agg.) | San Marcos de Arica | Iquique |
| 12:00 | Salinas 47' | Report | | Stadium: Estadio Cavancha; Attendance: 1,985; Referee: Patricio Polic |

| 23 July 2017 | Palestino | 2–1 (3–2 agg.) | Unión La Calera | La Cisterna, Santiago |
| 15:30 | R. Gutiérrez 20'; Carmona 88' | Report | Abán 5' | Stadium: Estadio Municipal de La Cisterna; Referee: Roberto Tobar |

| 23 July 2017 | Deportes Antofagasta | 1–1 (2–1 agg.) | Cobreloa | Antofagasta |
| 16:00 | Ciampichetti 37' | Report | Simón 40' | Stadium: Estadio Regional Calvo y Bascuñán; Attendance: 3,000; Referee: Felipe González |

| 2 August 2017 | Santiago Morning | 0–3 (3–4 agg.) | O'Higgins | La Pintana, Santiago |
| 15:30 | | Report | Rolle 14'; Fontanini 38'; Calandria 41' | Stadium: Municipal de La Pintana; Attendance: 552; Referee: Eduardo Gamboa |

| 2 August 2017 | Colo-Colo | 4–0 (5–4 agg.) | Deportes La Serena | Macul, Santiago |
| 20:00 | Suazo 45'; E. Paredes 50', 79'; Valdés 71' | Report | | Stadium: Estadio Monumental; Attendance: 15,274; Referee: Patricio Polic |
Note: The match was originally scheduled for 15 July 2017, but was postponed due to a snow storm that affected the cities of Santiago and Rancagua.

| 9 August 2017 | Universidad Católica | 3–1 (4–1 agg.) | Rangers | Las Condes, Santiago |
| 20:00 | Espinosa 36', 51'; Buonanotte 39' | Report | García 26' | Stadium: Estadio San Carlos de Apoquindo; Attendance: 4,083; Referee: César Deischler |
Note: The match was originally scheduled for 15 July 2017, but was postponed due to a snow storm that affected the cities of Santiago and Rancagua.

== Bracket ==
Round of 16
15 | Deportes Antofagasta | 4 | 4 | 8
4 | San Marcos de Arica | 0 | 2 | 2
13 | Palestino | 1 | 1 | 2
11 | Curicó Unido | 2 | 2 | 4
14 | Universidad de Chile | 3 | 1 | 4
2 | Audax Italiano | 0 | 0 | 0
10 | Coquimbo Unido | 0 | 1 | 1
9 | San Luis | 3 | 4 | 7
6 | Colo-Colo | 2 | 0 | 2
5 | Iberia | 3 | 2 | 5
7 | Santiago Wanderers | 2 | 2 | 4
3 | O'Higgins | 0 | 0 | 0
16 | Huachipato | 1 | 3 | 4
8 | Universidad Católica | 1 | 2 | 3
12 | Unión San Felipe | 0 | 1 | 1
1 | Deportes Temuco | 0 | 0 | 0

Quarterfinals
15 | Deportes Antofagasta (p) | 1 | 0 | 1 (4)
11 | Curicó Unido | 1 | 0 | 1 (2)
14 | Universidad de Chile | 1 | 2 | 3
9 | San Luis | 0 | 2 | 2
5 | Iberia | 1 | 1 | 2 (3)
7 | Santiago Wanderers (p) | 1 | 1 | 2 (4)
16 | Huachipato | 3 | 1 | 4
12 | Unión San Felipe | 1 | 1 | 2

Semifinals
15 | Deportes Antofagasta | 0 | 1 | 1
14 | Universidad de Chile | 2 | 0 | 2
7 | Santiago Wanderers (p) | 1 | 0 | 1 (5)
16 | Huachipato | 1 | 0 | 1 (3)

Final
14 | Universidad de Chile | 1
7 | Santiago Wanderers | 3

== Round of 16 ==
The draw for the round of 16 (and subsequent phases) was held on 7 July 2017. Starting from this round, the order of legs in each tie will depend on the number assigned to the first round tie won by each team. The team with the highest number in each tie will host the second leg.

| Team 1 | Agg. | Team 2 | 1st leg | 2nd leg |
|---|---|---|---|---|
| San Marcos de Arica | 2–8 | Deportes Antofagasta | 0–4 | 2–4 |
| Curicó Unido | 4–2 | Palestino | 2–1 | 2–1 |
| Audax Italiano | 0–4 | Universidad de Chile | 0–3 | 0–1 |
| San Luis | 7–1 | Coquimbo Unido | 3–0 | 4–1 |
| Iberia | 5–3 | Colo-Colo | 3–2 | 2–0 |
| O'Higgins | 0–4 | Santiago Wanderers | 0–2 | 0–2 |
| Universidad Católica | 3–4 | Huachipato | 1–1 | 2–3 |
| Deportes Temuco | 0–1 | Unión San Felipe | 0–0 | 0–1 |

Notes

1. ANFP awarded a 3–0 win in favour of San Luis after Coquimbo Unido failed to field a U-20 player for at least 45 minutes, as stated in the rules of the tournament. The original result was a 2–2 draw.

=== First leg ===
| 23 August 2017 | Deportes Temuco | 0–0 | Unión San Felipe | Temuco |
| 18:00 | | Report | | Stadium: Estadio Germán Becker; Referee: Cristián Andaur |

| 23 August 2017 | San Luis de Quillota | 3–0; Awarded | Coquimbo Unido | Quillota |
| 19:30 | Cháves 14' (pen.); Martínez 79' | | Reymúndez 45+2'; Torres 57' | Stadium: Estadio Lucio Fariña; Referee: Franco Arrué |

| 23 August 2017 | Universidad Católica | 1–1 | Huachipato | Las Condes, Santiago |
| 20:00 | Vargas 53' | Report | Ortega 90' | Stadium: Estadio San Carlos de Apoquindo; Attendance: 4,064; Referee: Patricio Polic |

| 23 August 2017 | San Marcos de Arica | 0–4 | Deportes Antofagasta | Arica |
| 21:30 | | Report | Corral 23'; Soda 57', 64'; Estigarribia 87' | Stadium: Estadio Carlos Dittborn; Referee: Ángelo Hermosilla |

| 29 August 2017 | Curicó Unido | 2–1 | Palestino | Curicó |
| 20:00 | Rebolledo 84'; F. Silva 90+4' | Report | R. Paredes 8' | Stadium: La Granja; Attendance: 1,814; Referee: Cristian Andaur Bobadilla |

| 30 August 2017 | Audax Italiano | 0–3 | Universidad de Chile | La Florida, Santiago |
| 18:00 | | Report | Díaz 33'; Pinilla 40', 44' | Stadium: Estadio Bicentenario de La Florida; Attendance: 4,874; Referee: Patricio Polic |

| 30 August 2017 | Iberia | 3–2 | Colo-Colo | Concepción |
| 20:30 | Opazo 60'; Jorquera 83'; Delgado 85' | Report | Fierro 50'; Maturana 57' | Stadium: Estadio Ester Roa; Attendance: 12,210; Referee: Francisco Gilabert |

| 31 August 2017 | O'Higgins | 0–2 | Santiago Wanderers | Rancagua |
| 16:30 | | Report | E. Gutiérrez 2'; Saldías 45+2' | Stadium: Estadio El Teniente; Attendance: 2,380; Referee: Jorge Osorio |

=== Second leg ===
| 30 August 2017 | Unión San Felipe | 1–0 (1–0 agg.) | Deportes Temuco | San Felipe |
| 16:00 | Orellana 22' | Report | | Stadium: Estadio Municipal de San Felipe; Attendance: 671; Referee: Julio Bascuñán |

| 1 September 2017 | Coquimbo Unido | 1–4 (1–7 agg.) | San Luis de Quillota | Coquimbo |
| 20:00 | Melivilú 78' | Report | Caballero 26' (pen.), 57'; Martínez 49'; Lara 84' | Stadium: Francisco Sánchez Rumoroso; Attendance: 2,630; Referee: Ángelo Hermosilla |

| 2 September 2017 | Palestino | 1–2 (2–4 agg.) | Curicó Unido | La Cisterna, Santiago |
| 12:00 | R. Gutiérrez 3' | Report | Vargas 32'; J. Silva 90' | Stadium: Estadio Municipal de La Cisterna; Referee: Julio Bascuñán |

| 2 September 2017 | Universidad de Chile | 1–0 (4–0 agg.) | Audax Italiano | Ñuñoa, Santiago |
| 19:00 | Díaz 5' | Report | | Stadium: Estadio Nacional; Attendance: 23,098; Referee: Piero Maza |

| 3 September 2017 | Colo-Colo | 0–2 (2–5 agg.) | Iberia | Macul, Santiago |
| 17:00 | | Report | Baeza 5', 66' | Stadium: Estadio Monumental; Attendance: 12,477; Referee: Patricio Polic |

| 3 September 2017 | Santiago Wanderers | 2–0 (4–0 agg.) | O'Higgins | Valparaíso |
| 20:00 | Luna 38'; Pavez 90+1' | Report | | Stadium: Estadio Elías Figueroa Brander; Referee: César Deischler |

| 6 September 2017 | Deportes Antofagasta | 4–2 (8–2 agg.) | San Marcos de Arica | Antofagasta |
| 19:45 | Magalhães 10', 27'; L. Valenzuela 25'; Flores 37' | Report | Pozo 7'; Gaete 58' | Stadium: Estadio Regional Calvo y Bascuñan; Referee: Felipe González |

| 6 September 2017 | Huachipato | 3–2 (4–3 agg.) | Universidad Católica | Talcahuano |
| 20:00 | Soteldo 14', 68'; Ortega 81' | Report | Buonanotte 58'; Álvarez 90+1' | Stadium: Estadio CAP; Referee: Julio Bascuñán |

== Quarterfinals ==
The schedule was released on 7 September. Matches were played from 13 September to 9 October.

| Team 1 | Agg. | Team 2 | 1st leg | 2nd leg |
|---|---|---|---|---|
| Curicó Unido | 1–1 (2–4 p) | Deportes Antofagasta | 1–1 | 0–0 |
| San Luis | 2–3 | Universidad de Chile | 0–1 | 2–2 |
| Iberia | 2–2 (3–4 p) | Santiago Wanderers | 1–1 | 1–1 |
| Unión San Felipe | 2–4 | Huachipato | 1–3 | 1–1 |

=== First leg ===
| 13 September 2017 | Curicó Unido | 1–1 | Deportes Antofagasta | Curicó |
| 17:30 | Tello 63' | Report | Corral 90+1' | Stadium: Estadio La Granja; Attendance: 2,000; Referee: Franco Arrué |

| 13 September 2017 | Unión San Felipe | 1–3 | Huachipato | San Felipe |
| 20:00 | Pío 36' | Report | Córdova 47'; Soteldo 64'; Ortega 67' | Stadium: Estadio Municipal; Referee: Héctor Jona |

| 14 September 2017 | San Luis de Quillota | 0–1 | Universidad de Chile | Quillota |
| 17:30 | | Report | Monzón 29' | Stadium: Estadio Lucio Fariña; Attendance: 3,370; Referee: Eduardo Gamboa |

| 14 September 2017 | Iberia | 1–1 | Santiago Wanderers | Los Ángeles |
| 20:00 | Gómez 55' | Report | E. Gutiérrez 90' | Stadium: Estadio Municipal; Attendance: 2,651; Referee: Cristián Andaur |

=== Second leg ===
| 27 September 2017 | Santiago Wanderers | 1–1 (2–2 agg.) (4–3 p) | Iberia | Valparaíso |
| 18:00 | Pineda 46' | Report | Pardo 56' | Stadium: Estadio Elías Figueroa; Attendance: 4,893; Referee: Ángelo Hermosilla |
| | Penalties |
| | E. Gutiérrez (penalty scored); Robles (penalty missed); Pineda (penalty scored); Medel (penalty scored); C. Cortés (penalty scored) | | (penalty scored) S. Silva; (penalty scored) Baeza; (penalty scored) J. Gutiérrez; (penalty missed) Delgado; (penalty missed) D. González |

| 27 September 2017 | Huachipato | 1–1 (4–2 agg.) | Unión San Felipe | Talcahuano |
| 21:00 | Ortega 69' | Report | Ri. González 48' | Stadium: Estadio CAP; Attendance: 5,000; Referee: Cristián Andaur |

| 8 October 2017 | Deportes Antofagasta | 0–0 (1–1 agg.) (4–2 p) | Curicó Unido | Antofagasta |
| 16:00 | | Report | | Stadium: Estadio Regional Calvo y Bascuñán; Attendance: 3,066; Referee: Piero Maza |
| | Penalties |
| | L. Valenzuela (penalty scored); Ciampichetti (penalty scored); B. Romo (penalty scored); Corral (penalty scored) | | (penalty missed) Rebolledo; (penalty scored) Alvarado; (penalty missed) Gauna; (penalty scored) Zúñiga |

| 9 October 2017 | Universidad de Chile | 2–2 (3–2 agg.) | San Luis de Quillota | Ñuñoa, Santiago |
| 17:00 | Ubilla 42'; Guerra 47' | Report | Ro. González 84'; Bravo 90+1' | Stadium: Estadio Nacional; Attendance: 28,098; Referee: César Deischler |

== Semifinals ==
Matches were played from 18 to 25 October.

| Team 1 | Agg. | Team 2 | 1st leg | 2nd leg |
|---|---|---|---|---|
| Universidad de Chile | 2–1 | Deportes Antofagasta | 2–0 | 0–1 |
| Santiago Wanderers | 1–1 (5–3 p) | Huachipato | 1–1 | 0–0 |

=== First leg ===
| 18 October 2017 | Santiago Wanderers | 1–1 | Huachipato | Valparaíso |
| 18:00 | López 28' | Report | Ortega 50' | Stadium: Estadio Elías Figueroa; Attendance: 4,595; Referee: Eduardo Gamboa |

| 18 October 2017 | Universidad de Chile | 2–0 | Deportes Antofagasta | Ñuñoa, Santiago |
| 21:00 | M. Rodríguez 13'; Guerra 45+4' | Report | | Stadium: Estadio Nacional; Attendance: 22,207; Referee: Patricio Polic |

=== Second leg ===
| 25 October 2017 | Huachipato | 0–0 (1–1 agg.) (3–5 p) | Santiago Wanderers | Talcahuano |
| 18:00 | | Report | | Stadium: Estadio CAP; Attendance: 3,477; Referee: Jorge Osorio |
| | Penalties |
| | Povea (penalty scored); Ortega (penalty scored); Sepúlveda (penalty scored); Zoch (penalty missed) | | (penalty scored) E. Gutiérrez; (penalty scored) Pineda; (penalty scored) Medel; (penalty scored) Castellón; (penalty scored) C. Cortés |

| 25 October 2017 | Deportes Antofagasta | 1–0 (1–2 agg.) | Universidad de Chile | Antofagasta |
| 21:15 | Corral 87' (pen.) | Report | | Stadium: Estadio Regional Calvo y Bascuñán; Attendance: 6,824; Referee: Julio Bascuñán |

== Final ==
On 26 October 2017, the ANFP announced that the Copa Chile Final would be played on 11 November 2017 in Concepción.

11 November 2017
17:00

| Universidad de Chile | 1–3 | Santiago Wanderers |
|---|---|---|
| Pizarro 73' | Report | E. Gutiérrez 34', 71' (pen.); Pineda 51' |

Estadio Ester Roa, Concepción
Attendance: 24,246
Referee: Eduardo Gamboa

== Top goalscorers ==
| Pos | Player | Club | Goals |
|---|---|---|---|
| 1 | (Paraguay) Jorge Ortega | Huachipato | 6 |
| 2 | (Argentina) Enzo Gutiérrez | Santiago Wanderers | 5 |
| 3 | (Venezuela) Yeferson Soteldo | Huachipato | 4 |
