= Diego González =

Diego González may refer to:

== Association football ==
- Diego González (footballer, born 1986) (Diego Armando González Vega), Chilean football forward
- Diego González (footballer, born 1988) (Diego Hernán González), Argentine football midfielder
- Diego González (footballer, born 1991) (Diego Ignacio González Reyes), Chilean football midfielder
- Diego González (footballer, born January 1995) (Diego González Polanco), Spanish footballer
- Diego González (footballer, born July 1995) (Diego Antonio González Morales), Mexican football midfielder
- Diego González (footballer, born November 1995) (Diego Ignacio González Fuentes), Chilean former football midfielder
- Diego González (footballer, born 1997) (Diego Alexis González Miranda), Uruguayan football forward
- Diego González (footballer, born April 1998) (Diego Abraham González Torres), Chilean football defender
- Diego González (footballer, born August 1998) (Diego Humberto González Saavedra), Chilean football midfielder
- Diego González (footballer, born 1999) (Diego González Cabanes), Spanish football defender
- Diego González (footballer, born 2001) (Diego Armando González Salinas), Chilean football forward with Deportes Iberia
- Diego Gonzalez (soccer), American soccer midfielder
- Diego González (footballer, born 2003) (Diego Luis González Alcaraz), Paraguayan football forward
- Diego González (goalkeeper, born 2003) (Diego Fabián González), argentinan goalkeeper

== Other ==
- Diego González (actor) (Diego González Boneta, born 1990), Mexican singer and actor
- Diego González (bishop) (died 1587), Spanish Roman Catholic bishop
- Diego González (sailor) (born 1987), Chilean sailor
- Diego González-Aguilera (born 1976), Spanish academic
- Diego González Holguín (1560–1620), Spanish Jesuit priest
- Diego González Montero Justiniano (fl. 1662–1670), interim Royal Governor of Chile
- Diego González Samaniego (died 1611), Roman Catholic bishop
- Diego Tadeo González (1733–1794), Spanish poet
