= Héctor Águila =

Chilean footballer

Personal information
- Full name: Héctor Daniel Águila Serpa
- Date of birth: 21 July 1979 (age 47)
- Place of birth: Castro, Chile
- Positions: Defensive midfielder; striker

Senior career*
Years	Team	Apps	(Gls)
1997	Huachipato	1	(0)
1998–1999	Universidad Católica		
2000–2001	Ñublense		
2002	Malleco Unido	–	(–)
2002	Provincial Osorno		
2002–2003	Castro (city team)		
2003–2008	Deportes Puerto Montt	159	(11)
2008	→ Coatzacoalcos (loan)	8	(0)
2009	Deportes Concepción	9	(0)

Managerial career
- Colo-Colo (youth)
- 2013: Castro (city team)
- 2017–2020: Deportes Puerto Montt (youth)
- 2020–2021: Castro U15 (city team)
- * Club domestic league appearances and goals

Héctor Daniel Águila Serpa (born 21 July 1979) is a Chilean former footballer who played as a defensive midfielder for clubs in Chile and Mexico.

== Playing career ==
A player from Castro, Chile, in his early years as a professional footballer, Águla took part of Huachipato, Universidad Católica and Ñublense before playing for Malleco Unido in the Chilean Tercera División, standing out as a goalscorer.

After a brief step with Provincial Osorno, and taking part of a national amateur championship with the Castro city team, he joined Deportes Puerto Montt in 2003 thanks to Gino Valentini, becoming a historical player of the club, after leaving them at the end of the 2008 season.

Abroad, he played for Mexican side Tiburones Rojos de Coatzacoalcos in 2008, thanks to his friend Héctor Mancilla, ending his career with Deportes Concepción the next year in the Primera B de Chile.

== Coaching career ==
Águila graduated as a football manager in 2013. He has worked for the Colo-Colo youth system by leading an academy in his city of birth, Castro. On 9 July 2017 it was announced he became the coach of the Deportes Puerto Montt's U19 and U17 squads after he had previously been unemployed in Chonchi after working with minor teams.

At the same time, he has coached the Castro city team in 2013 and at under-15 level in both 2020 and 2021 for the national championships. He was discussed as being a potential candidate for technical director of Deportes Puerto Montt in 2021, which plays in the second division.

== Personal life ==
Due to his origin, he is nicknamed El Chilote.
