= Mario Pardo =

Mario Pardo may refer to:

- Mario Pardo (footballer)
- Mario Pardo (actor)
- Mario Pardo (wrestler)
