= Nicolás Guerra =

Chilean footballer (born 1999)

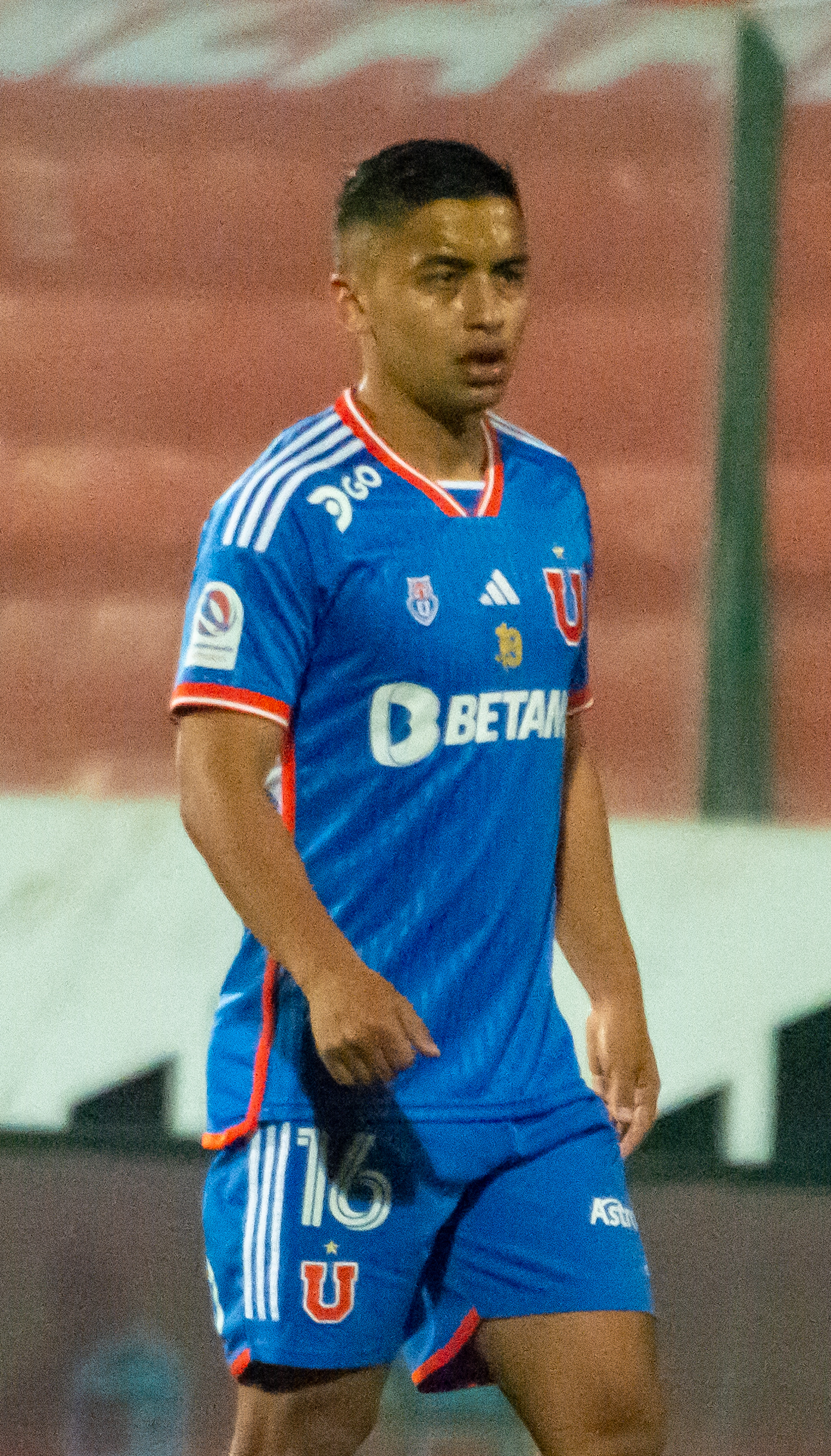
- Guerra with Universidad de Chile in 2023

Personal information
- Full name: Nicolás Bastián Guerra Ruz
- Date of birth: 9 January 1999 (age 27)
- Place of birth: Santiago, Chile
- Height: 1.74 m (5 ft 9 in)
- Position: Forward

Team information
- Current team: Instituto
- Number: 7

Youth career
- Cobreloa
- 2014–2017: Universidad de Chile

Senior career*
| Years | Team | Apps | (Gls) |
| 2017–2021 | Universidad de Chile | 71 | (8) |
| 2021 | → Ñublense (loan) | 31 | (11) |
| 2022 | Ñublense | 23 | (8) |
| 2023–2026 | Universidad de Chile | 63 | (14) |
| 2026– | Instituto | 13 | (1) |

International career^{‡}
| 2018 | Chile U20 | 5 | (1) |
| 2019 | Chile U23 | 7 | (0) |
| 2025– | Chile | 1 | (3) |
Medal record
Men's football
Representing Chile
South American Games
| Gold medal – first place | 2018 Cochabamba |
- * Club domestic league appearances and goals as of 18:02, 10 May 2026 (UTC) ‡ National team caps and goals as of 18 March 2025

Nicolás Bastián Guerra Ruz (born 9 January 1999) is a Chilean professional footballer who plays as a forward for Argentine club Instituto.

== Club career ==
Guerra made his professional debut in a 2017 Copa Chile match against Ñublense, by replacing Leandro Benegas. In the same tournament, he scored his first goal in a match against San Luis de Quillota. Later, he signed his first contract as professional player on 27 December 2017.

On 2021 season, Guerra joined Ñublense on loan from Universidad de Chile.

Back to Universidad de Chile from Ñublense in 2023, Guerra left them at the end of the 2025 season.

In January 2026, Guerra moved abroad and signed with Argentine club Instituto.

== International career ==
At under-20 level, Guerra represented Chile in the 2018 South American Games, winning the gold medal.

Guerra represented Chile U23 at the 2019 Maurice Revello Tournament and the 2020 Pre-Olympic Tournament. In both championships, Chile did not qualify for the second stage. Also, he played in a friendly match against Brazil U23

In September 2020, Guerra was called up to a training microcycle of the Chile senior team. He received his first call-up for the friendly against Panama on 8 February 2025. He made his debut as a starting player and got a hat-trick.

== Career statistics ==
=== Club ===
As of 10 February 2021

| Club | Season | League | | | Cup | | Continental | | Other | | Total | |
| Club | Season | Division | Apps | Goals | Apps | Goals | Apps | Goals | Apps | Goals | Apps | Goals |
|---|---|---|---|---|---|---|---|---|---|---|---|---|
| Universidad de Chile | 2017 | Primera; División | 4 | 0 | 5 | 2 | 0 | 0 | 0 | 0 | 9 | 2 |
| Universidad de Chile | 2018 | Primera; División | 24 | 4 | 7 | 1 | 5 | 0 | 0 | 0 | 36 | 5 |
| Universidad de Chile | 2019 | Primera; División | 19 | 1 | 2 | 2 | 0 | 0 | 0 | 0 | 21 | 3 |
| Universidad de Chile | 2020 | Primera; División | 24 | 3 | — | | 1 | 0 | 0 | 0 | 22 | 3 |
| Universidad de Chile | Total | | 71 | 8 | 14 (Note: Appearances in the Copa Chile) | 5 | 6 (Note: Appearances in the Copa Libertadores) | 0 | 0 | 0 | 91 | 13 |
| Ñublense (loan) | 2021 | Primera; División | 0 | 0 | 0 | 0 | — | | 0 | 0 | 0 | 0 |
| Career total | | | 71 | 8 | 14 | 5 | 6 | 0 | 0 | 0 | 91 | 13 |

=== International ===
As of match played 8 February 2025

Appearances and goals by national team and year
| National team | Year | Apps | Goals |
|---|---|---|---|
| Chile | 2025 | 1 | 3 |
| Total | | 1 | 3 |

List of international goals scored by Nicolás Guerra
| No. | Date | Venue | Opponent | Score | Result | Competition |
|---|---|---|---|---|---|---|
| 1 | 8 February 2025 | Estadio Nacional Julio Martínez Prádanos, Chile | Panama | 1–0 | 6–1 | Friendly |
| 2 | 8 February 2025 | Estadio Nacional Julio Martínez Prádanos, Chile | Panama | 3–0 | 6–1 | Friendly |
| 3 | 8 February 2025 | Estadio Nacional Julio Martínez Prádanos, Chile | Panama | 4–1 | 6–1 | Friendly |

== Honours ==
Chile U20

- South American Games Gold medal: 2018
