= Braulio Baeza (footballer) =

Chilean footballer (born 1990)

Personal information
- Full name: Braulio Esteban Baeza Figueroa
- Date of birth: 1 July 1990 (age 36)
- Place of birth: Rancagua, Chile
- Height: 1.79 m (5 ft 10 1/2 in)
- Position: Midfielder

Senior career*
Years	Team	Apps	(Gls)
2008–2009	O'Higgins	17	(1)
2010–2011	→ U. Temuco (loan)	43	(4)
2012	→ Puerto Montt (loan)	19	(2)
2013–2015	→ Copiapó (loan)	35	(0)
2015–2017	Curicó Unido	17	(0)
2017	Iberia	14	(0)
2018–2019	Puerto Montt	39	(1)
- * Club domestic league appearances and goals as of 29 March 2020

Braulio Esteban Baeza Figueroa (born 1 July 1990) is a Chilean footballer.
