= Mario López (footballer) =

Paraguayan footballer (born 1995)

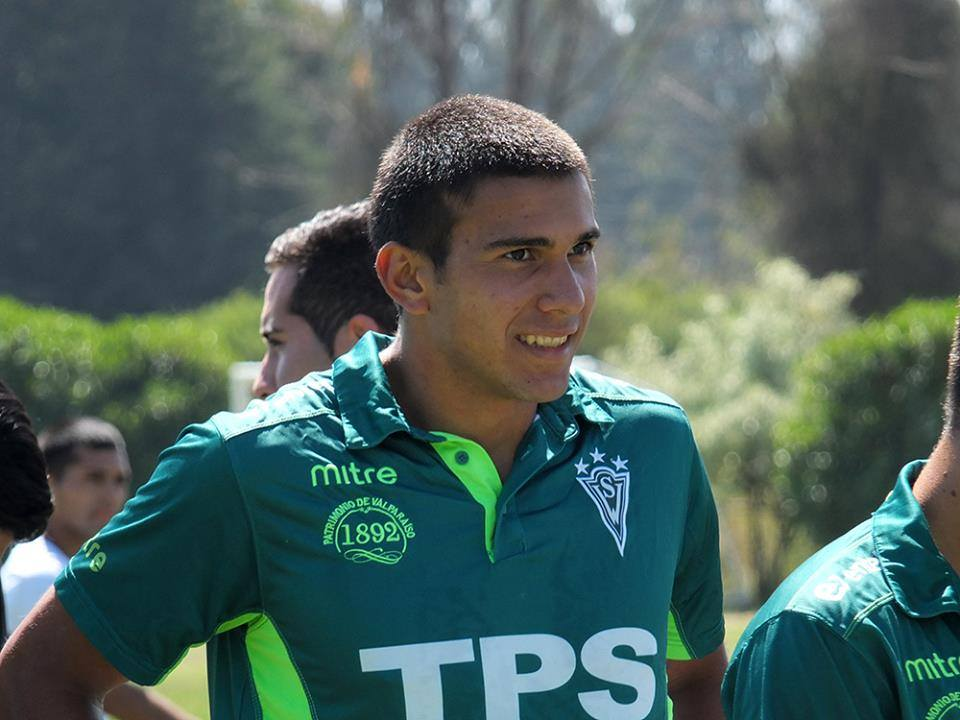
- López with Santiago Wanderers in 2014

Personal information
- Full name: Mario Ernesto López Quintana
- Date of birth: 6 July 1995 (age 31)
- Place of birth: Mariano Roque Alonso, Paraguay
- Height: 1.82 m (6 ft 0 in)
- Position: Defender

Team information
- Current team: Deportes Iquique

Youth career
- 2007: Cerro Corá
- 2007: Valois Rivarola
- 2008–2011: Cerro Porteño
- 2012–2014: Gimnasia LP
- 2014: Santiago Wanderers

Senior career*
Years	Team	Apps	(Gls)
2014–2019	Santiago Wanderers	116	(3)
2020–2022	Aldosivi	52	(1)
2023	Quilmes	24	(0)
2024–2025	Guaraní	65	(0)
2026	Sportivo San Lorenzo	13	(0)
2026–	Deportes Iquique	0	(0)
- * Club domestic league appearances and goals as of 14 July 2025

Mario Ernesto López Quintana (born 6 July 1995) is a Paraguayan footballer who plays for Deportes Iquique.

== Club career ==
After starting playing for hometown teams (Cerro Corá and Valois Rivarola) he joined Cerro Porteño football academy in 2008. After spending three years at Asunción-based side, López moved to Argentina for play at Gimnasia y Esgrima La Plata youth set-up.

In the winter of 2014, López joined Primera División de Chile side Santiago Wanderers and made his professional debut against San Marcos de Arica coming on as a substitute after replacing Jorge Luna. His first competitive goal came on 21 March 2015 in a 3–3 away draw with the same San Marcos de Arica, now at the Estadio Carlos Dittborn.

On 10 January 2020, López signed with Argentine club Aldosivi.

In January 2026, López signed with Sportivo San Lorenzo. He returned to Chile and joined Deportes Iquique for the second half of the year.

== Personal life ==
López naturalized Chilean by residence.

== Honours ==
Santiago Wanderers

- Primera B de Chile: 2019
- Copa Chile: 2017
