= Pablo Corral =

Chilean footballer (born 1992)

Personal information
- Full name: Pablo Ignacio Corral Mondaca
- Date of birth: 16 January 1992 (age 34)
- Place of birth: Ovalle, Chile
- Height: 1.71 m (5 ft 7 in)
- Position: Midfielder

Youth career
- 2005–2010: Universidad Católica

Senior career*
Years	Team	Apps	(Gls)
2011–2015	Universidad Católica	1	(0)
2012	→ Deportes La Serena (loan)	5	(0)
2013	→ Deportes Puerto Montt (loan)	3	(0)
2013–2014	→ Naval (loan)	25	(1)
2014–2015	→ Deportes Puerto Montt (loan)	30	(6)
2015–2016	San Marcos	23	(5)
2016–2017	Deportes Antofagasta	20	(2)
2018–2019	Deportes Iquique	13	(1)
2020–2022	Curicó Unido	26	(0)
2022–2023	Santiago Wanderers	23	(0)
2024	Trasandino	12	(0)
Total		181	(15)
- * Club domestic league appearances and goals

Pablo Ignacio Corral Mondaca (born January 16, 1992) is a Chilean former footballer who played as a midfielder.

== Career ==
As a member of Universidad Católica, Corral won the 2011 Copa Chile.

In 2024, Corral signed with Trasandino in the Segunda División Profesional de Chile. He retired at the end of the season.

== Post-retirement ==
In March 2025, Corral assumed as sport manager of Trasandino.

== Honours ==
Universidad Católica

- Copa Chile: 2011

Deportes Puerto Montt

- Segunda División Profesional: 2014–15
