= Jean Paul Pineda =

Chilean footballer (born 1989)

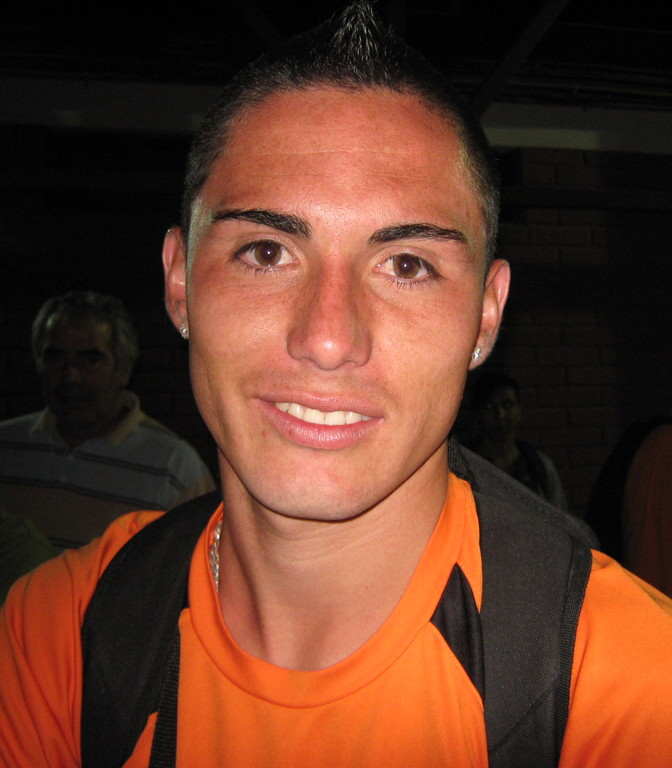
- Pineda with Cobreloa in 2011

Personal information
- Full name: Jean Paul Jesús Pineda Cortés
- Date of birth: 24 February 1989 (age 37)
- Place of birth: Santiago, Chile
- Height: 1.78 m (5 ft 10 in)
- Position: Striker

Youth career
- 2001–2006: Palestino

Senior career*
Years	Team	Apps	(Gls)
2006–2009	Palestino	40	(4)
2010	Cobresal	32	(11)
2011	Cobreloa	17	(5)
2011–2012	Unión Española	28	(6)
2012	Unión Española B	1	(2)
2012	Colo-Colo	8	(0)
2013	Cobresal	19	(4)
2014	Rangers	13	(2)
2014–2015	Unión La Calera	35	(17)
2015–2016	Córdoba	22	(1)
2017	Vitória	11	(3)
2017	Santiago Wanderers	14	(7)
2018	Universidad de Concepción	19	(4)
2019	Coquimbo Unido	12	(3)
2019	Atlético Bucaramanga	14	(3)
2020	San Luis	11	(1)
2021	Curicó Unido	7	(0)
2022	Unión San Felipe	19	(8)
2023	Deportes Recoleta	9	(1)
2023	Deportes Melipilla	7	(1)
2024	Real San Joaquín	8	(2)
2025	Real San Joaquín	0	(0)
2026	Deportes Melipilla	–	(–)
Total		346	(85)

International career
2007	Chile U20	5	(0)
2007	Chile	1	(0)
- * Club domestic league appearances and goals

Jean Paul Jesús Pineda Cortés (born 24 February 1989) is a Chilean former professional footballer who played as a forward.

== Club career ==
Born in Santiago, Pineda joined CD Palestino's youth setup at the age of 12. As a youth player of the club, in 2005 he took part of the reality TV show Adidas Selection Team from Fox Sports Chile, where a squad made up by youth players from professional teams faced players from schools, standing out future professional footballers such as Felipe Seymour, Nelson Saavedra, Eduardo Vargas, among others. He made his senior debut in 2006. In December 2009 he moved to Cobresal. He finished as the club's top scorer that season with 11 goals.

On 22 December 2010 Pineda joined Cobreloa, but signed for Unión Española on 16 July of the following year. On 25 January 2013 he returned to Cobresal, after having a short spell at Colo Colo.

On 10 January 2014 Pineda signed for Rangers de Talca. On 25 May, after appearing regularly, he moved to Unión La Calera, scoring a career-best 17 goals for the latter during the 2014–15 campaign.

On 11 July 2015 Pineda moved abroad for the first time in his career, after agreeing to a two-year contract with Spanish Segunda División side Córdoba CF. On 30 August of the following year, he terminated his contract with the club.

In January 2017, Pineda signed with Brazilian club EC Vitória.

In July 2023, he joined Deportes Melipilla in the Segunda División Profesional de Chile from Deportes Recoleta.

In March 2024, he joined Real San Joaquín. In July of the same year, he announced his retirement from football.

After a year in Spain, Pineda returned to Chile and rejoined Real San Joaquín in July 2025.

In September 2026, Pineda joined Deportes Melipilla for the 2026 Campeonato FENAFUR.

== International career ==
After previously representing Chile in the under-20 level, Pineda made his debut with the main squad on 16 May 2007, starting in a 2–0 win against Cuba.

== Personal life ==
Pineda married the Chilean model Faloon Larraguibel in 2019 and they have three children.

After announcing his retirement in July 2024, Pineda moved to Spain and later returned to Chile in July 2025; during his time abroad he worked in rural employment.

=== Legal issues ===
On 8 March 2024, police arrested Pineda following a domestic-violence complaint made by his then-partner, Faloon Larraguibel. He was later charged with threats and minor injuries in the context of an alleged domestic incident.

In February 2025, Pineda was arrested after a drunk-driving incident in La Pintana in which he crashed into another vehicle.

On 1 October 2025, Pineda was arrested in La Florida following a reported domestic incident involving his partner, Valentina Castro.

In April 2026, Pineda was placed under nighttime house arrest for failing to pay his ex-wife alimony.

On 18 October 2026, Pineda was arrested in San Bernardo following a reported incident in a motel involving an ex-partner.

== Honours ==
Vitória

- Campeonato Baiano: 2017

Santiago Wanderers

- Copa Chile: 2017
