= Miguel Orellana =

Chilean footballer (born 1989)

Personal information
- Full name: Miguel Ángel Orellana Arce
- Date of birth: 29 December 1989 (age 36)
- Place of birth: Renca, Santiago, Chile
- Height: 1.66 m (5 ft 5 in)
- Position: Forward

Youth career
- Unión Española

Senior career*
Years	Team	Apps	(Gls)
2008–2009	Unión Española	14	(1)
2009	Provincial Osorno	20	(18)
2010–2014	Audax Italiano	12	(0)
2011	→ Unión Temuco (loan)	19	(4)
2012	→ Ñublense (loan)	29	(4)
2013	→ Lota Schwager (loan)	9	(0)
2013–2014	→ Iberia (loan)	21	(21)
2014–2015	Iberia	37	(15)
2015–2017	Rangers	50	(13)
2017–2019	Unión San Felipe	28	(5)
2018	→ Barnechea (loan)	28	(12)
2020	Santiago Morning	13	(2)
2021	Magallanes	25	(9)
2022	Deportes Puerto Montt	11	(1)
2022–2023	Iberia	33	(7)
2024–2025	Provincial Osorno	41	(16)
Total		390	(128)
- * Club domestic league appearances and goals

Miguel Ángel Orellana Arce (born 29 December 1989) is a Chilean former footballer who played as a forward.

== Career ==
Born in Renca commune, Santiago de Chile, Orellana is a product of Unión Española.

After spending two seasons with Provincial Osorno, Orellana announced his retirement in February 2026.

== Honours ==
Iberia

- Segunda División Profesional: 2013-14

Individual

- Segunda División Profesional Top Goalscorer: 2013-14
