= Allan Luttecke =

Chilean footballer (born 1993)

Personal information
- Full name: Allan Andreas Luttecke Rascovky
- Date of birth: 31 January 1993 (age 33)
- Place of birth: Santiago, Chile
- Height: 1.70 m (5 ft 7 in)
- Position: Striker

Youth career
- 2004–2013: Universidad Católica

Senior career*
| Years | Team | Apps | (Gls) |
| 2011–2015 | Universidad Católica | 1 | (0) |
| 2014 | → Coquimbo Unido (loan) | 4 | (0) |
| 2015–2016 | Unión La Calera | 5 | (0) |
| 2016–2019 | Barnechea | 65 | (10) |
| Total | | 75 | (10) |
- * Club domestic league appearances and goals

Allan Andreas Luttecke Rascovky (born 31 January 1993) is a Chilean former professional footballer who played as a striker.

== Personal life ==
Luttecke is of German descent.

After retiring from professional football in January 2020, Luttecke began training to become a commercial pilot.
