= Francisco Silva (footballer, born April 1983) =

Uruguayan footballer

Personal information
- Full name: Francisco Ronaldo Silva Fernández
- Date of birth: 26 April 1983 (age 43)
- Place of birth: Montevideo, Uruguay
- Height: 1.83 m (6 ft 0 in)
- Position: Midfielder

Senior career*
Years	Team	Apps	(Gls)
2003–2009	Central Español	88	(7)
2009	Liverpool	2	(0)
2010	Cobreloa	21	(2)
2011–2015	Everton	84	(7)
2014	→ San Marcos (loan)	31	(2)
2015–2018	Curicó Unido	73	(3)
2019–2020	Rangers	47	(0)
- * Club domestic league appearances and goals as of 18:54, 2 March 2021 (UTC9

Francisco Ronaldo Silva Fernández (born 26 April 1983) is a Uruguayan footballer who last played for Primera B de Chile side Rangers.

== Personal life ==
In January 2018, he naturalized Chilean by residence.

== Honors ==
=== Club ===
San Marcos

- Primera B de Chile (1): 2013–14

Curicó Unido

- Primera B de Chile (1): 2016–17
