= Diego González-Aguilera =

Spanish engineer

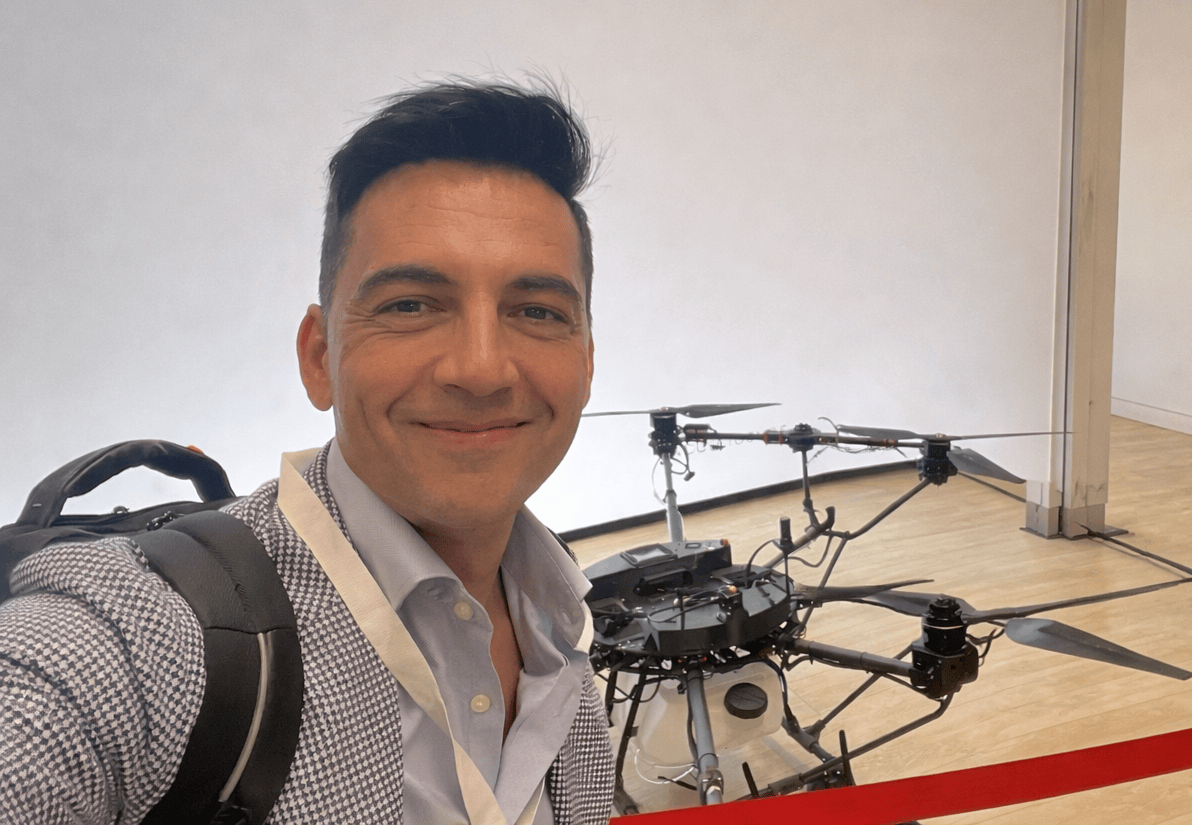
- Occupations: Geodesy and cartography engineer and an academic

Academic background
- Education: BSc., Surveying Engineering; BSc., Geodesy and Cartography Engineering; Ph.D., Photogrammetry and Computer Vision
- Alma mater: University of Salamanca

Diego González-Aguilera (April 9, 1976, Avila, Spain) is a full professor of the University of Salamanca (Spain), as well as the head of the Department of Cartographic and Land Engineering at the same university and president of the International Center for Geospatial Industry and GeoInformatics.

González-Aguilera's research has focused on democratization and popularization of photogrammetry, computer vision, and geospatial intelligence in different fields and domains of engineering, including security and health applications. He received the 2015 Royal Academy of Engineering award for his contributions in the field of cartography and geodesy, specifically in computer vision, photogrammetry, and 3D reconstruction from images.

== Education ==
González-Aguilera received his education at the University of Salamanca, completing his Bachelor's in Surveying Engineering in 1999 and Geodesy and Cartographic Engineering in 2001. Afterwards, he completed a Ph.D. in Photogrammetry and Computer Vision in 2005.

== Career ==
González-Aguilera has held academic, administrative, and professional appointments throughout his career. He has been a full professor at the University of Salamanca since 2017. He is also the director of the Department of Cartographic and Land Engineering at the Higher Polytechnic School of Ávila and the PhD Program in Geotechnologies at the University of Salamanca.

González-Aguilera is the editor-in-chief of the journal Drones, which he founded in 2017. He also developed Sv3DVISION, a software focusing on 3D reconstruction and dimensional analysis from a single view. Moreover, he is the founder and president of the GEOCENTER Technology Center. He is also the head of the TIDOP research group, and of ITOS3D Engineering, a USAL spin-off founded in 2014.

== Research ==
González-Aguilera's work has primarily focused on photogrammetry and computer vision. In the security field, he ran energy analyses for the necessary expert reports and the reconstruction of road accidents, especially those with serious damage and consequences. He also utilized geospatial techniques to quickly and efficiently allow for the reconstruction of crime scenes using 3D point cloud data. Together with his colleagues, he demonstrated the potential of geospatial platforms for tackling issues such as wildfires and water quantity management. He also developed a macroscopic method for assessing the quality of welds.

== Awards and honors ==
- 2006 – Bronze, International Society for Photogrammetry and Remote Sensing (ISPRS) Award
- 2010 – Technology Transfer Award, The regional government of Castilla y León
- 2012 – Silver, International Society for Photogrammetry and Remote Sensing (ISPRS) Award
- 2013 – National Research Award, Spanish Police Foundation.
- 2014 – International AppCampus Microsoft Award, AppCampus
- 2015 – Royal Academy of Spain Engineering Award

== Selected articles ==
- González-Aguilera, D.; Rodriguez-Gonzalvez, P.; Armesto, J.; Lagüela, S. (2012). "Novel approach to 3D thermography and energy efficiency evaluation". Energy and Buildings. 54: 436–443. Bibcode:2012EneBu..54..436G. doi:10.1016/j.enbuild.2012.07.023.
- González-Aguilera, D.; Lagüela, S.; Rodríguez-Gonzálvez, P.; Hernández-López, D. (2013). "Image-based thermographic modeling for assessing energy efficiency of buildings façades". Energy and Buildings. 65: 29–36. Bibcode:2013EneBu..65...29G. doi:10.1016/j.enbuild.2013.05.040.
- Holgado-Barco, Alberto; González-Aguilera, Diego; Arias-Sanchez, Pedro; Martinez-Sanchez, Joaquin (2015). "Semiautomatic Extraction of Road Horizontal Alignment from a Mobile LiDAR System". Computer-Aided Civil and Infrastructure Engineering. 30 (3): 217–228. doi:10.1111/mice.12087.
- Zancajo-Blazquez, Sandra; Laguela-Lopez, Susana; Gonzalez-Aguilera, Diego; Martinez-Sanchez, Joaquin (2015). "Segmentation of Indoor Mapping Point Clouds Applied to Crime Scenes Reconstruction". IEEE Transactions on Information Forensics and Security. 10 (7): 1350–1358. Bibcode:2015ITIF...10.1350Z. doi:10.1109/TIFS.2015.2407699.
- Morales, Alejandro; Gonzalez-Aguilera, Diego; Gutiérrez, Miguel; López, Alfonso (2015). "Energy Analysis of Road Accidents Based on Close-Range Photogrammetry". Remote Sensing. 7 (11): 15161–15178. Bibcode:2015RemS....715161M. doi:10.3390/rs71115161.
- Holgado-Barco, Alberto; Riveiro, Belén; González-Aguilera, Diego; Arias, Pedro (2017). "Automatic Inventory of Road Cross-Sections from Mobile Laser Scanning System". Computer-Aided Civil and Infrastructure Engineering. 32 (1): 3–17. doi:10.1111/mice.12213.
- Sáez Blázquez, Cristina; Borge-Diez, David; Martín Nieto, Ignacio; Farfán Martín, Arturo; González-Aguilera, Diego (2021). "Multi-parametric evaluation of electrical, biogas and natural gas geothermal source heat pumps". Renewable Energy. 163: 1682–1691. Bibcode:2021REne..163.1682B. doi:10.1016/j.renene.2020.10.080. hdl:10366/169804.
