= Felipe Saavedra =

Chilean footballer (born 1996)

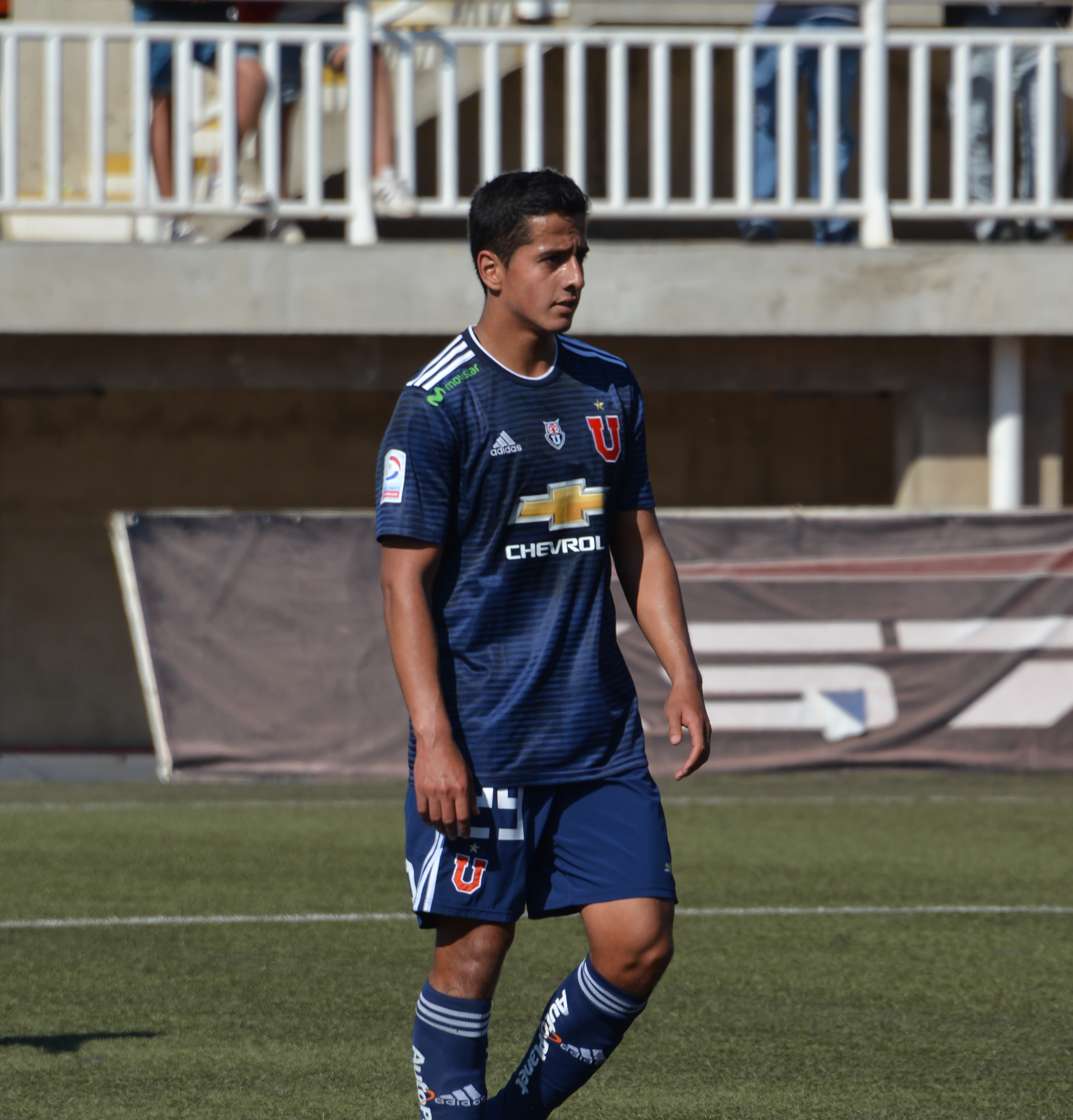
- Saavedra with Universidad de Chile in 2018

Personal information
- Full name: Felipe Ignacio Saavedra Saavedra
- Date of birth: September 26, 1996 (age 30)
- Place of birth: Quillota, Chile
- Height: 1.72 m (5 ft 8 in)
- Position: Left back

Team information
- Current team: Cobreloa

Youth career
- San Luis

Senior career*
Years	Team	Apps	(Gls)
2014–2017	San Luis	25	(1)
2017–2021	Universidad de Chile	3	(1)
2017	→ San Luis (loan)	11	(0)
2019	→ Curicó Unido (loan)	14	(0)
2020	→ Deportes Iquique (loan)	20	(0)
2021	→ Universidad de Concepción (loan)	27	(0)
2022	Universidad de Concepción	31	(1)
2023	Deportes La Serena	18	(0)
2024–2025	Deportes Concepción	35	(1)
2026	Deportes Recoleta	4	(0)
2026–	Cobreloa	0	(0)
- * Club domestic league appearances and goals as of 1 July 2026

Felipe Ignacio Saavedra Saavedra (born 26 September 1996) is a Chilean professional footballer who plays as a left-back for Cobreloa.

== Career ==
In 2024, Saavedra joined Deportes Concepción in the Segunda División Profesional de Chile. He left them at the end of 2025.

On 4 February 2026, Saavedra was announced as a signing for Provincial Ovalle, but he finally signed with Deportes Recoleta two days later. He switched to Cobreloa for the second half of the year.

== Honours ==
Deportes Concepción

- Segunda División Profesional: 2024

Cobreloa

- Primera B de Chile: 2026
