= Félix Cortés =

Chilean footballer (born 1989)

Personal information
- Full name: Félix Gonzalo Cortés Jiménez
- Date of birth: 15 March 1989 (age 37)
- Place of birth: La Serena, Chile
- Height: 1.80 m (5 ft 11 in)
- Position: Right back

Youth career
- Deportes La Serena

Senior career*
Years	Team	Apps	(Gls)
2009–2012	Deportes La Serena	53	(0)
2013–2014	Naval	29	(0)
2014–2015	Unión San Felipe	22	(2)
2015	Deportes La Serena	11	(1)
2016–2018	Unión San Felipe	48	(2)
Total		163	(5)
- * Club domestic league appearances and goals

Félix Gonzalo Cortés Jiménez (born 15 March 1989) is a Chilean former football player who played as a defender.

== Personal life ==
He is the younger brother of the former professional footballer Pedro Cortés, who played for both Deportes La Serena and Coquimbo Unido, classic rivals to each other.
