= Luis Valenzuela =

Chilean footballer (born 1988)

Personal information
- Full name: Luis Gabriel Valenzuela Toledo
- Date of birth: 22 February 1988 (age 38)
- Place of birth: Puente Alto, Santiago, Chile
- Height: 1.76 m (5 ft 9 in)
- Position: Midfielder

Team information
- Current team: Santiago Morning
- Number: 10

Youth career
- 2001–2005: Colo-Colo

Senior career*
Years	Team	Apps	(Gls)
2006–2008	Colo-Colo	3	(0)
2007	→ Deportivo Temuco (loan)	20	(3)
2008	→ Santiago Morning (loan)	2	(0)
2009	Deportes Temuco	4	(0)
2010	Curicó Unido	29	(6)
2011–2012	Unión San Felipe	22	(0)
2012	Unión San Felipe B	6	(5)
2012–2014	Deportes Antofagasta	44	(12)
2014–2015	O'Higgins	30	(5)
2015	Cobresal	12	(2)
2016	Deportes Melipilla	14	(7)
2017	Santiago Wanderers	14	(3)
2017–2018	Deportes Antofagasta	10	(2)
2018–2019	Santiago Wanderers	28	(3)
2019–2021	Ñublense	37	(2)
2022	Deportes Melipilla	5	(0)
2024	Santiago City	–	(–)
2025	Deportes Rengo	16	(0)
2026–	Santiago Morning	0	(0)
- * Club domestic league appearances and goals as of 25 January 2026

Luis Gabriel Valenzuela Toledo (Note: In this Spanish name, the first or paternal surname is Valenzuela and the second or maternal family name is Toledo.) (born 22 February 1988) is a Chilean footballer who plays as a midfielder for Santiago Morning.

== Career ==
He began his career as a youth player as a U-12 in Colo-Colo, the most successful team in Chile, then he was promoted to the adult team in 2006, aged 18, where he made his debut in August 2006 and at the end of the season, won Clausura 2006 Chilean Championship along with his team members Alexis and Humberto Suazo. Also ended up as the runner-up in Copa Sudamericana 2006 under the lead management of Claudio Borghi. He stayed in Colo-Colo until 2007. Then he joined Santiago Morning in 2008. After the contract ended, he signed with Deportes Temuco in 2009. In 2010, he played with Curicó Unido a team from the Chilean Primera División B. Beginning the season 2010/2011, he had agreed upon a contract with Unión San Felipe.

In August 2011, ArceSports (the footballer's agent) in association with Soccer Soccer Sport in Brazil, got a pre-contract between Luis Valenzuela and Ceará Sporting Club for a five-year period with this Campeonato Brasileiro Série A team.

In 2014, he signed with Chilean club O'Higgins.

In 2024, he signed with Santiago City in the Chilean Tercera A.

== Personal life ==
He is well known by his nickname Larry Valenzuela.

== Honours ==
Colo-Colo

- Primera División de Chile (1): 2006 Clausura
- Copa Sudamericana (1): Runner-up 2006
