= Marcelo Jorquera =

Chilean footballer (born 1992)

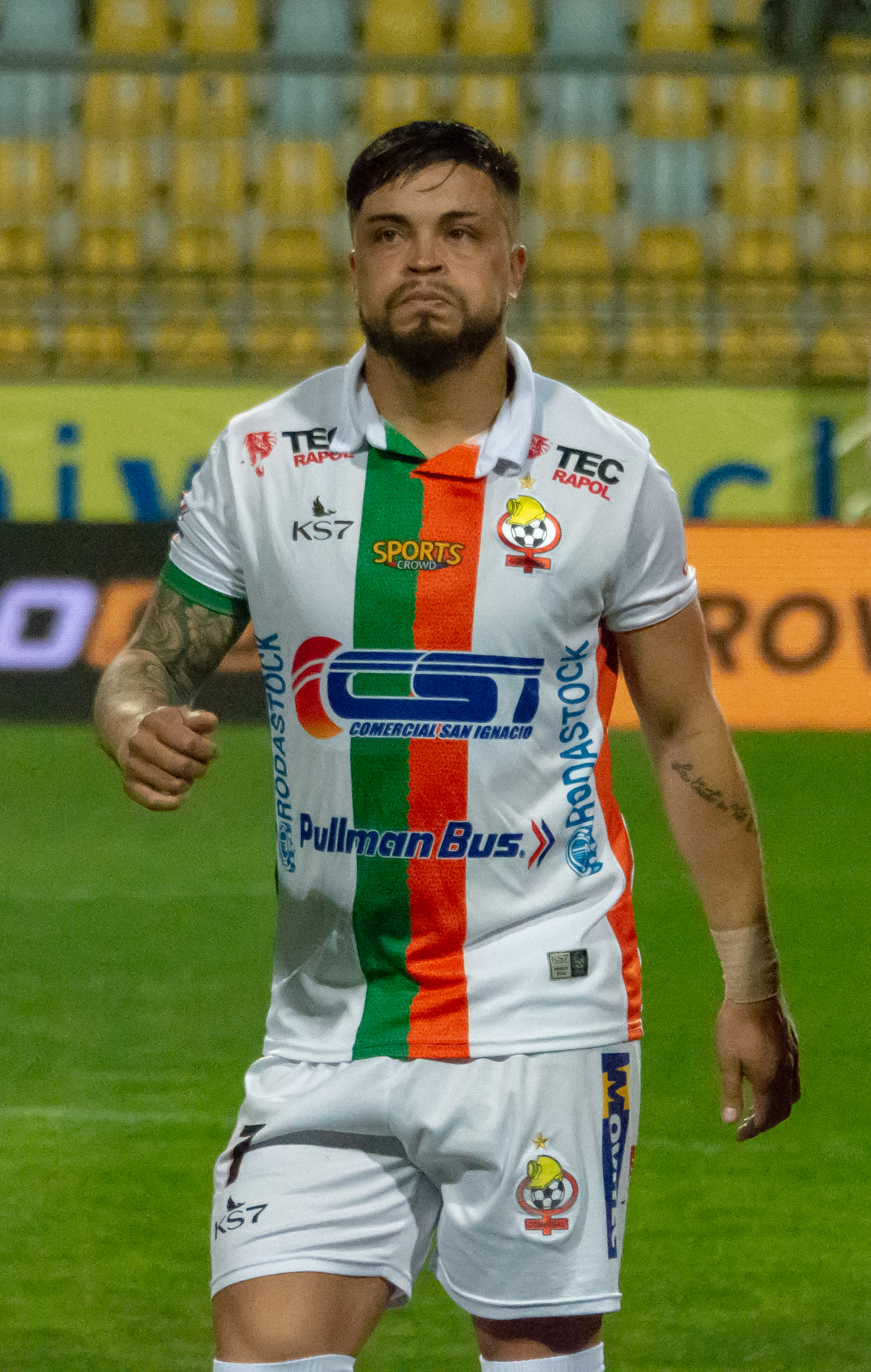
- Jorquera with Cobresal in 2023

Personal information
- Full name: Marcelo Pablo Jorquera Silva
- Date of birth: October 13, 1992 (age 34)
- Place of birth: Santiago, Chile
- Height: 1.73 m (5 ft 8 in)
- Position: Left back

Team information
- Current team: Santiago Morning
- Number: 16

Youth career
- Unión Española

Senior career*
Years	Team	Apps	(Gls)
2011	Provincial Osorno	–	(–)
2011–2013	Ñublense	40	(2)
2013–2017	Universidad de Chile	9	(0)
2014–2015	→ Deportes Iquique (loan)	15	(0)
2015–2016	→ Rangers (loan)	24	(0)
2016–2017	→ Barnechea (loan)	11	(0)
2017	Iberia	12	(1)
2018–2020	Cobresal	80	(2)
2021	Unión Española	19	(0)
2022–2024	Cobresal	79	(0)
2025	Deportes Iquique	16	(0)
2026–	Santiago Morning	0	(0)
- * Club domestic league appearances and goals as of 26 December 2025

Marcelo Pablo Jorquera Silva (born 13 October 1992) is a Chilean footballer who plays as a left-back for Santiago Morning.

== Career ==
A product of Unión Española, Jorquera started his career with Provincial Osorno at the Chilean Tercera A in 2011. In the second half of the same year, he moved to Ñublense. In 2013, he switched to Universidad de Chile.

Jorquera signed with Deportes Iquique for the 2025 season, his second stint with them after 2014–2015.

In March 2026, Jorquera joined Santiago Morning in the Segunda División Profesional de Chile.
