= Jason Flores =

Chilean footballer (born 1997)

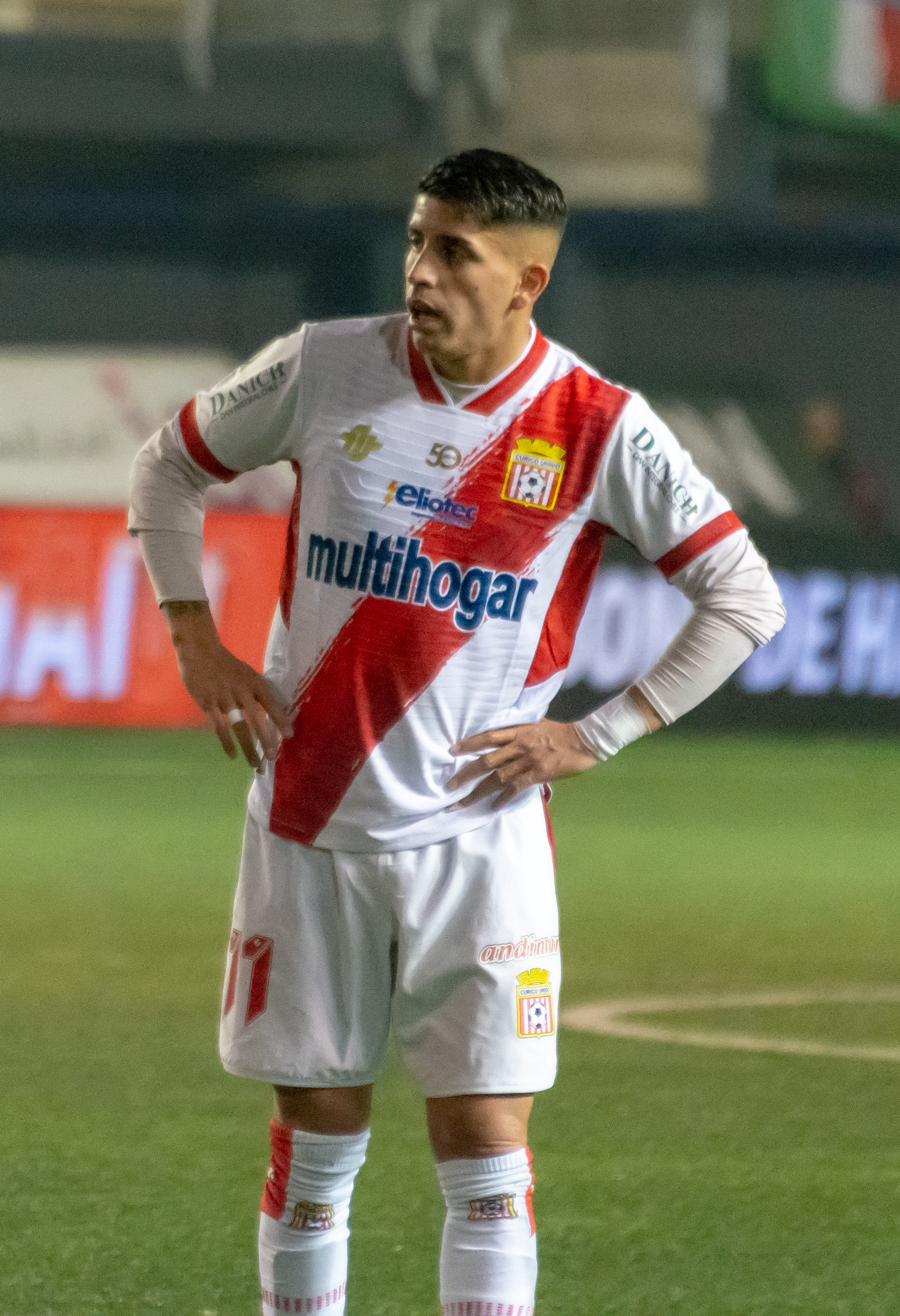
- Flores with Curicó Unido in 2023

Personal information
- Full name: Jason Paolo Flores Abrigo
- Date of birth: 28 February 1997 (age 29)
- Place of birth: Santiago, Chile
- Position: Midfielder

Team information
- Current team: Deportes Puerto Montt
- Number: 16

Youth career
- Unión Española

Senior career*
Years	Team	Apps	(Gls)
2014–2018	Unión Española	15	(2)
2017–2018	→ Deportes Antofagasta (loan)	26	(4)
2019–2024	Deportes Antofagasta	124	(16)
2023	→ Curicó Unido (loan)	1	(0)
2025	Coquimbo Unido	8	(0)
2025	Deportes Recoleta	12	(1)
2026–	Deportes Puerto Montt	0	(0)

International career
2015	Chile U20		
- * Club domestic league appearances and goals as of 31 December 2025

Jason Paolo Flores Abrigo (born 28 February 1997) is a Chilean footballer who plays as a midfielder for Deportes Puerto Montt.

== Club career ==
In January 2025, Flores signed with Coquimbo Unido from Deportes Antofagasta. He switched to Deportes Recoleta on 15 July of the same year. He was part of the Coquimbo Unido squad that won the 2025 Liga de Primera.

On 31 December 2025, Flores signed with Deportes Puerto Montt.

== International career ==
Along with Chile U20, he won the L'Alcúdia Tournament in 2015.

== Personal life ==
He is the cousin of the professional footballer Joe Abrigo.

== Honours ==
Coquimbo Unido

- Chilean Primera División: 2025

Chile U20

- L'Alcúdia International Tournament (1): 2015
