= Diego González (footballer, born 1986) =

Chilean footballer

Personal information
- Date of birth: 8 May 1986 (age 40)
- Place of birth: Quillota, Chile
- Height: 1.86 m (6 ft 1 in)
- Position: Forward

Senior career*
Years	Team	Apps	(Gls)
1999–2010	Unión La Calera	117	(21)
2007	→ Lota Schwager (loan)	10	(0)
2008	→ Cruz Azul Jasso (loan)	19	(2)
2011	Everton	23	(3)
2012	Deportes Temuco	3	(1)
2012	Deportivo Guaymallén	9	(4)
2013	Deportes Temuco	0	(0)
2013–2015	Independiente Rivadavia	37	(8)
2015	→ Atlético Tucumán (loan)	0	(0)
Total		218	(39)
- * Club domestic league appearances and goals

Diego Armando González Vega (born 8 May 1986) is a Chilean former professional footballer who played as a forward.

== Honours ==
Everton

- Primera B de Chile: 2011 Clausura
