= Joaquín Verdugo =

Chilean footballer (born 1996)

Personal information
- Full name: Joaquín Jaime Verdugo Salazar
- Date of birth: 7 October 1996 (age 30)
- Place of birth: Talca, Chile
- Height: 1.73 m (5 ft 8 in)
- Position: Midfielder

Team information
- Current team: Deportes Concepción
- Number: 10

Senior career*
Years	Team	Apps	(Gls)
2014–2017	Rangers	64	(8)
2017–2022	Huachipato	61	(0)
2022–	Deportes Concepción	6	(0)
- * Club domestic league appearances and goals as of 15 May 2022

Joaquín Jaime Verdugo Salazar (born 7 October 1996) is a Chilean footballer who plays as a midfielder for Deportes Concepción in the Segunda División Profesional de Chile.

== Statistical summary ==
Updated after the last match played on 2 October 2022.

Competition	Matches	Goals	Average	Assists	Average	G+A	Average
Chilean Primera División	60	0	0.00	0	0.00	0	0.00
Primera B de Chile	63	8	0.13	7	0.11	15	0.24
Segunda División de Chile	19	1	0.05	3	0.16	4	0.21
Copa Chile	23	2	0.09	4	0.17	6	0.26
Copa Sudamericana	3	0	0.00	0	0.00	0	0.00
Total	168	11	0.07	14	0.08	25	0.15
