= Nicolás Mancilla =

Chilean footballer (born 1993)

Personal information
- Full name: Nicolás Ramón Mancilla Hidalgo
- Date of birth: 7 October 1993 (age 33)
- Place of birth: Santiago, Chile
- Height: 1.79 m (5 ft 10 in)
- Position: Defender

Team information
- Current team: Deportes Puerto Montt

Youth career
- 2005: Universidad de Chile
- 2005–2013: Unión Española

Senior career*
| Years | Team | Apps | (Gls) |
| 2012–2022 | Unión Española | 72 | (1) |
| 2012–2013 | Unión Española B | 14 | (0) |
| 2014–2015 | → Iberia (loan) | 25 | (0) |
| 2018 | → Rangers (loan) | 11 | (0) |
| 2022–2023 | Ñublense | 4 | (0) |
| 2023 | → Rangers (loan) | 7 | (1) |
| 2024–2025 | Magallanes | 21 | (0) |
| 2026 | Real San Joaquín | 9 | (0) |
| 2026– | Deportes Puerto Montt | 0 | (0) |
- * Club domestic league appearances and goals as of 10 July 2026

Nicolás Ramón Mancilla Hidalgo (born 7 October 1993) is a Chilean footballer who plays as a defender for Deportes Puerto Montt.

== Career ==
In 2022, Mancilla signed with Ñublense from Unión Española. He ended his contract with them in December 2023.

In 2024, he joined Magallanes in the Primera B.

In July 2026, Mancilla signed with Deportes Puerto Montt from Real San Joaquín.
