= Diego Tadeo González =

Spanish poet

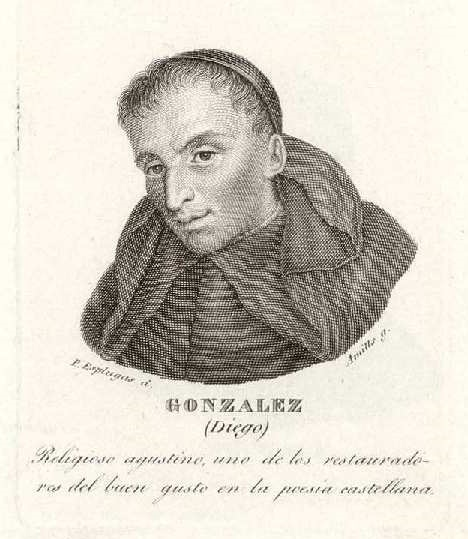
Diego Tadeo photo

Diego Tadeo González (1733–1794) was a Spanish poet who used the pen name Delio. He was a member of the Augustinian religious order.
