= Faloon Larraguibel =

Chilean actress

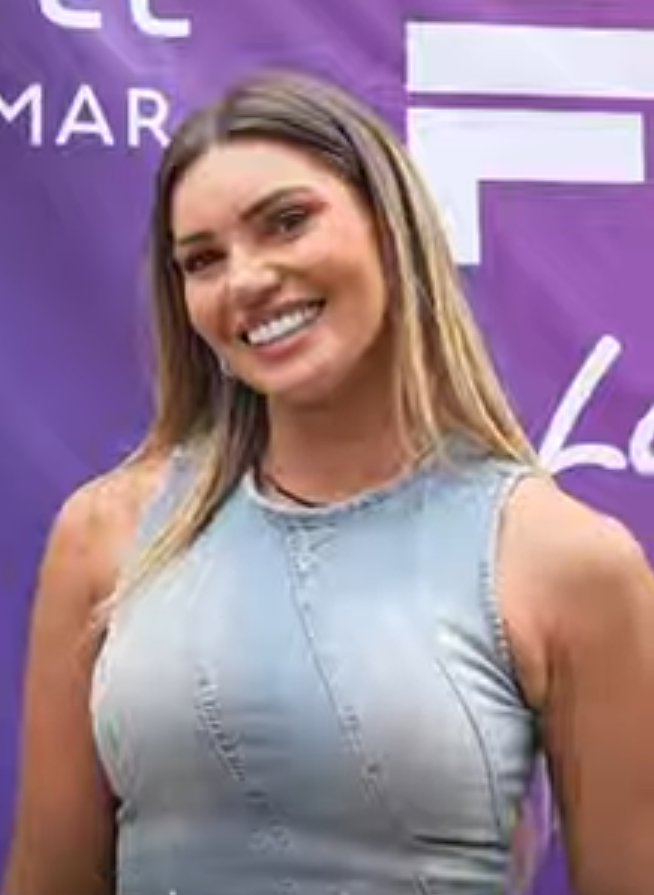
- Born: Faloon Denisse Larraguibel López; February 20, 1989 (age 37); Melipilla, Chile
- Spouse: Jean Paul Pineda (divorcio 2025)

Faloon Denisse Larraguibel López (born 20 February 1989 in Melipilla) is a Chilean , dancer and television presenter.

== Appearances ==
=== Programs ===
- 2003 : Mekano (Mega) : Participant
- 2009-2013 : Yingo (Chilevisión) : Participant
- 2010 : Fiebre de baile (Chilevisión) : Participant
- 2013 : Sin vergüenza (Chilevisión) : Presenter

=== Telenovelas ===
- 2010 : Don Diablo (Chilevisión) as Gina Plaza
- 2011 : Vampiras (Chilevisión) as Vania Piuchen (coprotagonist)
- 2012 : Gordis (Chilevisión) as Carrie SimSalabim

=== Reality shows ===
Year	Title	Notes	Rank
2009	Yingo: un auto está en juego	2nd eliminated	4th place
2009	Competencia por un departamento de Yingo	13th eliminated	¿? place
2010	Fiebre de Baile: Especial II	4th finalist	4th place
2013	¡Baila! Al ritmo de un sueño	Winner	1st place
2022	Aquí se baila	8th eliminated	8th place
2024	¿Ganar o servir? De vuelta al pasado	Semifinalist	3rd place
2024–2025	Palabra de honor	Runner-up	2nd place
2025–2026	Fiebre de baile VI	4th finalist	4th place
2026	Fiebre de baile VII	Walked	17th place
2026	¿Volverías con tu ex?	TBA	TBA
