= Richard Paredes =

Chilean footballer (born 1997)

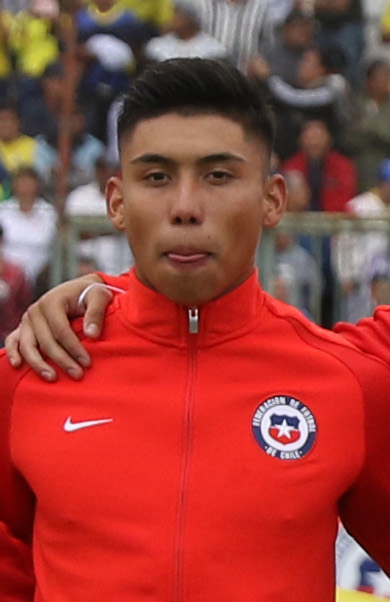
- Paredes with Chile U20 at the 2017 South American Championship

Personal information
- Full name: Richard Nicolás Paredes Moraga
- Date of birth: 4 December 1997 (age 28)
- Place of birth: Puente Alto, Santiago, Chile
- Height: 1.75 m (5 ft 9 in)
- Position: Forward

Team information
- Current team: Deportes Puerto Montt
- Number: 8

Youth career
- 2014–2015: Palestino

Senior career*
| Years | Team | Apps | (Gls) |
| 2015–2021 | Palestino | 30 | (4) |
| 2018 | → Deportes Recoleta (loan) | 15 | (4) |
| 2019–2021 | → Deportes La Serena (loan) | 35 | (7) |
| 2021–2023 | Deportes La Serena | 56 | (9) |
| 2024 | Santiago Morning | 15 | (6) |
| 2025 | Deportes Antofagasta | 21 | (5) |
| 2026– | Deportes Puerto Montt | 0 | (0) |

International career^{‡}
| 2015–2017 | Chile U20 | 3 | (0) |
- * Club domestic league appearances and goals as of 21 February 2024 ‡ National team caps and goals as of 26 January 2017

Richard Nicolás Paredes Moraga (born 4 December 1997) is a Chilean professional footballer who plays as a forward for Deportes Puerto Montt.

== Club career ==
After attending to a massive test, Paredes came to Palestino Youth Team on 2014, making his professional debut on 25 April 2015, in a Chilean Primera División match against Unión Española. Playing for Palestino, he made appearances in both Copa Sudamericana and Copa Libertadores. On 2018, he was loaned to Chilean Segunda División side Deportes Recoleta and to Deportes La Serena in the Primera B on 2019. Along with La Serena, he got the promotion to the 2020 Chilean Primera División.

After ending his loan from Palestino, in April 2021 he renewed his contract with Deportes La Serena on a deal for three seasons.

In 2024, he switched to Santiago Morning.

In 2026, Paredes joined Deportes Puerto Montt.

== International career ==
Along with Chile U20, he won the L'Alcúdia Tournament in 2015.

He represented Chile U20 at the 2017 South American U-20 Championship, making three appearances.

== Honours ==
Chile U20

- L'Alcúdia International Tournament (1): 2015
