= Emmanuel Pío =

Argentine footballer

Personal information
- Full name: Ariel Emmanuel Pío
- Date of birth: November 4, 1988 (age 37)
- Place of birth: Baradero, Argentina
- Height: 1.80 m (5 ft 11 in)
- Positions: Centre midfielder; right winger

Senior career*
Years	Team	Apps	(Gls)
2008–2011	Banfield	64	(0)
2011–2014	Tigre	28	(2)
2014–2015	Deportivo Morón	11	(0)
2015	Sportivo Baradero	9	(0)
2016	Defensores Unidos	13	(0)
2016	Sportivo Baradero	8	(0)
2017	Belgrano Zárate	–	(–)
2017–2019	Unión San Felipe	48	(5)
2019–2020	Juventud UU	17	(1)
2020–2021	Fénix	34	(2)
2022	Sarmiento Resistencia	26	(0)
2023	Santiago Morning	19	(0)
- * Club domestic league appearances and goals as of 28 December 2023

Ariel Emmanuel Pío (born 4 November 1988 in Baradero), known as Emmanuel Pío, is an Argentine football midfielder.

== Career ==
Pío made his first team debut for Banfield in a 3–2 win over Argentinos Juniors on 29 March 2008, he has since established himself as a regular player in the Banfield team.

In 2009, he was member of the squad that won the Apertura 2009 championship appearing in 6 games. On 13 December 2009 he celebrated with his teammates when Banfield won the Argentine championship for the first time in the history of the club.

== Honours ==
Banfield

- Primera División Argentina: Apertura 2009
