= Diego González (footballer, born November 1995) =

Chilean footballer

Personal information
- Full name: Diego Ignacio González Fuentes
- Date of birth: November 24, 1995 (age 30)
- Place of birth: Valparaíso, Chile
- Height: 1.66 m (5 ft 5 1/2 in)
- Positions: Midfielder; full back

Youth career
- Naval

Senior career*
Years	Team	Apps	(Gls)
2013–2014	Naval	27	(0)
2014	→ Universidad de Chile (loan)	0	(0)
2015–2017	Universidad de Chile	6	(0)
2016–2017	→ Iberia (loan)	21	(0)
2018	Iberia	21	(3)
2019	Deportes Santa Cruz	8	(0)
2020–2021	Deportes Concepción	11	(0)
2021	Independiente Cauquenes	17	(0)
Total		111	(3)
- * Club domestic league appearances and goals

Diego Ignacio González Fuentes (born 24 November 1995 in Valparaíso, Chile) is a Chilean former footballer who played as a midfielder.

== Career ==
González made his professional with Naval. He after joined Chilean giant Universidad de Chile and made his debut with them under Martín Lasarte in 2015.

At international level, González was in the Chile preliminary squad for the 2013 South American U20 Championship under Mario Salas.

His last club at professional level was Independiente de Cauquenes in 2021 before playing for the amateur club Diego Portales from Concepción. After trialed with Naval in 2025, he announced his official retirement in August 2025.

== Career statistics ==
=== Club ===
Club	Season	League		Continental		Cup		Total	
Club	Season	Apps	Goals	Apps	Goals	Apps	Goals	Apps	Goals
Deportes Naval	2013–14	27	0	0	0	2	0	29	0
Deportes Naval	Total	27	0	0	0	2	0	29	0
Universidad de Chile	2014–15	0	0	0	0	0	0	0	0
Universidad de Chile	2015–16	6	0	0	0	7	1	13	1
Universidad de Chile	Total	6	0	0	0	7	1	13	1
Career total		33	0	0	0	9	1	42	1
