= Mario Pardo (footballer) =

Chilean footballer (born 1988)

Personal information
- Full name: Mario Esteban Pardo Acuña
- Date of birth: 13 May 1988 (age 38)
- Place of birth: La Serena, Chile
- Height: 1.80 m (5 ft 11 in)
- Position: Defender

Youth career
- Deportes La Serena

Senior career*
Years	Team	Apps	(Gls)
2005–2014	Deportes La Serena	122	(3)
2013	→ Union La Calera (loan)	9	(0)
2014–2015	Barnechea	19	(0)
2015–2016	Deportes Temuco	17	(2)
2016–2017	San Antonio Unido	26	(1)
2017	Iberia	13	(2)
2018	Coquimbo Unido	22	(2)
2019	Deportes Melipilla	11	(1)
2020–2021	Cobresal	32	(4)
2022	Deportes Iquique	9	(0)
2023	Deportes Linares	0	(0)
Total		280	(15)
- * Club domestic league appearances and goals

Mario Esteban Pardo Acuña (born 13 May 1988) is a Chilean former footballer who played as a defender.

== Career ==
His last club was Deportes Linares in 2023.

He won the Primera B de Chile with Deportes Temuco in 2015–16 and Coquimbo Unido in 2018.

== Personal life ==
Following his retirement, Pardo began to work in an auto repair shop and the mining industry.

== Honours ==
Deportes Temuco

- Primera B de Chile: 2015–16

Coquimbo Unido

- Primera B de Chile: 2018
