= Deportes Puerto Montt =

Chilean football club, based in Puerto Montt

- Full name: Club de Deportes Puerto Montt
- Nicknames: Delfines (Dolphins); Puerto Puerto; Albiverdes (The White and Greens)
- Founded: May 6, 1983; 43 years ago
- Ground: Regional de Chinquihue; Puerto Montt, Chile
- Capacity: 10,000
- Chairman: Héctor Gaete
- Coach: Emilio Mancilla
- League: Segunda División
- 2025: 1st (promoted)
- Website: www.dpmchile.cl
Home colours	Away colours

Club Deportes Puerto Montt is a Chilean football club based in the city of Puerto Montt, Los Lagos Region. The club was founded on May 6, 1983, and currently plays in the Second Division of the country (called Second Division but actually third after Chilean Primera Division and Primera B de Chile).

Their home games are played at the Estadio Regional de Chinquihue, located in Puerto Montt in front of the Tenglo Island, which has a capacity of 10,000 seats and hosted the 2015 FIFA U-17 World Cup. The stadium is known as one of the most austral stadiums in the world and for the Tenglo Canal view from every point of the place.

The club emblem is a dolphin standing between the city flag and a football. The club has a long-standing rivalry with regional neighbours Provincial Osorno and with Deportes Valdivia, as well as with clubs from Santiago.

== History ==
=== Early years: 1983–2001 ===
Deportes Puerto Montt was founded on 6 May 1983, following an initiative to incorporate clubs from southern Chile into the professional Second Division. The project received support from the local authorities and sporting community, and on 11 May the name Club de Deportes Puerto Montt was chosen from several proposals. The club made its professional debut on 21 August 1983, defeating Deportes Concepción 2–1 at the Estadio Collao, under manager Sergio Navarro.

Puerto Montt spent its first decade competing in the second tier, occasionally challenging for promotion before achieving its breakthrough in 1996. A 3–1 away victory over Ñublense on 16 November secured second place in the Primera B and promotion to the Primera División for the first time in the club's history. The club consolidated its position in the top flight and achieved its best campaign of the period in 1998, finishing seventh and narrowly missing qualification for the Copa Libertadores playoffs.

The initial spell in Primera División ended in 2001 amid financial difficulties and an unsuccessful campaign. Despite assembling a squad that included Nelson Tapia, Esteban Valencia and several other established players, Puerto Montt was relegated to Primera B.

=== 21st Century ===
Puerto Montt returned immediately to the top flight in 2002, winning the Primera B championship and securing the first national title in the club's history. The club remained in Primera División for the following five seasons. After narrowly preserving its top-flight status through the promotion playoffs in 2005, Puerto Montt produced one of its strongest Primera División campaigns in the 2006 Clausura, finishing third in the regular phase, winning Group C and reaching the championship playoffs, where it was eliminated by eventual champions Colo-Colo.

The club was relegated to Primera B in 2007 and was unable to secure an immediate return, losing a promotion playoff against Unión Española the following year. Puerto Montt nevertheless remained competitive in the second tier and reached the semi-finals of the Copa Chile in 2010, defeating Universidad Católica and Unión Española before losing to eventual champions Municipal Iquique.

A prolonged decline culminated in 2012, when Puerto Montt finished bottom of the Primera B aggregate table and was relegated to the Segunda División Profesional, the third tier of Chilean football. After a transitional first season, the club challenged for promotion in 2013–14 but ultimately finished third, two points behind champions Iberia.

Puerto Montt recovered its place in Primera B by winning the 2014–15 Segunda División Profesional (third tier), securing the championship and promotion with a 4–0 victory over San Antonio Unido at the Estadio Chinquihue. In its first season back, the club came close to achieving consecutive promotions, reaching the 2015–16 promotion final before losing 3–2 on aggregate to Everton.

Puerto Montt remained in Primera B over the following years and again challenged for promotion in 2022. After eliminating Rangers and Unión San Felipe, the club defeated Deportes Copiapó 3–0 in the first leg of the promotion semi-final, but suffered a 4–0 defeat in the return match and was eliminated 4–3 on aggregate.

The club's nine-season spell in Primera B ended in 2023. Despite defeating Unión San Felipe on the final matchday, Puerto Montt finished bottom on goal difference and was relegated to the Segunda División Profesional. After two seasons in the third tier, the club won the 2025 Segunda División Profesional de Chile, securing the title with a home victory over regional rivals Provincial Osorno and earning promotion to the Liga de Ascenso for the 2026 season.

== Stadium ==
Estadio Regional de Chinquihue is a multi-use stadium in Puerto Montt, Chile. It is currently used mostly for football matches and is the home stadium of Deportes Puerto Montt. The stadium was built in 1982, with an original capacity of 11,300.

In 2011 and 2013 it was completely renovated, and currently holds 10,000 people. The stadium hosted seven matches of the 2015 FIFA U-17 World Cup.

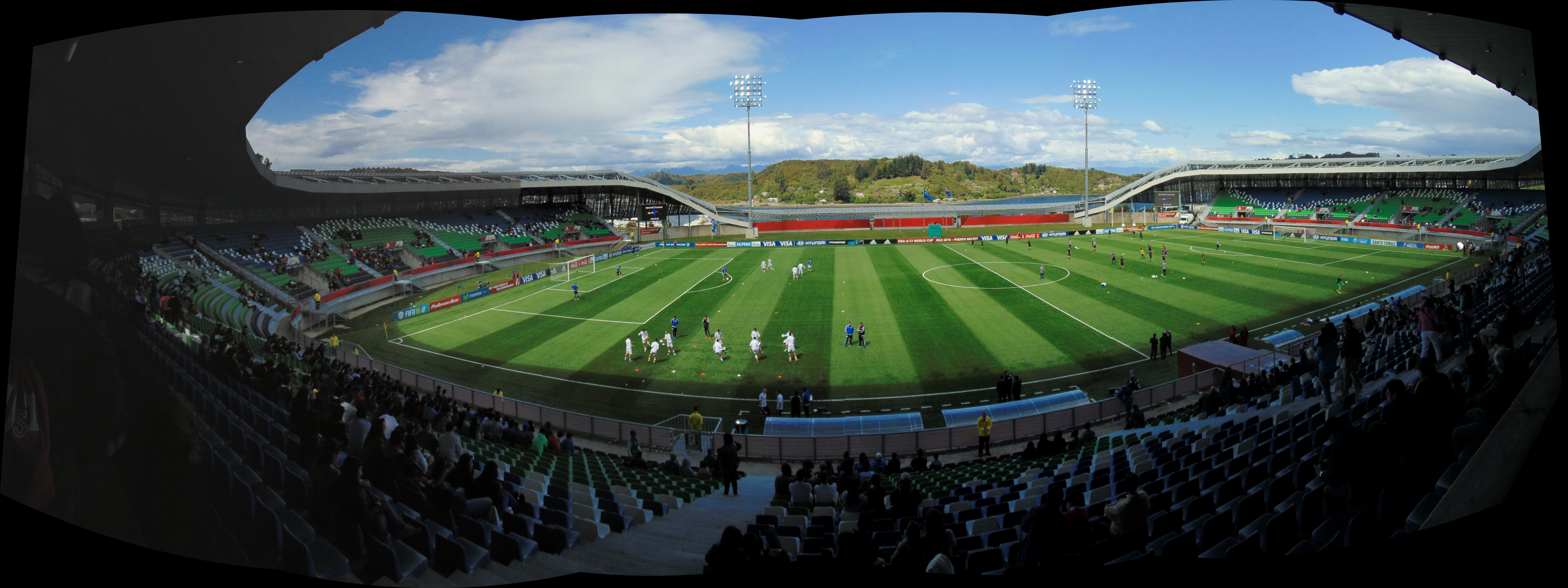
A panorama of the Regional Stadium of Chinquihue

== Players ==
=== Current squad ===
Current squad of Deportes Puerto Montt as of 14 July 2026 (edit)
Sources: ANFP Official Web Site

No.		Position	Player
1	CHI	GK	Manuel Escobar
2	ARG	DF	Ariel Morales
3	CHI	DF	Jesús Pino
4	CHI	DF	Maximiliano Riveros
5	CHI	DF	Francisco Calisto
6	CHI	MF	Danilo Díaz
8	CHI	FW	Richard Paredes
9	ARG	FW	Luciano Vázquez (c)
10	CHI	MF	Cristóbal Vargas
11	VEN	FW	Reiner Castro
12	CHI	GK	Axel Mancilla
13	CHI	GK	Luis Ureta
14	CHI	MF	José Cárdenas
15	CHI	DF	Kevin Egaña
16	CHI	MF	Jason Flores
17	CHI	DF	Byron Nieto
18	ARG	MF	Alexis Sabella
19	CHI	FW	Bryan Taiva
20	CHI	DF	Daniel Bahamonde

No.		Position	Player
21	CHI	MF	Fabián Espinoza
22	ARG	MF	Juan Jaime
23	CHI	MF	Gabriel Castillo
24	CHI	FW	Juan González
25	CHI	DF	Clemente Leiva
26	CHI	DF	Nicolás Mancilla
27	CHI	DF	Diego Mancilla
28	CHI	FW	Sebastián Pérez
29	CHI	GK	Gonzalo Collao
30	CHI	FW	Salvador Negrete (loan from Universidad de Chile)
31	CHI	FW	Cristóbal Nannig
32	CHI	DF	Clemente Parra
34	CHI	FW	Kevin González
35	CHI	DF	Luis Rojas
36	CHI	GK	Emilio Ascui
37	CHI	MF	Pablo Cachi
38	CHI	DF	Yedar Naguil
39	CHI	DF	Gabriel Vega

Manager: Emilio Mancilla

== Managers ==
- (Chile) Sergio Navarro (1983-1984)
- (Chile) Hernán Godoy (1984)
- (Chile) Héctor Barría (1985)
- (Chile) Alicel Belmar (1985-1986)
- (Chile) Jorge Socías (1986)
- (Chile) Manuel Rubilar (1987)
- (Chile) Sergio Mansilla (1987)
- (Chile) Manuel Rubilar (1988)
- (Chile) Arturo Quiroz (1988-1989)
- (Chile) Oscar Zambrano (1990-1991)
- (Chile) Francisco Valdés (1991)
- (Chile) Alfonso Sepúlveda (1992)
- (Chile) Francisco Valdés (1993)
- (Chile) José González (1993)
- (Chile) Ramón Climent (1993)
- (Chile) José González (1994)
- (Chile) Manuel Rubilar (1994)
- (Chile) Víctor Manuel González (1995)
- (Chile) Alfonso Sepúlveda (1995-1997)
- (Chile) Jorge Garcés (1997)
- (Paraguay) Alicio Solalinde (1998-1999)
- (Chile) Vladimir Bigorra (2000-2001)
- (Chile) Fernando Díaz (2001)
- (Paraguay) Sergio Nichiporuk (2001-2002)
- (Chile) Gino Valentini (2003-2004)
- (Argentina) Fernando Cavalleri (2005-2007)
- (Uruguay) Jorge Luis Siviero (2007)
- (Chile) Jaime Vera (2008-2010)
- (Chile) Jorge Contreras (2011)
- (Chile) Alejandro Hisis (2011-2012)
- (Chile) Gino Valentini (2012)
- (Chile) Nelson Mores (2013)
- (Chile) Gino Valentini (2013)
- (Chile) Gerardo Silva (2013-2014)
- (Chile) Erwin Durán (2014-2017)
- (Chile) Óscar Correa (2017)
- (Chile) Luis Landeros (2018)
- (Chile) Fernando Vergara (2018-2019)
- (Chile) Jorge Aravena (2020-2021)
- (Chile) Felipe Cornejo (2021)
- (Chile) Erwin Durán (2022-2023)
- (Chile) Felipe Cornejo (2023)
- (Chile) Jaime Vera (2024-2025)
- (Chile) Emiliano Astorga (2026)
- (Chile) Emilio Mancilla (2026-)

== Honours ==
=== Domestic ===
- Primera B: 1

2002

- Segunda División: 2

2014–15, 2025

=== Women's team ===
- Primera B: 1

2019
